= Canada at the 2011 World Championships in Athletics =

- WA code: CAN
- National federation: Athletics Canada
- Website: www.athletics.ca

in Daegu
- Competitors: 28
- Medals: Gold 0 Silver 1 Bronze 0 Total 1

World Championships in Athletics appearances (overview)
- 1976; 1980; 1983; 1987; 1991; 1993; 1995; 1997; 1999; 2001; 2003; 2005; 2007; 2009; 2011; 2013; 2015; 2017; 2019; 2022; 2023; 2025

Canada competed at the 2011 World Championships in Athletics from August 27 to September 4 in Daegu, South Korea.

== Team selection ==
A team of 32 athletes was announced in preparation for the competition. Selected athletes have achieved one of the competition's qualifying standards. The team also includes two athletes who will compete in the exhibition events, Erik Gauthier T53 400m for men and Diane Roy T54 800m for women.

There are a few notable absences on this year's team, including Priscilla Lopes-Schliep, a former Olympic medalist and Canadian record holder in the 100 meter hurdles who is sitting out the season to give birth to her first child. Other notable absences include 2010 Commonwealth Games gold medalists Alice Falaiye, Sultana Frizell and Nicole Forrester.

The following athletes appeared on the preliminary Entry List, but not on the Official Start List of the specific event, resulting in total number of 28 competitors:

KEY:	Did not participate	Competed in another event

	Event	Athlete
Men	4 x 100 metres relay	Bryan Barnett
Men	4 x 100 metres relay	Oluseyi Smith
Women	400 metres	Jenna Martin
Women	100 metres hurdles	Angela Whyte
Women	4 x 400 metres relay	Amonn Nelson
Women	4 x 400 metres relay	Kimberly Hyacinthe
Women	Hammer throw	Sultana Frizell

== Medallists ==
The following Canadian competitor won a medal at the Championships

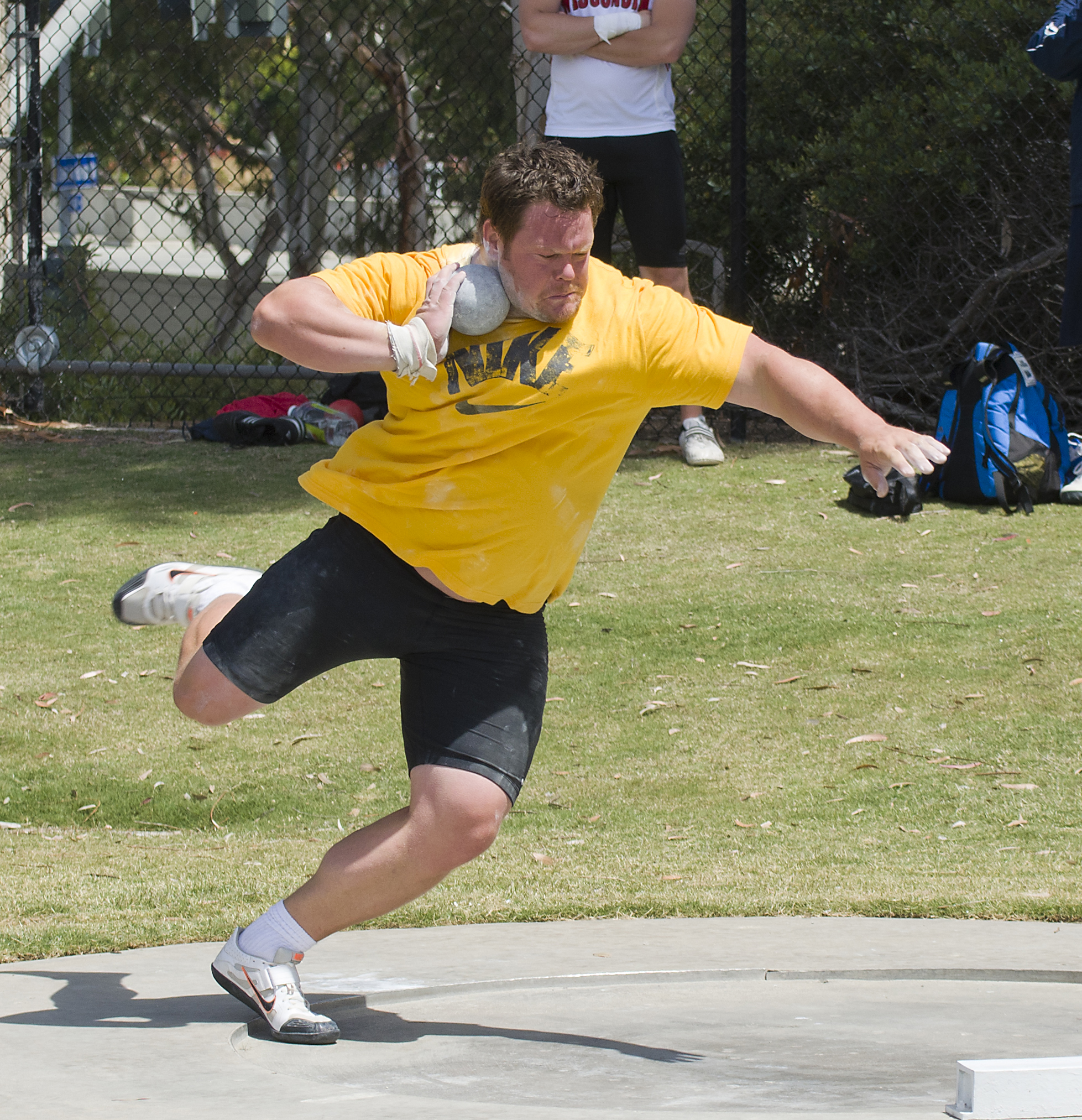
Dylan Armstrong won a silver medal in the Men's Shot Put event at this year's championships (foto archived from earlier 2011)

Medal	Athlete	Event
Silver	Dylan Armstrong	Shot put

== Results ==
=== Men ===
Athlete	Event	Preliminaries		Heats		Semifinals		Final	
Athlete	Event	Time	Rank	Time	Rank	Time	Rank	Time	Rank
Sam Effah	100 metres	did not start							
Justyn Warner	100 metres			10.33	16 Q	10.47	21	did not advance	
Bryan Barnett	200 metres			20.75	18	Did not advance			
Jared Connaughton	200 metres			20.83	25	Did not advance			
Andrew Ellerton	800 metres			1:47.47	24	did not advance			
Geoffrey Martinson	1500 metres			3:40.98	17 q	3:48.83	22	Did not advance	
Sam Effah; Gavin Smellie; Jared Connaughton; Justyn Warner	4 x 100 metres relay			39.28	18			Did not advance	
Alex Genest	3000 metres steeplechase			8:36.67	26			did not advance	
Matthew Hughes	3000 metres steeplechase			8:58.52	34			did not advance	
Dylan Armstrong	Shot put	21.05	2 Q					21.64	2nd place, silver medalist(s)
Jim Steacy	Hammer throw	73.32	19					did not advance	
Scott Russell	Javelin throw	77.49	19					Did not advance	

Decathlon

Decathlon	Event	Jamie Adjetey-Nelson		
Decathlon	Event	Results	Points	Rank
	100 m	10.97	867	15
	Long jump	7.21	864	17
	Shot put	DNS	-	DNS
	High jump	DNS	-	DNS
	400 m	DNS	-	DNS
	110 m hurdles	DNS	-	DNS
	Discus throw	DNS	-	DNS
	Pole vault	DNS	-	DNS
	Javelin throw	DNS	-	DNS
	1500 m	DNS	-	DNS
Final			DNF	DNF

Decathlon	Event	Damian Warner		
Decathlon	Event	Results	Points	Rank
	100 m	10.56	961	3
	Long jump	7.35	898	10
	Shot put	13.26	683	24
	High jump	2.02	822	13
	400 m	50.12	809	18
	110 m hurdles	14.19	950	4
	Discus throw	41.71	699	21
	Pole vault	4.50	760	20
	Javelin throw	54.51	657	18
	1500 m	4:54.37	593	19
Final			7832	18

=== Women ===
Athlete	Event	Heats		Semifinals		Final	
Athlete	Event	Time	Rank	Time	Rank	Time	Rank
Kimberly Hyacinthe	200 metres	23.83	30	Did not advance			
Lemlem Bereket	800 metres	2:03.62	30	Did not advance			
Nikkita Holder	100 metres hurdles	12.90 PB	8 Q	12.84 PB	8 q	12.93	6
Phylicia George	100 metres hurdles	12.84	5 Q	12.73 PB	4 Q	17.97	7
Perdita Felicien	100 metres hurdles	12.95	10 Q	12.88	11	Did not advance	
Adrienne Power; Esther Akinsulie; Jenna Martin; Lemlem Bereket	4 x 400 metres relay	3:27.92 SB	13			Did not advance	
Rachel Seaman	20 kilometres walk					1:43:31	37
Kelsie Hendry	Pole vault	4.25	24			did not advance	
Julie Labonté	Shot put	18.04	18			did not advance	
Heather Steacy	Hammer throw	63.39	28			Did not advance	

Heptathlon

Heptathlon	Event	Ruky Abdulai		
Heptathlon	Event	Results	Points	Rank
	100 m hurdles	13.60 PB	1036	17
	High jump	1.80	978	12
	Shot put	11.72	643	25
	200 m	24.50	933	9
	Long jump	6.30	943	7
	Javelin throw	46.35	790	8
	800 m	2:15.29 PB	889	14
Final			6212 PB	13

Heptathlon	Event	Jessica Zelinka		
Heptathlon	Event	Results	Points	Rank
	100 m hurdles	13.01	1123	3
	High jump	1.68	830	26
	Shot put	14.91	855	4
	200 m	24.06	975	5
	Long jump	6.16 SB	899	13
	Javelin throw	39.59	659	22
	800 m	2:12.62	927	8
Final			6268	9
