= France at the 2011 World Championships in Athletics =

- WA code: FRA
- National federation: Fédération Française d'Athlétisme
- Website: www.athle.org

in Daegu
- Competitors: 39
- Medals: Gold 0 Silver 1 Bronze 3 Total 4

World Championships in Athletics appearances
- 1976; 1980; 1983; 1987; 1991; 1993; 1995; 1997; 1999; 2001; 2003; 2005; 2007; 2009; 2011; 2013; 2015; 2017; 2019; 2022; 2023; 2025

France competed at the 2011 World Championships in Athletics from August 27 to September 4 in Daegu, South Korea.

== Team selection ==
The French Athletics Federation (Fédération Française d'Athlétisme) announced the final team of 46 athletes to represent the country in the event, led by sprinter Christophe Lemaitre and pole vaulter Renaud Lavillenie.

The following athletes appeared on the preliminary Entry List, but not on the Official Start List of the specific event, resulting in total number of 39 competitors:

KEY:	Did not participate	Competed in another event

	Event	Athlete
Men	400 metres	Teddy Venel
Men	4 × 100 metres relay	Emmanuel Biron
Men	4 × 100 metres relay	Ronald Pognon
Men	4 × 100 metres relay	Pierre-Alexis Pessonneaux
Men	4 × 400 metres relay	Yannick Fonsat
Women	100 metres	Carima Louami
Women	200 metres	Lina Jacques-Sébastien
Women	400 metres	Muriel Hurtis-Houairi
Women	400 m hurdles	Phara Anacharsis
Women	4 × 100 metres relay	Ayodelé Ikuesan
Women	4 × 100 metres relay	Carima Louami
Women	4 × 400 metres relay	Elea-Mariama Diarra

== Medalists ==
The following competitors from France won medals at the Championships

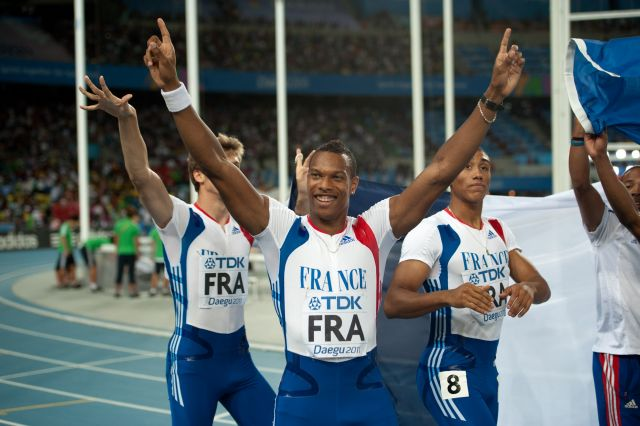
The French 4 × 100 m relay team won a silver medal at this year's championships (the foto shows Christophe Lemaître, Teddy Tinmar, and Jimmy Vicaut)

Medal	Athlete	Event
Silver	Teddy Tinmar; Christophe Lemaître; Yannick Lesourd; Jimmy Vicaut	4 × 100 metres relay
Bronze	Christophe Lemaître	200 metres
Bronze	Mahiedine Mekhissi-Benabbad	3000 metres steeplechase
Bronze	Renaud Lavillenie	Pole vault

== Results ==
=== Men ===
Athlete	Event	Preliminaries		Heats		Semifinals		Final	
Athlete	Event	Time Width Height	Rank	Time Width Height	Rank	Time Width Height	Rank	Time Width Height	Rank
Christophe Lemaître	100 metres			10.14	4 Q	10.11	6 Q	10.19	4
Jimmy Vicaut	100 metres			10.25	5 Q	10.10	5 q	10.27	6
Christophe Lemaître	200 metres			20.51	6 Q	20.17 SB	1 Q	19.80 NR	3rd place, bronze medalist(s)
Mehdi Baala	1500 metres			4:13.10	36 q	3:46.87	16 Q	3:37.46	9
Yoann Kowal	1500 metres			3:39.33	3 Q	3:37.44	8	Did not advance	
Florian Carvalho	1500 metres			3:53.88	34	Did not advance			
Dimitri Bascou	110 m hurdles			13.51	10 q	13.62	10	Did not advance	
Mahiedine Mekhissi-Benabbad	3000 metres steeplechase			8:23.71	12 Q			8:16.09	3rd place, bronze medalist(s)
Bouabdellah Tahri	3000 metres steeplechase			8:13.22	5 q			8:17.56	4
Vincent Zouaoui Dandrieux	3000 metres steeplechase			8:23.79	14 q			8:30.39	12
Teddy Tinmar; Christophe Lemaître; Yannick Lesourd; Jimmy Vicaut	4 × 100 metres relay			38.38 SB	6 Q			38.20 SB	2nd place, silver medalist(s)
Nicolas Fillon; Teddy Venel; Mamoudou-Elimane Hanne; Yoann Décimus	4 × 400 metres relay			3:03.68	14			Did not advance	
Bertrand Moulinet	50 kilometres walk							4:07:58	23
Cédric Houssaye	50 kilometres walk							DSQ	
Yohann Diniz	50 kilometres walk							DSQ	
Salim Sdiri	Long jump	7.58	28					Did not advance	
Benjamin Compaoré	Triple jump	17.11	7					17.17	8
Renaud Lavillenie	Pole vault	5.65	1 q					5.85	3rd place, bronze medalist(s)
Romain Mesnil	Pole vault	5.65	1 q					NM	
Jérôme Clavier	Pole vault	5.50	18					Did not advance	

Decathlon

Romain Barras	Decathlon			
Romain Barras	Event	Results	Points	Rank
	100 m	11.20	817	23
	Long jump	7.06	828	21
	Shot put	14.92	785	11
	High jump	1.99 SB	794	16
	400 m	49.50	838	14
	110 m hurdles	14.37	927	8
	Discus throw	41.65	698	22
	Pole vault	5.00 SB	910	5
	Javelin throw	63.25	787	9
	1500 m	4:29.19	750	7
Total			8134 SB	11

=== Women ===
Athlete	Event	Preliminaries		Heats		Semifinals		Final	
Athlete	Event	Time Width Height	Rank	Time Width Height	Rank	Time Width Height	Rank	Time Width Height	Rank
Véronique Mang	100 metres			11.19	9 Q	11.44	11	Did not advance	
Myriam Soumaré	100 metres			11.11 PB	3 Q	11.47	12	Did not advance	
Myriam Soumaré	200 metres			22.71 SB	6 Q	23.02	12	Did not advance	
Christelle Daunay	10,000 metres							32:22.20	12
Sandra Gomis	100 m hurdles			13.07	17 Q	13.55	23	Did not advance	
Cindy Billaud	100 m hurdles			13.50	33	Did not advance			
Myriam Soumaré; Céline Distel; Lina Jacques-Sébastien; Véronique Mang	4 × 100 metres relay			42.60 SB	4 Q			42.70	5
Phara Anacharsis; Muriel Hurtis-Houairi; Marie Gayot; Floria Gueï	4 × 400 metres relay			3:28.02 SB	14			Did not advance	
Eloyse Lesueur	Long jump	6.22	26					Did not advance	
Mélanie Melfort	High jump	1.92	15					Did not advance	
Stéphanie Falzon	Hammer throw	68.92	12 q					66.57	12

Heptathlon

Ida Antoinette Nana Djimou	Heptathlon			
Ida Antoinette Nana Djimou	Event	Results	Points	Rank
	100 m hurdles	13.48	1053	14
	High jump	1.83 SB	1016	6
	Shot put	14.07	799	14
	200 m	25.19	869	15
	Long jump	6.13	890	14
	Javelin throw	55.79 PB	973	1
	800 m	2:28.74	709	24
Total			6309	7
