= 2011 World Championships in Athletics – Women's hammer throw =

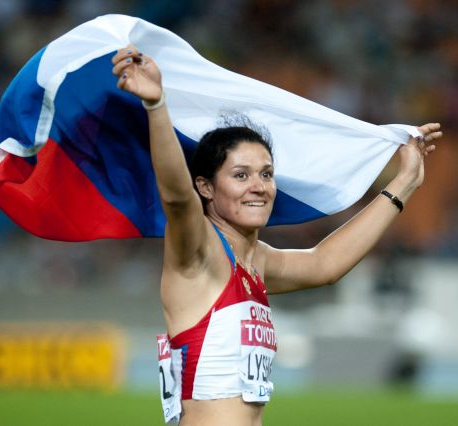
Tatyana Lysenko after her victory.

The women's hammer throw event at the 2011 World Championships in Athletics was held at the Daegu Stadium on September 2 and 4.

Betty Heidler was the pre-event favourite: she was undefeated that season, held the four best marks of the year, and had broken the world record with a throw of 79.42 m in May. Tatyana Lysenko, a former record holder, was ranked second prior to the championships. Yipsi Moreno and Zhang Wenxiu (both medalists at the 2008 Olympics) were both in good form that season, as was Kathrin Klaas (fourth in 2009). Zalina Marghieva, Alena Matoshka, Jennifer Dahlgren were other entrants ranked in the top ten. The 2009 world champion Anita Włodarczyk was not expected to compete due to a back injury.

Tatyana Lysenko won the competition on her first throw, then proceeded to improve her position on the next two throws. Top qualifier Zhang Wenxiu also made her best throw on her first attempt. It took Betty Heidler until the 5th round to finally displace her into bronze position, pushing Yipsi Moreno off the medal stand. Defending champion Anita Włodarczyk did make a game effort, throwing her season best, but only managed 5th place.

== Medalists ==
Gold	Silver	Bronze
Tatyana Lysenko; Russia	Betty Heidler; Germany	Zhang Wenxiu; China

== Records ==
World record	Betty Heidler (GER)	79.42	Halle, Germany	21 May 2011
Championship record	Anita Włodarczyk (POL)	77.96	Berlin, Germany	22 August 2009
World leading	Betty Heidler (GER)	79.42	Halle, Germany	21 May 2011
African record	Marwa Hussein (EGY)	68.48	Cairo, Egypt	18 February 2005
Asian record	Zhang Wenxiu (CHN)	75.65	Fränkisch-Crumbach, Germany	12 June 2011
North, Central American and Caribbean record	Yipsi Moreno (CUB)	76.62	Zagreb, Croatia	9 September 2008
South American record	Jennifer Dahlgren (ARG)	73.74	Buenos Aires, Argentina	10 April 2010
European record	Betty Heidler (GER)	79.42	Halle, Germany	21 May 2011
Oceanian record	Bronwyn Eagles (AUS)	71.12	Adelaide, Australia	6 February 2003

== Qualification standards ==
A mark	B mark
71.50 m	69.00

== Schedule ==
Date	Time	Round
2 September 2011	10:00	Qualification
4 September 2011	18:15	Final

== Results ==
=== Qualification ===
Qualification: Qualifying Performance 71.00 (Q) or at least 12 best performers (q) advance to the final.

Rank	Group	Athlete	Nationality	#1	#2	#3	Result	Notes
1	A	Zhang Wenxiu	China	74.17			74.17	Q
2	B	Yipsi Moreno	Cuba	73.29			73.29	Q
3	B	Jennifer Dahlgren	Argentina	67.81	x	72.70	72.70	Q, SB
4	A	Tatyana Lysenko	Russia	71.94			71.94	Q
5	A	Kathrin Klaas	Germany	69.26	69.57	71.69	71.69	Q
6	B	Betty Heidler	Germany	71.48			71.48	Q
7	B	Anita Włodarczyk	Poland	71.09			71.09	Q
8	A	Jessica Cosby	United States	71.06			71.06	Q
9	A	Zalina Marghieva	Moldova	x	70.09	69.85	70.09	q
10	A	Silvia Salis	Italy	69.82	66.58	x	69.82	q
11	A	Bianca Perie	Romania	68.12	69.66	69.01	69.66	q
12	A	Stéphanie Falzon	France	x	68.92	67.37	68.92	q
13	B	Éva Orbán	Hungary	68.89	68.28	x	68.89	
14	A	Amber Campbell	United States	68.26	68.87	x	68.87	
15	B	Jeneva McCall	United States	68.26	65.22	65.45	68.26	
16	B	Alena Matoshka	Belarus	x	68.23	67.88	68.23	
17	B	Marina Marghiev	Moldova	x	67.95	x	67.95	
18	B	Berta Castells	Spain	67.74	65.22	67.02	67.74	
19	B	Nataliya Zolotukhina	Ukraine	67.44	67.57	65.93	67.57	
20	B	Mona Holm	Norway	67.16	66.97	x	67.16	
21	A	Joanna Fiodorow	Poland	x	66.88	x	66.88	
22	A	Alexandra Papageorgiou	Greece	64.38	65.58	66.77	66.77	
23	A	Amy Sène	Senegal	66.15	x	61.31	66.15	
24	A	Merja Korpela	Finland	63.93	x	65.64	65.64	
25	A	Vânia Silva	Portugal	64.46	65.40	64.18	65.40	
26	B	Sophie Hitchon	Great Britain & N.I.	61.91	x	64.93	64.93	
27	B	Masumi Aya	Japan	60.14	64.09	x	64.09	
28	A	Heather Steacy	Canada	63.39	x	x	63.39	
29	B	Liu Tingting	China	61.45	62.17	63.12	63.12	
30	A	Kang Na-Ru	South Korea	61.05	x	x	61.05	

=== Final ===
Rank	Athlete	Nationality	#1	#2	#3	#4	#5	#6	Result	Notes
1st place, gold medalist(s)	Tatyana Lysenko	Russia	76.80	77.09	77.13	74.51	75.05	x	77.13	SB
2nd place, silver medalist(s)	Betty Heidler	Germany	x	73.96	74.70	x	76.06	x	76.06	
3rd place, bronze medalist(s)	Zhang Wenxiu	China	75.03	74.31	x	73.17	71.86	74.79	75.03	
4	Yipsi Moreno	Cuba	73.29	x	74.48	x	x	x	74.48	SB
5	Anita Włodarczyk	Poland	73.56	x	72.61	x	x	72.65	73.56	SB
6	Bianca Perie	Romania	67.73	70.40	67.75	70.24	70.91	72.04	72.04	SB
7	Kathrin Klaas	Germany	67.02	70.18	70.67	71.89	70.44	x	71.89	
-	~~Zalina Marghieva~~	~~Moldova~~	69.99	x	68.13	70.24	70.27	68.76	~~70.27~~	DQ
8	Silvia Salis	Italy	68.61	69.88	x				69.88	
9	Jennifer Dahlgren	Argentina	68.27	x	69.72				69.72	
10	Jessica Cosby	United States	x	68.91	68.15				68.91	
11	Stéphanie Falzon	France	66.57	x	x				66.57	
