= 2011 World Championships in Athletics – Men's hammer throw =

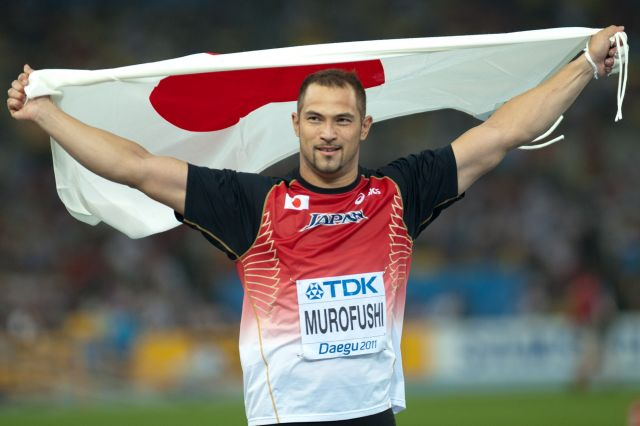
Koji Murofushi victory celebration at Daegu

Official Video

The Men's Hammer throw event at the 2011 World Championships in Athletics was held at the Daegu Stadium on August 27 & 29.

Koji Murofushi took the lead with his first throw, improving on each of his first three throws to 81.24. Primož Kozmus moved into second place with a second round 79.39 while Krisztián Pars made a minor improvement with every throw (except his failed fifth attempt), passing Kozmus on his fourth throw. Pars last throw was his best, but 81.18 was not quite enough to catch Murofushi.

== Medalists ==
Gold	Silver	Bronze
Koji Murofushi; Japan	Krisztián Pars; Hungary	Primož Kozmus; Slovenia

== Records ==
World record	Yuriy Sedykh (URS)	86.74	Stuttgart, West Germany	30 August 1986
Championship record	Ivan Tsikhan (BLR)	83.89	Helsinki, Finland	8 August 2005
World leading	Aleksey Zagornyi (RUS)	81.73	Yerino, Russia	4 June 2011
African record	Chris Harmse (RSA)	80.63	Durban, South Africa	15 April 2005
Asian record	Koji Murofushi (JPN)	84.86	Prague, Czech Republic	29 June 2003
North, Central American and Caribbean record	Lance Deal (USA)	82.52	Milan, Italy	7 September 1996
South American record	Juan Ignacio Cerra (ARG)	76.42	Trieste, Italy	25 July 2001
European record	Yuriy Sedykh (URS)	86.74	Stuttgart, West Germany	30 August 1986
Oceanian record	Stuart Rendell (AUS)	79.29	Varaždin, Croatia	6 July 2002

== Qualification standards ==
A standard	B standard
78.00 m	74.00

== Schedule ==
Date	Time	Round
August 27, 2011	20:30	Qualification
August 29, 2011	19:10	Final

== Results ==
=== Qualification ===
Qualification: Qualifying Performance 77.00 (Q) or at least 12 best performers (q) advance to the final.

Rank	Group	Athlete	Nationality	#1	#2	#3	Result	Notes
1	A	Koji Murofushi	Japan	78.56			78.56	Q, SB
2	B	Pavel Kryvitski	Belarus	x	76.80	78.16	78.16	Q
3	B	Markus Esser	Germany	77.60			77.60	Q
4	A	Krisztián Pars	Hungary	77.21			77.21	Q
5	A	Szymon Ziółkowski	Poland	x	77.19		77.19	Q
6	A	Dilshod Nazarov	Tajikistan	75.34	75.17	76.93	76.93	q
7	B	Yury Shayunou	Belarus	76.74	76.63	76.07	76.74	q
8	B	Nicola Vizzoni	Italy	75.41	76.30	76.74	76.74	q
9	A	Olli-Pekka Karjalainen	Finland	x	75.09	76.60	76.60	q, SB
10	B	Primož Kozmus	Slovenia	76.21	76.54	76.44	76.54	q
11	B	Paweł Fajdek	Poland	75.83	76.10	75.66	76.10	q
12	A	Kirill Ikonnikov	Russia	75.36	x	x	75.36	q
13	A	Ali Al-Zinkawi	Kuwait	75.35	x	x	75.35	
14	A	Kibwe Johnson	United States	75.06	x	x	75.06	
15	B	Sergej Litvinov	Russia	74.80	x	73.11	74.80	
16	B	Kristóf Németh	Hungary	73.36	74.09	73.87	74.09	
17	B	Aleksei Sokirskiy	Ukraine	x	x	73.81	73.81	
18	A	Eşref Apak	Turkey	73.38	71.99	x	73.38	
19	B	James Steacy	Canada	73.32	71.74	x	73.32	
20	A	Igors Sokolovs	Latvia	71.90	71.64	72.95	72.95	
21	A	Marcel Lomnický	Slovakia	72.68	71.44	72.16	72.68	
22	B	Libor Charfreitag	Slovakia	x	71.87	72.20	72.20	
23	A	Valeriy Sviatokha	Belarus	x	x	71.58	71.58	
24	A	Eivind Henriksen	Norway	68.24	71.27	70.02	71.27	
25	A	András Haklits	Croatia	x	70.93	x	70.93	
26	A	Dzmitry Marshin	Azerbaijan	70.04	68.94	68.99	70.04	
27	B	Michael Mai	United States	68.35	x	69.96	69.96	
28	B	Fatih Eryildirim	Turkey	x	69.37	69.04	69.37	
29	A	Lee Yun-chul	South Korea	x	67.14	68.98	68.98	SB
30	A	Mostafa Al-Gamel	Egypt	x	64.17	68.38	68.38	
31	A	Kaveh Mousavi	Iran	x	68.01	x	68.01	
32	B	Mattias Jons	Sweden	67.93	x	x	67.93	
33	B	Javier Cienfuegos	Spain	x	66.78	67.49	67.49	
34	B	Juan Ignacio Cerra	Argentina	63.04	x	64.27	64.27	
35	B	Amanmurad Hommadov	Turkmenistan	61.31	59.94	62.97	62.97	

=== Final ===
Rank	Athlete	Nationality	#1	#2	#3	#4	#5	#6	Result	Notes
1st place, gold medalist(s)	Koji Murofushi	Japan	79.72	81.03	81.24	79.42	81.24	80.83	81.24	SB
2nd place, silver medalist(s)	Krisztián Pars	Hungary	77.26	78.84	79.14	79.97	60.34	81.18	81.18	SB
3rd place, bronze medalist(s)	Primož Kozmus	Slovenia	77.50	79.39	78.93	x	76.01	78.19	79.39	SB
4	Markus Esser	Germany	x	78.56	76.71	75.01	79.12	77.88	79.12	
5	Pavel Kryvitski	Belarus	73.98	78.24	78.53	x	77.35	x	78.53	
6	Kirill Ikonnikov	Russia	x	x	77.22	x	78.37	78.12	78.37	
7	Szymon Ziółkowski	Poland	75.04	77.64	76.75	x	74.99	75.10	77.64	
8	Nicola Vizzoni	Italy	77.04	76.31	76.94	76.01	75.82	x	77.04	
9	Olli-Pekka Karjalainen	Finland	75.38	76.60	71.34				76.60	SB
10	Dilshod Nazarov	Tajikistan	75.05	74.34	76.58				76.58	
11	Paweł Fajdek	Poland	74.86	x	75.20				75.20	
	Yury Shayunou	Belarus	x	x	x				NM	
