= Italy at the 2011 World Championships in Athletics =

- WA code: ITA
- National federation: FIDAL
- Website: www.fidal.it

in Daegu
- Competitors: 30 (15 men, 15 women)
- Medals Ranked 23rd: Gold 0 Silver 1 Bronze 1 Total 2

World Championships in Athletics appearances (overview)
- 1976; 1980; 1983; 1987; 1991; 1993; 1995; 1997; 1999; 2001; 2003; 2005; 2007; 2009; 2011; 2013; 2015; 2017; 2019; 2022; 2023; 2025

Italy competed at the 2011 World Championships in Athletics from August 27 to September 4 in Daegu, South Korea.

== Medalists ==
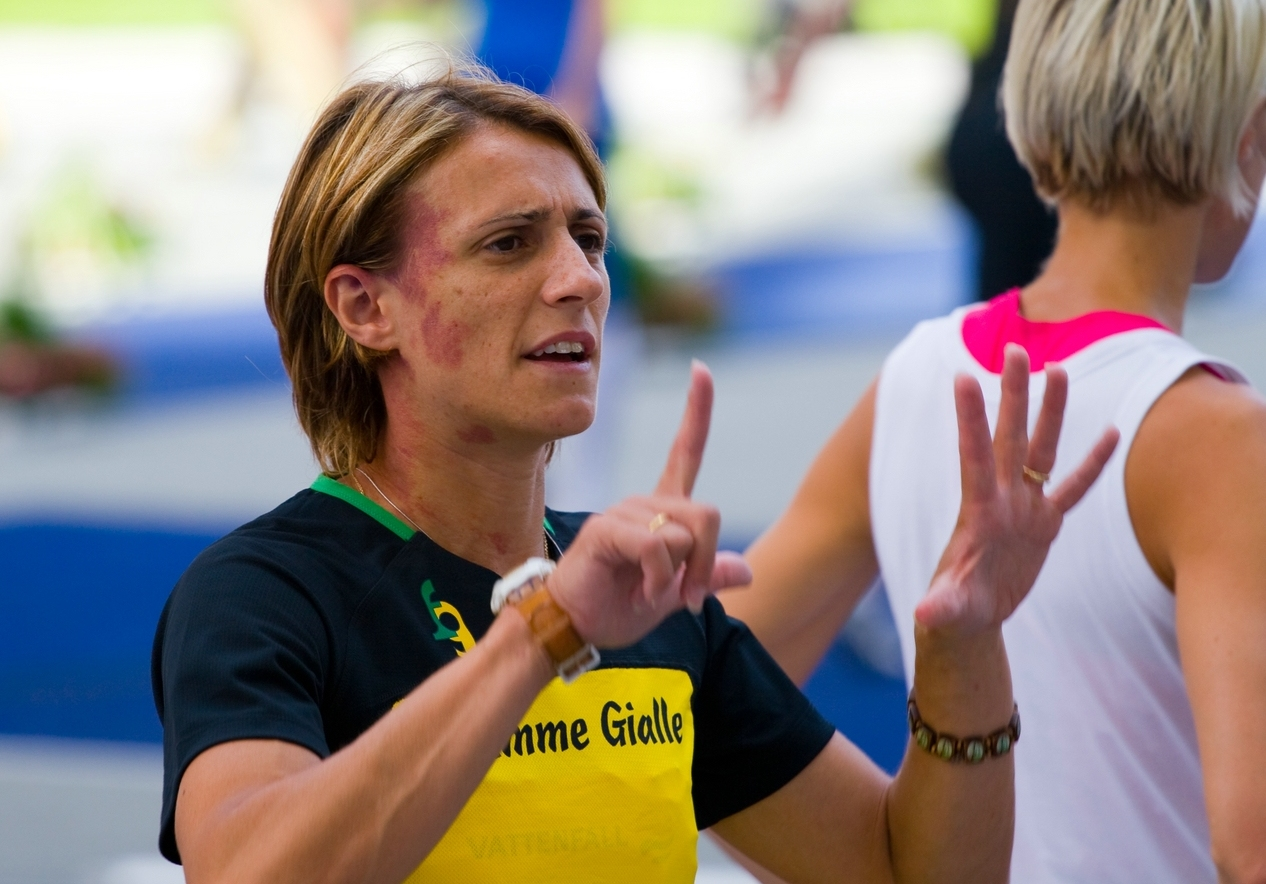
Antonietta Di Martino won a bronze medal in Women's High Jump at this year's championships (foto archived from Berlin 2010)

Athlete	Gendre	Event	Medal
Elisa Rigaudo	Women	20 km walk	Silver
Antonietta Di Martino	Women	High jump	Bronze

== Finalists ==
Italy national athletics team ranked 17th (with 7 finalists) in the IAAF placing table. Rank obtained by assigning eight points in the first place and so on to the eight finalists.

Advanced after Russian doping scandal, Elisa Rigaudo (from 4th to 2nd), Alex Schwazer (from 9th to 7th) and Silvia Salis (from 9th to 8th).

Rank	Country	1st place, gold medalist(s)	2nd place, silver medalist(s)	3rd place, bronze medalist(s)	4	5	6	7	8	Pts
17	Italy	0	1	1	0	2	0	1	2	25

== Team selection ==
The Italian Federation has announced a team of 33 athletes for the forthcoming event. The captain of this team is Nicola Vizzoni, at his eight consecutive participations to Worlds Championships. The team will be led by Olympic 50 km Race walk champion Alex Schwazer and European Indoor champions Antonietta Di Martino (High Jump) and Simona La Mantia (Triple Jump).

The following athletes appeared on the preliminary Entry List, but not on the Official Start List of the specific event, resulting in a total number of 30 competitors:

KEY:	Did not participate	Competed in another event

	Event	Athlete
Men	4 x 100 metres relay	Matteo Galvan
Men	4 x 100 metres relay	Jacques Riparelli
Women	4 x 400 metres relay	Manuela Gentili
Women	4 x 400 metres relay	Elena Bonfanti

== Results ==
For the Italian national team participated at the events 30 athletes, 15 men and 15 women.

Finalists (first eight positions)

=== Men (15) ===
Athlete	Event	Preliminaries		Heats		Semifinals		Final	
Athlete	Event	Time Width Height	Rank	Time Width Height	Rank	Time Width Height	Rank	Time Width Height	Rank
Daniele Meucci	5000 metres			13:39:90 q	13			13:29:11	10
Daniele Meucci	10,000 metres							28:50.28	12
Ruggero Pertile	Marathon							2:11:57	8
Emanuele Abate	110 m hurdles			13.63	21	Did not advance			
Michael Tumi; Simone Collio; Emanuele Di Gregorio; Fabio Cerutti	4 x 100 metres relay			38:41 (SB)	7			38:96	5
Alex Schwazer	20 kilometres walk							1:21:50 (SB)	6
Giorgio Rubino	20 kilometres walk							DSQ	
Marco De Luca	50 kilometres walk							3:49:40 (SB)	12
Jean-Jacques Nkouloukidi	50 kilometres walk							3:52:35 (PB)	16
Fabrizio Donato	Triple jump	16.88 q	10					16.77	10
Fabrizio Schembri	Triple jump	16.71	14					Did not advance	
Silvano Chesani	High jump	2.25	22					Did not advance	
Nicola Vizzoni	Hammer throw	76.74 q	8					77.04	8

=== Women (15) ===
Athlete	Event	Preliminaries		Heats		Semifinals		Final	
Athlete	Event	Time Width Height	Rank	Time Width Height	Rank	Time Width Height	Rank	Time Width Height	Rank
Marta Milani	400 metres		51.94 Q, SB	12	51.86 PB	13	Did not advance		
Marzia Caravelli	100 m hurdles		13.29	26	Did not advance				
Manuela Gentili	400 m hurdles		56.71	25	Did not advance				
Chiara Bazzoni; Maria Enrica Spacca; Libania Grenot; Marta Milani	4 x 400 metres relay		3:26.48 SB	9		Did not advance			
Elisa Rigaudo	20 kilometres walk							1:30:44 SB	2
Simona La Mantia	Triple jump	14.06	15					Did not advance	
Antonietta Di Martino	High jump	1.95 Q	1					2.00	3
Raffaella Lamera	High jump	1.85	25					Did not advance	
Anna Giordano Bruno	Pole vault	4.40	22					Did not advance	
Chiara Rosa	Shot put	18.28	14					Did not advance	
Silvia Salis	Hammer throw	69.82 q	10					69:88	8
Zahra Bani	Javelin throw	58.92	14					Did not advance	

Heptathlon

Athlete	Heptathlon			
Athlete	Event	Results	Points	Rank
Francesca Doveri	100 m hurdles	13.44 SB	1059	11
Francesca Doveri	High jump	1.71 SB	867	25
Francesca Doveri	Shot put	11.76	645	24
Francesca Doveri	200 m	25.45	846	20
Francesca Doveri	Long jump	6.09	877	15
Francesca Doveri	Javelin throw	35.09 SB	573	26
Francesca Doveri	800 m	2:13.14	919	9
Total			5786	23
