= United States at the 2011 World Championships in Athletics =

- WA code: USA
- National federation: USA Track & Field
- Website: www.usatf.org

in Daegu
- Competitors: 127
- Medals Ranked 1st: Gold 12 Silver 9 Bronze 7 Total 28

World Championships in Athletics appearances (overview)
- 1976; 1980; 1983; 1987; 1991; 1993; 1995; 1997; 1999; 2001; 2003; 2005; 2007; 2009; 2011; 2013; 2015; 2017; 2019; 2022; 2023; 2025

The United States of America competed at the 2011 World Championships in Athletics from August 27 to September 4 in Daegu, South Korea.

== Team selection ==
The team was led by reigning World Champions LaShawn Merritt (400m), Kerron Clement (400m hurdles), Dwight Phillips (long jump), Christian Cantwell (shot put), and Trey Hardee (decathlon) in the men's team, and Allyson Felix (200m), Sanya Richards-Ross (400m), and Brittney Reese (long jump) in the women's team.

In the final roster Debbie Dunn and Delilah DiCrescenzo withdrew due to injury and were replaced. Michael Rodgers withdrew after testing positive for the banned stimulant methylhexaneamine at a meeting in Italy in July.. Trell Kimmons replaced him in the 100m. Jeremy Dodson was forced to withdraw after his passport was confiscated following his arrest on a charge of identity theft.

The final team on the entry list comprises the names of 155 athletes, including 2 athletes invited by the IPC for exhibition events: Joshua George, 400m T53 (wheelchair) men, and Amberlynn Weber, 800m T54 (wheelchair) women.

After all, 127 athletes competed in the different events.

== Medalists ==
The following competitors from the United States of America won medals at the Championships

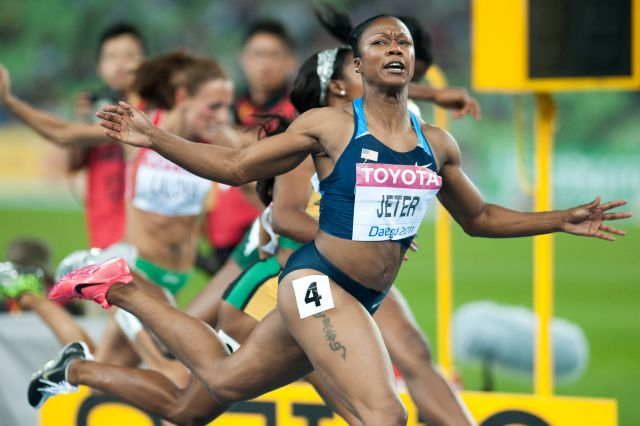
Carmelita Jeter won two gold medals (100m and 4 × 100 m relay) and one silver medal (200m) at this year's championships

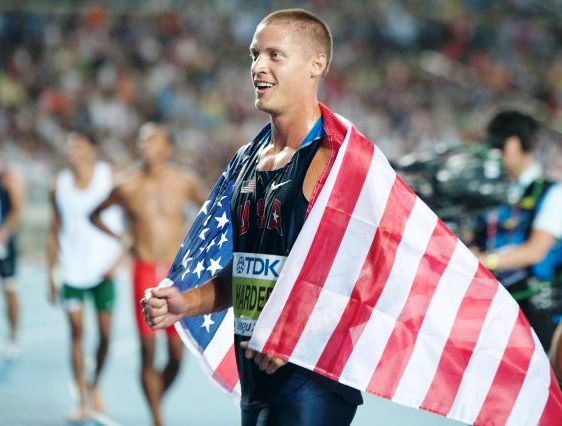
Trey Hardee defended his title in decathlon and won a gold medal at this year's championships

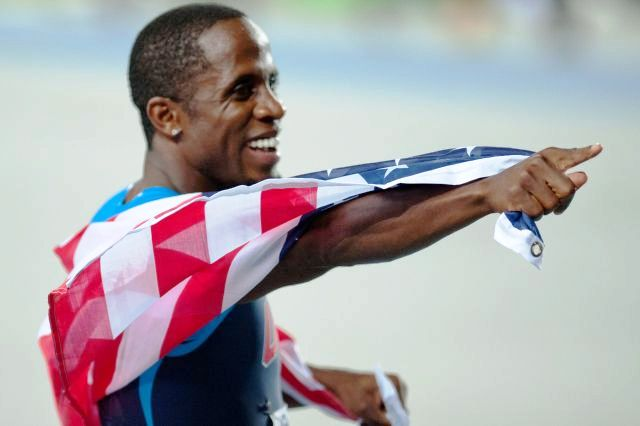
Dwight Phillips defended his title in the Men's Long Jump competition and won a gold medal at this year's championships

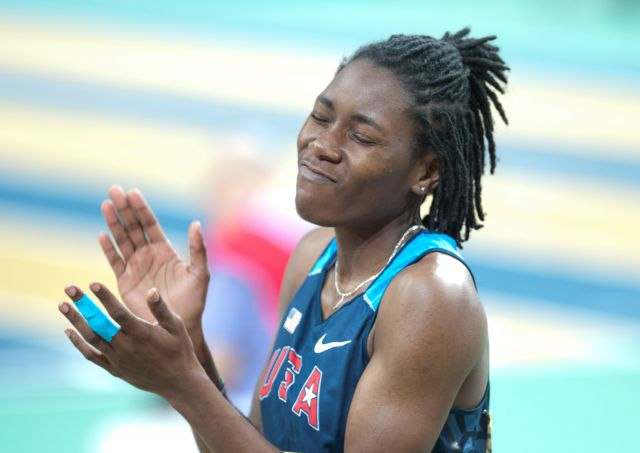
Brittney Reese defended her title in the Women's Long Jump competition and won a gold medal at this year's championships (archived from 2010)

Medal	Athlete	Event
Gold	Jason Richardson	110 m hurdles
Gold	Greg Nixon; Bershawn Jackson; Angelo Taylor; LaShawn Merritt; Jamaal Torrance; Michael Berry	4 x 400 metres relay
Gold	Dwight Phillips	Long jump
Gold	Christian Taylor	Triple jump
Gold	Jesse Williams	High jump
Gold	Trey Hardee	Decathlon
Gold	Carmelita Jeter	100 metres
Gold	Jennifer Simpson	1500 metres
Gold	Lashinda Demus	400 m hurdles
Gold	Bianca Knight; Allyson Felix; Marshevet Myers; Carmelita Jeter; Alexandria Anderson; Shalonda Solomon	4 x 100 metres relay
Gold	Sanya Richards-Ross; Allyson Felix; Jessica Beard; Francena McCorory; Natasha Hastings; Keshia Baker	4 x 400 metres relay
Gold	Brittney Reese	Long jump
Silver	Walter Dix	100 metres
Silver	Walter Dix	200 metres
Silver	LaShawn Merritt	400 metres
Silver	Bernard Lagat	5000 metres
Silver	Ashton Eaton	Decathlon
Silver	Carmelita Jeter	200 metres
Silver	Allyson Felix	400 metres
Silver	Danielle Carruthers	100 m hurdles
Silver	Jillian Camarena-Williams	Shot put
Bronze	Matthew Centrowitz, Jr.	1500 metres
Bronze	William Claye	Triple jump
Bronze	Allyson Felix	200 metres
Bronze	Dawn Harper	100 m hurdles
Bronze	Christian Cantwell	Shot put
Bronze	Francena McCorory	400 metres
Bronze	Alysia Montaño	800 metres

== Results ==
=== Men ===
==== Track and road events ====
Athlete	Event	Preliminaries		Heats		Semifinals		Final	
Athlete	Event	Time	Rank	Time	Rank	Time	Rank	Time	Rank
Walter Dix	100 metres	Bye		10.25	5 Q	10.05	2 Q	10.08	2nd place, silver medalist(s)
Trell Kimmons	100 metres	Bye		10.32	13 Q	10.21	11	Did not advance	
Justin Gatlin	100 metres	Bye		10.31	11 Q	10.23	13	Did not advance	
Walter Dix	200 metres			20.42	2	20.37	4	19.70 SB	2nd place, silver medalist(s)
Darvis Patton	200 metres			20.80	21	20.72	12	Did not advance	
Jeremy Dodson	200 metres			20.92	30	Did not advance			
LaShawn Merritt	400 metres			44.35 WL	1	44.76	1	44.63	2nd place, silver medalist(s)
Greg Nixon	400 metres			45.16	7	45.51	9	Did not advance	
Jamaal Torrance	400 metres			45.44	16	45.73	14	Did not advance	
Tony McQuay	400 metres			46.76	26	Did not advance			
Nicholas Symmonds	800 metres			1:46.54	12 Q	1:45.73	10 Q	1:45.12	5
Khadevis Robinson	800 metres			1:48.41	32 Q	1:45.27	8	Did not advance	
Charles Jock	800 metres			1:47.95	27	Did not advance			
Matthew Centrowitz, Jr.	1500 metres			3:39.46	6	3:46.66	13	3:36.08	3rd place, bronze medalist(s)
Leonel Manzano	1500 metres			3:40.77	16	3:47.98	21	Did not advance	
Andrew Wheating	1500 metres			3:42.68	29	Did not advance			
Bernard Lagat	5000 metres			13:33.90	1			13:23.64	2nd place, silver medalist(s)
Galen Rupp	5000 metres			13:34.91	5			13:28.64	9
Andrew Bumbalough	5000 metres			13:44.38	17			Did not advance	
Galen Rupp	10,000 metres							27:26.84 SB	7
Matt Tegenkamp	10,000 metres							28:41.62	10
Scott Bauhs	10,000 metres							29:03.92	14
Michael Morgan	Marathon							2:18:30 SB	31
Mike Sayenko	Marathon							2:22:49 SB	37
Jeffrey Eggleston	Marathon							2:23:33	39
Nicholas Arciniaga	Marathon							2:24:06	41
Sergio Reyes	Marathon							2:29:15 SB	45
Jason Richardson	110 m hurdles			13.19	1	13.11	1	13.16	(gold)
David Oliver	110 m hurdles			13.27	3	13.40	5	13.44	4
Aries Merritt	110 m hurdles			13.36	6	13.32	4	13.67	5
Bershawn Jackson	400 m hurdles			49.82	21	48.80	3	49.24	6
Angelo Taylor	400 m hurdles			49.38	12	48.86	5	49.31	7
Jeshua Anderson	400 m hurdles			48.81	7	49.33	12	Did not advance	
Kerron Clement	400 m hurdles			48.91	8	52.11	24	Did not advance	
Daniel Huling	3000 metres steeplechase			8:34.70	24			Did not advance	
Benjamin Bruce	3000 metres steeplechase			8:39.96	30			Did not advance	
William Nelson	3000 metres steeplechase			8:51.20	33			Did not advance	
Trell Kimmons; Justin Gatlin; Darvis Patton; Walter Dix; Travis Padgett; Maurice Mitchell	4 x 100 metres relay			37.79 WL	1			DNF	
Greg Nixon; Bershawn Jackson; Angelo Taylor; LaShawn Merritt; Jamaal Torrance; Michael Berry	4 x 400 metres relay			2:58.82 WL	1			2:59.31	1st place, gold medalist(s)
Trevor Barron	20 kilometres walk							1:24:33	23

==== Field events ====
Athlete	Event	Qualification		Final	
Athlete	Event	Result	Rank	Result	Rank
Dwight Phillips	Long jump	8.32 SB	1	8.45 SB	1st place, gold medalist(s)
William Claye	Long jump	8.09	7	8.10	9
Marquise Goodwin	Long jump	8.02	13	Did not advance	
Trevell Quinley	Long jump	7.09	31	Did not advance	
Christian Taylor	Triple jump	16.99	9	17.96 WL, PB	1st place, gold medalist(s)
William Claye	Triple jump	17.19	3	17.50 PB	3rd place, bronze medalist(s)
Walter Davis	Triple jump	16.12	23	Did not advance	
Jesse Williams	High jump	2.31	5	2.35	1st place, gold medalist(s)
Erik Kynard	High jump	2.28	14	Did not advance	
Dustin Jonas	High jump	2.16	30	Did not advance	
Jeremy Scott	Pole vault	5.60	9	5.65	9
Derek Miles	Pole vault	5.60	10	5.65	13
Mark Hollis	Pole vault	5.35	22	Did not advance	
Christian Cantwell	Shot put	20.73	6	21.36	3rd place, bronze medalist(s)
Reese Hoffa	Shot put	20.96	3	20.99	5
Ryan Whiting	Shot put	20.77	5	20.75	7
Adam Nelson	Shot put	20.23	11	20.29	8
Jason Young	Discus throw	63.14	11	63.20	10
Jarred Rome	Discus throw	62.22	14	Did not advance	
Lance Brooks	Discus throw	61.07	24	Did not advance	
Kibwe Johnson	Hammer throw	75.06	14	Did not advance	
Michael Mai	Hammer throw	69.96	27	Did not advance	
Mike Hazle	Javelin throw	DNS		Did not advance	

==== Decathlon ====
Trey Hardee	|Decathlon			
Trey Hardee	Event	Results	Points	Rank
	100 m	10.55	963	2
	Long jump	7.45	922	4
	Shot put	15.09	795	9
	High jump	2.02 SB	822	11
	400 m	48.37	891	5
	110 m hurdles	13.97	978	2
	Discus throw	49.89 SB	868	3
	Pole vault	4.80	849	11
	Javelin throw	68.99 PB	874	2
	1500 m	4:45.68 SB	645	14
Total			8607	1st place, gold medalist(s)

Ashton Eaton	|Decathlon			
Ashton Eaton	Event	Results	Points	Rank
	100 m	10.46	985	1
	Long jump	7.46	925	3
	Shot put	14.44	755	17
	High jump	2.02	822	7
	400 m	46.99	959	1
	110 m hurdles	13.85	994	1
	Discus throw	46.17	791	11
	Pole vault	4.60	790	18
	Javelin throw	55.17	665	17
	1500 m	4:18.94 PB	819	3
Total			8505	2nd place, silver medalist(s)

Ryan Harlan	|Decathlon			
Ryan Harlan	Event	Results	Points	Rank
	100 m	11.29	797	28
	Long jump	6.68	739	27
	Shot put	16.49	882	1
	High jump	2.02	822	5
	400 m	51.57	744	26
	110 m hurdles	14.71	885	17
	Discus throw	43.52	736	17
	Pole vault	NM	0	
	Javelin throw	58.43	714	14
	1500 m	5:21.63	442	22
Total			6761	22

=== Women ===
==== Track and Road events ====
Athlete	Event	Preliminaries		Heats		Semifinals		Final	
Athlete	Event	Time	Rank	Time	Rank	Time	Rank	Time	Rank
Carmelita Jeter	100 metres			11.21	12 Q	11.02	1 Q	10.90	1st place, gold medalist(s)
Marshevet Myers	100 metres			11.16	7 Q	11.38	9 Q	11.33	8
Miki Barber	100 metres			11.40	27	Did not advance			
Carmelita Jeter	200 metres			22.68	3	22.47	2	22.37	2nd place, silver medalist(s)
Allyson Felix	200 metres			22.71	6	22.67	4	22.42	3rd place, bronze medalist(s)
Shalonda Solomon	200 metres			22.69	4	22.46	1	22.61	4
Jeneba Tarmoh	200 metres			23.60	27	Did not advance			
Allyson Felix	400 metres			51.45	7 Q	50.36	3 Q	49.59 PB	2nd place, silver medalist(s)
Francena McCorory	400 metres			52.18	14 Q	50.24 PB	2 Q	50.45	3rd place, bronze medalist(s)
Sanya Richards-Ross	400 metres			51.37	4 Q	50.66	8 q	51.32	7
Jessica Beard	400 metres			52.40	18 Q	51.27	11	Did not advance	
Alysia Montaño	800 metres			1:59.62	3	1:58.67	5	1:57.48 SB	3rd place, bronze medalist(s)
Maggie Vessey	800 metres			2:01.32	11	1:58.98	8	1:58.50 SB	6
Alice Schmidt	800 metres			2:01.11	8	2:01.16	16	Did not advance	
Jennifer Simpson	1500 metres			4:10.84	16	4:07.90	2	4:05.40	1st place, gold medalist(s)
Morgan Uceny	1500 metres			4:07.43	3	4:09.03	14	4:19.71	10
Shannon Rowbury	1500 metres			4:14.43	28	4:11.49	21	Did not advance	
Lauren Fleshman	5000 metres			15:34.04	11			15:09.25	7
Amy Hastings	5000 metres			15:29.49	6			15:56.06	15
Molly Huddle	5000 metres			15:42.00	19			Did not advance	
Shalane Flanagan	10,000 metres							31:25.57	7
Jennifer Rhines	10,000 metres							31:47.59	9
Kara Goucher	10,000 metres							32:29.58	13
Tera Moody	Marathon							2:32:04 SB	17
Katherine Newberry	Marathon							2:37:28 SB	30
Alissa McKaig	Marathon							2:38:23 SB	32
Colleen DeRuck	Marathon							2:44:35 SB	38
Zoila Gomez	Marathon							2:46:44 SB	40
Danielle Carruthers	100 m hurdles			12.79	3	12.65	3	12.47 PB	2nd place, silver medalist(s)
Dawn Harper	100 m hurdles			12.90	8	12.74	5	12.47 PB	3rd place, bronze medalist(s)
Kellie Wells	100 m hurdles			12.73	2	12.79	7	DNF	
Lashinda Demus	400 m hurdles			54.93	3 Q	53.82	1 Q	52.47 WL	1st place, gold medalist(s)
Queen Harrison	400 m hurdles			55.11	6 Q	55.44	12	Not advance	
Jasmine Chaney	400 m hurdles			56.28	20 Q	55.97	16	Not advance	
Emma Coburn	3000 metres steeplechase			9:38.42	14			9:51.40	13
Bridget Franek	3000 metres steeplechase			9:43.09	18			Did not advance	
Stephanie Garcia	3000 metres steeplechase			9:53.47	21			Did not advance	
Bianca Knight; Allyson Felix; Marshevet Myers; Carmelita Jeter; Alexandria Anderson; Shalonda Solomon	4 x 100 metres relay			41.94 WL	1			41.56 WL	1st place, gold medalist(s)
Sanya Richards-Ross; Allyson Felix; Jessica Beard; Francena McCorory; Natasha Hastings; Keshia Baker	4 x 400 metres relay			3:23.57	4			3:18.09 WL	1st place, gold medalist(s)
Maria Michta	20 kilometres walk							1:38:54	30

==== Field events ====
Athlete	Event	Qualification		Final	
Athlete	Event	Result	Rank	Result	Rank
Brittney Reese	Long jump	6.79	3 Q	6.82	1st place, gold medalist(s)
Janay DeLoach	Long jump	6.51	12 q	6.56	6
Funmi Jimoh	Long jump	6.68	6 q	NM	
Tori Polk	Long jump	5.66	33	Did not advance	
Amanda Smock	Triple jump	13.48	31	Did not advance	
Brigetta Barrett	High jump	1.95	1	1.93	10
Inika McPherson	High jump	1.80	27	Did not advance	
Jennifer Suhr	Pole vault	4.55	6	4.70	4
Kylie Hutson	Pole vault	4.50	15	Did not advance	
Lacy Janson	Pole vault	4.40	20	Did not advance	
Jillian Camarena-Williams	Shot put	19.09	5 Q	20.02	2nd place, silver medalist(s)
Michelle Carter	Shot put	18.85	11 Q	18.76	9
Sarah Stevens-Walker	Shot put	17.20	21	Did not advance	
Stephanie Brown-Trafton	Discus throw	61.89	6 q	63.85	5
Aretha Thurmond	Discus throw	59.88	13	Did not advance	
Gia Lewis-Smallwood	Discus throw	59.49	15	Did not advance	
Jessica Cosby	Hammer throw	71.06	8	68.91	11
Amber Campbell	Hammer throw	68.87	14	Did not advance	
Jeneva McCall	Hammer throw	68.26	15	Did not advance	
Rachel Yurkovich	Javelin throw	58.84	15	Did not advance	
Kara Patterson	Javelin throw	57.14	21	Did not advance	

==== Heptathlon ====
Sharon Day	Heptathlon			
Sharon Day	Event	Results	Points	Rank
	100 m hurdles	13.69 PB	1023	20
	High jump	1.80	978	15
	Shot put	14.28 PB	813	11
	200 m	25.01	886	13
	Long jump	5.87	810	25
	Javelin throw	39.14	651	23
	800 m	2:15.74 SB	882	17
Total			6043	18

Hyleas Fountain	Heptathlon			
Hyleas Fountain	Event	Results	Points	Rank
	100 m hurdles	12.93 SB	1135	1
	High jump	1.89 SB	1093	1
	Shot put	12.20	674	23
	200 m	23.96	985	4
	Long jump	6.45	991	4
	Javelin throw	43.42 SB	733	13
	800 m	DNF	0	
Total			5611	25

== Reserves ==
According to the qualification standards USA Track & Field nominated more athletes (having achieved the A qualification mark, "reserves") than allowed to compete in each specific event.

The following athletes appeared on the preliminary Entry List, but not on the Official Start List of the specific event, resulting in a total number of 127 competitors:

KEY:	Did not participate	Competed in another event

	Event	Athlete
Men	100 metres	Michael Rodgers
Men	200 metres	Maurice Mitchell
Men	400 metres	Michael Berry
Men	800 metres	Tyler Mulder
Men	1500 metres	Will Leer
Men	5000 metres	Chris Solinsky
Men	10,000 metres	Bobby Curtis
Men	110 m hurdles	Terrence Trammell
Men	400 m hurdles	Michael Tinsley
Men	4 x 100 metres relay	Ivory Williams
Men	4 x 100 metres relay	Michael Rodgers
Men	4 x 400 metres relay	Tony McQuay
Men	4 x 400 metres relay	Miles Smith
Men	20 kilometres walk	John Nunn
Men	High jump	Ricky Robertson
Men	Pole vault	Scott Roth
Men	Shot put	Daniel Taylor
Men	Discus throw	Russell Winger
Men	Javelin throw	Sean Furey
Women	100 metres	LaShaunte’a Moore
Women	200 metres	Bianca Knight
Women	400 metres	Keshia Baker
Women	800 metres	Phoebe Wright
Women	1500 metres	Christin Wurth-Thomas
Women	10,000 metres	Desiree Davila
Women	100 m hurdles	Ginnie Crawford
Women	400 m hurdles	Turquoise Thompson
Women	3000 metres steeplechase	Sara Hall
Women	4 x 100 metres relay	Miki Barber
Women	4 x 100 metres relay	LaShaunte’a Moore
Women	20 kilometres walk	Teresa Vaill
Women	Long jump	Brianna Glenn
Women	Pole vault	Melissa Gergel
Women	Discus throw	Suzanne Powell-Roos
