= Belarus at the 2011 World Championships in Athletics =

- WA code: BLR
- National federation: Belarus Athletic Federation
- Website: www.bfla.eu

in Daegu
- Competitors: 22
- Medals: Gold 0 Silver 1 Bronze 1 Total 2

World Championships in Athletics appearances
- 1993; 1995; 1997; 1999; 2001; 2003; 2005; 2007; 2009; 2011; 2013; 2015; 2017; 2019; 2022; 2023

Belarus competed at the 2011 World Championships in Athletics from August 27 to September 4 in Daegu, South Korea.

== Team selection ==
A team of 23 athletes was announced to represent the country in the event.

The following athletes appeared on the preliminary Entry List, but not on the Official Start List of the specific event, resulting in total number of 22 competitors:

KEY:	Did not participate	Competed in another event

	Event	Athlete
Women	4 x 400 metres relay	Iryna Khliustava
Women	4 x 400 metres relay	Maryna Arzamasava

== Medalists ==
The following Belarusian competitors won medals at the Championships

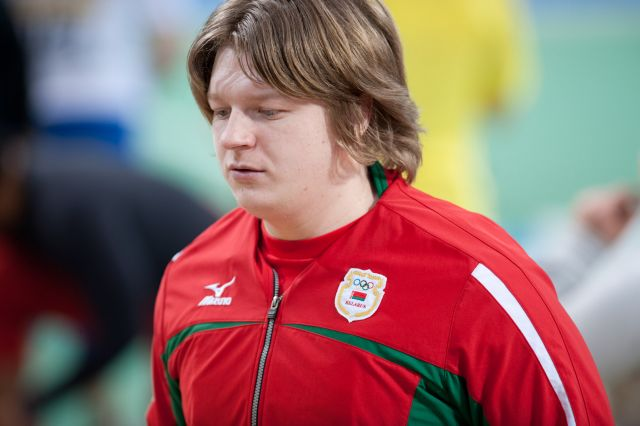
Nadzeya Ostapchuk won a silver medal (Women's Shot Put) at this year's championships (foto archived from Doha 2010)

Medal	Athlete	Event
Silver	Nadzeya Ostapchuk	Shot put
Bronze	Andrei Mikhnevich	Shot put

== Results ==
=== Men ===
Athlete	Event	Preliminaries		Heats		Semifinals		Final	
Athlete	Event	Time Width Height	Rank	Time Width Height	Rank	Time Width Height	Rank	Time Width Height	Rank
Andrei Mikhnevich	Shot put	20.79	4 Q					21.40	3rd place, bronze medalist(s)
Pavel Lyzhyn	Shot put	19.91	16					Did not advance	
Pavel Kryvitski	Hammer throw	78.16	2 Q					78.53	5
Yury Shayunou	Hammer throw	76.74	7 q					NM	
Valeriy Sviatokha	Hammer throw	71.58	23					Did not advance	

=== Women ===
Athlete	Event	Preliminaries		Heats		Semifinals		Final	
Athlete	Event	Time Width Height	Rank	Time Width Height	Rank	Time Width Height	Rank	Time Width Height	Rank
Maryna Arzamasava	800 metres			2:01.97	19 Q	2:02.13	21	Did not advance	
Sviatlana Usovich	800 metres			2:05.62	33	Did not advance			
Natallia Kareiva	1500 metres			4:12.03	19	Did not advance			
Hanna Bahdanovich; Yuliya Balykina; Alena Neumiarzhitskaya; Hanna Liapeshka	4 x 100 metres relay			44.38	15			Did not advance	
Hanna Tashpulatava; Yulyana Yushchanka; Ilona Usovich; Sviatlana Usovich	4 x 400 metres relay			3:24.28 SB	6 q			3:25.64	6
Nastassia Yatsevich	20 kilometres walk							1:34:09	18
Nastassia Mironchyk-Ivanova	Long jump	6.80	2 Q					6.74	4
Veronika Shutkova	Long jump	6.45	16					Did not advance	
Anastasiya Shvedova	Pole vault	4.40	18					Did not advance	
Nadzeya Ostapchuk	Shot put	19.11	4 Q					20.05	2nd place, silver medalist(s)
Natallia Mikhnevich	Shot put	18.88	10 Q					18.47	11
Alena Matoshka	Hammer throw	68.23	16					Did not advance	
