= Botswana at the 2011 World Championships in Athletics =

- WA code: BOT
- National federation: Botswana Athletics Association
- Website: www.fecoa.org

in Daegu
- Competitors: 3
- Medals: Gold 1 Silver 0 Bronze 0 Total 1

World Championships in Athletics appearances
- 1983; 1987; 1991; 1993; 1995; 1997; 1999; 2001; 2003; 2005; 2007; 2009; 2011; 2013; 2015; 2017; 2019; 2022; 2023; 2025

Botswana competed at the 2011 World Championships in Athletics from August 27 to September 4 in Daegu, South Korea.

== Team selection ==
A team of 3 athletes was announced to represent the country in the event.

== Medalists ==
The following competitor from Botswana won a medal at the Championships

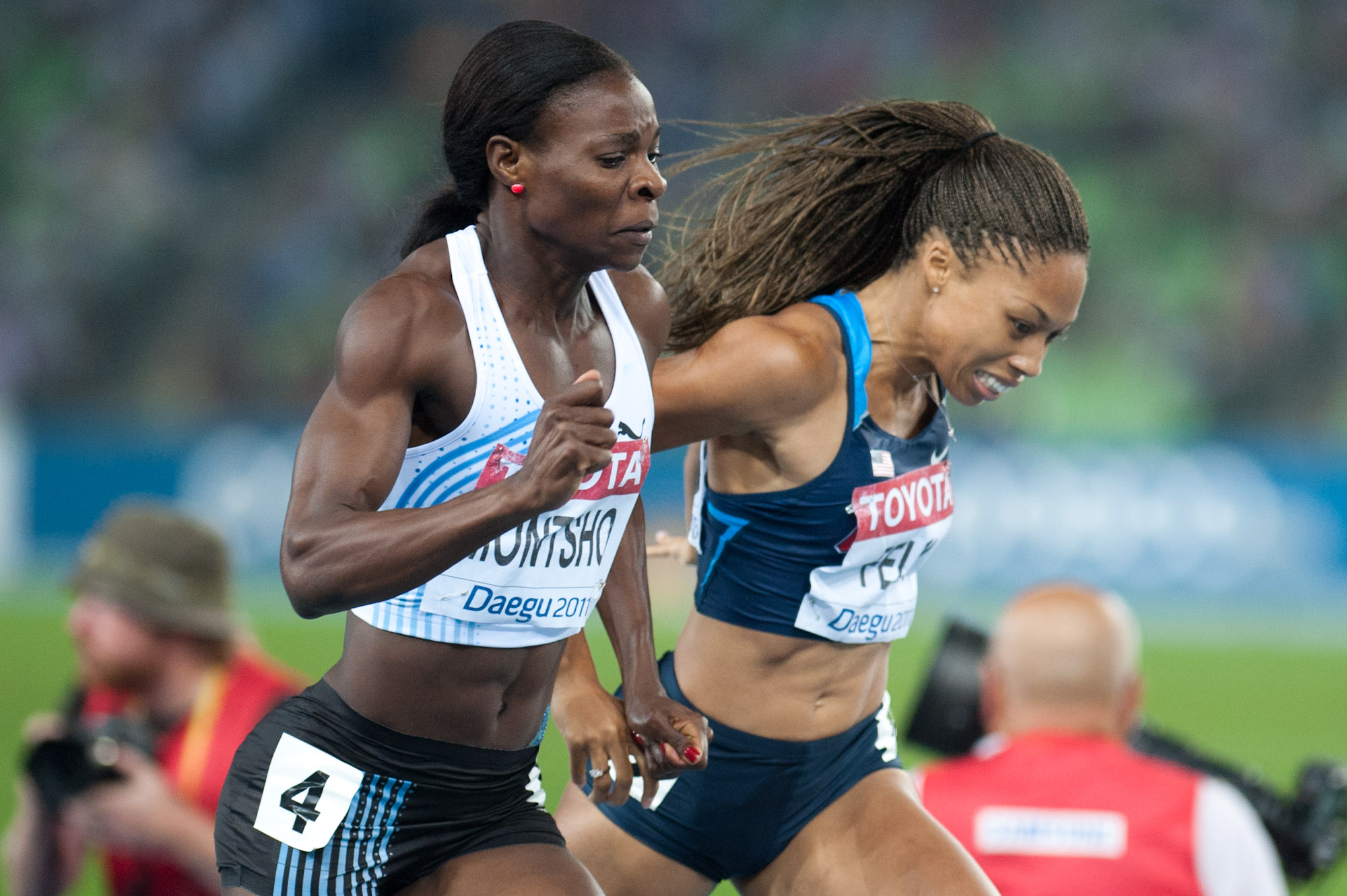
Amantle Montsho narrowly defeated Allyson Felix to become Botswana's first World or Olympic track and field champion

Medal	Athlete	Event
Gold	Amantle Montsho	400 metres

== Results ==
=== Men ===
==== Track and Road events ====
Athlete	Event	Heats		Semifinals		Final	
Athlete	Event	Result	Rank	Result	Rank	Result	Rank
Pako Seribe	400 metres	46.97	27	Did not advance			

==== Field events ====
Athlete	Event	Qualification		Final	
Athlete	Event	Result	Rank	Result	Rank
Kabelo Kgosiemang	High jump	2.21	25	Did not advance	

=== Women ===
==== Track and Road events ====
Athlete	Event	Heats		Semifinals		Final	
Athlete	Event	Result	Rank	Result	Rank	Result	Rank
Amantle Montsho	400 metres	50.95	1 Q	50.13	1	49.56 NR	1st place, gold medalist(s)
