= 2011 World Championships in Athletics – Women's heptathlon =

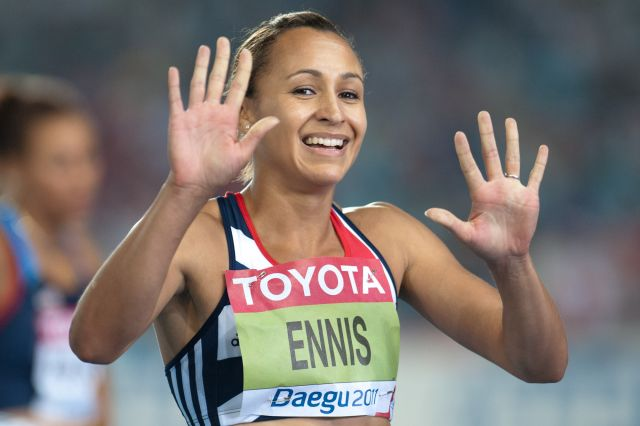
Gold medalist Jessica Ennis during the championships

Day 1-1 Video Day 1-2 Video Day 2-1 Video Day 2-2 Video

The Women's Heptathlon at the 2011 World Championships in Athletics was held at the Daegu Stadium on 29 and 30 August.

Before the competition, reigning champion Jessica Ennis was top of the year's heptathlon rankings (6790 points) and was closely followed by Tatyana Chernova who had set a personal best. The 2009 silver medallist Jennifer Oeser was also in good form while Nataliya Dobrynska and Hyleas Fountain (first and second at the 2008 Olympics) were the other high-profile competitors. Tatyana Chernova won the gold medal finishing 129 points ahead of Jessica Ennis.

Hyleas Fountain started the event powerfully, looking like she was in it to win it. She squeezed out a 0.02-second victory in the 100 metres hurdles and added a 3 cm advantage in the high jump, just a centimeter below her personal best, to give her a 39-point lead. Then things began to unravel. She gave up over two metres in the Shot put, where defending champion Jessica Ennis and returning silver medalist Tatyana Chernova powered through. Chernova was gaining from the beginning of the second day with a 10 cm advantage in the long jump. But the real break occurred when Chernova gained exactly 13 metres on Ennis in the javelin, a 250-point swing. Jennifer Oeser used her strong javelin throw to place herself firmly in third. Karolina Tyminska (lying in fourth place) and Ennis tried to run themselves into an advanced position in the 800 metres. While Tyminska won the 800, Oeser was able to stay close enough to her to hold on to the bronze. Ennis was just 2.6 seconds behind Tyminska, but Chernova would not let Ennis gain even a quarter of a second, much less the gold medal. On 29 November 2016 the IAAF stripped Chernova of the title, as well as many of her others, due to doping and the results were adjusted accordingly. This led to Ennis winning by 179 points.

With only two non-finishers, this edition of the women's heptathlon is notable for having the lowest fraction of athletes not finishing the competition in the World Championships history.

== Medalists ^{[a]} ==
Gold	Silver	Bronze
Jessica Ennis; Great Britain & N.I.	Jennifer Oeser; Germany	Karolina Tymińska; Poland

- ^{a} Following disqualification of Tatyana Chernova, Russia. Ennis and Oeser, but not Tymińska, attended the medal ceremony, held at the 2017 World Championships on 4 August 2017.

== Records ==
Prior to the competition, the established records were as follows.

World record	Jackie Joyner-Kersee (USA)	7291	Seoul, South Korea	24 September 1988
Championship record	Jackie Joyner-Kersee (USA)	7128	Rome, Italy	1 September 1987
World leading	Jessica Ennis (GBR)	6790	Götzis, Austria	29 May 2011
African record	Margaret Simpson (GHA)	6423	Götzis, Austria	29 May 2005
Asian record	Ghada Shouaa (SYR)	6942	Götzis, Austria	26 May 1996
North, Central American and Caribbean record	Jackie Joyner-Kersee (USA)	7291	Seoul, South Korea	24 September 1988
South American record	Lucimara da Silva (BRA)	6076	Beijing, China	16 August 2008
European record	Carolina Klüft (SWE)	7032	Osaka, Japan	26 August 2007
Oceanian record	Jane Flemming (AUS)	6695	Auckland, New Zealand	28 January 1990

== Qualification standards ==
A standard	B standard
6150 pts	5950 pts

== Schedule ==
Date	Time	Round
29 August 2011	10:00	100 metres hurdles
29 August 2011	11:00	High jump
29 August 2011	19:05	Shot put
29 August 2011	20:35	200 metres
30 August 2011	10:00	Long jump
30 August 2011	12:50	Javelin throw
30 August 2011	20:00	800 metres
30 August 2011	20:00	Final standings

== Results ==
=== 100 metres hurdles ===
Wind:
Heat 1: +0.4 m/s, Heat 2: +0.9 m/s, Heat 3: +1.6 m/s, Heat 4: +1.7 m/s

Rank	Heat	Name	Nationality	Time	Points	Notes
1	1	Hyleas Fountain	United States	12.93	1135	SB
2	1	Jessica Ennis	Great Britain & N.I.	12.94	1133	
3	1	Jessica Zelinka	Canada	13.01	1123	SB
4	2	Karolina Tymińska	Poland	13.12	1106	PB
5	1	Louise Hazel	Great Britain & N.I.	13.24	1089	PB
6	2	Tatyana Chernova	Russia	13.32	1077	PB
7	1	Jennifer Oeser	Germany	13.33	1075	
8	4	Sara Aerts	Belgium	13.38	1068	SB
9	3	Margaret Simpson	Ghana	13.43	1060	SB
9	4	Nataliya Dobrynska	Ukraine	13.43	1060	PB
11	2	Anna Bogdanova	Russia	13.44	1059	SB
11	2	Grit Šadeiko	Estonia	13.44	1059	PB
11	2	Francesca Doveri	Italy	13.44	1059	SB
14	1	Antoinette Nana Djimou Ida	France	13.48	1053	
15	2	Lyudmyla Yosypenko	Ukraine	13.49	1052	PB
16	3	Remona Fransen	Netherlands	13.57	1040	PB
17	3	Ruky Abdulai	Canada	13.60	1036	PB
18	3	Wassana Winatho	Thailand	13.62	1033	PB
19	1	Lilli Schwarzkopf	Germany	13.65	1028	
20	3	Sharon Day	United States	13.69	1023	PB
21	3	Jessica Samuelsson	Sweden	13.77	1011	PB
22	3	Kateřina Cachová	Czech Republic	13.81	1005	SB
23	4	Ida Marcussen	Norway	13.96	984	PB
23	4	Austra Skujytė	Lithuania	13.96	984	PB
25	2	Aiga Grabuste	Latvia	14.06	970	
26	4	Alina Fyodorova	Ukraine	14.06	970	PB
27	4	Julia Mächtig	Germany	14.15	957	SB
28	4	Györgyi Farkas	Hungary	14.32	934	

=== High jump ===
Rank	Group	Name	Nationality	1.59	1.62	1.65	1.68	1.71	1.74	1.77	1.80	1.83	1.86	1.89	1.92	Result	Points	Notes	Overall
1	A	Hyleas Fountain	United States	–	–	–	–	o	o	o	o	o	o	xxo	xxx	1.89	1093	SB	2228
2	A	Austra Skujytė	Lithuania	–	–	–	–	o	o	o	xo	xo	xo	xxx		1.86	1054		2038
3	A	Jessica Ennis	Great Britain & N.I.	–	–	–	–	–	o	o	xo	xo	xxo	xxx		1.86	1054		2187
4	A	Nataliya Dobrynska	Ukraine	–	–	–	–	o	o	o	o	o	xxx			1.83	1016	SB	2076
5	A	Anna Bogdanova	Russia	–	–	–	–	–	xo	o	o	o	xxx			1.83	1016		2075
6	A	Antoinette Nana Djimou Ida	France	–	–	–	–	xo	o	xxo	xo	o	xxx			1.83	1016	SB	2069
7	A	Lyudmyla Yosypenko	Ukraine	–	–	o	o	o	o	xo	xo	xo	xxx			1.83	1016	SB	2068
8	A	Tatyana Chernova	Russia	–	–	–	–	o	o	o	o	xxo	xxx			1.83	1016	SB	2093
9	A	Jennifer Oeser	Germany	–	–	–	–	o	o	xo	xo	xxo	xxx			1.83	1016	SB	2091
10	A	Remona Fransen	Netherlands	–	–	–	–	o	o	o	o	xxx				1.80	978		2018
10	B	Lilli Schwarzkopf	Germany	–	–	o	o	o	o	o	o	xxx				1.80	978	SB	2006
12	A	Ruky Abdulai	Canada	–	–	o	o	o	xo	o	o	xxx				1.80	978	SB	2014
12	B	Margaret Simpson	Ghana	–	–	o	o	o	o	xo	o	xxx				1.80	978	SB	2038
14	A	Alina Fyodorova	Ukraine	–	–	o	o	o	o	o	xo	xxx				1.80	978		1948
15	A	Sharon Day	United States	–	–	–	–	–	xo	o	xo	xxx				1.80	978		2001
16	B	Julia Mächtig	Germany	–	–	–	o	o	o	xo	xxo	xxx				1.80	978	SB	1935
16	B	Györgyi Farkas	Hungary	–	o	o	o	o	xo	o	xxo	xxx				1.80	978	SB	1912
18	A	Kateřina Cachová	Czech Republic	–	–	o	o	xxo	xo	o	xxx					1.77	941		1946
19	B	Grit Šadeiko	Estonia	–	o	o	o	o	xo	xxx						1.74	903		1962
20	B	Louise Hazel	Great Britain & N.I.	o	o	o	o	xo	xxo	xxx						1.74	903	PB	1992
21	B	Karolina Tymińska	Poland	–	–	xo	o	xxo	xxo	xxx						1.74	903	SB	2009
22	B	Sara Aerts	Belgium	–	xo	o	xxo	xxo	xxo	xxx						1.74	903	SB	1971
23	B	Ida Marcussen	Norway	–	–	o	xo	o	xxx							1.71	867		1851
24	B	Aiga Grabuste	Latvia	–	–	xo	xo	o	xxx							1.71	867		1837
25	B	Francesca Doveri	Italy	o	xo	o	xo	xxo	xxx							1.71	867	SB	1926
26	B	Jessica Zelinka	Canada	–	o	o	o	xxx								1.68	830		1953
26	B	Jessica Samuelsson	Sweden	–	o	o	o	xxx								1.68	830		1841
28	B	Wassana Winatho	Thailand	xo	o	o	xxo	xxx								1.68	830		1863

=== Shot put ===
Rank	Group	Name	Nationality	#1	#2	#3	Result	Points	Notes	Overall
1	A	Austra Skujytė	Lithuania	16.71	16.33	16.34	16.71	976		3014
2	A	Nataliya Dobrynska	Ukraine	15.62	16.14	15.67	16.14	937	SB	3013
3	A	Julia Mächtig	Germany	12.20	14.67	15.24	15.24	877	SB	2812
4	A	Jessica Zelinka	Canada	14.91	14.33	14.67	14.91	855	SB	2808
5	A	Lilli Schwarzkopf	Germany	14.08	14.56	14.89	14.89	854	PB	2860
6	A	Karolina Tymińska	Poland	14.53	14.40	14.70	14.70	841	SB	2850
7	A	Jessica Ennis	Great Britain & N.I.	14.67	14.51	14.57	14.67	839	PB	3026
8	A	Jessica Samuelsson	Sweden	14.12	14.30	14.52	14.52	829		2670
9	A	Anna Bogdanova	Russia	13.55	13.42	14.52	14.52	829	SB	2904
10	A	Aiga Grabuste	Latvia	12.13	X	14.46	14.46	825	SB	2662
11	B	Sharon Day	United States	14.28	12.74	X	14.28	813	PB	2814
12	A	Alina Fyodorova	Ukraine	14.09	14.18	X	14.18	806		2754
13	B	Tatyana Chernova	Russia	13.47	13.84	14.17	14.17	805	SB	2898
14	A	Antoinette Nana Djimou Ida	France	13.97	14.07	13.42	14.07	799		2868
15	A	Jennifer Oeser	Germany	13.30	13.70	13.56	13.70	774		2865
16	A	Remona Fransen	Netherlands	13.67	13.02	13.06	13.67	772		2790
17	B	Lyudmyla Yosypenko	Ukraine	11.99	13.02	13.16	13.16	738	PB	2806
18	B	Ida Marcussen	Norway	12.15	12.09	12.81	12.81	715		2566
19	B	Györgyi Farkas	Hungary	12.59	12.45	12.75	12.75	711		2623
20	B	Sara Aerts	Belgium	11.84	11.55	12.49	12.49	694		2665
21	B	Margaret Simpson	Ghana	12.47	12.48	12.39	12.48	693		2731
22	B	Louise Hazel	Great Britain & N.I.	12.28	X	12.36	12.36	685	SB	2677
23	B	Hyleas Fountain	United States	11.73	12.20	12.19	12.20	674		2902
24	B	Francesca Doveri	Italy	11.30	11.25	11.76	11.76	645		2571
25	B	Ruky Abdulai	Canada	11.37	11.72	10.81	11.72	643	PB	2657
26	B	Kateřina Cachová	Czech Republic	11.23	11.64	10.97	11.64	637		2583
27	B	Grit Šadeiko	Estonia	11.46	X	11.41	11.46	625		2587
	B	Wassana Winatho	Thailand				DNS	0		DNF

=== 200 metres ===
Wind:
Heat 1: -1.5 m/s, Heat 2: -1.2 m/s, Heat 3: -1.1 m/s, Heat 4: -1.3 m/s

Rank	Heat	Name	Nationality	Time	Points	Notes	Overall
1	1	Jessica Ennis	Great Britain & N.I.	23.27	1052		4078
2	1	Tatyana Chernova	Russia	23.50	1029	PB	3927
3	1	Karolina Tymińska	Poland	23.87	993		3843
4	1	Hyleas Fountain	United States	23.96	985		3887
5	1	Jessica Zelinka	Canada	24.06	975		3783
6	1	Lyudmyla Yosypenko	Ukraine	24.09	972		3778
7	2	Louise Hazel	Great Britain & N.I.	24.25	957		3634
8	2	Grit Šadeiko	Estonia	24.39	944	PB	3531
9	2	Ruky Abdulai	Canada	24.50	933		3590
10	2	Jessica Samuelsson	Sweden	24.55	929		3599
11	1	Jennifer Oeser	Germany	24.58	926		3791
12	2	Aiga Grabuste	Latvia	24.83	902		3564
13	3	Sharon Day	United States	25.01	886		3700
14	3	Remona Fransen	Netherlands	25.17	871		3661
15	2	Antoinette Nana Djimou Ida	France	25.19	869		3737
16	3	Margaret Simpson	Ghana	25.23	866		3597
17	4	Alina Fyodorova	Ukraine	25.35	855	PB	3609
17	3	Nataliya Dobrynska	Ukraine	25.35	855		3868
19	3	Kateřina Cachová	Czech Republic	25.36	854		3437
20	2	Francesca Doveri	Italy	25.45	846		3417
21	4	Julia Mächtig	Germany	25.54	838	SB	3650
22	4	Anna Bogdanova	Russia	25.64	829		3733
23	4	Ida Marcussen	Norway	25.74	820		3386
24	3	Lilli Schwarzkopf	Germany	25.82	813		3673
25	4	Austra Skujytė	Lithuania	26.04	794		3808
26	4	Györgyi Farkas	Hungary	26.35	767		3390
	4	Sara Aerts	Belgium	DNS	–		DNF

=== Long jump ===
Rank	Group	Name	Nationality	#1	#2	#3	Result	Points	Notes	Overall
1	A	Tatyana Chernova	Russia	6.38	6.61	X	6.61	1043		4970
2	A	Jessica Ennis	Great Britain & N.I.	6.27	6.51	6.30	6.51	1010	PB	5088
3	A	Aiga Grabuste	Latvia	6.31	5.96	6.45	6.45	991		4555
4	A	Hyleas Fountain	United States	6.45	X	6.28	6.45	991		4878
5	A	Karolina Tymińska	Poland	6.39	6.32	6.28	6.39	972		4815
6	A	Anna Bogdanova	Russia	6.38	5.60	6.09	6.38	969		4702
7	A	Ruky Abdulai	Canada	6.11	6.30	5.99	6.30	943		4533
8	A	Jennifer Oeser	Germany	X	6.28	6.14	6.28	937		4728
9	A	Grit Šadeiko	Estonia	X	X	6.28	6.28	937	SB	4468
10	A	Louise Hazel	Great Britain & N.I.	6.15	6.25	6.12	6.25	927		4561
11	B	Nataliya Dobrynska	Ukraine	6.18	6.10	6.10	6.18	905		4773
12	B	Lilli Schwarzkopf	Germany	6.18	6.04	5.95	6.18	905	SB	4578
13	B	Jessica Zelinka	Canada	6.16	5.78	X	6.16	899	SB	4682
14	A	Antoinette Nana Djimou Ida	France	6.13	6.02	5.86	6.13	890		4627
15	B	Francesca Doveri	Italy	6.09	X	5.82	6.09	877		4294
16	A	Remona Fransen	Netherlands	6.06	X	X	6.06	868		4529
17	B	Jessica Samuelsson	Sweden	6.01	6.05	X	6.05	865		4464
18	A	Austra Skujytė	Lithuania	X	6.05	5.85	6.05	865		4673
19	B	Lyudmyla Yosypenko	Ukraine	6.03	5.97	5.87	6.03	859		4637
20	A	Julia Mächtig	Germany	5.98	5.92	X	5.98	843		4493
21	B	Alina Fyodorova	Ukraine	5.98	5.44	5.63	5.98	843	PB	4452
22	B	Kateřina Cachová	Czech Republic	5.65	5.49	5.97	5.97	840		4277
23	B	Ida Marcussen	Norway	5.70	X	5.88	5.88	813		4199
24	B	Margaret Simpson	Ghana	4.70	X	5.88	5.88	813		4410
25	B	Sharon Day	United States	5.64	X	5.87	5.87	810		4510
26	B	Györgyi Farkas	Hungary	5.58	5.78	5.58	5.78	783		4173

=== Javelin throw ===
Rank	Group	Name	Nationality	#1	#2	#3	Result	Points	Notes	Overall
1	A	Antoinette Nana Djimou Ida	France	55.79	50.77	54.17	55.79	973	PB	5600
2	A	Margaret Simpson	Ghana	53.13	52.53	51.37	53.13	921		5331
3	A	Tatyana Chernova	Russia	46.63	52.95	X	52.95	917	SB	5887
4	A	Jennifer Oeser	Germany	51.30	–	–	51.30	885	PB	5613
5	A	Lilli Schwarzkopf	Germany	49.69	47.81	43.97	49.69	854		5432
6	A	Austra Skujytė	Lithuania	49.19	47.57	48.90	49.19	844	SB	5517
7	A	Nataliya Dobrynska	Ukraine	48.00	X	46.74	48.00	821	SB	5594
8	A	Ruky Abdulai	Canada	44.48	45.67	46.35	46.35	790		5323
9	A	Aiga Grabuste	Latvia	43.46	44.71	45.82	45.82	779		5334
10	A	Ida Marcussen	Norway	44.90	X	40.38	44.90	762		4961
11	B	Kateřina Cachová	Czech Republic	43.89	36.66	43.98	43.98	744		5021
12	A	Julia Mächtig	Germany	43.74	42.26	42.31	43.74	739		5232
13	B	Hyleas Fountain	United States	42.09	42.85	43.42	43.42	733	SB	5611
14	A	Lyudmyla Yosypenko	Ukraine	42.94	X	42.49	42.94	724		5361
15	A	Grit Šadeiko	Estonia	41.23	42.84	X	42.84	722		5190
16	A	Györgyi Farkas	Hungary	41.66	42.15	X	42.15	709		4882
17	B	Louise Hazel	Great Britain & N.I.	40.53	41.75	39.37	41.75	701		5262
18	B	Anna Bogdanova	Russia	41.38	37.87	39.93	41.38	694	PB	5396
19	B	Karolina Tymińska	Poland	39.87	X	41.32	41.32	693	PB	5508
20	B	Jessica Samuelsson	Sweden	41.32	38.12	X	41.32	693	PB	5157
21	B	Jessica Ennis	Great Britain & N.I.	38.17	39.95	39.14	39.95	666		5754
22	B	Jessica Zelinka	Canada	35.31	39.59	37.85	39.59	659		5341
23	B	Sharon Day	United States	39.14	38.41	35.88	39.14	651		5161
24	B	Remona Fransen	Netherlands	38.03	37.66	33.38	38.03	630		5159
25	B	Alina Fyodorova	Ukraine	34.22	33.84	37.13	37.13	612	PB	5064
26	B	Francesca Doveri	Italy	35.09	33.55	X	35.09	573	SB	4867

=== 800 metres ===
Rank	Heat	Name	Nationality	Time	Points	Notes
1	3	Karolina Tymińska	Poland	2:05.21	1036	PB
2	3	Jessica Ennis	Great Britain & N.I.	2:07.81	997	PB
3	3	Tatyana Chernova	Russia	2:08.04	993	SB
4	1	Jessica Samuelsson	Sweden	2:10.20	962	SB
5	3	Jennifer Oeser	Germany	2:10.39	959	PB
6	1	Ida Marcussen	Norway	2:11.01	950	PB
7	3	Nataliya Dobrynska	Ukraine	2:11.34	945	PB
8	2	Jessica Zelinka	Canada	2:12.62	927	
9	1	Francesca Doveri	Italy	2:13.14	919	
10	1	Györgyi Farkas	Hungary	2:14.33	902	SB
11	2	Lyudmyla Yosypenko	Ukraine	2:14.37	902	
12	2	Aiga Grabuste	Latvia	2:14.82	895	
13	2	Lilli Schwarzkopf	Germany	2:15.26	889	
14	2	Ruky Abdulai	Canada	2:15.29	889	PB
15	1	Kateřina Cachová	Czech Republic	2:15.43	887	
16	2	Louise Hazel	Great Britain & N.I.	2:15.44	887	
17	1	Sharon Day	United States	2:15.74	882	SB
18	1	Remona Fransen	Netherlands	2:16.80	868	
19	2	Julia Mächtig	Germany	2:17.14	863	
20	2	Margaret Simpson	Ghana	2:17.91	852	
21	2	Anna Bogdanova	Russia	2:18.34	846	
22	1	Alina Fyodorova	Ukraine	2:18.51	844	
23	3	Austra Skujytė	Lithuania	2:23.21	780	
24	3	Antoinette Nana Djimou Ida	France	2:28.74	709	
	1	Grit Šadeiko	Estonia	DNF	0	
	3	Hyleas Fountain	United States	DNF	0	

=== Final standings ===
Rank	Athlete	Country	Points	Notes
1st place, gold medalist(s)	Jessica Ennis	Great Britain & N.I.	6751	
2nd place, silver medalist(s)	Jennifer Oeser	Germany	6572	
3rd place, bronze medalist(s)	Karolina Tymińska	Poland	6544	PB
5	Nataliya Dobrynska	Ukraine	6539	SB
6	Lilli Schwarzkopf	Germany	6321	
7	Antoinette Nana Djimou Ida	France	6309	
8	Austra Skujytė	Lithuania	6297	
9	Jessica Zelinka	Canada	6268	
10	Lyudmyla Yosypenko	Ukraine	6263	
11	Anna Bogdanova	Russia	6242	SB
12	Aiga Grabuste	Latvia	6229	
13	Ruky Abdulai	Canada	6212	PB
14	Margaret Simpson	Ghana	6183	
15	Louise Hazel	Great Britain & N.I.	6149	
16	Jessica Samuelsson	Sweden	6119	
17	Julia Mächtig	Germany	6095	
18	Sharon Day	United States	6043	
19	Remona Fransen	Netherlands	6027	
20	Ida Marcussen	Norway	5911	
21	Kateřina Cachová	Czech Republic	5908	
21	Alina Fyodorova	Ukraine	5908	
23	Francesca Doveri	Italy	5786	
24	Györgyi Farkas	Hungary	5784	
25	Hyleas Fountain	United States	5611	
26	Grit Šadeiko	Estonia	5190	
	Sara Aerts	Belgium	DNF	
	Wassana Winatho	Thailand	DNF	
DSQ	Tatyana Chernova	Russia	~~6880~~	WL
