= Hungary at the 2011 World Championships in Athletics =

- WA code: HUN
- National federation: Magyar Atlétikai Szovetség
- Website: www.masz.hu

in Daegu
- Competitors: 12
- Medals: Gold 0 Silver 1 Bronze 0 Total 1

World Championships in Athletics appearances
- 1976; 1980; 1983; 1987; 1991; 1993; 1995; 1997; 1999; 2001; 2003; 2005; 2007; 2009; 2011; 2013; 2015; 2017; 2019; 2022; 2023

Hungary competed at the 2011 World Championships in Athletics from August 27 to September 4 in Daegu, South Korea.

== Team selection ==
A team of 14 athletes was announced to represent the country in the event. The team will be led by Hammer thrower Krisztián Pars and discus thrower Zoltán Kővágó.

The following athletes appeared on the preliminary Entry List, but not on the Official Start List of the specific event, resulting in a total number of 12 competitors:

KEY:	Did not participate	Competed in another event

	Event	Athlete
Men	110 m hurdles	Dániel Kiss
Men	3000 metres steeplechase	Albert Minczér

== Medalists ==
The following competitor from Hungary won a medal at the Championships

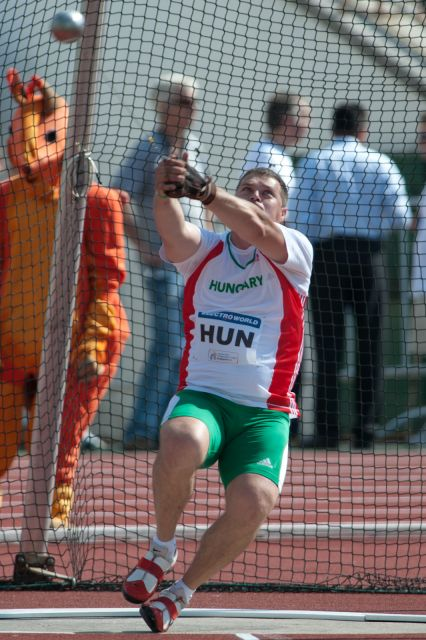
Krisztián Pars won a silver medal in the Men's Hammer Throw event at this year's championships (foto archived from Budapest 2010)

Medal	Athlete	Event
Silver	Krisztián Pars	Hammer throw

== Results ==
=== Men ===
Athlete	Event	Preliminaries		Heats		Semifinals		Final	
Athlete	Event	Time Width Height	Rank	Time Width Height	Rank	Time Width Height	Rank	Time Width Height	Rank
Tamás Kazi	800 metres			1:48.29	31 Q	1:46.53	16	Did not advance	
Balázs Baji	110 m hurdles			14.08	30	Did not advance			
Lajos Kürthy	Shot put	20.02	14					did not advance	
Róbert Fazekas	Discus throw	NM						Did not advance	
Zoltán Kővágó	Discus throw	62.16m	15					Did not advance	
Krisztián Pars	Hammer throw	77.21m	4 Q					81.18m	2
Kristóf Németh	Hammer throw	74.09m	16					Did not advance	

=== Women ===
Athlete	Event	Preliminaries		Heats		Semifinals		Final	
Athlete	Event	Time Width Height	Rank	Time Width Height	Rank	Time Width Height	Rank	Time Width Height	Rank
Krisztina Papp	10,000 metres							32:56.02	16
Viktória Madarász	20 kilometres walk							DQ	
Anita Márton	Shot put	17.04m	22					Did not advance	
Éva Orbán	Hammer throw	68.89m	13					Did not advance	

Heptathlon

Györgyi Farkas	Heptathlon			
Györgyi Farkas	Event	Results	Points	Rank
	100 m hurdles	14.32	934	28
	High jump	1.80m	978	16
	Shot put	12.75m	711	19
	200 m	26.35	767	26
	Long jump	5.78m	783	26
	Javelin throw	42.15m	709	16
	800 m	2:14.33	902	10
Total			5784	24
