= Sweden at the 2011 World Championships in Athletics =

- WA code: SWE
- National federation: Svenska Friidrottsförbundet
- Website: www.friidrott.se

in Daegu
- Competitors: 16
- Medals: Gold 0 Silver 0 Bronze 0 Total 0

World Championships in Athletics appearances (overview)
- 1976; 1980; 1983; 1987; 1991; 1993; 1995; 1997; 1999; 2001; 2003; 2005; 2007; 2009; 2011; 2013; 2015; 2017; 2019; 2022; 2023; 2025

Sweden competed at the 2011 World Championships in Athletics from August 27 to September 4 in Daegu, South Korea.

== Team selection ==
A team of 16 athletes was announced to represent the country in the event. The most prominent members of the squad are Olympic gold medalists triple jumper Christian Olsson and heptathlete Carolina Klüft, who starts in this year's long jump competition. The team includes one athlete invited by the IPC for exhibition events: Gunilla Wallengren, 800m T54 (wheelchair) women.

== Results ==
=== Men ===
| Athlete | Event | Preliminaries | | Heats | | Semifinals | | Final | |
| Athlete | Event | Time Width Height | Rank | Time Width Height | Rank | Time Width Height | Rank | Time Width Height | Rank |
|---|---|---|---|---|---|---|---|---|---|
| Ato Ibáñez | 20 kilometres walk | | | | | | | DSQ | |
| Andreas Gustafsson | 50 kilometres walk | | | | | | | 4:00:05 SB | 26 |
| Michel Tornéus | Long jump | 7.65 | 27 | | | | | Did not advance | |
| Christian Olsson | Triple jump | 17.16 | 5 Q | | | | | 17.23 | 6 |
| Alhaji Jeng | Pole vault | 5.50 | 17 | | | | | did not advance | |
| Niklas Arrhenius | Discus throw | 60.57 | 28 | | | | | Did not advance | |
| Leif Arrhenius | Discus throw | 61.33 | 22 | | | | | Did not advance | |
| Mattias Jons | Hammer throw | 67.93 | 32 | | | | | did not advance | |
| Gabriel Wallin | Javelin throw | 74.44 | 26 | | | | | Did not advance | |

=== Women ===
| Athlete | Event | Preliminaries | | Heats | | Semifinals | | Final | |
| Athlete | Event | Time Width Height | Rank | Time Width Height | Rank | Time Width Height | Rank | Time Width Height | Rank |
|---|---|---|---|---|---|---|---|---|---|
| Moa Hjelmer | 200 metres | | | 23.31 | 24 | Did not advance | | | |
| Moa Hjelmer | 400 metres | | | 52.26 | 17 Q | 52.35 | 18 | did not advance | |
| Isabellah Andersson | Marathon | | | | | | | 2:30:13 | 7 |
| Carolina Klüft | Long jump | 6.60 | 8 q | | | | | 6.56 | 5 |
| Ebba Jungmark | High jump | 1.92 | 17 | | | | | Did not advance | |
| Emma Green Tregaro | High jump | 1.95 SB | 5 Q | | | | | 1.89 | 11 |
| Malin Dahlström | Pole vault | 4.25 | 25 | | | | | did not advance | |

Heptathlon

| Jessica Samuelsson | Heptathlon | | | |
| Jessica Samuelsson | Event | Results | Points | Rank |
|---|---|---|---|---|
| | 100 m hurdles | 13.77 PB | 1011 | 23 |
| | High jump | 1.68 | 830 | 26 |
| | Shot put | 14.52 | 829 | 8 |
| | 200 m | 24.55 | 929 | 10 |
| | Long jump | 6.05 | 865 | 17 |
| | Javelin throw | 41.32 PB | 693 | 20 |
| | 800 m | 2:10.20 SB | 962 | 4 |
| Total | | | 6119 | 16 |
