= 2011 World Championships in Athletics – Men's triple jump =

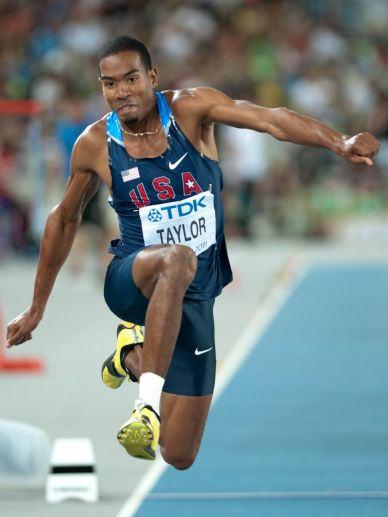
American Christian Taylor beat the defending champion Phillips Idowu.

Official Video

The Men's triple jump event at the 2011 World Championships in Athletics was held at the Daegu Stadium on September 2 and 4.

Seven made the automatic qualifying mark. The eventual winner was not one of them, barely qualifying with the 9th best mark.

Favorite Phillips Idowu led through the first three rounds as Will Claye failed to make a legal jump through the first two rounds, waited until his third jump to jump 17.50, to not only qualify for his final three jumps but to move into second place. In the fourth round, unheralded American collegian Christian Taylor popped 17.96, the number ten all time jump to blast into the lead. Idowu jumped 17.77 in his fourth attempt but was unable to improve upon that.

== Medalists ==
Gold	Silver	Bronze
Christian Taylor; United States	Phillips Idowu; Great Britain & N.I.	Will Claye; United States

== Records ==
Prior to the competition, the established records were as follows.

World record	Jonathan Edwards (GBR)	18.29	Gothenburg, Sweden	7 August 1995
Championship record	Jonathan Edwards (GBR)	18.29	Gothenburg, Sweden	7 August 1995
World leading	Teddy Tamgho (FRA)	17.91	Lausanne, Switzerland	30 June 2011
African record	Tarik Bouguetaïb (MAR)	17.37	Khemisset, Morocco	14 July 2007
Asian record	Li Yanxi (CHN)	17.59	Jinan, China	26 October 2009
North, Central American and Caribbean record	Kenny Harrison (USA)	18.09	Atlanta, United States	27 July 1996
South American record	Jadel Gregório (BRA)	17.90	Belém, Brazil	20 May 2007
European record	Jonathan Edwards (GBR)	18.29	Gothenburg, Sweden	7 August 1995
Oceanian record	Ken Lorraway (AUS)	17.46	London, United Kingdom	7 August 1982

== Qualification standards ==
A standard	B standard
17.10	16.85

== Schedule ==
Date	Time	Round
September 2, 2011	10:30	Qualification
September 4, 2011	19:05	Final

== Results ==
=== Qualification ===
Qualification: Qualifying Performance 17.10 (Q) or at least 12 best performers (q) advance to the final.

Rank	Group	Athlete	Nationality	#1	#2	#3	Result	Notes
1	B	Alexis Copello	Cuba	17.06	17.31		17.31	Q
2	B	Nelson Évora	Portugal	17.05	17.20		17.20	Q
3	A	Will Claye	United States	x	17.19		17.19	Q
4	A	Phillips Idowu	Great Britain & N.I.	17.17			17.17	Q
5	B	Christian Olsson	Sweden	16.55	17.16		17.16	Q
6	A	Leevan Sands	Bahamas	17.13			17.13	Q, SB
7	A	Benjamin Compaoré	France	17.11			17.11	Q
8	B	Yoandri Betanzos	Cuba	17.01	13.66	-	17.01	q
9	A	Christian Taylor	United States	x	16.99	16.81	16.99	q
10	B	Fabrizio Donato	Italy	16.55	16.70	16.88	16.88	q
11	B	Henry Frayne	Australia	16.54	16.83	16.64	16.83	q
12	A	Şeref Osmanoğlu	Ukraine	16.81	x	16.73	16.81	q
13	A	Arnie David Giralt	Cuba	16.74	16.68	16.17	16.74	
14	A	Fabrizio Schembri	Italy	16.71	16.28	16.63	16.71	
15	B	Marian Oprea	Romania	x	16.61	16.19	16.61	
16	B	Tosin Oke	Nigeria	x	16.50	16.60	16.60	
17	B	Jefferson Sabino	Brazil	16.18	15.91	16.51	16.51	
18	A	Aleksey Fyodorov	Russia	15.84	16.42	16.26	16.42	
19	A	Samyr Lainé	Haiti	16.38	15.83	16.30	16.38	
20	A	Li Yanxi	China	15.68	16.28	15.42	16.28	
21	B	Hugo Mamba-Schlick	Cameroon	15.66	15.93	16.15	16.15	
22	B	Anders Møller	Denmark	16.14	14.07	x	16.14	
23	B	Walter Davis	United States	15.28	13.90	16.12	16.12	
24	A	Wilbert Walker	Jamaica	15.66	14.50	15.97	15.97	
25	B	Yevhen Semenenko	Ukraine	x	15.72	15.96	15.96	
26	B	Maximiliano Díaz	Argentina	15.91	15.65	x	15.91	
	A	Sief El Islem Temacini	Algeria	x	x	x	NM	
	A	Renjith Maheshwary	India	x	x	x	NM	
	A	Kim Deok-hyeon	South Korea	x	x	x	NM	
	A	Tumelo Thagane	South Africa	x	x	x	NM	
	B	Yevgeniy Ektov	Kazakhstan	x	x	x	NM	

=== Final ===
Rank	Athlete	Nationality	#1	#2	#3	#4	#5	#6	Result	Notes
1st place, gold medalist(s)	Christian Taylor	United States	x	17.04	17.40	17.96	–	15.64	17.96	WL, PB
2nd place, silver medalist(s)	Phillips Idowu	Great Britain & N.I.	17.56	17.38	17.70	17.77	17.48	17.49	17.77	SB
3rd place, bronze medalist(s)	Will Claye	United States	x	x	17.50	17.30	–	17.14	17.50	PB
4	Alexis Copello	Cuba	x	17.19	x	17.36	17.47	16.11	17.47	
5	Nelson Évora	Portugal	17.35	16.80	16.63	16.18	16.57	16.95	17.35	SB
6	Christian Olsson	Sweden	17.23	16.80	17.22	16.75	–	–	17.23	
7	Leevan Sands	Bahamas	16.81	x	17.07	17.12	17.21	16.59	17.21	
8	Benjamin Compaoré	France	x	17.04	17.17	x	16.99	x	17.17	
9	Henry Frayne	Australia	16.45	16.78	16.60				16.78	
10	Fabrizio Donato	Italy	16.77	x	x				16.77	
11	Yoandri Betanzos	Cuba	14.93	16.22	16.67				16.67	
12	Şeref Osmanoğlu	Ukraine	16.29	x	16.38				16.38	
