= 2011 World Championships in Athletics – Men's 110 metres hurdles =

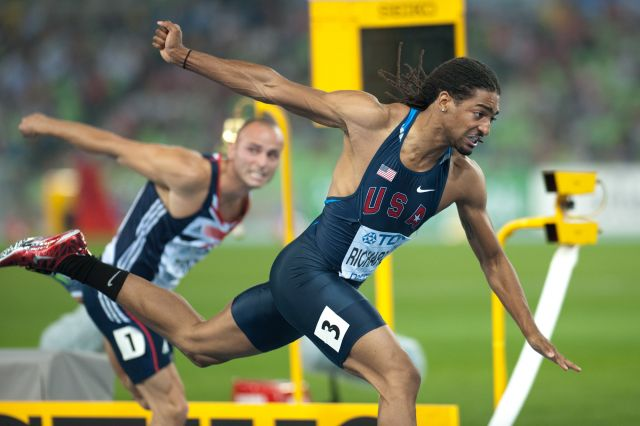
Jason Richardson winning the 110m hurdles. In background Andy Turner.

The Men's 110 metres hurdles at the 2011 World Championships in Athletics was held at the Daegu Stadium on August 28 and 29.

== Summary ==
The final featured the three fastest 110 hurdlers in history. World Record Holder Dayron Robles took an early lead but was being passed by former record holder Liu Xiang. Between the last two hurdles, Robles' right arm backswing caught Liu's oncoming left arm. Liu hit the tenth hurdle, with a second arm collision with Robles, slowing Liu enough to finish in third. Robles crossed the finish line first, but after the race, the Chinese team protested and Robles was disqualified under IAAF Rule 163.2 for obstruction, giving the championship to second finisher Jason Richardson. Andy Turner was separated from David Oliver in a photo finish for the bronze medal, both receiving the same time. 5th place in the race was also so close the photo could not separate the two competitors.

== Medalists ==
Gold	Silver	Bronze
Jason Richardson; United States	Liu Xiang; China	Andy Turner; Great Britain & N.I.

== Records ==
World record	Dayron Robles (CUB)	12.87	Ostrava, Czech Republic	June 12, 2008
Championship record	Colin Jackson (GBR)	12.91	Stuttgart, Germany	August 20, 1993
World leading	David Oliver (USA)	12.94	Eugene, United States	June 4, 2011
African record	Shaun Bownes (RSA)	13.26	Heusden, Netherlands	July 14, 2001
Asian record	Liu Xiang (CHN)	12.88	Lausanne, Switzerland	July 11, 2006
North, Central American and Caribbean record	Dayron Robles (CUB)	12.87	Ostrava, Czech Republic	June 12, 2008
South American record	Redelén dos Santos (BRA)	13.29	Lisbon, Portugal	June 13, 2004
European record	Colin Jackson (GBR)	12.91	Stuttgart, Germany	August 20, 1993
Oceanian record	Kyle Vander Kuyp (AUS)	13.29	Gothenburg, Sweden	August 11, 1995

== Qualification standards ==
A time	B time
13.52	13.60

== Schedule ==
Date	Time	Round
August 28, 2011	09:50	Heats
August 29, 2011	19:00	Semifinals
August 29, 2011	21:25	Final

== Results ==
KEY:	q	Fastest non-qualifiers	Q	Qualified	NR	National record	PB	Personal best	SB	Seasonal best

=== Heats ===
Qualification: First 3 in each heat (Q) and the next 4 fastest (q) advance to the semifinals.

Wind:
Heat 1: +1.0 m/s, Heat 2: −0.2 m/s, Heat 3: +1.4 m/s, Heat 4: −0.3 m/s

Rank	Heat	Name	Nationality	Time	Notes
1	2	Jason Richardson	United States	13.19	Q
2	1	Liu Xiang	China	13.20	Q
3	3	David Oliver	United States	13.27	Q
4	2	Dwight Thomas	Jamaica	13.31	Q
5	1	Andy Turner	Great Britain & N.I.	13.32	Q
6	4	Aries Merritt	United States	13.36	Q
7	4	Dayron Robles	Cuba	13.42	Q
8	3	Jiang Fan	China	13.47	Q, PB
8	3	Andrew Riley	Jamaica	13.47	Q
10	3	Dimitri Bascou	France	13.51	q
11	3	William Sharman	Great Britain & N.I.	13.52	q
12	1	Willi Mathiszik	Germany	13.53	Q
12	1	Richard Phillips	Jamaica	13.53	q
14	2	Ronald Forbes	Cayman Islands	13.54	Q
15	4	Paulo Villar	Colombia	13.55	Q
15	4	Shi Dongpeng	China	13.55	Q
17	4	Erik Balnuweit	Germany	13.56	
18	1	Ryan Brathwaite	Barbados	13.57	
19	2	Konstadinos Douvalidis	Greece	13.59	
20	3	Héctor Cotto	Puerto Rico	13.60	
21	4	Emanuele Abate	Italy	13.63	
21	4	Othmane Hadj Lazib	Algeria	13.63	
23	2	Lawrence Clarke	Great Britain & N.I.	13.65	
24	2	Alexander John	Germany	13.68	
25	1	Sergey Shubenkov	Russia	13.70	
26	4	Park Tae-Kyong	South Korea	13.83	
27	3	Lehann Fourie	South Africa	13.86	
28	1	Andreas Kundert	Switzerland	13.87	
29	2	Dominik Bochenek	Poland	13.96	
30	2	Balázs Baji	Hungary	14.06	
31	1	Ahmad Hazer	Lebanon	14.42	
32	3	Kim Fai Iong	Macau	15.35	

=== Semifinals ===
Qualification: First 3 in each heat (Q) and the next 2 fastest (q) advance to the final.

Wind:
Heat 1: −1.4 m/s, Heat 2: −1.6 m/s

Rank	Heat	Name	Nationality	Time	Notes
1	2	Jason Richardson	United States	13.11	Q
2	1	Liu Xiang	China	13.31	Q
3	1	Dayron Robles	Cuba	13.32	Q
4	1	Aries Merritt	United States	13.32	Q
5	2	David Oliver	United States	13.40	Q
6	1	Andy Turner	Great Britain & N.I.	13.44	q
7	2	William Sharman	Great Britain & N.I.	13.51	Q
8	2	Dwight Thomas	Jamaica	13.56	q
9	2	Shi Dongpeng	China	13.57	
10	1	Dimitri Bascou	France	13.62	
11	2	Ronald Forbes	Cayman Islands	13.67	
12	2	Jiang Fan	China	13.71	
13	1	Paulo Villar	Colombia	13.73	
14	2	Andrew Riley	Jamaica	13.75	
15	1	Richard Phillips	Jamaica	13.76	
16	1	Willi Mathiszik	Germany	13.81	

=== Final ===
Wind: −1.1 m/s

Rank	Lane	Name	Nationality	Time	Notes
1st place, gold medalist(s)	3	Jason Richardson	United States	13.16	
2nd place, silver medalist(s)	6	Liu Xiang	China	13.27	
3rd place, bronze medalist(s)	1	Andy Turner	Great Britain & N.I.	13.44	13.432
4	4	David Oliver	United States	13.44	13.440
5	7	Aries Merritt	United States	13.67	
5	2	William Sharman	Great Britain & N.I.	13.67	
	8	Dwight Thomas	Jamaica	DNF	
	5	Dayron Robles	Cuba	13.14	DSQ
