= 2011 World Championships in Athletics – Women's long jump =

Official Video

The women's long jump event at the 2011 World Championships in Athletics was held at the Daegu Stadium on August 27 and 28.

Reigning world champion Brittney Reese was the pre-event favourite as she held the best mark that year (7.19 m) and led on the Diamond League circuit. Russia's Darya Klishina and Olga Zaytseva were the only ones to have cleared seven metres that season, while Americans Funmi Jimoh and Janay DeLoach were the only jumpers to have defeated Reese on the circuit. Veronika Shutkova and Maurren Maggi (the 2008 Olympic gold medallist) were other highly ranked entrants.

Maggi produced the best jump of the qualifying rounds, followed by Belarusian Nastassia Mironchyk-Ivanova. Brittney Reese needed the last of her three jumps to achieve the qualifying mark. Zaytseva was the most prominent jumper to be eliminated at the first stage. Maggi, Jimoh and Naide Gomes were high-profile eliminations in the first half of the final round. Reese took the lead with her first jump of 6.82 m and, despite having had five no-jumps, she remained in first place to take the gold. It was Olga Kucherenko, Ineta Radēviča and Nastassia Mironchyk-Ivanova who fought for the minor medals. Mironchyk-Ivanova jumped 6.74 m in round three, only to be overtaken by Kucherenko (6.77 m) the following round. Radēviča produced her best (6.76 m) with her final jump to edge into the bronze medal position.

Reese's mark of 6.82 m was the shortest winning distance in the history of the event at the World Championships. Nevertheless, she became only the second woman to ever win two consecutive long jump world titles, matching the feat of her fellow American Jackie Joyner-Kersee. Kucherenko and Radēviča gained their first ever medals on the world stage, although both had been medallists at the 2010 European Athletics Championships.

Mironchyk-Ivanova was fourth. She had a jump which seemed to be the longest of all, about 6.90 m. Her ponytail swang and left the mark behind at 6.74 m and she lost the win and all the other medals as a result.

A retest of silver medallist Kucherenko's sample in 2016 came back positive for doping and she was stripped of her medal. As a result Radēviča was promoted to silver medal and Mironchyk-Ivanova moved into the medals with a bronze.

== Medalists ==
Revised

Gold	Silver	Bronze
Brittney Reese; United States	Ineta Radēviča; Latvia	Nastassia Mironchyk-Ivanova; Belarus

Original

Gold	Silver	Bronze
Brittney Reese; United States	Olga Kucherenko; Russia	Ineta Radēviča; Latvia

== Records ==
Prior to the competition, the established records were as follows.

World record	Galina Chistyakova (URS)	7.51	Leningrad, Soviet Union	11 June 1988
Championship record	Jackie Joyner-Kersee (USA)	7.36	Rome, Italy	3 September 1987
World leading	Brittney Reese (USA)	7.19	Eugene, OR, United States	26 June 2011
African record	Chioma Ajunwa (NGR)	7.12	Atlanta, GA, United States	2 August 1996
Asian record	Weili Yao (CHN)	7.01	Jinan, China	5 June 1993
North, Central American and Caribbean record	Jackie Joyner-Kersee (USA)	7.49	New York, NY, United States	22 May 1994
North, Central American and Caribbean record	Jackie Joyner-Kersee (USA)	7.49	Sestriere, Italy	31 July 1994
South American record	Maurren Higa Maggi (BRA)	7.26	Bogotá, Colombia	26 June 1999
European record	Galina Chistyakova (URS)	7.51	Leningrad, Soviet Union	11 June 1988
Oceanian record	Bronwyn Thompson (AUS)	7.00	Melbourne, Australia	7 March 2002

== Qualification standards ==
A standard	B standard
6.75	6.65

== Schedule ==
Date	Time	Round
August 27, 2011	21:15	Qualification
August 28, 2011	18:15	Final

== Results ==
=== Qualification ===
Qualification: Qualifying Performance 6.75 (Q) or at least 12 best performers (q) advance to the final.

Rank	Group	Athlete	Nationality	#1	#2	#3	Result	Notes
1	B	Maurren Higa Maggi	Brazil	6.55	6.86		6.86	Q
2	B	Nastassia Mironchyk-Ivanova	Belarus	6.80			6.80	Q
3	A	Brittney Reese	United States	6.41	x	6.79	6.79	Q
4	B	Darya Klishina	Russia	6.77			6.77	Q
5	A	Naide Gomes	Portugal	6.76			6.76	Q
6	B	Funmi Jimoh	United States	6.68	x	6.26	6.68	q
7	A	Olga Kucherenko	Russia	6.37	6.67	x	6.67	q
8	A	Carolina Klüft	Sweden	6.60	x	6.40	6.60	q
9	B	Ineta Radēviča	Latvia	x	6.59	x	6.59	q
10	B	Mayookha Johny	India	6.52	x	6.53	6.53	q
11	B	Karin Mey Melis	Turkey	x	x	6.52	6.52	q
12	A	Janay DeLoach	United States	x	6.29	6.51	6.51	q
13	B	Olga Zaytseva	Russia	6.50	x	x	6.50	
14	A	Bianca Kappler	Germany	6.48	6.48	6.32	6.48	
15	A	Viktoriya Rybalko	Ukraine	6.45	x	6.40	6.45	
16	A	Veronika Shutkova	Belarus	6.45	x	6.29	6.45	
17	A	Bianca Stuart	Bahamas	x	3.96	6.44	6.44	
18	B	Blessing Okagbare	Nigeria	x	6.36	6.27	6.36	
19	B	Irene Pusterla	Switzerland	6.34	6.22	6.21	6.34	
20	B	Shara Proctor	Great Britain & N.I.	x	x	6.34	6.34	
21	A	Marestella Torres	Philippines	6.31	6.19	6.22	6.31	
22	A	Teresa Dobija	Poland	x	x	6.30	6.30	
23	A	Lauma Griva	Latvia	6.27	6.16	6.10	6.27	
24	A	Keila Costa	Brazil	6.09	6.07	6.26	6.26	
25	A	Yuliya Tarasova	Uzbekistan	x	6.26	x	6.26	
26	B	Éloyse Lesueur	France	x	x	6.22	6.22	
27	B	Nina Kolarič	Slovenia	x	6.19	6.15	6.19	
28	A	Jovanee Jarrett	Jamaica	6.19	x	5.75	6.19	
29	B	Jung Soon-Ok	South Korea	x	x	6.18	6.18	SB
30	B	Chantel Malone	British Virgin Islands	5.96	6.12	x	6.12	
31	B	Sostene Moguenara	Germany	x	x	6.02	6.02	
32	A	Ola Sesay	Sierra Leone	5.64	5.94	5.43	5.94	
33	B	Tori Polk	United States	x	5.66	x	5.66	
34	A	Enas Gharib	Egypt	5.35	5.48	5.44	5.48	SB
—N/a	B	Concepción Montaner	Spain	x	x	x	NM	
—N/a	A	Ivana Španović	Serbia				DNS	

=== Final ===
Format: Each athlete has three attempts, then the eight best performers have three further attempts

Rank	Athlete	Nationality	#1	#2	#3	#4	#5	#6	Result	Notes
1st place, gold medalist(s)	Brittney Reese	United States	6.82	x	x	x	x	x	6.82	
2nd place, silver medalist(s)	Ineta Radēviča	Latvia	6.61	6.63	6.66	6.61	x	6.76	6.76	SB
3rd place, bronze medalist(s)	Nastassia Mironchyk-Ivanova	Belarus	x	6.71	6.74	x	x	x	6.74	
4	Carolina Klüft	Sweden	x	6.44	6.56	x	6.37	x	6.56	
5	Janay DeLoach	United States	6.32	6.39	x	x	6.32	6.56	6.56	
6	Darya Klishina	Russia	6.39	6.30	6.49	x	6.50	6.33	6.50	
7	Karin Mey Melis	Turkey	x	6.44	x	x	6.44	6.19	6.44	
8	Mayookha Johny	India	6.37	6.31	6.26				6.37	
10	Naide Gomes	Portugal	x	6.16	6.26				6.26	
11	Maurren Higa Maggi	Brazil	x	x	6.17				6.17	
—N/a	Funmi Jimoh	United States	x	x	x				NM	
—N/a	Olga Kucherenko	Russia	6.48	6.56	6.65	6.77	x	x	DQ	
