= 2011 World Championships in Athletics – Men's shot put =

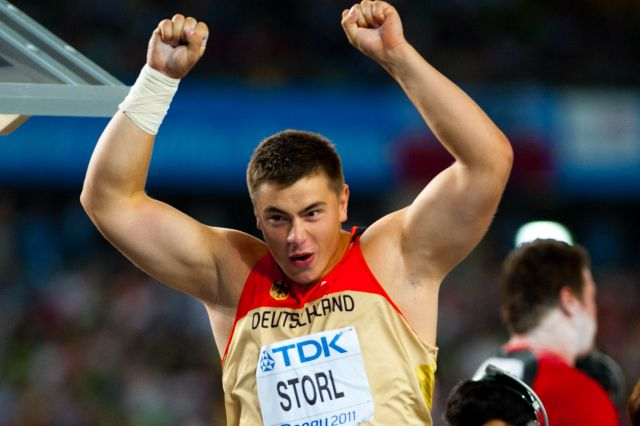
David Storl celebrating the announcement of his winning put at Daegu

Official Video

The Men's shot put event at the 2011 World Championships in Athletics was held at the Daegu Stadium on September 1 and 2.

David Storl made a major improvement to achieve a new personal best of 21.50, leading the qualifying round by 45 cm (a foot and a half).

2007 Champion, Reese Hoffa, took the early lead and held it until Storl threw a new personal best of 21.60 in the second round. Andrei Mikhnevich put a 21.40 in the third round to get close to Storl. In the fourth round, world leader, Dylan Armstrong, took the lead with a 21.64, which held up as the leader until the final throw of the competition, when Storl threw a third personal best of 21.78 to win.

In 2013, it was revealed that Andrei Mikhnevich tested positive for a prohibited substance at the 2005 World Championships. Since this was his second offense, he was given a lifetime ban and all his results from August 2005 and on were annulled.

== Medalists ==
Gold	Silver	Bronze
David Storl; Germany	Dylan Armstrong; Canada	Christian Cantwell; United States

== Records ==
Prior to the competition, the established records were as follows.

World record	Randy Barnes (USA)	23.12	Westwood, United States	20 May 1990
Championship record	Werner Günthör (SUI)	22.23	Rome, Italy	29 August 1987
World Leading	Dylan Armstrong (CAN)	22.21	Calgary, Canada	25 June 2011
African record	Janus Robberts (RSA)	21.97	Eugene, United States	2 June 2001
Asian record	Sultan Al-Hebshi (KSA)	21.13	Doha, Qatar	8 May 2009
North, Central American and Caribbean record	Randy Barnes (USA)	23.12	Westwood, United States	20 May 1990
South American record	Marco Antonio Verni (CHI)	21.14	Santiago, Chile	29 July 2004
European record	Ulf Timmermann (GDR)	23.06	Chania, Greece	22 May 1988
Oceanian record	Scott Martin (AUS)	21.26	Melbourne, Australia	21 February 2008

== Qualification standards ==
A standard	B standard
20.50	20.00

== Schedule ==
Date	Time	Round
September 1, 2011	10:00	Qualification
September 2, 2011	19:00	Final

== Results ==
=== Qualification ===
Qualification: Qualifying Performance 20.60 (Q) or at least 12 best performers (q) advance to the final.

Rank	Group	Athlete	Nationality	#1	#2	#3	Result	Notes
1	A	David Storl	Germany	x	21.50		21.50	Q, PB
2	B	Dylan Armstrong	Canada	20.52	21.05		21.05	Q
3	B	Reese Hoffa	United States	20.96			20.96	Q
4	A	Ryan Whiting	United States	20.40	20.77		20.77	Q
5	B	Christian Cantwell	United States	20.55	20.73		20.73	Q
6	A	Tomasz Majewski	Poland	20.73			20.73	Q
7	A	Ralf Bartels	Germany	20.45	x	20.04	20.45	q
8	B	Marco Fortes	Portugal	19.83	20.32	20.02	20.32	q
9	B	Carlos Véliz	Cuba	20.24	19.79	x	20.24	q
10	A	Adam Nelson	United States	20.23	x	x	20.23	q
11	A	Asmir Kolašinac	Serbia	19.58	20.08	20.14	20.14	q
12	B	Marco Schmidt	Germany	20.06	19.96	x	20.06	
13	B	Lajos Kürthy	Hungary	19.92	19.76	20.02	20.02	
14	B	Maksim Sidorov	Russia	18.56	19.95	x	19.95	
15	B	Pavel Lyzhyn	Belarus	19.91	x	x	19.91	
16	A	Kim Christensen	Denmark	19.02	19.40	19.74	19.74	
17	B	Hamza Alić	Bosnia and Herzegovina	19.70	x	x	19.70	
18	B	Chang Ming-huang	Chinese Taipei	19.60	x	18.98	19.60	
19	A	Jan Marcell	Czech Republic	19.51	x	19.46	19.51	
20	A	Germán Lauro	Argentina	19.50	19.45	x	19.50	
21	A	Andriy Semenov	Ukraine	x	x	19.45	19.45	
22	A	Om Prakash Singh	India	19.29	19.06	x	19.29	
23	B	Amin Nikfar	Iran	18.69	18.95	19.18	19.18	
24	B	Milan Jotanović	Serbia	18.39	x	18.21	18.39	
25	A	Borja Vivas	Spain	18.37	x	18.22	18.37	
26	A	Hwang In-Sung	South Korea	17.75	17.62	x	17.75	
	A	~~Andrei Mikhnevich~~	~~Belarus~~	~~20.79~~			~~20.79~~	DQ

=== Final ===
Rank	Athlete	Nationality	#1	#2	#3	#4	#5	#6	Result	Notes
1st place, gold medalist(s)	David Storl	Germany	x	21.60	20.82	x	x	21.78	21.78	PB
2nd place, silver medalist(s)	Dylan Armstrong	Canada	20.79	20.58	20.82	21.64	21.40	x	21.64	
3rd place, bronze medalist(s)	Christian Cantwell	United States	20.50	20.73	20.83	x	21.36	x	21.36	
4	Reese Hoffa	United States	20.90	20.99	20.97	20.84	x	x	20.99	
5	Marco Fortes	Portugal	20.59	x	19.36	20.83	20.25	20.04	20.83	
6	Ryan Whiting	United States	x	20.48	20.66	20.75	x	x	20.75	
7	Adam Nelson	United States	20.29	20.14	19.73	x	20.02	x	20.29	
8	Tomasz Majewski	Poland	x	20.03	20.18				20.18	
9	Ralf Bartels	Germany	20.03	20.14	20.12				20.14	
10	Asmir Kolašinac	Serbia	19.84	x	19.77				19.84	
11	Carlos Véliz	Cuba	19.70	x	x				19.70	
	~~Andrei Mikhnevich~~	~~Belarus~~	~~20.45~~	~~20.49~~	~~21.40~~	~~20.72~~	~~20.64~~	~~21.37~~	~~21.40~~	DQ
