= Yerino =

Yerino Ерино
- Village
- Location within Vologda Oblast Location within Russia
- Coordinates: 59°58′N 39°14′E
- Country: Russia
- Region: Vologda Oblast
- District: Ust-Kubinsky District
- Time zone: UTC+3:00

Yerino (Russian: Ерино) is a rural locality (a village) in Bogorodskoye Rural Settlement, Ust-Kubinsky District, Vologda Oblast, Russia. The population was 20 as of 2002.

== Geography ==
The distance to Ustye is 52 km, to Bogorodskoye is 2 km. Sokolovo is the nearest rural locality.
