= Jason Richardson (hurdler) =

American hurdler (born 1986)

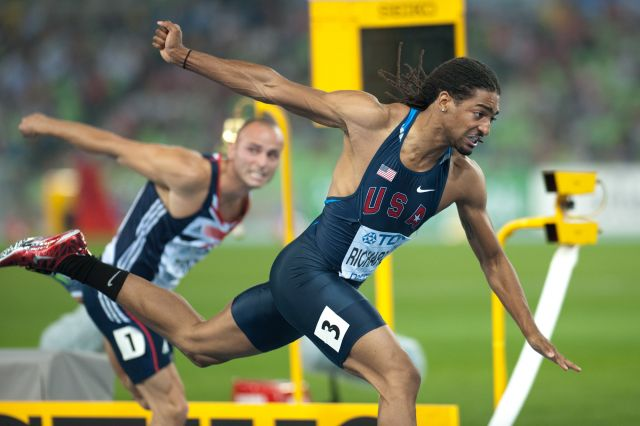
- Jason Richardson during 2011 World championships Athletics in Daegu

Personal information
- Nationality: United States
- Born: April 4, 1986 (age 40) Houston, Texas

Sport
- Sport: Running
- Event: 110 metre hurdles
- College team: South Carolina Gamecocks
Medal record
Men's athletics
Representing the United States
Olympic Games
Silver medal – second place	2012 London	110 m hurdles
World Championships
Gold medal – first place	2011 Daegu	110 m hurdles
World Youth Championships
Gold medal – first place	2003 Sherbrooke	110 m hurdles
Gold medal – first place	2003 Sherbrooke	400 m hurdles

Jason Richardson (born April 4, 1986) is an American track and field athlete who specializes in the 110 meter hurdles. He won the gold medal in the 110 meter hurdles at the 2011 World Championships in Daegu, and the silver medal in the same event at the 2012 Summer Olympics in London. His personal best for the event is 12.98 seconds, set in June 2012 at the U.S. Olympic Trials.

== Background ==
Growing up in Cedar Hill, Texas, a suburb of Dallas, he began taking part in sports at the age of 12. Despite having a talent for hurdling, his parents were initially hesitant in encouraging him to compete in track and field. For Richardson and his family, the focus was his education: having represented his school at a national level on their debate team, he saw the discipline more as a way of pursuing further academic study via a college scholarship. By the time he graduated from Cedar Hill High School, he had run the third fastest ever time in the 400 meter hurdles for a high school athlete.

== Career ==
In his first international outing at the 2003 World Youth Championships in Athletics, he completed a novel 110 m and 400 m hurdles double, taking both gold medals in personal record times. He became the first person to win a hurdles double at a major athletics championship and earned him that year's Youth Athlete of the Year award from USA Track and Field.

In 2005, he obtained a McKissick Scholarship and enrolled at the University of South Carolina to study sport and entertainment management. He began to focus more on short-sprint hurdling and ran for the South Carolina Gamecocks, taking NCAA bronze medals indoors and outdoors in his first year at the college. Injury affected his 2006 indoor season and he failed to finish at the NCAA Indoor Championship after falling at the second hurdle. He was runner-up in both hurdles competitions at the SEC Championships outdoors, and then went on to another third-place finish in the 110 m NCAA contest. He did not make the NCAA 400 m hurdles final, despite running a time of 49.82 seconds in the semi-finals. He closed the year with a silver medal over 110 m hurdles at the NACAC U-23 Championships.

Richardson focused on his studies in 2007 as an injury ruled him out of the track season. His final year at South Carolina (2008) proved to be his most successful. In the 60 meter hurdles indoors, he was runner-up at the Millrose Games, Tyson Invitational and the SEC Indoors. He was also the silver medalist at the NCAA Indoor Championship, where he ran a personal best of 7.53 seconds, but lost by a fraction of a second in a photo finish. In the outdoor season, he won the SEC Championship title in the 110 m hurdles and ran a personal best of 13.21 seconds to claim the NCAA Regional title. A win at the NCAA Outdoors brought him a SEC/NCAA Regional/NCAA hat-trick. He was named South Carolina's MVP both outdoors and indoors that year and he was also chosen at the USTFCCCA Scholar Athlete of the Year. Following a win at the NACAC Under-23 Championships in championship record time, he went on to compete at the United States Olympic Trials, although a hamstring injury in the qualifiers ruled out his selection chances.

He turned professional for the 2009 season and focused solely on the 110 m hurdles; his best run of the year (13.29 sec) came in Gainesville, Florida. He ran on the IAAF Diamond League circuit in Europe the next year, but came last in the 110 m hurdles final at the 2010 USA Outdoor Track and Field Championships. He twice ran a personal record time of 13.15 seconds at the 2011 USA Championships and was rewarded with third place behind David Oliver and Aries Merritt, gaining his first senior international selection in the process. During the 2011 IAAF Diamond League season, he won at the DN Galan and came second to Dayron Robles at the London Grand Prix with a personal record run of 13.08 seconds. He is coached by John Smith, who also trains Carmelita Jeter and previously coached Maurice Greene.

On August 29, 2011, Richardson ran 13.16 to win the 110 meter hurdles World Championship in Daegu, South Korea, after Robles (the initial winner) was disqualified for impeding Liu Xiang. On August 8, 2012, Richardson won the silver in the 110 meter hurdles at the 2012 Summer Olympics in London. In August 2013, Richardson finished 4th in 2013 World Championships in Athletics – Men's 110 metres hurdles.

== Achievements ==
Year	Competition	Venue	Position	Event	Notes
Representing United States
2003	World Youth Championships	Sherbrooke, Canada	1st	110 m hurdles (91.4 cm)	13.29
2003	World Youth Championships	Sherbrooke, Canada	1st	400 m hurdles (84.0 cm)	49.91
2006	NACAC U-23 Championships	Santo Domingo, Dominican Republic	2nd	110 m hurdles	13.87 (wind: +1.1 m/s)
2008	NACAC U-23 Championships	Toluca, Mexico	1st	110 m hurdles	13.32 (wind: -1.0 m/s) A
2011	World Championships	Daegu, South Korea	1st	110 m hurdles	13.16
2012	Olympic Games	London, United Kingdom	2nd	110 m hurdles	13.04
2013	World Championships	Moscow, Russia	4th	110 m hurdles	13.27

=== Track records ===
As of 16 September 2024, Richardson holds the following track records for 110 metres hurdles.

Location	Time	Windspeed m/s	Date	Notes
Daegu	13.11	–1.6	29/08/2011	Track record shared with David Oliver (USA) from 19/05/2010.
Orlando, FL.	13.36	–1.5	30/04/2015	
Strasbourg	13.35	+0.2	12/06/2011	
Tallahassee, FL.	13.21	–0.4	31/05/2008	
Toluca	13.32	–1.0	19/07/2008	

Awards
Preceded by Sanya Richards	USA Track & Field Youth Athlete of the Year; 2003	Succeeded by LaShawn Merritt
