= Francesca Doveri =

Italian athlete

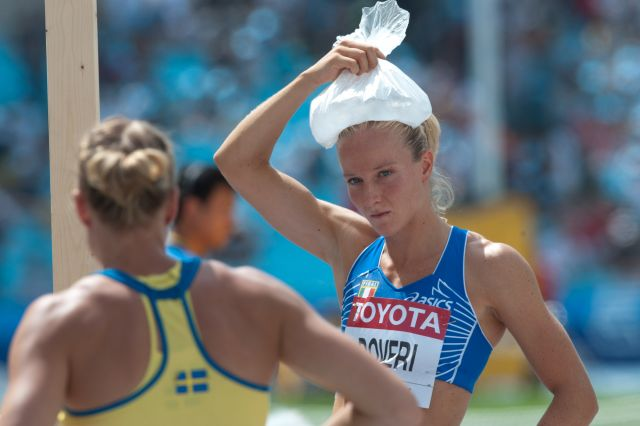
- Francesca Doveri at Daegu 2011

Personal information
- Nationality: Italian
- Born: 21 December 1982 (age 43) Pontedera
- Height: 1.79 m (5 ft 10 1/2 in)
- Weight: 64 kg (141 lb)

Sport
- Country: Italy
- Sport: Athletics
- Event: Combined events

Achievements and titles
- Personal bests: Eptathlon: 5988 pts (2011); Pentathlon: 4423 pts (2009)

Francesca Doveri (born 21 December 1982) is an Italian female retired heptathlete, which participated at the 2011 World Championships in Athletics.

== National records ==
- Pentathlon: 4423 pts ( (Italy) Ancona, 1 February 2009) - Current holder
  - 8.38 (60 metres hurdles), 1.72 m (high jump), 12.39 m (shot put), 6.29 m (long jump), 2:16.41 (800 metres)

== Achievements ==
Year	Competition	Venue	Position	Event	Performance	Notes
2011	European Indoor Championships	(Italy) Turin	9th	Pentathlon	4384 pts	
2011	World Championships	(South Korea) Daegu	26th	Heptathlon	5786 pts	

== National titles ==
She won 5 national championships at senior level.

- Italian Athletics Championships
  - Heptathlon: 2008, 2010
- Italian Indoor Athletics Championships
  - Pentathlon: 2008, 2009, 2011

== See also ==
- Italian records in athletics
- Italian all-time lists - Heptathlon
