= Alena Matoshka =

Belarusian hammer thrower

Personal information
- Nationality: Belarusian
- Born: 23 June 1982 (age 44) Belarus

Sport
- Country: Belarus
- Sport: Athletics
- Event: Hammer throw

Achievements and titles
- Personal best: 76.56m (2012)

Alena Matoshka (Belarusian: Алена Матошка; born 23 June 1982) is a Belarusian hammer thrower.

Although Matoshka competed in the hammer throw event at the 2012 Summer Olympics in London, her qualification round ranking was disqualified seven years later in 2019 for failing a drugs test in a re-analysis of her doping sample.
