= 2011 World Championships in Athletics – Women's 400 metres =

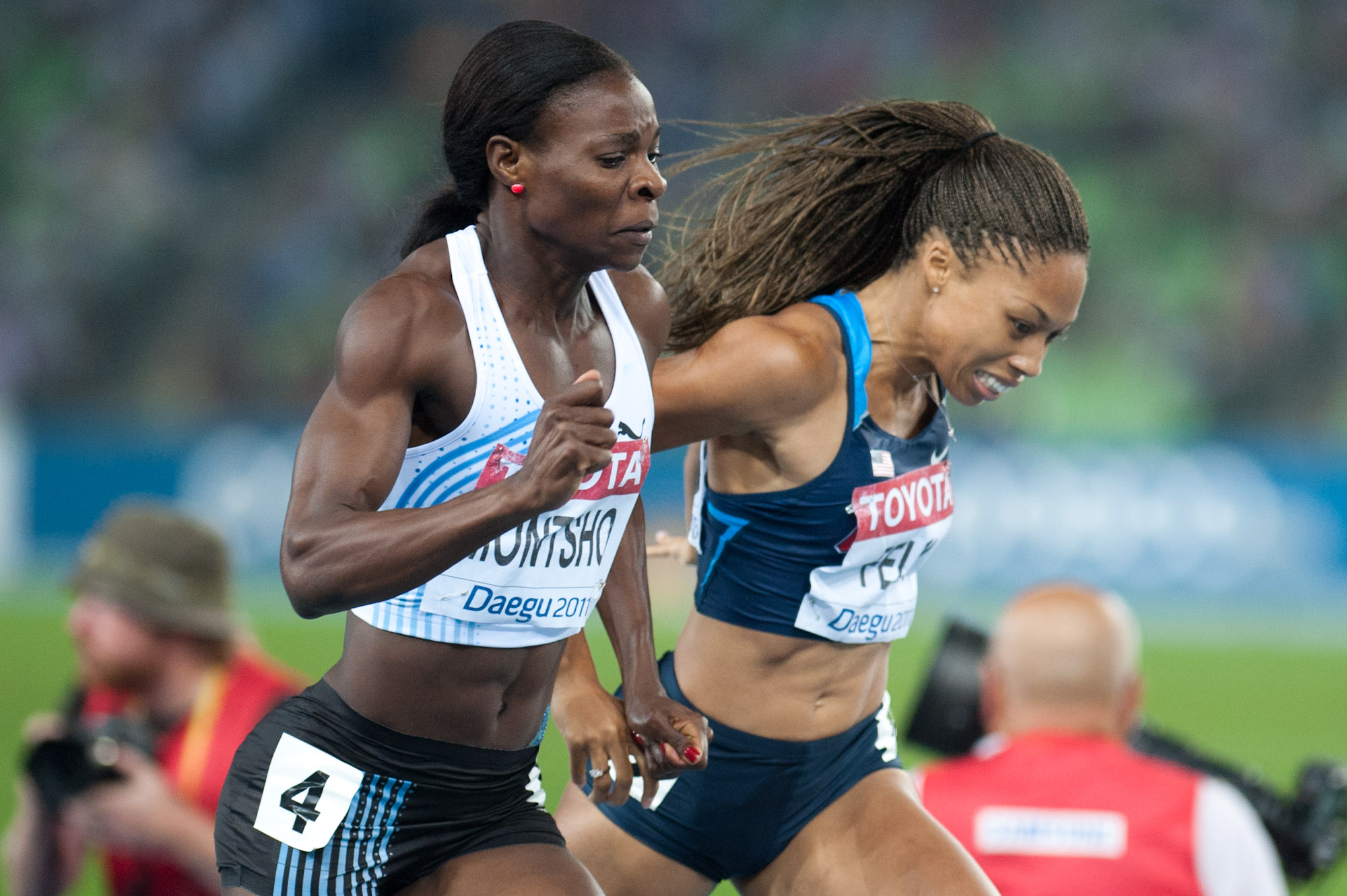
The finish of the women's 400 metres at Daegu, Allyson Felix straining to try to catch Amantle Montsho

Official Video

The Women's 400 metres at the 2011 World Championships in Athletics was held at the Daegu Stadium on August 27, 28 and 29.

The defending champion was Sanya Richards-Ross and despite her poor form earlier in the season, she ran 49.66 seconds in London just three weeks before the championships. The only faster athlete that year was Russian champion Anastasiya Kapachinskaya, who had run a personal best of 49.35 sec. Three-time 200 m world champion, Allyson Felix, was also challenging for the 400 m title, while Amantle Montsho (ranked third that year) had five straight wins on the Diamond League circuit. Jamaica's Rosemarie Whyte, Novlene Williams-Mills and Shericka Williams were also contenders, as was 2009 third placer Antonina Krivoshapka.

The event started in controversy when reigning Olympic champion Christine Ohuruogu was disqualified in her preliminary race for a false start. 2011 was the first year of a new IAAF rule allowing no leniency for a false start.

In the final, Montsho was a clear leader off of the turn, with Felix closing fast at the end to make the race close. This was Felix's personal best. Not only was this Montsho's personal best, but also the national record for Botswana. For the bronze medal, Anastasia Kapachinskaya was faster down the final 80 metres to pull away from Francena McCorory, who had run her personal best in the semi-finals.

After the championships, Kapachinskaya was disqualified for a doping violation for having stanozol and turinabol in tests held during the 2008 Olympics. She received a lifetime ban. In 2017, McCorory was advanced to the bronze medal.

== Medalists ==
Gold	Silver	Bronze
Amantle Montsho; Botswana	Allyson Felix; United States	Francena McCorory; United States

== Records ==
Prior to the competition, the records were as follows:

World record	Marita Koch (GDR)	47.60	Canberra, Australia	6 October 1985
Championship record	Jarmila Kratochvílová (TCH)	47.99	Helsinki, Finland	10 August 1983
World Leading	Anastasia Kapachinskaya (RUS)	49.35	Cheboksary, Russia	22 July 2011
African Record	Falilat Ogunkoya (NGR)	49.10	Atlanta, GA, United States	29 July 1996
Asian Record	Yuqin Ma (CHN)	49.81	Beijing, China	11 September 1993
North, Central American and Caribbean record	Sanya Richards-Ross (USA)	48.70	Athens, Greece	16 September 2006
South American record	Ximena Restrepo (COL)	49.64	Barcelona, Spain	5 August 1992
European Record	Marita Koch (GDR)	47.60	Canberra, Australia	6 October 1985
Oceanian record	Cathy Freeman (AUS)	48.63	Atlanta, GA, United States	29 July 1996

== Qualification standards ==
A time	B time
51.50	52.30

== Schedule ==
Date	Time	Round
August 27, 2011	20:05	Heats
August 28, 2011	18:55	Semifinals
August 29, 2011	21:05	Final

== Results ==
KEY:	q	Fastest non-qualifiers	Q	Qualified	NR	National record	PB	Personal best	SB	Seasonal best

=== Heats ===
Qualification: First 4 in each heat (Q) and the next 4 fastest (q) advance to the semifinals.

Rank	Heat	Name	Nationality	Time	Notes
1	4	Amantle Montsho	Botswana	50.95	Q
2	1	Novlene Williams-Mills	Jamaica	51.30	Q
3	2	Antonina Yefremova	Ukraine	51.35	Q
4	5	Sanya Richards-Ross	United States	51.37	Q
5	3	Rosemarie Whyte	Jamaica	51.38	Q
6	2	Anastasiya Kapachinskaya	Russia	51.43	Q
7	1	Allyson Felix	United States	51.45	Q
8	3	Antonina Krivoshapka	Russia	51.52	Q
9	5	Shericka Williams	Jamaica	51.66	Q
10	3	Nataliya Pyhyda	Ukraine	51.67	Q
11	1	Joanne Cuddihy	Ireland	51.82	Q, SB
12	1	Marta Milani	Italy	51.94	Q, SB
13	1	Geisa Coutinho	Brazil	52.15	q
14	4	Francena McCorory	United States	52.18	Q
15	2	Ndeye Fatou Soumah	Senegal	52.23	Q
15	3	Fantu Magiso	Ethiopia	52.23	Q
17	5	Moa Hjelmer	Sweden	52.26	Q
18	2	Jessica Beard	United States	52.40	Q
19	5	Denisa Rosolová	Czech Republic	52.51	Q
20	5	Nicola Sanders	Great Britain & N.I.	52.65	q
21	4	Lee McConnell	Great Britain & N.I.	52.75	Q
22	4	Maris Mägi	Estonia	52.93	Q
23	4	Norma González	Colombia	53.35	q
24	3	Racheal Nachula	Zambia	53.49	q, SB
25	1	Pınar Saka	Turkey	53.59	
25	2	Aliann Pompey	Guyana	53.59	
27	4	Aymée Martínez	Cuba	53.67	
28	3	Daisurami Bonne	Cuba	53.69	
29	2	Tjipekapora Herunga	Namibia	54.08	
30	5	Kseniya Karandyuk	Ukraine	54.10	
31	4	Ambwene Simukonda	Malawi	54.81	
32	2	Alaa Hikmat Al-Qaysi	Iraq	55.62	
33	5	Betty Burua	Papua New Guinea	56.98	
34	1	Graciela Martins	Guinea-Bissau	58.22	PB
35	1	Sandrine Thiébaud-Kangni	Togo	59.68	
36	3	Evodie Lydie Saramandji	Central African Republic	1:05.10	SB
	3	Christine Ohuruogu	Great Britain & N.I.	DSQ	

=== Semifinals ===
Qualification: First 2 in each heat (Q) and the next 2 fastest (q) advance to the final.

Rank	Heat	Name	Nationality	Time	Notes
1	3	Amantle Montsho	Botswana	50.13	Q
2	2	Francena McCorory	United States	50.24	Q, PB
3	1	Allyson Felix	United States	50.36	Q
4	3	Anastasiya Kapachinskaya	Russia	50.41	Q
5	2	Shericka Williams	Jamaica	50.46	Q, SB
6	1	Novlene Williams-Mills	Jamaica	50.48	Q
7	1	Antonina Krivoshapka	Russia	50.55	q
8	2	Sanya Richards-Ross	United States	50.66	q
9	2	Antonina Yefremova	Ukraine	50.88	
10	3	Rosemarie Whyte	Jamaica	50.90	
11	3	Jessica Beard	United States	51.27	
12	1	Nataliya Pyhyda	Ukraine	51.61	
13	2	Marta Milani	Italy	51.86	PB
14	2	Geisa Coutinho	Brazil	51.87	
15	2	Lee McConnell	Great Britain & N.I.	51.97	
16	3	Ndeye Fatou Soumah	Senegal	52.10	
17	2	Norma González	Colombia	52.29	
18	1	Moa Hjelmer	Sweden	52.35	
19	1	Nicola Sanders	Great Britain & N.I.	52.47	
20	3	Denisa Rosolová	Czech Republic	52.53	
21	1	Maris Mägi	Estonia	53.27	
22	3	Racheal Nachula	Zambia	53.30	SB
23	1	Fantu Magiso	Ethiopia	53.41	
	3	Joanne Cuddihy	Ireland	DSQ	

=== Final ===
Rank	Lane	Name	Nationality	Time	Notes
1st place, gold medalist(s)	4	Amantle Montsho	Botswana	49.56	NR
2nd place, silver medalist(s)	3	Allyson Felix	United States	49.59	PB
3rd place, bronze medalist(s)	5	Francena McCorory	United States	50.45	
4	2	Antonina Krivoshapka	Russia	50.66	
5	7	Shericka Williams	Jamaica	50.79	
6	1	Sanya Richards-Ross	United States	51.32	
7	8	Novlene Williams-Mills	Jamaica	52.89	
—	6	Anastasiya Kapachinskaya	Russia	~~50.24~~	DSQ
