= Japan at the 2011 World Championships in Athletics =

- WA code: JPN
- National federation: Japan Association of Athletics Federations
- Website: www.jaaf.or.jp/english/org/index.html

in Daegu
- Competitors: 48
- Medals: Gold 1 Silver 0 Bronze 0 Total 1

World Championships in Athletics appearances
- 1983; 1987; 1991; 1993; 1995; 1997; 1999; 2001; 2003; 2005; 2007; 2009; 2011; 2013; 2015; 2017; 2019; 2022; 2023; 2025

Japan competed at the 2011 World Championships in Athletics from August 27 to September 4 in Daegu, South Korea.

== Team selection ==
The country will send a 50-member squad to compete at the event. The final team composition was announced following the conclusion of the Asian Championships in Kobe, Japan, the final qualifying meeting as designated by the Japan Association of Athletics Federations.

The final team on the entry list comprises the names of 52 athletes, including 2 athletes invited by the IPC for exhibition events: Jun Hiromichi, 400m T53 (wheelchair) men, and Wakako Tsuchida, 800m T54 (wheelchair) women.

The following athletes appeared on the preliminary Entry List, but not on the Official Start List of the specific event, resulting in a total number of 48 competitors:

KEY:	Did not participate	Competed in another event

	Event	Athlete
Men	4 × 100 metres relay	Sota Kawatsura
Men	4 × 100 metres relay	Kei Takase
Men	4 × 400 metres relay	Takatoshi Abe
Men	4 × 400 metres relay	Yuta Imazeki
Women	4 × 100 metres relay	Kana Ichikawa
Women	4 × 100 metres relay	Satomi Kubokura

== Medalists ==
The following competitor from Japan won a medal at the Championships

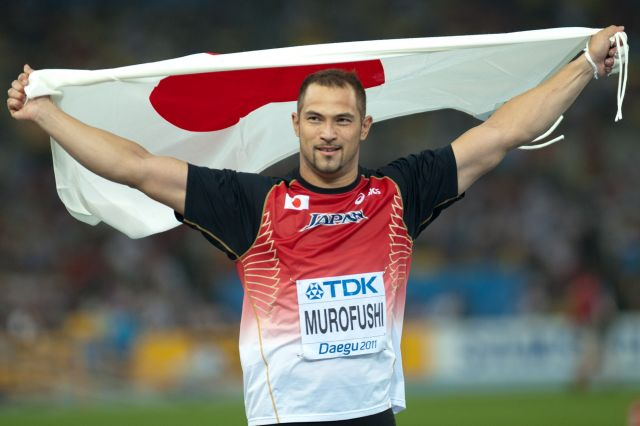
Koji Murofushi victory celebration at Daegu

Medal	Athlete	Event
Gold	Koji Murofushi	Hammer throw

== Results ==
=== Men ===
Athlete	Event	Preliminaries		Heats		Semifinals		Final	
Athlete	Event	Time Width Height	Rank	Time Width Height	Rank	Time Width Height	Rank	Time Width Height	Rank
Shinji Takahira	200 metres			20.87	26	20.90	16	Did not advance	
Hitoshi Saito	200 metres			20.80	21	21.17	19	Did not advance	
Yuichi Kobayashi	200 metres			21.27	46	Did not advance			
Yuzo Kanemaru	400 metres			45.51	19	46.11	20	Did not advance	
Masato Yokota	800 metres			1:47.60	26	Did not advance			
Kazuya Watanabe	5000 metres			14:20.64	33			Did not advance	
Yuki Sato	10,000 metres							29:04.15	15
Hiroyuki Horibata	Marathon							2:11:52	7
Kentaro Nakamoto	Marathon							2:13:10	10
Yuki Kawauchi	Marathon							2:16:11	18
Yoshinori Oda	Marathon							2:18:05	29
Yukihiro Kitaoka	Marathon							2:23:11 SB	38
Takayuki Kishimoto	400 m hurdles			49.51	17	50.05	20	Did not advance	
Yuta Imazeki	400 m hurdles			50.92	30	Did not advance			
Takatoshi Abe	400 m hurdles			51.90	33	Did not advance			
Yuichi Kobayashi; Masashi Eriguchi; Shinji Takahira; Hitoshi Saito	4 × 100 metres relay			38.66 SB	9			Did not advance	
Kei Takase; Yuzo Kanemaru; Yusuke Ishitsuka; Hideyuki Hirose	4 × 400 metres relay			3:02.64 SB	13			Did not advance	
Yusuke Suzuki	20 kilometres walk							1:21:39	8
Koichiro Morioka	50 kilometres walk							3:46:21	6
Takayuki Tanii	50 kilometres walk							3:48:03 SB	9
Hirooki Arai	50 kilometres walk							3:48:40 PB	10
Daichi Sawano	Pole vault	5.50	12 q					5.65 SB	14
Koji Murofushi	Hammer throw	78.56 SB	1					81.24 SB	1st place, gold medalist(s)
Yukifumi Murakami	Javelin throw	80.19	15					Did not advance	

Decathlon

Keisuke Ushiro	Decathlon			
Keisuke Ushiro	Event	Results	Points	Rank
	100 m	11.42	769	30
	Long jump	6.96	804	23
	Shot put	12.88	660	27
	High jump	2.02	822	12
	400 m	50.89	774	22
	110 m hurdles	15.20	825	26
	Discus throw	43.84	743	15
	Pole vault	4.40	731	21
	Javelin throw	67.73	855	4
	1500 m	4:43.87	656	13
Total			7639	20

=== Women ===
Athlete	Event	Preliminaries		Heats		Semifinals		Final	
Athlete	Event	Time Width Height	Rank	Time Width Height	Rank	Time Width Height	Rank	Time Width Height	Rank
Chisato Fukushima	100 metres			11.34	22 Q	11.59	22	Did not advance	
Chisato Fukushima	200 metres			23.25	23	23.52	20	Did not advance	
Hitomi Niiya	5000 metres			15:31.09	7			15:41.67	13
Megumi Kinukawa	5000 metres			15:38.23	16			Did not advance	
Kayo Sugihara	5000 metres			15:41.78 SB	18			Did not advance	
Hikari Yoshimoto	10,000 metres							32:32.22	14
Kayo Sugihara	10,000 metres							32:53.89	15
Megumi Kinukawa	10,000 metres							34:08.37	17
Yukiko Akaba	Marathon							2:29:35	5
Remi Nakazato	Marathon							2:30:52	10
Yoshimi Ozaki	Marathon							2:32:31	18
Azusa Nojiri	Marathon							2:33:42	19
Mai Ito	Marathon							2:35:16	22
Satomi Kubokura	400 m hurdles			56.66	24	56.87	21	Did not advance	
Minori Hayakari	3000 metres steeplechase			10:05.34	27			Did not advance	
Nao Okabe; Momoko Takahashi; Chisato Fukushima; Saori Imai	4 × 100 metres relay			43.83	12			Did not advance	
Kumi Otoshi	20 kilometres walk							1:34:37	20
Mayumi Kawasaki	20 kilometres walk							1:35:03	22
Masumi Fuchise	20 kilometres walk							DNF	
Masumi Aya	Hammer throw	64.09	27					Did not advance	
Yuki Ebihara	Javelin throw	59.88	10					59.08	9
Risa Miyashita	Javelin throw	55.62	26					Did not advance	
