= Kenya at the 2011 World Championships in Athletics =

- WA code: KEN
- National federation: Athletics Kenya
- Website: www.athleticskenya.org

in Daegu
- Competitors: 47
- Medals: Gold 7 Silver 7 Bronze 4 Total 18

World Championships in Athletics appearances (overview)
- 1983; 1987; 1991; 1993; 1995; 1997; 1999; 2001; 2003; 2005; 2007; 2009; 2011; 2013; 2015; 2017; 2019; 2022; 2023; 2025

Kenya competed at the 2011 World Championships in Athletics from August 27 to September 4 in Daegu, South Korea.

== Team selection ==
After the final day of the National Bank of Kenya National Athletics Championships, Athletics Kenya (AK) named 48 athletes for the competition.

Only a sprinkle of new faces made the provisional Daegu roster that is fronted by three Olympic champions (Asbel Kiprop, Brimin Kipruto, and Nancy Langat) and all the four gold winners (Abel Kirui, Ezekiel Kemboi, Vivian Cheruiyot, and Linet Masai) the country minted in Berlin two years ago.

Among the fresh names will be unheralded Hellen Obiri who caused the biggest upsets of the day when she scorched Olympic champion, Nancy Jebet Lagat at the homestretch in the women's 1500m. No field athlete made the Kenyan World Championships squad.

The following athletes appeared on the preliminary Entry List, but not on the Official Start List of the specific event, resulting in a total number of 47 competitors:

KEY:	Did not participate	Competed in another event

	Event	Athlete
Men	4 x 400 metres relay	Jackson Mumbwa Kivuva
Men	4 x 400 metres relay	Julius Kirwa

== Medalists ==
The following competitors from Kenya won medals at the Championships

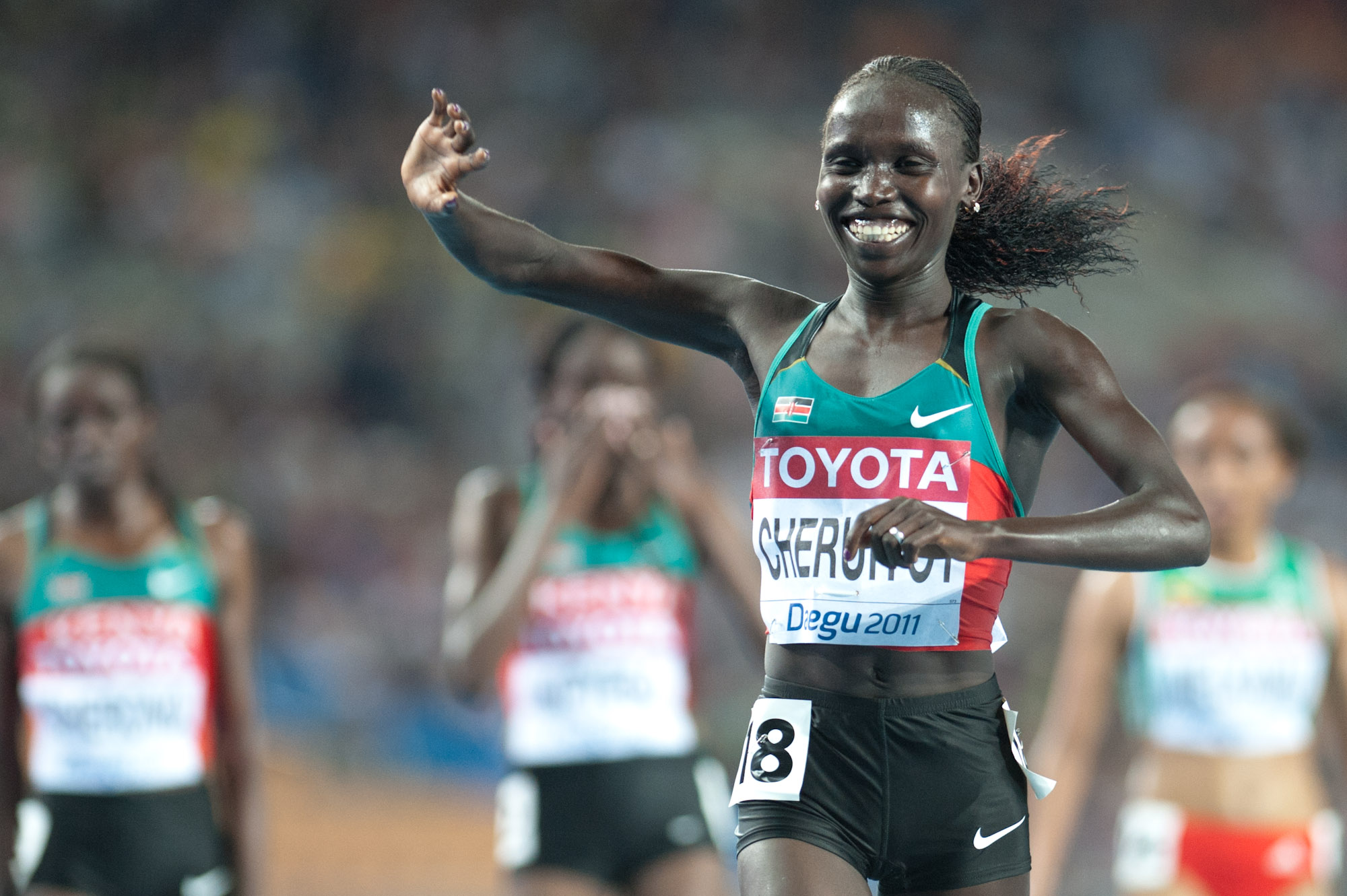
5000m/10,000m double gold medalist Vivian Jepkemoi Cheruiyot

Medal	Athlete	Event
Gold	David Lekuta Rudisha	800 metres
Gold	Asbel Kiprop	1500 metres
Gold	Abel Kirui	Marathon
Gold	Ezekiel Kemboi	3000 metres steeplechase
Gold	Vivian Jepkemoi Cheruiyot	5000 metres
Gold	Vivian Jepkemoi Cheruiyot	10,000 metres
Gold	Edna Ngeringwony Kiplagat	Marathon
Silver	Silas Kiplagat	1500 metres
Silver	Vincent Kipruto	Marathon
Silver	Brimin Kiprop Kipruto	3000 metres steeplechase
Silver	Sylvia Jebiwott Kibet	5000 metres
Silver	Sally Kipyego	10,000 metres
Silver	Priscah Jeptoo	Marathon
Silver	Milcah Chemos Cheywa	3000 metres steeplechase
Bronze	Janeth Jepkosgei Busienei	800 metres
Bronze	Linet Chepkwemoi Masai	10,000 metres
Bronze	Sharon Jemutai Cherop	Marathon
Bronze	Mercy Wanjiku	3000 metres steeplechase

== Results ==
=== Men ===
Athlete	Event	Preliminaries		Heats		Semifinals		Final	
Athlete	Event	Time Width Height	Rank	Time Width Height	Rank	Time Width Height	Rank	Time Width Height	Rank
David Lekuta Rudisha	800 metres			1:46.29	9	1:44.20	1	1:43.91	1st place, gold medalist(s)
Alfred Kirwa Yego	800 metres			1:45.50	3	1:44.82	6	1:45.83	7
Jackson Mumbwa Kivuva	800 metres			1:46.57	13	1:45.97	12	Did not advance	
Asbel Kiprop	1500 metres			3:41.22	19 Q	3:36.75	1 Q	3:35.69	1st place, gold medalist(s)
Silas Kiplagat	1500 metres			3:40.13	11 Q	3:46.75	15 Q	3:35.92	2nd place, silver medalist(s)
Daniel Kipchirchir Komen	1500 metres			3:38.54	1 Q	3:37.58	9	Did not advance	
Isaiah Kiplangat Koech	5000 metres			13:34.54	4			13:24.95	4
Thomas Pkemei Longosiwa	5000 metres			13:34.46	2			13:26.73	6
Eliud Kipchoge	5000 metres			13:39.02	11			13:27.27	7
Martin Irungu Mathathi	10,000 metres							27:23.87	5
Peter Cheruiyot Kirui	10,000 metres							27:25.63 PB	6
Paul Kipngetich Tanui	10,000 metres							27:54.03	9
Abel Kirui	Marathon							2:07:38 SB	1st place, gold medalist(s)
Vincent Kipruto	Marathon							2:10:06	2nd place, silver medalist(s)
David Barmasai Tumo	Marathon							2:11:39	5
Eliud Kiptanui	Marathon							2:11:50	6
Benjamin Kolum Kiptoo	Marathon							DNF	
Vincent Kiplangat Kosgei	400 m hurdles			49.49	16 q	49.71	19	Did not advance	
Ezekiel Kemboi	3000 metres steeplechase			8:10.93	1 Q			8:14.85	1st place, gold medalist(s)
Brimin Kiprop Kipruto	3000 metres steeplechase			8:21.89	9 Q			8:16.05	2nd place, silver medalist(s)
Richard Kipkemboi Mateelong	3000 metres steeplechase			8:23.76	13 Q			8:19.31	7
Abraham Chirchir	3000 metres steeplechase			8:23.09	11 q			8:33.56	14
Vincent Kiplangat Kosgei; Vincent Mumo Kiilu; Anderson Mureta Mutegi; Mark Mutai	4 x 400 metres relay			3:00.97 SB	8			3:01.15	6
David Kimutai Rotich	20 kilometres walk							1:27:20 SB	32

=== Women ===
Athlete	Event	Preliminaries		Heats		Semifinals		Final	
Athlete	Event	Time Width Height	Rank	Time Width Height	Rank	Time Width Height	Rank	Time Width Height	Rank
Janeth Jepkosgei Busienei	800 metres			1:59.36	1	1:58.50 SB	3	1:57.42 SB	3rd place, bronze medalist(s)
Eunice Jepkoech Sum	800 metres			2:01.37	13	1:59.94	13	Did not advance	
Cherono Koech	800 metres			2:01.03	7	2:01.48	17	Did not advance	
Hellen Onsando Obiri	1500 metres			4:07.59	4 Q	4:08.93	9 Q	4:20.23	11
Viola Jelagat Kibiwott	1500 metres			4:10.74	14 Q	4:08.64	13	Did not advance	
Nancy Jebet Langat	1500 metres			4:14.37	23 Q	4:12.92	24	Did not advance	
Vivian Jepkemoi Cheruiyot	5000 metres			15:34.80	12 Q			14:55.36	1st place, gold medalist(s)
Sylvia Jebiwott Kibet	5000 metres			15:20.08	3 Q			14:56.21	2nd place, silver medalist(s)
Mercy Cherono	5000 metres			15:20.01	2 Q			15:00.23	5
Linet Chepkwemoi Masai	5000 metres			15:33.99	10 Q			15:01.01	6
Vivian Jepkemoi Cheruiyot	10,000 metres							30:48.98 PB	1st place, gold medalist(s)
Sally Kipyego	10,000 metres							30:50.04	2nd place, silver medalist(s)
Linet Chepkwemoi Masai	10,000 metres							30:53.59 SB	3rd place, bronze medalist(s)
Priscah Jepleting Cherono	10,000 metres							30:56.43 PB	4
Edna Ngeringwony Kiplagat	Marathon							2:28:43	1st place, gold medalist(s)
Priscah Jeptoo	Marathon							2:29:00	2nd place, silver medalist(s)
Sharon Jemutai Cherop	Marathon							2:29:14 SB	3rd place, bronze medalist(s)
Irene Jerotich Kosgei	Marathon							2:31:29 SB	13
Caroline Rotich	Marathon							2:37:07 SB	29
Milcah Chemos Cheywa	3000 metres steeplechase			9:35.61	7			9:17.16	2nd place, silver medalist(s)
Mercy Wanjiku Njoroge	3000 metres steeplechase			9:24.95	3			9:17.88	3rd place, bronze medalist(s)
Lydiah Jebet Rotich	3000 metres steeplechase			9:36.70	10			9:25.74	5
Grace Wanjiru Njue	20 kilometres walk							1:43:59	38
