= 2011 World Championships in Athletics – Women's 10,000 metres =

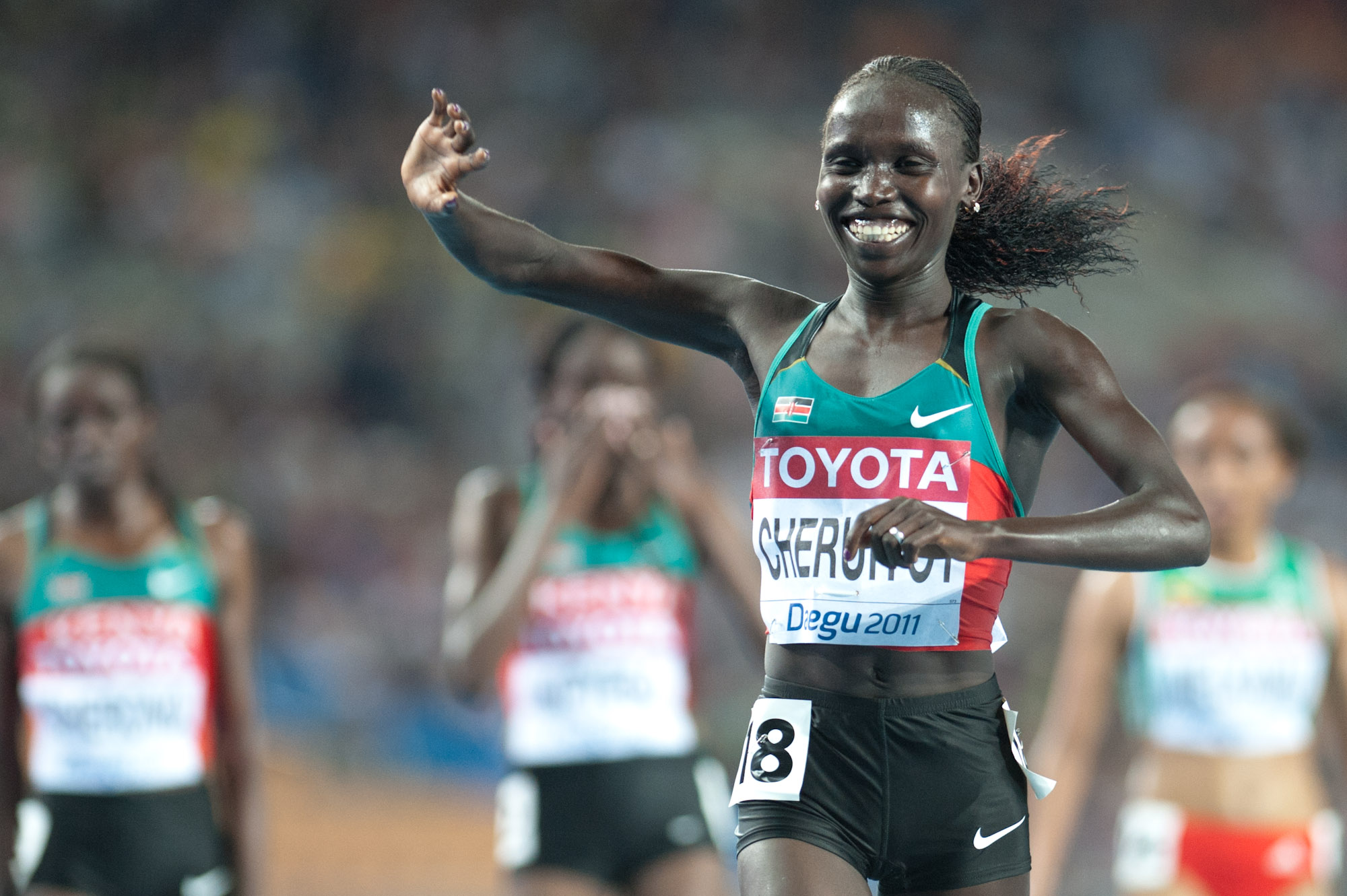
Vivian Cheruiyot after leading the Kenyan sweep of the 10,000.

Official Video

The Women's 10,000 metres at the 2011 World Championships in Athletics was held at the Daegu Stadium on August 27.

Kenya entered a strong team including the 2009 champion Linet Masai, the reigning 5000 metres world champion Vivian Cheruiyot, and Sally Kipyego – the fastest 10,000 m runner that year. The next strongest competitors were the Ethiopian women, which included the 2009 runner-up Meselech Melkamu and Meseret Defar. The United States was represented by 2007 World bronze medallist Kara Goucher and 2008 Olympic third placer Shalane Flanagan (who was the second fastest that year).

An American trio of Goucher, Flanagan and Jen Rhines set the pace in the initial stages of the competition. After around 3000 metres, the Kenyan and Ethiopian teams asserted themselves and it was only Flanagan and Shitaye Eshete who maintained the positions with them. The leading pack reached the halfway point in 15:47.04 minutes and the pace became increasingly quicker at this point – a fact which saw Tigist Kiros fall away from the pack. Flanagan and Eshete were the next to trail away, then Meseret Defar dropped out entirely with stomach pains, reducing the leading pack to the four Kenyans (Masai, Cheruiyot, Kipyego and Priscah Jepleting Cherono) and Meselech Melkamu. In the final lap, it was Cheruiyot and Kipyego who surged away into the lead. Cheruiyot held off her compatriot near the finish line to win the gold with a personal best of 30:48.98 minutes in what was only her third ever race over the distance. Kipyego took second, while Masai had a late run to take the bronze for a Kenyan sweep of the medals. Cherono was the fourth woman across the line and Meselech took fifth. Eshete ran a Bahraini record of 31:21.57 minutes for sixth.

Kenya became only the third country to have its athletes take positions one through four in an event (the other two being Ethiopia in the women's 5000 metres and the United States in the men's 200 metres, both at 2005 World Championships). The podium sweep was also unique in that it was the first time any nation had won all the medals on one day of the championships, as Kenyan women had taken all three medals in the women's marathon (the only other final of the first day).

== Medalists ==
Gold	Silver	Bronze
Vivian Cheruiyot; Kenya	Sally Kipyego; Kenya	Linet Masai; Kenya

== Records ==
Prior to the competition, the records were as follows:

World record	Junxia Wang (CHN)	29:31.78	Beijing, China	8 September 1993
Championship record	Berhane Adere (ETH)	30:04.18	Paris, France	23 August 2003
World Leading	Sally Kipyego (KEN)	30:38.35	Palo Alto, CA, United States	29 May 2011
African record	Meselech Melkamu (ETH)	29:53.80	Utrecht, Netherlands	14 June 2009
Asian record	Junxia Wang (CHN)	29:31.78	Beijing, China	8 September 1993
North, Central American and Caribbean record	Shalane Flanagan (USA)	30:22.22	Beijing, China	15 August 2008
South American record	Simone da Silva (BRA)	31:16.56	São Paulo, Brazil	3 August 2011
European record	Elvan Abeylegesse (TUR)	29:56.34	Beijing, China	15 August 2008
Oceanian record	Kim Smith (NZL)	30:35.54	Palo Alto, CA, United States	4 May 2008

== Qualification standards ==
A time	B time
31:45.00	32:00.00

== Schedule ==
Date	Time	Round
August 27, 2011	21:00	Final

== Results ==
KEY:	q	Fastest non-qualifiers	Q	Qualified	NR	National record	PB	Personal best	SB	Seasonal best

=== Final ===
Rank	Name	Nationality	Time	Notes
1st place, gold medalist(s)	Vivian Cheruiyot	Kenya	30:48.98	PB
2nd place, silver medalist(s)	Sally Kipyego	Kenya	30:50.04	
3rd place, bronze medalist(s)	Linet Masai	Kenya	30:53.59	SB
4	Priscah Jepleting Cherono	Kenya	30:56.43	PB
5	Meselech Melkamu	Ethiopia	30:56.55	SB
6	Shitaye Eshete	Bahrain	31:21.57	NR
7	Shalane Flanagan	United States	31:25.57	
8	Ana Dulce Félix	Portugal	31:37.03	
9	Jennifer Rhines	United States	31:47.59	
10	Jessica Augusto	Portugal	32:06.68	SB
11	Tigist Kiros	Ethiopia	32:11.37	
12	Christelle Daunay	France	32:22.20	
13	Kara Goucher	United States	32:29.58	
14	Hikari Yoshimoto	Japan	32:32.22	
15	Kayo Sugihara	Japan	32:53.89	
16	Krisztina Papp	Hungary	32:56.02	
17	Megumi Kinukawa	Japan	34:08.37	SB
	Meseret Defar	Ethiopia	DNF	
	Eloise Wellings	Australia	DNS	
