= Uganda at the 2011 World Championships in Athletics =

- WA code: UGA
- National federation: Uganda Athletics Federation

in Daegu
- Competitors: 12
- Medals: Gold 0 Silver 0 Bronze 0 Total 0

World Championships in Athletics appearances
- 1983; 1987; 1991; 1993; 1995; 1997; 1999; 2001; 2003; 2005; 2007; 2009; 2011; 2013; 2015; 2017; 2019; 2022; 2023

Uganda competed at the 2011 World Championships in Athletics from August 27 to September 4 in Daegu, South Korea.

== Team selection ==
A team of 14 athletes was announced to represent the country in the event. The team is led by Moses Kipsiro, a 2007 World Championships 5000m bronze medallist.

The following athletes appeared on the preliminary Entry List, but not on the Official Start List of the specific event, resulting in a total number of 12 competitors:

KEY:	Did not participate	Competed in another event

	Event	Athlete
Men	1500 metres	Jacob Araptany
Men	5000 metres	Moses Ndiema Kipsiro
Men	10,000 metres	Moses Ndiema Kipsiro
Men	Marathon	Richard Kiprotich Soibei

== Results ==
=== Men ===
Athlete	Event	Preliminaries		Heats		Semifinals		Final	
Athlete	Event	Time Width Height	Rank	Time Width Height	Rank	Time Width Height	Rank	Time Width Height	Rank
Julius Mutekanga	800 metres			1:47.54	25	Did not advance			
Abraham Kiplimo	5000 metres			13:44.09	16			Did not advance	
Geoffrey Kusuro	5000 metres			13:54.58	25			Did not advance	
Moses Kibet	5000 metres			14:05.15	30			Did not advance	
Stephen Kiprotich	Marathon							2:12:57	9
Daniel Kipkorir Chepyegon	Marathon							DNF	
Nicholas Kiprono	Marathon							DNF	
Jacob Araptany	3000 metres steeplechase			8:18.57	6			8:18.67	6
Benjamin Kiplagat	3000 metres steeplechase			8:19.96	7			8:22.21	10
Simon Ayeko	3000 metres steeplechase			8:29.02 SB	18			Did not advance	

=== Women ===
Athlete	Event	Preliminaries		Heats		Semifinals		Final	
Athlete	Event	Time Width Height	Rank	Time Width Height	Rank	Time Width Height	Rank	Time Width Height	Rank
Annet Negesa	800 metres			2:02.75	21	2:01.51	18	Did not advance	
Sarah Nambawa	Triple jump	13.22	33					Did not advance	
