= 2011 World Championships in Athletics – Women's 5000 metres =

Official Video

The Women's 5000 metres at the 2011 World Championships in Athletics was held at the Daegu Stadium on August 30, and September 2.

Vivian Cheruiyot entered the competition as the reigning 2009 World Champion, the 2011 World Cross Country Champion, the Diamond League leader, and the fastest woman of the year (having become the fourth fastest ever with a run of 14:20.87 minutes). Ethiopians Meseret Defar and Sentayehu Ejigu had run the next quickest that season. The top twelve ranked runners prior to the championships were all either Kenyan or Ethiopian; Linet Masai, Sylvia Kibet, Mercy Cherono and Genzebe Dibaba were the other contenders from the two dominant countries. Lauren Fleshman of the United States was the fastest non-African in the final.

The final started with Hitomi Niiya taking a large early lead in an effort to steal the race. After several laps in the spotlight she was swallowed up by the pack, which slowly disintegrated. With a lap to go, it was three Ethiopian and four Kenyan runners to settle it. Cheruiyot led as the group stretched out, with Defar challenging into the final straight, where Cheruiyot pulled away. Kibet passed a fading Defar before the finish, for the silver. Exactly the same medals as two years before.

== Medalists ==
Gold	Silver	Bronze
Vivian Cheruiyot; Kenya	Sylvia Jebiwott Kibet; Kenya	Meseret Defar; Ethiopia

== Records ==
Prior to the competition, the records were as follows:

World record	Tirunesh Dibaba (ETH)	14:11.15	Oslo, Norway	6 June 2008
Championship record	Tirunesh Dibaba (ETH)	14:38.59	Helsinki, Finland	13 August 2005
World Leading	Vivian Cheruiyot (KEN)	14:20.87	Stockholm, Sweden	29 July 2011
African Record	Tirunesh Dibaba (ETH)	14:11.15	Oslo, Norway	6 June 2008
Asian Record	Bo Jiang (CHN)	14:28.09	Shanghai, China	23 October 1997
North, Central American and Caribbean record	Molly Huddle (USA)	14:44.76	Brussels, Belgium	27 August 2010
South American record	Simone da Silva (BRA)	15:18.85	São Paulo, Brazil	20 May 2011
European Record	Liliya Shobukhova (RUS)	14:23.75	Kazan, Russia	19 July 2008
Oceanian record	Kim Smith (NZL)	14:45.93	Rome, Italy	11 July 2008

== Qualification standards ==
A time	B time
15:14.00	15:25.00

== Schedule ==
Date	Time	Round
August 30, 2011	10:20	Heats
September 2, 2011	20:25	Final

== Results ==
KEY:	q	Fastest non-qualifiers	Q	Qualified	NR	National record	PB	Personal best	SB	Seasonal best

=== Heats ===
Qualification: First 5 in each heat (Q) and the next 5 fastest (q) advance to the final.

Rank	Heat	Name	Nationality	Time	Notes
1	1	Meseret Defar	Ethiopia	15:19.46	Q
2	1	Mercy Cherono	Kenya	15:20.01	Q
3	1	Sylvia Jebiwott Kibet	Kenya	15:20.08	Q
4	1	Sentayehu Ejigu	Ethiopia	15:20.13	Q
5	1	Yelena Zadorozhnaya	Russia	15:23.90	Q
6	1	Amy Hastings	United States	15:29.49	q
7	1	Hitomi Niiya	Japan	15:31.09	q
8	2	Genzebe Dibaba	Ethiopia	15:33.06	Q
9	2	Tejitu Daba	Bahrain	15:33.67	Q
10	2	Linet Masai	Kenya	15:33.99	Q
11	2	Lauren Fleshman	United States	15:34.04	Q
12	2	Vivian Cheruiyot	Kenya	15:34.80	Q
13	2	Zakia Mrisho	Tanzania	15:35.37	q, SB
14	2	Yelizaveta Grechishnikova	Russia	15:35.64	q
15	1	Helen Clitheroe	Great Britain & N.I.	15:37.73	q
16	2	Megumi Kinukawa	Japan	15:38.23	
17	2	Alemitu Bekele Degfa	Turkey	15:38.25	
18	1	Kayo Sugihara	Japan	15:41.78	SB
19	2	Molly Huddle	United States	15:42.00	
20	1	Alia Saeed Mohammed	United Arab Emirates	16:10.37	
21	2	Viktoriia Poliudina	Kyrgyzstan	16:32.68	SB
22	1	Pauline Niyongere	Burundi	17:23.56	SB
	1	Sabine Fischer	Switzerland	DNS	

=== Final ===
Rank	Name	Nationality	Time	Notes
1st place, gold medalist(s)	Vivian Cheruiyot	Kenya	14:55.36	
2nd place, silver medalist(s)	Sylvia Jebiwott Kibet	Kenya	14:56.21	
3rd place, bronze medalist(s)	Meseret Defar	Ethiopia	14:56.94	
4	Sentayehu Ejigu	Ethiopia	14:59.99	
5	Mercy Cherono	Kenya	15:00.23	
6	Linet Masai	Kenya	15:01.01	
7	Lauren Fleshman	United States	15:09.25	
8	Genzebe Dibaba	Ethiopia	15:09.35	
9	Tejitu Daba	Bahrain	15:14.62	PB
10	Yelena Zadorozhnaya	Russia	15:15.48	
11	Zakia Mrisho	Tanzania	15:18.81	SB
12	Helen Clitheroe	Great Britain & N.I.	15:21.22	
13	Hitomi Niiya	Japan	15:41.67	
14	Yelizaveta Grechishnikova	Russia	15:45.61	
15	Amy Hastings	United States	15:56.06	
