= 2011 Algerian Athletics Championships =

- Dates: 27–28 July 2011
- Host city: Algiers, Algeria

The 2011 Algerian Athletics Championships was the year's national championship in outdoor track and field for Algeria. It was held on 27 and 28 July in Algiers.

Sonia Halliche equalled the Algerian record in the women's pole vault with her clearance of 3.70 m (12 ft 1 1/2 in) and Zahra Badrane set a national record in the women's javelin throw with 46.33 m (152 ft 0 in).

== Results ==
=== Men ===
Event	Winner	Result
100 m	Redha Megdoud	10.54
200 m	Redha Megdoud	21.31
400 m	Faiçal Cherifi	47.44
800 m	Mahfoud Brahimi	1:47.47
1500 m	Taoufik Makhloufi	3:54.26
5000 m	Abdelghani Belkhiri	14:27.23
110 m hurdles	Othmane Hadj Lazib	13.50
400 m hurdles	Abderrahmane Hammadi	50.88
3000 m s'chase	Hicham Bouchicha	8:36.81
High jump	Hamza Labadi	2.12
Long jump	Ala Eddine Ben Hassine (TUN)	7.84 m w
Triple jump	Issam Nima	16.80 m
Discus throw	Abdelmoumne Bourakba	53.34 m

=== Women ===
Event	Winner	Result
100 m	Souheir Bouali	11.95
800 m	Amina Bettiche	2:12.78
1500 m	Amina Bettiche	4:24.23
5000 m	Souad Aït Salem	17:30.16
100 m hurdles	Amina Ferguen	13.38 w
400 m hurdles	Houria Moussa	58.14
3000 m s'chase	Nawal Yahi	10:36.32
Pole vault	Sonia Halliche	3.70 m NR=
Long jump	Romaissa Belbiod	6.04 m w
Triple jump	Baya Rahouli	14.49 m w
Shot put	Souhir Dhaouadi (TUN)	14.31 m
Hammer throw	Zouina Bouzebra	56.12 m
Javelin throw	Zahra Badrane	46.33 m NR
