= 2011 World Championships in Athletics – Women's 800 metres =

Women's 800 metres at the 2011 World Championships
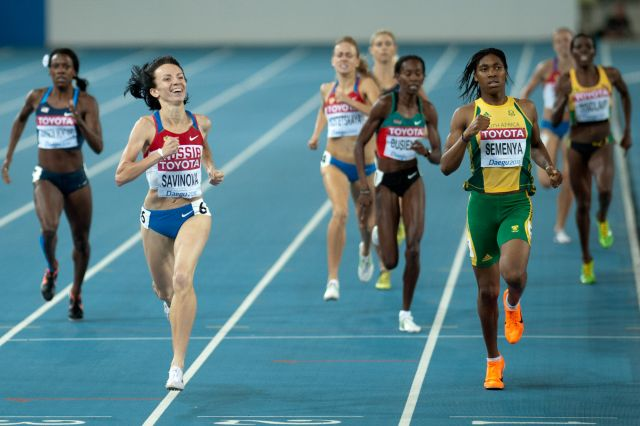
- The finish of the final.
- Venue: Daegu Stadium
- Dates: 1 September (heats); 2 September (semifinals); 4 September (final)
- Competitors: 32 from 25 nations
- Winning time: 1:56.35

Medalists
gold medal	Caster Semenya; South Africa
silver medal	Janeth Jepkosgei; Kenya
bronze medal	Alysia Johnson Montaño; United States

Official Video

Official Video

The Women's 800 metres at the 2011 World Championships in Athletics was held at the Daegu Stadium on September 1, 2 and 4.

The three fastest times prior to the championships were all run at the Russian national trials, with Mariya Savinova leading the rankings with 1:56.95 minutes, followed by Yuliya Rusanova and Ekaterina Kostetskaya. However, Kenia Sinclair of Jamaica and Britain's Jenny Meadows had been the leading athletes on the Diamond League circuit. Caster Semenya, the 2009 champion, was among the fastest that year, but had been affected by injury and an 11-month career break due to gender verification tests. Moroccan Halima Hachlaf and American champion Alysia Johnson Montano were highly ranked, while reigning Olympic and World silver medallist Janeth Jepkosgei was another prominent competitor.

It took under 1:59 just to make the final. Led by defending champion Semenya, the three Russians all qualified, along with two Americans, returning silver medalist Jepkosgei and Kenia Sinclair, leaving previous bronze medalist Jenny Meadows as the fastest non-qualifier.

In the final, Jepkosgei led through a fast 55.86-second first lap, followed by Sinclair and Alysia Johnson Montaño. On the backstretch, defending champion Semenya cruised past the field, taking the lead with about 180 metres to go. She continued to pull away, but not emphatically. Savinova had trailed the field and followed Semenya as she moved up, then kicked it into gear on the final straight, easing past Semenya without challenge. Montaño took a dive at the finish line but was unable to beat Jepkosgei for third place.

On 28 July 2014, IAAF announced that 5th-place finisher Kostetskaya was sanctioned for doping after her biological passport had shown abnormalities. Her result was disqualified. On February 10, 2017, the Court of Arbitration for Sport (Cas) officially disqualified Savinova's results backdated to July 2010. When medals were reallocated, everyone moved up.

== Medalists ==
Gold	Silver	Bronze
Caster Semenya; South Africa	Janeth Jepkosgei; Kenya	Alysia Johnson Montano; United States

== Records ==
Prior to the competition, the records were as follows:

World record	Jarmila Kratochvílová (TCH)	1:53.28	Munich, West Germany	26 July 1983
Championship record	Jarmila Kratochvílová (TCH)	1:54.68	Helsinki, Finland	9 August 1983
World Leading	Mariya Savinova (RUS)	1:56.95	Cheboksary, Russia	22 July 2011
African Record	Pamela Jelimo (KEN)	1:54.01	Zürich, Switzerland	29 August 2008
Asian Record	Dong Liu (CHN)	1:55.54	Beijing, China	9 September 1993
North, Central American and Caribbean record	Ana Fidelia Quirot (CUB)	1:54.44	Barcelona, Spain	9 September 1989
South American record	Letitia Vriesde (SUR)	1:56.68	Gothenburg, Sweden	13 August 1995
European Record	Jarmila Kratochvílová (TCH)	1:53.28	Munich, West Germany	26 July 1983
Oceanian record	Toni Hodgkinson (NZL)	1:58.25	Atlanta, United States	27 July 1996

== Qualification standards ==
A time	B time
1:59.80	2:01.30

== Schedule ==
Date	Time	Round
September 1, 2011	11:40	Heats
September 2, 2011	19:25	Semifinals
September 4, 2011	20:15	Final

== Results ==
KEY:	q	Fastest non-qualifiers	Q	Qualified	NR	National record	PB	Personal best	SB	Seasonal best

=== Heats ===
Qualification: First 4 in each heat (Q) and the next 4 fastest (q) advance to the semifinals.

Rank	Heat	Name	Nationality	Time	Notes
1	3	Janeth Jepkosgei	Kenya	1:59.36	Q
2	3	Ekaterina Kostetskaya	Russia	1:59.61	Q
3	3	Alysia Johnson Montaño	United States	1:59.62	Q
4	3	Marilyn Okoro	Great Britain & N.I.	1:59.74	Q
5	4	Mariya Savinova	Russia	2:01.01	Q
5	4	Caster Semenya	South Africa	2:01.01	Q
7	4	Cherono Koech	Kenya	2:01.03	Q
8	1	Jenny Meadows	Great Britain & N.I.	2:01.11	Q
8	4	Alice Schmidt	United States	2:01.11	Q
10	4	Emma Jackson	Great Britain & N.I.	2:01.17	q
11	1	Maggie Vessey	United States	2:01.32	Q
12	1	Rosibel García	Colombia	2:01.33	Q, SB
13	1	Eunice Jepkoech Sum	Kenya	2:01.37	Q
14	1	Yuliya Rusanova	Russia	2:01.38	q
15	2	Kenia Sinclair	Jamaica	2:01.66	Q
16	2	Halima Hachlaf	Morocco	2:01.80	Q
17	2	Yuliya Krevsun	Ukraine	2:01.88	Q
18	4	Tintu Luka	India	2:01.89	q
19	2	Maryna Arzamasava	Belarus	2:01.97	Q
20	2	Fantu Magiso	Ethiopia	2:02.58	q
21	5	Annet Negesa	Uganda	2:02.75	Q
22	5	Zahra Bouras	Algeria	2:02.77	Q
23	5	Lucia Klocová	Slovakia	2:02.81	Q
24	5	Liliya Lobanova	Ukraine	2:02.84	Q
25	5	Nikki Hamblin	New Zealand	2:02.87	SB
26	1	Eglė Balčiūnaitė	Lithuania	2:02.88	
27	1	Yvonne Hak	Netherlands	2:03.05	
28	3	Luiza Gega	Albania	2:03.21	
29	4	Truong Thanh Hang	Vietnam	2:03.52	
30	5	Lemlem Bereket	Canada	2:03.62	
31	3	Margarita Matsko	Kazakhstan	2:04.24	
32	2	Merve Aydın	Turkey	2:04.88	
33	5	Sviatlana Usovich	Belarus	2:05.62	
34	2	Huh Yeon-jung	South Korea	2:08.05	
35	2	Zourah Ali	Djibouti	2:36.36	PB
	3	Tetiana Petlyuk	Ukraine	DNF	

=== Semifinals ===
Qualification: First 2 in each heat (Q) and the next 2 fastest (q) advance to the final.

Rank	Heat	Name	Nationality	Time	Notes
1	3	Caster Semenya	South Africa	1:58.07	Q, SB
2	2	Mariya Savinova	Russia	1:58.45	Q
3	2	Janeth Jepkosgei	Kenya	1:58.50	Q, SB
4	3	Ekaterina Kostetskaya	Russia	1:58.64	Q
5	2	Alysia Johnson Montaño	United States	1:58.67	q
6	1	Yuliya Rusanova	Russia	1:58.73	Q
7	3	Kenia Sinclair	Jamaica	1:58.93	q
8	1	Maggie Vessey	United States	1:58.98	Q
9	1	Jenny Meadows	Great Britain & N.I.	1:59.07	
10	3	Fantu Magiso	Ethiopia	1:59.17	NR
11	2	Liliya Lobanova	Ukraine	1:59.38	
12	2	Emma Jackson	Great Britain & N.I.	1:59.77	PB
13	1	Eunice Jepkoech Sum	Kenya	1:59.94	
14	1	Rosibel García	Colombia	2:00.79	SB
15	2	Tintu Luka	India	2:00.95	SB
16	3	Alice Schmidt	United States	2:01.16	
17	3	Cherono Koech	Kenya	2:01.48	
18	1	Annet Negesa	Uganda	2:01.51	
19	3	Marilyn Okoro	Great Britain & N.I.	2:01.54	
20	2	Lucia Klocová	Slovakia	2:01.85	
21	1	Maryna Arzamasava	Belarus	2:02.13	
22	3	Yuliya Krevsun	Ukraine	2:05.37	
23	2	Zahra Bouras	Algeria	2:12.08	
	1	Halima Hachlaf	Morocco	DNF	

=== Final ===
Rank	Name	Nationality	Time	Notes
1st place, gold medalist(s)	Caster Semenya	South Africa	1:56.35	SB
2nd place, silver medalist(s)	Janeth Jepkosgei	Kenya	1:57.42	SB
3rd place, bronze medalist(s)	Alysia Johnson Montaño	United States	1:57.48	SB
4	Maggie Vessey	United States	1:58.50	SB
5	Kenia Sinclair	Jamaica	1:58.66	
n/a	Mariya Savinova	Russia	~~1:55.87~~	DSQ
n/a	Ekaterina Kostetskaya	Russia	~~1:57.82~~	DSQ
n/a	Yuliya Rusanova	Russia	~~1:59.74~~	DSQ
