= Ethiopia at the 2011 World Championships in Athletics =

- WA code: ETH
- National federation: Ethiopian Athletic Federation
- Website: www.athleticsethiopia.org.et

in Daegu
- Competitors: 34
- Medals: Gold 1 Silver 0 Bronze 4 Total 5

World Championships in Athletics appearances
- 1983; 1987; 1991; 1993; 1995; 1997; 1999; 2001; 2003; 2005; 2007; 2009; 2011; 2013; 2015; 2017; 2019; 2022; 2023

Ethiopia competed at the 2011 World Championships in Athletics from August 27 to September 4 in Daegu, South Korea.

== Team selection ==
A provisional list of 36 athletes was announced to represent the country in the event. The participation of Kenenisa Bekele and Tirunesh Dibaba is said to be uncertain.

The final team on the entry list comprises the names of 42 athletes.

The following athletes appeared on the preliminary Entry List, but not on the Official Start List of the specific event, resulting in total number of 34 competitors:

KEY:	Did not participate	Competed in another event

	Event	Athlete
Men	1500 metres	Soresa Fida
Men	5000 metres	Tariku Bekele
Men	10,000 metres	Abera Kuma
Men	Marathon	Tadese Tola
Women	1500 metres	Tizita Bogale
Women	5000 metres	Emebet Anteneh
Women	10,000 metres	Belaynesh Oljira
Women	Marathon	Koren Jelela
Women	3000 metres steeplechase	Hiwot Ayalew

== Medalists ==
The following competitors from Ethiopia won medals at the Championships

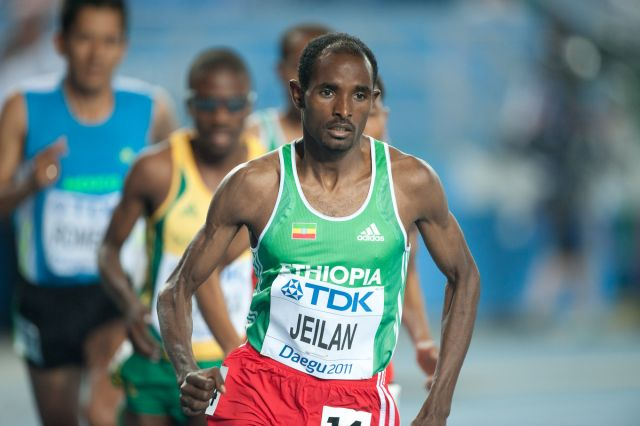
Ibrahim Jeilan won the gold medal in the Men's 10,000 metres event at this year's championships

Medal	Athlete	Event
Gold	Ibrahim Jeilan	10,000 metres
Bronze	Dejen Gebremeskel	5000 metres
Bronze	Imane Merga	10,000 metres
Bronze	Feyisa Lilesa	Marathon
Bronze	Meseret Defar	5000 metres

== Results ==
=== Men ===
Ibrahim Jeilan won the gold medal in a dramatic sprint finish in the men's 10,000m final.

Athlete	Event	Preliminaries		Heats		Semifinals		Final	
Athlete	Event	Time Width Height	Rank	Time Width Height	Rank	Time Width Height	Rank	Time Width Height	Rank
Mohammed Aman	800 metres			1:45.17	2 Q	1:44.57 NR	2 Q	1:45.93	8
Mekonnen Gebremedhin	1500 metres			3:41.28	20 Q	3:46.71	14 Q	3:36.81	7
Deresse Mekonnen	1500 metres			3:40.08	10 Q	3:44.65	11	Did not advance	
Zebene Alemayehu	1500 metres			3:41.08	18 q	3:51.19	25	Did not advance	
Dejen Gebremeskel	5000 metres			13:34.48	3 Q			13:23.92	(bronze)
Abera Kuma	5000 metres			13:38.41	10 Q			13:25.50	5
Imane Merga	5000 metres			13:37.96	8 Q			13:23.78	DSQ
Kenenisa Bekele	5000 metres			DNS				Did not advance	
Ibrahim Jeilan	10,000 metres							27:13.81	1st place, gold medalist(s)
Imane Merga	10,000 metres							27:19.14	3rd place, bronze medalist(s)
Sileshi Sihine	10,000 metres							27:34.11	8
Kenenisa Bekele	10,000 metres							DNF	
Feyisa Lilesa	Marathon							2:10:32 SB	3rd place, bronze medalist(s)
Eshetu Wendimu	Marathon							2:13:37	12
Chala Dechase	Marathon							DNF	
Gebregziabher Gebremariam	Marathon							DNF	
Bazu Worku	Marathon							DNF	
Roba Gari	3000 metres steeplechase			8:20.28	8 Q			8:18.37	5
Nahom Mesfin	3000 metres steeplechase			8:12.04	4 Q			8:25.39	11

=== Women ===
Athlete	Event	Preliminaries		Heats		Semifinals		Final	
Athlete	Event	Time Width Height	Rank	Time Width Height	Rank	Time Width Height	Rank	Time Width Height	Rank
Fantu Magiso	400 metres			52.23	15 Q	53.41	23	Did not advance	
Fantu Magiso	800 metres			2:02.58	20 q	1:59.17 NR	10	Did not advance	
Kalkidan Gezahegne	1500 metres			4:14.45	29 q	4:08.96	12 Q	4:06.42	5
Gelete Burka	1500 metres			4:07.91	6 Q	DNF		Did not advance	
Meskerem Assefa	1500 metres			4:12.43	21	did not advance			
Meseret Defar	5000 metres			15:19.46	1 Q			14:56.94	3rd place, bronze medalist(s)
Sentayehu Ejigu	5000 metres			15:20.13	4 Q			14:59.99	4
Genzebe Dibaba	5000 metres			15:33.06	8 Q			15:09.35	8
Meselech Melkamu	10,000 metres							30:56.55 SB	5
Tigist Kiros	10,000 metres							32:11.37	11
Meseret Defar	10,000 metres							DNF	
Bezunesh Bekele	Marathon							2:29:21	4
Aberu Kebede	Marathon							2:31:22	12
Atsede Baysa	Marathon							2:31:37	14
Aselefech Mergia	Marathon							DNF	
Dire Tune	Marathon							DQ	
Sofia Assefa	3000 metres steeplechase			9:32.48	6 Q			9:28.24	6
Birtukan Fente	3000 metres steeplechase			9:28.82	5 q			9:36.81	10
Birtukan Adamu	3000 metres steeplechase			9:37.31	12 Q			10:05.10	15
