= 2011 World Championships in Athletics – Men's 5000 metres =

Official Video

The men's 5000 metres at the 2011 World Championships in Athletics was held at the Daegu Stadium on September 1 and 4.

Jake Robertson of New Zealand was added to the final field at the judges' discretion after twice being pushed in his qualifying race.

The tactical final was almost full contact, with a pack of 14 staying close into the penultimate lap. Galen Rupp tried to take the kick out early. As the pack began to break up, Eliud Kipchoge went down while the leaders began to string out the field. Mo Farah led through the final lap as a host of Kenyan and finally Ethiopian athletes Imane Merga and Dejen Gebremeskel took a charge at him. Bernard Lagat worked his way through the traffic, coming up behind the final two Ethiopian runners pulling past them in lane 3 on the final straight. Lagat couldn't catch Farah. Merga finished in third but was later disqualified for stepping on the curb, giving the bronze to Gebremeskel.

== Medalists ==
Gold	Silver	Bronze
Mo Farah; Great Britain & N.I.	Bernard Lagat; United States	Dejen Gebremeskel; Ethiopia

== Records ==
Prior to the competition, the records were as follows:

World record	Kenenisa Bekele (ETH)	12:37.35	Hengelo, Netherlands	31 May 2004
Championship record	Eliud Kipchoge (KEN)	12:52.79	Paris, France	31 August 2003
World leading	Mo Farah (GBR)	12:53.11	Monaco	22 July 2011
African record	Kenenisa Bekele (ETH)	12:37.35	Hengelo, Netherlands	31 May 2004
Asian record	Saif Saaeed Shaheen (QAT)	12:51.98	Rome, Italy	14 July 2006
North, Central American and Caribbean record	Bernard Lagat (USA)	12:53.60	Monaco	22 July 2011
South American record	Marílson Gomes dos Santos (BRA)	13:19.43	Kassel, Germany	8 June 2006
European record	Mohammed Mourhit (BEL)	12:49.71	Brussels, Belgium	25 August 2000
Oceanian record	Craig Mottram (AUS)	12:55.76	London, Great Britain	30 July 2004

== Qualification standards ==
A time	B time
13:20.00	13:27.00

== Schedule ==
Date	Time	Round
September 1, 2011	10:05	Heats
September 4, 2011	19:40	Final

== Results ==
KEY:	q	Fastest non-qualifiers	Q	Qualified	NR	National record	PB	Personal best	SB	Seasonal best

=== Heats ===
Qualification: First 5 in each heat (Q) and the next 5 fastest (q) advance to the final.

Rank	Heat	Name	Nationality	Time	Notes
1	1	Bernard Lagat	United States	13:33.90	Q
2	1	Thomas Longosiwa	Kenya	13:34.46	Q
3	1	Dejen Gebremeskel	Ethiopia	13:34.48	Q
4	1	Isaiah Kiplangat Koech	Kenya	13:34.54	Q
5	1	Galen Rupp	United States	13:34.91	Q
6	1	Hussain Jamaan Alhamdah	Saudi Arabia	13:35.47	q
7	1	Bilisuma Shugi	Bahrain	13:35.86	q
8	2	Imane Merga	Ethiopia	13:37.96	Q
9	2	Mo Farah	Great Britain & N.I.	13:38.03	Q
10	2	Abera Kuma	Ethiopia	13:38.41	Q
11	2	Eliud Kipchoge	Kenya	13:39.02	Q
12	2	Alistair Cragg	Ireland	13:39.36	Q
13	1	Daniele Meucci	Italy	13:39.90	q
14	2	Amanuel Mesel	Eritrea	13:39.97	q
15	2	Jesús España	Spain	13:40.38	q
16	2	Abraham Kiplimo	Uganda	13:44.09	
17	2	Andrew Bumbalough	United States	13:44.38	
18	1	Javier Carriqueo	Argentina	13:47.51	
19	1	Collis Birmingham	Australia	13:47.88	
20	2	Elroy Gelant	South Africa	13:48.33	
21	1	Mumin Gala	Djibouti	13:48.19	
22	1	Rui Silva	Portugal	13:50.16	
23	2	Ben St Lawrence	Australia	13:51.64	
24	2	Jake Robertson	New Zealand	13:53.57	q
25	2	Geofrey Kusuro	Uganda	13:54.58	
26	1	Craig Mottram	Australia	13:56.60	
27	2	Dejene Regassa	Bahrain	13:56.83	
28	2	Sylvain Rukundo	Rwanda	13:58.92	
29	2	Rabah Aboud	Algeria	14:00.34	
30	1	Moses Kibet	Uganda	14:05.15	
31	1	Goitom Kifle	Eritrea	14:06.42	
32	2	Gérard Gahungu	Burundi	14:09.15	PB
33	2	Kazuya Watanabe	Japan	14:20.64	
34	2	Baek Seung-ho	South Korea	15:01.37	
35	1	Abdishakur Nageye Abdulle	Somalia	15:13.64	PB
36	2	Christian Ngningba	Gabon	18:44.06	PB
	2	Abdullah Abdulaziz Aljoud	Saudi Arabia	DNF	
	1	Francisco Javier Alves	Spain	DNF	
	1	Mounir Miout	Algeria	DNF	
	1	Kenenisa Bekele	Ethiopia	DNS	
	1	Adrian Blincoe	New Zealand	DNS	

=== Final ===
Rank	Name	Nationality	Time	Notes
1st place, gold medalist(s)	Mo Farah	Great Britain & N.I.	13:23.36	
2nd place, silver medalist(s)	Bernard Lagat	United States	13:23.64	
3rd place, bronze medalist(s)	Dejen Gebremeskel	Ethiopia	13:23.92	
4	Isiah Kiplangat Koech	Kenya	13:24.95	
5	Abera Kuma	Ethiopia	13:25.50	
6	Thomas Longosiwa	Kenya	13:26.73	
7	Eliud Kipchoge	Kenya	13:27.27	
8	Bilisuma Shugi	Bahrain	13:27.67	
9	Galen Rupp	United States	13:28.64	
10	Daniele Meucci	Italy	13:29.11	
11	Amanuel Mesel	Eritrea	13:33.99	
12	Jesús España	Spain	13:33.99	
13	Hussain Jamaan Alhamdah	Saudi Arabia	13:34.83	
14	Alistair Cragg	Ireland	13:45.33	
15	Jake Robertson	New Zealand	14:03.09	
	Imane Merga	Ethiopia	13:23.78	DQ

- Ethiopia's Imane Merga was originally awarded the bronze medal, but he was later disqualified for having stepped onto the curb of the running track. His teammate Dejen Gebremeskel was elevated to the bronze medal as a result.
