= Spain at the 2011 World Championships in Athletics =

- WA code: ESP
- National federation: Real Federación Española de Atletismo
- Website: www.rfea.es

in Daegu
- Competitors: 43
- Medals: Gold 0 Silver 0 Bronze 1 Total 1

World Championships in Athletics appearances (overview)
- 1976; 1980; 1983; 1987; 1991; 1993; 1995; 1997; 1999; 2001; 2003; 2005; 2007; 2009; 2011; 2013; 2015; 2017; 2019; 2022; 2023; 2025

Spain competed at the 2011 World Championships in Athletics from August 27 to September 4 in Daegu, South Korea.

== Team selection ==
The Royal Spanish Athletics Federation announced a squad of 49 athletes to compete at the event. The team will be led by medal hopefuls Manuel Olmedo, the reigning European indoor 1500m champion, and Mario Pestano, who is in 4th position on this year’s Discus Throw world list.

The following athletes appeared on the preliminary Entry List, but not on the Official Start List of the specific event, resulting in a total number of 43 competitors:

KEY:	Did not participate	Competed in another event

	Event	Athlete
Men	5000 metres	Sergio Sánchez
Men	20 kilometres walk	Benjamín Sánchez
Men	20 kilometres walk	Juan Manuel Molina
Women	4 x 100 metres relay	Belén Recio
Women	4 x 100 metres relay	Estela García
Women	20 kilometres walk	Júlia Takács

== Medalists ==
The following competitors from South Africa won medals at the Championships

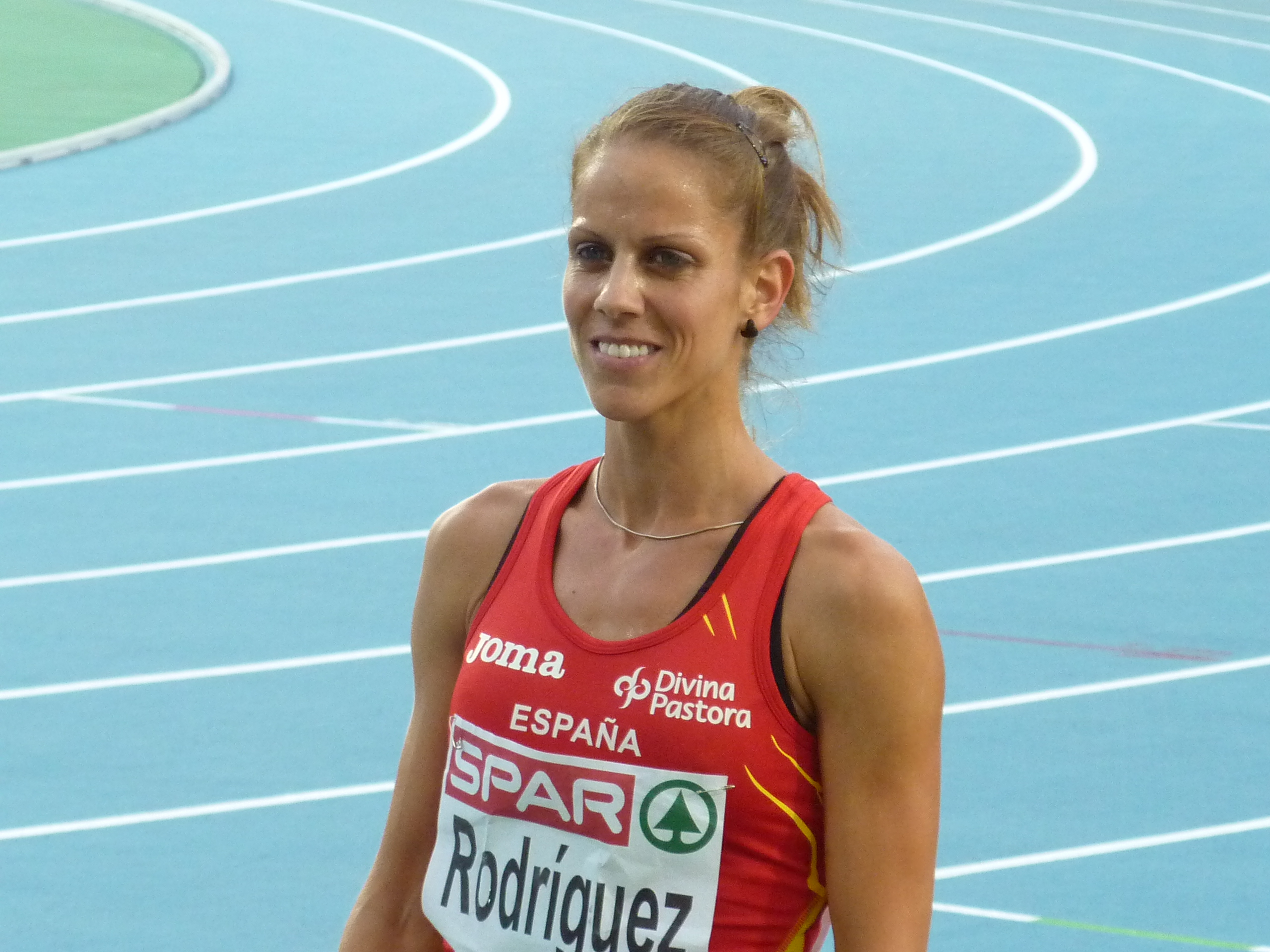
Natalia Rodríguez won a bronze medal in the Women's 1500 metres event (archived from 2010)

Medal	Athlete	Event
Bronze	Natalia Rodríguez	1500 metres

== Results ==
=== Men ===
Athlete	Event	Preliminaries		Heats		Semifinals		Final	
Athlete	Event	Time Width Height	Rank	Time Width Height	Rank	Time Width Height	Rank	Time Width Height	Rank
Ángel David Rodríguez	100 metres			10.37	22 Q	10.49	22	Did not advance	
Kevin López	800 metres			1:46.79	19	1:46.86	19	Did not advance	
Luis Alberto Marco	800 metres			1:46.19	8	1:47.45	21	Did not advance	
Antonio Reina	800 metres			1:46.66	16	1:48.45	23	Did not advance	
Manuel Olmedo	1500 metres			3:41.78	24	3:36.91	2	3:36.33	4
Juan Carlos Higuero	1500 metres			3:40.71	15	3:37.92	10	Did not advance	
Diego Ruiz	1500 metres			3:39.33	4	3:49.26	23	Did not advance	
Jesús España	5000 metres			13:40.38	15			13:33.99	12
Francisco Javier Alves	5000 metres			DNF				Did not advance	
José Manuel Martínez	Marathon							2:17:44	25
Rafael Iglesias	Marathon							2:17:45 SB	26
Pablo Villalobos	Marathon							2:18:12	30
Víctor García	3000 metres steeplechase			8:28.97	17			Did not advance	
Ángel Mullera	3000 metres steeplechase			8:31.83	22			Did not advance	
Tomás Tajadura	3000 metres steeplechase			8:36.23	25			Did not advance	
Miguel Ángel López	20 kilometres walk							1:23:41	17
Paquillo Fernández	20 kilometres walk							DNF	
Jesús Ángel García	50 kilometres walk							DSQ	
Mikel Odriozola	50 kilometres walk							DSQ	
José Ignacio Díaz	50 kilometres walk							DNF	
Eusebio Cáceres	Long jump	7.91	18					Did not advance	
Luis Felipe Méliz	Long jump	7.82	23					Did not advance	
Igor Bychkov	Pole vault	5.50	12 q					NM	
Borja Vivas	Shot put	18.37	26					Did not advance	
Mario Pestano	Discus throw	65.13	3					63.00	11
Frank Casañas	Discus throw	DNS						Did not advance	
Javier Cienfuegos	Hammer throw	67.49	33					Did not advance	

=== Women ===
Athlete	Event	Preliminaries		Heats		Semifinals		Final	
Athlete	Event	Time Width Height	Rank	Time Width Height	Rank	Time Width Height	Rank	Time Width Height	Rank
Natalia Rodríguez	1500 metres			4:10.76	15	4:07.88	2	4:05.87	3rd place, bronze medalist(s)
Nuria Fernández	1500 metres			4:07.29	2	4:09.53	15	Did not advance	
Isabel Macías	1500 metres			4:14.75	30	Did not advance		Did not advance	
Alessandra Aguilar	Marathon							DNF	
Diana Martín	3000 metres steeplechase			10:04.59	25			Did not advance	
Placida A. Martínez; Amparo Cotán; Concepción Montaner; Ruth Beitia	4 x 100 metres relay			46.24	17			Did not advance	
Beatriz Pascual	20 kilometres walk							1:31:46	9
María Vasco	20 kilometres walk							1:32:42	13
María José Poves	20 kilometres walk							DSQ	
Concepción Montaner	Long jump	NM						Did not advance	
Patricia Sarrapio	Triple jump	13.12	34					Did not advance	
Ruth Beitia	High jump	1.92	16					Did not advance	
Ana Pinero	Pole vault	NM						Did not advance	
Berta Castells	Hammer throw	67.74	18					Did not advance	
Mercedes Chilla	Javelin throw	58.34	17					Did not advance	
