= 2011 World Championships in Athletics – Women's 20 kilometres walk =

Women's 20 kilometres walk at the 2011 World Championships
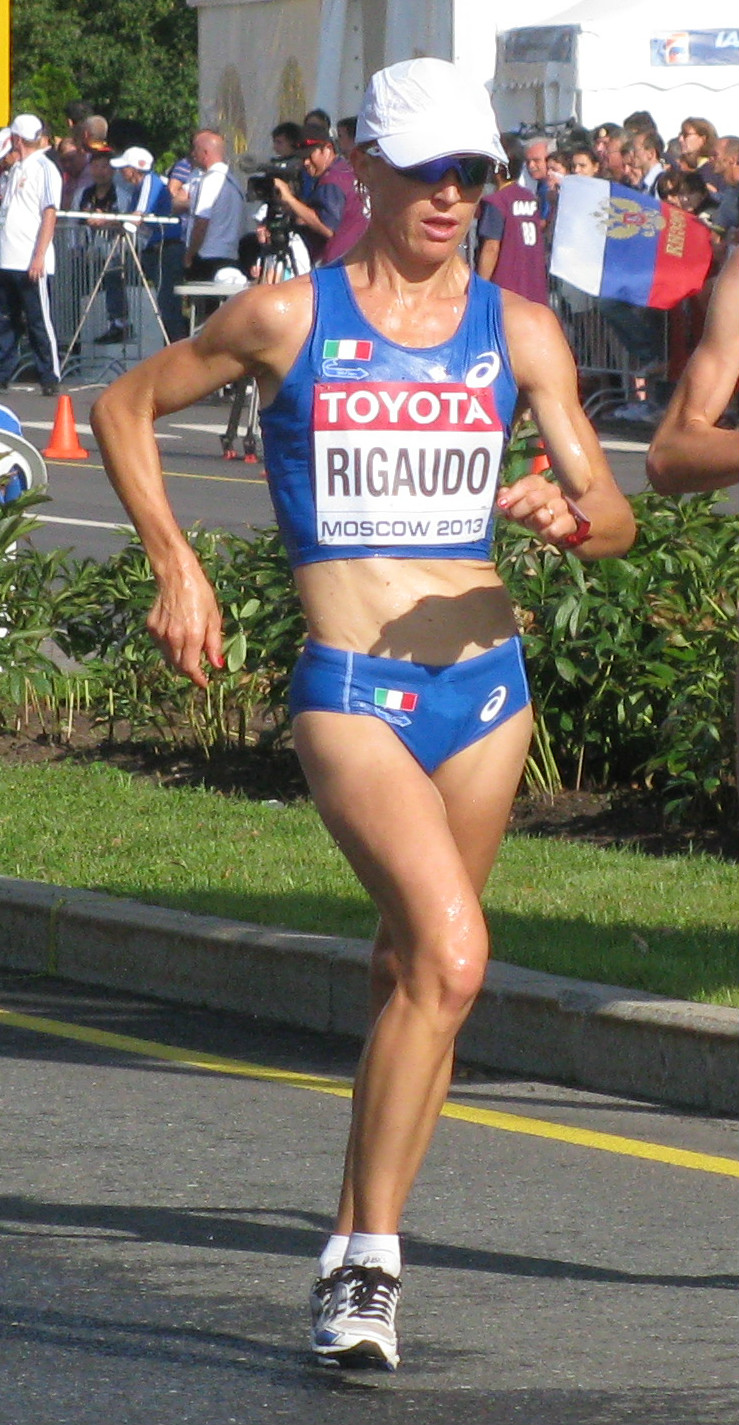
- Elisa Rigaudo, 4th at the arrival af 20km racewalk at Daegu 2011 advanced to bronze, in 2016, and to silver, in 2019, for IAAF decision per Russian doping scandal.
- Venue: Daegu
- Dates: 30 August
- Competitors: 50

Medalists
gold medal	Liu Hong	China
silver medal	Elisa Rigaudo	Italy
bronze medal	Qieyang Shijie	China

The Women's 20 kilometres race walk event at the 2011 World Championships in Athletics was held on a loop course starting and finishing at Gukchae - bosang Memorial Park on August 31.

Olga Kaniskina of Russia looked to continue a series of major victories which had seen her win consecutive world titles (2007, 2009), the 2008 Olympic title and a gold medal at the 2010 European Championships. Two other Russians, Vera Sokolova and Anisya Kirdyapkina, had walked the two fastest times ever for the distance that February and comprised her primary opposition. Outside of the Russians, 2009 medallists Olive Loughnane and Liu Hong were the other major medal contenders. Other entrants were Qieyang Shenjie, Li Yanfei, Beatriz Pascual, Kumi Otoshi and Vera Santos – all of whom were among the fastest walkers that year.

== Records ==
Record	Athlete	Perf.	Location	Date
World record	Vera Sokolova (RUS)	1:25:08	Sochi, Russia	26 February 2011
Championship record	Olimpiada Ivanova (RUS)	1:25:41	Helsinki, Finland	7 August 2005
World leading	Vera Sokolova (RUS)	1:25:08	Sochi, Russia	26 February 2011
African record	Grace Wanjiru Njue (KEN)	1:34:19	Nairobi, Kenya	1 August 2010
Asian record	Yan Wang (CHN)	1:26:22	Guangzhou, China	19 November 2001
NCAC record	Maria Graciela Mendoza (MEX)	1:30:03	Mézidon-Canon, France	2 May 1999
South American record	Miriam Ramón (ECU)	1:31:25	Lima, Peru	7 May 2005
European record	Vera Sokolova (RUS)	1:25:08	Sochi, Russia	26 February 2011
Oceanian record	Jane Saville (AUS)	1:27:44	Naumburg, Germany	2 May 2004

== Qualification standards ==
A time	B time
1:33:30	1:38:00

== Schedule ==
Date	Time	Round
August 31, 2011	09:00	Final

== Results ==
KEY:	q	Fastest non-qualifiers	Q	Qualified	NR	National record	PB	Personal best	SB	Seasonal best

=== Final ===
Elisa Rigaudo became bronze medal on 24 March 2016 (5 years after the event) in 20 km walk (she was 4th) after disqualification of Russian Olga Kaniskina who originally had won the race and silver in March 2019 (8 years after the event) after disqualification of Russian Anisya Kirdyapkina originally second.

Rank	Athlete	Nationality	Time	Notes
1st place, gold medalist(s)	Liu Hong	China	1:30:00	
2nd place, silver medalist(s)	Elisa Rigaudo	Italy	1:30:44	SB
3rd place, bronze medalist(s)	Qieyang Shijie	China	1:31:14	
4	Susana Feitor	Portugal	1:31:26	
5	Ana Cabecinha	Portugal	1:31:36	
6	Kristina Saltanovič	Lithuania	1:31:40	SB
7	Beatriz Pascual	Spain	1:31:46	
8	Inês Henriques	Portugal	1:32:06	
9	Vera Sokolova	Russia	1:32:13	
10	María Vasco	Spain	1:32:42	
11	Gao Ni	China	1:32:49	
12	Regan Lamble	Australia	1:33:38	
13	Olive Loughnane	Ireland	1:34:02	
14	Tatiana Mineeva	Russia	1:34:08	
15	Nastassia Yatsevich	Belarus	1:34:09	
16	Jamy Franco	Guatemala	1:34:36	
17	Kumi Otoshi	Japan	1:34:37	
18	Claire Tallent	Australia	1:34:46	
19	Mayumi Kawasaki	Japan	1:35:03	
20	Johanna Jackson	Great Britain & N.I.	1:35:32	
21	Nadiia Borovska-Prokopuk	Ukraine	1:35:38	
22	Lucie Pelantová	Czech Republic	1:35:45	
23	Jeon Yong-eun	South Korea	1:35:52	SB
24	Claudia Stef	Romania	1:36:55	
25	Agnese Pastare	Latvia	1:37:48	
26	Brigita Virbalytė	Lithuania	1:38:39	
27	Maria Michta	United States	1:38:54	
28	Mária Czaková	Slovakia	1:39:07	
29	Arabelly Orjuela	Colombia	1:39:28	
30	Ingrid Hernández	Colombia	1:39:53	
31	Zuzana Schindlerová	Czech Republic	1:39:57	
32	Marie Polli	Switzerland	1:40:28	
33	Milángela Rosales	Venezuela	1:40:49	
34	Rachel Lavallée Seaman	Canada	1:43:31	
35	Grace Wanjiru	Kenya	1:43:59	
36	Yadira Guamán	Ecuador	1:45:15	
37	Chaima Trabelsi	Tunisia	1:46:29	
	Claudia Balderrama	Bolivia	DSQ	
	María José Poves	Spain	DSQ	
	Viktória Madarász	Hungary	DSQ	
	Neringa Aidietytė	Lithuania	DSQ	
	María Guadalupe Sánchez	Mexico	DSQ	
	Olga Iakovenko	Ukraine	DSQ	
	Sabine Krantz	Germany	DNF	
	Melanie Seeger	Germany	DNF	
	Masumi Fuchise	Japan	DNF	
	Semiha Mutlu	Turkey	DNF	
DSQ	Olga Kaniskina	Russia	~~1:29:42~~	disqualified
DSQ	Anisya Kirdyapkina	Russia	~~1:30:13~~	disqualified
DSQ	Olena Shumkina	Ukraine	~~1:32:17~~	disqualified
