= 2011 World Championships in Athletics – Men's 3000 metres steeplechase =

2011 world championship in athletics

Official Video

The Men's 3000 metres steeplechase event at the 2011 World Championships in Athletics was held at the Daegu Stadium on August 29 & September 1.

The final was a slow race with Ugandans Jacob Araptany and Benjamin Kiplagat controlling the pace, with three Kenyans immediately behind. As the last lap began, Kiplagat fell back but Araptany led until one barrier before the water jump. There Ezekiel Kemboi blasted past, with Brimin Kipruto in tow. Kemboi had such a substantial lead coming off the last barrier, he started celebrating and drifted out to lane 7 where he finished. His post race, shirtless celebration dance was one of the most exuberant in recent memory, rivaling some celebrations normally performed by sprinters. Araptany faded at the finish, passed by Mahiedine Mekhissi-Benabbad for the bronze.

== Medalists ==
Gold	Silver	Bronze
Ezekiel Kemboi; Kenya	Brimin Kipruto; Kenya	Mahiedine Mekhissi-Benabbad; France

== Records ==
World record	Saif Saaeed Shaheen (QAT)	7:53.63	Brussels, Belgium	3 September 2004
Championship record	Ezekiel Kemboi (KEN)	8:00.43	Berlin, Germany	18 August 2009
World leading	Brimin Kiprop Kipruto (KEN)	7:53.64	Monaco	22 July 2011
African record	Brimin Kiprop Kipruto (KEN)	7:53.64	Monaco	22 July 2011
Asian record	Saif Saaeed Shaheen (QAT)	7:53.63	Brussels, Belgium	3 September 2004
North, Central American and Caribbean record	Daniel Lincoln (USA)	8:08.82	Rome, Italy	14 July 2006
South American record	Wander do Prado Moura (BRA)	8:14.41	Mar del Plata, Argentina	22 March 1995
European record	Bouabdellah Tahri (FRA)	8:01.18	Berlin, Germany	18 August 2009
Oceanian record	Peter Renner (NZL)	8:14.05	Koblenz, West Germany	29 August 1984

== Qualification standards ==
A time	B time
8:23.10	8:32.00

== Schedule ==
Date	Time	Round
August 29, 2011	10:40	Heats
September 1, 2011	20:25	Final

== Results ==
KEY:	q	Fastest non-qualifiers	Q	Qualified	NR	National record	PB	Personal best	SB	Seasonal best

=== Heats ===
Qualification: First 4 in each heat (Q) and the next 3 fastest (q) advance to the final.

Rank	Heat	Name	Nationality	Time	Notes
1	2	Ezekiel Kemboi	Kenya	8:10.93	Q
2	2	Ruben Ramolefi	South Africa	8:11.50	Q, NR
3	2	Hamid Ezzine	Morocco	8:11.81	Q, SB
4	2	Nahom Mesfin	Ethiopia	8:12.04	Q, PB
5	2	Bouabdellah Tahri	France	8:13.22	q
6	1	Jacob Araptany	Uganda	8:18.57	Q
7	3	Benjamin Kiplagat	Uganda	8:19.96	Q
8	3	Roba Gari	Ethiopia	8:20.28	Q
9	3	Brimin Kipruto	Kenya	8:21.89	Q
10	3	Alberto Paulo	Portugal	8:22.41	Q, PB
11	3	Abraham Kipkirong Chirchir	Kenya	8:23.09	q, SB
12	1	Mahiedine Mekhissi-Benabbad	France	8:23.71	Q
13	1	Richard Mateelong	Kenya	8:23.76	Q
14	3	Vincent Zouaoui-Dandrieux	France	8:23.79	q
15	1	Ion Luchianov	Moldova	8:23.88	Q, SB
16	2	Ali Ahmed Al-Amri	Saudi Arabia	8:26.75	SB
17	1	Víctor García	Spain	8:28.97	
18	2	Simon Ayeko	Uganda	8:29.02	SB
19	1	Amor Ben Yahia	Tunisia	8:30.02	PB
20	1	Abubaker Ali Kamal	Qatar	8:30.37	
21	2	Jukka Keskisalo	Finland	8:31.52	
22	3	Ángel Mullera	Spain	8:31.83	
23	1	Andrey Farnosov	Russia	8:34.44	
24	2	Daniel Huling	United States	8:34.70	
25	2	Tomás Tajadura	Spain	8:36.23	
26	1	Alex Genest	Canada	8:36.67	
27	1	Steffen Uliczka	Germany	8:37.35	
28	3	Youcef Abdi	Australia	8:38.42	
29	2	Bjørnar Ustad Kristiansen	Norway	8:39.85	
30	3	Ben Bruce	United States	8:39.96	
31	2	Łukasz Parszczyński	Poland	8:44.09	
32	1	Abdelkader Hachlaf	Morocco	8:46.14	
33	1	William Nelson	United States	8:51.20	
34	3	Matthew Hughes	Canada	8:58.52	
	3	Mario Bazán	Peru	DNF	

=== Final ===
Rank	Name	Nationality	Time	Notes
1st place, gold medalist(s)	Ezekiel Kemboi	Kenya	8:14.85	
2nd place, silver medalist(s)	Brimin Kipruto	Kenya	8:16.05	
3rd place, bronze medalist(s)	Mahiedine Mekhissi-Benabbad	France	8:16.09	
4	Bouabdellah Tahri	France	8:17.56	
5	Roba Gari	Ethiopia	8:18.37	
6	Jacob Araptany	Uganda	8:18.67	
7	Richard Mateelong	Kenya	8:19.31	
8	Ion Luchianov	Moldova	8:19.69	SB
9	Hamid Ezzine	Morocco	8:21.97	
10	Benjamin Kiplagat	Uganda	8:22.21	
11	Nahom Mesfin	Ethiopia	8:25.39	
12	Vincent Zouaoui-Dandrieux	France	8:30.39	
13	Ruben Ramolefi	South Africa	8:30.47	
14	Abraham Kipkirong Chirchir	Kenya	8:33.56	
15	Alberto Paulo	Portugal	8:33.84	
