= 2011 World Championships in Athletics – Men's 20 kilometres walk =

Official Video

The Men's 20 kilometres race walk event at the 2011 World Championships in Athletics was held on August 28 on a loop course starting and finishing at Gukchae-bosang Memorial Park in the center of Daegu. Forty-six men started the competition and 27 countries were represented.

Valeriy Borchin entered as the reigning world and 2008 Olympic champion. The athletes on the Chinese and Russian teams led the rankings that year: Wang Zhen and Chu Yafei were the top two, while Borchin, world record holder Vladimir Kanaykin, and Sergey Morozov were in the top six. Wang Hao, Eder Sánchez and Jared Tallent had also performed well that year, as had Kim Hyun-sub, who represented the host nation.

Italian Giorgio Rubino and Japan's Yusuke Suzuki were the early leaders after 5 km. The two remained half a minute ahead at 10 km, but Rubino fell off the pace and was later disqualified for lifting both feet off the ground. Borchin and Wang Zhen made up ground on Suzuki and after 15 km Borchin progressively pulled away to win the race and defend his title.

In the last 5 km Vladimir Kanaykin and Luis Fernando López finished quickly to came away with the silver and bronze medals, respectively. Wang Zhen held on for fourth, with Stanislav Emelyanov fifth kKim Hyun-sub sixth.

At the time, Borchin became only the third walker to win consecutive 20 km world titles, joining Maurizio Damilano and Jefferson Pérez. Although his winning time was not especially quick, the race was undertaken in hot and humid conditions.

On 20 January 2015, Borchin was suspended for eight years from 15 October 2012, with his results between 14 July 2009 and 15 October 2012 (including his 2009 and 2011 World Championship gold medals) being deleted from the records. On the same day, Kanaykin was suspended for life starting from 17 December 2012, with all of his results between 11 February 2011 to 17 December 2012 (including his 2011 world Championship silver medal) being deleted from the records.

López was therefore declared the 2011 World Champion, with his gold medal being Colombia's first ever medal in the history of the Championships, while Wang Zhen was promoted to silver.

Stanislav Yemelyanov of Russia was originally promoted to the bronze medal, but he was suspended for eight years for a second doping offence from 7 April 2017, with all of his results from 2 June 2009 being deleted from the records (including these championships); this suspension was made indefinite on 2 June 2018.

Accordingly, the IAAF informed the Korea Association of Athletics Federations (KAAF) that Kim would be awarded the bronze medal, South Korea's first ever at these Championships.

== Medalists ==
Gold	Silver	Bronze
Luis Fernando López; Colombia	Wang Zhen; China	Kim Hyun-sub; South Korea

== Records ==
World Record	Vladimir Kanaykin (RUS)	1:17:16	Saransk, Russia	29 September 2007
Championship Record	Jefferson Pérez (ECU)	1:17:21	Paris, France	23 August 2003
World Leading	Wang Zhen (CHN)	1:18:30	Taicang, China	22 April 2011
African Record	Hatem Ghoula (TUN)	1:19:02	Eisenhüttenstadt, Germany	10 May 1997
Asian Record	Zhu Hongjun (CHN)	1:17:41	Cixi, China	23 April 2005
North, Central American and Caribbean record	Julio René Martínez (GUA)	1:17:46	Eisenhüttenstadt, Germany	8 May 1999
South American record	Jefferson Pérez (ECU)	1:17:21	Paris, France	23 August 2003
European Record	Vladimir Kanaykin (RUS)	1:17:16	Saransk, Russia	29 September 2007
Oceanian record	Nathan Deakes (AUS)	1:17:33	Cixi, China	23 April 2005

== Qualification standards ==
A time	B time
1:22:30	1:24:00

== Schedule ==
Date	Time	Round
August 28, 2011	09:00	Final

== Results ==
KEY:	q	Fastest non-qualifiers	Q	Qualified	NR	National record	PB	Personal best	SB	Seasonal best

=== Final ===
Rank	Athlete	Nationality	Time	Notes
1st place, gold medalist(s)	Luis Fernando López	Colombia	1:20:38	SB
2nd place, silver medalist(s)	Wang Zhen	China	1:20:54	
3rd place, bronze medalist(s)	Kim Hyun-sub	South Korea	1:21:17	
4	Yūsuke Suzuki	Japan	1:21:39	
5	Alex Schwazer	Italy	1:21:50	SB
6	Erick Barrondo	Guatemala	1:22:08	
7	Chu Yafei	China	1:22:10	
8	Wang Hao	China	1:22:49	
9	Matej Tóth	Slovakia	1:22:55	
10	Eder Sánchez	Mexico	1:23:05	
11	João Vieira	Portugal	1:23:26	
12	Miguel Ángel López	Spain	1:23:41	
13	Anton Kucmin	Slovakia	1:23:57	
14	James Rendón	Colombia	1:24:08	SB
15	Horacio Nava	Mexico	1:24:15	
16	Christopher Linke	Germany	1:24:17	
17	Caio Bonfim	Brazil	1:24:29	
18	Trevor Barron	United States	1:24:33	
19	Rafał Augustyn	Poland	1:24:47	
20	Byun Young-joon	South Korea	1:24:48	
21	Hassanine Sebei	Tunisia	1:25:17	
22	Jared Tallent	Australia	1:25:25	
23	Nazar Kovalenko	Ukraine	1:25:50	
24	Gurmeet Singh	India	1:26:34	
25	Babubhai Panucha	India	1:26:53	
26	David Kimutai	Kenya	1:27:20	SB
27	Yerko Araya	Chile	1:27:47	
28	Hédi Teraoui	Tunisia	1:29:48	
29	Diego Flores	Mexico	1:30:00	
30	Juan Manuel Cano	Argentina	1:30:00	
31	Emerson Hernandez	El Salvador	1:30:48	SB
32	Ronald Quispe	Bolivia	1:32:09	PB
	Moacir Zimmermann	Brazil	DSQ	
	Gustavo Restrepo	Colombia	DSQ	
	Giorgio Rubino	Italy	DSQ	
	Anatole Ibáñez	Sweden	DSQ	
	Paquillo Fernández	Spain	DSQ	
	Adam Rutter	Australia	DNF	
	Mauricio Arteaga	Ecuador	DNF	
	Park Chil-sung	South Korea	DNF	
	Valeriy Borchin	Russia	DSQ	doping ~~(1:19:56)~~
	Vladimir Kanaykin	Russia	DSQ	doping ~~(1:20:27)~~
	Stanislav Emelyanov	Russia	DSQ	doping ~~(1:21:11)~~
	Ruslan Dmytrenko	Ukraine	DSQ	doping ~~(1:21:31)~~
	Sergey Morozov	Russia	DSQ	doping ~~(1:22:37)~~
	Recep Çelik	Turkey	DSQ	doping ~~(1:25:39)~~
