= 2011 World Championships in Athletics – Men's 800 metres =

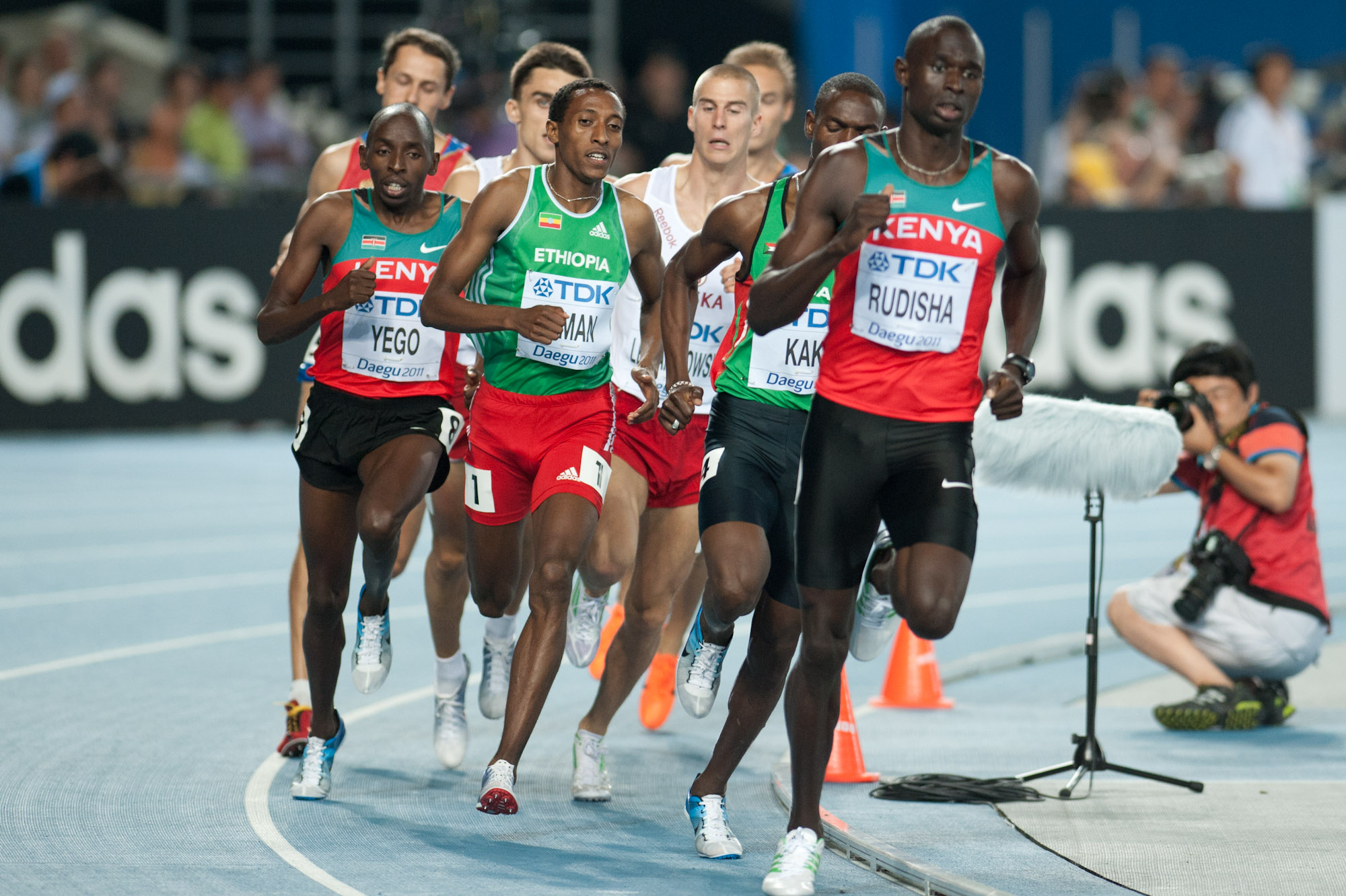
Early in the race at Daegu, David Rudisha ahead of Abubaker Kaki. Eventual bronze medalist Yuriy Borzakovskiy obscured behind Alfred Kirwa Yego

Official Video

The Men's 800 metres at the 2011 World Championships in Athletics was held at the Daegu Stadium on August 27, 28 and 30.

The first semi-final went out fast, with a bunch of finish. While Abubaker Kaki came into the event as one of the favourites, he had to qualify for the final by time as the fastest 3rd place. Both time qualifiers came from the first semi. The second semi was the opposite kind of race as kickers Nick Symmonds and Yuriy Borzakovskiy almost acted as a team to run from the front and slow the pace. The two almost formed a wall down the home stretch that frustrated the runners behind them, achieving the two slowest qualifying times into the final. In the third semi final was favorite David Rudisha taking control of the race, only accelerating enough to make sure nobody passed him.

Rudisha won the gold medal after leading the race from the start. Behind him through most of the last lap, surprisingly was come from behind specialist Borzakovskiy, who was himself out-kicked by Kaki just before the finish for the silver medal.

== Medalists ==
Gold	Silver	Bronze
David Rudisha; Kenya	Abubaker Kaki; Sudan	Yuriy Borzakovskiy; Russia

== Records ==
Prior to the competition, the following records were as follows.

World record	David Rudisha (KEN)	1:41.01	Rieti, Italy	29 August 2010
Championship record	Billy Konchellah (KEN)	1:43.06	Rome, Italy	1 September 1987
World leading	David Rudisha (KEN)	1:42.61	Monaco	22 July 2011
African record	David Rudisha (KEN)	1:41.01	Rieti, Italy	29 August 2010
Asian record	Yusuf Saad Kamel (BHR)	1:42.79	Monaco	29 July 2008
North, Central American and Caribbean record	Johnny Gray (USA)	1:42.60	Koblenz, West Germany	28 August 1985
South American record	Joaquim Cruz (BRA)	1:41.77	Cologne, Germany	26 August 1984
European record	Wilson Kipketer (DEN)	1:41.11	Cologne, Germany	24 August 1997
Oceanian record	Peter Snell (NZL)	1:44.3	Christchurch, New Zealand	3 February 1962

== Qualification standards ==
A time	B time
1:45.40	1:46.30

== Schedule ==
Date	Time	Round
August 27, 2011	12:05	Heats
August 28, 2011	18:00	Semifinals
August 30, 2011	21:00	Final

== Results ==
KEY:	q	Fastest non-qualifiers	Q	Qualified	NR	National record	PB	Personal best	SB	Seasonal best

=== Heats ===
Qualification: First 3 in each heat (Q) and the next 6 fastest (q) advance to the semifinals.

Rank	Heat	Name	Nationality	Time	Notes
1	3	Abubaker Kaki	Sudan	1:44.83	Q
2	3	Mohammed Aman	Ethiopia	1:45.17	Q
3	3	Alfred Kirwa Yego	Kenya	1:45.50	Q
4	5	Kléberson Davide	Brazil	1:46.06	Q
5	5	Andrew Osagie	Great Britain & N.I.	1:46.08	Q
6	2	Yuriy Borzakovskiy	Russia	1:46.14	Q
7	5	Adam Kszczot	Poland	1:46.16	Q
8	3	Luis Alberto Marco	Spain	1:46.19	q
9	4	David Rudisha	Kenya	1:46.29	Q
10	3	Moussa Camara	Mali	1:46.38	q, NR
11	5	Sajjad Moradi	Iran	1:46.39	q
12	1	Nick Symmonds	United States	1:46.54	Q
13	2	Jackson Kivuva	Kenya	1:46.57	Q
14	1	Andreas Bube	Denmark	1:46.64	Q
14	5	Mohammad Al-Azemi	Kuwait	1:46.64	q
16	2	Antonio Manuel Reina	Spain	1:46.66	Q
17	4	Marcin Lewandowski	Poland	1:46.73	Q
17	2	Prince Mumba	Zambia	1:46.73	q
19	1	Kevin López	Spain	1:46.79	Q
19	4	Bram Som	Netherlands	1:46.79	Q
21	4	Mahfoud Brahimi	Algeria	1:46.94	q
22	1	Mohcine El Amine	Morocco	1:46.98	
23	2	Michael Rimmer	Great Britain & N.I.	1:47.11	
24	1	Andrew Ellerton	Canada	1:47.47	
25	5	Julius Mutekanga	Uganda	1:47.54	
26	2	Masato Yokota	Japan	1:47.60	
27	4	Charles Jock	United States	1:47.95	
28	1	Moise Joseph	Haiti	1:48.17	
29	4	Brice Etès	Monaco	1:48.22	SB
30	6	Rafith Rodríguez	Colombia	1:48.26	Q
31	6	Tamás Kazi	Hungary	1:48.29	Q
32	6	Khadevis Robinson	United States	1:48.41	Q
33	6	Daniel Nghipandulwa	Namibia	1:48.79	
34	6	Lutmar Paes	Brazil	1:48.97	
35	4	Edgar Cortez	Nicaragua	1:49.10	NR
36	3	Ashot Hayrapetyan	Armenia	1:50.09	PB
37	5	Farhan Ahmad	Pakistan	1:50.14	PB
38	3	Fernando da Silva	Brazil	1:51.58	
39	6	Ismail Ahmed Ismail	Sudan	1:52.33	
40	6	Derek Mandell	Guam	1:57.11	PB
41	1	Zaw Win Thet	Myanmar	1:58.36	
42	6	Richard Blagg	Gibraltar	1:59.34	PB
43	2	Shifaz Mohamed	Maldives	2:01.05	
	5	Thomas Vandy	Sierra Leone	DNS	

=== Semifinals ===
Qualification: First 2 in each heat (Q) and the next 2 fastest (q) advance to the Final.

Rank	Heat	Name	Nationality	Time	Notes
1	3	David Rudisha	Kenya	1:44.20	Q
2	1	Mohammed Aman	Ethiopia	1:44.57	Q, NR
3	1	Marcin Lewandowski	Poland	1:44.60	Q, SB
4	1	Abubaker Kaki	Sudan	1:44.62	q
5	3	Adam Kszczot	Poland	1:44.81	Q
6	1	Alfred Kirwa Yego	Kenya	1:44.82	q
7	3	Kléberson Davide	Brazil	1:45.06	
8	1	Khadevis Robinson	United States	1:45.27	
9	1	Andreas Bube	Denmark	1:45.48	PB
10	2	Nick Symmonds	United States	1:45.73	Q
10	2	Yuriy Borzakovskiy	Russia	1:45.73	Q
12	2	Jackson Kivuva	Kenya	1:45.97	
13	2	Andrew Osagie	Great Britain & N.I.	1:46.12	
14	1	Sajjad Moradi	Iran	1:46.17	SB
15	3	Rafith Rodríguez	Colombia	1:46.41	
16	2	Tamás Kazi	Hungary	1:46.53	
17	2	Bram Som	Netherlands	1:46.69	
18	3	Mahfoud Brahimi	Algeria	1:46.79	
19	2	Kevin López	Spain	1:46.86	
20	2	Prince Mumba	Zambia	1:47.06	
21	3	Luis Alberto Marco	Spain	1:47.45	
22	3	Moussa Camara	Mali	1:48.15	
23	1	Antonio Manuel Reina	Spain	1:48.45	
	3	Mohammad Al-Azemi	Kuwait	DNF	

=== Final ===
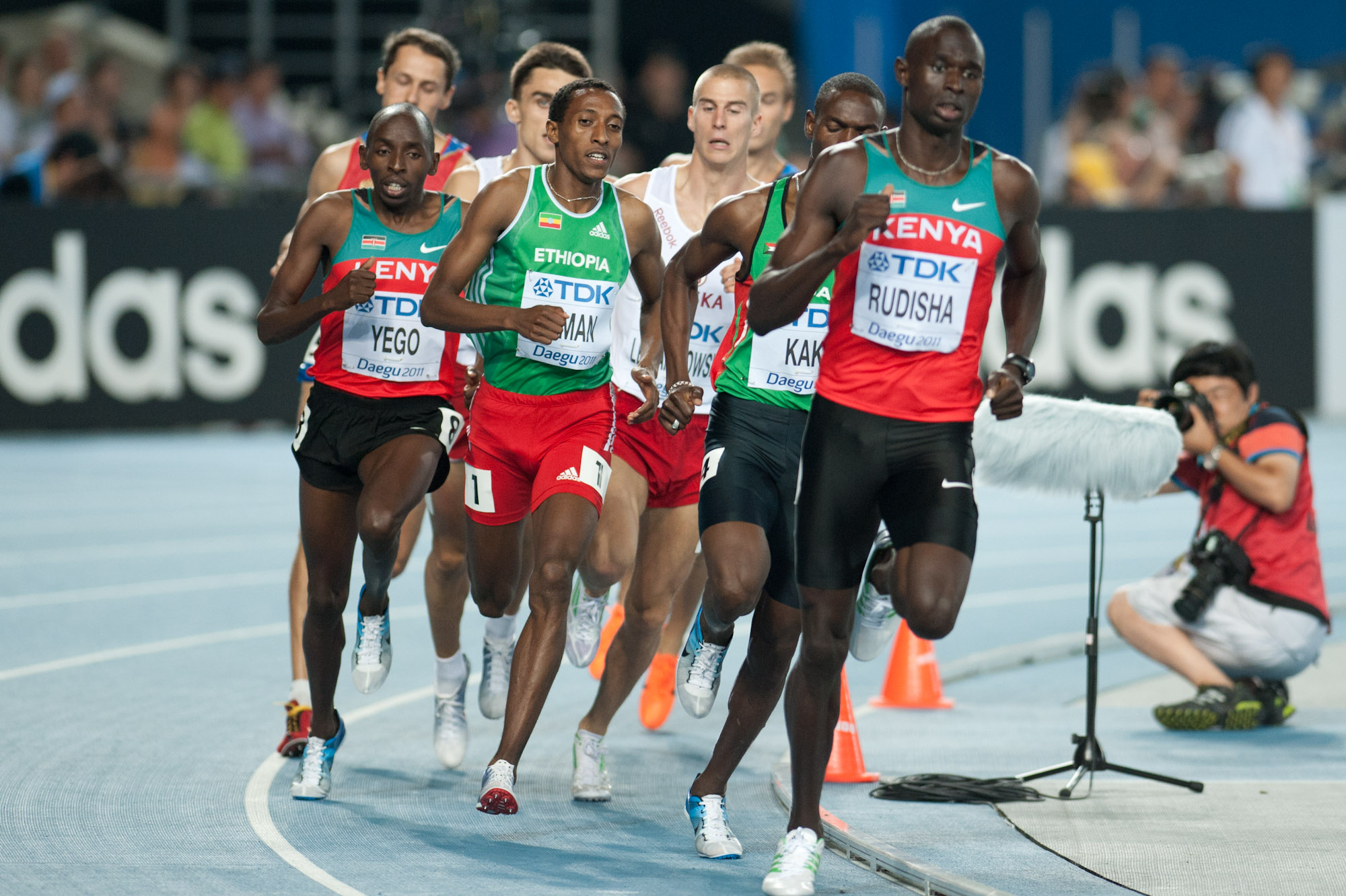
Athletes during the 800 metres final.

Rank	Lane	Name	Nationality	Time	Notes
1st place, gold medalist(s)	6	David Rudisha	Kenya	1:43.91	
2nd place, silver medalist(s)	4	Abubaker Kaki	Sudan	1:44.41	
3rd place, bronze medalist(s)	5	Yuriy Borzakovskiy	Russia	1:44.49	
4	2	Marcin Lewandowski	Poland	1:44.80	
5	3	Nick Symmonds	United States	1:45.12	
6	7	Adam Kszczot	Poland	1:45.25	
7	8	Alfred Kirwa Yego	Kenya	1:45.83	
8	1	Mohammed Aman	Ethiopia	1:45.93	
