= Ukraine at the 2011 World Championships in Athletics =

- WA code: UKR
- National federation: Ukrainian Athletic Federation
- Website: www.uaf.org.ua

in (South Korea) Daegu 27 August 2011 – 4 September 2011
- Competitors: 55 (15 men and 40 women)
- Medals Ranked 11th: Gold 1 Silver 0 Bronze 1 Total 2

World Championships in Athletics appearances
- 1993; 1995; 1997; 1999; 2001; 2003; 2005; 2007; 2009; 2011; 2013; 2015; 2017; 2019; 2022; 2023; 2025

Ukraine competed at the 2011 World Championships in Athletics from August 27 to September 4 in Daegu, South Korea.

== Team selection ==
A team of 59 athletes was announced to represent the country in the event. The team was led by triple jumper Olha Saladuha and the 2008 Olympic Games heptathlon winner Nataliya Dobrynska. The final team on the entry list comprised the names of 57 athletes.

The following athletes appeared on the preliminary Entry List, but not on the Official Start List of the specific events, resulting in a total number of 55 competitors:

KEY:	Did not participate	Competed in another event

	Event	Athlete
Men	Discus throw	Ivan Hryshyn
Men	Javelin throw	Dmytro Kosynskyy
Women	4 × 100 metres relay	Elizaveta Bryzhina
Women	4 × 400 metres relay	Kseniya Karandyuk
Women	4 × 400 metres relay	Hanna Titimets

== Medalists ==
The following competitors from Ukraine won medals at the Championships:

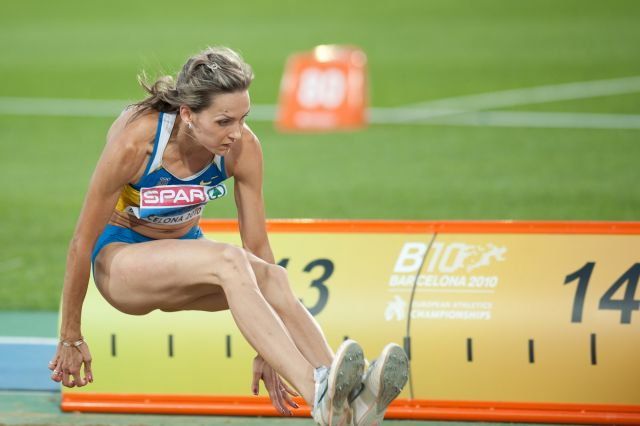
Olha Saladuha won a gold medal in the Women's Triple Jump event (archived from 2010)

Medal	Athlete	Event
Gold	Olha Saladuha	Triple jump
Bronze	Olesya Povh; Nataliya Pohrebnyak; Mariya Ryemyen; Hrystyna Stuy	4 × 100 metres relay

== Results ==
Disqualified due to violation of anti-doping rules

=== Men ===
Athlete	Event	Preliminaries		Heats		Semifinals		Final	
Athlete	Event	Result	Rank	Result	Rank	Result	Rank	Result	Rank
Stanislav Melnykov	400 m hurdles			49.24 SB	11	49.74	18	Did not advance	
Ruslan Dmytrenko	20 kilometres walk							DQ	
Nazar Kovalenko	20 kilometres walk							1:25:50	23
Oleksiy Kazanin	50 kilometres walk							3:56:18 SB	19
Sheryf El-Sheryf	Triple jump	16.81	12					16.38	12
Yevhen Semenenko	Triple jump	15.96	25					Did not advance	
Dmytro Dem'yanyuk	High jump	2.31	10					2.20	12
Bohdan Bondarenko	High jump	2.28	15					Did not advance	
Andriy Protsenko	High jump	2.21	27					Did not advance	
Denys Yurchenko	Pole vault	5.35	22					Did not advance	
Andriy Semenov	Shot put	19.45	21					Did not advance	
Olexiy Sokyrskiyy	Hammer throw	73.81	17					Did not advance	
Roman Avramenko	Javelin throw	81.46	9					82.51	6
Oleksandr Pyatnytsya	Javelin throw	73.56	29					Did not advance	

Decathlon

Athlete	Event	Results	Points	Rank
Oleksiy Kasyanov	100 m	10.75 SB	917	5
Oleksiy Kasyanov	Long jump	7.59 SB	957	2
Oleksiy Kasyanov	Shot put	14.43 SB	755	18
Oleksiy Kasyanov	High jump	1.99	794	15
Oleksiy Kasyanov	400 m	48.46	887	6
Oleksiy Kasyanov	110 m hurdles	14.65	892	14
Oleksiy Kasyanov	Discus throw	43.74	741	16
Oleksiy Kasyanov	Pole vault	4.70	819	16
Oleksiy Kasyanov	Javelin throw	52.16 SB	621	21
Oleksiy Kasyanov	1500 m	4:29.35	749	8
Total			8132	12

=== Women ===
Athlete	Event	Preliminaries		Heats		Semifinals		Final	
Athlete	Event	Result	Rank	Result	Rank	Result	Rank	Result	Rank
Olesya Povh	100 metres			11.25	14 Q	11.48	13	Did not advance	
Nataliya Pohrebnyak	100 metres			11.33	20	Did not advance			
Hrystyna Stuy	200 metres			22.92 SB	13	22.79 PB	6	23.02	7
Mariya Ryemyen	200 metres			22.77	8	22.94	10	Did not advance	
Yelizaveta Bryzhina	200 metres			23.70	28 q	DNF		Did not advance	
Antonina Yefremova	400 metres			DQ		DQ		Did not advance	
Nataliya Pyhyda	400 metres			51.67	10 Q	51.61	12	Did not advance	
Kseniya Karandyuk	400 metres			54.10	27	Did not advance			
Liliya Lobanova	800 metres			2:02.84	21	1:59.38	8	Did not advance	
Yuliya Krevsun	800 metres			2:01.88	17	2:05.37	22	Did not advance	
Tetiana Petlyuk	800 metres			DQ		Did not advance			
Nataliya Tobias	1500 metres			DQ		DQ		DQ	
Anna Mishchenko	1500 metres			4:09.02	9	4:09.78	15	Did not advance	
Anzhelika Shevchenko	1500 metres			DQ		Did not advance			
Tetyana Hamera-Shmyrko	Marathon							DQ	
Olena Burkovska	Marathon							2:34:21	20
Tetyana Holovchenko	Marathon							2:39:25 SB	33
Yuliya Ruban	Marathon							DNF	
Kateryna Stetsenko	Marathon							DNF	
Anastasiya Rabchenyuk	400 m hurdles			55.08	5	55.06	8	54.18 SB	5
Hanna Yaroshchuk	400 m hurdles			55.99	15	55.09	10	Did not advance	
Hanna Titimets	400 m hurdles			55.40	10	55.82	14	Did not advance	
Svitlana Shmidt	3000 metres steeplechase			10:14.16	27			Did not advance	
Olesya Povh; Nataliya Pohrebnyak; Mariya Ryemyen; Hrystyna Stuy	4 × 100 metres relay			42.63 SB	4			42.51 SB	3rd place, bronze medalist(s)
Nataliya Pyhyda; Anastasiya Rabchenyuk; Hanna Yaroshchuk; Antonina Yefremova; Olha Zavhorodnya (heat)	4 × 400 metres relay			DQ				DQ	
Olena Shumkina	20 kilometres walk							DQ	
Nadiia Borovska-Prokopuk	20 kilometres walk							1:35:38	21
Olha Iakovenko	20 kilometres walk							DQ	
Viktoriya Rybalko	Long jump	6.45	14					Did not advance	
Olha Saladukha	Triple jump	14.40	4					14.94	1st place, gold medalist(s)
Natalya Tomashevska-Yastrebova	Triple jump	14.21	10					14.12	9
Ruslana Tsykhotska	Triple jump	13.28	32					Did not advance	
Vita Styopina	High jump	1.92	17					Did not advance	
Oksana Okuneva	High jump	1.89	18					Did not advance	
Natalya Fokina-Semenova	Discus throw	58.27	15					Did not advance	
Kateryna Karsak	Discus throw	57.54	19					Did not advance	
Nataliya Zolotukhina	Hammer throw	67.57	18					Did not advance	
Vira Rebryk	Javelin throw	58.50	15					Did not advance	

Heptathlon

Athlete	Event	Results	Points	Rank
Nataliya Dobrynska	100 m hurdles	13.43 PB	1060	8
Nataliya Dobrynska	High jump	1.83 SB	1016	4
Nataliya Dobrynska	Shot put	16.14 SB	937	2
Nataliya Dobrynska	200 m	25.35	855	15
Nataliya Dobrynska	Long jump	6.18	905	10
Nataliya Dobrynska	Javelin throw	48.00 SB	821	6
Nataliya Dobrynska	800 m	2:11.34 PB	945	6
Total			6539 SB	4

Athlete	Event	Results	Points	Rank
Lyudmyla Yosypenko	100 m hurdles	DQ		
Lyudmyla Yosypenko	High jump	DQ		
Lyudmyla Yosypenko	Shot put	DQ		
Lyudmyla Yosypenko	200 m	DQ		
Lyudmyla Yosypenko	Long jump	DQ		
Lyudmyla Yosypenko	Javelin throw	DQ		
Lyudmyla Yosypenko	800 m	DQ		
Total			DQ	

Athlete	Event	Results	Points	Rank
Alina Fyodorova	100 m hurdles	14.06 PB	970	23
Alina Fyodorova	High jump	1.80	978	12
Alina Fyodorova	Shot put	14.18	14.18	12
Alina Fyodorova	200 m	25.35 PB	855	15
Alina Fyodorova	Long jump	5.98 PB	843	19
Alina Fyodorova	Javelin throw	37.13 PB	612	23
Alina Fyodorova	800 m	2:18.51	844	20
Total			5908	19
