= 2011 World Championships in Athletics – Women's 3000 metres steeplechase =

Official Video

The women's 3000 metres steeplechase event at the 2011 World Championships in Athletics was held at the Daegu Stadium on August 27 and 30. The winning margin was 5.19 seconds which as of 2024 is the only time the women's 3000 metres steeplechase has been won by more than five seconds at these championships.

Milcah Chemos Cheywa was the pre-race favourite, having set the fastest time that year and gone undefeated on the Diamond League. Kenya also entered Mercy Wanjiku Njoroge and Lydia Jebet Rotich, the third and fourth fastest steeplechasers of the season. The other principal medal contenders were Sofia Assefa, second in the Diamond League rankings, and Yuliya Zarudneva (the 2009 runner-up). The 2008 Olympic champion Gulnara Galkina had failed to qualify, while the defending world champion Marta Domínguez was absent due to pregnancy.

On March 24, 2016, the Court of Arbitration for Sport disqualified Yuliya Zaripova's results from July 20, 2011, to July 25, 2013, which included the World Championships.

This resulted in the winning margin becoming 5.19 seconds. As of 2024, this is the only time this race has been won by more than five seconds at these championships.

== Medalists ==
Gold	Silver	Bronze
	Habiba Ghribi; Tunisia	Milcah Chemos Cheywa; Kenya

== Records ==
World record	Gulnara Samitova-Galkina (RUS)	8:58.81	Beijing, China	17 August 2008
Championship record	Yekaterina Volkova (RUS)	9:06.57	Osaka, Japan	27 August 2007
World leading	Milcah Chemos Cheywa (KEN)	9:12.89	Rome, Italy	26 May 2011
African record	Eunice Jepkorir (KEN)	9:07.41	Beijing, China	17 August 2008
Asian record	Liu Nian (CHN)	9:26.25	Wuhan, China	2 November 2007
North, Central American and Caribbean record	Jennifer Barringer (USA)	9:12.50	Berlin, Germany	17 August 2009
South American record	Sabine Heitling (BRA)	9:41.22	London, United Kingdom	25 July 2009
European record	Gulnara Samitova-Galkina (RUS)	8:58.81	Beijing, China	17 August 2008
Oceanian record	Donna MacFarlane (AUS)	9:18.35	Oslo, Norway	6 June 2008

== Qualification standards ==
A time	B time
9:43.00	9:50.00

== Schedule ==
Date	Time	Round
August 27, 2011	10:35	Heats
August 30, 2011	21:20	Final

== Results ==
KEY:	q	Fastest non-qualifiers	Q	Qualified	NR	National record	PB	Personal best	SB	Seasonal best

=== Heats ===
Qualification: First 4 in each heat (Q) and the next 3 fastest (q) advance to the final.

Rank	Heat	Name	Nationality	Time	Notes
~~1~~	1	Binnaz Uslu	Turkey	~~9:24.06~~	~~NR~~, Doping
1	1	Habiba Ghribi	Tunisia	9:24.56	Q
2	1	Mercy Wanjiku	Kenya	9:24.95	Q
3	1	Hanane Ouhaddou	Morocco	9:25.96	Q, SB
4	1	Birtukan Fente	Ethiopia	9:28.82	q
5	2	Sofia Assefa	Ethiopia	9:32.48	Q
6	3	Milcah Chemos Cheywa	Kenya	9:35.61	Q
~~8~~	3	Yuliya Zarudneva Zaripova	Russia	~~9:35.80~~	Doping
7	3	Gesa Felicitas Krause	Germany	9:35.83	Q, PB
8	2	Lydia Rotich	Kenya	9:36.70	Q
9	3	Birtukan Adamu	Ethiopia	9:37.31	Q
10	3	Barbara Parker	Great Britain & N.I.	9:38.21	q
11	2	Emma Coburn	United States	9:38.42	Q
12	2	Lyubov Kharlamova	Russia	9:40.04	q
13	1	Fionnuala Britton	Ireland	9:41.17	
14	3	Beverly Ramos	Puerto Rico	9:45.50	
15	1	Bridget Franek	United States	9:43.09	
16	2	Cristina Casandra	Romania	9:51.00	
17	1	Korene Hinds	Jamaica	9:52.11	
18	3	Stephanie Garcia	United States	9:53.47	
19	3	Stephanie Reilly	Ireland	9:55.49	
20	1	Jana Sussmann	Germany	9:59.53	
21	3	Sandra Eriksson	Finland	10:03.20	
22	1	Diana Martín	Spain	10:04.59	
23	2	Gülcan Mingir	Turkey	10:04.83	
24	2	Minori Hayakari	Japan	10:05.34	
25	1	Ángela Figueroa	Colombia	10:06.00	
26	2	Salima El Ouali Alami	Morocco	10:07.71	
27	2	Marcela Lustigová	Czech Republic	10:12.54	
28	3	Svitlana Shmidt	Ukraine	10:14.16	
29	3	Iríni Kokkinaríou	Greece	10:15.18	
	2	Mardrea Hyman	Jamaica	DNF	
	2	Sara Moreira	Portugal	DQ	Drug Test

=== Final ===
Rank	Name	Nationality	Time	Notes
~~1~~	Yuliya Zarudneva Zaripova	Russia	~~9:07.03~~	~~WL~~, Doping
1st place, gold medalist(s)	Habiba Ghribi	Tunisia	9:11.97	NR
2nd place, silver medalist(s)	Milcah Chemos Cheywa	Kenya	9:17.16	
3rd place, bronze medalist(s)	Mercy Wanjiku	Kenya	9:17.88	
4	Lydia Rotich	Kenya	9:25.74	
5	Sofia Assefa	Ethiopia	9:28.24	
~~7~~	Binnaz Uslu	Turkey	~~9:31.06~~	Doping
6	Hanane Ouhaddou	Morocco	9:32.36	
7	Gesa Felicitas Krause	Germany	9:32.74	PB
8	Birtukan Fente	Ethiopia	9:36.81	
9	Lyubov Kharlamova	Russia	9:44.14	
10	Emma Coburn	United States	9:51.40	
11	Barbara Parker	Great Britain & N.I.	9:56.66	
12	Birtukan Adamu	Ethiopia	10:05.10	
	Sara Moreira	Portugal	DQ	Doping
