= Portugal at the 2011 World Championships in Athletics =

- WA code: POR
- National federation: Federação Portuguesa de Atletismo
- Website: www.fpatletismo.pt

in Daegu
- Competitors: 25
- Medals: Gold 0 Silver 0 Bronze 0 Total 0

World Championships in Athletics appearances
- 1980; 1983; 1987; 1991; 1993; 1995; 1997; 1999; 2001; 2003; 2005; 2007; 2009; 2011; 2013; 2015; 2017; 2019; 2022; 2023; 2025

Portugal competed at the 2011 World Championships in Athletics from August 27 to September 4 in Daegu, South Korea. The Portuguese Athletics Federation announced a squad of 25 athletes (12 men and 13 women).

Among the medal hopefuls are Nelson Évora (reigning Olympic champion in men's triple jump), Rui Silva (1500-metre bronze medalist at the 2004 Olympic Games and 2005 World Championships), Jéssica Augusto (2010 European cross-country champion and 10,000-metre bronze medalist at the 2010 European Championships), Sara Moreira (5000-metre bronze medalist at the 2010 European Championships), and Susana Feitor (20-km walk bronze medalist at the 2005 World Championships), who will compete for an all-time record 11th consecutive time at these Championships.

== Results ==
=== Men ===
| Athlete | Event | Preliminaries | | Heats | | Semifinals | | Final | |
| Athlete | Event | Time Width Height | Rank | Time Width Height | Rank | Time Width Height | Rank | Time Width Height | Rank |
|---|---|---|---|---|---|---|---|---|---|
| Arnaldo Abrantes | 200 metres | | | 21.10 | 40 | Did not qualify | | | |
| Rui Silva | 5000 metres | | | 13:50.16 | 22 | | | Did not qualify | |
| Rui Silva | 10,000 metres | | | | | | | 28:48.62 | 11 |
| Jorge Paula | 400 m hurdles | | | 49.82 | =21 | Did not qualify | | | |
| Alberto Paulo | 3000 metres steeplechase | | | 8:22.41 Q (PB) | 10 | | | 8:33.84 | 15 |
| Arnaldo Abrantes; Ricardo Monteiro; João Ferreira; Yazaldes Nascimento | 4 × 100 metres relay | | | 39.09 (SB) | 15 | | | Did not qualify | |
| João Vieira | 20 kilometres walk | | | | | | | 1:23:26 | 16 |
| Marcos Chuva | Long jump | 8.10 q | 6 | | | | | 8.05 | 10 |
| Nelson Évora | Triple jump | 17.20 Q | 2 | | | | | 17.35 | 5 |
| Edi Maia | Pole vault | NM | – | | | | | Did not qualify | |
| Marco Fortes | Shot put | 20.32 q | 9 | | | | | 20.83 | 6 |

=== Women ===
| Athlete | Event | Preliminaries | | Heats | | Semifinals | | Final | |
| Athlete | Event | Time Width Height | Rank | Time Width Height | Rank | Time Width Height | Rank | Time Width Height | Rank |
|---|---|---|---|---|---|---|---|---|---|
| Ana Dulce Félix | 10,000 metres | | | | | | | 31:37.03 | 8 |
| Jéssica Augusto | 10,000 metres | | | | | | | 32:06.68 (SB) | 10 |
| Marisa Barros | Marathon | | | | | | | 2:30:29 | 9 |
| Vera Barbosa | 400 m hurdles | | | 56.31 q | 21 | 57.70 | 24 | Did not qualify | |
| Sara Moreira | 3000 metres steeplechase | | | 9:36.97 Q | 11 | | | 9:47.87 | 12 |
| Ana Cabecinha | 20 kilometres walk | | | | | | | 1:31:36 | 7 |
| Inês Henriques | 20 kilometres walk | | | | | | | 1:32:06 | 10 |
| Susana Feitor | 20 kilometres walk | | | | | | | 1:31:26 | 6 |
| Naide Gomes | Long jump | 6.76 Q | 5 | | | | | 6.26 | 10 |
| Patrícia Mamona | Triple jump | 13.59 | 27 | | | | | Did not qualify | |
| Maria Eleonor Tavares | Pole vault | 4.25 | 25 | | | | | Did not qualify | |
| Vânia Silva | Hammer throw | 65.40 | 25 | | | | | Did not qualify | |
