= Mahfoud Brahimi =

Algerian middle-distance runner

Personal information
- Born: 24 February 1985 (age 41)

Sport
- Country: Algeria
- Sport: Track and field
- Event: Middle-distance running
- Updated on 28 September 2015

Mahfoud Brahimi (born 24 February 1985) is a male Algerian middle-distance runner. He competed in the 800 metres event at the 2011 World Championships in Athletics in Seoul, South Korea.

== See also ==
- Algeria at the 2011 World Championships in Athletics
