= 2011 World Championships in Athletics – Women's marathon =

Official Video

The Women's marathon at the 2011 World Championships in Athletics was held starting and finishing at Gukchae – bosang Memorial Park on 27 August. A total of 54 runners began the race and twenty three nations were represented.

The fastest entrant that year was Edna Kiplagat of Kenya, who had won the 2010 New York Marathon and finished third in London in April. Her compatriot Priscah Jeptoo (2011 Paris champion) and Aselefech Mergia of Ethiopia (winner in Dubai) completed the three fastest athletes to start the race. Other fast Ethiopian and Kenyan entrants included Sharon Cherop, Bezunesh Bekele and Atsede Baysa. The 2009 runner-up Yoshimi Ozaki headed the Japanese team. Other major participants were Sweden's Isabella Andersson and Chinese duo Zhou Chunxiu and Zhu Xiaolin. The reigning champion Bai Xue was absent, as were the 2008 Olympic champion Constantina Diṭă-Tomescu and the two fastest runners that year (Mary Keitany and Liliya Shobukhova).

A large group of 19 runners remained in the leading pack after 30 km, but a Kenyan trio of Kiplagat, Jeptoo and Cherop pulled away from the group after this point. With some 5 km to go, Kiplagat and Cherop collided at the drinks station. Kiplagat fell to the ground. Cherop slowed down and waited for her teammate until they both resumed running. It was Kiplagat who went on to take the gold medal for Kenya (the first medal of the championships), while Jeptoo and Cherop finished in second and third. This was the first time that any country had won all the medals in a marathon at either the World Championships or the Olympic Games. Bezunesh Bekele crossed the line for fourth place seven seconds later and Japan's Yukiko Akaba completed the top five.

The competition also served as the IAAF World Marathon Cup team race, which was decided by totalling the times of each nation's three fastest runners. The Kenyan women easily won the title, while China and Ethiopia were the silver and bronze medallists, respectively. This result represented the first time that the Japanese women had failed to win a team medal, since the competition was incorporated at the 1997 World Championships.

== Medalists ==
Gold	Silver	Bronze
Edna Kiplagat; Kenya	Priscah Jeptoo; Kenya	Sharon Cherop; Kenya

== Records ==
Prior to the competition, the records were as follows:

World record	Paula Radcliffe (GBR)	2:15:25	London, Great Britain	13 April 2003
Championship record	Paula Radcliffe (GBR)	2:20:57	Helsinki, Finland	14 August 2005
World Leading	Mary Keitany (KEN)	2:19:19	London, Great Britain	17 April 2011
African Record	Catherine Ndereba (KEN)	2:18:47	Chicago, IL, United States	7 October 2001
Asian Record	Mizuki Noguchi (JPN)	2:19:12	Berlin, Germany	25 September 2005
North, Central American and Caribbean record	Deena Kastor (USA)	2:19:36	London, Great Britain	23 April 2006
South American record	Carmem de Oliveira (BRA)	2:27:41	Boston, MA, United States	18 April 1994
European Record	Paula Radcliffe (GBR)	2:15:25	London, Great Britain	13 April 2003
Oceanian record	Benita Willis (AUS)	2:22:36	Chicago, IL, United States	22 October 2006

== Qualification standards ==
A time	B time
2:43:00

== Schedule ==
Date	Time	Round
27 August 2011	09:00	Final

== Results ==
KEY:	NR	National record	PB	Personal best	SB	Seasonal best

=== Final ===
Rank	Athlete	Nationality	Time	Notes
1st place, gold medalist(s)	Edna Kiplagat	Kenya	2:28:43	
2nd place, silver medalist(s)	Priscah Jeptoo	Kenya	2:29:00	
3rd place, bronze medalist(s)	Sharon Cherop	Kenya	2:29:14	SB
4	Bezunesh Bekele	Ethiopia	2:29:21	
5	Yukiko Akaba	Japan	2:29:35	
6	Zhou Chunxiu	China	2:29:58	
7	Isabellah Andersson	Sweden	2:30:13	
8	Wang Jiali	China	2:30:25	
9	Marisa Barros	Portugal	2:30:29	
10	Remi Nakazato	Japan	2:30:52	
11	Chen Rong	China	2:31:11	
12	Aberu Kebede	Ethiopia	2:31:22	
13	Irene Jerotich Kosgei	Kenya	2:31:29	SB
14	Atsede Baysa	Ethiopia	2:31:37	
15	Tetyana Hamera-Shmyrko	Ukraine	2:31:58	
16	Jia Chaofeng	China	2:31:58	
17	Tera Moody	United States	2:32:04	SB
18	Yoshimi Ozaki	Japan	2:32:31	
19	Azusa Nojiri	Japan	2:33:42	
20	Lishan Dula	Bahrain	2:33:47	
21	Olena Burkovska	Ukraine	2:34:21	
22	Mai Ito	Japan	2:35:16	
23	Margarita Plaksina	Russia	2:35:39	
24	Susan Partridge	Great Britain & N.I.	2:35:57	
25	Diana Lobačevskė	Lithuania	2:36:05	SB
26	Wang Xueqin	China	2:36:10	
27	Lisa Stublić	Croatia	2:36:41	
28	Kim Sung-eun	South Korea	2:37:05	SB
29	Caroline Rotich	Kenya	2:37:07	SB
30	Kathy Newberry	United States	2:37:28	SB
31	René Kalmer	South Africa	2:38:16	
32	Alisa McKaig	United States	2:38:23	SB
33	Tetyana Holovchenko	Ukraine	2:39:25	SB
34	Lee Sook-Jung	South Korea	2:40:23	
35	Chung Yun-Hee	South Korea	2:42:28	
36	Bahar Doğan	Turkey	2:42:56	
37	Annerien van Schalkwyk	South Africa	2:43:59	SB
38	Colleen De Reuck	United States	2:44:35	SB
39	Luvsanlkhündegiin Otgonbayar	Mongolia	2:45:58	
40	Zoila Gómez	United States	2:46:44	SB
41	Judith Toribio	Peru	2:47:21	
42	Alyson Dixon	Great Britain & N.I.	2:50:51	
43	Park Jun-Sook	South Korea	3:03:34	
44	Choi Bo-ra	South Korea	3:10:06	
45	Moleboheng Mafata	Lesotho	3:28:30	SB
46	Shariska Winterdal	Aruba	3:49:48	SB
	Dire Tune	Ethiopia	DSQ	
	Lucia Kimani	Bosnia and Herzegovina	DNF	
	Alessandra Aguilar	Spain	DNF	
	Aselefech Mergia	Ethiopia	DNF	
	Jemena Misayauri	Peru	DNF	
	Epiphanie Nyirabarame	Rwanda	DNF	
	Yuliya Ruban	Ukraine	DNF	
	Kateryna Stetsenko	Ukraine	DNF	
	Tanith Maxwell	South Africa	DNS	

== See also ==
- 2011 World Marathon Cup
