= 2011 World Championships in Athletics – Men's 1500 metres =

Official video

The Men's 1500 metres at the 2011 World Championships in Athletics was held at the Daegu Stadium on August 30 and September 1 & 3. The winning margin was 0.23 seconds.

In the heats, Mehdi Baala, who has a history of this sort of incident, fell flat on his face as the final sprint began. He was eventually advanced by the referees to the semi-finals, where he qualified for the final.

The first semi-final went out slowly and was a strategic race with a bunch finish. Defending champion Yusuf Saad Kamel finished 6th in that semi and failed to make the time qualifier. The second semi went out on a decidedly faster pace bringing the time qualifiers along with the automatic qualifiers. Previous silver medalist Deresse Mekonnen was left behind in the final kick. With Bernard Lagat opting to run the 5,000 metres, no returning medalists made the final, though all current Olympic medalists did make the final.

The final went out at 4 minute mile pace, with Nick Willis leading Matthew Centrowitz and the pack through a 60-second 400, slowing to almost 2:02 by 800. Shortly after that, the Kenyans Asbel Kiprop and Silas Kiplagat moved to the front, chased by Mekonnen Gebremedhin and much of the pack swallowed the early leaders. Centrowitz stepped to the side and followed. As the pack tried to jockey for position, Kiprop refused to relinquish the lead along the rail, even as teammate Kiplagat took the lead on the outside during the backstretch. Kiprop and then Kiplagat continued that way to the finish. Abdalaati Iguider stayed a step behind Kiprop and was in third coming down the home stretch. As he faded, Centrowitz, who had come around the outside followed by Manuel Olmedo moved back up to finish third.

== Medalists ==
Gold	Silver	Bronze
Asbel Kiprop; Kenya	Silas Kiplagat; Kenya	Matthew Centrowitz; United States

== Records ==
World record	Hicham El Guerrouj (MAR)	3:26.00	Rome, Italy	14 July 1998
Championship record	Hicham El Guerrouj (MAR)	3:27.65	Seville, Spain	14 August 1999
World Leading	Silas Kiplagat (KEN)	3:30.47	Monaco	22 July 2011
African record	Hicham El Guerrouj (MAR)	3:26.00	Rome, Italy	14 July 1998
Asian record	Rashid Ramzi (BHR)	3:29.14	Rome, Italy	14 July 2006
North, Central American and Caribbean record	Bernard Lagat (USA)	3:29.30	Rieti, Italy	28 August 2005
South American record	Hudson de Souza (BRA)	3:33.25	Rieti, Italy	28 August 2005
European record	Fermín Cacho (ESP)	3:28.95	Zürich, Switzerland	13 August 1997
Oceanian record	Ryan Gregson (AUS)	3:31.06	Monaco	22 July 2010

== Qualification standards ==
A time	B time
3:35.00	3:38.00

== Schedule ==
Date	Time	Round
August 30, 2011	11:20	Heats
September 1, 2011	19:55	Semifinals
September 3, 2011	20:15	Final

== Results ==
KEY:	q	Fastest non-qualifiers	Q	Qualified	NR	National record	PB	Personal best	SB	Seasonal best

=== Heats ===
Qualification: First 6 in each heat (Q) and the next 6 fastest (q) advance to the semifinals.

Rank	Heat	Name	Nationality	Time	Notes
1	1	Daniel Kipchirchir Komen	Kenya	3:38.54	Q
2	1	Nick Willis	New Zealand	3:39.24	Q
3	1	Yoann Kowal	France	3:39.33	Q
4	1	Diego Ruiz	Spain	3:39.33	Q
5	1	Mohamed Moustaoui	Morocco	3:39.35	Q
6	1	Matthew Centrowitz	United States	3:39.46	Q
7	1	Chaminda Wijekoon	Sri Lanka	3:39.61	q, NR
8	3	Amine Laâlou	Morocco	3:39.86	Q
9	1	Ryan Gregson	Australia	3:40.01	q
10	3	Deresse Mekonnen	Ethiopia	3:40.08	Q
11	3	Silas Kiplagat	Kenya	3:40.13	Q
12	3	Taoufik Makhloufi	Algeria	3:40.15	Q
13	3	Yusuf Saad Kamel	Bahrain	3:40.27	Q, SB
14	3	Ciaran O'Lionaird	Ireland	3:40.41	Q
15	3	Juan Carlos Higuero	Spain	3:40.71	q
16	3	Leonel Manzano	United States	3:40.77	q
17	3	Geoffrey Martinson	Canada	3:40.98	q
18	1	Zebene Alemayehu	Ethiopia	3:41.08	q
19	1	James Shane	Great Britain & N.I.	3:41.17	
20	2	Asbel Kiprop	Kenya	3:41.22	Q
21	2	Mekonnen Gebremedhin	Ethiopia	3:41.28	Q
22	3	Andreas Vojta	Austria	3:41.34	
23	2	Abdalaati Iguider	Morocco	3:41.41	Q
24	2	Manuel Olmedo	Spain	3:41.78	Q
25	2	Tarek Boukensa	Algeria	3:41.87	Q
26	2	Eduard Villanueva	Venezuela	3:41.89	Q
27	3	Hamza Driouch	Qatar	3:42.09	
28	2	Jeffrey Riseley	Australia	3:42.22	
29	2	Andrew Wheating	United States	3:42.68	
30	2	Dmitrijs Jurkevičs	Latvia	3:42.69	
31	2	Jeroen D'Hoedt	Belgium	3:45.54	
32	3	Nabil Mohammed Al-Garbi	Yemen	3:50.17	PB
33	2	Charles Delys	French Polynesia	3:51.36	SB
34	3	Florian Carvalho	France	3:53.88	
35	1	Sin Sang-min	South Korea	3:55.02	
36	2	Mehdi Baala	France	4:13.10	q by Referees
37	2	Ribeiro Pinto De Carvalho	Timor-Leste	4:30.56	PB
	1	Mohammed Shaween	Saudi Arabia	DNF	

=== Semifinals ===
Qualification: First 5 in each heat (Q) and the next 2 fastest (q) advance to the final.

Rank	Heat	Name	Nationality	Time	Notes
1	2	Asbel Kiprop	Kenya	3:36.75	Q
2	2	Tarek Boukensa	Algeria	3:36.84	Q
3	2	Mohamed Moustaoui	Morocco	3:36.87	Q
4	2	Manuel Olmedo	Spain	3:36.91	Q
5	2	Eduar Villanueva	Venezuela	3:36.96	Q, NR
6	2	Ciaran O'Lionaird	Ireland	3:36.96	q
7	2	Nick Willis	New Zealand	3:37.39	q
8	2	Yoann Kowal	France	3:37.44	
9	2	Daniel Kipchirchir Komen	Kenya	3:37.58	
10	2	Juan Carlos Higuero	Spain	3:37.92	
11	2	Deresse Mekonnen	Ethiopia	3:44.65	
12	2	Chaminda Wijekoon	Sri Lanka	3:44.81	
13	1	Matthew Centrowitz	United States	3:46.66	Q
14	1	Mekonnen Gebremedhin	Ethiopia	3:46.71	Q
15	1	Silas Kiplagat	Kenya	3:46.75	Q
16	1	Mehdi Baala	France	3:46.87	Q
17	1	Abdalaati Iguider	Morocco	3:46.89	Q
18	1	Yusuf Saad Kamel	Bahrain	3:47.18	
19	1	Amine Laâlou	Morocco	3:47.65	
20	1	Ryan Gregson	Australia	3:47.89	
21	2	Leonel Manzano	United States	3:47.98	
22	1	Geoffrey Martinson	Canada	3:48.83	
23	1	Diego Ruiz	Spain	3:49.26	
24	1	Taoufik Makhloufi	Algeria	3:50.86	
25	1	Zebene Alemayehu	Ethiopia	3:51.19	

=== Final ===
Rank	Name	Nationality	Time	Notes
1st place, gold medalist(s)	Asbel Kiprop	Kenya	3:35.69	
2nd place, silver medalist(s)	Silas Kiplagat	Kenya	3:35.92	
3rd place, bronze medalist(s)	Matthew Centrowitz	United States	3:36.08	
4	Manuel Olmedo	Spain	3:36.33	
5	Abdalaati Iguider	Morocco	3:36.56	
6	Mohamed Moustaoui	Morocco	3:36.80	
7	Mekonnen Gebremedhin	Ethiopia	3:36.81	
8	Eduar Villanueva	Venezuela	3:37.31	
9	Mehdi Baala	France	3:37.46	
10	Ciaran O'Lionaird	Ireland	3:37.81	
11	Tarek Boukensa	Algeria	3:38.05	
12	Nick Willis	New Zealand	3:38.69	
