= Birtukan Fente =

Ethiopian athlete (born 1989)

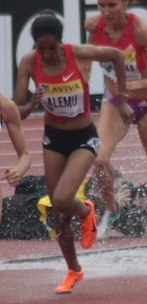
- Birtukan Fente in 2012

Personal information
- Born: 18 June 1989 (age 37)

Sport
- Country: Ethiopia
- Sport: Track and field
- Event: 3000 metres steeplechase

Birtukan Fente Alemu (born 18 June 1989) is an Ethiopian runner competing primarily in the 3000 metres steeplechase. She represented her country at the 2011 and 2015 World Championships reaching the final on the first occasion.

Fente has won multiple elite cross country races including Cross della Vallagarina, Antrim International Cross Country, and Lotto Cross Cup de Hannut. She is from Bekoji, Ethiopia.

== Competition record ==
Year	Competition	Venue	Position	Event	Notes
Representing Ethiopia
2005	World Youth Championships	Marrakesh, Morocco	13th	3000 m	9:58.72
2011	World Championships	Daegu, South Korea	8th	3000 m s'chase	9:36.81
2015	World Championships	Beijing, China	24th (h)	3000 m s'chase	9:39.77
2017	World Championships	London, United Kingdom	11th (h)	3000 m s'chase	9:33.99^{1}

^{1}Did not start in the final

== Personal bests ==
Outdoor

- 1500 metres – 4:31.96 (Rieti 2011)
- 3000 metres – 9:04.87 (Padova 2010)
- 5000 metres – 15:16.69 (Shanghai 2015)
- 3000 metres steeplechase – 9:24.91 (Rome 2015).

Indoor

- 5000 metres – 15:22.56 (Stockholm 2015)
