= Kayo Sugihara =

Japanese long-distance runner

Personal information
- Born: 6 June 1983 (age 42) Shimane Prefecture, Japan
- Height: 1.61 m (5 ft 3 in)
- Weight: 43 kg (95 lb)

Sport
- Sport: Track and field
- Event(s): 5000 m, 10,000 m

Kayo Sugihara (杉原 加代, Sugihara Kayo; born 24 February 1983 in Shimane Prefecture) is a Japanese athlete who specialises in long-distance events. She represented her country at the 2007 and 2011 World Championships. In addition, she won a silver medal at the 2006 Asian Games.

== Competition record ==
Year	Competition	Venue	Position	Event	Notes
Representing Japan
2003	Asian Championships	Manila, Philippines	6th	1500 m	4:30.24
2005	Asian Championships	Incheon, South Korea	4th	5000 m	15:50.75
2006	Asian Games	Doha, Qatar	2nd	5000 m	15:40.87
2007	World Championships	Osaka, Japan	17th (h)	5000 m	15:31.44
2009	East Asian Games	Hong Kong, China	1st	10,000 m	33:55.43
2011	World Championships	Daegu, South Korea	18th (h)	5000 m	15:41.78
2011	World Championships	Daegu, South Korea	15th	10,000 m	32:53.89
2012	World Half Marathon Championships	Kavarna, Bulgaria	19th	5000 m	1:13:36

== Personal bests ==
Outdoor

- 1500 metres – 4:17.41 (Yokohama 2003)
- 3000 metres – 8:56.89 (Rovereto 2006)
- 5000 metres – 15:15.34 (Nobeoka 2007)
- 10,000 metres – 31:34.35 (Palo Alto 2011)
- 15 kilometres – 50:59 (Miyazaki 2007)
- 20 kilometres – 1:08:01 (Miyazaki 2007)
- Half marathon – 1:11:35 (Miyazaki 2007)
