= Thomas Longosiwa =

Kenyan long-distance runner

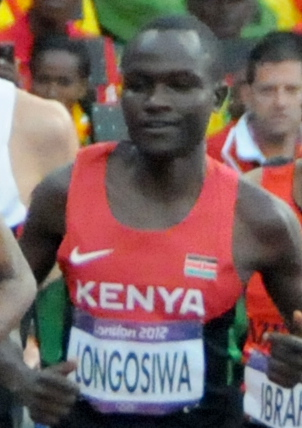
- Thomas Longosiwa in 2012

Personal information
- Nationality: Kenyan
- Born: 14 January 1982 (age 44)

Sport
- Sport: Running
- Event: 5000 metres

Achievements and titles
- Personal bests: 3000 m: 7:30.09 (2009); 5000 m: 12:49.04 (2012); 10000 m: 28:11.30 (2006); 10000 m (road): 27:56 (2004)
Medal record
Men's athletics
Representing Kenya
Olympic Games
| Bronze medal – third place | 2012 London | 5000 m |
All-Africa Games
| Bronze medal – third place | 2015 Brazzaville | 5000 m |

Thomas Pkemei Longosiwa (born January 14, 1982) is a Kenyan professional athlete who has competed at the two Olympics, winning a bronze medal at the 2012 Summer Olympics. He is also the Kenyan 5000 metres champion from 2007.

He was selected to represent Kenya at the 2006 World Junior Championships in Beijing, but during the Kenyan training camp he was caught to have two Kenyan passports, one indicating he was born in 1982 and the other 1988. The latter passport would have enabled him to compete at the championships. He was arrested for several days and fined 1500 US Dollars. A senior police official was accused of forging the age of Longosiwa and some other athletes. Earlier in 2006 Longosiwa had competed at the junior category of the 2006 IAAF World Cross Country Championships, where he finished 13th, but was later disqualified.

He began competing on the senior circuit in 2007, coming sixth at the 2007 All-Africa Games and then running the 3000 m and 5000 m events at the 2007 IAAF World Athletics Final. He gained selection for the 2008 Beijing Olympics and came twelfth in the men's 5000 m final. He set a 3000 m personal best of 7:30.09 at the Qatar Athletic Super Grand Prix in May 2009, finishing runner-up to Eliud Kipchoge in a time of 7:30.09 minutes. He also ran in the event at the 2009 IAAF World Athletics Final, where he came tenth. He struggled in 2010 due to bouts of typhoid and malaria.

He won the Cross della Vallagarina in Italy in January 2011. He was part of the Kenyan team for the 2011 World Championships in Athletics and came sixth in the men's 5000 metres. He closed the track season with a second-place finish over 5000 m at the Memorial van Damme Diamond League meeting. In November, he ran the opening leg of the International Chiba Ekiden and won the first stage which helped the team to victory.

In March 2012 he won the 80th edition of the Cinque Mulini and came third at the Trofeo Alasport. He was runner-up to Edwin Soi at the Giro Media Blenio in April. Longosiwa was second in the 5000 m at the Shanghai Golden Grand Prix and secured a place on the Kenyan Olympic team with a top three finish at the trials. He ran a 5000 m best of 12:49.04 minutes a month before the 2012 London Olympics then went on to win his first ever major medal, taking the bronze medal in the Olympic 5000 m final. After the Olympics he ran in the 2012 Diamond League final, where he placed second behind Isaiah Kiplangat Koech. Two podium finishes at the Giro di Castelbuono and Giro al Sas brought a close to the year for Longosiwa.

== Major competition record ==
| Year | Competition | Venue | Position | Notes |
|---|---|---|---|---|
| 2007 | All-Africa Games | Algiers, Algeria | 6th | 5000 m |
| 2007 | World Athletics Final | Stuttgart, Germany | 5th | 3000 m |
| 2007 | World Athletics Final | Stuttgart, Germany | 8th | 5000 m |
| 2008 | Olympic Games | Beijing, China | 12th | 5000 m |
| 2009 | World Athletics Final | Thessaloniki, Greece | 10th | 3000 m |
| 2011 | World Championships | Daegu, South Korea | 6th | 5000 m |
| 2012 | Olympic Games | London, United Kingdom | 3rd | 5000 m |

== Personal bests ==
| Event | Time (m:s) | Venue | Date |
|---|---|---|---|
| 3000 m | 7:30.09 | Doha, Qatar | 8 May 2009 |
| 5000 m | 12:49.04 | Paris, France | 6 July 2012 |
| 10000 m | 28:11.3 | Nairobi, Kenya | 22 July 2006 |
| 10 km (road) | 27:56 | Eldoret, Kenya | 31 October 2004 |

- All information taken from IAAF profile.
