= Cherono Koech =

Kenyan middle-distance runner

Cherono Koech (born 8 December 1992) is a Kenyan middle-distance runner. She was born in Kericho. At the 2012 Summer Olympics, she competed in the Women's 800 metres.
