= Megumi Kinukawa =

Japanese long-distance runner (born 1989)

Megumi Kinukawa (絹川 愛, Kinukawa Megumi; born 7 August 1989) is a Japanese long-distance runner. She represented her country at the 2007 World Championships in Athletics in Osaka and is the Japanese high school and junior record holder for the 10,000 metres.

Born in Takasaki, Gunma, she attended Sendai Ikue High School – an institution renowned for its athletic programme. Kinukawa made her first impact on the national junior circuit in 2006, as she won the junior race at the Fukuoka International Cross Country and was runner-up at the Chiba Cross Country two weeks later. This gained her a debut international selection at the 2006 IAAF World Cross Country Championships (also held in Fukuoka), where the sixteen-year-old came in fourteenth place and helped the Japanese girls to a team bronze medal. Turning to the track later that April, she ran a national junior record in the 10,000 metres at the Hyogo Relay Carnival, placing second behind Lucy Wangui with a mark of 31:35.27 minutes – raising her to eleventh on the all-time junior rankings.

Kinukawa ran at the Fukuoka Cross Country in 2007 and became the first high school student to win the senior title at the competition. With the 2007 World Championships in Athletics to be held in Osaka, she opted to focus on her track performances and achieved the "A" standard for the 10,000 m in April. She took third place in the event at the Japanese Athletics Championships and earned her first senior selection as a result. At the World Championships in Osaka that August she came fourteenth in the women's 10,000 m, coming in as the second best Asian finisher behind compatriot Kayoko Fukushi. Kinukawa took to the roads at the end of the year to compete for the Japanese team at the Chiba International Ekiden. She played a key role in Japan's victory at the competition, winning the fourth stage and closing the gap on Catherine Kirui of then-leaders Kenya.

She suffered a stress fracture injury to her foot in April 2008 and only returned to serious competition in 2009. The injury continued to affect her running and she managed only 56th place at the 2010 Chiba Cross Country. The 2011 season saw her return to form and breakthrough into the senior ranks with a win over 5000 m at the Japanese Athletics Championships and then a third-place finish on her half marathon debut at the Sapporo Half Marathon. At the 2011 World Championships in Athletics in Daegu she missed out on qualification in the 5000 m and finished last over 10,000 m.

She was the only Japanese to reach the podium at the 2012 Chiba Cross Country in February, taking third behind Kenyan opposition, and repeated that placing at the Fukuoka meet.
