= Bahrain at the 2025 World Athletics Championships =

- Flag of Bahrain
- WA code: BHR

in Tokyo, Japan 13 September 2025 – 21 September 2025
- Competitors: 8 (1 man and 7 women)
- Medals Ranked 25th: Gold 0 Silver 1 Bronze 1 Total 2

World Athletics Championships appearances
- 1983; 1987; 1991; 1993; 1995; 1997; 1999; 2001; 2003; 2005; 2007; 2009; 2011; 2013; 2015; 2017; 2019; 2022; 2023; 2025

Bahrain competed at the 2025 World Athletics Championships in Tokyo, Japan, from 13 to 21 September 2025.

== Medallists ==
Medal	Athlete	Event	Date
Silver	Winfred Yavi	Women's 3000 metres steeplechase	September 17
Bronze	Salwa Eid Naser	Women's 400 metres	September 18

== Results ==
Bahrain entered 8 athletes: 1 man and 7 women..

Key

- Q = Qualified for the next round
- q = Qualified for the next round as a fastest loser or, in field events, by position without achieving the qualifying target
- NR = National record
- PB = Personal best
- SB = Season best
- N/A = Round not applicable for the event

=== Men ===
Track and road events

Athlete	Event	Heat		Semifinal		Final	
Athlete	Event	Result	Rank	Result	Rank	Result	Rank
Birhanu Balew	5000 metres	13:41.75	3 Q	—N/a		13:00.55	7

=== Women ===
Track and road events

Athlete	Event	Heat		Semifinal		Final	
Athlete	Event	Result	Rank	Result	Rank	Result	Rank
Salwa Eid Naser	400 metres	49.13	1 Q	49.47	1 Q	48.19	3rd place, bronze medalist(s)
Nelly Jepkosgei	800 metres	2:02.79	5	Did not advance			
Eunice Chumba	Marathon	—N/a				2:32:22	16
Shitaye Eshete	Marathon	—N/a				2:28:41	6
Tigist Gashaw	Marathon	—N/a				DNF	
Kemi Adekoya	400 metres hurdles	55.15	4 Q	54.04 SB	4	Did not advance	
Winfred Yavi	3000 metres steeplechase	9:15.63	1 Q	—N/a		8:56.46	2nd place, silver medalist(s)
