= Turks and Caicos Islands at the 2011 World Championships in Athletics =

- WA code: TKS
- National federation: Turks & Caicos Islands Amateur Athletic Association

in Daegu
- Competitors: 0
- Medals: Gold 0 Silver 0 Bronze 0 Total 0

World Championships in Athletics appearances
- 1983; 1987; 1991; 1993–1999; 2001; 2003; 2005–2011; 2013; 2015; 2017; 2019; 2022; 2023; 2025

The Turks and Caicos Islands did not compete at the 2011 World Championships in Athletics from August 27 to September 4 in Daegu, South Korea.

== Team selection ==
One athlete was announced to represent the country in the event due to the preliminary Entry List. However, he did not appear on the Official Start List.

KEY:	Did not participate	Competed in another event

	Event	Athlete
Men	200 metres	Delano Williams
