= Norway at the 2011 World Championships in Athletics =

- WA code: NOR
- National federation: Norges Friidrettsforbund
- Website: www.friidrett.no

in Daegu
- Competitors: 13
- Medals: Gold 0 Silver 1 Bronze 0 Total 1

World Championships in Athletics appearances (overview)
- 1980; 1983; 1987; 1991; 1993; 1995; 1997; 1999; 2001; 2003; 2005; 2007; 2009; 2011; 2013; 2015; 2017; 2019; 2022; 2023; 2025

Norway competed at the 2011 World Championships in Athletics from August 27 to September 4 in Daegu, South Korea.

== Team selection ==
A team of 13 athletes was announced to represent the country in the event. The team will be led by Olympic gold medalist and defending world champion, javelin thrower Andreas Thorkildsen. The final team on the entry list comprises the names of 16 athletes.

The following athletes appeared on the preliminary Entry List, but not on the Official Start List of the specific event, resulting in a total number of 13 competitors:

KEY:	Did not participate	Competed in another event

	Event	Athlete
Men	20 kilometres walk	Erik Tysse
Men	50 kilometres walk	Håvard Haukenes
Women	800 metres	Ingvill Måkestad Bovim
Women	100 m hurdles	Christina Vukićević

== Medalists ==
The following competitors from Norway won medals at the Championships

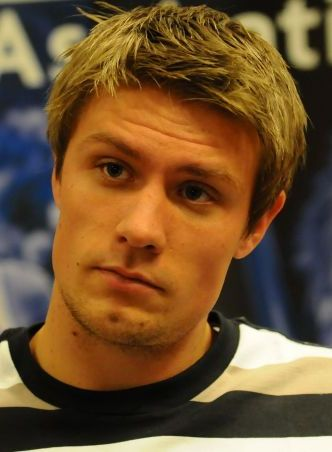
Andreas Thorkildsen (archived from 2008)

Medal	Athlete	Event
Silver	Andreas Thorkildsen	Javelin throw

== Results ==
=== Men ===
Athlete	Event	Preliminaries		Heats		Semifinals		Final	
Athlete	Event	Time Width Height	Rank	Time Width Height	Rank	Time Width Height	Rank	Time Width Height	Rank
Jaysuma Saidy Ndure	100 metres			10.33	16 Q	10.21	11	Did not advance	
Jaysuma Saidy Ndure	200 metres			20.65	13	20.50	5	19.95 SB	4
Urige Buta	Marathon							2:20:16	32
Bjørnar Ustad Kristensen	3000 metres steeplechase			8:39.85	29			Did not advance	
Trond Nymark	50 kilometres walk							3:54:26 SB	17
Eivind Henriksen	Hammer throw	71.27	24					Did not advance	
Andreas Thorkildsen	Javelin throw	81.83	7					84.78	2nd place, silver medalist(s)

=== Women ===
Athlete	Event	Preliminaries		Heats		Semifinals		Final	
Athlete	Event	Time Width Height	Rank	Time Width Height	Rank	Time Width Height	Rank	Time Width Height	Rank
Ezinne Okparaebo	100 metres			11.20 NR	12 Q	11.48	13	Did not advance	
Ingvill Måkestad Bovim	1500 metres			4:08.26	8	4:08.03	4	4:06.85	6
Stine Tomb	400 m hurdles			57.51	31	Did not advance			
Tonje Angelsen	High jump	1.85	23					Did not advance	
Cathrine Larsåsen	Pole vault	NM						Did not advance	
Mona Holm	Hammer throw	67.16	20					Did not advance	

Heptathlon

Ida Marcussen	Heptathlon			
Ida Marcussen	Event	Results	Points	Rank
	100 m hurdles	13.96 PB	984	23
	High jump	1.71	867	23
	Shot put	12.81	715	18
	200 m	25.74	820	23
	Long jump	5.88	813	23
	Javelin throw	44.90	762	10
	800 m	2:11.01 PB	950	6
Total			5911	20
