= Bahrain at the 2019 World Athletics Championships =

- WA code: BHR

in Doha, Qatar 27 September 2019 – 6 October 2019
- Competitors: 21 (11 men and 10 women) in 13 events
- Medals Ranked 12th: Gold 1 Silver 1 Bronze 1 Total 3

World Athletics Championships appearances
- 1983; 1987; 1991; 1993; 1995; 1997; 1999; 2001; 2003; 2005; 2007; 2009; 2011; 2013; 2015; 2017; 2019; 2022; 2023; 2025

Bahrain competed at the 2019 World Athletics Championships in Doha, Qatar, from 27 September to 6 October 2019. Bahrain was represented by 21 athletes.

== Medalists ==
Medal	Athlete	Event	Date
Gold	Salwa Eid Naser	Women's 400 metres	October 3
Silver	Rose Chelimo	Women's marathon	September 27
Bronze	Musa Isah; Aminat Yusuf Jamal; Salwa Eid Naser; Abbas Abubakar Abbas	Mixed 4 × 400 metres relay	September 29

== Results ==
Key

- Q = Qualified for the next round
- q = Qualified for the next round as a fastest loser or, in field events, by position without achieving the qualifying target
- NR = National record
- PB = Personal best
- SB = Season best
- N/A = Round not applicable for the event

=== Men ===
Track and road events

Athlete	Event	Heat		Semifinal		Final	
Athlete	Event	Result	Rank	Result	Rank	Result	Rank
Abbas Abubakar Abbas	400 metres	DNS		Did not advance			
Abraham Kipchirchir Rotich	1500 metres	3:45.19	39	Did not advance			
Birhanu Balew	5000 metres	13:25.70	14 q	—		13:14.66	9
Dawit Fikadu	5000 metres	DNS		—		Did not advance	
Hassan Chani	10,000 metres	—				DQ	
Albert Rop	10,000 metres	—				DNS	
El Hassan El Abbassi	Marathon	—				2:11:44 SB	7
Benson Seurei	Marathon	—				DNF	
John Koech	3000 metres steeplechase	DNS		—		Did not advance	

=== Women ===
Track and road events

Athlete	Event	Heat		Semifinal		Final	
Athlete	Event	Result	Rank	Result	Rank	Result	Rank
Salwa Eid Naser	400 metres	50.74	3 Q	49.79	2 Q	48.14 WL	1st place, gold medalist(s)
Tigist Gashaw	5000 metres	DNF		—		Did not advance	
Rose Chelimo	Marathon	—				2:33:46	2nd place, silver medalist(s)
Eunice Chebichii Chumba	Marathon	—				DNS	
Shitaye Eshete	Marathon	—				DNF	
Desi Jisa Mokonin	Marathon	—				2:43:19	12
Aminat Yusuf Jamal	400 metres hurdles	DNS		Did not advance			
Winfred Mutile Yavi	3000 metres steeplechase	9:29.40	13 Q	—		PB	4

Field events

Athlete	Event	Qualification		Final	
Athlete	Event	Result	Rank	Result	Rank
Noora Salem Jasim	Shot put	17.36	22	Did not advance	

=== Mixed ===
Track and road events

Athlete	Event	Heat		Semifinal		Final	
Athlete	Event	Result	Rank	Result	Rank	Result	Rank
Musa Isah; Aminat Yusuf Jamal; Salwa Eid Naser; Abbas Abubakar Abbas	4 × 400 metres relay	3:12.74 AR	3 Q	—		3:11.82 AR	3rd place, bronze medalist(s)
