= Akia Guerrier =

Turks and Caicos Islands sprinter (born 1998)

Akia A. Guerrier
Personal information
- Nationality: Turks and Caicos Islands
- Born: 9 November 1998 (age 26) Providenciales, Turks and Caicos
- Height: 5"4
- Weight: 130 Ibs

Sport
- Country: Turks and Caicos Islands
- Sport: Track and field
- Event(s): 200 metres, 100 metres, 400 metres

Akia Aretha Guerrier (born 9 November 1998) is a sprinter for the Turks and Caicos Islands. She specialises in the 100 m, 200 m and 400 m sprints. As of 2025, she is the national record holder for the Turks and Caicos Islands in the 100 m, 200 m, 400 m, and long jump. Akia has competed in numerous international events for the Turks and Caicos Islands including the 2015 World Youth Championships in Athletics, 2015 Commonwealth Youth Games, and 2016 IAAF World U20 Championships.

In July 2015, Guerrier became the first Turks and Caicos athlete to qualify for the IAAF World U18 Championships. She was coached by Randy Ford.

In September 2015, Guerrier broke Rosalie Hall's longstanding 200 metres record by running 25.14 seconds at the Commonwealth Youth Games.

Guerrier was an All-American sprinter for the Kansas State Wildcats track and field team, leading off their 8th-place 4 × 100 meters relay team at the 2017 NCAA Division I Outdoor Track and Field Championships.

== Personal bests ==
Event	Time (seconds)	Venue	Date
200 metres	23.91	KSU Ward Haylett Invite, Kansas	6 May 2017
400 metres	55.62	Arizona, Sun Angel Track Classic	6 April 2019
100 metres	11.55	St. George's, Grenada	26 March 2016
