= Turkey at the 2011 World Championships in Athletics =

- WA code: TUR
- National federation: Türkiye Atletizm Federasyonu
- Website: www.taf.org.tr

in Daegu
- Competitors: 20
- Medals: Gold 0 Silver 0 Bronze 0 Total 0

World Championships in Athletics appearances (overview)
- 1983; 1987; 1991; 1993; 1995; 1997; 1999; 2001; 2003; 2005; 2007; 2009; 2011; 2013; 2015; 2017; 2019; 2022; 2023

Turkey competed at the 2011 World Championships in Athletics from August 27 to September 4 in Daegu, South Korea.

== Team selection ==
An initial team of 23 athletes was announced to represent the country in the event. In the absence of the 2010 European Athletics Championships 10000m Elvan Abeylegesse, who is missing this summer due to maternity, the team is led by the current European 5000m champion Alemitu Bekele. The final team on the entry list comprises the names of 21 athletes.

The following athletes appeared on the preliminary Entry List, but not on the Official Start List of the specific event, resulting in a total number of 20 competitors:

KEY:	Did not participate	Competed in another event

	Event	Athlete
Women	4 x 400 metres relay	Merve Aydın
Women	4 x 400 metres relay	Sema Aydemir-Apak

== Results ==
=== Men ===
Athlete	Event	Preliminaries		Heats		Semifinals		Final	
Athlete	Event	Time Width Height	Rank	Time Width Height	Rank	Time Width Height	Rank	Time Width Height	Rank
Bekir Karayel	Marathon							2:33:20 SB	47
Abdurrahim Çelik	20 kilometres walk							1:25:39	28
Ercüment Olgundeniz	Discus throw	60.86	25					Did not advance	
Eşref Apak	Hammer throw	73.38	18					Did not advance	
Fatih Eryıldırım	Hammer throw	69.37	28					Did not advance	
Fatih Avan	Javelin throw	81.94	5					83.34	5

=== Women ===
Athlete	Event	Preliminaries		Heats		Semifinals		Final	
Athlete	Event	Time Width Height	Rank	Time Width Height	Rank	Time Width Height	Rank	Time Width Height	Rank
Pınar Saka	400 metres			53.59	25	Did not advance			
Merve Aydın	800 metres			2:04.88	32	Did not advance			
Tuğba Karakaya	1500 metres			4:10.38	12	4:08.58	8	4:08.14	8
Aslı Çakır	1500 metres			4:08.05	7	4:11.51	22	Did not advance	
Alemitu Bekele	5000 metres			15:38.25	17			Did not advance	
Bahar Doğan	Marathon							2:42:56	36
Nevin Yanıt	100 m hurdles			13.07 SB	17	13.31	22	Did not advance	
Nagihan Karadere	400 m hurdles			56.76	26	Did not advance			
Birsen Yavuz-Engin	400 m hurdles			57.22	29	Did not advance			
Binnaz Uslu	3000 metres steeplechase			9:24.56 NR	2			9:31.06	7
Gülcan Mıngır	3000 metres steeplechase			10:04.83	26			Did not advance	
Nagihan Karadere; Birsen Yavuz-Engin; Meliz Redif; Pınar Saka	4 x 400 metres relay			3:32.15	15			Did not advance	
Semiha Mutlu	20 kilometres walk							DNF	
Karin Melis Mey	Long jump	6.52	11 q					6.44	8
