= 2011 World Championships in Athletics – Women's 1500 metres =

Event at the olympics

Gold	Silver	Bronze
Jennifer Barringer Simpson; United States	Hannah England; Great Britain & N.I.	Natalia Rodríguez; Spain

Official Video

The Women's 1500 metres at the 2011 World Championships in Athletics was held at the Daegu Stadium on August 28 & 30, and September 1.

Maryam Yusuf Jamal of Bahrain, the gold medallist in 2009, had the two fastest times of the year prior to the competition. American Morgan Uceny entered as the Diamond League leader and her compatriot Shannon Rowbury (bronze in 2009) was also present. The 2010 World Indoor champion Kalkidan Gezahegne, Russia's Ekaterina Gorbunova and Btissam Lakhouad of Morocco completed the top four fastest runners that year. Other prominent entrants included 2008 Olympic champion Nancy Jebet Langat, 2009 runner-up Lisa Dobriskey and world indoor medallists Natalia Rodríguez and Gelete Burka.

The final was a tight pack, disrupted in the turn less than a lap and a half before the finish when Hellen Onsando Obiri fell taking out Uceny along with her. With a pack of 9 remaining, the competitors jockeyed for position on the final lap. As they entered the final straightaway Natalia Rodríguez had a slight edge on the pack almost four wide. Jennifer Barringer Simpson and Hannah England were trailing the pack but Simpson went wide and passed the field as Rodríguez started to falter. England followed Simpson in full sprint across the finish line.

Nataliya Tobias was disqualified for doping in 2012 after further analysis of a sample of hers from the Daegu Championships. Olesya Syreva, Anzhela Shevchenko and Natallia Kareiva have later had their results disqualified after they were found to be doping based on abnormalities in their biological passport profiles.

Athletes disqualified for doping
Athlete	Nation	Rank	Anti-doping rule violation
Nataliya Tobias	Ukraine	9	Post event test positive for testosterone
Olesya Syreva	Russia	18 sf	Biological passport
Yekaterina Martynova	Russia	10 sf	Biological passport
Natallia Kareiva	Belarus	19 h	Biological passport
Anzhela Shevchenko	Ukraine	32 h	Biological passport

== Records ==
Prior to the competition, the records were as follows:

World record	Yunxia Qu (CHN)	3:50.46	Beijing, China	11 September 1993
Championship record	Tatyana Tomashova (RUS)	3:58.52	Paris, France	31 August 2003
World Leading	Maryam Yusuf Jamal (BHR)	4:00.33	Hengelo, Netherlands	29 May 2011
African Record	Hassiba Boulmerka (ALG)	3:55.30	Barcelona, Spain	8 August 1992
Asian Record	Yunxia Qu (CHN)	3:50.46	Beijing, China	11 September 1993
North, Central American and Caribbean record	Mary Slaney (USA)	3:57.12	Stockholm, Sweden	26 July 1983
South American record	Letitia Vriesde (SUR)	4:05.67	Tokyo, Japan	31 August 1991
European Record	Tatyana Kazankina (URS)	3:52.47	Zürich, Switzerland	13 August 1980
Oceanian record	Sarah Jamieson (AUS)	4:00.93	Stockholm, Sweden	25 July 2006

== Qualification standards ==
A time	B time
4:05.90	4:08.90

== Schedule ==
Date	Time	Round
August 28, 2011	10:40	Heats
August 30, 2011	20:35	Semifinals
September 1, 2011	20:55	Final

== Results ==
KEY:	q	Fastest non-qualifiers	Q	Qualified	NR	National record	PB	Personal best	SB	Seasonal best

=== Heats ===
Qualification: First 6 in each heat (Q) and the next 6 fastest (q) advance to the semifinals.

Rank	Heat	Name	Nationality	Time	Notes
1	3	Maryam Yusuf Jamal	Bahrain	4:07.04	Q
2	3	Nuria Fernández	Spain	4:07.29	Q
3	3	Morgan Uceny	United States	4:07.43	Q
4	3	Hellen Obiri	Kenya	4:07.59	Q, PB
5	3	Yekaterina Martynova	Russia	4:07.76	Q
6	3	Gelete Burka	Ethiopia	4:07.91	Q
7	3	Aslı Çakır	Turkey	4:08.05	q
8	3	Ingvill Måkestad Bovim	Norway	4:08.26	q
9	3	Kaila McKnight	Australia	4:08.74	q
10	3	Renata Pliś	Poland	4:08.83	q
11	3	Anna Mishchenko	Ukraine	4:09.02	q
12	2	Tugba Karakaya	Turkey	4:10.38	Q
13	2	Btissam Lakhouad	Morocco	4:10.71	Q
14	2	Viola Kibiwot	Kenya	4:10.74	Q
15	2	Natalia Rodríguez	Spain	4:10.76	Q
16	2	Jennifer Barringer Simpson	United States	4:10.84	Q
17	2	Nataliya Tobias	Ukraine	4:10.99	Q
18	2	Olesya Syreva	Russia	4:11.24	q
~~19~~	2	~~Natallia Kareiva~~	~~Belarus~~	~~4:12.03~~	DQ
19	2	Genzeb Shumi	Bahrain	4:12.32	
20	2	Meskerem Assefa	Ethiopia	4:12.43	
21	2	Lisa Dobriskey	Great Britain & N.I.	4:12.70	
22	1	Hannah England	Great Britain & N.I.	4:13.45	Q
23	1	Mimi Belete	Bahrain	4:13.50	Q
24	1	Siham Hilali	Morocco	4:13.59	Q
25	1	Natalya Yevdokimova	Russia	4:14.36	Q
26	1	Nancy Lagat	Kenya	4:14.37	Q
27	1	Shannon Rowbury	United States	4:14.43	Q
28	1	Kalkidan Gezahegne	Ethiopia	4:14.45	q *
29	1	Isabel Macías	Spain	4:14.75	
30	3	Malika Akkaoui	Morocco	4:14.79	
31	1	Anzhela Shevchenko	Ukraine	4:16.22	
32	2	Gladys Landaverde	El Salvador	4:28.50	SB
33	1	Tandiwe Nyathi	Zimbabwe	4:32.79	PB
34	1	Nikki Hamblin	New Zealand	4:36.70	

- Following a protest lodged by the Ethiopian federation, due to a crash by New Zealand's Nikki Hamblin who caused Gezahegne to stagger onto the infield.

=== Semifinals ===
Qualification: First 5 in each heat (Q) and the next 2 fastest (q) advance to the final.

Rank	Heat	Name	Nationality	Time	Notes
1	2	Natalia Rodríguez	Spain	4:07.88	Q
2	2	Jennifer Barringer Simpson	United States	4:07.90	Q
3	2	Nataliya Tobias	Ukraine	4:07.99	Q
4	2	Ingvill Måkestad Bovim	Norway	4:08.03	Q
5	2	Btissam Lakhouad	Morocco	4:08.10	Q
6	2	Hannah England	Great Britain & N.I.	4:08.31	q
7	2	Mimi Belete	Bahrain	4:08.42	q
8	1	Tugba Karakaya	Turkey	4:08.58	Q
9	2	Viola Kibiwot	Kenya	4:08.64	
11	1	Hellen Obiri	Kenya	4:08.93	Q
12	1	Kalkidan Gezahegne	Ethiopia	4:08.96	Q
13	1	Maryam Yusuf Jamal	Bahrain	4:08.96	Q
14	1	Morgan Uceny	United States	4:09.03	Q
15	1	Nuria Fernández	Spain	4:09.53	
16	1	Siham Hilali	Morocco	4:09.64	
17	1	Anna Mishchenko	Ukraine	4:09.78	
18	1	Olesya Syreva	Russia	4:09.83	
19	1	Kaila McKnight	Australia	4:10.83	
20	1	Renata Pliś	Poland	4:11.12	
21	1	Shannon Rowbury	United States	4:11.49	
22	2	Aslı Çakır	Turkey	4:11.51	
23	1	Natalya Yevdokimova	Russia	4:11.70	
24	2	Nancy Lagat	Kenya	4:12.92	
	2	Gelete Burka	Ethiopia	DNF	
DSQ	2	Yekaterina Martynova	Russia	~~4:08.67~~	

=== Final ===
Rank	Name	Nationality	Time	Notes
1st place, gold medalist(s)	Jennifer Barringer Simpson	United States	4:05.40	
2nd place, silver medalist(s)	Hannah England	Great Britain & N.I.	4:05.68	
3rd place, bronze medalist(s)	Natalia Rodríguez	Spain	4:05.87	
4	Btissam Lakhouad	Morocco	4:06.18	
5	Kalkidan Gezahegne	Ethiopia	4:06.42	
6	Ingvill Måkestad Bovim	Norway	4:06.85	
7	Mimi Belete	Bahrain	4:07.60	
8	Tugba Karakaya	Turkey	4:08.14	
9	Morgan Uceny	United States	4:19.71	
10	Hellen Obiri	Kenya	4:20.23	
11	Maryam Yusuf Jamal	Bahrain	4:22.67	
-	Nataliya Tobias	Ukraine	4:08.68	DQ
