= Turks and Caicos Islands at the 2022 World Athletics Championships =

- Flag of the Turks and Caicos Islands
- WA code: TKS

in Eugene, United States 15 July 2022 – 24 July 2022
- Competitors: 1 (1 woman)
- Medals: Gold 0 Silver 0 Bronze 0 Total 0

World Athletics Championships appearances
- 1983; 1987; 1991; 1993–1999; 2001; 2003; 2005–2011; 2013; 2015; 2017; 2019; 2022; 2023; 2025

The Turks and Caicos Islands competed at the 2022 World Athletics Championships in Eugene, Oregon, United States, which were held from 15 to 24 July 2022. The athlete delegation of the country was composed of one competitor, hurdler Yanique Haye-Smith. She competed in the women's 400 metres hurdles; there, she failed to make it past the qualifying heats.

== Background ==
The 2022 World Athletics Championships in Eugene, Oregon, United States, were held from 15 to 24 July 2022. To qualify for the World Championships, athletes had to reach an entry standard (e.g. time and distance), place in a specific position at select competitions, be a wild card entry, or qualify through their World Athletics Ranking at the end of the qualification period.

As the Turks and Caicos Islands did not meet any of the four standards, they could send either one male or one female athlete in one event of the Championships who has not yet qualified. The Turks & Caicos Islands Amateur Athletic Association selected hurdler Yanique Haye-Smith who held a personal best of 55.65 seconds and a season's best of 56.72 seconds in the women's 400 metres hurdles, her entered event. This was her second World Championships appearance for the Turks and Caicos Islands.

== Results ==
Haye-Smith competed in the qualifying heats of the women's 400 metres hurdles on 19 July 2022 in the second heat against seven other competitors. There, she recorded a time of 57.99 seconds and placed last, failing to advance further as the top three fastest athletes of each heat and the next four fastest athletes overall would only be able to do so.

Results
Athlete	Event	Heat		Semi-final		Final	
Athlete	Event	Result	Rank	Result	Rank	Result	Rank
Yanique Haye-Smith	400 m hurdles	57.99	34	Did not advance			
