= Finland at the 2011 World Championships in Athletics =

- WA code: FIN
- National federation: Suomen Urheiluliitto RY
- Website: www.sul.fi

in Daegu
- Competitors: 13
- Medals: Gold 0 Silver 0 Bronze 0 Total 0

World Championships in Athletics appearances
- 1976; 1980; 1983; 1987; 1991; 1993; 1995; 1997; 1999; 2001; 2003; 2005; 2007; 2009; 2011; 2013; 2015; 2017; 2019; 2022; 2023

Finland competed at the 2011 World Championships in Athletics from August 27 to September 4 in Daegu, South Korea.

== Team selection ==
A team of 17 athletes (including 4 reserves) was announced to represent the country in the event, the country's smallest ever squad in the Championship's history. The team was led by javelin thrower Tero Pitkämäki. Pole vaulter Minna Nikkanen withdrew due to injury.

The following athletes (reserves) appeared on the preliminary Entry List, but not on the Official Start List of the specific event, resulting in total number of 13 competitors:

KEY:	Did not participate	Competed in another event

	Event	Athlete
Men	3000 metres steeplechase	Janne Ukonmaanaho
Men	Pole vault	Eemeli Salomäki
Men	Hammer throw	David Söderberg
Men	Javelin throw	Sampo Lehtola

== Results ==
=== Men ===
Athlete	Event	Preliminaries		Heats		Semifinals		Final	
Athlete	Event	Time Width Height	Rank	Time Width Height	Rank	Time Width Height	Rank	Time Width Height	Rank
Jonathan Åstrand	200 metres			20.87	26	21.03	17	Did not advance	
Jukka Keskisalo	3000 metres steeplechase			8:31.52	21			Did not advance	
Jarkko Kinnunen	50 kilometres walk							3:52:32 SB	15
Antti Kempas	50 kilometres walk							DSQ	
Osku Torro	High jump	2.16	31					Did not advance	
Jere Bergius	Pole vault	5.35	24					Did not advance	
Olli-Pekka Karjalainen	Hammer throw	76.60 SB	9					76.60 SB	9
Antti Ruuskanen	Javelin throw	81.03	12					79.46	9
Ari Mannio	Javelin throw	80.27	14					Did not advance	
Tero Pitkämäki	Javelin throw	79.46	17					Did not advance	

=== Women ===
Athlete	Event	Preliminaries		Heats		Semifinals		Final	
Athlete	Event	Time Width Height	Rank	Time Width Height	Rank	Time Width Height	Rank	Time Width Height	Rank
Sandra Eriksson	3000 metres steeplechase			10:03.20	24			Did not advance	
~~Minna Nikkanen~~	Pole vault	DNS						Did not advance	
Merja Korpela	Hammer throw	65.64	24					Did not advance	
