= 2013 World Championships in Athletics – Men's 10,000 metres =

Men's 10,000 metres at the 2013 World Championships
- Venue: Luzhniki Stadium
- Dates: 10 August (final)
- Competitors: 35 from 19 nations
- Winning time: 27:21.71

Medalists
gold medal	Mo Farah; Great Britain & N.I.
silver medal	Ibrahim Jeilan; Ethiopia
bronze medal	Paul Kipngetich Tanui; Kenya

Official Video

The men's 10,000 metres at the 2013 World Championships in Athletics were held at the Luzhniki Stadium on 10 August.

With the temperature at the start of the race over 27º the competitors were taking heat precautions. Olympic Champion Mo Farah dropped to last place in the early stages, later there occasions when he would go to the front of the pack, though he made no effort to quicken the pace from the lead. With the lead pack down to about 10, with a kilometer to go, American Dathan Ritzenhein charged around the pack and into the lead. That woke up the rest of the contenders, quickly swallowing up Ritzenhein's effort. After some jockeying by a host of contenders, Farah seized the lead just before the last lap. Down the backstretch, the remaining contenders, Ibrahim Jeilan, Paul Tanui and Galen Rupp sprinted to keep up with Farah and rounding the final turn, defending champion Jeilan seemed to be moving into position to repeat his sprint past Farah to the finish. But unlike 2011, Farah had an extra gear to hold off Jeilan, crossing the line holding his hands high, before doing his post race "Mobot" dance. The 27:21.71 sets a new Russian all comers record.

== Records ==
Prior to the competition, the records were as follows:

World record	Kenenisa Bekele (ETH)	26:17.53	Brussels, Belgium	26 August 2005
Championship record	Kenenisa Bekele (ETH)	26:46.31	Berlin, Germany	17 August 2009
World Leading	Dejen Gebremeskel (ETH)	26:51.02	Sollentuna, Sweden	27 June 2013
African Record	Kenenisa Bekele (ETH)	26:17.53	Brussels, Belgium	26 August 2005
Asian Record	Ahmad Hassan Abdullah (QAT)	26:38.76	Brussels, Belgium	5 September 2003
North, Central American and Caribbean record	Galen Rupp (USA)	26:48.00	Brussels, Belgium	16 September 2011
South American Record	Marilson dos Santos (BRA)	27:28.12	Neerpelt, Belgium	2 June 2007
European Record	Mo Farah (GBR)	26:46.57	Eugene, OR, United States	3 June 2011
Oceanian record	Ben St. Lawrence (AUS)	27:24.95	Palo Alto, CA, United States	1 May 2011

== Qualification standards ==
A time	B time
27:40.00	28:05.00

== Schedule ==
Date	Time	Round
10 August 2013	18:55	Final

All times are local times (UTC+4)

== Results ==
KEY:	NR	National record	PB	Personal best	SB	Seasonal best

=== Final ===
The race was started at 18:55.

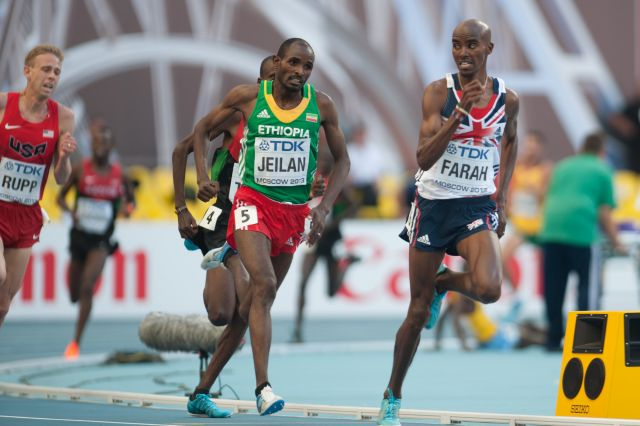
10000 m men finish

Rank	Name	Nationality	Time	Notes
1st place, gold medalist(s)	Mo Farah	Great Britain & N.I.	27:21.71	SB
2nd place, silver medalist(s)	Ibrahim Jeilan	Ethiopia	27:22.23	SB
3rd place, bronze medalist(s)	Paul Kipngetich Tanui	Kenya	27:22.61	
4	Galen Rupp	United States	27:24.39	SB
5	Abera Kuma	Ethiopia	27:25.27	
6	Bedan Karoki	Kenya	27:27.17	
7	Kenneth Kipkemoi	Kenya	27:28.50	SB
8	Nguse Amlosom	Eritrea	27:29.21	SB
9	Mohammed Ahmed	Canada	27:35.76	SB
10	Dathan Ritzenhein	United States	27:37.90	SB
11	Thomas Ayeko	Uganda	27:40.96	PB
12	Imane Merga	Ethiopia	27:42.02	
13	Moses Ndiema Kipsiro	Uganda	27:44.53	SB
14	Cameron Levins	Canada	27:47.89	SB
15	Tsuyoshi Ugachi	Japan	27:50.79	SB
16	Dejen Gebremeskel	Ethiopia	27:51.88	
17	Goitom Kifle	Eritrea	27:56.38	
18	Chris Derrick	United States	28:04.54	SB
19	Daniele Meucci	Italy	28:06.74	SB
20	Stephen Mokoka	South Africa	28:11.61	
21	Suguru Osako	Japan	28:19.50	
22	Timothy Toroitich	Uganda	28:33.61	
23	Bashir Abdi	Belgium	28:41.69	
24	Collis Birmingham	Australia	28:44.82	SB
25	Yevgeny Rybakov	Russia	28:47.49	
	Jake Robertson	New Zealand	DNF	
	Polat Kemboi Arıkan	Turkey	DNF	
	Juan Luis Barrios	Mexico	DNF	
	Alemu Bekele	Bahrain	DNF	
	Teklemariam Medhin	Eritrea	DNF	
	Yuki Sato	Japan	DNF	
	Robert Kajuga	Rwanda	DNF	
	Ben St Lawrence	Australia	DNS	
	Ali Hasan Mahbood	Bahrain	DNS	
	Mukhlid Al-Otaibi	Saudi Arabia	DNS	
