= Bahrain at the 2013 World Championships in Athletics =

- WA code: BRN
- National federation: Bahrain Athletics Association

in Moscow
- Competitors: 9
- Medals: Gold 0 Silver 0 Bronze 0 Total 0

World Championships in Athletics appearances
- 1983; 1987; 1991; 1993; 1995; 1997; 1999; 2001; 2003; 2005; 2007; 2009; 2011; 2013; 2015; 2017; 2019; 2022; 2023; 2025

Bahrain competed at the 2013 World Championships in Athletics in Moscow, Russia, from 10 to 18 August 2013. A team of ten athletes was announced to represent the country in the event.

== Results ==
(q – qualified, NM – no mark, SB – season best)

=== Men ===
Athlete	Event	Preliminaries		Heats		Semifinals		Final	
Athlete	Event	Time	Rank	Time	Rank	Time	Rank	Time	Rank
Dejene Regassa	5000 metres			13:25.21	12 q			13:34.54	11
Alemu Bekele	10,000 metres							DNF	
Ali Hasan Mahbood	10,000 metres							DNF	
Aadam Ismaeel Khamis	Marathon							DNF	
Tareq Mubarak Taher	3000 metres steeplechase			8:34.32 SB	28			did not advance	

=== Women ===
Athlete	Event	Preliminaries		Heats		Semifinals		Final	
Athlete	Event	Time	Rank	Time	Rank	Time	Rank	Time	Rank
Mimi Belete	1500 metres			4:09.27	24 Q	4:14.22	23	did not advance	
Tejitu Daba	5000 metres			15:56.74	15 Q				
Shitaye Eshete	10,000 metres							31:13.79 SB	6
Lishan Dula	Marathon							2:38:47 SB	15
