= 2011 World Championships in Athletics – Men's javelin throw =

International Javelin Throw Event

Official Video

The Men's Javelin throw event at the 2011 World Championships in Athletics was held at the Daegu Stadium on September 1 & 3.

Preliminary leader Guillermo Martínez made his best throw in the first round, followed shortly by Matthias de Zordo's 86.27 winner. Meanwhile, favorite world leader Andreas Thorkildsen languished in as low as eighth place, barely the last qualifier for his remaining three throws. All of the competitors had previously thrown far enough to displace Thorkildsen in the preliminary round. On his fourth throw he finally put one good throw together to leapfrog into the silver medal position. de Zordo was ranked fourth and Martínez had only been ranked twelfth on the annual list prior to the competition.

== Medalists ==
Gold	Silver	Bronze
Matthias de Zordo; Germany	Andreas Thorkildsen; Norway	Guillermo Martínez; Cuba

== Records ==
Prior to the competition, the records were as follows:

World record	Jan Železný (CZE)	98.48	Jena, Germany	25 May 1996
Championship record	Jan Železný (CZE)	92.80	Edmonton, Canada	12 August 2001
World leading	Andreas Thorkildsen (NOR)	90.61	Byrkjelo, Norway	14 August 2011
African record	Marius Corbett (RSA)	88.75	Kuala Lumpur, Malaysia	21 September 1998
Asian record	Kazuhiro Mizoguchi (JPN)	87.60	San Jose, United States	27 May 1989
North, Central American and Caribbean record	Breaux Greer (USA)	91.29	Indianapolis, United States	21 June 2007
South American record	Edgar Baumann (PAR)	84.70	San Marcos, United States	17 October 1999
European record	Jan Železný (CZE)	98.48	Jena, Germany	25 May 1996
Oceanian record	Jarrod Bannister (AUS)	89.02	Brisbane, Australia	29 February 2008

== Qualification standards ==
A result	B result
82.00	79.50

== Schedule ==
All times local.

Date	Time	Round
September 1, 2011	19:00	Qualification
September 3, 2011	19:10	Final

== Results ==
=== Qualification ===
Qualification: Qualifying Performance 82.50 (Q) or at least 12 best performers (q) advance to the final

Rank	Group	Athlete	Nationality	#1	#2	#3	Result	Notes
1	A	Guillermo Martínez	Cuba	83.77			83.77	Q
2	A	Dmitri Tarabin	Russia	x	82.92		82.92	Q
3	B	Stuart Farquhar	New Zealand	82.10	x	-	82.10	q
4	A	Matthias de Zordo	Germany	82.05	81.11	x	82.05	q
5	B	Fatih Avan	Turkey	80.27	77.68	81.94	81.94	q
6	B	Mark Frank	Germany	80.96	81.93	-	81.93	q
7	A	Andreas Thorkildsen	Norway	79.36	80.85	81.83	81.83	q
8	A	Vítězslav Veselý	Czech Republic	79.99	74.77	81.64	81.64	q
9	B	Roman Avramenko	Ukraine	76.30	x	81.46	81.46	q
10	B	Sergey Makarov	Russia	81.42	80.18	78.33	81.42	q
11	A	Jarrod Bannister	Australia	81.35	x	75.91	81.35	q
12	B	Antti Ruuskanen	Finland	79.54	81.03	78.14	81.03	q
13	B	Igor Janik	Poland	80.88	76.63	78.98	80.88	
14	B	Ari Mannio	Finland	74.09	80.27	79.31	80.27	
15	A	Yukifumi Murakami	Japan	80.19	78.04	74.93	80.19	
16	A	Jakub Vadlejch	Czech Republic	68.32	80.08	x	80.08	
17	A	Tero Pitkämäki	Finland	78.21	79.46	76.05	79.46	
18	B	Chen Qi	China	x	74.28	78.42	78.42	
19	A	Scott Russell	Canada	76.47	77.49	74.23	77.49	
20	A	Ēriks Rags	Latvia	77.34	x	76.23	77.34	
21	A	Yervásios Filippídis	Greece	76.66	70.42	73.41	76.66	
22	B	Leslie Copeland	Fiji	76.57	74.54	73.82	76.57	
23	A	Mihkel Kukk	Estonia	73.21	72.10	76.42	76.42	
24	B	Petr Frydrych	Czech Republic	75.38	76.18	x	76.18	
25	B	Vadims Vasiļevskis	Latvia	74.67	75.23	x	75.23	
26	B	Gabriel Wallin	Sweden	72.96	74.44	74.09	74.44	
27	B	Arley Ibargüen	Colombia	73.22	74.02	x	74.02	
28	B	Alexandr Ivanov	Russia	73.81	x	x	73.81	
29	A	Oleksandr Pyatnytsya	Ukraine	71.93	72.05	73.56	73.56	
30	B	Spyridon Lebesis	Greece	x	73.35	70.44	73.35	
31	A	Matija Kranjc	Slovenia	73.17	x	-	73.17	
32	B	Zigismunds Sirmais	Latvia	70.20	x	73.16	73.16	
33	A	John Robert Oosthuizen	South Africa	69.65	73.14	72.79	73.14	
34	B	Jung Sang-jin	South Korea	72.03	x	x	72.03	
35	A	Ihab Abdelrahman El Sayed	Egypt	71.99	68.00	x	71.99	SB
36	A	Rinat Tarzumanov	Uzbekistan	x	67.07	70.32	70.32	
	A	Mike Hazle	United States				DNS	

=== Final ===
Rank	Athlete	Nationality	#1	#2	#3	#4	#5	#6	Result	Notes
1st place, gold medalist(s)	Matthias de Zordo	Germany	86.27	85.51	-	-	82.88	81.40	86.27	SB
2nd place, silver medalist(s)	Andreas Thorkildsen	Norway	80.75	80.46	80.60	84.78	x	80.28	84.78	
3rd place, bronze medalist(s)	Guillermo Martínez	Cuba	84.30	80.12	80.09	76.99	-	78.69	84.30	
4	Vítězslav Veselý	Czech Republic	81.19	x	84.11	79.64	76.28	x	84.11	SB
5	Fatih Avan	Turkey	78.24	83.34	78.96	79.87	x	77.58	83.34	
6	Roman Avramenko	Ukraine	82.51	x	82.20	79.71	78.87	x	82.51	
7	Jarrod Bannister	Australia	82.25	x	-	x	76.60	x	82.25	SB
8	Mark Frank	Germany	78.78	x	81.81	78.48	80.98	77.73	81.81	
9	Antti Ruuskanen	Finland	x	79.46	79.06				79.46	
10	Dmitri Tarabin	Russia	x	79.06	x				79.06	
11	Stuart Farquhar	New Zealand	78.99	75.18	77.13				78.99	
12	Sergey Makarov	Russia	77.73	78.76	78.05				78.76	
