= List of Turks and Caicos Islands records in athletics =

The following are the national records in athletics in the Turks and Caicos Islands maintained by country's national athletics federation: Turks & Caicos Islands Amateur Athletic Association (TCIAAA).

== Outdoor ==
Key to tables: Awaiting ratification Record not kept by TCIAAA Not ratified or later rescinded by TCIAAA

=== Men ===
Event	Record	Athlete	Date	Meet	Place	Ref.
100 m	10.28 (−0.7 m/s)	Delano Williams	15 March 2013	ISSA/Grace Kennedy Boys and Girls Championship	Kingston, Jamaica	
200 m	20.27 (+0.9 m/s)	Delano Williams	14 March 2013	ISSA/Grace Kennedy Boys and Girls Championship	Kingston, Jamaica	
400 m	46.54	Colby Jennings	26 March 2022		Tempe, United States	
800 m	1:50.02	Ken Reyes	2 June 2018		Kingston, Jamaica	
1000 m	2:51.08 (Note: mark was achieved in an octathlon)	Woodens Corvil	5 April 2015	CARIFTA Games	Basseterre, Saint Kitts and Nevis	
1500 m	4:02.0 h	Idi Gardiner	20 March 1996		Cockburn Town, Turks and Caicos Islands	
3000 m	9:38.80	Martijn Healy	22 April 2022		Utrecht, Netherlands	
5000 m	16:05.51	Martijn Healy	20 May 2022		Wageningen, Netherlands	
10,000 m						
Marathon	3:47:57	Todd Foss	10 October 2004	Chicago Marathon	Chicago, United States	
110 m hurdles	17.38 (−1.2 m/s)	Levard Missick	30 July 1998		Annecy, France	
400 m hurdles	59.20	Angelo Garland	4 February 2012		Spanish Town, Jamaica	
3000 m steeplechase						
High jump	2.20 m	Domanique Missick	19 August 2012		Providenciales, Turks and Caicos Islands	
Pole vault	3.95 m (Note: mark was achieved in a decathlon)	Wilkenson Fenelon	22 March 2018	ISSA/Grace Kennedy Boys and Girls Championships	Kingston, Jamaica	
Long jump	8.06 m (+1.8 m/s)	Ifeanyichukwu Otuonye	9 June 2018		Chula Vista, United States	
Triple jump	14.00 m (−1.8 m/s)	Rayvon Walkin	9 April 2022		Kingston, Jamaica	
Shot put	12.52 m	Michael Fulford	31 March 1986		Cockburn Town, Turks and Caicos Islands	
Discus throw	34.47 m	Levard Missick	12 April 1998	CARIFTA Games	Port of Spain, Trinidad and Tobago	
Hammer throw	43.04 m	Conrad Howell	16 May 2022		Chester, United States	
Javelin throw	55.76 m	Yvandy Rigby	21 April 2018		Woodbury, United States	
Decathlon	4536 pts	Alvirto Smith	4–5 April 2009	WU Invitational	St. Louis, United States	
Decathlon	100m / Long jump / Shot put / High jump / 400m / 110m H / Discus / Pole vault / Javelin / 1500m; 12.14w / 6.02 m / 8.38 m / 1.72 m / 56.05 / 19.85 / 24.27 m / 2.35 m / 38.60 m / 5:16.47					
20 km walk (road)						
50 km walk (road)						
4 × 100 m relay	41.17	Turks and Caicos Islands; Courtney Missick; Ifeanyichukwu Otuonye; Angelo Garland; Wilkinson Fenelon	6 August 2022	Commonwealth Games	Birmingham, United Kingdom	
4 × 200 m relay	1:26.22	Turks and Caicos Islands; Ifeanyichukwu Otuonye; Angelo Garland; Devante Gardiner; Frantzley Benjamin	23 April 2017	IAAF World Relays	Nassau, The Bahamas	
4 × 400 m relay	3:13.70	Turks and Caicos Islands; Angelo Garland; Ifeanyichukwu Otuonye; Devante Gardiner; Frantzley Benjamin	13 April 2018	Commonwealth Games	Gold Coast, Australia	

=== Women ===
Event	Record	Athlete	Date	Meet	Place	Ref.
100 m	11.99 (+1.2 m/s)	Akia Guerrier	29 July 2018	CAC Games	Barranquilla, Colombia	
100 m	11.54	Akia Guerrier	6 March 2016	TCI Inter High School Championships	Providenciales, Turks and Caicos Islands	
150 m	18.55 NWI	Helcy-Ann Sauver	17 December 2016	Spanish Town Gerald Claude Foster Over Distant Meet	Spanish Town, Jamaica	
200 m	23.48 (+1.2 m/s)	Yanique Haye-Smith	20 April 2019	Morgan State Legacy Meet	Baltimore, United States	
400 m	52.50	Yanique Haye-Smith	10 April 2021	Aggie Invitational	Greensboro, United States	
800 m	2:15.27	Rebecca Bernadin	6 May 2022		Prairie View, United States	
1500 m	4:46.03	Rebecca Bernadin	22 April 2022		Tuscaloosa, United States	
3000 m	10:49.36	Rebecca Bernadin	27 February 2019		Kingston, Jamaica	
5000 m	18:49.35	Rebecca Bernadin	25 March 2022	Al Schmidt Bulldog Relays	Starkville, United States	
10,000 m						
Marathon	3:45:48	Lynn Robinson	6 November 2011	New York City Marathon	New York City, United States	
100 m hurdles	17.33 (+1.7 m/s) (Note: record set during heptathlon competition)	Sanadia Forbes	4 April 2015	CARIFTA Games	Basseterre, Saint Kitts and Nevis	
100 m hurdles	17.2 h	Kadisha Wickham	17 February 2007		Providenciales, Turks and Caicos Islands	
400 m hurdles	55.58	Yanique Haye-Smith	8 June 2019	Star Athletics Sprint Series	Montverde, United States	
3000 m steeplechase	11:54.79	Rebecca Bernadin	15 April 2022		Auburn, United States	
High jump	1.68 m	Tanesia Gardiner	8 May 2021	TCI CARIFTA Trials	Providenciales, Turks and Caicos Islands	
Pole vault						
Long jump	4.98 m NWI	Tashy Forbes	2004		Kew, Turks and Caicos Islands	
Long jump	4.98 m (−2.4 m/s)	Lynn Antoine	10 April 2023	CARIFTA Games	Nassau, Bahamas	
Triple jump	10.34 m NWI	Shamara Rigby	12 April 2009	CARIFTA Games	Vieux Fort, Saint Lucia	
Shot put	12.19 m	Varlene Francis	9 April 2005		Spanish Town, Jamaica	
Discus throw	26.33 m	Maquieta Carter	8 April 2007	CARIFTA Games	Providenciales, Turks and Caicos Islands	
Hammer throw						
Javelin throw	24.77 m	Varlene Francis	1 April 2002	CARIFTA Games	Nassau, The Bahamas	
Heptathlon	3116 pts	Sanadia Forbes	4–5 April 2015	CARIFTA Games	Basseterre, Saint Kitts and Nevis	
Heptathlon	100m H / High jump / Shot put / 200m / Long jump / Javelin / 800m; 17.33 (+1.7 m/s) / 1.49 m / 7.29 m / 27.82 (+0.7 m/s) / 4.71 m (+0.8 m/s) / 11.70 m / 3:04.12					
20 km walk (road)						
4 × 100 m relay	48.85	Turks and Caicos Islands; Akia Guerrier; Helcyann Sauver; Shavell Sutherland; Sanadia Forbes	16 April 2017	CARIFTA Games	Willemstad, Curaçao	
4 × 400 m relay	4:17.51	Turks and Caicos Islands; Z. Butler; A. Prince; A. Joseph; A. Anara	2 April 2018	CARIFTA Games	Nassau, Bahamas	

=== Mixed ===
Event	Record	Athlete	Date	Meet	Place	Ref.
4 × 400 m relay	3:47.19	Turks and Caicos Islands; J. Campbell; Rebecca Bernadin; Colby Jennings; A. Howell	23 July 2017		Nassau, Bahamas	
4 × 400 m relay	3:40.29	Turks and Caicos Islands; Bernard Hyde; Roniesha Johnson; Xavier Joseph; Tanesia Gardiner	31 March 2024	CARIFTA Games	St. George's, Grenada	
4 × 400 m relay	3:36.57	Turks and Caicos Islands; Evans; Haye Smith; Black; Tanesia Gardiner	16 August 2025	NACAC Championships	Freeport, Bahamas	

== Indoor ==
=== Men ===
Event	Record	Athlete	Date	Meet	Place	Ref.
60 m	6.81 (heat)	Emmanuel Agenor	29 January 2022		Topeka, United States	
60 m	6.81 (final)	Emmanuel Agenor	29 January 2022		Topeka, United States	
200 m	21.64	Colby Jennings	28 February 2021		Topeka, United States	
200 m	21.26 OT	Colby Jennings	1 March 2020		Pittsburg, United States	
300 m	35.18	Angelo Garland	6 January 2018	KSU Wildcat Invitational	Kansas, United States	
400 m	47.90	Colby Jennings	12 March 2021		Birmingham, United States	
400 m	46.89 OT	Colby Jennings	1 March 2020		Pittsburg, United States	
800 m						
1000 m	3:03.83	Alvirto Smith	5 February 2010	NCAA II Team Challenge	Findlay, United States	
1500 m						
3000 m						
60 m hurdles	9.69	Alvirto Smith	5 February 2010	NCAA II Team Challenge	Findlay, United States	
High jump	2.10 m	Kivarno Handfield	2 December 2017	Winston-Salem JDL College Kick-off Classic	Winston-Salem, United States	
Pole vault	2.74 m	Alvirto Smith	4 February 2010	NCAA II Team Challenge	Findlay, United States	
Long jump	7.79 m	Ifeanyichukwu Otuonye	16 February 2018	Arkansas Qualifier	Fayetteville, United States	
Triple jump	14.51 m A (Note: outdoor mark ratified as absolute record)	Ifeanyichukwu Otuonye	8 February 2013	New Mexico Don Kirby Elite	Albuquerque, United States	
Shot put	8.87 m (Note: record set during heptathlon competition)	Alvirto Smith	4 February 2010	NCAA II Team Challenge	Findlay, United States	
Heptathlon	3575 pts	Alvirto Smith	4–5 February 2010	NCAA II Team Challenge	Findlay, United States	
Heptathlon	60m / Long jump / Shot put / High jump / 60m H / Pole vault / 1000m; 7.97 / 5.73 m / 8.87 m / 1.69 m / 9.69 / 2.74 m / 3:03.83					
5000 m walk						
4 × 400 m relay						

=== Women ===
Event	Record	Athlete	Date	Meet	Place	Ref.
60 m	7.63	Yanique Haye-Smith	12 February 2021	"Kenny Giles" Invitational	Virginia Beach, United States	
200 m	23.71	Yanique Haye-Smith	24 February 2019	University Last Chance Qualifier	Boston, United States	
400 m	52.72	Yanique Haye-Smith	24 February 2019	University Last Chance Qualifier	Boston, United States	
800 m	2:19.02	Yanique Haye-Smith	5 December 2021	KMS Opener	Virginia Beach, United States	
1500 m	5:27.45 y	Rebecca Bernadin	28 February 2021		Topeka, United States	
1500 m	5:20.70 y OT	Rebecca Bernadin	1 March 2020		Pittsburg, United States	
Mile	5:27.45	Rebecca Bernadin	28 February 2021		Topeka, United States	
Mile	5:20.70 OT	Rebecca Bernadin	1 March 2020		Pittsburgh, United States	
3000 m	11:06.97	Rebecca Bernadin	22 January 2022		Birmingham, United States	
60 m hurdles						
High jump						
Pole vault						
Long jump						
Triple jump						
Shot put						
Pentathlon						
Pentathlon	60m H / High jump / Shot put / Long jump / 800m					
3000 m walk						
4 × 400 m relay						
