= Ingvill Måkestad Bovim =

Norwegian middle-distance runner

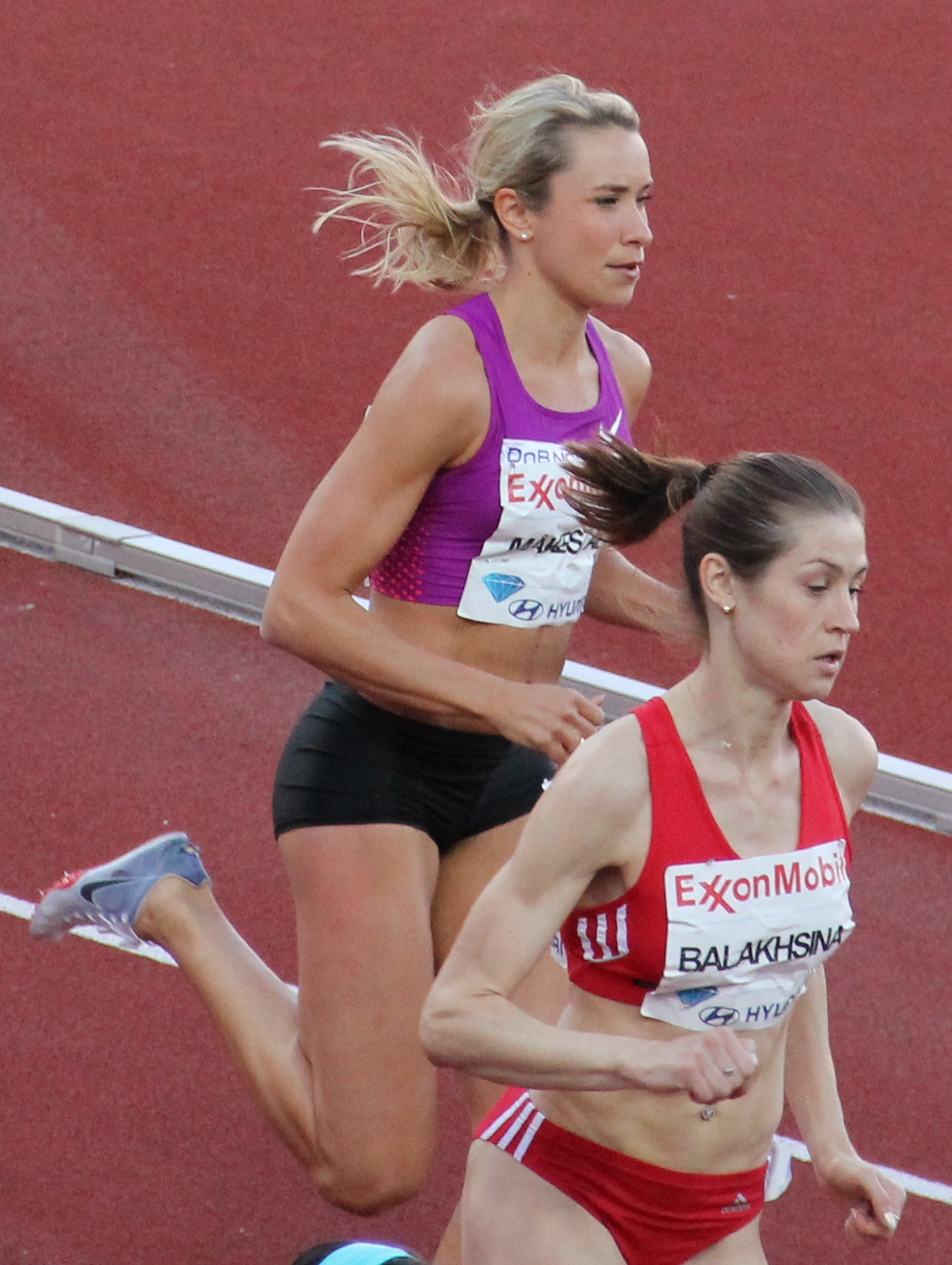
Måkestad Bovim at the 2010 Bislett Games

Ingvill Måkestad Bovim (born 7 August 1981, in Odda Municipality) is a Norwegian track and field athlete who specializes in middle distance running. She is the Norwegian record holder over 800 metres (1:59.82 minutes) and the less-contested 1000 m run (2:36.7 minutes). Her personal best in the 1500 metres is 4:02.20 minutes.

She represented Norway over 1500 m at the 2010 European Athletics Championships and 2011 European Athletics Indoor Championships but did not progress beyond the heats. She won the 1500 metres in the First League section of the 2011 European Team Championships and went on to finish sixth in the event at the 2011 World Championships in Athletics

== Achievements ==
Year	Competition	Venue	Position	Event	Notes
Representing Norway
2010	European Championships	Barcelona, Spain	15th (h)	1500 m	4:07.49
2011	European Indoor Championships	Paris, France	11th (h)	1500 m	4:12.13
2011	World Championships	Daegu, South Korea	6th	1500 m	4:06.85
2012	European Championships	Helsinki, Finland	9th	1500 m	4:13.32
2014	European Championships	Zürich, Switzerland	9th	1500 m	4:08.85
2016	European Championships	Amsterdam, Netherlands	4th	1500 m	4:34.15
