= Turks and Caicos Islands at the 2023 World Athletics Championships =

- Flag of the Turks and Caicos Islands
- WA code: TKS

in Budapest, Hungary 19 August 2023 – 27 August 2023
- Competitors: 1 (0 men and 1 woman)
- Medals: Gold 0 Silver 0 Bronze 0 Total 0

World Athletics Championships appearances
- 1983; 1987; 1991; 1993–1999; 2001; 2003; 2005–2011; 2013; 2015; 2017; 2019; 2022; 2023; 2025

The Turks and Caicos Islands competed at the 2023 World Athletics Championships in Budapest, Hungary, which were held from 19 to 27 August 2023. The athlete delegation of the territory was composed of one competitor, hurdler Yanique Haye-Smith who would compete in the women's 400 metres hurdles. She qualified upon being selected by the Turks & Caicos Islands Amateur Athletic Association. In the heats, she placed last out of the nine competitors that participated in her heat and did not advance further to the semifinals.

== Background ==
The 2023 World Athletics Championships in Budapest, Hungary, were held from 19 to 27 August 2023. The Championships were held at the National Athletics Centre. To qualify for the World Championships, athletes had to reach an entry standard (e.g. time or distance), place in a specific position at select competitions, be a wild card entry, or qualify through their World Athletics Ranking at the end of the qualification period.

As the Turks and Caicos Islands did not meet any of the four standards, they could send either one male or one female athlete in one event of the Championships who has not yet qualified. The Turks & Caicos Islands Amateur Athletic Association selected hurdler Yanique Haye-Smith who had previously represented the territory at the last Championships.

== Results ==
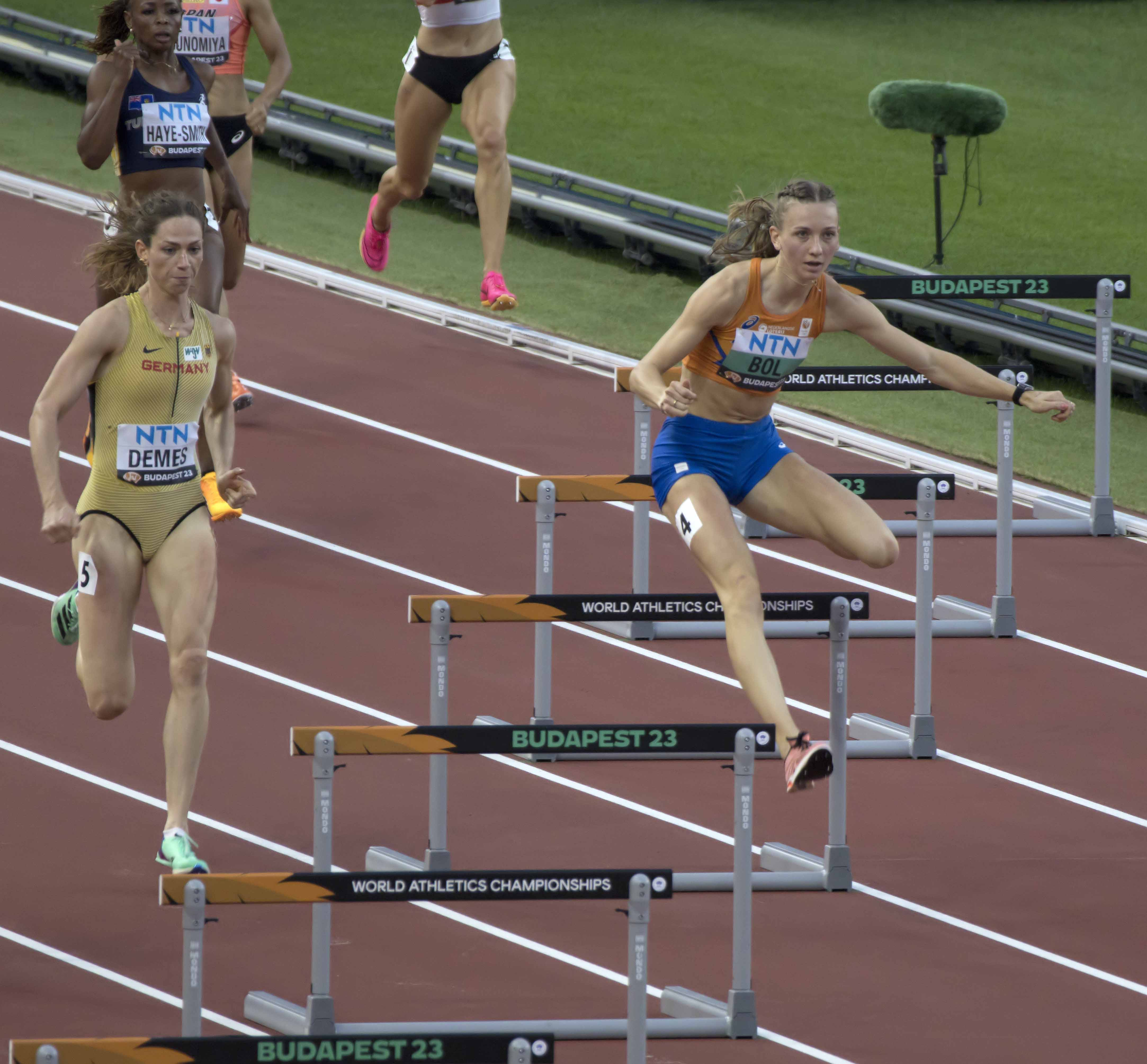
Haye-Smith (back left) during her heat

Haye-Smith competed in the first round of the women's 400 metres hurdles on 21 August against eight other competitors in her heat. She raced in the fourth heat and recorded a time of 1:00.08. There, she placed last and did not advance further to the semifinals.

Results
Athlete	Event	Heat		Semifinal		Final	
Athlete	Event	Result	Rank	Result	Rank	Result	Rank
Yanique Haye-Smith	400 metres hurdles	1:00.08	9	Did not advance			
