= Turks and Caicos Islands at the 2025 World Athletics Championships =

- Flag of the Turks and Caicos Islands
- WA code: TKS

in Tokyo, Japan 13 September 2025 – 21 September 2025
- Competitors: 1 (0 men and 1 woman)
- Medals: Gold 0 Silver 0 Bronze 0 Total 0

World Athletics Championships appearances
- 1983; 1987; 1991; 1993–1999; 2001; 2003; 2005–2011; 2013; 2015; 2017; 2019; 2022; 2023; 2025

The Turks and Caicos Islands competed at the 2025 World Athletics Championships in Tokyo, Japan, which were held from 13 to 21 September 2025. The athlete delegation of the territory consisted of one competitor, hurdler Yanique Haye-Smith. She competed in the women's 400 metres hurdles and failed to make it past the qualifying heats. Her time of 58.48 seconds was the slowest time during the heats.

== Background ==
The 2025 World Athletics Championships in Tokyo, Japan, were held from 19 to 27 August 2023. The Championships were held at the Japan National Stadium. To qualify for the World Championships, athletes had to reach an entry standard (e.g. time or distance), place in a specific position at select competitions, be a wild card entry, or qualify through their World Athletics Ranking at the end of the qualification period.

As the Turks and Caicos Islands did not meet any of the four standards, the Turks & Caicos Islands Amateur Athletic Association could send either one male or one female athlete in one event of the Championships who has not yet qualified. The Association selected Yanique Haye-Smith, who had a personal best of 55.58 seconds and a season's best of 56.74 seconds in the 400 metres hurdles, her entered event. This was her fourth World Championships appearance for the Turks and Caicos Islands.

== Results ==
Key

- Q = Qualified for the next round
- q = Qualified for the next round as a fastest loser or, in field events, by position without achieving the qualifying target
- NR = National record
- PB = Personal best
- SB = Season best
- N/A = Round not applicable for the event

=== Women ===
Haye-Smith competed in the qualifying heats of the women's 400 metres hurdles on 15 September in the fifth heat against seven other competitors. There, she recorded a time of 58.48 seconds and placed last, failing to advance further as only the top four fastest of each heat and the next four fastest athletes would only be able to do so. Her time was the slowest amongst the competitors in the qualifying heats.

Track and road events

Athlete	Event	Heat		Semifinal		Final	
Athlete	Event	Result	Rank	Result	Rank	Result	Rank
Yanique Haye-Smith	400 metres hurdles	58.48	8	Did not advance			
