= Uganda at the 2013 World Championships in Athletics =

- WA code: UGA
- National federation: Uganda Athletic Federation
- Website: www.athleticsuganda.co.ug

in Moscow
- Competitors: 12
- Medals: Gold 1 Silver 0 Bronze 0 Total 1

World Championships in Athletics appearances
- 1983; 1987; 1991; 1993; 1995; 1997; 1999; 2001; 2003; 2005; 2007; 2009; 2011; 2013; 2015; 2017; 2019; 2022; 2023

Uganda competed at the 2013 World Championships in Athletics in Moscow, Russia, from 10–18 August 2013. A team of 12 athlete was announced to represent the country in the event.

== Results ==
(q – qualified, NM – no mark, SB – season best)

=== Men ===
Athlete	Event	Preliminaries		Heats		Semifinals		Final	
Athlete	Event	Time Width Height	Rank	Time Width Height	Rank	Time Width Height	Rank	Time Width Height	Rank
Ronald Musagala	800 metres								
Moses Ndiema Kipsiro	5000 metres								
Phillip Kipyeko	5000 metres								
Thomas Ayeko	10,000 metres								
Moses Ndiema Kipsiro	10,000 metres								
Timothy Toroitich	10,000 metres								
Jacob Araptany	3000 metres steeplechase								
Benjamin Kiplagat	3000 metres steeplechase								
Timothy Toroitich	3000 metres steeplechase								
Abraham Kiplimo	Marathon								
Jackson Kiprop	Marathon								
Stephen Kiprotich	Marathon								1

=== Women ===
Athlete	Event	Preliminaries		Heats		Semifinals		Final	
Athlete	Event	Time Width Height	Rank	Time Width Height	Rank	Time Width Height	Rank	Time Width Height	Rank
Juliet Chekwel	10,000 metres								
Sarah Nambawa	Triple jump								
