= Bahrain at the 2009 World Championships in Athletics =

- WA code: BRN

in Berlin
- Competitors: 9 (6 men, 3 women)
- Medals: Gold 2 Silver 0 Bronze 1 Total 3

World Championships in Athletics appearances
- 1983; 1987; 1991; 1993; 1995; 1997; 1999; 2001; 2003; 2005; 2007; 2009; 2011; 2013; 2015; 2017; 2019; 2022; 2023

Bahrain fielded nine competitors at the 2009 World Championships in Athletics in Berlin, winning gold medals in the men's and women's 1500 meter events, and bronze in the men's 800 metres event, to finish 11th on the medal tally table.

== Team selection ==
Track and road events

Event	Athletes	
Event	Men	Women
100 metres		Rakia Al-Gassra
200 metres		Rakia Al-Gassra
800 metres	Belal Mansoor Ali; Yusuf Saad Kamel	
1500 metres	Belal Mansoor Ali; Yusuf Saad Kamel	Mimi Belete; Maryam Yusuf Jamal
3000 m steeplechase	Tareq Mubarak Taher	
Marathon	Khalid Kamal Yaseen; Stephen Loruo Kamar	

Field and combined events

Event	Athletes	
Event	Men	Women
Triple jump	Mohamed Yussef Al-Sahabi	

== Results ==
=== Men ===
Track and road events

Event	Athletes	Heats		Semifinal		Final	
Event	Athletes	Result	Rank	Result	Rank	Result	Rank
800 m	Belal Mansoor Ali	1:47.16	20	1:46.57	15	did not advance	
800 m	Yusuf Saad Kamel	1:46.43 SB	9	1:45.01 SB	1	1:45.35	Bronze medal
1500 m	Belal Mansoor Ali	3:43.06	24	3:36.87	8	3:37.72	9
1500 m	Yusuf Saad Kamel	3:37.59	5	3:36.87	8	3:35.93	Gold medal
3000 m steeplechase	Tareq Mubarak Taher	8:18.13	3	-		8:17.08	10
Marathon	Khalid Kamal Yaseen	-				2:20:11	40
Marathon	Stephen Loruo Kamar	-				DNF	

Field and combined events

Event	Athletes	Qualification		Final	
Event	Athletes	Result	Rank	Result	Rank
Triple jump	Mohamed Yussef Al-Sahabi	16.05	37	did not advance	

=== Women ===
Track and road events

Event	Athletes	Heats		Semifinal		Final	
Event	Athletes	Result	Rank	Result	Rank	Result	Rank
100 m	Rakia Al-Gassra	11.49 SB	23	11.51	24	did not advance	
200 m	Rakia Al-Gassra	23.34 SB	22	23.26 SB	18	did not advance	
1500 m	Mimi Belete	4:08.36	11	4:13.30	24	did not advance	
1500 m	Maryam Yusuf Jamal	4:08.76	14	4:03.64	1	4:03.74	Gold medal
