= Turks and Caicos Islands at the 2019 World Athletics Championships =

Turks and Caicos Islands at the 2019 World Championships in Athletics
- WA code: TKS

in Doha, Qatar 27 September – 6 October 2019
- Competitors: 1 (1 woman)
- Medals: Gold 0 Silver 0 Bronze 0 Total 0

World Championships in Athletics appearances
- 1983; 1987; 1991; 1993–1999; 2001; 2003; 2005–2011; 2013; 2015; 2017; 2019; 2022; 2023; 2025

The Turks and Caicos Islands competed at the 2019 World Athletics Championships in Doha, Qatar, which were held from 27 September to 6 October 2019. The athlete delegation of the country was composed of one competitor, hurdler Yanique Haye-Smith who would compete in the women's 400 metres hurdles. She qualified for the Championships after meeting the entry standard of her event. In the heats, Roban placed last out of the eight competitors that competed in her heat and did not advance to the semifinals of the event.

== Background ==
The 2019 World Athletics Championships in Doha, Qatar, were held from 27 September to 6 October 2019. The Championships were held at the Khalifa International Stadium. To qualify for the World Championships, athletes had to reach an entry standard (e.g. time or distance), place in a specific position at select competitions, be a wild card entry, or qualify through their World Athletics Ranking at the end of the qualification period.

Hurdler Yanique Haye-Smith would be the sole representative for the nation at the championships. She qualified after meeting the entry standard in the women's 400 metres hurdles of 56.00 seconds, recording a time of 55.65 seconds at the Grenada Invitational held in the Kirani James Athletic Stadium. At the time of her qualification, she was ranked third in the world. In the lead-up to the Championships, she was coached by her husband, Ali Smith.

== Result ==
=== Women ===
Haye-Smith competed in the heats of the women's 400 metres hurdles on 1 October against seven other competitors in her heat. She raced in the fourth heat and recorded a time of 56.98 seconds. There, he placed last and did not advance further to the semifinals.

Track and road events

Athlete	Event	Heat		Semifinal		Final	
Athlete	Event	Result	Rank	Result	Rank	Result	Rank
Yanique Haye-Smith	400 m hurdles	56.98	30	Did not advance			
