= Bahrain at the 2023 World Athletics Championships =

- Flag of Bahrain
- WA code: BRN

in Budapest, Hungary 19 August 2023 – 27 August 2023
- Competitors: 6 (2 men and 4 women)
- Medals Ranked 18th: Gold 1 Silver 0 Bronze 0 Total 1

World Athletics Championships appearances
- 1983; 1987; 1991; 1993; 1995; 1997; 1999; 2001; 2003; 2005; 2007; 2009; 2011; 2013; 2015; 2017; 2019; 2022; 2023

Bahrain competed at the 2023 World Athletics Championships in Budapest, Hungary, from 19 to 27 August 2023.

== Medallists ==
Medal	Name	Event	Date
Gold	Winfred Yavi	Women's 3000 metres steeplechase	27 August

== Results ==
Bahrain entered 6 athletes.

Key

- Q = Qualified for the next round
- q = Qualified for the next round as a fastest loser or, in field events, by position without achieving the qualifying target
- NR = National record
- PB = Personal best
- SB = Season best
- N/A = Round not applicable for the event

=== Men ===
Track and road events

Athlete	Event	Heat		Final	
Athlete	Event	Result	Rank	Result	Rank
Birhanu Balew	5000 metres	13:41.00	15	Did not advance	
Birhanu Balew	10,000 metres	—		28:08.03 SB	10

=== Women ===
Track and road events

Athlete	Event	Heat		Semifinal		Final	
Athlete	Event	Result	Rank	Result	Rank	Result	Rank
Kemi Adekoya	400 metres hurdles	53.56 AR	1 Q	53.39 AR	2 Q	53.09 AR	4
Winfred Yavi	3000 metres steeplechase	9:19.18	1 Q	—		8:54.29 WL	1st place, gold medalist(s)
Rose Chelimo	Marathon	—				DNF	
