= Bahrain at the 2011 World Championships in Athletics =

- WA code: BRN
- National federation: Bahrain Athletics Association
- Website: www.bahrainathletics.org

in Daegu
- Competitors: 11
- Medals: Gold 0 Silver 0 Bronze 0 Total 0

World Championships in Athletics appearances
- 1983; 1987; 1991; 1993; 1995; 1997; 1999; 2001; 2003; 2005; 2007; 2009; 2011; 2013; 2015; 2017; 2019; 2022; 2023

Bahrain competed at the 2011 World Championships in Athletics from August 27 to September 4 in Daegu, South Korea.

== Team selection ==
A team of 11 athletes was announced to represent the country in the event. The team is led by reigning world champions Maryam Yusuf Jamal and Youssef Saad Kamel. The final team on the entry list comprises the names of 13 athletes.

The following athletes appeared on the preliminary Entry List, but not on the Official Start List of the specific event, resulting in total number of 11 competitors:

KEY:	Did not participate	Competed in another event

	Event	Athlete
Men	10,000 metres	Billisuma Jamal
Men	3000 metres steeplechase	Tareq Mubarak Taher
Women	5000 metres	Kareema Jasim

All of the athletes on the Bahrain team had undergone a change in nationality in order to compete for Bahrain.

== Results ==
=== Men ===
Athlete	Event	Preliminaries		Heats		Semifinals		Final	
Athlete	Event	Time Width Height	Rank	Time Width Height	Rank	Time Width Height	Rank	Time Width Height	Rank
Youssef Saad Kamel	1500 metres			3:40.27 SB	13 Q	3:47.18	18	Did not advance	
Billisuma Jamal	5000 metres			13:35.86	7 q			13:27.67	8
Dalhan Nezar (Dejene Regassa)	5000 metres			13:56.83	27			Did not advance	
Ali Hasan Mahboob	10,000 metres							DNF	
Khaled Kamal Yaseen	Marathon							DNF	

=== Women ===
Athlete	Event	Preliminaries		Heats		Semifinals		Final	
Athlete	Event	Time Width Height	Rank	Time Width Height	Rank	Time Width Height	Rank	Time Width Height	Rank
Mimi Belete	1500 metres			4:13.50	24 Q	4:08.42	7 q	4:07.60	7
Maryam Yusuf Jamal	1500 metres			4:07.04	1 Q	4:08.96	13 Q	4:22.67	12
Jameela Shami (Genzeb Shumi)	1500 metres			4:12.32	20	Did not advance			
Tejitu Baba	5000 metres			15:33.67	9 Q			15:14.62 PB	9
Shitaye Mubarak	10,000 metres							31:21.57 NR	6
Lishan Dula	Marathon							2:33:47	20
