= Bahrain at the 2022 World Athletics Championships =

- Flag of Bahrain
- WA code: BRN
- National federation: Bahrain Athletics Association

in Eugene, United States 15–24 July 2022
- Competitors: 6 (2 men and 4 women) in 8 events
- Medals: Gold 0 Silver 0 Bronze 0 Total 0

World Athletics Championships appearances
- 1983; 1987; 1991; 1993; 1995; 1997; 1999; 2001; 2003; 2005; 2007; 2009; 2011; 2013; 2015; 2017; 2019; 2022; 2023

Bahrain competed at the 2022 World Athletics Championships in Eugene, United States, from 15 to 24 July 2022. Bahrain had entered 6 athletes.

== Results ==
- including alternates

Key

- Q = Qualified for the next round
- q = Qualified for the next round as a fastest loser or, in field events, by position without achieving the qualifying target
- NR = National record
- PB = Personal best
- SB = Season best
- N/A = Round not applicable for the event

=== Men ===
Track and road events

Athlete	Event	Preliminary		Heat		Semi-final		Final	
Athlete	Event	Result	Rank	Result	Rank	Result	Rank	Result	Rank
Birhanu Balew	Men's 5000 metres	—		DNS		—		Did not advance	
Birhanu Balew	Men's 10,000 metres	—						DNS	
Shumi Dechasa	Men's marathon	—						2:07:52 SB	9

=== Women ===
Track and road events

Athlete	Event	Preliminary		Heat		Semi-final		Final	
Athlete	Event	Result	Rank	Result	Rank	Result	Rank	Result	Rank
Edidiong Odiong	Women's 100 metres	—		DNS		Did not advance			
Edidiong Odiong	Women's 200 metres	—		DNS		Did not advance			
Eunice Chebichii Chumba	Women's marathon	—						DNS	
Aminat Jamal	Women's 400 metres hurdles	—		56.78 SB	29	Did not advance			
Winfred Mutile Yavi	Women's 3000 metres steeplechase	—		9:17.32	12 Q	—		9:01.31	4
