= Bahrain at the 2017 World Championships in Athletics =

- WA code: BRN

in London, United Kingdom
- Competitors: 26
- Medals Ranked =11th: Gold 1 Silver 1 Bronze 0 Total 2

World Championships in Athletics appearances
- 1983; 1987; 1991; 1993; 1995; 1997; 1999; 2001; 2003; 2005; 2007; 2009; 2011; 2013; 2015; 2017; 2019; 2022; 2023

Bahrain competed at the 2017 World Championships in Athletics in London, United Kingdom, 4–13 August 2017.

== Medalists ==
Medal	Athlete	Event	Date
Gold	Rose Chelimo	Women's marathon	August 6
Silver	Salwa Eid Naser	Women's 400 metres	August 9

== Results ==
(q – qualified, NM – no mark, SB – season best)

=== Men ===
Track and road events

Athlete	Event	Heat		Semifinal		Final	
Athlete	Event	Result	Rank	Result	Rank	Result	Rank
Andrew Fischer	100 metres	10.19	17 Q	10.36	22	Did not advance	
Salem Eid Yaqoob	200 metres	20.84	37	Did not advance			
Sadik Mikhou	1500 metres	3:42.12	12 Q	3:40.52	15 Q	3:35.81	6
Benson Kiplagat Seurei	1500 metres	3:39.77	10 q	3:40.96	19	Did not advance	
Zouhair Aouad	5000 metres	13:29.28	13	—		Did not advance	
Birhanu Balew	5000 metres	13:21.91	2 Q	—		13:43.25	12
Albert Kibichii Rop	5000 metres	13:32.40	28	—		Did not advance	
Abraham Cheroben	10,000 metres	—				27:11.08 NR	12
Hassan Chani	Marathon	—				2:22:19	50
Shumi Dechasa	Marathon	—				2:15:08 PB	15

=== Women ===
Track and road events

Athlete	Event	Heat		Semifinal		Final	
Athlete	Event	Result	Rank	Result	Rank	Result	Rank
Edidiong Ofonime Odiong	200 metres	23.24	16 Q	23.24	18	Did not advance	
Salwa Eid Naser	400 metres	50.57	1 Q	50.08	1 Q	50.06 NR	2nd place, silver medalist(s)
Kalkidan Gezahegne	5000 metres	15:07.19 PB	15 q	—		15:28.21	14
Bontu Rebitu	5000 metres	15:16.70 PB	15	—		Did not advance	
Shitaye Eshete	10,000 metres	—				31:38.66 SB	12
Desi Mokonin	10,000 metres	—				31:55.34	15
Rose Chelimo	Marathon	—				2:27:11 SB	1st place, gold medalist(s)
Eunice Jepkirui Kirwa	Marathon	—				2:28:17	6
Aminat Yusuf Jamal	400 metres hurdles	57.41	32	Did not advance			
Tigest Getent	3000 metres steeplechase	9:55.42	31	—		Did not advance	
Ruth Jebet	3000 metres steeplechase	9:19.52	2 Q	—		9:13.96	5
Winfred Mutile Yavi	3000 metres steeplechase	9:28.00	8 q	—		9:22.67 PB	8

Field events

Athlete	Event	Qualification		Final	
Athlete	Event	Distance	Position	Distance	Position
Noora Salem Jasim	Shot put	16.97	22	Did not advance	
