= Turks and Caicos Islands at the 2017 World Championships in Athletics =

- Flag of the Turks and Caicos Islands
- WA code: TKS
- National federation: Turks & Caicos Islands Amateur Athletic Association

in London, United Kingdom 4–13 August 2017
- Competitors: 1 (1 man) in 1 event
- Medals: Gold 0 Silver 0 Bronze 0 Total 0

World Championships in Athletics appearances
- 1983; 1987; 1991; 1993–1999; 2001; 2003; 2005–2011; 2013; 2015; 2017; 2019; 2022; 2023; 2025

The Turks and Caicos Islands competed at the 2017 World Championships in Athletics in London, United Kingdom, from 4 to 13 August 2017.

== Results ==
=== Men ===
Track and road events

Athlete	Event	Heat		Semifinal		Final	
Athlete	Event	Result	Rank	Result	Rank	Result	Rank
Ifeanyichukwu Otuonye	200 metres	21.91	44	Did not advance			
