= Bahrain at the 2015 World Championships in Athletics =

- WA code: BRN

in Beijing
- Competitors: 17
- Medals Ranked 32nd: Gold 0 Silver 0 Bronze 1 Total 1

World Championships in Athletics appearances
- 1983; 1987; 1991; 1993; 1995; 1997; 1999; 2001; 2003; 2005; 2007; 2009; 2011; 2013; 2015; 2017; 2019; 2022; 2023

Bahrain competed at the 2015 World Championships in Athletics in Beijing, China, from 22 to 30 August 2015.

== Medalists ==
The following Bahraini competitors won medals at the Championships

Medal	Athlete	Event	Date
Bronze	Eunice Kirwa	Marathon	30 August

== Results ==
(q – qualified, NM – no mark, SB – season best)

=== Men ===
Track and road events

Athlete	Event	Heat		Semifinal		Final	
Athlete	Event	Result	Rank	Result	Rank	Result	Rank
Abubakar Abbas	400 metres	45.64	5	Did not advance			
Abraham Rotich	800 metres	1:48.42	2 Q	1:48.61	5	Did not advance	
Benson Seurei	1500 metres	3:45.70	12	Did not advance			
Albert Kibichii Rop	5000 metres	13:19.61	5 Q	—		14:00.12	11
Aweke Ayalew	5000 metres	14:07.18	16	—		Did not advance	
Aweke Ayalew	10,000 metres	—				29:14.55 PB	21
El Hassan El-Abbassi	10,000 metres	—				28:12.57	12
Aadam Ismaeel Khamis	Marathon	—				DNF	
Hasan Mahboob	Marathon	—				DNF	
Shumi Dechasa	Marathon	—				2:14:36	5
Nelson Cherutich	3000 metres steeplechase	DNS		—		Did not advance	
John Kibet Koech	3000 metres steeplechase	8:38.62	8	—		Did not advance	

=== Women ===
Track and road events

Athlete	Event	Heat		Semifinal		Final	
Athlete	Event	Result	Rank	Result	Rank	Result	Rank
Mimi Belete	5000 metres	15:20.94	3 Q	—		15:17.01	11
Eunice Kirwa	Marathon	—				2:27:39	3rd place, bronze medalist(s)
Aster Tesfaye	Marathon	—				2:46:54	42
Lishan Dula	Marathon	—				2:38:18	25
Kemi Adekoya	400 metres hurdles	DQ	–	Did not advance			
Ruth Jebet	3000 metres steeplechase	9:27.93	5 q	—		9:33.41	11
