= 2011 World Championships in Athletics =

Athletics competition in Daegu, South Korea

13th IAAF World Championships in Athletics
- Host city: Daegu, South Korea
- Nations: 204
- Athletes: 1848
- Events: 47
- Dates: 27 August – 4 September 2011
- Opened by: President Lee Myung-bak
- Closed by: IAAF President Lamine Diack
- Main venue: Daegu Stadium

The 13th IAAF World Championships in Athletics (Korean: 2011년세계육상선수권대회) was an international athletics competition that was held in Daegu, South Korea. It started on 27 August 2011 and finished on 4 September 2011.

The United States topped the medal standings in the competition with 28 (12 gold, 9 silver, and 7 bronze). During the competition, 41 national records, 4 area records, 3 championship records, and 1 world record was set.

The championships were heavily affected by post-championship doping cases, particularly from the Russian team, who in subsequent years were stripped of eleven medals, seven of them gold.

== Bidding process ==
On 4 April 2006, the IAAF (now World Athletics) announced that nine countries (United States, South Korea, Australia, Sweden, Spain, Russia, the United Arab Emirates, Croatia and Morocco) had submitted expressions of interest for hosting the 2011 World Championships.

=== Candidates ===
When the seeking deadline passed on 1 December 2006, four candidate cities (Brisbane, Daegu, Moscow and Gothenburg) had confirmed their candidatures. Gothenburg backed out later that month, citing lack of financial support from the Swedish government.

Brisbane was announced as the Australian candidate with the Queensland Sport and Athletics Centre (formerly ANZ Stadium) as the proposed venue for a championships to be held in July or August. The stadium previously hosted the 1982 Commonwealth Games and 2001 Goodwill Games. Brisbane also had an unsuccessful bid for the 2009 World Championships in Athletics.

Daegu was the city chosen for the Korean bid, following on from an initial application to host the 2009 edition. Daegu had previously hosted the 2003 Summer Universiade and four matches of the 2002 FIFA World Cup. The World Championships in Athletics had never been staged in mainland Asia, although it has taken place twice in Japan.

The Russian bid had Moscow's Luzhniki Stadium as the proposed venue. The city hosted the 1980 Summer Olympics and the 2006 IAAF World Indoor Championships.

Among the intent candidates were Casablanca (Morocco) and Split (Croatia), both of which were failed bidders for the 2009 World Championships in Athletics. The Spanish candidate was rumored to be either Madrid or Valencia, but Spain eventually settled for Barcelona as a candidate for the 2013 World Championships in Athletics. The United States intent candidate city matched those bidding for the 2016 Summer Olympics: Chicago, Los Angeles or San Francisco.

=== Selection ===
The IAAF announced Daegu as the winning candidate at the IAAF Council Meeting in Mombasa on 27 March 2007. Its victory was based on "the quality of the stadiums and [meeting] the need for good crowds." IAAF's officials also praised Daegu's "ambition and challenging spirit" as key to its winning bid. Both Moscow and Brisbane later confirmed their candidacy to host the 2013 World Championships in Athletics – a selection process won by the Russian capital.

== Event schedule ==
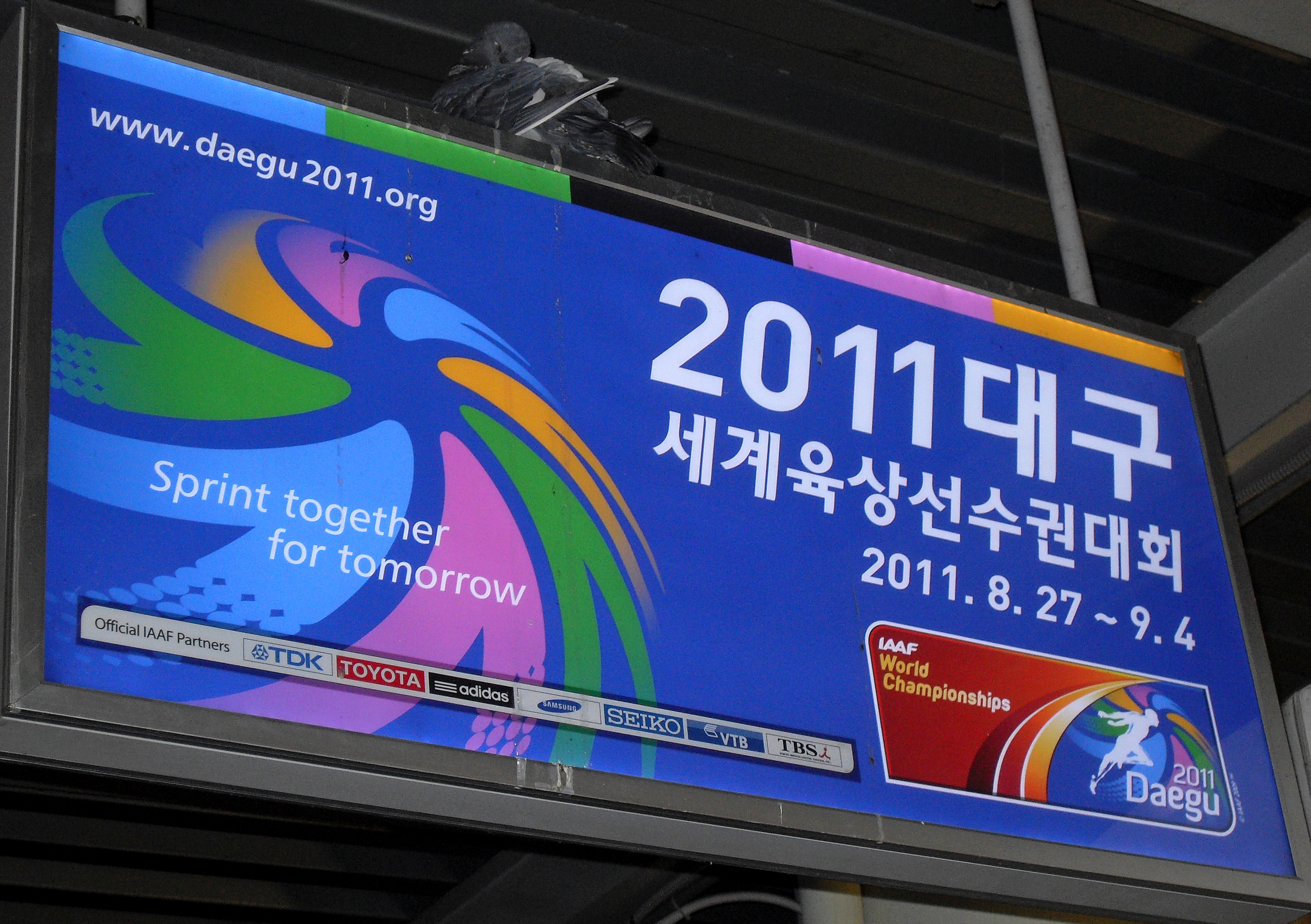
A promotional poster for the event at Dongdaegu Station
Day by day event schedule of the 2011 championships

Legend
Key	P	Q	H	½	F
Value	Preliminary round	Qualifiers	Heats	Semifinals	Final

All dates are KST (UTC+9)

Men
Date →	27 Aug		28 Aug			29 Aug			30 Aug		31 Aug		1 Sep		2 Sep		3 Sep		4 Sep		
Event ↓	M	A	M	A		M	A		M	A	M	A	M	A	M	A	M	A	M	A	
100 m	Q	H		½	F																
200 m															H	½		F			
400 m			H				½			F											
800 m	H			½						F											
1500 m									H					½				F			
5000 m													H							F	
10,000 m				F																	
Marathon																			F		
110 m hurdles			H				½	F													
400 m hurdles						H				½				F							
3000 m steeplechase						H								F							
4 × 100 m relay																				H	F
4 × 400 m relay													H			F					
20 km walk			F																		
50 km walk																	F				
Long jump													Q			F					
Triple jump															Q					F	
High jump									Q					F							
Pole vault	Q						F														
Shot put													Q			F					
Discus throw						Q				F											
Hammer throw		Q					F														
Javelin throw														Q				F			
Decathlon	F																				

Women
Date	27 Aug		28 Aug		29 Aug			30 Aug		31 Aug		1 Sep		2 Sep		3 Sep			4 Sep		
Event ↓	M	A	M	A	M	A		M	A	M	A	M	A	M	A	M	A		M	A	
100 m	Q		H			½	F														
200 m												H	½		F						
400 m		H		½		F															
800 m												H			½					F	
1500 m			H						½				F								
5000 m								H							F						
10,000 m		F																			
Marathon	F																				
100 m hurdles														H			½	F			
400 m hurdles					H				½				F								
3000 m steeplechase	H								F												
4 × 100 m relay																				H	F
4 × 400 m relay														H			F				
20 km walk										F											
-																					
Long jump		Q		F																	
Triple jump								Q					F								
High jump												Q					F				
Pole vault			Q						F												
Shot put			Q			F															
Discus throw	Q			F																	
Hammer throw														Q						F	
Javelin throw												Q			F						
Heptathlon					F																

== Results ==
=== Men ===
The events in the men's section ended with a world record in 4 × 100 metres relay set by Jamaica and several world's leading results. Jamaica dominated the sprinting events, while Kenya and Ethiopia dominated the longer track events. In the field events, the United States and Germany were most successful, winning four and three gold medals respectively. Yohan Blake and Usain Bolt, both from Jamaica, won two gold medals, being the most successful athletes in the men's events.

In the 100 m final the largely favored Usain Bolt was disqualified for a false start, enabling Yohan Blake to win the crown with a time of 9.92 s. In the 200 m Bolt won with a time of 19.40 s, which was the fastest time ever not to be a world record at that point. Blake and Bolt, along with countrymen Nesta Carter and Michael Frater, ran in the 4 × 100 metres relay, setting a new world record with a time of 37.04 s. In the 10,000 metres event, World Champion Kenenisa Bekele did not finish the race. The world record holder in 800 m, David Rudisha, won the event with his first gold medal at the World Championships. On the last day, Kenyan Abel Kirui became the third marathon winner to retain the title at the next World Championships, after Abel Anton and Jaouad Gharib.

Most of the field events ended with new winners, but Dwight Phillips retained the long jump title, becoming only the second man after Ivan Pedroso to win four golds at the World Championships in this event.

Ethiopia's Imane Merga was originally awarded the bronze medal in the Men's 5000 metres, but he was later disqualified for having run inside the curb of the running track for some 10 to 15 metres. His teammate Dejen Gebremeskel was elevated to the bronze medal as a result.

Cuba's Dayron Robles finished first in the race of the Men's 110 metres hurdles, but was disqualified for interfering with Liu Xiang twice before and over the last barrier. Jason Richardson was awarded the Gold, Liu the Silver, and Andy Turner promoted to the Bronze medal position.

==== Track ====
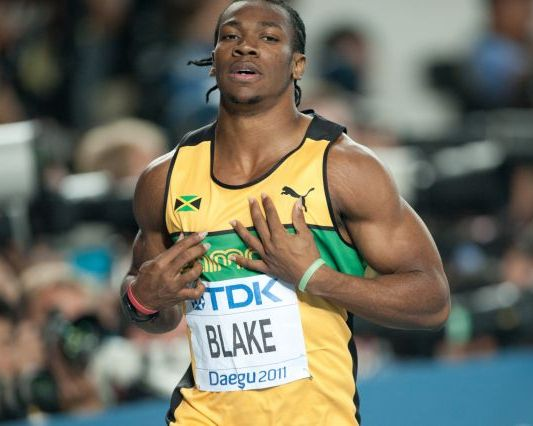
Yohan Blake of Jamaica, winner of the men's 100 metres

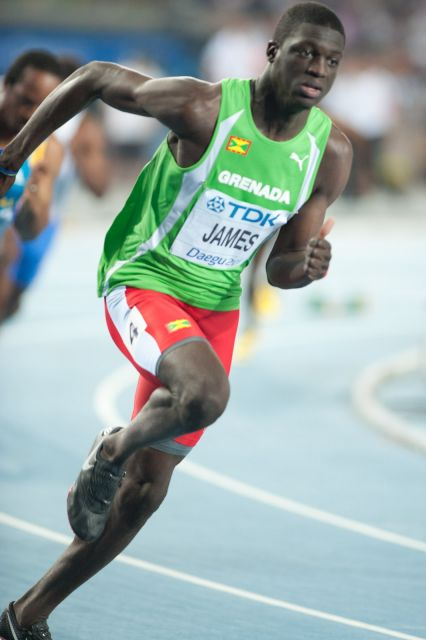
Men's 400 m champion Kirani James of Grenada

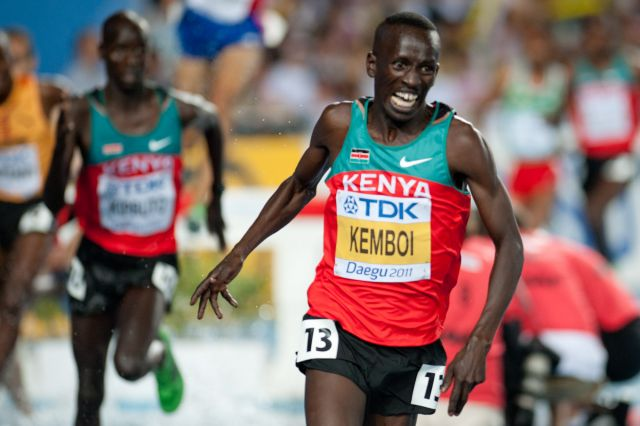
Kenya's Ezekiel Kemboi defended his steeplechase world title

Chronology: 2007 | 2009 | 2011 | 2013 | 2015

Event	Gold		Silver		Bronze	
100 metres	Yohan Blake; Jamaica (JAM)	9.92 SB	Walter Dix; United States (USA)	10.08	Kim Collins; Saint Kitts and Nevis (SKN)	10.09
200 metres	Usain Bolt; Jamaica (JAM)	19.40; WL	Walter Dix; United States (USA)	19.70; SB	Christophe Lemaitre; France (FRA)	19.80; NR
400 metres	Kirani James; Grenada (GRN)	44.60; PB	LaShawn Merritt; United States (USA)	44.63	Kévin Borlée; Belgium (BEL)	44.90
800 metres	David Rudisha; Kenya (KEN)	1:43.91	Abubaker Kaki; Sudan (SUD)	1:44.41	Yuriy Borzakovskiy; Russia (RUS)	1:44.49
1500 metres	Asbel Kiprop; Kenya (KEN)	3:35.69	Silas Kiplagat; Kenya (KEN)	3:35.92	Matthew Centrowitz; United States (USA)	3:36.08
5000 metres	Mo Farah; Great Britain & N.I. (GBR)	13:23.36	Bernard Lagat; United States (USA)	13:23.64	Dejen Gebremeskel; Ethiopia (ETH)	13:23.92
5000 metres	Mo Farah; Great Britain & N.I. (GBR)	13:23.36	Bernard Lagat; United States (USA)	13:23.64	Imane Merga; Ethiopia (ETH)	13:23.78
10,000 metres	Ibrahim Jeilan; Ethiopia (ETH)	27:13.81	Mo Farah; Great Britain & N.I. (GBR)	27:14.07	Imane Merga; Ethiopia (ETH)	27:19.14
Marathon	Abel Kirui; Kenya (KEN)	2:07:38; SB	Vincent Kipruto; Kenya (KEN)	2:10:06	Feyisa Lilesa; Ethiopia (ETH)	2:10:32; SB
110 metres hurdles	Jason Richardson; United States (USA)	13.16	Liu Xiang; China (CHN)	13.27	Andy Turner; Great Britain & N.I. (GBR)	13.44
400 metres hurdles	Dai Greene; Great Britain & N.I. (GBR)	48.26	Javier Culson; Puerto Rico (PUR)	48.44	L. J. van Zyl; South Africa (RSA)	48.80
3000 metres steeplechase	Ezekiel Kemboi; Kenya (KEN)	8:14.85	Brimin Kipruto; Kenya (KEN)	8:16.05	Mahiedine Mekhissi-Benabbad; France (FRA)	8:16.09
20 kilometres walk	Luis Fernando López; Colombia (COL)	1:20:38; SB	Wang Zhen; China (CHN)	1:20:54	Kim Hyun-sub; South Korea (KOR)	1:21:17
20 kilometres walk	Valeriy Borchin; Russia (RUS)	1:19:56	Vladimir Kanaykin; Russia (RUS)	1:20:27	Kim Hyun-sub; South Korea (KOR)	1:21:17
50 kilometres walk	Denis Nizhegorodov; Russia (RUS)	3:42:45; SB	Jared Tallent; Australia (AUS)	3:43:36; SB	Si Tianfeng; China (CHN)	3:44:40
50 kilometres walk	Sergey Bakulin; Russia (RUS)	3:41:24	Jared Tallent; Australia (AUS)	3:43:36; SB	Si Tianfeng; China (CHN)	3:44:40
4 × 100 metres relay	Jamaica; Nesta Carter; Michael Frater; Yohan Blake; Usain Bolt; Dexter Lee*	37.04; WR	France; Teddy Tinmar; Christophe Lemaitre; Yannick Lesourd; Jimmy Vicaut	38.20; SB	Saint Kitts and Nevis; Jason Rogers; Kim Collins; Antoine Adams; Brijesh Lawrence	38.49
4 × 400 metres relay	United States; Greg Nixon; Bershawn Jackson; Angelo Taylor; LaShawn Merritt; Jamaal Torrance*; Michael Berry*	2:59.31; WL	South Africa; Shane Victor; Ofentse Mogawane; Willem de Beer; L. J. van Zyl; Oscar Pistorius*	2:59.87	Jamaica; Allodin Fothergill; Jermaine Gonzales; Riker Hylton; Leford Green; Lansford Spence*	3:00.10
WR world record | AR area record | CR championship record | GR games record | NR national record | OR Olympic record | PB personal best | SB season best | WL world leading (in a given season) | * Runners who participated in the heats only and received medals.

==== Field ====
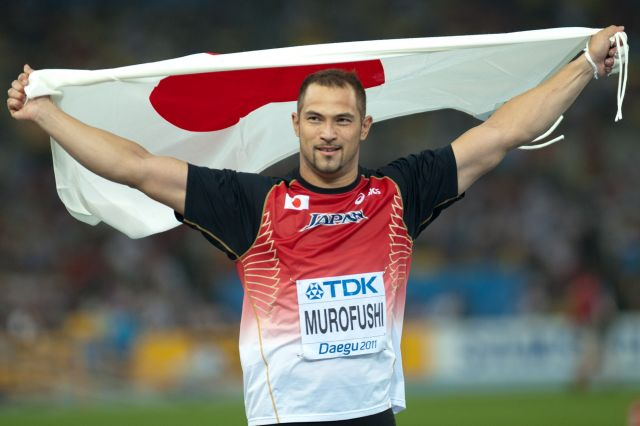
Koji Murofushi of Japan won the men's hammer

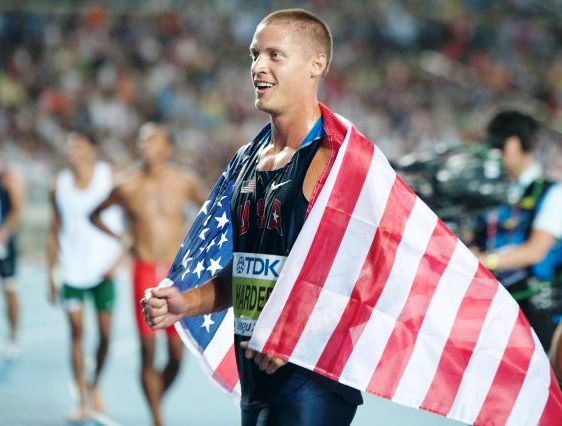
Decathlon champion Trey Hardee

Chronology: 2007 | 2009 | 2011 | 2013 | 2015

Event	Gold		Silver		Bronze	
High jump	Jesse Williams; United States (USA)	2.35	Aleksey Dmitrik; Russia (RUS)	2.35	Trevor Barry; Bahamas (BAH)	2.32; PB
Pole vault	Paweł Wojciechowski; Poland (POL)	5.90	Lázaro Borges; Cuba (CUB)	5.90; NR	Renaud Lavillenie; France (FRA)	5.85
Long jump	Dwight Phillips; United States (USA)	8.45; SB	Mitchell Watt; Australia (AUS)	8.33	Ngonidzashe Makusha; Zimbabwe (ZIM)	8.29
Triple jump	Christian Taylor; United States (USA)	17.96; WL	Phillips Idowu; Great Britain & N.I. (GBR)	17.77; SB	Will Claye; United States (USA)	17.50; PB
Shot put	David Storl; Germany (GER)	21.78; PB	Dylan Armstrong; Canada (CAN)	21.64	Christian Cantwell; United States (USA)	21.36
Shot put	David Storl; Germany (GER)	21.78; PB	Dylan Armstrong; Canada (CAN)	21.64	Andrei Mikhnevich; Belarus (BLR)	21.40
Discus throw	Robert Harting; Germany (GER)	68.97	Gerd Kanter; Estonia (EST)	66.95	Ehsan Haddadi; Iran (IRI)	66.08; SB
Javelin throw	Matthias de Zordo; Germany (GER)	86.27; SB	Andreas Thorkildsen; Norway (NOR)	84.78	Guillermo Martínez; Cuba (CUB)	84.30
Hammer throw	Koji Murofushi; Japan (JPN)	81.24; SB	Krisztián Pars; Hungary (HUN)	81.18; SB	Primož Kozmus; Slovenia (SLO)	79.39; SB
Decathlon	Trey Hardee; United States (USA)	8607	Ashton Eaton; United States (USA)	8505	Leonel Suárez; Cuba (CUB)	8501; SB
WR world record | AR area record | CR championship record | GR games record | NR national record | OR Olympic record | PB personal best | SB season best | WL world leading (in a given season)

=== Women ===
During the championships, Russia was the most successful country in the women's events, winning seven gold medals, followed by the United States with six. Most successful female athlete was Allyson Felix having won two relay golds and silver and bronze in her individual events. On the first day of the Championships, the athletes of Kenya made an astonishing performance, winning all six medals available in the two events. Kenya also dominated the long-distance events, while Jamaica and the United States the sprinting. In the field events, Russia was initially dominant, winning four gold medals.

Following a series of retests of stored samples and biological passports, a number of athletes were stripped of medals because of doping. Nine medals in eight events were forfeited for doping, eight of them from Russia, including five gold medals. The only Russian medals that survived the post-championship doping purge were two gold medals in the high jump and the hammer throw, and a bronze medals in the pole vault and the 400 metres hurdles. Of the four surviving medalists, a further three were eventually banned for doping.

The amended results left the United States the clear leading nation in women's athletics.

==== Track ====
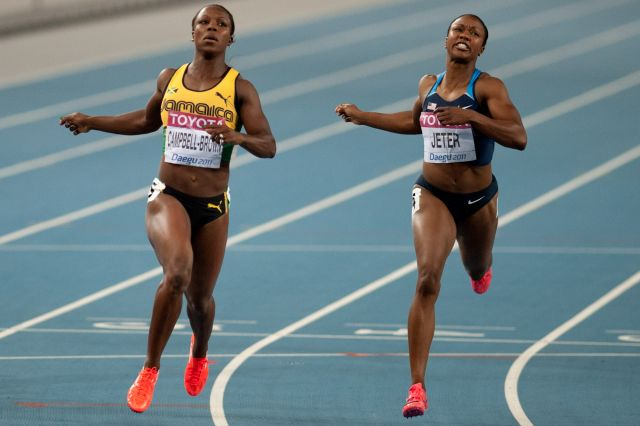
Veronica Campbell-Brown and Carmelita Jeter were the top two in both the women's short sprints.

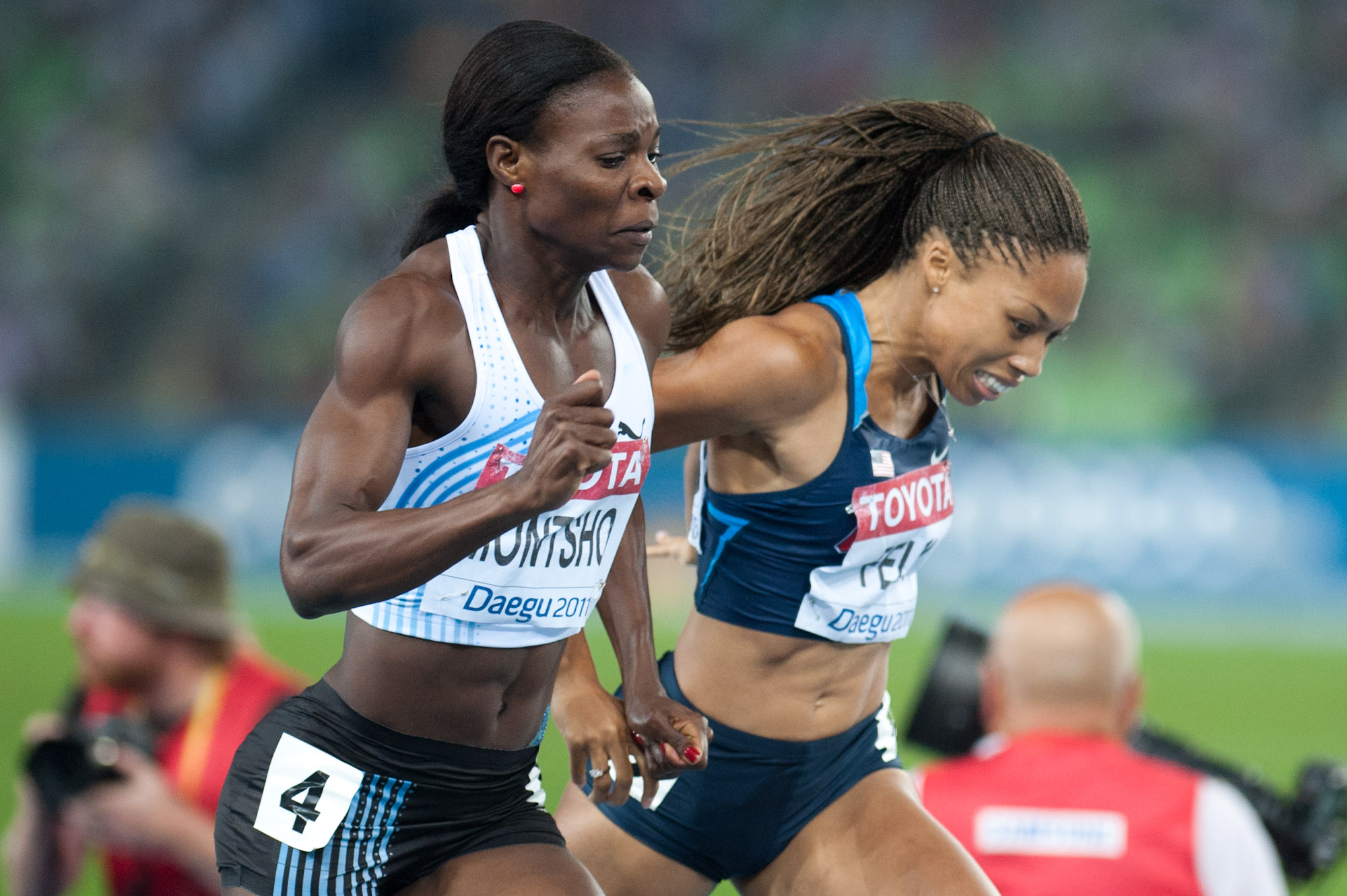
Amantle Montsho narrowly defeated Allyson Felix to become Botswana's first World or Olympic track and field champion

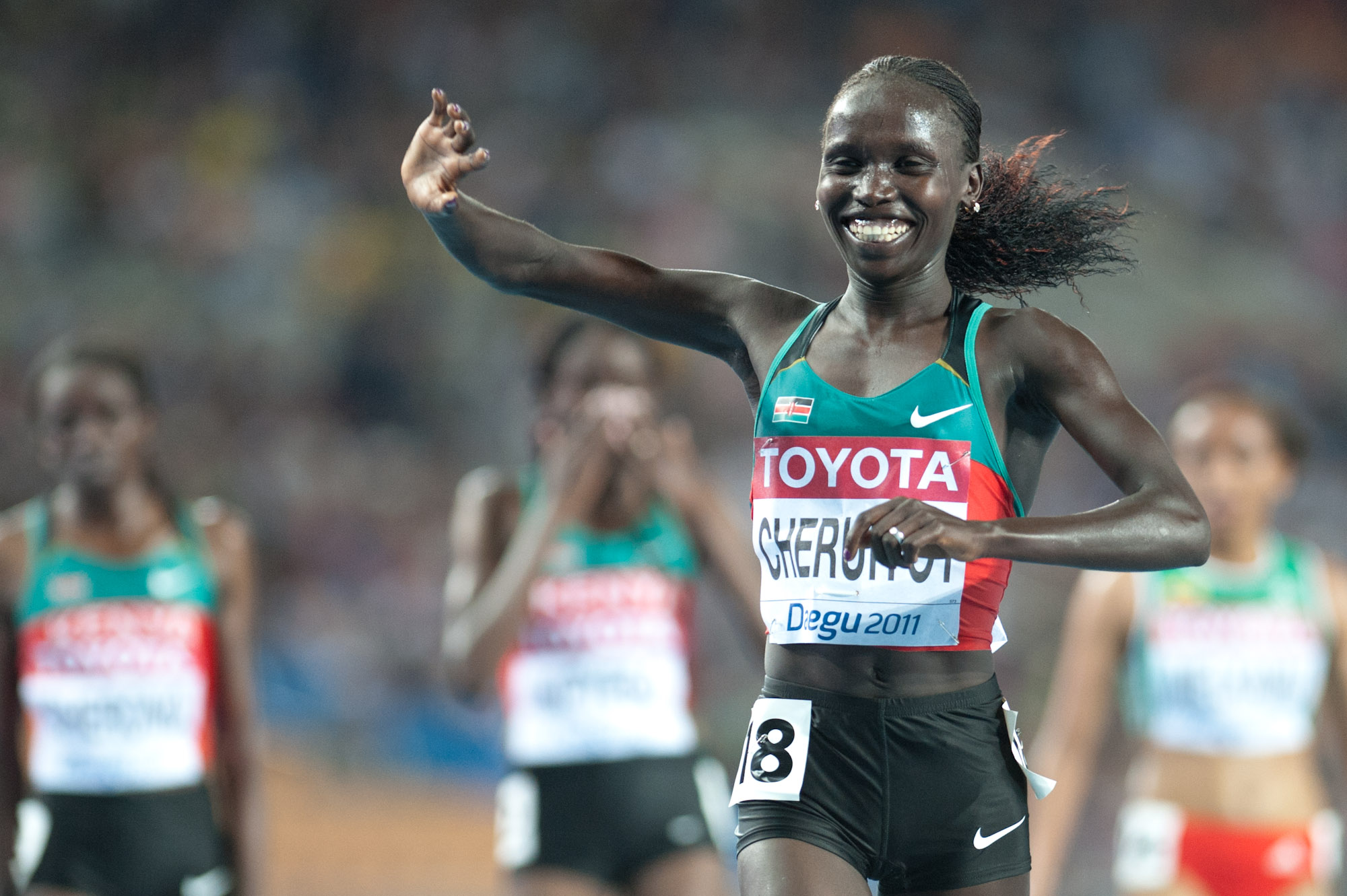
Vivian Cheruiyot of Kenya won both the 5000 and 10,000 m

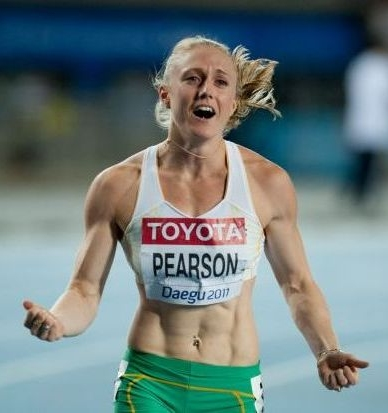
Australian Sally Pearson won the 100 m hurdles in a championships record time.

Chronology: 2007 | 2009 | 2011 | 2013 | 2015

Event	Gold		Silver		Bronze	
100 metres	Carmelita Jeter; United States (USA)	10.90	Veronica Campbell-Brown; Jamaica (JAM)	10.97	Kelly-Ann Baptiste; Trinidad and Tobago (TRI)	10.98
200 metres	Veronica Campbell-Brown; Jamaica (JAM)	22.22; SB	Carmelita Jeter; United States (USA)	22.37	Allyson Felix; United States (USA)	22.42
400 metres	Amantle Montsho; Botswana (BOT)	49.56; NR	Allyson Felix; United States (USA)	49.59; PB	Francena McCorory; United States (USA)	50.45
800 metres	Caster Semenya; South Africa (RSA)	1:56.35; SB	Janeth Jepkosgei; Kenya (KEN)	1:57.42; SB	Alysia Johnson Montaño; United States (USA)	1:57.48; SB
800 metres	Mariya Savinova; Russia (RUS)	1:55.87	Janeth Jepkosgei; Kenya (KEN)	1:57.42; SB	Alysia Johnson Montaño; United States (USA)	1:57.48; SB
1500 metres	Jennifer Simpson; United States (USA)	4:05.40	Hannah England; Great Britain & N.I. (GBR)	4:05.68	Natalia Rodríguez; Spain (ESP)	4:05.87
5000 metres	Vivian Cheruiyot; Kenya (KEN)	14:55.36	Sylvia Jebiwott Kibet; Kenya (KEN)	14:56.21	Meseret Defar; Ethiopia (ETH)	14:56.94
10,000 metres	Vivian Cheruiyot; Kenya (KEN)	30:48.98	Sally Kipyego; Kenya (KEN)	30:50.04	Linet Masai; Kenya (KEN)	30:53.59
Marathon	Edna Kiplagat; Kenya (KEN)	2:28:43	Priscah Jeptoo; Kenya (KEN)	2:29:00	Sharon Cherop; Kenya (KEN)	2:29:14; SB
100 metres hurdles	Sally Pearson; Australia (AUS)	12.28; CR, AR	Danielle Carruthers; United States (USA)	12.47; PB	Dawn Harper; United States (USA)	12.47; PB
400 metres hurdles	Lashinda Demus; United States (USA)	52.47; WL, NR	Melaine Walker; Jamaica (JAM)	52.73; SB	Natalya Antyukh; Russia (RUS)	53.85
3000 metres steeplechase	Habiba Ghribi; Tunisia (TUN)	9:11.97; NR	Milcah Chemos Cheywa; Kenya (KEN)	9:17.16	Mercy Wanjiku; Kenya (KEN)	9:17.88
3000 metres steeplechase	Yuliya Zarudneva Zaripova; Russia (RUS)	9:07.03; WL	Milcah Chemos Cheywa; Kenya (KEN)	9:17.16	Mercy Wanjiku; Kenya (KEN)	9:17.88
20 kilometres walk	Liu Hong; China (CHN)	1:30:00	Elisa Rigaudo; Italy (ITA)	1:30:44; SB	Qieyang Shenjie; China (CHN)	1:31:14
20 kilometres walk	Olga Kaniskina; Russia (RUS)	1:29:42	Elisa Rigaudo; Italy (ITA)	1:30:44; SB	Anisya Kirdyapkina; Russia (RUS)	1:30:13
4 × 100 metres relay	United States; Bianca Knight; Allyson Felix; Marshevet Myers; Carmelita Jeter; Shalonda Solomon*; Alexandria Anderson*	41.56; WL	Jamaica; Shelly-Ann Fraser-Pryce; Kerron Stewart; Sherone Simpson; Veronica Campbell-Brown; Jura Levy*	41.70; NR	Ukraine; Olesya Povh; Nataliya Pohrebnyak; Mariya Ryemyen; Hrystyna Stuy	42.51; SB
4 × 400 metres relay	United States; Sanya Richards-Ross; Allyson Felix; Jessica Beard; Francena McCorory; Natasha Hastings*; Keshia Baker*	3:18.09; WL	Jamaica; Rosemarie Whyte; Davita Prendergast; Novlene Williams-Mills; Shericka Williams; Shereefa Lloyd*; Patricia Hall*	3:18.71; NR	Great Britain & N.I. Perri Shakes-Drayton; Nicola Sanders; Christine Ohuruogu; Lee McConnell	3:23.63
4 × 400 metres relay	United States; Sanya Richards-Ross; Allyson Felix; Jessica Beard; Francena McCorory; Natasha Hastings*; Keshia Baker*	3:18.09; WL	Jamaica; Rosemarie Whyte; Davita Prendergast; Novlene Williams-Mills; Shericka Williams; Shereefa Lloyd*; Patricia Hall*	3:18.71; NR	Russia; Antonina Krivoshapka; Natalya Antyukh; Lyudmila Litvinova; Anastasiya Kapachinskaya; Kseniya Vdovina*; Ksenia Zadorina*	3:19.36
WR world record | AR area record | CR championship record | GR games record | NR national record | OR Olympic record | PB personal best | SB season best | WL world leading (in a given season) * Runners who participated in the heats only and received medals.

==== Field ====
Chronology: 2007 | 2009 | 2011 | 2013 | 2015

Event	Gold		Silver		Bronze	
High jump	Anna Chicherova; Russia (RUS)	2.03	Blanka Vlašić; Croatia (CRO)	2.03; SB	Antonietta Di Martino; Italy (ITA)	2.00
Pole vault	Fabiana Murer; Brazil (BRA)	4.85; AR	Martina Strutz; Germany (GER)	4.80; NR	Svetlana Feofanova; Russia (RUS)	4.75; SB
Long jump	Brittney Reese; United States (USA)	6.82	Ineta Radēviča; Latvia (LAT)	6.76	Nastassia Mironchyk-Ivanova; Belarus (BLR)	6.74
Long jump	Brittney Reese; United States (USA)	6.82	Olga Kucherenko; Russia (RUS)	6.77	Nastassia Mironchyk-Ivanova; Belarus (BLR)	6.74
Triple jump	Olha Saladukha; Ukraine (UKR)	14.94	Olga Rypakova; Kazakhstan (KAZ)	14.89	Caterine Ibargüen; Colombia (COL)	14.84
Shot put	Valerie Adams; New Zealand (NZL)	21.24; CR, AR	Jillian Camarena-Williams; United States (USA)	20.02	Gong Lijiao; China (CHN)	19.97
Shot put	Valerie Adams; New Zealand (NZL)	21.24; CR, AR	Nadzeya Ostapchuk; Belarus (BLR)	20.05	Gong Lijiao; China (CHN)	19.97
Discus throw	Li Yanfeng; China (CHN)	66.52	Nadine Müller; Germany (GER)	65.97	Yarelis Barrios; Cuba (CUB)	65.73; SB
Javelin throw^{[a]}	Barbora Špotáková; Czech Republic (CZE)	71.58; SB	Sunette Viljoen; South Africa (RSA)	68.38; AR	Christina Obergföll; Germany (GER)	65.24
Javelin throw^{[a]}	Mariya Abakumova; Russia (RUS)	71.99; CR, NR, WL	Sunette Viljoen; South Africa (RSA)	68.38; AR	Christina Obergföll; Germany (GER)	65.24
Hammer throw	Tatyana Lysenko; Russia (RUS)	77.13; SB	Betty Heidler; Germany (GER)	76.06	Zhang Wenxiu; China (CHN)	75.03
Heptathlon^{[b]}	Jessica Ennis; Great Britain & N.I. (GBR)	6751	Jennifer Oeser; Germany (GER)	6572	Karolina Tymińska; Poland (POL)	6544
Heptathlon^{[b]}	Tatyana Chernova; Russia (RUS)	6880; WL	Jennifer Oeser; Germany (GER)	6572	Karolina Tymińska; Poland (POL)	6544
WR world record | AR area record | CR championship record | GR games record | NR national record | OR Olympic record | PB personal best | SB season best | WL world leading (in a given season)

^{Javelin} Original gold medalist Mariya Abakumova of Russia was stripped of her gold medal.
^{Heptathlon} Original gold medalist Tatyana Chernova of Russia was stripped of her gold medal on 29 November 2016 by the Court of Arbitration for Sport, with Ennis and Oeser promoted to gold and silver respectively and the bronze awarded to Karolina Tymińska of Poland.

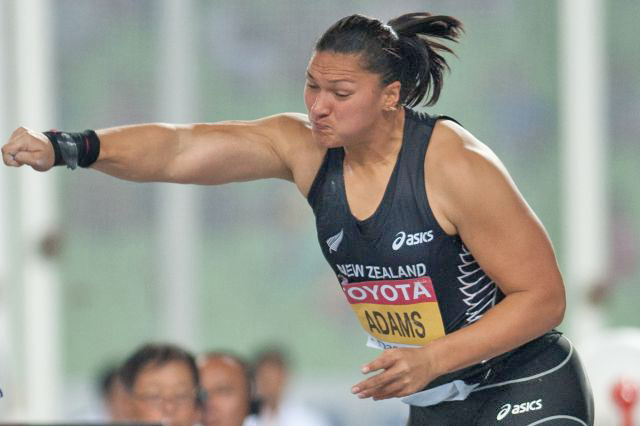
Valerie Adams broke the championship record in the shot put.

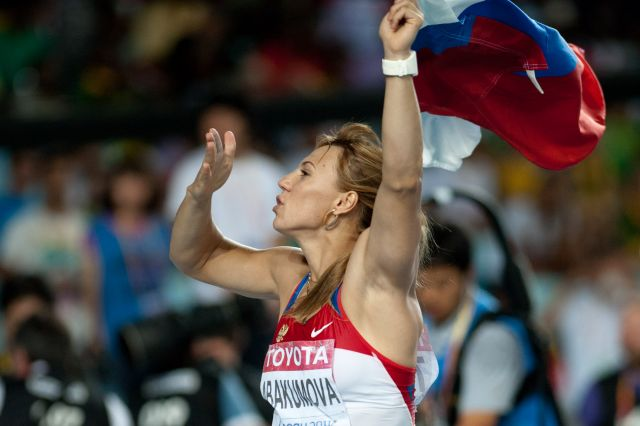
Mariya Abakumova improved the championship and Russian record in javelin.

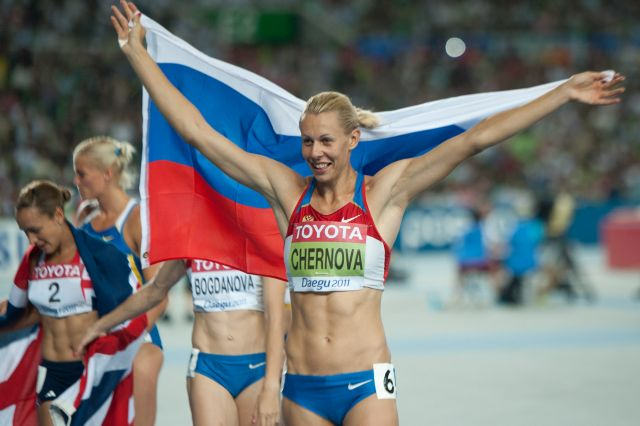
Tatyana Chernova defeated the defending heptathlon champion Jessica Ennis, but was disqualified in 2016 for doping offences.

== Anti-doping programme ==
On 4 November 2011 the IAAF reported that 2 of the 468 urine samples had produced adverse analytical findings. The samples of Portuguese runner Sara Moreira, a finalist in the women's steeplechase, and Korean relay runner Hee-Nam Lim had both tested positive for methylhexaneamine. Analysis of blood samples is still ongoing.

In March 2012 the Trinidad and Tobago track and field authorities announced that Semoy Hackett had tested positive for methylhexaneamine at the Trinidad and Tobago national championships prior to the World Championships. Her results in the women's 100 metres were annulled and the Trinidadian 4 × 100-metres relay team were also disqualified from fourth place.

An anonymous poll conducted by the World Anti-Doping Agency at the event showed that an estimated 29% of the athletes present at the World Championships had used a banned substance within the last 12 months.

== Medal table ==
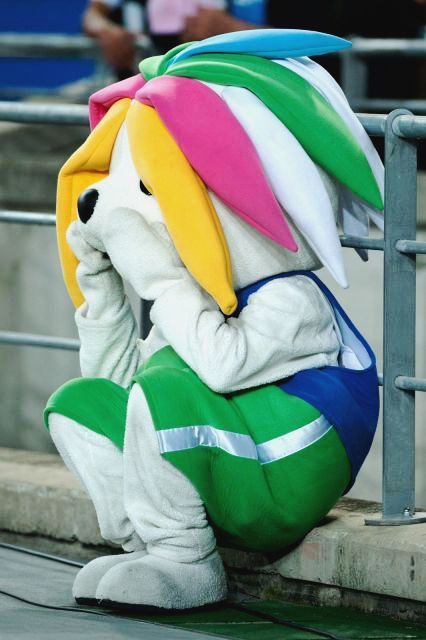
Mascot

Originally, host nation South Korea failed to win any medals at these championships, a fate shared with Sweden in 1995 and Canada in 2001. However, in 2015, South Korean athlete Kim Hyun-sub was promoted from sixth place to bronze medalist in the 20 km walk after three Russian race walkers were disqualified for doping offences.

Key

* Host nation (South Korea)

Rank	Nation	Gold	Silver	Bronze	Total
1	United States	12	9	7	28
2	Kenya	7	8	3	18
3	Jamaica	4	4	1	9
4	Germany	3	4	1	8
5	Great Britain & N.I.	3	3	2	8
6	Russia	3	1	3	7
7	China	2	2	4	8
8	South Africa	1	2	1	4
9	Australia	1	2	0	3
10	Ethiopia	1	0	4	5
11	Colombia	1	0	1	2
11	Poland	1	0	1	2
11	Ukraine	1	0	1	2
14	Botswana	1	0	0	1
14	Brazil	1	0	0	1
14	Czech Republic	1	0	0	1
14	Grenada	1	0	0	1
14	Japan	1	0	0	1
14	New Zealand	1	0	0	1
14	Tunisia	1	0	0	1
21	Cuba	0	1	3	4
21	France	0	1	3	4
23	Italy	0	1	1	2
24	Canada	0	1	0	1
24	Croatia	0	1	0	1
24	Estonia	0	1	0	1
24	Hungary	0	1	0	1
24	Kazakhstan	0	1	0	1
24	Latvia	0	1	0	1
24	Norway	0	1	0	1
24	Puerto Rico	0	1	0	1
24	Sudan	0	1	0	1
33	Saint Kitts and Nevis	0	0	2	2
34	Bahamas	0	0	1	1
34	Belarus	0	0	1	1
34	Belgium	0	0	1	1
34	Iran	0	0	1	1
34	Slovenia	0	0	1	1
34	South Korea*	0	0	1	1
34	Spain	0	0	1	1
34	Trinidad and Tobago	0	0	1	1
34	Zimbabwe	0	0	1	1
Totals (42 entries)		47	47	47	141

List of official changes by country
Country	Gold	Silver	Bronze	Net Change
Russia	-6	−3	−2	−11
Belarus	0	−1	0	−1
Australia	0	+1	-1	0
Latvia	0	+1	-1	0
Colombia	+1	−1	0	0
Czech Republic	+1	−1	0	0
Tunisia	+1	−1	0	0
South Africa	+1	0	-1	0
Poland	0	0	+1	+1
South Korea	0	0	+1	+1
Germany	0	+1	0	+1
Italy	0	+1	0	+1
Kenya	0	+2	-1	+1
United States	0	+1	+1	+2
China	+1	0	+2	+3

== Participating nations ==
On the entry lists prior to the competition, a total of 1943 athletes from 202 national teams were set to participate in the 2011 World Championships in Athletics. The number of accredited athletes that actually participated at the event was 1848, while the total of countries represented was 204.

1. Afghanistan (1)
2. Albania (1)
3. Algeria (10)
4. American Samoa (2)
5. Angola (2)
6. Anguilla (2)
7. Antigua and Barbuda (2)
8. Argentina (6)
9. Armenia (2)
10. Aruba (2)
11. Australia (41)
12. Austria (4)
13. Azerbaijan (1)
14. Bahamas (17)
15. Bahrain (11)
16. Bangladesh (1)
17. Barbados (4)
18. Belarus (22)
19. Belgium (9)
20. Belize (2)
21. Benin (2)
22. Bermuda (1)
23. Bhutan (1)
24. Bolivia (2)
25. Bosnia and Herzegovina (2)
26. Botswana (3)
27. Brazil (26)
28. British Virgin Islands (1)
29. Brunei (1)
30. Bulgaria (7)
31. Burkina Faso (2)
32. Burundi (2)
33. Cambodia (1)
34. Cameroon (2)
35. Canada (28)
36. Cape Verde (1)
37. Cayman Islands (1)
38. Central African Republic (1)
39. Chad (2)
40. Chile (3)
41. China (54)
42. Colombia (20)
43. Comoros (2)
44. Congo (1)
45. DR Congo (2)
46. Cook Islands (1)
47. Costa Rica (2)
48. Ivory Coast (2)
49. Croatia (6)
50. Cuba (31)
51. Cyprus (2)
52. Czech Republic (21)
53. Denmark (6)
54. Djibouti (2)
55. Dominica (1)
56. Dominican Republic (4)
57. Ecuador (5)
58. Egypt (5)
59. El Salvador (2)
60. Equatorial Guinea (0)
61. Eritrea (9)
62. Estonia (9)
63. Ethiopia (34)
64. Federated States of Micronesia (2)
65. Fiji (1)
66. Finland (13)
67. France (39)
68. French Polynesia (1)
69. Gabon (2)
70. Gambia (2)
71. Germany (65)
72. Ghana (6)
73. Gibraltar (1)
74. Great Britain & N.I. (59)
75. Greece (12)
76. Grenada (3)
77. Guam (2)
78. Guatemala (2)
79. Guinea (2)
80. Guinea-Bissau (2)
81. Guyana (1)
82. Haiti (3)
83. Honduras (2)
84. Hong Kong (2)
85. Hungary (12)
86. Iceland (2)
87. India (8)
88. Indonesia (2)
89. Iran (7)
90. Iraq (1)
91. Ireland (16)
92. Israel (4)
93. Italy (30)
94. Jamaica (45)
95. Japan (48)
96. Kazakhstan (14)
97. Kenya (47)
98. Kiribati (2)
99. South Korea (53) (Hosts)
100. Kuwait (2)
101. Kyrgyzstan (2)
102. Laos (2)
103. Latvia (13)
104. Lebanon (1)
105. Lesotho (2)
106. Liberia (2)
107. Libya (1)
108. Lithuania (15)
109. Macau (1)
110. Macedonia (1)
111. Madagascar (1)
112. Malawi (2)
113. Malaysia (2)
114. Maldives (2)
115. Mali (2)
116. Malta (2)
117. Marshall Islands (0)
118. Mauritania (2)
119. Mauritius (2)
120. Mexico (10)
121. Moldova (3)
122. Monaco (1)
123. Mongolia (2)
124. Montenegro (2)
125. Morocco (19)
126. Mozambique (2)
127. Myanmar (1)
128. Namibia (2)
129. Nauru (2)
130. Nepal (2)
131. Netherlands (17)
132. New Zealand (8)
133. Nicaragua (2)
134. Niger (2)
135. Nigeria (15)
136. Northern Mariana Islands (2)
137. Norway (13)
138. Oman (1)
139. Pakistan (1)
140. Palau (2)
141. Palestine (1)
142. Panama (2)
143. Papua New Guinea (2)
144. Paraguay (1)
145. Peru (5)
146. Philippines (2)
147. Poland (37)
148. Portugal (25)
149. Puerto Rico (8)
150. Qatar (4)
151. Romania (8)
152. Russia (76)
153. Rwanda (2)
154. Saint Kitts and Nevis (4)
155. Saint Lucia (2)
156. Saint Vincent and the Grenadines (1)
157. Samoa (1)
158. San Marino (2)
159. São Tomé and Príncipe (2)
160. Saudi Arabia (8)
161. Senegal (2)
162. Serbia (9)
163. Seychelles (2)
164. Sierra Leone (2)
165. Singapore (2)
166. Slovakia (8)
167. Slovenia (9)
168. Solomon Islands (2)
169. Somalia (1)
170. South Africa (32)
171. Spain (43)
172. Sri Lanka (2)
173. Sudan (3)
174. Suriname (2)
175. Swaziland (2)
176. Sweden (16)
177. Switzerland (15)
178. Syria (1)
179. Chinese Taipei (7)
180. Tajikistan (2)
181. Tanzania (1)
182. Thailand (6)
183. Timor-Leste (1)
184. Togo (1)
185. Tonga (2)
186. Trinidad and Tobago (16)
187. Tunisia (5)
188. Turkey (20)
189. Turkmenistan (2)
190. Turks and Caicos Islands (0)
191. Tuvalu (2)
192. Uganda (12)
193. Ukraine (55)
194. United Arab Emirates (2)
195. United States (127)
196. Uruguay (2)
197. U.S. Virgin Islands (3)
198. Uzbekistan (7)
199. Vanuatu (2)
200. Venezuela (3)
201. Vietnam (1)
202. Yemen (2)
203. Zambia (3)
204. Zimbabwe (4)

== See also ==
Athletics WikiProject

- 2011 IPC Athletics World Championships
