= Turks and Caicos Islands at the 2015 World Championships in Athletics =

- WA code: TKS

in Beijing
- Competitors: 1
- Medals: Gold 0 Silver 0 Bronze 0 Total 0

World Championships in Athletics appearances
- 1983; 1987; 1991; 1993–1999; 2001; 2003; 2005–2011; 2013; 2015; 2017; 2019; 2022; 2023; 2025

Turks and Caicos Islands competed at the 2015 World Championships in Athletics in Beijing, China, from 22 to 30 August 2015.

== Results ==
(q – qualified, NM – no mark, SB – season best)

=== Men ===
Field events

| Athlete | Event | Qualification | | Final | |
| Athlete | Event | Distance | Position | Distance | Position |
|---|---|---|---|---|---|
| Ifeanye Otuonye | Long jump | NM | | did not advance | |
