= Yanique Haye-Smith =

Jamaican and Turks and Caicos hurdler

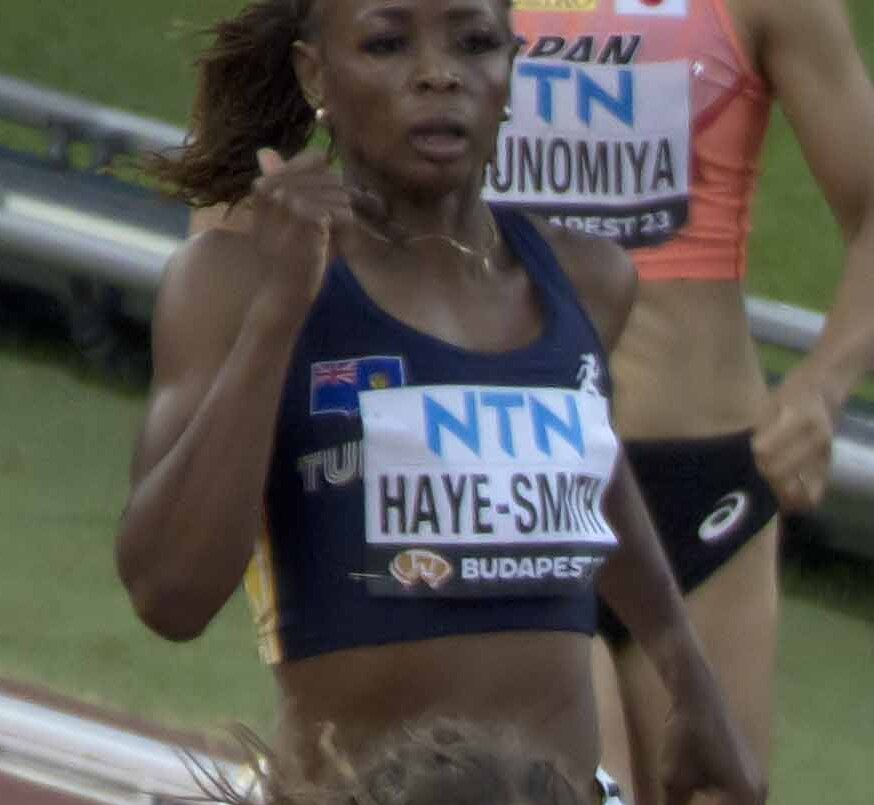
- Yanique Haye-Smith in 2023

Personal information
- Born: February 22, 1990 (age 36) Jamaica

Sport
- Sport: Track and field
- Event: 400 m hurdles
Medal record
Representing Jamaica
NACAC U-23 Championships
Bronze medal – third place	2012 Irapuato	4x400 m relay

Yanique Haye-Smith (born February 22, 1990) is a Jamaican born Turks and Caicos islander track and field athlete specializing in the 400 metres hurdles. Haye-Smith represented Jamaica until November 2018, when she switched allegiance to Turks and Caicos. She represented Turks and Caicos at the 2019 World Athletics Championships. Haye-Smith competed for Lincoln University in Jefferson City, Missouri.

In 2022, Haye-Smith also competed at the 2022 World Athletics Indoor Championships – Women's 400 metres in Belgrade, Serbia.

== Personal records ==
- 200 meters – 23.42 (-0.4), (Montverde, Florida 2018)
- 400 metres – 52.25 (Montverde, Florida 2018)
- 400 metres hurdles – 55.58 (Montverde, Florida 2019) NR

Indoor

- 60 metres – 7.63 (Virginia Beach 2021) NR
- 200 metres – 23.71 (Boston 2019) NR
- 400 metres – 52.72 (Boston 2019) NR
