= Turks & Caicos Islands Amateur Athletic Association =

Governing body for athletics in Turks and Caicos Islands

- Sport: Athletics
- Jurisdiction: Association
- Abbreviation: TCAAA
- Founded: 1977
- Affiliation: IAAF
- Affiliation date: 1978
- Regional affiliation: NACAC
- Headquarters: Grand Turk
- President: Edith Skippings
- Vice president: Alvirto A. A. Smith
- Secretary: Rosalie Ingham

Official website
- tciathletics.com
- (Turks and Caicos Islands)

The Turks & Caicos Islands Amateur Athletic Association (TCIAAA) is the governing body for the sport of athletics in the Turks and Caicos Islands. The current president is Edith Skippings. She was elected in 2011.

== History ==
TCIAAA was founded in 1977 and was affiliated with the IAAF in 1978.

== Affiliations ==
TCIAAA is the national member federation for the Turks and Caicos Islands in the following international organisations:

- International Association of Athletics Federations (IAAF)
- North American, Central American and Caribbean Athletic Association (NACAC)
- Association of Panamerican Athletics (APA)
- Central American and Caribbean Athletic Confederation (CACAC)

Moreover, it is part of the following national organisations:

- Turks & Caicos Islands Olympic Committee (TCIOC)

However, the TCIOC is not recognised by the IOC. After modifying its Charter in 1992, only Olympic Committees representing independent states are admitted as new IOC members.

== National records ==
TCIAAA maintains the Turks and Caicos Islands records in athletics.
