= Iran at the World Athletics Championships =

- Flag of Iran
- WA code: IRI
- Medals: Gold 0 Silver 0 Bronze 1 Total 1

World Athletics Championships appearances (overview)
- 1983; 1987; 1991; 1993; 1995; 1997; 1999; 2001; 2003; 2005; 2007; 2009; 2011; 2013; 2015; 2017; 2019; 2022; 2023; 2025

Iran has firstly competed at World Athletic Championships since 1983, with some absences in some editions. Being present more regularly in the 21st century, they achieved their first and only medal at the 2011 Daegu World Athletics Championships, when Ehsan Hadadi finished third in the men's discus throw. Since then, they've only achieved a finalists position once.

== Medalists ==
Medal	Name	Year	Event
Bronze	Ehsan Haddadi	2011 Daegu	Men's discus throw

=== By event ===
Event	Gold	Silver	Bronze	Total
Discus Throw	0	0	1	1
Totals (1 entries)	0	0	1	1

=== By gender ===
Gender	Gold	Silver	Bronze	Total
Men	0	0	1	1
Women	0	0	0	0

== See also ==
- Iran at the Olympics
- Iran at the Paralympics
