= Russia at the 2011 World Championships in Athletics =

- WA code: RUS
- National federation: All-Russia Athletic Federation
- Website: eng.rusathletics.com

in Daegu
- Competitors: 76
- Medals: Gold 3 Silver 1 Bronze 3 Total 7

World Championships in Athletics appearances (overview)
- 1993; 1995; 1997; 1999; 2001; 2003; 2005; 2007; 2009; 2011; 2013; 2015; 2017–2025

Other related appearances
- Authorised Neutral Athletes (2017–pres.)

Russia competed at the 2011 World Championships in Athletics from August 27 to September 4 in Daegu, South Korea.

== Team selection ==
The All-Russia Athletic Federation has announced a squad of 83 athletes. Among the team of 34 men and 49 women are defending World champions Yaroslav Rybakov (High Jump), Valeriy Borchin (20 km Race Walk), Sergey Kirdyapkin (50 km Race Walk), and Olga Kaniskina (20 km Race Walk).

The following athletes appeared on the preliminary Entry List, but not on the Official Start List of the specific event, resulting in a total number of 76 competitors:

KEY:	Did not participate	Competed in another event

	Event	Athlete
Men	4 x 400 metres relay	Yuriy Trambovetsky
Men	High jump	Yaroslav Rybakov
Women	Marathon	Elza Kireeva
Women	Marathon	Tatyana Pushkareva
Women	4 x 100 metres relay	Yuliya Katsura
Women	4 x 400 metres relay	Tatyana Firova
Women	Triple jump	Alsu Murtazina

== Medalists ==
The following competitors from Russia won medals at the Championships

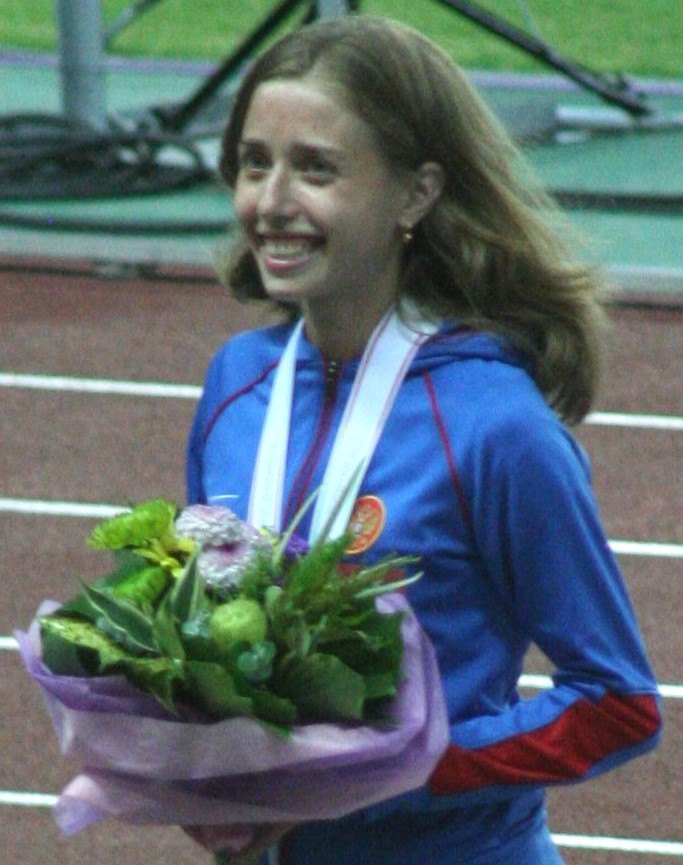
Olga Kaniskina defended her title in the 20km Race Walk event for the second time achieving a hat trick (foto archived from 2007)

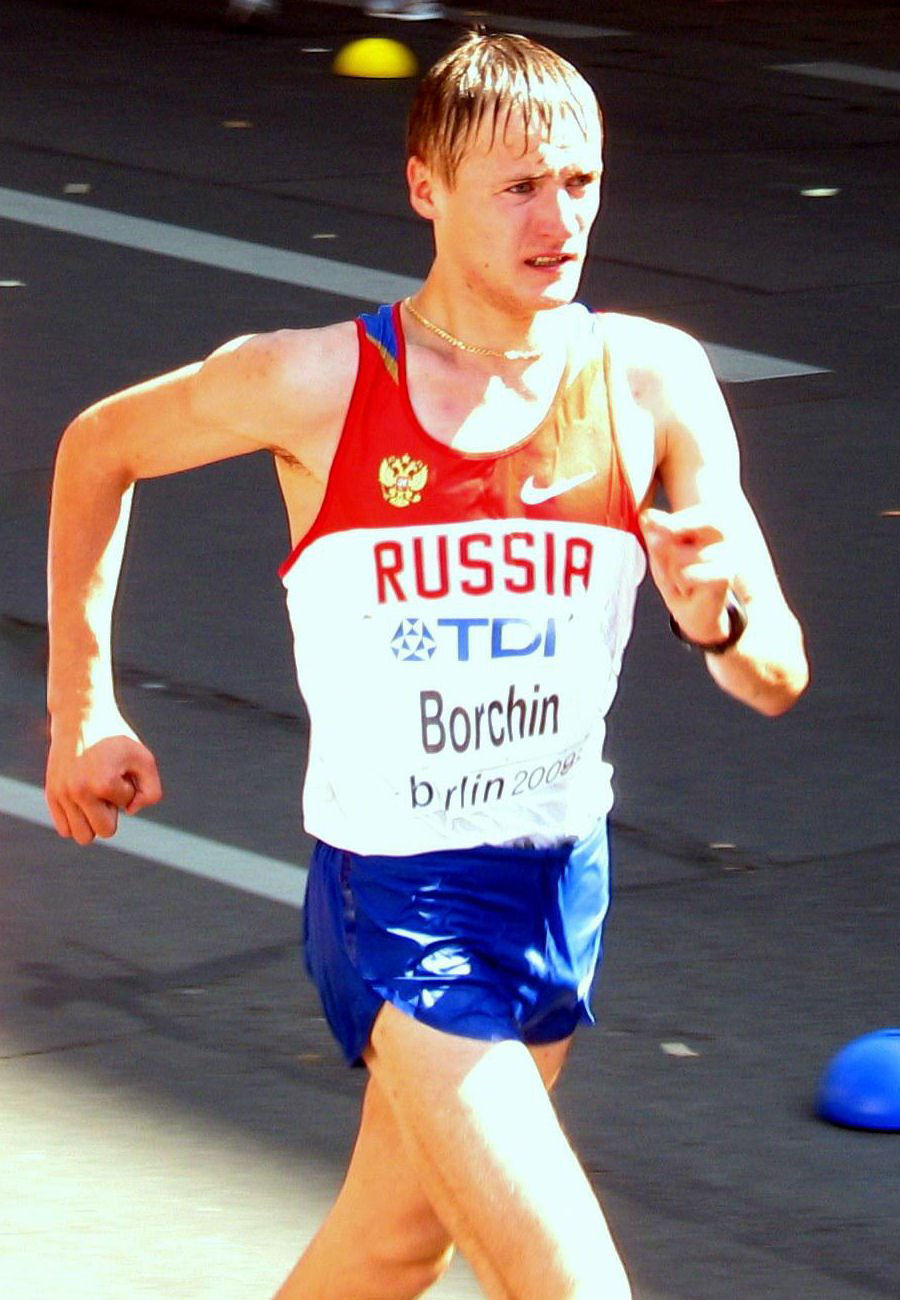
Valeriy Borchin defended his title in the 20 km Race Walk event (foto archived from 2009)

Medal	Athlete	Event
Gold	Sergey Bakulin	50 kilometres walk
Gold	Anna Chicherova	High jump
Gold	Tatyana Lysenko	Hammer throw
Silver	Aleksey Dmitrik	High jump
Bronze	Yuriy Borzakovskiy	800 metres
Bronze	Natalya Antyukh	400 m hurdles
Bronze	Svetlana Feofanova	Pole vault

== Results ==
=== Men ===
Athlete	Event	Preliminaries		Heats		Semifinals		Final	
Athlete	Event	Time Width Height	Rank	Time Width Height	Rank	Time Width Height	Rank	Time Width Height	Rank
Pavel Trenikhin	400 metres			45.55 PB	23 q	45.68	12	Did not advance	
Yuriy Borzakovskiy	800 metres			1:46.14	6 Q	1:45.73	10 Q	1:44.49	3rd place, bronze medalist(s)
Aleksey Sokolov (born 1979)	Marathon							2:16:23	19
Aleksey Sokolov (born 1983)	Marathon							2:16:48	21
Sergey Shubenkov	110 m hurdles			13.70	25	Did not advance			
Aleksandr Derevyagin	400 m hurdles			49.43 SB	13 Q	49.07 SB	8 q	49.32	8
Andrey Farnosov	3000 metres steeplechase			8:34.44	23			Did not advance	
Maksim Dyldin; Konstantin Svechkar; Pavel Trenikhin; Denis Alekseyev	4 x 400 metres relay			3:00.81 SB	7 Q			3:00.22 SB	4
Valeriy Borchin	20 kilometres walk							1:19:56	1st place, gold medalist(s)
Vladimir Kanaykin	20 kilometres walk							1:20:27	2nd place, silver medalist(s)
Stanislav Yemelyanov	20 kilometres walk							1:21:11	5
Sergey Morozov	20 kilometres walk							1:22:37	12
Sergey Bakulin	50 kilometres walk							3:41:24	1st place, gold medalist(s)
Denis Nizhegorodov	50 kilometres walk							3:42:45 SB	2nd place, silver medalist(s)
Sergey Kirdyapkin	50 kilometres walk								DNF
Igor Yerokhin	50 kilometres walk								DQ
Aleksandr Menkov	Long jump	8.07	8 q					8.19	6
Aleksey Fyodorov	Triple jump	16.42	18					Did not advance	
Aleksey Dmitrik	High jump	2.28	11 q					2.35	2nd place, silver medalist(s)
Ivan Ukhov	High jump	2.31	4 Q					2.32	5
Aleksandr Shustov	High jump	2.31	6 Q					2.29	8
Dmitriy Starodubtsev	Pole vault	5.65	1 q					5.65	12
Yevgeniy Lukyanenko	Pole vault	5.50	18					Did not advance	
Maksim Sidorov	Shot put	19.95	15					Did not advance	
Kirill Ikonnikov	Hammer throw	75.36	12 q					78.37	6
Sergey Litvinov	Hammer throw	74.80	15					Did not advance	
Dmitriy Tarabin	Javelin throw	82.92	2 Q					79.06	10
Sergey Makarov	Javelin throw	81.42	10 q					78.76	12
Aleksandr Ivanov	Javelin throw	73.81	28					Did not advance	

Decathlon

Aleksey Drozdov	Decathlon			
Aleksey Drozdov	Event	Results	Points	Rank
	100 m	11.34	786	29
	Long jump	7.45	922	16
	Shot put	16.17	862	4
	High jump	2.14	934	1
	400 m	51.35	753	6
	110 m hurdles	15.49	791	11
	Discus throw	50.29	876	5
	Pole vault	5.00	910	4
	Javelin throw	64.80	810	4
	1500 m	4:41.73	669	4
Total			8313	4

=== Women ===
Athlete	Event	Preliminaries		Heats		Semifinals		Final	
Athlete	Event	Time Width Height	Rank	Time Width Height	Rank	Time Width Height	Rank	Time Width Height	Rank
Aleksandra Fedoriva	100 metres			11.28 PB	18 Q	11.54	18	Did not advance	
Yelizaveta Savlinis	200 metres			23.09	17 Q	23.04	14	Did not advance	
Yuliya Gushchina	200 metres			22.88 SB	11 Q	23.26	18	Did not advance	
Anastasiya Kapachinskaya	400 metres			51.43	6 Q	50.41	4 Q	50.24	3rd place, bronze medalist(s)
Antonina Krivoshapka	400 metres			51.52	8 Q	50.55	7 q	50.66	5
Mariya Savinova	800 metres			2:01.01	5 Q	1:58.45	2 Q	1:55.87 WL	1st place, gold medalist(s)
Yekaterina Kostetskaya	800 metres			1:59.61	2 Q	1:58.64	4 Q	1:57.82	5
Yuliya Rusanova	800 metres			2:01.38	14 q	1:58.73	6 Q	1:59.74	8
Yekaterina Martynova	1500 metres			4:07.76	5 Q	4:08.67	10	Did not advance	
Olesya Syreva	1500 metres			4:11.24	18 q	4:09.83	18	Did not advance	
Natalya Yevdokimova	1500 metres			4:14.36	26 Q	4:11.70	23	Did not advance	
Yelena Zadorozhnaya	5000 metres			15:23.90	5 Q			15:15.48	10
Yelizaveta Grechishnikova	5000 metres			15:35.64	14 q			15:45.61	14
Margarita Plaksina	Marathon							2:35:39	23
Tatyana Dektyareva	100 m hurdles			13.05	16 Q	12.76 SB	6 q	12.82	5
Natalya Antyukh	400 m hurdles			54.88	2 Q	54.51	2	53.85	3rd place, bronze medalist(s)
Yelena Churakova	400 m hurdles			55.39	9 Q	55.02	6	55.17	8
Yuliya Zaripova	3000 metres steeplechase			9:35.80	8 Q			9:07.03 WL	1st place, gold medalist(s)
Lyubov Kharlamova	3000 metres steeplechase			9:40.04	15 q			9:44.14	11
Yuliya Gushchina; Natalya Rusakova; Yelizaveta Savlinis; Aleksandra Fedoriva	4 x 100 metres relay			42.78 SB	7 q			42.93	6
Anastasiya Kapachinskaya; Antonina Krivoshapka; Kseniya Vdovina; Kseniya Zadorina; Lyudmila Litvinova; Natalya Antyukh	4 x 400 metres relay			3:20.94 WL	1 Q			3:19.36 SB	3rd place, bronze medalist(s)
Olga Kaniskina	20 kilometres walk							1:29:42	1st place, gold medalist(s)
Anisya Kirdyapkina	20 kilometres walk							1:30:13	3rd place, bronze medalist(s)
Vera Sokolova	20 kilometres walk							1:32:13	11
Tatyana Mineyeva	20 kilometres walk							1:34:08	17
Olga Kucherenko	Long jump	6.67	7 q					6.77	2nd place, silver medalist(s)
Darya Klishina	Long jump	6.77	4 Q					6.50	7
Olga Zaytseva	Long jump	6.50	13					Did not advance	
Anna Kuropatkina	Triple jump	14.31	7 q					14.23	7
Anna Chicherova	High jump	1.95	1 Q					2.03	1st place, gold medalist(s)
Yelena Slesarenko	High jump	1.95	9 Q					1.97 SB	4
Svetlana Shkolina	High jump	1.95	5 Q					1.97	5
Svetlana Feofanova	Pole vault	4.55	7 q					4.75 SB	3rd place, bronze medalist(s)
Yelena Isinbayeva	Pole vault	4.55	1 q					4.65	6
Yevgeniya Kolodko	Shot put	18.90	9 Q					19.78 PB	5
Anna Avdeyeva	Shot put	18.92	8 Q					19.54 SB	7
Anna Omarova	Shot put	19.03	6 Q					18.67	10
Darya Pishchalnikova	Discus throw	59.94	12 q					58.10	11
Tatyana Lysenko	Hammer throw	71.94	4 Q					77.13 SB	1st place, gold medalist(s)
Mariya Abakumova	Javelin throw	62.49	5 Q					71.99 CR	1st place, gold medalist(s)

Heptathlon

Tatyana Chernova	Heptathlon			
Tatyana Chernova	Event	Results	Points	Rank
	100 m hurdles	13.32 PB	1077	6
	High jump	1.83 SB	1016	8
	Shot put	14.17 SB	805	13
	200 m	23.50 PB	1029	2
	Long jump	6.61	1043	1
	Javelin throw	52.95 SB	917	3
	800 m	2:08.04 SB	993	3
Total			6880 WL	1st place, gold medalist(s)

Anna Bogdanova	Heptathlon			
Anna Bogdanova	Event	Results	Points	Rank
	100 m hurdles	13.44 SB	1059	11
	High jump	1.83	1016	5
	Shot put	14.52 SB	829	9
	200 m	25.64	829	22
	Long jump	6.38	969	6
	Javelin throw	41.38 PB	694	18
	800 m	2:18.34	846	21
Total			6242 SB	11
