= Germany at the 2011 World Championships in Athletics =

- WA code: GER
- National federation: Deutscher Leichtathletik-Verband
- Website: www.leichtathletik.de

in Daegu
- Competitors: 65
- Medals: Gold 3 Silver 3 Bronze 1 Total 7

World Championships in Athletics appearances (overview)
- 1991; 1993; 1995; 1997; 1999; 2001; 2003; 2005; 2007; 2009; 2011; 2013; 2015; 2017; 2019; 2022; 2023; 2025

Germany competed at the 2011 World Championships in Athletics from August 27 to September 4 in Daegu, South Korea.

== Team selection ==
The German Athletics Association (Deutscher Leichtathletik-Verband) has announced a preliminary squad of 64 to participate at the competition. Among the team of 33 men and 31 women are defending world champion Robert Harting and current hammer throw world record holder Betty Heidler. The final team comprises 78 athletes.

The following athletes appeared on the preliminary Entry List, but not on the Official Start List of the specific event, resulting in total number of 65 competitors:

KEY:	Did not participate	Competed in another event

	Event	Athlete
Men	1500 metres	Carsten Schlangen
Men	4 × 100 metres relay	Christian Blum
Men	4 × 100 metres relay	Robin Erewa
Men	4 × 100 metres relay	Sven Knipphals
Men	4 × 400 metres relay	David Gollnow
Men	50 kilometres walk	André Höhne
Men	50 kilometres walk	Christopher Linke
Men	Pole vault	Björn Otto
Men	Javelin throw	Till Wöschler
Women	4 × 100 metres relay	Leena Günther
Women	4 × 100 metres relay	Anne Christina Haack
Women	4 × 400 metres relay	Sylvia Semkowicz
Women	4 × 400 metres relay	Wiebke Ullmann
Women	Triple jump	Katja Demut
Women	Pole vault	Carolin Hingst

== Medalists ==
The following competitors from Germany won medals at the Championships

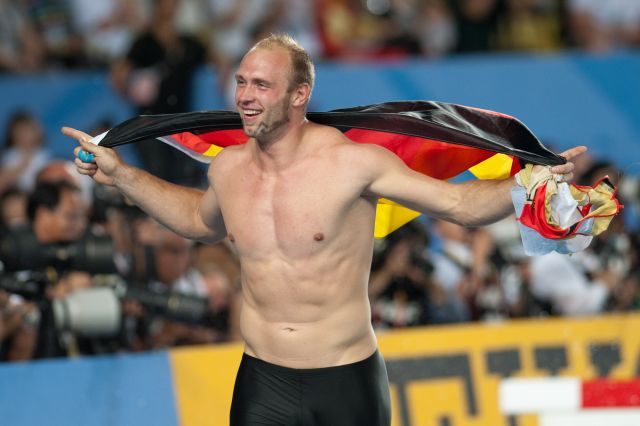
Robert Harting won the gold medal in the Men's Discus Throw event at this year's championships

Medal	Athlete	Event
Gold	David Storl	Shot put
Gold	Robert Harting	Discus throw
Gold	Matthias de Zordo	Javelin throw
Silver	Martina Strutz	Pole vault
Silver	Nadine Müller	Discus throw
Silver	Betty Heidler	Hammer throw
Bronze	Jennifer Oeser	Heptathlon

== Results ==
=== Men ===
Athlete	Event	Preliminaries		Heats		Semifinals		Final	
Athlete	Event	Time Width Height	Rank	Time Width Height	Rank	Time Width Height	Rank	Time Width Height	Rank
Sebastian Ernst	200 metres			20.95	33	Did not advance			
Erik Balnuweit	110 metres hurdles			13.57	17	Did not advance			
Alexander John	110 metres hurdles			13.68	24	Did not advance			
Willi Mathiszik	110 metres hurdles			13.53	12 Q	13.81	16	Did not advance	
Georg Fleischhauer	400 m hurdles			48.72	5 Q	49.36	13	Did not advance	
Steffen Uliczka	3000 metres steeplechase			8:37.35	27			Did not advance	
Tobias Unger; Marius Broening; Sebastian Ernst; Alex Schaf	4 × 100 metres relay			DNF				Did not advance	
Jonas Plass; Kamghe Gaba; Miguel Rigau; Thomas Schneider; Eric Krüger	4 × 400 metres relay			3:00.68	5 q			3:01.37	8
Christopher Linke	20 kilometres walk							1:24:17	21
Sebastian Bayer	Long jump	8.11	5 q					8.17	8
Christian Reif	Long jump	8.13	3 q					8.19	7
Eike Onnen	High jump	2.28	15					Did not advance	
Raul Spank	High jump	2.28	11 q					2.29	9
Karsten Dilla	Pole vault	5.40	24					Did not advance	
Raphael Holzdeppe	Pole vault	5.50	20					Did not advance	
Malte Mohr	Pole vault	5.65	6 q					5.85	5
Ralf Bartels	Shot put	20.45	8 q					20.14	10
Marco Schmidt	Shot put	20.06	13					Did not advance	
David Storl	Shot put	21.50	1 Q					21.78	Gold medal
Robert Harting	Discus throw	64.93	5 q					68.97	Gold medal
Markus Münch	Discus throw	60.80	26					Did not advance	
Martin Wierig	Discus throw	61.68	19					Did not advance	
Markus Esser	Hammer throw	77.60	3 Q					79.12	4
Matthias de Zordo	Javelin throw	82.05	4 q					86.27	Gold medal
Mark Frank	Javelin throw	81.93	6 q					81.81	8

Decathlon

Pascal Behrenbruch	Decathlon			
Pascal Behrenbruch	Event	Results	Points	Rank
	100 m	11.08	843	18
	Long jump	6.80	767	25
	Shot put	16.01	852	4
	High jump	1.93	740	24
	400 m	49.90	819	16
	110 m hurdles	14.33	932	7
	Discus throw	48.56	840	4
	Pole vault	4.90	880	8
	Javelin throw	66.50	836	6
	1500 m	4:36.64	702	10
Total			8211	7

Rico Freimuth	Decathlon			
Rico Freimuth	Event	Results	Points	Rank
	100 m	10.83	899	9
	Long jump	NM	0	
	Shot put	NM	0	
	High jump	DNS		
	400 m			
	110 m hurdles			
	Discus throw			
	Pole vault			
	Javelin throw			
	1500 m			
Total			DNF	

Jan-Felix Knobel	Decathlon			
Jan-Felix Knobel	Event	Results	Points	Rank
	100 m	11.18	821	21
	Long jump	7.30	886	13
	Shot put	16.06	855	3
	High jump	1.96	767	18
	400 m	49.46	840	11
	110 m hurdles	14.92	859	22
	Discus throw	47.93	827	5
	Pole vault	4.70	819	15
	Javelin throw	68.42	865	3
	1500 m	4:43.12	661	12
Total			8200	8

=== Women ===
Athlete	Event	Preliminaries		Heats		Semifinals		Final	
Athlete	Event	Time Width Height	Rank	Time Width Height	Rank	Time Width Height	Rank	Time Width Height	Rank
Yasmin Kwadwo	100 metres	bye		11.29	19 q	11.54	18	Did not advance	
Leena Günther	100 metres	bye		11.36	26	Did not advance			
Cindy Roleder	100 m hurdles			13.01	14 q	12.91	12	Did not advance	
Gesa Felicitas Krause	3000 metres steeplechase			9:35.83	9 Q			9:32.74	9
Jana Sussmann	3000 metres steeplechase			9:59.93	23			Did not advance	
Yasmin Kwadwo; Anne Möllinger; Cathleen Tschirch; Marion Wagner	4 × 100 metres relay			DNF				Did not advance	
Janin Lindenberg; Esther Cremer; Lena Schmidt; Claudia Hoffmann	4 × 400 metres relay			3:27.31	11			Did not advance	
Sabine Krantz	20 kilometres walk							DNF	
Melanie Seeger	20 kilometres walk							DNF	
Bianca Kappler	Long jump	6.48	14					Did not advance	
Sosthene Taroum Moguenara	Long jump	6.02	31					Did not advance	
Kristina Gadschiew	Pole vault	4.50	11 q					4.55	10
Silke Spiegelburg	Pole vault	4.55	7 q					4.65	9
Martina Strutz	Pole vault	4.55	1 q					4.80	Silver medal
Nadine Kleinert	Shot put	18.75	12 Q					19.26	8
Christina Schwanitz	Shot put	19.20	3 Q					17.96	12
Josephine Terlecki	Shot put	17.85	19					Did not advance	
Nadine Müller	Discus throw	65.54	1 Q					65.97	Silver medal
Betty Heidler	Hammer throw	71.48	6 Q					76.06	Silver medal
Kathrin Klaas	Hammer throw	71.69	5 Q					71.89	7
Katharina Molitor	Javelin throw	63.52	3 Q					64.32	5
Christina Obergföll	Javelin throw	68.76	1 Q					65.24	4
Linda Stahl	Javelin throw	60.21	9 q					DNS	

Heptathlon

Julia Mächtig	Heptathlon			
Julia Mächtig	Event	Results	Points	Rank
	100 m hurdles	14.15	957	27
	High jump	1.80	978	16
	Shot put	15.24	877	3
	200 m	25.54	838	19
	Long jump	5.98	843	20
	Javelin throw	43.74	739	12
	800 m	2:17.14	863	21
Total			6085	17

Jennifer Oeser	Heptathlon			
Jennifer Oeser	Event	Results	Points	Rank
	100 m hurdles	13.33	1075	7
	High jump	1.83	1016	9
	Shot put	13.70	774	15
	200 m	24.58	926	11
	Long jump	6.28	937	8
	Javelin throw	51.30	885	4
	800 m	2:10.39	959	5
Total			6572	Bronze medal

Lilli Schwarzkopf	Heptathlon			
Lilli Schwarzkopf	Event	Results	Points	Rank
	100 m hurdles	13.65	1028	19
	High jump	1.80	978	10
	Shot put	14.89	854	5
	200 m	25.82	813	24
	Long jump	6.18	905	12
	Javelin throw	49.69	854	5
	800 m	2:15.26	889	13
Total			6321	6
