= Czech Republic at the 2011 World Championships in Athletics =

- WA code: CZE
- National federation: Český atletický svaz
- Website: www.atletika.cz

in Daegu
- Competitors: 21
- Medals: Gold 0 Silver 1 Bronze 0 Total 1

World Championships in Athletics appearances
- 1993; 1995; 1997; 1999; 2001; 2003; 2005; 2007; 2009; 2011; 2013; 2015; 2017; 2019; 2022; 2023

The Czech Republic competed at the 2011 World Championships in Athletics from August 27 to September 4 in Daegu, South Korea.

== Team selection ==
The Czech athletic federation will send a 21-member strong team (13 women and 8 men) into the event including world season leaders Barbora Špotáková (Javelin Throw) and Zuzana Hejnová (400m Hurdles) and European indoor medallists from Paris Denisa Rosolová (400m), Jaroslav Bába (High Jump) and Roman Šebrle (Decathlon).

The following athletes appeared on the preliminary Entry List, but not on the Official Start List of the specific event:

KEY:	Did not participate	Competed in another event

	Event	Athlete
Women	200 metres	Denisa Rosolová
Women	4 x 400 metres relay	Kateřina Cachová

== Medalists ==
The following competitor from the Czech Republic won a medal at the Championships

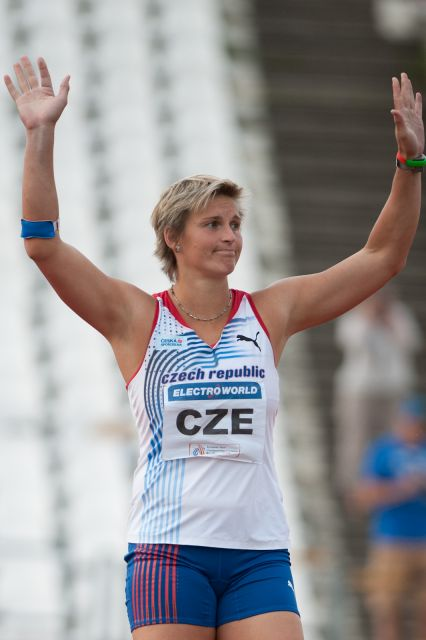
Barbora Špotáková won a silver medal in the Women's Javelin Throw event at this year's championships (foto archived from 2010)

Medal	Athlete	Event
Silver	Barbora Špotáková	Javelin throw

== Results ==
=== Men ===
Athlete	Event	Preliminaries		Heats		Semifinals		Final	
Athlete	Event	Time Width Height	Rank	Time Width Height	Rank	Time Width Height	Rank	Time Width Height	Rank
Pavel Maslák	200 metres			20.63 PB	11 Q	20.87	14	Did not advance	
Jaroslav Bába	High jump	2.31	8 Q					2.32	4
Jan Kudlička	Pole vault	5.50 m	12 q					5.65 SB	9
Jan Marcell	Shot put	19.51	20					Did not advance	
Jan Marcell	Discus throw	62.29	13					Did not advance	
Vítězslav Veselý	Javelin throw	81.64	8 q					84.11 SB	4
Jakub Vadlejch	Javelin throw	80.08	16					Did not advance	
Petr Frydrych	Javelin throw	76.18	24					Did not advance	

Decathlon

Roman Šebrle	Decathlon			
Roman Šebrle	Event	Results	Points	Rank
	100 m	11.25	806	26
	Long jump	7.30	886	14
	Shot put	15.20	802	7
	High jump	2.05	850	4
	400 m	51.18 SB	761	24
	110 m hurdles	14.75 SB	880	18
	Discus throw	46.93	807	8
	Pole vault	4.80	849	13
	Javelin throw	67.28	848	5
	1500 m	4:29.19	750	7
Total			8069	13

=== Women ===
Athlete	Event	Preliminaries		Heats		Semifinals		Final	
Athlete	Event	Time Width Height	Rank	Time Width Height	Rank	Time Width Height	Rank	Time Width Height	Rank
Denisa Rosolová	400 metres			52.51	19 Q	52.53	20	Did not advance	
Lucie Škrobáková	100 m hurdles			12.89 SB	7 Q	12.98	16	Did not advance	
Zuzana Hejnová	400 m hurdles			55.12	7 Q	54.76	4 Q	54.23	7
Marcela Lustigová	3000 metres steeplechase			10:12.54	30			Did not advance	
Denisa Rosolová; Zuzana Bergrová; Jitka Bartoničková; Zuzana Hejnová	4 x 400 metres relay			3:26.01 SB	8 q			3:26.57	7
Lucie Pelantová	20 kilometres walk							1:35:45	25
Zuzana Schindlerová	20 kilometres walk							1:39:57	34
Jiřina Ptáčníková	Pole vault	4.55 m	5 q					4.65 SB	7
Věra Pospíšilová-Cechlová	Discus throw	53.87	23					Did not advance	
Barbora Špotáková	Javelin throw	63.40	4 Q					71.58	2nd place, silver medalist(s)
Jarmila Klimešová	Javelin throw	59.65	12 q					59.27	8

Heptathlon

Kateřina Cachová	Heptathlon			
Kateřina Cachová	Event	Results	Points	Rank
	100 m hurdles	13.81 SB	1005	22
	High jump	1.77	941	18
	Shot put	11.64	637	26
	200 m	25.36	854	19
	Long jump	5.97	840	22
	Javelin throw	43.98	744	11
	800 m	2:15.43	887	15
Total			5908	21
