= Netherlands at the 2011 World Championships in Athletics =

- WA code: NED
- National federation: Atletiekunie
- Website: www.atletiekunie.nl

in Daegu
- Competitors: 17
- Medals: Gold 0 Silver 0 Bronze 0 Total 0

World Championships in Athletics appearances
- 1976; 1980; 1983; 1987; 1991; 1993; 1995; 1997; 1999; 2001; 2003; 2005; 2007; 2009; 2011; 2013; 2015; 2017; 2019; 2022; 2023; 2025

The Netherlands competed at the 2011 World Championships in Athletics from August 27 to September 4 in Daegu, South Korea. Although the team won no medals at the championships, there were notable performances from future double world champion, Dafne Schippers, who set a new national record in the heats of the women's 200 metres and the women's 4 × 100 metres relay team, who also set a new national record in the heats to set the ninth fastest time and miss out on qualification for the final by just one place.

== Team selection ==
A team of 20 athletes was announced to represent the country in the event. The team was led by top sprinter Churandy Martina, fourth in the 2008 Olympic Games 100m, who had to find a new home because of the dissolution of the Netherlands Antilles, and the refusal by the IOC to allow membership of Curaçao due to 1995 decision that membership is only open to sovereign countries (see here).

The following athletes appeared on the preliminary Entry List, but not on the Official Start List of the specific event, resulting in a total number of 17 competitors:

KEY:	Did not participate	Competed in another event

	Event	Athlete
Men	4 × 100 metres relay	Mike van Kruchten
Men	4 × 100 metres relay	Churandy Martina
Women	4 × 100 metres relay	Marit Dopheide
Women	4 × 100 metres relay	Nikki van Leeuwen

== Results ==
=== Men ===
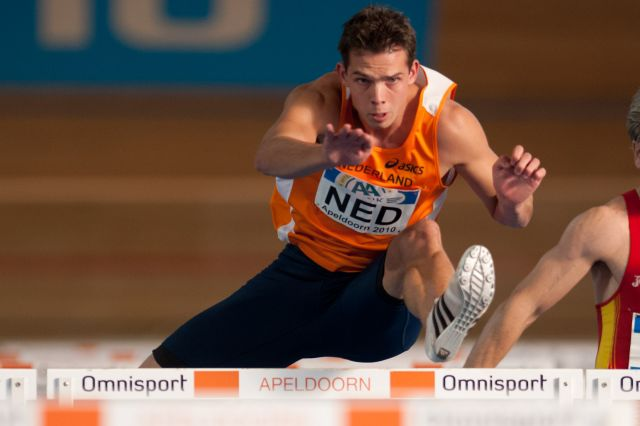
Eelco Sintnicolaas was the most successful Dutch athlete in Daegu with a fifth-place finish in the decathlon

Athlete	Event	Preliminaries		Heats		Semifinals		Final	
Athlete	Event	Time Width Height	Rank	Time Width Height	Rank	Time Width Height	Rank	Time Width Height	Rank
Churandy Martina	100 metres			10.32	13 Q	10.29	18	Did not advance	
Churandy Martina	200 metres			20.70	17	DNS		Did not advance	
Bram Som	800 metres			1:46.79	19	1:46.69	17	Did not advance	
Giovanni Codrington; Brian Mariano; Jerrel Feller; Patrick van Luijk	4 × 100 metres relay			DSQ				Did not advance	
Rutger Smith	Discus throw	62.12	16					Did not advance	
Erik Cadée	Discus throw	61.62	20					Did not advance	

Decathlon

Eelco Sintnicolaas	Decathlon			
Eelco Sintnicolaas	Event	Results	Points	Rank
	100 m	10.76 SB	915	6
	Long jump	7.29	883	15
	Shot put	14.13	736	19
	High jump	1.93	740	23
	400 m	48.35 SB	892	4
	110 m hurdles	14.42	921	9
	Discus throw	42.23 SB	710	20
	Pole vault	5.20	972	1
	Javelin throw	61.07 SB	754	10
	1500 m	4:25.40	775	5
Total			8298	5

Ingmar Vos	Decathlon			
Ingmar Vos	Event	Results	Points	Rank
	100 m	10.82 SB	901	8
	Long jump	7.41	913	8
	Shot put	13.86	720	20
	High jump	DNS		
	400 m	DNS		
	110 m hurdles			
	Discus throw			
	Pole vault			
	Javelin throw			
	1500 m			
Total			DNF	

=== Women ===
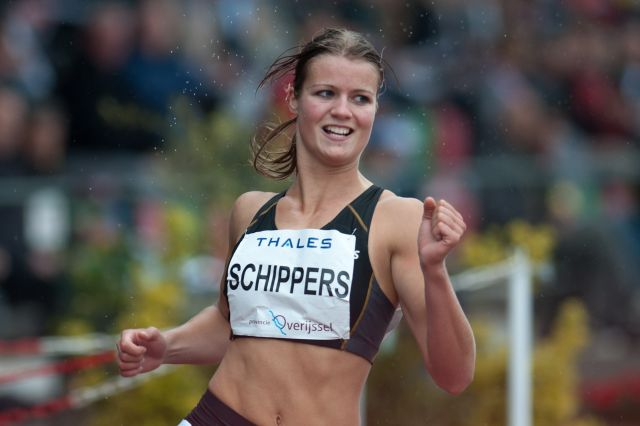
19-year-old Dafne Schippers set a national record in the 200 metres

Athlete	Event	Preliminaries		Heats		Semifinals		Final	
Athlete	Event	Time Width Height	Rank	Time Width Height	Rank	Time Width Height	Rank	Time Width Height	Rank
Dafne Schippers	200 metres			22.69 NR	4	22.92	9	Did not advance	
Yvonne Hak	800 metres			2:03.05	27	Did not advance			
Kadene Vassell; Dafne Schippers; Anouk Hagen; Jamile Samuel	4 × 100 metres relay			43.44 NR	9			Did not advance	
Monique Jansen	Discus throw	58.23	17					Did not advance	

Heptathlon

Remona Fransen	Heptathlon			
Remona Fransen	Event	Results	Points	Rank
	100 m hurdles	13.57 PB	1040	16
	High jump	1.80	978	10
	Shot put	13.67	772	16
	200 m	25.17	871	14
	Long jump	6.06	868	16
	Javelin throw	38.03	630	24
	800 m	2:16.80	868	18
Total			6027	19
