= 2011 World Championships in Athletics – Women's discus throw =

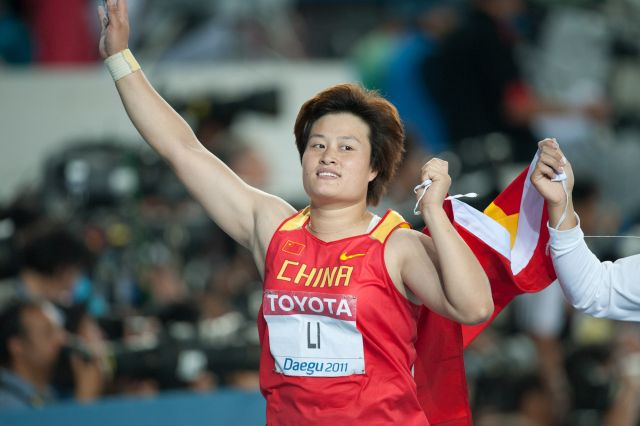
Li Yanfeng celebrating in Daegu

Official Video

The women's discus throw event at the 2011 World Championships in Athletics was held at the Daegu Stadium on August 27 and 28.

Dani Samuels was the defending champion, but had not performed well prior to the event. Germany's Nadine Müller was the leader in the Diamond League, but it was Chinese thrower Li Yanfeng who held the best mark that season (67.98 m). Stephanie Brown Trafton entered as the reigning Olympic champion, while 2009 World medallists Yarelis Barrios and Nicoleta Grasu were other prominent competitors. Sandra Perković, the leading athlete earlier in the season, was absent due to a six-month ban for doping offences.

Nadine Müller had the best mark in the qualifying rounds, with her sole throw of 65.54 m to make the final. Li Yanfeng and Yarelys Barrios were the next best throwers in the first round. Dani Samuels narrowly avoided elimination, while Aretha Thurmond was among those to miss the final. In the final the following day, Li took the lead in the first round with a throw of 65.28 m and Müller followed her over the 65 m line into second place. Żaneta Glanc of Poland had an opening throw of 63.91 m, moving into third place. The top three remained unchanged after the second throw, although Li improved her lead to 66.52 m and Müller consolidated her second place with a mark of 65.97 m. Barrios of Cuba moved into third in the next round with her best mark of the competition (65.73 m) and defending champion Samuels was struck out in the final cut off. Brown Trafton threw her best (63.85 m) in round four, moving into fifth place, but the medal positions remained unchanged thereafter – Li won the gold medal, while Müller and Barrios took the silver and bronze medals, respectively.

Although Li had won gold medals in Asian-level competitions, it was the 32-year-old's first medal of any colour on the world stage. She credited her success to her work with German coach Karl-Heinz Steinmetz and increased seasonal competition against foreign athletes. Müller silver also represented her first medal at a global championships. For Barrios it was her fourth consecutive time on the major podium, having been runner-up at the two previous world championships and winner of the 2008 Olympic silver medal.

== Medalists ==
Gold	Silver	Bronze
Li Yanfeng; China	Nadine Müller; Germany	Yarelys Barrios; Cuba

== Records ==
Prior to the competition, the established records were as follows.

World record	Gabriele Reinsch (GDR)	76.80	Neubrandenburg, East Germany	7 July 1988
Championship record	Martina Hellmann (GDR)	71.62	Rome, Italy	31 August 1987
World leading	Li Yanfeng (CHN)	67.98	Schönebeck, Germany	5 June 2011
African record	Elizna Naudé (RSA)	64.87	Stellenbosch, South Africa	2 March 2003
Asian record	Xiao Yanling (CHN)	71.68	Beijing, China	14 March 1992
North, Central American and Caribbean record	Hilda Ramos (CUB)	70.88	Havana, Cuba	8 May 1992
South American record	Elisângela Adriano (BRA)	62.00	São Caetano do Sul, Brazil	23 July 2011
European record	Gabriele Reinsch (GDR)	76.80	Neubrandenburg, East Germany	7 July 1988
Oceanian record	Daniela Costian (AUS)	68.72	Auckland, New Zealand	22 January 1994

== Qualification standards ==
A standard	B standard
62.00 m	59.50 m

== Schedule ==
Date	Time	Round
August 27, 2011	10:05	Qualification
August 28, 2011	19:05	Final

== Results ==
=== Qualification ===
Qualification: Qualifying Performance 62.00 (Q) or at least 12 best performers (q) advance to the final.

Rank	Group	Athlete	Nationality	#1	#2	#3	Result	Notes
1	A	Nadine Müller	Germany	65.54			65.54	Q
2	B	Li Yanfeng	China	x	64.44		64.44	Q
3	A	Yarelis Barrios	Cuba	63.80			63.80	Q
4	B	Żaneta Glanc	Poland	59.48	63.44		63.44	Q
5	A	Tan Jian	China	62.26			62.26	Q
6	B	Stephanie Brown Trafton	United States	61.89	x	59.87	61.89	q
7	A	Zinaida Sendriūtė	Lithuania	x	56.61	61.72	61.72	q
8	A	Dragana Tomašević	Serbia	60.45	x	x	60.45	q
9	B	Denia Caballero	Cuba	x	52.93	60.36	60.36	q
10	B	Nicoleta Grasu	Romania	60.13	58.25	59.58	60.13	q
11	A	Dani Samuels	Australia	59.77	60.05	59.98	60.05	q
12	A	Darya Pishchalnikova	Russia	54.11	59.94	59.53	59.94	q
13	B	Aretha Thurmond	United States	59.88	x	59.48	59.88	
14	A	Ma Xuejun	China	55.80	59.34	59.71	59.71	
15	A	Gia Lewis-Smallwood	United States	x	56.91	59.49	59.49	
16	A	Natalya Fokina-Semenova	Ukraine	56.73	55.16	58.27	58.27	
17	B	Monique Jansen	Netherlands	58.23	58.06	57.96	58.23	
18	A	Andressa de Morais	Brazil	x	44.41	57.93	57.93	
19	B	Kazai Suzanne Kragbé	Ivory Coast	57.55	55.75	x	57.55	
20	B	Kateryna Karsak	Ukraine	57.54	x	57.29	57.54	
21	B	Harwant Kaur	India	55.50	56.49	52.98	56.49	
22	B	Elisângela Adriano	Brazil	56.28	53.70	56.45	56.45	
23	A	Věra Pospíšilová-Cechlová	Czech Republic	53.87	51.52	x	53.87	
24	B	Karen Gallardo	Chile	51.32	52.33	53.69	53.69	

=== Final ===
Format: Each athlete has three attempts, then the eight best performers have three further attempts

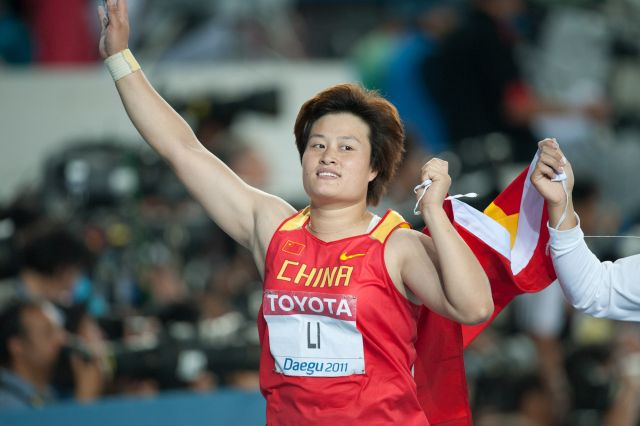
Li Yanfeng celebrating her victory in Daegu

Rank	Athlete	Nationality	#1	#2	#3	#4	#5	#6	Result	Notes
1st place, gold medalist(s)	Li Yanfeng	China	65.28	66.52	65.50	64.32	64.34	63.83	66.52	
2nd place, silver medalist(s)	Nadine Müller	Germany	65.06	65.97	64.08	62.55	x	x	65.97	
3rd place, bronze medalist(s)	Yarelys Barrios	Cuba	x	61.87	65.73	63.93	x	63.90	65.73	SB
4	Żaneta Glanc	Poland	63.91	62.30	63.11	62.69	62.17	60.32	63.91	
5	Stephanie Brown Trafton	United States	60.20	60.97	60.24	63.85	60.26	x	63.85	
6	Tan Jian	China	60.46	61.44	61.79	62.96	x	61.12	62.96	
7	Dragana Tomašević	Serbia	62.26	58.97	62.48	x	59.03	58.63	62.48	SB
8	Nicoleta Grasu	Romania	57.95	60.34	62.08	60.79	60.45	60.72	62.08	
9	Denia Caballero	Cuba	60.73	60.46	x				60.73	
10	Dani Samuels	Australia	58.08	59.14	x				59.14	
11	Darya Pishchalnikova	Russia	56.89	58.10	57.61				58.10	
12	Zinaida Sendriūtė	Lithuania	x	57.30	53.53				57.30	
