= 2011 World Championships in Athletics – Women's javelin throw =

Official Video

The Women's javelin throw event at the 2011 World Championships in Athletics was held at the Daegu Stadium on September 1 and 2.

Barbora Špotáková, the reigning Olympic champion, topped the season's rankings with a throw of 69.45 m. Second-ranked Christina Obergföll had shown greater consistency, having won four of the Diamond League meetings before the championships. Mariya Abakumova, a 2009 World and 2008 Olympic medallist, was ranked third in both the Diamond League and world rankings. Others in good form were Sunette Viljoen (who set an African record two weeks earlier), Martina Ratej, Kathrina Molitor and Goldie Sayers. The 2009 world champion, Steffi Nerius, had retired.

Favorite Špotáková took the early lead, but Abakumova's second throw would lead into the 5th round. Viljoen improved on her African record in the 5th round, but that was only enough to put her in third place. Špotáková then threw a new World Championship record, only to be passed on the following throw by Abakumova improving on the record and setting a new Russian National Record.

However, in 2018, the Athletics Integrity Unit decided to disqualify Abakumova because of doping, stripping her of the gold medal, which gets inherited by Špotáková.

== Medalists ==
Gold	Silver	Bronze
Barbora Špotáková; Czech Republic	Sunette Viljoen; South Africa	Christina Obergföll; Germany

== Records ==
Prior to the competition, the established records were as follows.

World record	Barbora Špotáková (CZE)	72.28	Stuttgart, Germany	13 September 2008
Championship record	Olisdeilys Menéndez (CUB)	71.70	Helsinki, Finland	14 August 2005
World leading	Barbora Špotáková (CZE)	69.45	Monaco	22 July 2011
African record	Sunette Viljoen (RSA)	66.47	Shenzhen, China	18 August 2011
Asian record	Jianhua Wei (CHN)	63.92	Beijing, China	18 August 2000
North, Central American and Caribbean record	Olisdeilys Menéndez (CUB)	71.70	Helsinki, Finland	14 August 2005
South American record	Sabina Moya (COL)	62.62	Guatemala City, Guatemala	12 May 2002
European record	Barbora Špotáková (CZE)	72.28	Stuttgart, Germany	13 September 2008
Oceanian record	Louise Currey (AUS)	66.80	Runaway Bay, Australia	5 August 2000

== Qualification standards ==
A standard	B standard
61.00	59.00

== Schedule ==
Date	Time	Round
September 1, 2011	10:10	Qualification
September 2, 2011	19:10	Final

== Results ==
=== Qualification ===
Qualification: Qualifying distance 61.00m (Q) or at 12 best athletes and ties (q) advance to the final

Rank	Group	Athlete	Nationality	#1	#2	#3	Result	Notes
1	A	Christina Obergföll	Germany	68.76			68.76	Q
2	B	Sunette Viljoen	South Africa	65.34			65.34	Q
3	A	Katharina Molitor	Germany	63.52			63.52	Q
4	B	Barbora Špotáková	Czech Republic	63.40			63.40	Q
5	A	Goldie Sayers	Great Britain & N.I.	56.61	62.19		62.19	Q
6	B	Martina Ratej	Slovenia	61.58			61.58	Q
7	B	Kimberley Mickle	Australia	60.50	57.80	60.12	60.50	q
8	B	Linda Stahl	Germany	60.21	59.85	58.25	60.21	q
9	A	Yuki Ebihara	Japan	57.36	59.66	59.88	59.88	q
10	A	Madara Palameika	Latvia	59.78	x	59.33	59.78	q
11	A	Jarmila Klimešová	Czech Republic	55.90	59.65	56.01	59.65	q
12	A	Ásdís Hjálmsdóttir	Iceland	59.15	57.62	x	59.15	SB
13	B	Zahra Bani	Italy	x	x	58.92	58.92	
14	A	Rachel Yurkovich	United States	58.84	58.01	57.92	58.84	
15	B	Vira Rebryk	Ukraine	x	55.69	58.50	58.50	
16	B	Mercedes Chilla	Spain	58.34	x	52.01	58.34	
17	B	Sinta Ozoliņa-Kovala	Latvia	56.18	58.15	54.02	58.15	
18	A	Justine Robbeson	South Africa	57.87	55.27	58.08	58.08	
19	B	Liu Chunhua	China	56.73	56.37	57.52	57.52	
20	B	Kara Patterson	United States	56.41	55.25	57.14	57.14	
21	A	Indrė Jakubaitytė	Lithuania	x	56.01	56.92	56.92	
22	A	Yanet Cruz	Cuba	55.91	56.73	55.48	56.73	
23	B	Tatjana Jelača	Serbia	56.68	x	54.58	56.68	
24	A	Elisabeth Eberl	Austria	56.48	54.39	x	56.48	
25	B	Risa Miyashita	Japan	55.62	55.52	55.40	55.62	
26	A	Kim Kyung-ae	South Korea	51.64	53.75	54.96	54.96	
27	B	María Lucelly Murillo	Colombia	x	x	52.83	52.83	
DSQ	A	Mariya Abakumova	Russia	~~x~~	~~62.49~~		~~62.49~~	Q

=== Final ===
Rank	Athlete	Nationality	#1	#2	#3	#4	#5	#6	Result	Notes
1st place, gold medalist(s)	Barbora Špotáková	Czech Republic	68.80	67.90	68.64	67.12	71.58	66.80	71.58	SB
2nd place, silver medalist(s)	Sunette Viljoen	South Africa	64.36	65.20	63.12	58.48	68.38	62.68	68.38	AR
3rd place, bronze medalist(s)	Christina Obergföll	Germany	61.74	64.39	64.80	65.24	63.51	x	65.24	
4	Katharina Molitor	Germany	59.88	58.19	57.94	60.31	58.85	64.32	64.32	
5	Kimberley Mickle	Australia	59.33	57.07	60.87	x	61.96	61.33	61.96	
6	Martina Ratej	Slovenia	58.87	x	60.58	x	61.65	x	61.65	
7	Jarmila Klimešová	Czech Republic	59.27	x	57.37	x	x	55.87	59.27	
8	Yuki Ebihara	Japan	59.08	58.39	57.96				59.08	
9	Goldie Sayers	Great Britain & N.I.	57.32	57.52	58.18				58.18	
10	Madara Palameika	Latvia	55.69	58.08	x				58.08	
	Linda Stahl	Germany							~~DNS~~	
	Mariya Abakumova	Russia	~~60.38~~	~~71.25~~	-	~~x~~	~~71.99~~	~~64.27~~	~~71.99~~	~~NR~~, ~~CR~~, ~~WL~~
