= 2011 World Championships in Athletics – Men's pole vault =

Official Video

The Men's Pole Vault event at the 2011 World Championships in Athletics was held at the Daegu Stadium on August 27 and 29.

Defending champion and Olympic champion Steven Hooker came into the meet injured. He was not able to clear his opening height in the trials.

In the final, with three competitors already over 5.85 (including countryman Łukasz Michalski), Paweł Wojciechowski strategically passed his remaining attempts. At 5.90, he cleared on his second (and last remaining) attempt for the win. Lázaro Borges also cleared 5.90, but on his third attempt, setting the national record for Cuba in the process. Renaud Lavillenie edged Michalski for the bronze, because Michalski had a miss at 5.75.

== Medalists ==
Gold	Silver	Bronze
Paweł Wojciechowski; Poland	Lázaro Borges; Cuba	Renaud Lavillenie; France

== Records ==
World record	Sergey Bubka (UKR)	6.14	Sestriere, Italy	31 July 1994
Championship record	Dmitri Markov (AUS)	6.05	Edmonton, Canada	9 August 2001
World Leading	Paweł Wojciechowski (POL)	5.91	Szczecin, Poland	15 August 2011
African record	Okkert Brits (RSA)	6.03	Cologne, Germany	18 August 1995
Asian record	Grigoriy Yegorov (KAZ)	5.90	Stuttgart, Germany	19 August 1993
North, Central American and Caribbean record	Brad Walker (USA)	6.04	Eugene, United States	8 June 2008
South American record	Fábio Gomes da Silva (BRA)	5.80	São Caetano do Sul, Brazil	26 February 2011
European record	Sergey Bubka (UKR)	6.14	Sestriere, Italy	31 July 1994
Oceanian record	Dmitri Markov (AUS)	6.05	Edmonton, Canada	9 August 2001

== Qualification standards ==
A standard	B standard
5.72 m	5.60 m

== Schedule ==
Date	Time	Round
August 27, 2011	10:40	Qualification
August 29, 2011	19:25	Final

== Results ==
=== Qualification ===
Qualification: Qualifying Performance 5.70 (Q) or at least 12 best performers (q) advance to the final.

Rank	Group	Name	Nationality	5.20	5.35	5.50	5.60	5.65	Result	Notes
1	A	Romain Mesnil	France	-	-	o	-	o	5.65	q
1	A	Konstadinos Filippidis	Greece	-	o	o	o	o	5.65	q
1	A	Dmitry Starodubtsev	Russia	-	o	o	o	o	5.65	q
1	B	Lázaro Borges	Cuba	-	o	o	o	o	5.65	q
1	B	Renaud Lavillenie	France	-	-	o	-	o	5.65	q
6	A	Fábio Gomes da Silva	Brazil	-	-	o	xo	o	5.65	q
6	A	Malte Mohr	Germany	-	-	xo	o	o	5.65	q
8	A	Mateusz Didenkow	Poland	-	o	o	o	xo	5.65	q
9	B	Jeremy Scott	United States	-	o	o	o	-	5.60	q
10	B	Łukasz Michalski	Poland	-	o	xo	o	x-	5.60	q
10	B	Derek Miles	United States	-	o	xo	o	-	5.60	q
12	A	Daichi Sawano	Japan	-	-	o	xxx		5.50	q
12	A	Paweł Wojciechowski	Poland	-	o	o	xxx		5.50	q
12	B	Jan Kudlička	Czech Republic	-	o	o	xxx		5.50	q
12	B	Steven Lewis	Great Britain & N.I.	o	o	o	xxx		5.50	q
12	B	Igor Bychkov	Spain	o	-	o	x-	xx	5.50	q
17	A	Alhaji Jeng	Sweden	-	xo	o	xxx		5.50	
18	B	Jérôme Clavier	France	-	o	xo	-	xxx	5.50	
18	B	Yevgeny Lukyanenko	Russia	-	o	xo	xxx		5.50	
20	A	Raphael Holzdeppe	Germany	-	-	xxo	xxx		5.50	
21	B	Giovanni Lanaro	Mexico	-	xo	xxo	xxx		5.50	
22	A	Mark Hollis	United States	-	o	xxx			5.35	
22	B	Denys Yurchenko	Ukraine	-	o	xxx			5.35	
24	A	Jere Bergius	Finland	-	xo	-	xxx		5.35	
24	B	Karsten Dilla	Germany	-	xo	-	xxx		5.35	
26	B	Kim Yoo-suk	South Korea	o	xxx				5.20	
	A	Steven Hooker	Australia	-	-	xxx			NM	
	A	Edi Maia	Portugal	xxx					NM	

=== Final ===
Rank	Name	Nationality	5.50	5.65	5.75	5.85	5.90	5.95	Result	Notes
1st place, gold medalist(s)	Paweł Wojciechowski	Poland	o	o	o	x-	xo	xxx	5.90	
2nd place, silver medalist(s)	Lázaro Borges	Cuba	o	o	xxo	o	xxo	xxx	5.90	NR
3rd place, bronze medalist(s)	Renaud Lavillenie	France	-	o	o	o	xxx		5.85	
4	Łukasz Michalski	Poland	o	o	xo	o	xxx		5.85	PB
5	Malte Mohr	Germany	o	xo	o	xxo	xxx		5.85	
6	Konstadinos Filippidis	Greece	o	xo	xo	xxx			5.75	NR
7	Mateusz Didenkow	Poland	xo	xo	xxo	xxx			5.75	=PB
8	Fábio Gomes da Silva	Brazil	xo	o	xxx				5.65	
9	Jan Kudlička	Czech Republic	o	xo	xxx				5.65	SB
9	Steven Lewis	Great Britain & N.I.	o	xo	xxx				5.65	SB
9	Jeremy Scott	United States	o	xo	xxx				5.65	
12	Dmitry Starodubtsev	Russia	xo	xo	xxx				5.65	
13	Derek Miles	United States	o	xxo	xxx				5.65	
14	Daichi Sawano	Japan	xo	xxo	xxx				5.65	SB
	Romain Mesnil	France	-	xxx					NM	
	Igor Bychkov	Spain	xxx						NM	
