= 2011 World Championships in Athletics – Men's 200 metres =

Men's 200 metres at the 2011 World Championships
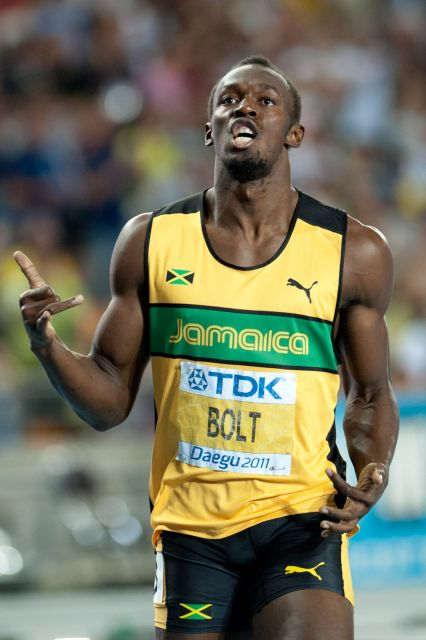
- Usain Bolt winning the 200m
- Venue: Daegu Stadium
- Dates: 2 September (heats and semi-finals); 3 September (final)
- Competitors: 53
- Winning time: 19.40

Medalists
gold medal	Usain Bolt	Jamaica
silver medal	Walter Dix	United States
bronze medal	Christophe Lemaitre	France

Official Video

The men's 200 metres at the 2011 World Championships in Athletics was held at the Daegu Stadium on September 2 and September 3. The winning margin was 0.30 seconds. Usain Bolt, the world record holder and defending champion was the favourite going into the race with a world leading time of 19.86 seconds. He had also won his three major races after return from injury convincingly.

Remembering his false start in the 100 metres, favorite Bolt had the slowest reaction time to the gun, but cruised easily into the semi-finals.

The semi-finals began with another false start, but it was Sandro Viana. Christophe Lemaitre led the qualifying winning semi 1, as Bolt casually cruised through semi 2 and Walter Dix ran a controlled semi 3.

The finals were Bolt's redemption. Still cautious, Bolt had the slowest reaction time in the field, but he easily charged into the lead, making up the stagger on Dix 2/3 of the way through the turn as returning silver medalist Alonso Edward pulled up. Bolt made one glance back at Dix and the rest of the field, then charged home in 19.40 his third best time, the number four time ever. Dix was clearly second in 19.70, with Christophe Lemaitre separating from Jaysuma Saidy Ndure in 19.80, the French National Record for the bronze medal. The rest of the field was more than 3/10ths of a second behind. Note these were Fully automatic times, it was just a fluke that all the medal times were evenly divisible by a tenth of a second.

== Medalists ==
Gold	Silver	Bronze
Usain Bolt; Jamaica	Walter Dix; United States	Christophe Lemaitre; France

== Records ==
Prior to the competition, the men's 200 m records were as follows:

World record	Usain Bolt (JAM)	19.19	Berlin, Germany	20 August 2009
Championship record	Usain Bolt (JAM)	19.19	Berlin, Germany	20 August 2009
World leading	Usain Bolt (JAM)	19.86	Oslo, Norway	9 June 2011
African record	Frankie Fredericks (NAM)	19.68	Atlanta, United States	1 August 1996
Asian Record	Shingo Suetsugu (JPN)	20.03	Yokohama, Japan	7 June 2003
North, Central American and Caribbean record	Usain Bolt (JAM)	19.19	Berlin, Germany	20 August 2009
South American record	Alonso Edward (PAN)	19.81	Berlin, Germany	20 August 2009
European record	Pietro Mennea (ITA)	19.72	Mexico City, Mexico	12 September 1979
Oceanian record	Peter Norman (AUS)	20.06	Mexico City, Mexico	16 October 1968

== Qualification standards ==
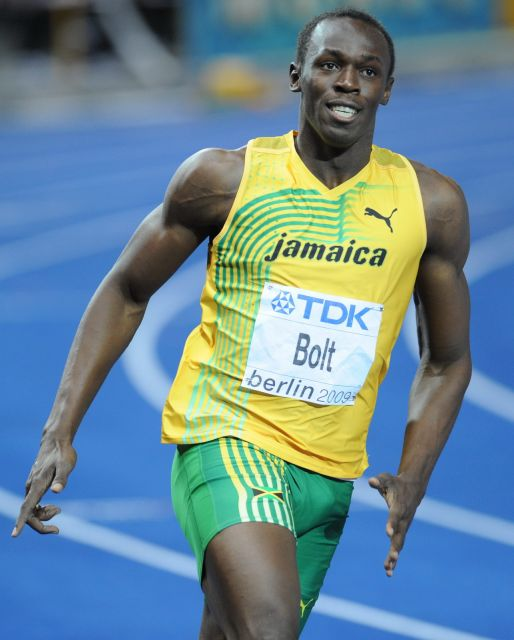
Usain Bolt the defending champion

A time	B time
20.60	20.70

schedule

Date	Time	Round
September 2, 2011	11:10	Heats
September 2, 2011	19:55	Semifinals
September 3, 2011	21:20	Final

== Results ==
KEY:	q	Fastest non-qualifiers	Q	Qualified	NR	National record	PB	Personal best	SB	Seasonal best

=== Heats ===
Qualification: First 3 in each heat (Q) and the next 3 fastest (q) advance to the semifinals.

Wind:
Heat 1: +0.3 m/s, Heat 2: -0.3 m/s, Heat 3: -1.1 m/s, Heat 4: -1.1 m/s, Heat 5: -0.8 m/s, Heat 6: +0.4 m/s, Heat 7: -0.7 m/s

Rank	Heat	Name	Nationality	Time	Notes
1	2	Usain Bolt	Jamaica	20.30	Q
2	1	Walter Dix	United States	20.42	Q
3	1	Amr Ibrahim Mostafa Seoud	Egypt	20.44	Q, SB
4	2	Michael Mathieu	Bahamas	20.46	Q
5	5	Nickel Ashmeade	Jamaica	20.47	Q
6	4	Christophe Lemaitre	France	20.51	Q
7	1	Kim Collins	Saint Kitts and Nevis	20.52	Q, SB
8	1	Femi Seun Ogunode	Qatar	20.54	q
9	6	Alonso Edward	Panama	20.55	Q
10	5	Sandro Viana	Brazil	20.62	Q
11	2	Pavel Maslák	Czech Republic	20.63	Q, PB
11	6	Bruno de Barros	Brazil	20.63	Q
13	3	Jaysuma Saidy Ndure	Norway	20.65	Q
14	2	Christian Malcolm	Great Britain & N.I.	20.66	q
15	7	Rondel Sorrillo	Trinidad and Tobago	20.68	Q
15	7	Mario Forsythe	Jamaica	20.68	Q
17	2	Churandy Martina	Netherlands	20.70	q
18	2	Bryan Barnett	Canada	20.75	
19	7	Michael Herrera	Cuba	20.76	Q
20	6	Reto Schenkel	Switzerland	20.77	Q
21	3	Darvis Patton	United States	20.80	Q
21	5	Hitoshi Saito	Japan	20.80	Q
23	1	Marc Schneeberger	Switzerland	20.81	
24	5	James Ellington	Great Britain & N.I.	20.82	
25	6	Jared Connaughton	Canada	20.83	
26	3	Jonathan Åstrand	Finland	20.87	Q
26	4	Shinji Takahira	Japan	20.87	Q
26	7	Daniel Grueso	Colombia	20.87	
29	7	Marek Niit	Estonia	20.90	
30	5	Jeremy Dodson	United States	20.92	
31	7	Nilson André	Brazil	20.93	
32	1	Sebastian Ernst	Germany	20.95	
33	2	Emmanuel Callander	Trinidad and Tobago	20.97	
33	6	Ben Youssef Meité	Ivory Coast	20.97	
35	3	Paul Hession	Ireland	21.02	
36	4	Mosito Lehata	Lesotho	21.03	Q
37	6	Thuso Mpuang	South Africa	21.07	
38	4	Lebogang Moeng	South Africa	21.09	
38	4	Marvin Anderson	Jamaica	21.09	
40	7	Arnaldo Abrantes	Portugal	21.10	
41	5	Gabriel Mvumvure	Zimbabwe	21.11	
42	5	Calvin Dascent	U.S. Virgin Islands	21.15	
43	3	Brijesh Lawrence	Saint Kitts and Nevis	21.16	
44	3	Rolando Palacios	Honduras	21.22	
45	4	Alex Wilson	Switzerland	21.25	
46	3	Yuichi Kobayashi	Japan	21.27	
47	1	Sibusiso Matsenjwa	Swaziland	21.29	PB
48	6	Omar Jouma Al-Salfa	United Arab Emirates	21.45	
49	7	Holder da Silva	Guinea-Bissau	21.82	SB
50	4	Leeroy Henriette	Seychelles	21.83	
51	1	Roudy Monrose	Haiti	22.18	
52	6	Luka Rakić	Montenegro	22.73	
53	3	Khalilur Rahman	Bangladesh	23.53	
	4	Brendan Christian	Antigua and Barbuda	DNS	

=== Semifinals ===
Qualification: First 2 in each heat (Q) and the next 2 fastest (q) advance to the final.

Wind:
Heat 1: -1.0 m/s, Heat 2: -1.0 m/s, Heat 3: -0.7 m/s

Rank	Heat	Name	Nationality	Time	Notes
1	1	Christophe Lemaitre	France	20.17	Q, SB
2	2	Usain Bolt	Jamaica	20.31	Q
3	1	Nickel Ashmeade	Jamaica	20.32	Q
4	3	Walter Dix	United States	20.37	Q
5	2	Jaysuma Saidy Ndure	Norway	20.50	Q
6	3	Alonso Edward	Panama	20.52	Q
7	2	Bruno de Barros	Brazil	20.54	q
8	2	Rondel Sorrillo	Trinidad and Tobago	20.56	q
9	1	Femi Seun Ogunode	Qatar	20.58	
10	3	Mario Forsythe	Jamaica	20.63	
11	1	Kim Collins	Saint Kitts and Nevis	20.64	
12	2	Darvis Patton	United States	20.72	
13	3	Michael Herrera	Cuba	20.75	
14	1	Pavel Maslák	Czech Republic	20.87	
15	3	Christian Malcolm	Great Britain & N.I.	20.88	
16	3	Shinji Takahira	Japan	20.90	
17	3	Jonathan Åstrand	Finland	21.03	
18	3	Amr Ibrahim Mostafa Seoud	Egypt	21.15	
19	2	Hitoshi Saito	Japan	21.17	
20	2	Reto Schenkel	Switzerland	21.18	
	1	Michael Mathieu	Bahamas	DNF	
	1	Sandro Viana	Brazil	DQ	R 162.7
	1	Mosito Lehata	Lesotho	DNS	
	2	Churandy Martina	Netherlands	DNS	

=== Final ===
Wind: +0.8 m/s

Rank	Lane	Name	Nationality	Time	Notes
1st place, gold medalist(s)	3	Usain Bolt	Jamaica	19.40	WL
2nd place, silver medalist(s)	4	Walter Dix	United States	19.70	SB
3rd place, bronze medalist(s)	6	Christophe Lemaitre	France	19.80	NR
4	8	Jaysuma Saidy Ndure	Norway	19.95	SB
5	5	Nickel Ashmeade	Jamaica	20.29	
6	2	Bruno de Barros	Brazil	20.31	
7	1	Rondel Sorrillo	Trinidad and Tobago	20.34	
	7	Alonso Edward	Panama	DNF	
