= 2011 World Championships in Athletics – Men's decathlon =

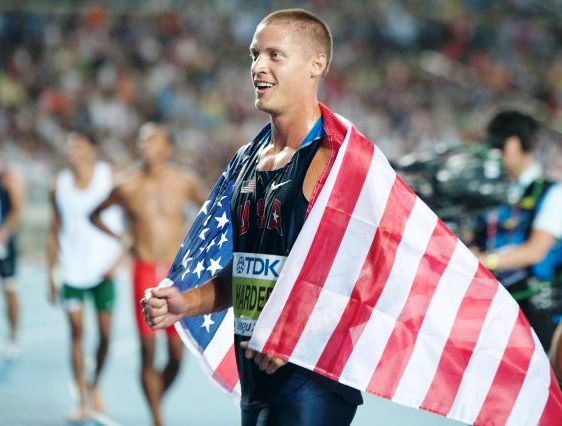
Trey Hardee celebrating in Daegu

Day 1-1 Video Day 1-2 Video Day 2-1 Video Day 2-2 Video

The Men's decathlon at the 2011 World Championships in Athletics was held at the Daegu Stadium on August 27 and 28.

Ashton Eaton started off strongly, taking a 22-point advantage in the 100m over American teammate Trey Hardee, then adding three more points in the long jump. Oleksiy Kasyanov placed himself in third. Defending champion Hardee pulled back that advantage to take a 6-point lead after the shot put. Aleksey Drozdov blew past the field with a 2.14 high jump, but cumulatively it was only a short lived 2-point lead. And the faster Eaton took the 400m and a 53-point lead over Hardee at the end of Day 1.

The second day was more of the same, Eaton's speed over the 110 hurdles extended his lead to 69 points over Hardee, but considering how much faster Eaton normally is vs Hardee, he didn't extend the lead enough. Kasyanov was the best of the rest now almost 170 points behind the leaders. The discus was the reversal of fortunes. Hardee threw over 3 and a half metres further and took an 8-point lead. In the pole vault, Eaton's 4.60 was the poorest of the top 16, losing 20 cm to Hardee, while Leonel Suárez vaulted 5.00 to slide into third, barely ahead of Drozdov. In the javelin, Eaton only managed a 55.16, while Hardee went 68.99 and Suárez bettered that with 69.12 to move into second place by 32 points. With a 244-point lead, Hardee was not going to be caught from behind. It was predictable that Suárez needed to finish within 4.8 seconds of Eaton to hold on to silver. With Suárez' personal best in the 1500m at around 4:16, and Eaton's best around 4:20, it looked like a foregone conclusion. But Eaton went out aggressively, taking the lead on the final lap and powering close to a 65-second last lap to get a personal best 4:18.94. Eaton beat Suárez by 5.22 seconds to edge 4 points ahead and take the silver medal.

== Medalists ==
Gold	Silver	Bronze
Trey Hardee; United States	Ashton Eaton; United States	Leonel Suárez; Cuba

== Records ==
World record	Roman Šebrle (CZE)	9026	Götzis, Austria	27 May 2001
Championship record	Tomáš Dvořák (CZE)	8902	Edmonton, Canada	7 August 2001
World leading	Ashton Eaton (USA)	8729	Eugene, United States	24 June 2011
African record	Larbi Bouraada (ALG)	8302	Ratingen, Germany	17 July 2011
Asian record	Dmitriy Karpov (KAZ)	8725	Athens, Greece	24 August 2004
North, Central American and Caribbean record	Dan O'Brien (USA)	8891	Talence, France	5 September 1992
South American record	Tito Steiner (ARG)	8291	Provo, United States	23 June 1983
European record	Roman Šebrle (CZE)	9026	Götzis, Austria	27 May 2001
Oceanian record	Jagan Hames (AUS)	8490	Kuala Lumpur, Malaysia	18 September 1998

== Qualification standards ==
A standard	B standard
8200 pts	8000 pts

== Schedule ==
Date	Time	Round
August 27, 2011	10:00	100 metres
August 27, 2011	11:00	Long jump
August 27, 2011	12:50	Shot put
August 27, 2011	20:00	High jump
August 27, 2011	22:40	400 metres
August 28, 2011	09:05	110 metres hurdles
August 28, 2011	10:00	Discus throw
August 28, 2011	13:00	Pole vault
August 28, 2011	16:30	Javelin throw
August 28, 2011	20:15	1500 metres
August 28, 2011	20:15	Final standings

== Results ==
=== 100 metres ===
Wind:
Heat 1: -0.5 m/s, Heat 2: +0.5 m/s, Heat 3: -0.2 m/s, Heat 4: 0.0 m/s

Rank	Heat	Athlete	Nationality	Result	Points	Notes
1	1	Ashton Eaton	United States	10.46	985	
2	1	Trey Hardee	United States	10.55	963	
3	1	Damian Warner	Canada	10.56	961	
4	1	Luiz Alberto de Araújo	Brazil	10.71	926	SB
5	1	Oleksiy Kasyanov	Ukraine	10.75	917	SB
6	2	Eelco Sintnicolaas	Netherlands	10.76	915	SB
7	1	Mihail Dudaš	Serbia	10.81	903	
8	2	Ingmar Vos	Netherlands	10.82	901	SB
9	1	Rico Freimuth	Germany	10.83	899	
10	2	Yordanis García	Cuba	10.85	894	SB
10	2	Andres Raja	Estonia	10.85	894	SB
12	4	Larbi Bouraada	Algeria	10.88	888	SB
13	2	Darius Draudvila	Lithuania	10.90	883	
14	2	Jamie Adjetey-Nelson	Canada	10.97	867	
15	2	Maurice Smith	Jamaica	10.98	865	
16	3	Brent Newdick	New Zealand	11.00	861	
17	3	Leonel Suárez	Cuba	11.07	845	
18	3	Pascal Behrenbruch	Germany	11.08	843	
19	3	Kim Kun-Woo	South Korea	11.11	836	SB
20	3	Willem Coertzen	South Africa	11.16	825	
21	4	Jan Felix Knobel	Germany	11.18	821	
22	4	Hadi Sepehrzad	Iran	11.19	819	SB
23	3	Romain Barras	France	11.20	817	
23	4	Thomas van der Plaetsen	Belgium	11.20	817	PB
25	3	Dmitriy Karpov	Kazakhstan	11.24	808	
26	4	Roman Šebrle	Czech Republic	11.25	806	
27	3	Mikk Pahapill	Estonia	11.28	799	
28	4	Ryan Harlan	United States	11.29	797	
29	4	Aleksey Drozdov	Russia	11.34	786	
30	4	Keisuke Ushiro	Japan	11.42	769	

=== Long jump ===
Rank	Group	Athlete	Nationality	#1	#2	#3	Result	Points	Notes	Overall
1	A	Thomas van der Plaetsen	Belgium	7.79	–	–	7.79	1007	PB	1824
2	A	Oleksiy Kasyanov	Ukraine	7.46	7.59	x	7.59	957	SB	1874
3	A	Ashton Eaton	United States	x	7.46	7.21	7.46	925		1910
4	A	Aleksey Drozdov	Russia	7.05	7.30	7.45	7.45	922	SB	1708
4	A	Trey Hardee	United States	x	7.45	x	7.45	922		1885
6	B	Larbi Bouraada	Algeria	x	7.41	7.42	7.42	915	SB	1803
7	A	Mihail Dudaš	Serbia	7.41	7.15	7.33	7.41	913		1816
8	A	Ingmar Vos	Netherlands	7.41	–	–	7.41	913		1814
9	A	Willem Coertzen	South Africa	x	7.37	7.33	7.37	903	SB	1728
10	A	Damian Warner	Canada	7.35	x	x	7.35	898		1859
11	B	Leonel Suárez	Cuba	6.95	6.66	7.33	7.33	893	SB	1738
12	A	Brent Newdick	New Zealand	7.31	7.14	x	7.31	888		1749
13	B	Jan Felix Knobel	Germany	7.15	7.30	7.27	7.30	886	PB	1707
14	A	Roman Šebrle	Czech Republic	7.30	7.18	7.22	7.30	886		1692
15	A	Eelco Sintnicolaas	Netherlands	x	x	7.29	7.29	883		1798
16	B	Kim Kun-Woo	South Korea	7.22	7.24	x	7.24	871	SB	1707
17	A	Andres Raja	Estonia	7.21	7.21	7.16	7.21	864		1758
18	B	Jamie Adjetey-Nelson	Canada	x	7.21	x	7.21	864		1731
19	A	Darius Draudvila	Lithuania	7.14	7.19	x	7.19	859		1742
20	A	Mikk Pahapill	Estonia	x	x	7.12	7.12	842		1641
21	B	Romain Barras	France	7.05	x	7.06	7.06	828		1645
22	B	Maurice Smith	Jamaica	x	x	7.06	7.06	828		1693
23	B	Keisuke Ushiro	Japan	6.87	6.76	6.96	6.96	804		1573
24	B	Dmitriy Karpov	Kazakhstan	6.69	6.86	6.64	6.86	781		1589
25	B	Pascal Behrenbruch	Germany	6.67	6.80	6.76	6.80	767		1610
26	B	Luiz Alberto de Araújo	Brazil	x	6.74	x	6.74	753		1679
27	B	Ryan Harlan	United States	6.55	6.68	x	6.68	739		1536
28	B	Hadi Sepehrzad	Iran	6.43	6.27	6.65	6.65	732	SB	1551
29	B	Yordanis García	Cuba	x	6.56	6.24	6.56	711		1605
	B	Rico Freimuth	Germany	x	x	x	NM	0		899

=== Shot put ===
Rank	Group	Athlete	Nationality	#1	#2	#3	Result	Points	Notes	Overall
1	A	Ryan Harlan	United States	16.49	16.23	x	16.49	882		2418
2	A	Aleksey Drozdov	Russia	x	16.17	x	16.17	862		2570
3	A	Jan Felix Knobel	Germany	14.72	15.86	16.06	16.06	855	PB	2562
4	A	Pascal Behrenbruch	Germany	15.91	15.73	16.01	16.01	852		2462
5	A	Dmitriy Karpov	Kazakhstan	15.69	x	14.91	15.69	832		2421
6	A	Hadi Sepehrzad	Iran	15.31	15.20	15.65	15.65	830		2381
7	A	Roman Šebrle	Czech Republic	15.05	x	15.20	15.20	802		2494
8	A	Maurice Smith	Jamaica	15.15	15.14	x	15.15	799		2492
9	A	Trey Hardee	United States	15.09	x	15.09	15.09	795		2680
10	A	Yordanis García	Cuba	14.52	14.12	14.93	14.93	785		2390
11	A	Romain Barras	France	14.61	14.66	14.92	14.92	785		2430
12	A	Darius Draudvila	Lithuania	x	14.38	14.81	14.81	778		2520
13	A	Luiz Alberto de Araújo	Brazil	14.45	14.77	14.76	14.77	776		2455
14	A	Mikk Pahapill	Estonia	14.76	14.08	x	14.76	775		2416
15	A	Andres Raja	Estonia	14.39	x	14.61	14.61	766		2524
16	B	Leonel Suárez	Cuba	14.54	13.57	14.25	14.54	761	SB	2499
17	B	Ashton Eaton	United States	14.44	x	x	14.44	755		2665
18	B	Oleksiy Kasyanov	Ukraine	14.29	14.43	x	14.43	755	SB	2629
19	B	Eelco Sintnicolaas	Netherlands	13.50	12.98	14.13	14.13	736		2534
20	B	Ingmar Vos	Netherlands	13.72	13.73	13.86	13.86	720		2534
21	B	Mihail Dudaš	Serbia	13.67	13.76	x	13.76	714		2530
22	B	Brent Newdick	New Zealand	13.75	x	13.25	13.75	713		2462
23	B	Willem Coertzen	South Africa	x	13.48	13.01	13.48	697		2425
24	B	Damian Warner	Canada	12.92	x	13.26	13.26	683		2542
25	B	Larbi Bouraada	Algeria	13.11	13.10	x	13.11	674	SB	2477
26	B	Kim Kun-Woo	South Korea	12.61	12.59	12.96	12.96	665	SB	2372
27	B	Keisuke Ushiro	Japan	x	12.88	12.71	12.88	660		2233
28	B	Thomas van der Plaetsen	Belgium	11.99	12.76	12.63	12.76	653		2477
	B	Rico Freimuth	Germany	x	–	–	NM	0		899
	B	Jamie Adjetey-Nelson	Canada				DNS	–		DNF

=== High jump ===
Rank	Group	Athlete	Nationality	1.81	1.84	1.87	1.90	1.93	1.96	1.99	2.02	2.05	2.08	2.11	2.14	2.17	Result	Points	Notes	Overall
1	A	Thomas van der Plaetsen	Belgium	–	–	–	–	–	o	–	o	o	xo	o	o	xxo	2.17	963	PB	3440
2	A	Aleksey Drozdov	Russia	–	–	–	–	o	–	o	o	o	xxo	xo	xo	xxx	2.14	934	SB	3504
3	A	Leonel Suárez	Cuba	–	–	–	–	o	–	xo	o	xo	xxx				2.05	850		3349
4	A	Roman Šebrle	Czech Republic	–	–	–	–	–	o	o	o	xxo	xxx				2.05	850		3344
5	A	Ryan Harlan	United States	–	–	–	–	o	o	o	o	xxx					2.02	822		3240
6	A	Yordanis García	Cuba	–	–	–	o	–	xo	xxo	o	xxx					2.02	822		3212
7	A	Mikk Pahapill	Estonia	–	–	–	o	–	o	–	xo	xxx					2.02	822		3238
7	A	Willem Coertzen	South Africa	–	–	–	o	o	o	o	xo	xxx					2.02	822		3247
7	A	Mihail Dudaš	Serbia	–	–	–	o	–	o	o	xo	xxx					2.02	822	SB	3352
7	A	Ashton Eaton	United States	–	–	–	–	–	o	o	xo	xxx					2.02	822		3487
11	B	Trey Hardee	United States	–	–	–	–	o	–	xxo	xo	xxx					2.02	822	SB	3502
12	A	Keisuke Ushiro	Japan	–	–	–	o	–	xo	o	xxo	xxx					2.02	822		3055
13	B	Damian Warner	Canada	–	o	o	o	o	xxo	xxo	xxo	xxx					2.02	822		3364
14	A	Andres Raja	Estonia	–	–	–	o	–	o	o	xxx						1.99	794		3318
15	A	Oleksiy Kasyanov	Ukraine	–	–	–	xo	–	o	o	xxx						1.99	794		3423
16	B	Romain Barras	France	–	–	o	–	o	xxo	o	xxx						1.99	794	SB	3224
17	B	Darius Draudvila	Lithuania	–	–	–	o	o	o	xxx							1.96	767		3287
18	A	Larbi Bouraada	Algeria	–	–	–	–	xo	o	xxx							1.96	767		3244
19	B	Jan Felix Knobel	Germany	–	o	xo	o	xo	xo	xxx							1.96	767	PB	3329
20	B	Kim Kun-Woo	South Korea	–	–	o	o	o	xxo	xxx							1.96	767	SB	3139
21	B	Brent Newdick	New Zealand	–	o	–	o	xo	xxo	xxx							1.96	767	SB	3229
22	B	Maurice Smith	Jamaica	–	–	o	xo	o	xxx								1.93	740	SB	3232
23	B	Eelco Sintnicolaas	Netherlands	–	xo	xo	xo	o	xxx								1.93	740		3274
24	B	Dmitriy Karpov	Kazakhstan	–	–	o	xo	xxo	xxx								1.93	740		3161
25	B	Pascal Behrenbruch	Germany	–	o	xxo	o	xxo	xxx								1.93	740		3202
26	B	Luiz Alberto de Araújo	Brazil	o	–	o	o	xxx									1.90	714		3169
27	B	Hadi Sepehrzad	Iran	o	o	xo	xo	xxx									1.90	714	PB	3095
	A	Ingmar Vos	Netherlands														DNS	–		DNF
	B	Rico Freimuth	Germany														DNS	–		DNF
	B	Jamie Adjetey-Nelson	Canada														DNS	–		DNF

=== 400 metres ===
Rank	Heat	Athlete	Nationality	Result	Points	Notes	Overall
1	1	Ashton Eaton	United States	46.99	959		4446
2	1	Larbi Bouraada	Algeria	47.34	941	SB	4185
3	1	Mihail Dudaš	Serbia	47.73	922		4274
4	2	Eelco Sintnicolaas	Netherlands	48.35	892	SB	4166
5	1	Trey Hardee	United States	48.37	891		4393
6	1	Oleksiy Kasyanov	Ukraine	48.46	887		4310
7	2	Luiz Alberto de Araújo	Brazil	48.48	886	PB	4055
8	2	Leonel Suárez	Cuba	49.17	853		4202
9	2	Willem Coertzen	South Africa	49.20	852		4099
10	1	Kim Kun-Woo	South Korea	49.24	850		3989
11	2	Thomas van der Plaetsen	Belgium	49.46	840		4280
11	3	Jan Felix Knobel	Germany	49.46	840		4169
13	2	Andres Raja	Estonia	49.47	839		4157
14	3	Romain Barras	France	49.50	838		4062
15	2	Yordanis García	Cuba	49.64	831		4043
16	4	Pascal Behrenbruch	Germany	49.90	819		4021
17	3	Brent Newdick	New Zealand	49.95	817		4046
18	3	Damian Warner	Canada	50.12	809		4173
19	3	Maurice Smith	Jamaica	50.27	802		4034
20	3	Darius Draudvila	Lithuania	50.55	789		4076
21	4	Mikk Pahapill	Estonia	50.65	785	SB	4023
22	4	Keisuke Ushiro	Japan	50.89	774		3829
23	4	Hadi Sepehrzad	Iran	50.92	773	SB	3868
24	4	Roman Šebrle	Czech Republic	51.18	761	SB	4105
25	4	Aleksey Drozdov	Russia	51.35	753	SB	4257
26	4	Ryan Harlan	United States	51.57	744		3984
27	3	Dmitriy Karpov	Kazakhstan	52.01	724		3885
	1	Rico Freimuth	Germany	DNS	DNS		DNF
	3	Jamie Adjetey-Nelson	Canada	DNS	DNS		DNF
	4	Ingmar Vos	Netherlands	DNS	DNS		DNF

=== 110 metres hurdles ===
Wind:
Heat 1: -0.8 m/s, Heat 2: -0.7 m/s, Heat 3: -0.5 m/s, Heat 4: -0.1 m/s

Rank	Heat	Athlete	Nationality	Result	Points	Notes	Overall
1	1	Ashton Eaton	United States	13.85	994		5440
2	1	Trey Hardee	United States	13.97	978		5371
3	1	Andres Raja	Estonia	14.04	969		5126
4	1	Damian Warner	Canada	14.19	950		5123
5	2	Luiz Alberto de Araújo	Brazil	14.25	942	SB	4997
6	2	Leonel Suárez	Cuba	14.29	937	SB	5139
7	3	Pascal Behrenbruch	Germany	14.33	932	SB	4953
8	2	Romain Barras	France	14.37	927		4989
9	2	Eelco Sintnicolaas	Netherlands	14.42	921		5087
10	2	Willem Coertzen	South Africa	14.48	913		5012
11	3	Mikk Pahapill	Estonia	14.54	906	SB	4929
12	3	Larbi Bouraada	Algeria	14.56	903	PB	5088
13	3	Dmitriy Karpov	Kazakhstan	14.64	894	SB	4779
14	2	Oleksiy Kasyanov	Ukraine	14.65	892		5202
15	1	Maurice Smith	Jamaica	14.68	889		4923
16	1	Yordanis García	Cuba	14.70	886		4929
17	3	Ryan Harlan	United States	14.71	885		4869
18	4	Roman Šebrle	Czech Republic	14.75	880	SB	4985
19	3	Thomas van der Plaetsen	Belgium	14.79	875		5155
20	3	Brent Newdick	New Zealand	14.86	867		4913
21	4	Mihail Dudaš	Serbia	14.89	863	SB	5137
22	4	Jan Felix Knobel	Germany	14.92	859		5028
23	2	Darius Draudvila	Lithuania	14.93	858		4934
24	4	Kim Kun-Woo	South Korea	14.95	856	SB	4845
25	4	Hadi Sepehrzad	Iran	14.95	856		4724
26	4	Keisuke Ushiro	Japan	15.20	825		4654
27	4	Aleksey Drozdov	Russia	15.49	791		5048

=== Discus throw ===
Rank	Group	Athlete	Nationality	#1	#2	#3	Result	Points	Notes	Overall
1	A	Aleksey Drozdov	Russia	x	x	50.29	50.29	876		5924
2	A	Hadi Sepehrzad	Iran	45.36	50.06	x	50.06	872		5596
3	A	Trey Hardee	United States	49.89	49.73	x	49.89	868	SB	6239
4	A	Pascal Behrenbruch	Germany	48.56	48.28	46.84	48.56	840	SB	5793
5	A	Jan Felix Knobel	Germany	47.93	46.16	x	47.93	827	PB	5855
6	A	Mikk Pahapill	Estonia	47.16	46.77	46.07	47.16	811		5740
7	A	Dmitriy Karpov	Kazakhstan	45.40	47.10	x	47.10	810		5589
8	A	Roman Šebrle	Czech Republic	44.98	46.93	x	46.93	807		5792
9	A	Luiz Alberto de Araújo	Brazil	45.05	45.12	46.46	46.46	797		5794
10	A	Leonel Suárez	Cuba	41.13	46.25	x	46.25	793		5932
11	A	Ashton Eaton	United States	46.17	x	45.70	46.17	791		6231
12	B	Brent Newdick	New Zealand	40.26	45.65	44.22	45.65	780		5693
13	A	Maurice Smith	Jamaica	45.20	45.63	44.57	45.63	780		5703
14	B	Mihail Dudaš	Serbia	42.86	43.97	x	43.97	746	PB	5883
15	B	Keisuke Ushiro	Japan	42.59	39.43	43.84	43.84	743		5397
16	A	Oleksiy Kasyanov	Ukraine	x	43.74	x	43.74	741		5943
17	B	Ryan Harlan	United States	43.52	42.61	x	43.52	736		5605
18	B	Andres Raja	Estonia	43.38	42.58	43.39	43.39	734		5860
19	B	Willem Coertzen	South Africa	42.02	43.13	x	43.13	728	PB	5740
20	B	Eelco Sintnicolaas	Netherlands	x	38.28	42.23	42.23	710	SB	5797
21	B	Damian Warner	Canada	x	40.75	41.71	41.71	699		5822
22	B	Romain Barras	France	35.19	x	41.65	41.65	698		5687
23	B	Kim Kun-Woo	South Korea	35.00	37.14	39.53	39.53	655		5500
24	B	Larbi Bouraada	Algeria	x	26.65	37.84	37.84	621		5709
25	B	Thomas van der Plaetsen	Belgium	34.76	37.20	36.83	37.20	608		5763
	B	Darius Draudvila	Lithuania	x	x	x	NM	0		4934
	B	Yordanis García	Cuba				DNS	–		DNF

=== Pole vault ===
Rank	Group	Athlete	Nationality	4.00	4.10	4.20	4.30	4.40	4.50	4.60	4.70	4.80	4.90	5.00	5.10	5.20	5.30	Result	Points	Notes	Overall
1	A	Eelco Sintnicolaas	Netherlands	–	–	–	–	–	–	–	–	–	–	–	–	xo	–	5.20	972		6769
2	A	Thomas van der Plaetsen	Belgium	–	–	–	–	–	–	–	–	–	o	–	o	xxx		5.10	941		6704
3	A	Aleksey Drozdov	Russia	–	–	–	–	–	–	o	–	xo	o	o	xxx			5.00	910		6834
4	A	Leonel Suárez	Cuba	–	–	–	–	–	xo	–	xo	–	xo	o	xxx			5.00	910	PB	6842
5	B	Romain Barras	France	–	–	–	–	–	–	–	–	o	o	xxo	xxx			5.00	910	SB	6597
6	B	Kim Kun-Woo	South Korea	–	–	–	–	–	xo	xo	–	xo	o	xxx				4.90	880	PB	6380
7	B	Mihail Dudaš	Serbia	–	–	–	–	o	o	xo	xo	xxo	xo	xxx				4.90	880	PB	6763
8	B	Pascal Behrenbruch	Germany	–	–	o	–	o	o	o	o	xo	xxo	xxx				4.90	880	PB	6673
9	A	Mikk Pahapill	Estonia	–	–	–	–	–	o	xxo	–	o	xxo	xxx				4.90	880		6620
10	B	Larbi Bouraada	Algeria	–	–	–	–	–	xxo	–	o	xo	xxo	xxx				4.90	880	PB	6589
11	A	Dmitriy Karpov	Kazakhstan	–	–	–	–	–	–	o	–	xo	–	xxx				4.80	849		6438
11	A	Trey Hardee	United States	–	–	–	–	–	–	–	–	xo	–	xxx				4.80	849		7088
13	A	Roman Šebrle	Czech Republic	–	–	–	o	–	xo	–	xxo	xxo	xx-	–	x			4.80	849		6641
14	B	Andres Raja	Estonia	–	–	–	–	o	–	o	o	xxx						4.70	819	SB	6679
15	A	Jan Felix Knobel	Germany	–	–	–	–	–	–	xxo	o	xxx						4.70	819		6674
16	B	Oleksiy Kasyanov	Ukraine	–	–	–	–	xo	o	xxo	o	xxx						4.70	819		6762
17	B	Luiz Alberto de Araújo	Brazil	–	–	–	–	–	o	xo	xxo	xxx						4.70	819	PB	6613
18	A	Ashton Eaton	United States	–	–	–	–	–	–	o	–	xxx						4.60	790		7021
19	B	Brent Newdick	New Zealand	–	–	–	o	–	o	–	xxx							4.50	760		6453
20	B	Damian Warner	Canada	–	–	xxo	xo	o	o	xxx								4.50	760	PB	6582
21	A	Keisuke Ushiro	Japan	–	–	–	–	xo	–	xxx								4.40	731		6128
	A	Ryan Harlan	United States	–	–	–	–	–	–	xxx								NM	0		5605
	B	Hadi Sepehrzad	Iran	xxx														NM	0		5596
	B	Willem Coertzen	South Africa	–	xxx													NM	0		5740
	A	Yordanis García	Cuba															DNS	–		DNF
	B	Maurice Smith	Jamaica															DNS	–		DNF
	B	Darius Draudvila	Lithuania															DNS	–		DNF

=== Javelin throw ===
Rank	Group	Athlete	Nationality	#1	#2	#3	Result	Points	Notes	Overall
1	A	Leonel Suárez	Cuba	69.12	67.01	69.08	69.12	876		7718
2	A	Trey Hardee	United States	68.99	66.40	64.03	68.99	874	PB	7962
3	A	Jan Felix Knobel	Germany	68.42	x	64.78	68.42	865		7539
4	A	Keisuke Ushiro	Japan	x	67.73	x	67.73	855		6983
5	B	Roman Šebrle	Czech Republic	61.11	67.28	63.13	67.28	848		7489
6	B	Pascal Behrenbruch	Germany	62.14	61.85	66.50	66.50	836		7509
7	A	Mikk Pahapill	Estonia	65.11	64.32	66.40	66.40	835		7455
8	A	Aleksey Drozdov	Russia	64.80	63.40	63.80	64.80	810	SB	7644
9	B	Romain Barras	France	61.81	63.25	61.55	63.25	787		7384
10	B	Eelco Sintnicolaas	Netherlands	57.99	61.07	60.40	61.07	754	SB	7523
11	B	Larbi Bouraada	Algeria	59.00	–	–	59.00	723	SB	7312
12	B	Mihail Dudaš	Serbia	56.40	55.86	58.93	58.93	722	PB	7485
13	B	Thomas van der Plaetsen	Belgium	58.91	53.58	53.27	58.91	721		7425
14	A	Ryan Harlan	United States	58.43	–	–	58.43	714		6319
15	A	Andres Raja	Estonia	56.59	56.51	57.35	57.35	698		7377
16	A	Brent Newdick	New Zealand	54.02	54.92	55.69	55.69	673		7126
17	A	Ashton Eaton	United States	46.94	55.07	55.17	55.17	665		7686
18	A	Damian Warner	Canada	52.11	x	54.61	54.61	657		7239
19	B	Luiz Alberto de Araújo	Brazil	51.13	54.38	53.48	54.38	654		7267
20	B	Kim Kun-Woo	South Korea	49.42	48.63	53.33	53.33	638		7018
21	B	Oleksiy Kasyanov	Ukraine	51.54	49.71	52.16	52.16	621	SB	7383
22	A	Dmitriy Karpov	Kazakhstan	46.91	45.92	–	46.91	543		6981
	A	Hadi Sepehrzad	Iran				DNS	–		DNF
	B	Yordanis García	Cuba				DNS	–		DNF
	B	Maurice Smith	Jamaica				DNS	–		DNF
	B	Darius Draudvila	Lithuania				DNS	–		DNF
	B	Willem Coertzen	South Africa				DNS	–		DNF

=== 1500 metres ===
Rank	Heat	Athlete	Nationality	Result	Points	Notes
1	1	Larbi Bouraada	Algeria	4:14.97	846	SB
2	1	Kim Kun-Woo	South Korea	4:15.63	842	SB
3	2	Ashton Eaton	United States	4:18.94	819	PB
4	2	Leonel Suárez	Cuba	4:24.16	783	SB
5	2	Eelco Sintnicolaas	Netherlands	4:25.40	775	
6	2	Mihail Dudaš	Serbia	4:26.06	771	SB
7	1	Romain Barras	France	4:29.19	750	
8	1	Oleksiy Kasyanov	Ukraine	4:29.35	749	
9	2	Mikk Pahapill	Estonia	4:35.41	709	SB
10	2	Pascal Behrenbruch	Germany	4:36.64	702	
11	2	Aleksey Drozdov	Russia	4:41.73	669	SB
12	2	Jan Felix Knobel	Germany	4:43.12	661	PB
13	1	Keisuke Ushiro	Japan	4:43.87	656	
14	2	Trey Hardee	United States	4:45.68	645	SB
15	2	Thomas van der Plaetsen	Belgium	4:45.86	644	
16	1	Luiz Alberto de Araújo	Brazil	4:47.29	635	
17	1	Brent Newdick	New Zealand	4:47.30	635	
18	1	Andres Raja	Estonia	4:52.28	605	
19	1	Damian Warner	Canada	4:54.37	593	
20	1	Dmitriy Karpov	Kazakhstan	4:58.41	569	
21	2	Roman Šebrle	Czech Republic	4:56.50	580	
22	1	Ryan Harlan	United States	5:21.63	442	

=== Final standings ===
Rank	Athlete	Nationality	Points	Notes
1st place, gold medalist(s)	Trey Hardee	United States	8607	
2nd place, silver medalist(s)	Ashton Eaton	United States	8505	
3rd place, bronze medalist(s)	Leonel Suárez	Cuba	8501	SB
4	Aleksey Drozdov	Russia	8313	
5	Eelco Sintnicolaas	Netherlands	8298	
6	Mihail Dudaš	Serbia	8256	NR
7	Pascal Behrenbruch	Germany	8211	
8	Jan Felix Knobel	Germany	8200	
9	Mikk Pahapill	Estonia	8164	
10	Larbi Bouraada	Algeria	8158	
11	Romain Barras	France	8134	SB
12	Oleksiy Kasyanov	Ukraine	8132	
13	Roman Šebrle	Czech Republic	8069	
13	Thomas van der Plaetsen	Belgium	8069	
15	Andres Raja	Estonia	7982	
16	Luiz Alberto de Araújo	Brazil	7902	
17	Kim Kun-Woo	South Korea	7860	NR
18	Damian Warner	Canada	7832	
19	Brent Newdick	New Zealand	7761	
20	Keisuke Ushiro	Japan	7639	
21	Dmitriy Karpov	Kazakhstan	7550	
22	Ryan Harlan	United States	6761	
	Maurice Smith	Jamaica	DNF	
	Jamie Adjetey-Nelson	Canada	DNF	
	Darius Draudvila	Lithuania	DNF	
	Ingmar Vos	Netherlands	DNF	
	Yordani García	Cuba	DNF	
	Hadi Sepehrzad	Iran	DNF	
	Rico Freimuth	Germany	DNF	
	Willem Coertzen	South Africa	DNF	
