= 2011 World Championships in Athletics – Women's 100 metres hurdles =

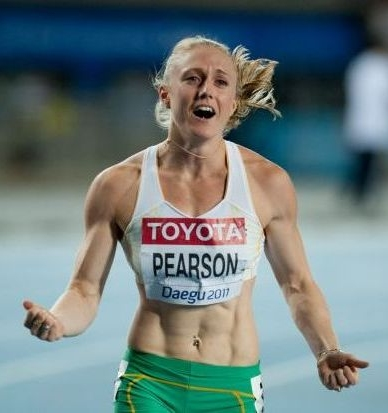
Sally Pearson after the finish in Daegu

Official Video

The women's 100 metres hurdles at the 2011 World Championships in Athletics was held at the Daegu Stadium on September 2 and 3.

Prior to the competition, Australian Sally Pearson led the season's rankings with a time of 12.48 seconds and was undefeated on the Diamond League circuit. The United States team provided the next fastest athletes that year in the form of Kellie Wells, Danielle Carruthers and the 2008 Olympic champion Dawn Harper. The defending champion Brigitte Foster-Hylton of Jamaica was in poor form, while the other 2009 medalists (Priscilla Lopes-Schliep and Delloreen Ennis-London) were absent. Tiffany Porter, Lisa Urech and Perdita Felicien were the only other top-ten-ranked athletes to compete.

Pearson won her semi final in 12.36, equal to the number 5 performer in history. The time improved on her own Oceanian area record and Australian national record. Wells had a large lead in her semi final, but clipped the ninth hurdle and struggled to maintain her balance as she finished in second.

In the final Pearson led from the gun and was not challenged, running 12.28, the fastest time in nearly two decades and moving her to fourth on the all-time list. The time is a new Championship record and again improved her Oceanian area record and Australian national record. Behind her, Carruthers outleaned Harper for the silver medal, both athletes finishing in the same time. Wells hit the seventh hurdle and did not finish.

== Medalists ==
Gold	Silver	Bronze
Sally Pearson; Australia	Danielle Carruthers; United States	Dawn Harper; United States

== Records ==
Prior to the competition, the records were as follows:

World record	Yordanka Donkova (BUL)	12.21	Stara Zagora, Bulgaria	20 August 1988
Championship record	Ginka Zagorcheva (BUL)	12.34	Rome, Italy	4 September 1987
World Leading	Sally Pearson (AUS)	12.48	Birmingham, Great Britain	10 July 2011
African Record	Glory Alozie (NGR)	12.44	Monaco	8 August 1998
African Record	Glory Alozie (NGR)	12.44	Brussels, Belgium	28 August 1998
African Record	Glory Alozie (NGR)	12.44	Seville, Spain	28 August 1999
Asian Record	Olga Shishigina (KAZ)	12.44	Luzern, Switzerland	27 June 1995
North, Central American and Caribbean record	Gail Devers (USA)	12.33	Sacramento, California, United States	23 July 2000
South American record	Maurren Higa Maggi (BRA)	12.71	Manaus, Brazil	19 May 2001
European Record	Yordanka Donkova (BUL)	12.21	Stara Zagora, Bulgaria	20 August 1988
Oceanian record	Sally Pearson (AUS)	12.48	Birmingham, Great Britain	10 July 2011

== Qualification standards ==
A time	B time
12.96	13.15

== Schedule ==
Date	Time	Round
September 2, 2011	10:20	Heats
September 3, 2011	19:15	Semifinals
September 3, 2011	21:00	Final

== Results ==
KEY:	q	Fastest non-qualifiers	Q	Qualified	NR	National record	PB	Personal best	SB	Seasonal best

=== Heats ===
Qualification: First 4 in each heat (Q) and the next 4 fastest (q) advance to the semifinals.

Wind:
Heat 1: +1.0 m/s, Heat 2: -0.6 m/s, Heat 3: -1.6 m/s, Heat 4: 0.0 m/s, Heat 5: +1.3 m/s

Rank	Heat	Name	Nationality	Time	Notes
1	2	Sally Pearson	Australia	12.53	Q
2	1	Kellie Wells	United States	12.73	Q
3	4	Danielle Carruthers	United States	12.79	Q
4	1	Vonette Dixon	Jamaica	12.82	Q
5	3	Tiffany Porter	Great Britain & N.I.	12.84	Q
5	4	Phylicia George	Canada	12.84	Q
7	4	Lucie Škrobáková	Czech Republic	12.89	Q, SB
8	1	Nikkita Holder	Canada	12.90	Q, PB
8	5	Dawn Harper	United States	12.90	Q
10	5	Perdita Felicien	Canada	12.95	Q
11	1	Natalya Ivoninskaya	Kazakhstan	12.96	Q
11	4	Brigitte Foster-Hylton	Jamaica	12.96	Q, SB
13	3	Lina Flórez	Colombia	12.98	Q
14	4	Cindy Roleder	Germany	13.01	q
15	5	Sun Yawei	China	13.03	Q
16	3	Tatyana Dektyareva	Russia	13.05	Q
17	2	Derval O'Rourke	Ireland	13.07	Q
17	5	Sandra Gomis	France	13.07	Q
17	5	Indira Spence	Jamaica	13.07	Q, SB
17	1	Nevin Yanıt	Turkey	13.07	q, SB
21	4	Seun Adigun	Nigeria	13.13	q, SB
22	3	Lisa Urech	Switzerland	13.16	Q
23	2	Brigitte Merlano	Colombia	13.23	Q
24	2	Beate Schrott	Austria	13.25	Q
25	1	Sonata Tamošaitytė	Lithuania	13.28	
26	3	Marzia Caravelli	Italy	13.29	
27	2	Marina Tomić	Slovenia	13.36	
28	2	LaVonne Idlette	Dominican Republic	13.39	
28	2	Jung Hye-lim	South Korea	13.39	
30	5	Anastasiya Soprunova	Kazakhstan	13.43	
31	1	Kierre Beckles	Barbados	13.44	
32	4	Anne Zagré	Belgium	13.47	
33	3	Cindy Billaud	France	13.50	
34	3	Dedeh Erawati	Indonesia	13.56	
35	4	Béatrice Kamboulé	Burkina Faso	13.76	SB
36	5	Poon Pak Yan	Hong Kong	14.04	
37	1	Dipna Lim Prasad	Singapore	14.40	
38	3	Jeimy Bernárdez	Honduras	14.45	
—N/a	5	Demetra Arachovití	Cyprus	DNS	

=== Semifinals ===
Qualification: First 2 in each heat (Q) and the next 2 fastest (q) advance to the final.

Wind:
Heat 1: -0.1 m/s, Heat 2: +0.3 m/s, Heat 3: +0.7 m/s

Rank	Heat	Name	Nationality	Time	Notes
1	2	Sally Pearson	Australia	12.36	Q, WL, AR
2	3	Tiffany Porter	Great Britain & N.I.	12.56	Q, NR
3	3	Danielle Carruthers	United States	12.65	Q
4	1	Phylicia George	Canada	12.73	Q, PB
5	2	Dawn Harper	United States	12.74	Q
6	2	Tatyana Dektyareva	Russia	12.76	q, SB
7	1	Kellie Wells	United States	12.79	Q
8	3	Nikkita Holder	Canada	12.84	q, PB
9	1	Lisa Urech	Switzerland	12.86	
10	3	Brigitte Foster-Hylton	Jamaica	12.87	SB
11	2	Perdita Felicien	Canada	12.88	
12	3	Cindy Roleder	Germany	12.91	PB
13	2	Indira Spence	Jamaica	12.93	PB
14	1	Lina Flórez	Colombia	12.94	PB
15	2	Natalya Ivoninskaya	Kazakhstan	12.96	
16	2	Lucie Škrobáková	Czech Republic	12.98	
17	1	Vonette Dixon	Jamaica	13.00	
18	3	Beate Schrott	Austria	13.02	
19	2	Seun Adigun	Nigeria	13.14	
20	1	Sun Yawei	China	13.19	
21	3	Brigitte Merlano	Colombia	13.21	
22	1	Nevin Yanıt	Turkey	13.31	
23	1	Sandra Gomis	France	13.55	
—N/a	3	Derval O'Rourke	Ireland	DNS	

=== Final ===
Wind" +1.1 m/s

Rank	Lane	Name	Nationality	Time	Notes
1st place, gold medalist(s)	3	Sally Pearson	Australia	12.28	CR, AR, WL
2nd place, silver medalist(s)	6	Danielle Carruthers	United States	12.47	PB
3rd place, bronze medalist(s)	8	Dawn Harper	United States	12.47	PB
4	5	Tiffany Porter	Great Britain & N.I.	12.63	
5	1	Tatyana Dektyareva	Russia	12.82	
6	2	Nikkita Holder	Canada	12.93	
7	4	Phylicia George	Canada	17.97	
—N/a	7	Kellie Wells	United States	DNF	
