= Switzerland at the 2011 World Championships in Athletics =

- WA code: SUI
- National federation: Swiss Athletics
- Website: www.swiss-athletics.ch

in Daegu
- Competitors: 15
- Medals: Gold 0 Silver 0 Bronze 0 Total 0

World Championships in Athletics appearances
- 1976; 1980; 1983; 1987; 1991; 1993; 1995; 1997; 1999; 2001; 2003; 2005; 2007; 2009; 2011; 2013; 2015; 2017; 2019; 2022; 2023

Switzerland competed at the 2011 World Championships in Athletics from August 27 to September 4 in Daegu, South Korea.

== Team selection ==
A team of 18 athletes was announced to represent the country in the event. For the first time in history, Switzerland will send two 4 × 100 m relay teams to world championships. The team includes one athlete invited by the IPC for exhibition events: Manuela Schaer, 800m T53 (wheelchair) women.

The following athletes appeared on the preliminary Entry List, but not on the Official Start List of the specific event, resulting in a total number of 15 competitors:

KEY:	Did not participate	Competed in another event

	Event	Athlete
Men	4 x 100 metres relay	Aron Beyene
Women	4 x 100 metres relay	Mujinga Kambundji
Women	4 x 100 metres relay	Marisa Lavanchy

== Results ==
=== Men ===
Athlete	Event	Preliminaries		Heats		Semifinals		Final	
Athlete	Event	Time Width Height	Rank	Time Width Height	Rank	Time Width Height	Rank	Time Width Height	Rank
Reto Amaru Schenkel	100 metres			10.44	27	Did not advance			
Reto Amaru Schenkel	200 metres			20.77	20 Q	21.18	20	Did not advance	
Marc Schneeberger	200 metres			20.81	23	Did not advance			
Alex Wilson	200 metres			21.25	45	Did not advance			
Andreas Kundert	110 m hurdles			13.87	28	Did not advance			
Pascal Mancini; Reto Amaru Schenkel; Alex Wilson; Marc Schneeberger	4 x 100 metres relay			DNF				Did not advance	

=== Women ===
Athlete	Event	Preliminaries		Heats		Semifinals		Final	
Athlete	Event	Time Width Height	Rank	Time Width Height	Rank	Time Width Height	Rank	Time Width Height	Rank
Sabine Fischer	5000 metres			DNS				Did not advance	
Lisa Urech	100 m hurdles			13.16	22 Q	12.86	9	Did not advance	
Clélia Reuse; Jacqueline Gasser; Ellen Sprunger; Léa Sprunger	4 x 100 metres relay			44.04	14			Did not advance	
Marie Polli	20 kilometres walk							1:40:28	35
Irène Pusterla	Long jump	6.34	19					Did not advance	
Nicole Büchler	Pole vault	4.50 NR	16					Did not advance	
Anna Katharina Schmid	Pole vault	4.40	17					Did not advance	
