= Cuba at the 2011 World Championships in Athletics =

- WA code: CUB
- National federation: Federación Cubana de Atletismo

in Daegu
- Competitors: 31
- Medals: Gold 0 Silver 1 Bronze 3 Total 4

World Championships in Athletics appearances
- 1983; 1987; 1991; 1993; 1995; 1997; 1999; 2001; 2003; 2005; 2007; 2009; 2011; 2013; 2015; 2017; 2019; 2022; 2023

Cuba competed at the 2011 World Championships in Athletics from August 27 to September 4 in Daegu, South Korea.

== Team selection ==
The Federación Cubana de Atletismo announced a squad of 31 athletes for the competition. The team is led by two-time Triple Jump defending champion Yargelis Savigne and Olympic gold medallist and 110m Hurdles World record holder Dayron Robles.

The following athlete appeared on the preliminary Entry List, but not on the Official Start List of the specific event:

KEY:	Did not participate	Competed in another event

	Event	Athlete
Women	4 × 400 metres relay	Nelkis Casabona

== Medalists ==
The following competitors from Cuba won medals at the Championships:

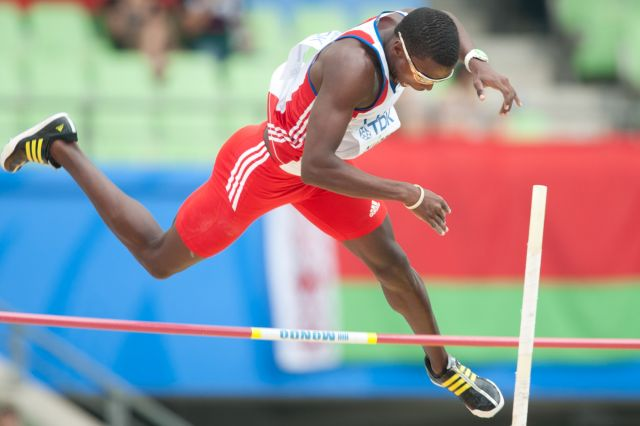
Leonel Suárez won a bronze medal in the Decathlon event at this year's championships

Medal	Athlete	Event
Silver	Lázaro Borges	Pole vault
Bronze	Guillermo Martínez	Javelin throw
Bronze	Leonel Suárez	Decathlon
Bronze	Yarelis Barrios	Discus throw

== Results ==
=== Men ===
Athlete	Event	Preliminaries		Heats		Semifinals		Final	
Athlete	Event	Time Width Height	Rank	Time Width Height	Rank	Time Width Height	Rank	Time Width Height	Rank
Michael Herrera	200 metres			20.76	19	20.75	13	Did not advance	
William Collazo	400 metres			45.89	23	46.13	21	Did not advance	
Dayron Robles	110 m hurdles			13.42	7	13.32	3	DSQ	
Omar Cisneros	400 m hurdles			49.69	19	50.10	21	Did not advance	
Alexis Copello	Triple jump	17.31	1					17.47	4
Yoandri Betanzos	Triple jump	17.01	8					16.67	11
Arnie David Giralt	Triple jump	16.74	13					Did not advance	
Víctor Moya	High jump	2.21	28					Did not advance	
Lázaro Borges	Pole vault	5.65	1					5.90 NR	2nd place, silver medalist(s)
Carlos Véliz	Shot put	20.24	10					19.70	12
Jorge Fernández	Discus throw	64.94	4					63.54	8
Guillermo Martínez	Javelin throw	83.77	1					84.30	3rd place, bronze medalist(s)

Decathlon

Leonel Suárez	Decathlon			
Leonel Suárez	Event	Results	Points	Rank
	100 m	11.07	845	17
	Long jump	7.33 (SB)	893	11
	Shot put	14.54 (SB)	761	16
	High jump	2.05	850	3
	400 m	49.17	853	8
	110 m hurdles	14.29 (SB)	937	6
	Discus throw	46.25	793	10
	Pole vault	5.00 (PB)	910	4
	Javelin throw	69.12	876	1
	1500 m	4:24.16 (SB)	783	4
Final			8501 (SB)	3rd place, bronze medalist(s)

Yordani García	Decathlon			
Yordani García	Event	Results	Points	Rank
	100 m	10.85 (SB)	894	10
	Long jump	6.56	711	29
	Shot put	14.93	785	10
	High jump	2.02	822	6
	400 m	49.64	831	15
	110 m hurdles	14.70	886	16
	Discus throw	DNS		
	Pole vault	DNS		
	Javelin throw	DNS		
	1500 m			
Final			DNF	

=== Women ===
Athlete	Event	Preliminaries		Heats		Semifinals		Final	
Athlete	Event	Time Width Height	Rank	Time Width Height	Rank	Time Width Height	Rank	Time Width Height	Rank
Nelkis Casabona	100 metres			11.45	32	Did not advance			
Nelkis Casabona	200 metres			23.21	22	23.32	19	Did not advance	
Aymée Martínez	400 metres			53.67	27	Did not advance			
Daisurami Bonne	400 metres			53.69	28	Did not advance			
Aymée Martínez; Diosmely Peña; Susana Clement; Daisurami Bonne	4 × 400 metres relay			3:26.74 SB	10			Did not advance	
Mabel Gay	Triple jump	14.53	2					14.67 PB	4
Yargelis Savigne	Triple jump	14.62	1					14.43	6
Yarianna Martínez	Triple jump	14.07	13					Did not advance	
Dailenis Alcántara	Triple jump	13.78	23					Did not advance	
Yarisley Silva	Pole vault	4.55	9					4.70 NR	5
Dailis Caballero	Pole vault	4.40	23					Did not advance	
Misleydis González	Shot put	18.24	16					Did not advance	
Mailín Vargas	Shot put	18.27	15					Did not advance	
Yarelis Barrios	Discus throw	63.80 Q	3					65.73 (SB)	3rd place, bronze medalist(s)
Denia Caballero	Discus throw	60.36 q	9					60.73	9
Yipsi Moreno	Hammer throw	73.29	2					74.48 SB	4
Yanet Cruz	Javelin throw	56.73	23					Did not advance	
