= Tatyana Dektyareva =

Former Russian track-and-field athlete

Personal information
- Full name: Tatyana Valeryevna Dektyareva
- Born: 8 May 1981 (age 45) Sverdlovsk, Soviet Union
- Height: 1.73 m (5 ft 8 in)

Sport
- Country: Russia
- Sport: Women's athletics
- Event: 100 metres hurdles

Achievements and titles
- World finals: 5th at the 2011 World Championships in Athletics
- Regional finals: 6th at the 2010 European Athletics Championships
- Personal bests: 60 m hurdles: 7.94 (February 2010); 100 m hurdles: 12.68 (June 2010)

Tatyana Valeryevna Dektyareva (Russian: Татьяна Валерьевна Дектярева; born 8 May 1981 in Yekaterinburg) is a Russian track and field athlete who specialises in the 100 metres hurdles.

== Doping ban ==
Dektyareva tested positive for the selective androgen receptor modulator Ostarine in an out-of-competition test 9 December 2014, and was subsequently handed a two-year ban from sport.

== International competitions ==
Representing Russia
Year	Competition	Venue	Position	Event	Notes
2008	Summer Olympics	Beijing, China	20th	100 m hurdles	13.05
2009	World Championships	Berlin, Germany	33rd	100 m hurdles	13.51
2010	World Indoor Championships	Doha, Qatar	8th	60 m hurdles	8.05
2010	European Team Championships	Bergen, Norway	1st	100 m hurdles	12.68, PB
2010	European Team Championships	Bergen, Norway	1st	100 m hurdles	12.98
2010	DécaNation	Annecy, France	1st	100 m hurdles	12.94
2011	World Championships	Daegu, South Korea	5th	100 m hurdles	12.82
2012	Summer Olympics	London, United Kingdom	8th (sf)	100 m hurdles	12.75, SB
2013	World Championships	Moscow, Russia	12th (sf)	100 m hurdles	12.91

== See also ==
- List of doping cases in athletics
- List of people from Yekaterinburg
