= 2011 World Championships in Athletics – Men's discus throw =

Official Video

The men's discus throw event at the 2011 World Championships in Athletics was held at the Daegu Stadium on August 29 and 30.

Defending champion Robert Harting was a clear winner, with three throws better than silver medalist Gerd Kanter.

== Medalists ==
Gold	Silver	Bronze
Robert Harting; Germany	Gerd Kanter; Estonia	Ehsan Haddadi; Iran

== Records ==
World record	Jürgen Schult (GDR)	74.08	Neubrandenburg, East Germany	6 June 1986
Championship record	Virgilijus Alekna (LTU)	70.14	Helsinki, Finland	7 August 2005
World leading	Zoltán Kővágó (HUN)	69.50	Budapest, Hungary	30 July 2011
African record	Frantz Kruger (RSA)	70.32	Salon-de-Provence, France	26 May 2002
Asian record	Ehsan Haddadi (IRI)	69.32	Tallinn, Estonia	3 June 2008
North, Central American and Caribbean record	Ben Plucknett (USA)	71.32	Eugene, OR, United States	4 June 1983
South American record	Jorge Balliengo (ARG)	66.32	Rosario, Argentina	15 April 2006
European record	Jürgen Schult (GDR)	74.08	Neubrandenburg, East Germany	6 June 1986
Oceanian record	Benn Harradine (AUS)	66.45	Split, Croatia	5 September 2010

== Qualification standards ==
A standard	B standard
65.00 m	63.00 m

== Schedule ==
Date	Time	Round
August 29, 2011	10:10	Qualification
August 30, 2011	19:55	Final

== Results ==
=== Qualification ===
Qualification: Qualifying Performance 65.50 (Q) or at least 12 best performers (q) advance to the final.

Rank	Group	Athlete	Nationality	#1	#2	#3	Result	Notes
1	B	Piotr Małachowski	Poland	64.22	x	65.48	65.48	q
2	A	Ehsan Haddadi	Iran	65.21	64.74	-	65.21	q
3	B	Mario Pestano	Spain	65.13	-	-	65.13	q
4	B	Jorge Fernández	Cuba	64.94	-	-	64.94	q
5	A	Robert Harting	Germany	64.93	63.75	-	64.93	q
6	A	Virgilijus Alekna	Lithuania	64.21	63.57	x	64.21	q
7	B	Märt Israel	Estonia	63.49	64.19	x	64.19	q
8	A	Vikas Gowda	India	62.37	63.99	61.85	63.99	q
9	A	Gerd Kanter	Estonia	62.77	63.50	x	63.50	q
10	A	Benn Harradine	Australia	x	63.49	51.86	63.49	q
11	A	Jason Young	United States	61.75	x	63.14	63.14	q
12	B	Brett Morse	Great Britain & N.I.	60.62	62.38	59.29	62.38	q
13	B	Jan Marcell	Czech Republic	60.46	62.29	59.26	62.29	
14	A	Jarred Rome	United States	58.86	62.22	61.00	62.22	
15	B	Zoltán Kővágó	Hungary	58.14	62.16	x	62.16	
16	B	Rutger Smith	Netherlands	60.17	59.64	62.12	62.12	
17	A	Wu Jian	China	59.51	62.07	x	62.07	
18	A	Jason Morgan	Jamaica	58.51	57.56	61.75	61.75	
19	B	Martin Wierig	Germany	x	x	61.68	61.68	
20	A	Erik Cadée	Netherlands	61.03	x	61.62	61.62	
21	B	Gerhard Mayer	Austria	61.47	55.33	59.60	61.47	
22	B	Leif Arrhenius	Sweden	61.33	x	x	61.33	
23	B	Mohammad Samimi	Iran	x	x	61.10	61.10	
24	B	Lance Brooks	United States	60.55	61.01	61.07	61.07	
25	B	Ercüment Olgundeniz	Turkey	53.34	x	60.86	60.86	
26	B	Markus Münch	Germany	58.27	60.80	60.59	60.80	
27	B	Martin Marić	Croatia	59.72	x	60.61	60.61	
28	A	Niklas Arrhenius	Sweden	60.57	x	x	60.57	
29	B	Carl Myerscough	Great Britain & N.I.	60.29	57.65	59.40	60.29	
30	A	Abdul Buhari	Great Britain & N.I.	x	60.21	58.37	60.21	
31	A	Roland Varga	Croatia	x	59.09	x	59.09	
	A	Róbert Fazekas	Hungary	x	x	x	NM	
	A	Frank Casañas	Spain				DNS	

=== Final ===
Rank	Athlete	Nationality	#1	#2	#3	#4	#5	#6	Result	Notes
1st place, gold medalist(s)	Robert Harting	Germany	68.49	x	68.10	68.97	66.33	x	68.97	
2nd place, silver medalist(s)	Gerd Kanter	Estonia	62.79	66.95	66.13	66.90	x	65.83	66.95	
3rd place, bronze medalist(s)	Ehsan Haddadi	Iran	65.29	64.07	x	x	65.50	66.08	66.08	SB
4	Märt Israel	Estonia	61.87	63.60	64.31	63.73	65.20	x	65.20	
5	Benn Harradine	Australia	64.43	64.02	62.08	x	64.18	64.77	64.77	
6	Virgilijus Alekna	Lithuania	62.75	x	64.09	62.62	x	61.25	64.09	
7	Vikas Gowda	India	60.79	61.51	64.05	62.81	62.16	62.16	64.05	
8	Jorge Fernández	Cuba	61.05	63.54	63.10	x	60.11	61.77	63.54	
9	Piotr Małachowski	Poland	58.28	x	63.37				63.37	
10	Jason Young	United States	62.54	x	63.20				63.20	
11	Mario Pestano	Spain	62.97	63.00	62.74				63.00	
12	Brett Morse	Great Britain & N.I.	60.84	62.69	57.87				62.69	
