= Iran at the 2015 World Championships in Athletics =

- WA code: IRI

in Beijing
- Competitors: 6 in 5 event
- Medals: Gold 0 Silver 0 Bronze 0 Total 0

World Championships in Athletics appearances
- 1983; 1987; 1991; 1993; 1995; 1997; 1999; 2001; 2003; 2005; 2007; 2009; 2011; 2013; 2015; 2017; 2019; 2022; 2023; 2025

Iran competed at the 2015 World Championships in Athletics in Beijing, China, from 22 to 30 August 2015.

== Results ==
(q – qualified, NM – no mark, SB – season best)

=== Men ===
Track and road events

Athlete	Event	Heat		Semifinal		Final	
Athlete	Event	Result	Rank	Result	Rank	Result	Rank
Hassan Taftian	100 metres	10.10	4 q	10.20	7	Did not advance	
Reza Ghasemi	100 metres	10.25	6	Did not advance			
Mohammad Hossein Abareghi	200 metres	DNS		Did not advance			
Mohammad Jafar Moradi	Marathon	—				DNF	

Field events

Athlete	Event	Qualification		Final	
Athlete	Event	Result	Rank	Result	Rank
Ehsan Haddadi	Discus throw	60.39	24	Did not advance	

=== Women ===
Field events

Athlete	Event	Qualification		Final	
Athlete	Event	Result	Rank	Result	Rank
Leila Rajabi	Shot put	17.04	18	Did not advance	
