= 2011 World Championships in Athletics – Women's triple jump =

Women's Triple Jump event at the 2011 World Championships, Daegu, South Korea

Official Video

The Women's triple jump event at the 2011 World Championships in Athletics was held at the Daegu Stadium on August 30 and September 1.

Yargelis Savigne of Cuba had won the last two world titles (2007 and 2009) and led the world rankings before the competition with a jump of 14.99 m. She and Ukrainian Olha Saladuha each had three wins on the Diamond League before the event. Colombia's Caterine Ibargüen was joint number one in the rankings, having set a South American record two weeks earlier. Olga Rypakova, who was dominant in 2010, had the fourth best jump among the entrants with her mark of 14.96 m. Paraskeví Papahrístou, the 2009 runner-up Mabel Gay, and Josleidy Ribalta were the other top-eight ranked athletes to start.

Saladukha popped 14.94 on the third jump of the competition. Nobody, including Saladukha herself was able to improve upon that through the six rounds. Defending champion Savigne hurt herself on her second attempt and was not a factor. Gay made her personal best jump in the fifth round to move into a tie for third. Ibargüen followed her with her best attempt to move into second place. Rypakova then followed her with the silver medal winning jump, pushing Ibargüen to third.

== Medalists ==
Gold	Silver	Bronze
Olha Saladukha; Ukraine	Olga Rypakova; Kazakhstan	Caterine Ibargüen; Colombia

== Records ==
Prior to the competition, the established records were as follows.

World record	Inessa Kravets (UKR)	15.50	Gothenburg, Sweden	10 August 1995
Championship record	Inessa Kravets (UKR)	15.50	Göteborg, Sweden	10 August 1995
World leading	Yargelis Savigne (CUB)	14.99	Paris, France	8 July 2011
World leading	Caterine Ibargüen (COL)	14.99	Bogotá, Colombia	13 August 2011
African record	Françoise Mbango Etone (CMR)	15.39	Beijing, China	17 August 2008
Asian record	Olga Rypakova (KAZ)	15.25	Split, Croatia	4 September 2010
North, Central American and Caribbean record	Yamilé Aldama (CUB)	15.29	Rome, Italy	11 July 2003
South American record	Caterine Ibargüen (COL)	14.99	Bogotá, Colombia	13 August 2011
European record	Inessa Kravets (UKR)	15.50	Göteborg, Sweden	10 August 1995
Oceanian record	Nicole Mladenis (AUS)	14.04	Hobart, Australia	9 March 2002
Oceanian record	Nicole Mladenis (AUS)	14.04	Perth, Australia	7 December 2003

== Qualification standards ==
A standard	B standard
14.30	14.10

== Schedule ==
Date	Time	Round
August 30, 2011	11:45	Qualification
September 1, 2011	19:20	Final

== Results ==
=== Qualification ===
Qualification: Qualifying Performance 14.45 (Q) or at least 12 best performers (q) advance to the final.

Rank	Group	Athlete	Nationality	#1	#2	#3	Result	Notes
1	B	Yargelis Savigne	Cuba	14.32	14.40	14.62	14.62	Q
2	A	Mabel Gay	Cuba	14.21	14.53		14.53	Q
3	A	Caterine Ibargüen	Colombia	14.52			14.52	Q
4	A	Olha Saladukha	Ukraine	14.40	14.36	14.35	14.40	q
5	B	Yamilé Aldama	Great Britain & N.I.	14.35	14.20	x	14.35	q, SB
6	B	Olga Rypakova	Kazakhstan	x	14.33	x	14.33	q
7	A	Anna Kuropatkina	Russia	14.05	x	14.31	14.31	q
8	B	Baya Rahouli	Algeria	14.30	13.95	x	14.30	q
9	B	Dana Velďáková	Slovakia	x	14.28	x	14.28	q
10	A	Natalia Iastrebova	Ukraine	13.94	14.07	14.21	14.21	q
11	B	Biljana Topić	Serbia	14.03	13.93	14.21	14.21	q, SB
12	A	Keila Costa	Brazil	13.50	14.02	14.15	14.15	q
13	A	Yarianna Martínez	Cuba	14.07	13.92	x	14.07	
14	B	Kimberly Williams	Jamaica	13.10	14.06	14.03	14.06	
15	A	Simona La Mantia	Italy	14.06	x	x	14.06	
16	B	Paraskevi Papahristou	Greece	13.71	14.05	x	14.05	
17	A	Irina Litvinenko Ektova	Kazakhstan	13.66	13.57	14.01	14.01	
18	B	Anastasiya Juravleva	Uzbekistan	14.00	13.82	13.79	14.00	
19	A	Mayookha Johny	India	13.64	13.99	13.79	13.99	
20	A	Níki Panéta	Greece	12.87	13.75	13.97	13.97	
21	A	Marija Šestak	Slovenia	x	13.87	x	13.87	
22	A	Valeriya Kanatova	Uzbekistan	13.86	13.72	13.75	13.86	
23	B	Dailenys Alcántara	Cuba	13.66	13.78	x	13.78	
24	B	Aleksandra Kotlyarova	Uzbekistan	13.49	13.78	x	13.78	
25	B	Xie Limei	China	13.55	13.74	13.75	13.75	
26	B	Andriyana Bânova	Bulgaria	13.34	13.63	13.66	13.66	
27	A	Patrícia Mamona	Portugal	13.48	13.27	13.59	13.59	
28	B	Anna Jagaciak	Poland	13.57	13.57	x	13.57	
29	A	Li Yanmei	China	x	x	13.52	13.52	
30	A	Jung Hye-Kyung	South Korea	x	11.35	13.50	13.50	
31	A	Amanda Smock	United States	x	13.48	13.37	13.48	
32	B	Ruslana Tsykhotska	Ukraine	x	x	13.28	13.28	
33	B	Sarah Nambawa	Uganda	11.65	13.22	13.19	13.22	
34	B	Patricia Sarrapio	Spain	x	13.11	13.12	13.12	

=== Final ===
Rank	Athlete	Nationality	#1	#2	#3	#4	#5	#6	Result	Notes
1st place, gold medalist(s)	Olha Saladukha	Ukraine	14.94	13.64	14.68	14.65	14.22	14.48	14.94	
2nd place, silver medalist(s)	Olga Rypakova	Kazakhstan	x	14.72	x	x	14.89	14.54	14.89	
3rd place, bronze medalist(s)	Caterine Ibargüen	Colombia	14.64	14.67	13.76	14.81	14.84	14.80	14.84	
4	Mabel Gay	Cuba	14.45	14.31	x	14.53	14.67	14.18	14.67	PB
5	Yamilé Aldama	Great Britain & N.I.	14.50	x	x	x	x	14.33	14.50	SB
6	Yargelis Savigne	Cuba	14.43	x	x	–	–	–	14.43	
7	Anna Kuropatkina	Russia	13.89	14.23	x	14.09	x	14.06	14.23	
8	Baya Rahouli	Algeria	13.95	13.79	14.12	x	14.03	13.97	14.12	
9	Natalia Iastrebova	Ukraine	13.34	13.89	14.12				14.12	
10	Biljana Topić	Serbia	14.03	13.84	x				14.03	
11	Dana Velďáková	Slovakia	13.96	x	x				13.96	
12	Keila Costa	Brazil	13.71	x	13.72				13.72	
