= Iran at the 2011 World Championships in Athletics =

- WA code: IRI
- National federation: Amateur Athletic Federation of Islamic Republic of Iran
- Website: www.athletic.ir

in Daegu
- Competitors: 7
- Medals: Gold 0 Silver 0 Bronze 1 Total 1

World Championships in Athletics appearances
- 1983; 1987; 1991; 1993; 1995; 1997; 1999; 2001; 2003; 2005; 2007; 2009; 2011; 2013; 2015; 2017; 2019; 2022; 2023

The Islamic Republic of Iran competed at the 2011 World Championships in Athletics from August 27 to September 4 in Daegu, South Korea.

== Team selection ==
A team of 7 athletes was announced to represent the country in the event.

== Medalists ==
The following competitor from the Islamic Republic of Iran won a medal at the Championships

Medal	Athlete	Event
Bronze	Ehsan Hadadi	Discus throw

== Results ==
=== Men ===
Athlete	Event	Preliminaries		Heats		Semifinals		Final	
Athlete	Event	Time Width Height	Rank	Time Width Height	Rank	Time Width Height	Rank	Time Width Height	Rank
Sajad Moradi	800 metres			1:46.39	11	1:46.17 SB	14	Did not advance	
Amin Nikfar	Shot put	19.18	24					Did not advance	
Ehsan Hadadi	Discus throw	65.21	2					66.08 SB	3rd place, bronze medalist(s)
Mohammad Samimi	Discus throw	61.10	23					Did not advance	
Kaveh Mosavi	Hammer throw	68.01	31					Did not advance	

Decathlon

Hadi Sepehrzad	Decathlon			
Hadi Sepehrzad	Event	Results	Points	Rank
	100 m	11.19 (SB)	819	22
	Long jump	6.65 (SB)	732	28
	Shot put	15.65	830	6
	High jump	1.90 (PB)	714	27
	400 m	50.92 (SB)	773	23
	110 m hurdles	14.95	856	25
	Discus throw	50.06	872	2
	Pole vault	NM	0	
	Javelin throw	DNS		
	1500 m			
Total			DNF	

=== Women ===
Athlete	Event	Preliminaries		Heats		Semifinals		Final	
Athlete	Event	Time Width Height	Rank	Time Width Height	Rank	Time Width Height	Rank	Time Width Height	Rank
Maryam Tousi	200 metres			24.17	33	Did not advance			
