= Iran at the 2013 World Championships in Athletics =

- WA code: IRI

in Moscow
- Competitors: 5
- Medals: Gold 0 Silver 0 Bronze 0 Total 0

World Championships in Athletics appearances
- 1983; 1987; 1991; 1993; 1995; 1997; 1999; 2001; 2003; 2005; 2007; 2009; 2011; 2013; 2015; 2017; 2019; 2022; 2023

Iran competed at the 2013 World Championships in Athletics from August 10 to August 18 in Moscow, Russia. A team of 5 athletes was announced to represent the country in the event.

== Results ==
(q – qualified, NM – no mark, SB – season best)

=== Men ===
==== Road and track events ====
Athlete	Event	Preliminaries		Heats		Semifinals		Final	
Athlete	Event	Time	Rank	Time	Rank	Time	Rank	Time	Rank
Reza Ghasemi	100 metres			10.46	41	did not advance			
Hassan Taftian	100 metres			10.57	48	did not advance			
Ebrahim Rahimian	Men's 20 kilometres walk	—						DQ	-

==== Field events ====
Athlete	Event	Preliminaries		Final	
Athlete	Event	Mark	Rank	Mark	Rank
Mahmoud Samimi	Dicus throw	57.77	28	did not advance	

=== Women ===
==== Field events ====
Athlete	Event	Preliminaries		Final	
Athlete	Event	Mark	Rank	Mark	Rank
Leila Rajabi	Shot put	DNS	-	did not advance	
