= Iran at the 2009 World Championships in Athletics =

- WA code: IRI
- National federation: AAFIRI
- Website: www.athletic.ir

in Berlin
- Competitors: 2 (1 man, 1 woman)
- Medals: Gold 0 Silver 0 Bronze 0 Total 0

World Championships in Athletics appearances
- 1983; 1987; 1991; 1993; 1995; 1997; 1999; 2001; 2003; 2005; 2007; 2009; 2011; 2013; 2015; 2017; 2019; 2022; 2023

Iran competes at the 2009 World Championships in Athletics from 15 to 23 August in Berlin.

== Team selection ==
Track and road events

| Event | Athletes | |
| Event | Men | Women |
|---|---|---|
| 800 metres | Sajjad Moradi | |

Field and combined events

| Event | Athletes | |
| Event | Men | Women |
|---|---|---|
| Shot Put | | Leila Rajabi |

=== Withdrawal ===
- Ehsan Haddadi
- Mahmoud Samimi
- Mohammad Samimi

== Results ==
=== Men ===
Track and road events

| Event | Athletes | Heat Round 1 | | Heat Round 2 | | Semifinal | | Final | |
| Event | Athletes | Result | Rank | Result | Rank | Result | Rank | Result | Rank |
|---|---|---|---|---|---|---|---|---|---|
| 800 m | Sajjad Moradi | 1:47.68 | 23 | | | did not advance | | | |

=== Women ===
Field and combined events

| Event | Athletes | Qualification | | Final | |
| Event | Athletes | Result | Rank | Result | Rank |
|---|---|---|---|---|---|
| Shot put | Leila Rajabi | 16.60 | 25 | did not advance | |
