= 2023 World Athletics Championships – Men's 10,000 metres =

Men's 10,000 metres at the 2023 World Championships
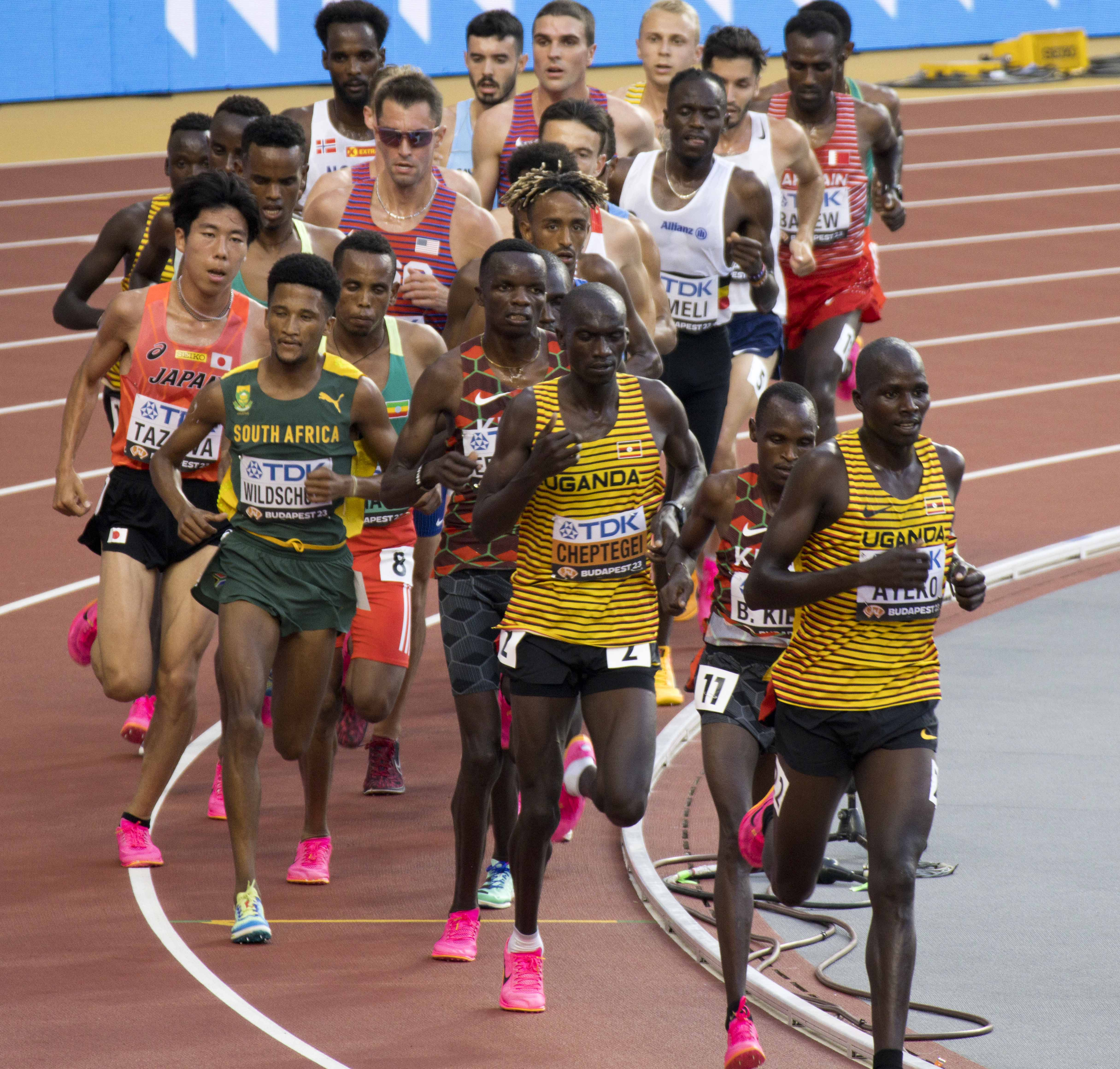
- Venue: National Athletics Centre
- Dates: 20 August
- Competitors: 25 from 18 nations
- Winning time: 27:51.42

Medalists
| gold medal | Joshua Cheptegei | Uganda |
| silver medal | Daniel Ebenyo | Kenya |
| bronze medal | Selemon Barega | Ethiopia |

The men's 10,000 metres at the 2023 World Athletics Championships was held at the National Athletics Centre Budapest on 20 August 2023

== Summary ==
At the start of this race, Joel Ayeko started off fast with a 62 second lap to take the lead. The rest of the field had no interest in running that fast this early. After that burst, Ayeko backed off to a more sensible 71 second pace. The peloton let Ayeko have his time on television for the first 3200 metres before Benard Kibet pulled him in. Ayeko kept the point position for another 800 metres before Kibet decided it was time to swallow him up, dropping the pace to 66 seconds. After at little more than a lap, Ayeko dropped out. Kibet and Berihu Aregawi kept the pace going. On the 16th lap, Olympic Champion Selemon Barega came from the back of the lead group to show his teammate Aregawi how fast he wanted the pace. Aregawi obliged and held the point. As the laps counted down, defending champion Joshua Cheptegei was watching from Aregawi's shoulder, Mohammed Ahmed pinned on the rail, with all three Kenyans and Barega watching on the back. With a lap and a half to go, Barega floated up to join his teammate but that just brought Cheptegei to the front to take the bell first. The pack strung out, with only the two Ethiopians and Daniel Ebenyo able to stay in contact, Ahmed struggling to stay in tow. With 200 to go, Aregawi showed his weakness and looked back, Ebenyo went around him. Barega stuck to Cheptegei all the way through the final turn, Cheptegei covering his last 400 metres in 52.77 and still hadn't broken Barega. Cheptegei looked back then pushed one more time, finally Barega couldn't keep up, Cheptegei separated for a clear 8 metre victory. Defeated, Barega continued on to the finish line, but Ebenyo didn't stop racing. Barega let up 5 metres before the finish line only to have Ebenyo cruise by on the inside for silver.

== Records ==
Before the competition records were as follows:

| Record | Athlete & Nat. | Perf. | Location | Date |
|---|---|---|---|---|
| World record | Joshua Cheptegei (UGA) | 26:11.00 | Valencia, Spain | 7 October 2020 |
| Championship record | Kenenisa Bekele (ETH) | 26:46.31 | Berlin, Germany | 17 August 2009 |
| World Leading | Berihu Aregawi (ETH) | 26:50.66 | Nerja, Spain | 23 June 2023 |
| African Record | Joshua Cheptegei (UGA) | 26:11.00 | Valencia, Spain | 7 October 2020 |
| Asian Record | Ahmad Hassan Abdullah (QAT) | 26:38.76 | Brussels, Belgium | 5 September 2003 |
| North, Central American and Caribbean record | Grant Fisher (USA) | 26:33.84 | San Juan Capistrano, United States | 6 March 2022 |
| South American Record | Marilson Gomes dos Santos (BRA) | 27:28.12 | Neerpelt, Belgium | 2 June 2007 |
| European Record | Mo Farah (GBR) | 26:46.57 | Eugene, United States | 3 June 2011 |
| Oceanian record | Jack Rayner (AUS) | 27:15.35 | San Juan Capistrano, United States | 6 March 2022 |

== Qualification standard ==
The standard to qualify automatically for entry was 27:10.00.

== Schedule ==
The event schedule, in local time (CEST), was as follows:

| Date | Time | Round |
|---|---|---|
| 20 August | 18:25 | Final |

== Results ==
=== Final ===
The final was started at 18:26.

| Rank | Name | Nationality | Time | Notes |
|---|---|---|---|---|
| 1st place, gold medalist(s) | Joshua Cheptegei | Uganda | 27:51.42 | SB |
| 2nd place, silver medalist(s) | Daniel Ebenyo | Kenya | 27:52.60 | |
| 3rd place, bronze medalist(s) | Selemon Barega | Ethiopia | 27:52.72 | |
| 4 | Berihu Aregawi | Ethiopia | 27:55.71 | |
| 5 | Benard Kibet | Kenya | 27:56.27 | |
| 6 | Mohammed Ahmed | Canada | 27:56.43 | SB |
| 7 | Rodrigue Kwizera | Burundi | 28:00.29 | SB |
| 8 | Nicholas Kimeli | Kenya | 28:03.38 | |
| 9 | Yann Schrub | France | 28:07.42 | SB |
| 10 | Birhanu Balew | Bahrain | 28:08.03 | SB |
| 11 | Woody Kincaid | United States | 28:08.71 | |
| 12 | Yemaneberhan Crippa | Italy | 28:16.40 | |
| 13 | Isaac Kimeli | Belgium | 28:20.77 | SB |
| 14 | Adriaan Wildschutt | South Africa | 28:21.40 | |
| 15 | Ren Tazawa | Japan | 28:25.85 | |
| 16 | Sean McGorty | United States | 28:27.54 | |
| 17 | Santiago Catrofe | Uruguay | 28:28.49 | NR |
| 18 | Zerei Kbrom Mezngi | Norway | 28:30.76 | |
| 19 | Merhawi Mebrahtu | Eritrea | 28:50.62 | |
| 20 | Joe Klecker | United States | 29:03.41 | |
| 21 | Nils Voigt | Germany | 29:06.79 | |
| 22 | Rogers Kibet | Uganda | 29:10.07 | |
| | Joel Ayeko | Uganda | DNF | |
| | Carlos Díaz | Chile | DNF | |
| | Yismaw Dillu | Ethiopia | DNF | |
