= 2023 World Athletics Championships – Women's 10,000 metres =

Women's 10,000 metres at the 2023 World Championships
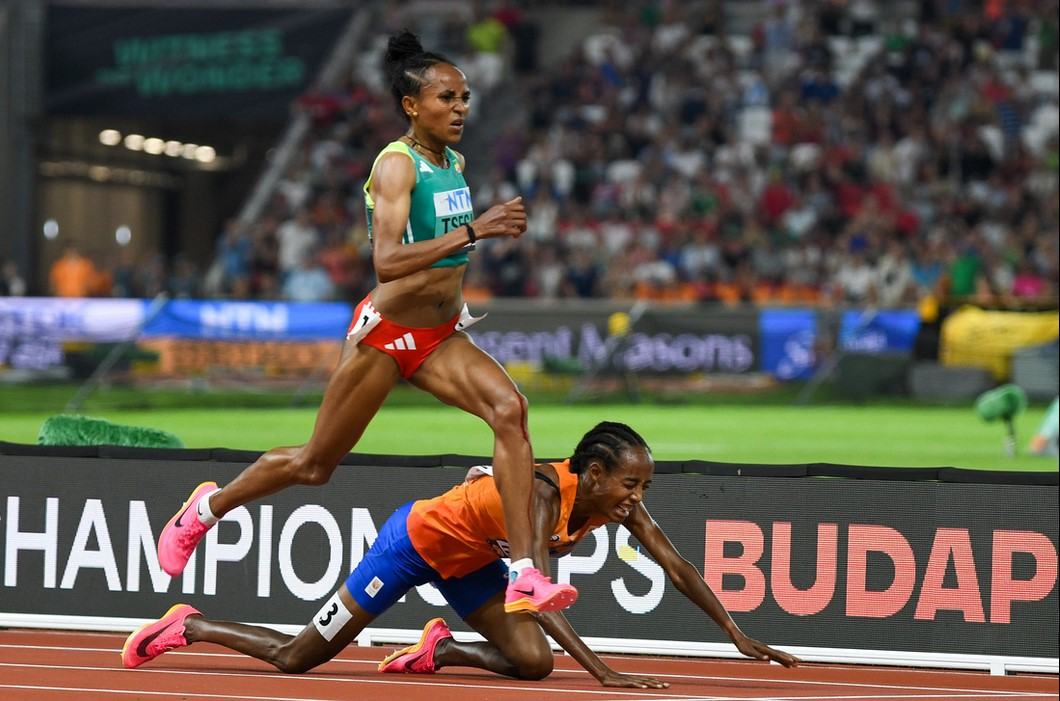
- Gudaf Tsegay and Sifan Hassan competing. Hassan stumbled just a few metres before the finish line.
- Venue: National Athletics Centre
- Dates: 19 August
- Competitors: 22 from 12 nations
- Winning time: 31:27.18

Medalists
gold medal	Gudaf Tsegay	Ethiopia
silver medal	Letesenbet Gidey	Ethiopia
bronze medal	Ejgayehu Taye	Ethiopia

The women's 10,000 metres at the 2023 World Athletics Championships was held at the National Athletics Centre Budapest on 19 August 2023

== Summary ==
On social media, Sifan Hassan posted the answer to the obvious question; Why is she attempting the triple?

“I want to see if I can do it again, because the challenge of running three distances fuels me.”

Day one was the first step. At 1:15 p.m., Hassan's first heat of the 1500 was scheduled. That race was postponed an hour, shortening her rest time before this race, scheduled at 8:55 p.m. Meanwhile, her competitors were rested and focused on this one race, anticipating Hassan's kick as a factor they needed to beat. Defending champion Letesenbet Gidey succeeded last year, winning by hundredths of a second as all the medalists held off Hassan.

The race started off slowly, Natosha Rogers relegated to the lead for three laps before handing the duty off to Camilla Richardsson who held it for the next eleven laps. Hassan took an even slower approach, dropping to dead last.

With eleven laps to go, Agnes Jebet Ngetich led the Kenyan team to the front, with the Ethiopian contingent marking the move, then Gudaf Tsegay took them forward. As the pace quickened, slower athletes fell off the pace, but Hassan was always at the back of the group still in contact with the lead. Gidey took her turn in the lead, then Ejgayehu Taye took them to three laps to go. Grace Nawowuna burned the next lap breaking the lead group down to ten. The Ethiopians asserted themselves into Tsegay and Gidey leading most of the penultimate lap. They continued to accelerate through the bell, with Hassan running around the field from tenth to first during the penultimate turn. Down the backstretch and through the final turn only the Ethiopians were able to chase. Hassan looked back to see she had the edge on Gidey but Tsegay would not go away. Hassan had a one-metre lead at the start of the home stretch, but Tsegay kept edging closer. Hassan drifted out into lane 2, making Tsegay's path longer, suddenly, 20 metres from home, Hassan's legs went out from under her and she fell to the track. Tsegay continued on to victory. 7 metres back, Gidey held off Taye to complete the medals and a sweep for Ethiopia. Hassan got up and walked on to the finish. Gidey walked back to give her a high five and a hug as she crossed the finish in eleventh place.

== Records ==
Before the competition records were as follows:

Record	Athlete & Nat.	Perf.	Location	Date
World record	Letesenbet Gidey (ETH)	29:01.03	Hengelo, Netherlands	8 June 2021
Championship record	Berhane Adere (ETH)	30:04.18	Saint-Denis, France	23 August 2003
World Leading	Gudaf Tsegay (ETH)	29:29.73	Nerja, Spain	23 June 2023
African Record	Letesenbet Gidey (ETH)	29:01.03	Hengelo, Netherlands	8 June 2021
Asian Record	Wang Junxia (CHN)	29:31.78	Beijing, China	8 September 1993
North, Central American and Caribbean record	Alicia Monson (USA)	30:03.82	San Juan Capistrano, United States	4 March 2023
South American Record	Carmen de Oliveira (BRA)	31:47.76	Stuttgart, Germany	21 August 1993
European Record	Sifan Hassan (NED)	29:06.82	Hengelo, Netherlands	6 June 2021
Oceanian record	Kimberley Smith (NZL)	30:35.54	Palo Alto, United States	4 May 2008

== Qualification standard ==
The standard to qualify automatically for entry was 30:40.00.

== Schedule ==
The event schedule, in local time (CEST), was as follows:

Date	Time	Round
19 August	20:55	Final

== Results ==
The final was started on 19 August at 20:59.

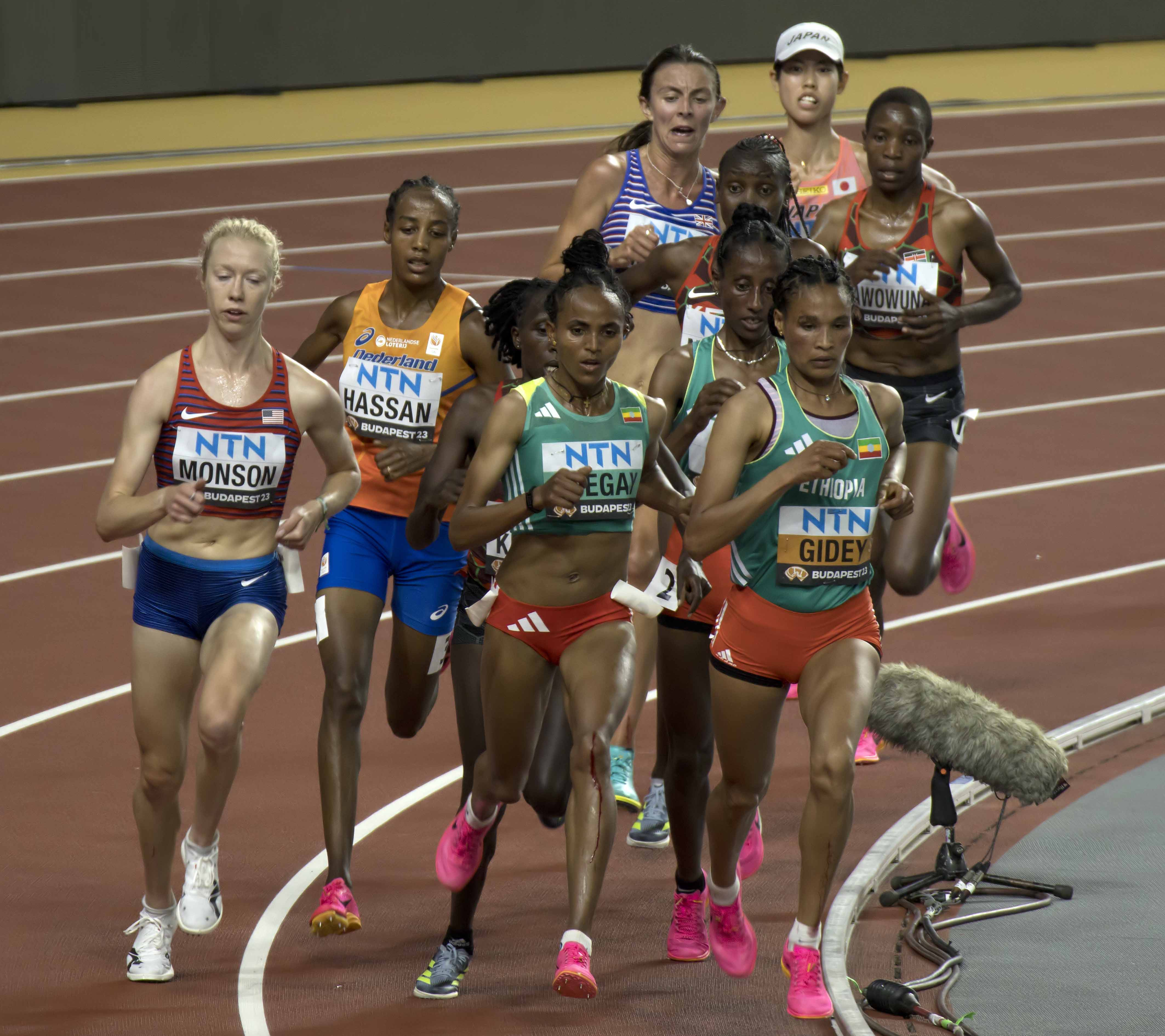
The race underway

Rank	Name	Nationality	Time	Notes
1st place, gold medalist(s)	Gudaf Tsegay	Ethiopia	31:27.18	
2nd place, silver medalist(s)	Letesenbet Gidey	Ethiopia	31:28.16	SB
3rd place, bronze medalist(s)	Ejgayehu Taye	Ethiopia	31:28.31	
4	Irine Jepchumba Kimais	Kenya	31:32.19	SB
5	Alicia Monson	United States	31:32.29	
6	Agnes Jebet Ngetich	Kenya	31:34.83	PB
7	Ririka Hironaka	Japan	31:35.12	SB
8	Jessica Warner-Judd	Great Britain & N.I.	31:35.38	
9	Grace Nawowuna	Kenya	31:38.17	
10	Sarah Chelangat	Uganda	31:40.04	SB
11	Sifan Hassan	Netherlands	31:53.35	
12	Elise Cranny	United States	31:57.51	SB
13	Diane van Es	Netherlands	32:05.85	
14	Natosha Rogers	United States	32:08.05	
15	Camilla Richardsson	Finland	32:15.74	
16	Stella Chesang	Uganda	32:38.90	SB
17	Lemlem Hailu	Ethiopia	32:42.78	
18	Sarah Lahti	Sweden	33:09.22	SB
19	Luz Mery Rojas	Peru	33:19.61	
20	Rino Goshima	Japan	33:20.38	
21	Maria Lucineida da Silva	Brazil	35:54.18	
	Caroline Chepkoech Kipkirui	Kazakhstan	DNF	
