= 2023 World Athletics Championships – Women's marathon =

Women's marathon at the 2023 World Championships
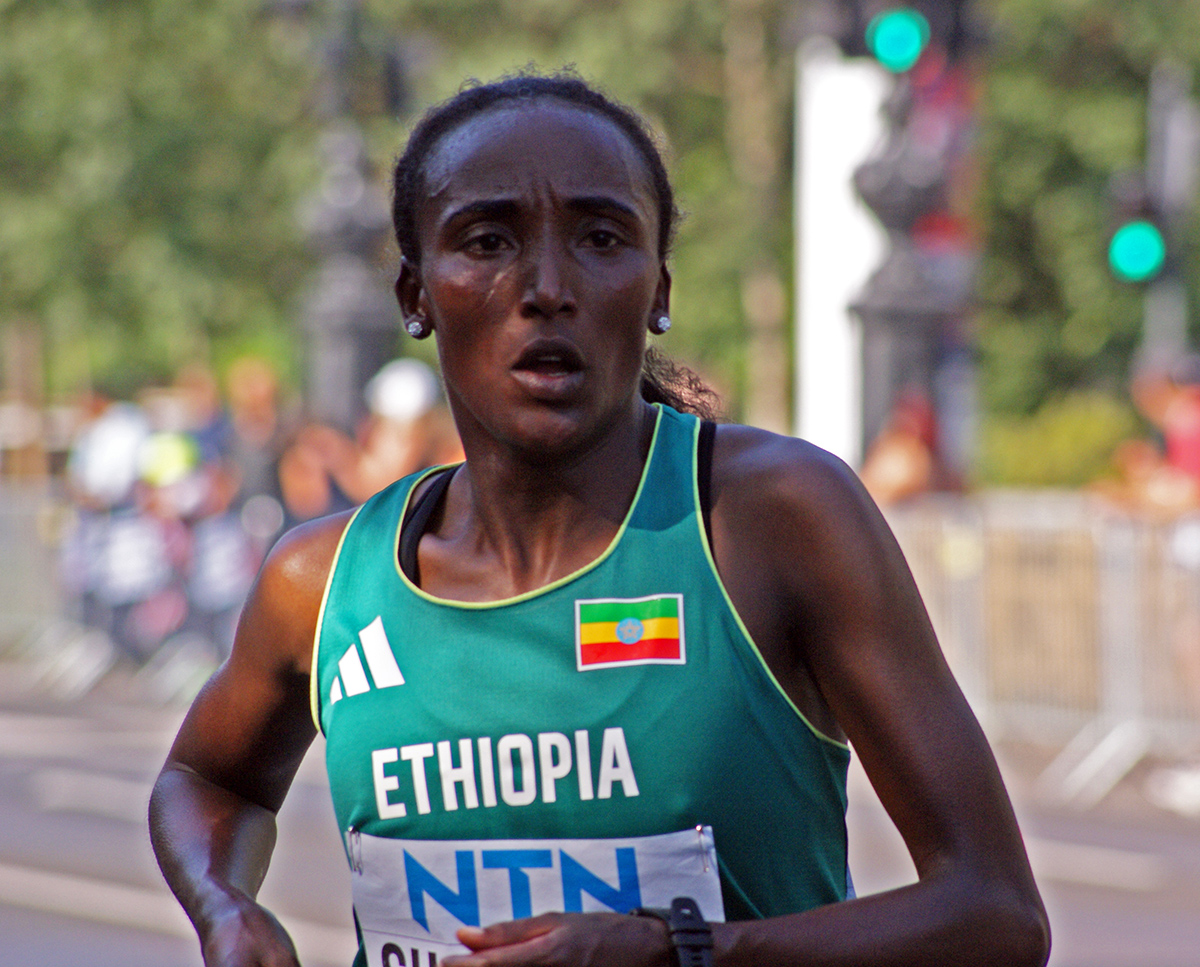
- Amane Beriso Shankule during the race
- Venue: National Athletics Centre
- Dates: 26 August
- Competitors: 78 from 47 nations
- Winning time: 2:24:23

Medalists
gold medal	Amane Beriso Shankule	Ethiopia
silver medal	Gotytom Gebreslase	Ethiopia
bronze medal	Fatima Ezzahra Gardadi	Morocco

The women's marathon at the 2023 World Athletics Championships was held in Budapest on 26 August 2023.

== Records ==
Before the competition records were as follows:

Record	Athlete & Nat.	Perf.	Location	Date
World record	Brigid Kosgei (KEN)	2:14:04	Chicago, United States	13 October 2019
Championship record	Gotytom Gebreslase (ETH)	2:18:11	Eugene, United States	18 July 2022
World Leading	Rosemary Wanjiru (KEN)	2:16:28	Tokyo, Japan	5 March 2023
African Record	Brigid Kosgei (KEN)	2:14:04	Chicago, United States	13 October 2019
Asian Record	Mizuki Noguchi (JPN)	2:19:12	Berlin, Germany	25 September 2005
North, Central American and Caribbean record	Emily Sisson (USA)	2:18:29	Chicago, United States	09 October 2022
South American Record	Gladys Tejeda (PER)	2:25:57	Seville, Spain	20 February 2022
European Record	Paula Radcliffe (GBR)	2:15:25	London, United Kingdom	13 April 2003
Oceanian record	Sinead Diver (AUS)	2:21:34	Valencia, Spain	04 December 2022

== Qualification standard ==
The standard to qualify automatically for entry was 2:28:00.

== Schedule ==
The event schedule, in local time (UTC+2), was as follows:

Date	Time	Round
26 August	07:00	Final

== Results ==
The final was started on 26 August at 06:59.

Rank	Name	Nation	Time	Note
1st place, gold medalist(s)	Amane Beriso Shankule	Ethiopia	2:24:23	SB
2nd place, silver medalist(s)	Gotytom Gebreslase	Ethiopia	2:24:34	SB
3rd place, bronze medalist(s)	Fatima Ezzahra Gardadi	Morocco	2:25:17	
4	Lonah Chemtai Salpeter	Israel	2:25:38	SB
5	Yalemzerf Yehualaw	Ethiopia	2:26:13	
6	Rosemary Wanjiru	Kenya	2:26:42	
7	Selly Chepyego Kaptich	Kenya	2:27:09	
8	Nazret Weldu	Eritrea	2:27:23	SB
9	Lindsay Flanagan	United States	2:27:47	
10	Dolshi Tesfu	Eritrea	2:28:54	
11	Melat Yisak Kejeta	Germany	2:29:04	
12	Giovanna Epis	Italy	2:29:10	
13	Mizuki Matsuda	Japan	2:29:15	
14	Rebecca Cheptegei	Uganda	2:29:34	SB
15	Natasha Wodak	Canada	2:30:09	SB
16	Lisa Jane Weightman	Australia	2:30:50	
17	Keira D'Amato	United States	2:31:35	SB
18	Mercyline Chelangat	Uganda	2:31:40	
19	Rika Kaseda	Japan	2:31:53	SB
20	Sayaka Sato	Japan	2:31:57	SB
21	Doreen Chesang	Uganda	2:32:11	
22	Alisa Vainio	Finland	2:32:14	
23	Ümmü Kiraz	Turkey	2:33:23	PB
24	Nóra Szabó	Hungary	2:33:28	
25	Rkia El Moukim	Morocco	2:33:54	
26	Moira Stewartová	Czech Republic	2:34:02	
27	Meritxell Soler	Spain	2:34:38	
28	Gulshanoi Satarova	Kyrgyzstan	2:35:06	SB
29	Silvia Ortiz	Ecuador	2:35:09	
30	Natasha Cockram	Great Britain & N.I.	2:35:34	SB
31	Galbadrakhyn Khishigsaikhan	Mongolia	2:35:38	SB
32	Li Zhixuan	China	2:35:48	
33	Bojana Bjeljac	Croatia	2:35:49	SB
34	Citlali Cristian Moscote	Mexico	2:36:03	
35	Zaida Ramos	Peru	2:36:23	
36	Militsa Mircheva	Bulgaria	2:36:45	SB
37	Clementine Mukandanga	Rwanda	2:37:09	SB
38	Marta Galimany	Spain	2:37:10	SB
39	Hanne Verbruggen	Belgium	2:37:15	
40	Monika Jackiewicz	Poland	2:37:18	
41	Sarah Klein	Australia	2:37:31	
42	Mokulubete Blandina Makatisi	Lesotho	2:37:49	SB
43	Isobel Batt-Doyle	Australia	2:37:53	
44	Risper Biyaki	Mexico	2:38:29	
45	Irvette van Zyl	South Africa	2:38:32	SB
46	Loreta Kančytė	Lithuania	2:38:52	
47	Valdilene dos Santos Silva	Brazil	2:39:58	
48	Zhang Deshun	China	2:40:17	
49	Alina Armas	Namibia	2:40:49	SB
50	Julia Mayer	Austria	2:41:54	
51	Rosa Chacha	Ecuador	2:42:00	
52	Andreia Hessel	Brazil	2:42:23	SB
53	Nicolasa Condori	Peru	2:42:25	
54	Nina Chydenius	Finland	2:42:36	
55	Fortunate Chidzivo	Zimbabwe	2:43:28	
56	Argentina Valdepeñas Cerna	Mexico	2:43:35	
57	Katalin Kovács-Garami	Hungary	2:44:02	
58	Susanna Sullivan	United States	2:44:24	
59	Karen Ehrenreich	Denmark	2:44:46	
60	Solange Jesus	Portugal	2:45:08	
61	Sasha Gollish	Canada	2:45:09	SB
62	Aydee Loayza Huaman	Peru	2:45:40	
63	Neja Kršinar	Slovenia	2:46:55	SB
64	Mirela Saturnino De Andrade	Brazil	2:47:29	
65	Tsao Chun-yu	Chinese Taipei	2:55:33	
	Amina Bettiche	Algeria	DNF	
	Cavaline Nahimana	Burundi	DNF	
	Rose Chelimo	Bahrain	DNF	
	Andrea Paola Bonilla	Ecuador	DNF	
	Fatima Azzahraa Ouhaddou Nafie	Spain	DNF	
	Tsehay Gemechu	Ethiopia	DNF	
	Zhanna Mamazhanova	Kazakhstan	DNF	
	Shyline Jepkorir Toroitich	Kenya	DNF	
	Adrijana Pop Arsova	North Macedonia	DNF	
	Aleksandra Lisowska	Poland	DNF	
	Beverly Ramos	Puerto Rico	DNF	
	Yayla Gönen	Turkey	DNF	
	Alia Saeed Mohammed	United Arab Emirates	DNS	
