= Uganda at the 2023 World Athletics Championships =

- WA code: UGA

in Budapest, Hungary 19 August 2023 – 27 August 2023
- Competitors: 21 (12 men and 9 women)
- Medals Ranked 11th: Gold 2 Silver 0 Bronze 0 Total 2

World Athletics Championships appearances
- 1983; 1987; 1991; 1993; 1995; 1997; 1999; 2001; 2003; 2005; 2007; 2009; 2011; 2013; 2015; 2017; 2019; 2022; 2023

Uganda competed at the 2023 World Athletics Championships in Budapest, Hungary, from 19 to 27 August 2023.

== Medalists ==
Medal	Athlete	Event	Date
Gold	Joshua Cheptegei	Men's 10,000 metres	August 20
Gold	Victor Kiplangat	Men's marathon	August 27

== Results ==
Key

- Q = Qualified for the next round
- q = Qualified for the next round as a fastest loser or, in field events, by position without achieving the qualifying target
- NR = National record
- PB = Personal best
- SB = Season best
- NM = No mark
- N/A = Round not applicable for the event

=== Men ===
Track and road events

Athlete	Event	Heat		Semifinal		Final	
Athlete	Event	Result	Rank	Result	Rank	Result	Rank
Tarsis Orogot	200 metres	20.44	4 q	20.26	3	Did not advance	
Tom Dradriga	800 metres	1:48.60	7	Did not advance			
Abu Mayanja	1500 metres	3:38.15	12	Did not advance			
Oscar Chelimo	5000 metres	13:33.40 SB	5 Q	—		DNF	
Joshua Cheptegei	5000 metres	DNS		—		Did not advance	
Joel Ayeko	10,000 metres	—				DNF	
Joshua Cheptegei	10,000 metres	—				27:51.42 SB	1st place, gold medalist(s)
Rogers Kibet	10,000 metres	—				29:10.07	22
Victor Kiplangat	Marathon	—				2:08:53	1st place, gold medalist(s)
Stephen Kissa	Marathon	—				2:10:22	5
Andrew Rotich Kwemoi	Marathon	—				DNF	
Leonard Chemutai	3000 metres steeplechase	8:24.74	5 Q	—		8:21.61	12

=== Women ===
Track and road events

Athlete	Event	Heat		Semifinal		Final	
Athlete	Event	Result	Rank	Result	Rank	Result	Rank
Halimah Nakaayi	800 metres	1:59.68	1 Q	1:58.89	3 q	1:59.18	8
Winnie Nanyondo	1500 metres	4:10.55	12	Did not advance			
Sarah Chelangat	5000 metres	15:14.89	13	—		Did not advance	
Prisca Chesang	5000 metres	15:37.02	16	—		Did not advance	
Sarah Chelangat	10,000 metres	—				31:40.04 SB	10
Stella Chesang	10,000 metres	—				32:38.90 SB	16
Mercyline Chelangat	Marathon	—				2:31:40	18
Rebecca Cheptegei	Marathon	—				2:29:34 SB	14
Doreen Chesang	Marathon	—				2:32:11	21
Peruth Chemutai	3000 metres steeplechase	9:20.03	3 Q	—		9:10.26 PB	7
