= Ethiopia at the 2023 World Athletics Championships =

- Flag of Ethiopia
- WA code: ETH

in Budapest, Hungary 19 August 2023 – 27 August 2023
- Competitors: 42 (20 men and 22 women)
- Medals Ranked 6th: Gold 2 Silver 4 Bronze 3 Total 9

World Athletics Championships appearances
- 1983; 1987; 1991; 1993; 1995; 1997; 1999; 2001; 2003; 2005; 2007; 2009; 2011; 2013; 2015; 2017; 2019; 2022; 2023

Ethiopia competed at the 2023 World Athletics Championships in Budapest, Hungary, from 19 to 27 August 2023.

== Medallists ==
Medal	Name	Event	Date
Gold	Gudaf Tsegay	Women's 10,000 metres	19 August
Gold	Amane Beriso Shankule	Women's marathon	26 August
Silver	Letesenbet Gidey	Women's 10,000 metres	19 August
Silver	Diribe Welteji	Women’s 1500 metres	22 August
Silver	Lamecha Girma	Men’s 3000 metres steeplechase	22 August
Silver	Gotytom Gebreslase	Women's marathon	26 August
Bronze	Ejgayehu Taye	Women's 10,000 metres	19 August
Bronze	Selemon Barega	Men's 10,000 metres	20 August
Bronze	Leul Gebresilase	Men's marathon	27 August

== Results ==
Ethiopia entered 42 athletes (with reserves).

Key

- Q = Qualified for the next round
- q = Qualified for the next round as a fastest loser or, in field events, by position without achieving the qualifying target
- NR = National record
- PB = Personal best
- SB = Season best
- NM = No mark
- N/A = Round not applicable for the event

=== Men ===
==== Track and road events ====
Athlete	Event	Heat		Semifinal		Final	
Athlete	Event	Result	Rank	Result	Rank	Result	Rank
Adisu Girma	1500 metres	3:45.86	14	Did not advance			
Teddese Lemi	1500 metres	3:47.49	11	Did not advance			
Samuel Abate	1500 metres	3:36.57	8	Did not advance			
Berihu Aregawi	5000 metres	13:33.23	4 Q	—		13:12.99	8
Hagos Gebrhiwet	5000 metres	13:36.15	2 Q	—		13:12.65	6
Yomif Kejelcha	5000 metres	13:32.83	2 Q	—		13:12.51	5
Berihu Aregawi	10,000 metres	—				27:55.71	4
Selemon Barega	10,000 metres	—				27:52.72	3rd place, bronze medalist(s)
Yismaw Dillu	10,000 metres	—				DNF	
Leul Gebresilase	Marathon	—				2:09:19	3rd place, bronze medalist(s)
Tsegaye Getachew	Marathon	—				2:11:56	17
Milkesa Mengesha	Marathon	—				2:10:43	6
Tamirat Tola	Marathon	—				DNF	
Lamecha Girma	3000 metres steeplechase	8:15.89	1 Q	—		8:05.44	2nd place, silver medalist(s)
Abrham Sime	3000 metres steeplechase	8:31.49	8	—		Did not advance	
Getnet Wale	3000 metres steeplechase	8:19.99	1 Q	—		8:21.03	11

=== Women ===
Track and road events

Athlete	Event	Heat		Semifinal		Final	
Athlete	Event	Result	Rank	Result	Rank	Result	Rank
Habitam Alemu	800 metres	1:59.36	1 Q	2:01.02	4	Did not advance	
Tigist Girma	800 metres	2:01.47	6	Did not advance			
Worknesh Mesele	800 metres	2:00.13	3 Q	1:59.54	4	Did not advance	
Birke Haylom	1500 metres	4:01.12	3 Q	4:02.46	2 Q	4:01.51	9
Hirut Meshesha	1500 metres	4:03.47	1 Q	4:04.27	9	Did not advance	
Diribe Welteji	1500 metres	4:02.72	2 Q	3:55.18	2 Q	3:55.69	2nd place, silver medalist(s)
Medina Eisa	5000 metres	15:03.07	6 Q	—		14:58.23	6
Freweyni Hailu	5000 metres	14:34.16	4 Q	—		14:58.31	7
Ejgayehu Taye	5000 metres	14:33.23	3 Q	—		14:56.85	5
Gudaf Tsegay	5000 metres	14:57.72	2 Q	—		15:01.13	13
Letesenbet Gidey	10,000 metres	—				31:28.16 SB	2nd place, silver medalist(s)
Lemlem Hailu	10,000 metres	—				32:42.78	17
Ejgayehu Taye	10,000 metres	—				31:28.31	3rd place, bronze medalist(s)
Gudaf Tsegay	10,000 metres	—				31:27.18	1st place, gold medalist(s)
Gotytom Gebreslase	Marathon	—				2:24:34 SB	2nd place, silver medalist(s)
Tsehay Gemechu	Marathon	—				DNF	
Amane Beriso	Marathon	—				2:24:23 SB	1st place, gold medalist(s)
Yalemzerf Yehualaw	Marathon	—				2:26:13	5
Sembo Almayew	3000 metres steeplechase	9:19.60	2 Q	—		9:18.25	13
Lomi Muleta	3000 metres steeplechase	9:20.13	3 Q	—		9:15.36	12
Zerfe Wondemagegn	3000 metres steeplechase	9:16.97	2 Q	—		9:05.51	4
