= 2023 World Athletics Championships – Men's marathon =

Men's marathon at the 2023 World Championships
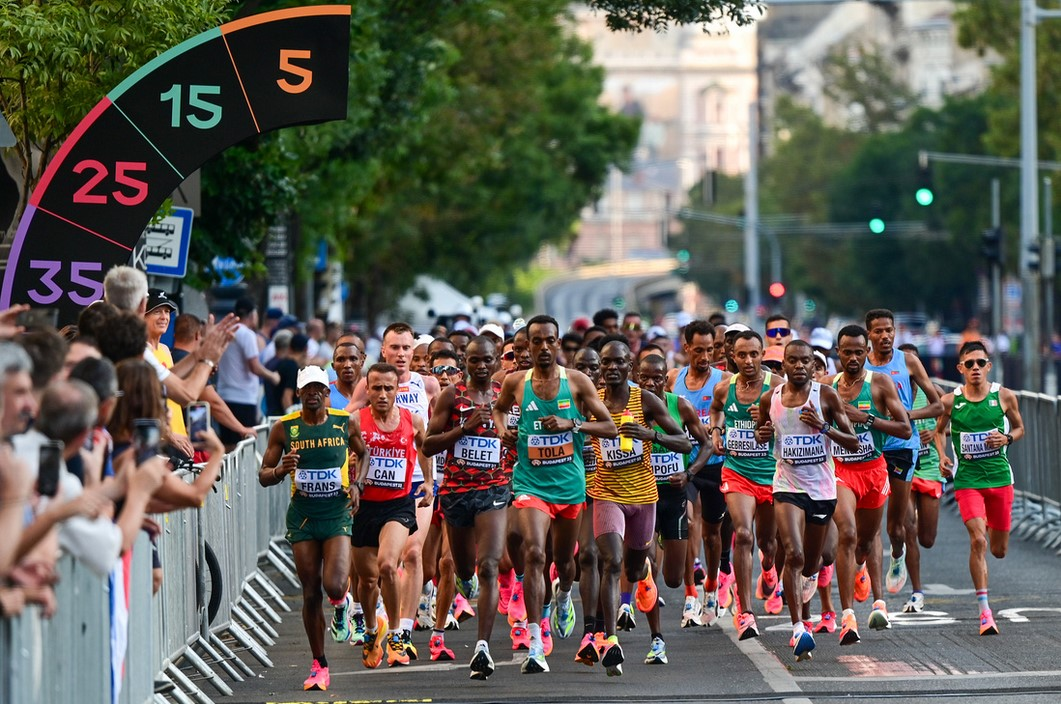
- Venue: National Athletics Centre
- Dates: 27 August
- Competitors: 85 from 42 nations
- Winning time: 2:08:53

Medalists
gold medal	Victor Kiplangat	Uganda
silver medal	Maru Teferi	Israel
bronze medal	Leul Gebresilase	Ethiopia

The men's marathon at the 2023 World Athletics Championships was held at the National Athletics Centre in Budapest on 27 August 2023.

== Records ==
Before the competition records were as follows:

Record	Athlete & Nat.	Perf.	Location	Date
World record	Eliud Kipchoge (KEN)	2:01:09	Berlin, Germany	25 September 2022
Championship record	Tamirat Tola (ETH)	2:05:36	Eugene, United States	17 July 2022
World Leading	Kelvin Kiptum (KEN)	2:01:25	London, United Kingdom	23 April 2023
African Record	Eliud Kipchoge (KEN)	2:01:09	Berlin, Germany	25 September 2022
Asian Record	El Hassan El Abbassi (BHR)	2:04:43	Valencia, Spain	2 December 2018
North, Central American and Caribbean record	Cameron Levins (CAN)	2:05:36	Tokyo, Japan	5 March 2023
South American Record	Daniel Ferreira do Nascimento (BRA)	2:04:51	Seoul, South Korea	17 April 2022
European Record	Bashir Abdi (BEL)	2:03:36	Rotterdam, Netherlands	24 October 2021
Oceanian record	Brett Robinson (AUS)	2:07:31	Fukuoka, Japan	4 December 2022

== Qualification standard ==
The standard to qualify automatically for entry was 2:09:40.

== Schedule ==
The event schedule, in local time (UTC+2), was as follows:

Date	Time	Round
27 August	07:00	Final

== Results ==
The final was started on 27 August at 06:59.

Rank	Name	Nationality	Time	Notes
1st place, gold medalist(s)	Victor Kiplangat	Uganda	2:08:53	
2nd place, silver medalist(s)	Maru Teferi	Israel	2:09:12	SB
3rd place, bronze medalist(s)	Leul Gebresilase	Ethiopia	2:09:19	
4	Tebello Ramakongoana	Lesotho	2:09:57	PB
5	Stephen Kissa	Uganda	2:10:22	
6	Milkesa Mengesha	Ethiopia	2:10:43	
7	Hassan Chahdi	France	2:10:45	SB
8	Titus Kipruto	Kenya	2:10:47	
9	Daniele Meucci	Italy	2:11:06	SB
10	Yohanes Chiappinelli	Italy	2:11:12	
11	Ichitaka Yamashita	Japan	2:11:19	
12	Zach Panning	United States	2:11:21	SB
13	Timothy Kiplagat	Kenya	2:11:25	
14	Haftom Welday	Germany	2:11:25	
15	Isaac Mpofu	Zimbabwe	2:11:33	SB
16	Tsegaye Getachew	Ethiopia	2:11:56	
17	Mehdi Frère	France	2:11:59	
18	Rory Linkletter	Canada	2:12:16	SB
19	Haimro Alame	Israel	2:12:32	
20	Tariku Novales	Spain	2:12:39	SB
21	Ayad Lamdassem	Spain	2:12:59	
22	Sondre Nordstad Moen	Norway	2:13:12	
23	Ibrahim Chakir	Spain	2:13:44	
24	Mohamed Reda El Aaraby	Morocco	2:13:55	SB
25	Johannes Motschmann	Germany	2:14:19	
26	Mustapha Houdadi	Morocco	2:14:30	
27	Ben Preisner	Canada	2:15:02	SB
28	Johnatas de Oliveira	Brazil	2:15:13	
29	Justin Kent	Canada	2:15:26	
30	Tiidrek Nurme	Estonia	2:15:42	
31	José Luis Santana	Mexico	2:15:51	
32	Berhane Tsegay Tekle	Eritrea	2:16:08	
33	Adam Nowicki	Poland	2:16:22	
34	Kenya Sonota	Japan	2:16:40	
35	Segundo Jami	Ecuador	2:16:49	
36	Ngonidzashe Ncube	Zimbabwe	2:17:02	SB
37	Yang Shaohui	China	2:17:12	
38	Paulo Roberto Paula	Brazil	2:17:18	
39	Levente Szemerei	Hungary	2:17:20	
40	Omar Hassan	Athlete Refugee Team	2:17:23	
41	Kazuya Nishiyama	Japan	2:17:41	
42	Onesphore Nzikwinkunda	Burundi	2:18:27	
43	Nicolás Cuestas	Uruguay	2:19:20	
44	He Jie	China	2:19:48	
45	Nelson Ito Ccuro	Peru	2:20:00	
46	Andrés Zamora	Uruguay	2:20:59	
47	Goitom Kifle	Eritrea	2:21:28	
48	Feng Peiyou	China	2:22:00	
49	Hüseyin Can	Turkey	2:22:11	SB
50	Tumelo Motlagale	South Africa	2:22:14	
51	Moath Alkhawaldeh	Jordan	2:22:33	SB
52	Maxim Răileanu	Moldova	2:22:46	
53	Tomas Hilifa Rainhold	Namibia	2:23:36	
54	Nico Montañez	United States	2:24:58	SB
55	Nicolae Soare	Romania	2:25:14	
56	Luis Ostos	Peru	2:25:50	
57	Justino Pedro da Silva	Brazil	2:25:53	
58	Tseveenravdangiin Byambajav	Mongolia	2:30:28	
59	Simon Sibeko	South Africa	2:31:59	
	Alphonce Simbu	Tanzania	DNF	40 km
	Tamirat Tola	Ethiopia	DNF	38 km
	Ibrahim Hassan	Djibouti	DNF	34 km
	Joaquín Arbe	Argentina	DNF	33 km
	Derlys Ayala	Paraguay	DNF	32 km
	Félicien Muhitira	Rwanda	DNF	32 km
	Andrew Rotich Kwemoi	Uganda	DNF	32 km
	Oqbe Kibrom Ruesom	Eritrea	DNF	32 km
	Simon Tesfay	Switzerland	DNF	32 km
	Elkanah Kibet	United States	DNF	31 km
	Melikhaya Frans	South Africa	DNF	30 km
	Jamsrangiin Olonbayar	Mongolia	DNF	30 km
	Morhad Amdouni	France	DNF	29 km
	Eyob Faniel	Italy	DNF	28 km
	Hassan Waiss	Djibouti	DNF	27 km
	Abdi Nageeye	Netherlands	DNF	26 km
	Joshua Belet	Kenya	DNF	25 km
	Ilie Corneschi	Romania	DNF	25 km
	Patricio Castillo	Mexico	DNF	24 km
	Olivier Irabaruta	Burundi	DNF	22 km
	Khadar Basheer Youssuf	Somalia	DNF	Half marathon
	Hamza Sahli	Morocco	DNF	19 km
	Bat-Ochiryn Ser-Od	Mongolia	DNF	12 km
	Kaan Kigen Özbilen	Turkey	DNF	2 km
	Cristhian Zamora	Uruguay	DNS	
DQ	John Hakizimana	Rwanda	~~2:10:50~~	Doping
