= United States at the 2023 World Athletics Championships =

- Flag of the United States
- WA code: USA
- National federation: USA Track & Field
- Website: usatf.org

in Budapest, Hungary August 19–27, 2023
- Competitors: 138 (70 men and 68 women) in 47 events
- Medals Ranked 1st: Gold 12 Silver 8 Bronze 9 Total 29

World Athletics Championships appearances (overview)
- 1976; 1980; 1983; 1987; 1991; 1993; 1995; 1997; 1999; 2001; 2003; 2005; 2007; 2009; 2011; 2013; 2015; 2017; 2019; 2022; 2023; 2025

The United States competed at the 2023 World Athletics Championships in Budapest, Hungary, from 19 to 27 August 2023. The selection meet for these championships was the 2023 USA Outdoor Track and Field Championships. Team members were announced on August 7.

== Medalists ==
Medal	Name	Event	Date
Gold	Ryan Crouser	Men's shot put	19 August
Gold	Matthew Boling; Rosey Effiong; Alexis Holmes; Justin Robinson; Ryan Willie*	Mixed 4 × 400 metres relay	19 August
Gold	Noah Lyles	Men's 100 metres	20 August
Gold	Grant Holloway	Men's 110 metres hurdles	21 August
Gold	Sha'Carri Richardson	Women's 100 metres	21 August
Gold	Lagi Tausaga-Collins	Women's discus throw	22 August
Gold	Katie Moon	Women's pole vault	23 August
Gold	Noah Lyles	Men's 200 metres	25 August
Gold	Chase Ealey	Women's shot put	26 August
Gold	Christian Coleman; Fred Kerley; Brandon Carnes; JT Smith*; Noah Lyles	Men's 4 × 100 metres relay	26 August
Gold	Tamari Davis; Twanisha Terry; Tamara Clark*; Melissa Jefferson*; Gabby Thomas; Sha'Carri Richardson	Women's 4 × 100 metres relay	26 August
Gold	Trevor Bassitt*; Matthew Boling*; Christopher Bailey*; Justin Robinson; Quincy Hall; Vernon Norwood; Rai Benjamin	Men's 4 × 400 metres relay	27 August
Silver	Anna Hall	Women's heptathlon	20 August
Silver	Tara Davis-Woodhall	Women's long jump	20 August
Silver	Valarie Allman	Women's discus throw	22 August
Silver	JuVaughn Harrison	Men's high jump	22 August
Silver	Janee' Kassanavoid	Women's hammer throw	24 August
Silver	Shamier Little	Women's 400 metres hurdles	24 August
Silver	Gabby Thomas	Women's 200 metres	25 August
Silver	Erriyon Knighton	Men's 200 metres	25 August
Bronze	Joe Kovacs	Men's shot put	19 August
Bronze	Daniel Roberts	Men's 110 metres hurdles	21 August
Bronze	Rai Benjamin	Men's 400 metres hurdles	23 August
Bronze	DeAnna Price	Women's hammer throw	24 August
Bronze	Keni Harrison	Women's 100 metres hurdles	24 August
Bronze	Quincy Hall	Men's 400 metres	24 August
Bronze	Sha'Carri Richardson	Women's 200 metres	25 August
Bronze	Chris Nilsen	Men's pole vault	26 August
Bronze	Athing Mu	Women's 800 metres	27 August

* – Indicates the athlete competed in preliminaries but not the final

== Results ==
United States entered 138 athletes.

Key

- Q = Qualified for the next round
- q = Qualified for the next round as a fastest loser or, in field events, by position without achieving the qualifying target
- NR = National record
- PB = Personal best
- SB = Season best
- N/A = Round not applicable for the event

=== Men ===
Track and road events

Athlete	Event	Heat		Semifinal		Final	
Athlete	Event	Result	Rank	Result	Rank	Result	Rank
Cravont Charleston	100 metres	10.18	25	Did not advance			
Christian Coleman	100 metres	9.98 (-0.1)	5 Q	9.88 SB	2 Q	9.92	5
Fred Kerley	100 metres	9.99	6 Q	10.02 (-0.3)	9	Did not advance	
Noah Lyles	100 metres	9.95 (-0.6)	2 Q	9.87 (+0.3) SB	1 Q	9.83 =WL	1st place, gold medalist(s)
Kenny Bednarek	200 metres	20.01 (-0.1)	2 Q	19.96	2 Q	20.07 (-0.2)	5
Erriyon Knighton	200 metres	20.17 (-0.5)	8 Q	19.98 (-0.4)	4 Q	19.75 (-0.2)	2nd place, silver medalist(s)
Courtney Lindsey	200 metres	20.39 (-0.2)	16 Q	20.22	9	Did not advance	
Noah Lyles	200 metres	20.05 (-0.1)	3 Q	19.76 (-0.1)	1 Q	19.52 (-0.2)	1st place, gold medalist(s)
Bryce Deadmon	400 metres	46.20	38	Did not advance			
Quincy Hall	400 metres	44.86	11 Q	44.43	4 Q	44.37 PB	3rd place, bronze medalist(s)
Vernon Norwood	400 metres	44.87	12 Q	44.26 PB	3 Q	44.39	4
Isaiah Harris	800 metres	1:48.00	44	Did not advance			
Bryce Hoppel	800 metres	1:45.56	13 Q	1:44.04	5 q	1:46.02	7
Clayton Murphy	800 metres	1:47.06	34	Did not advance			
Cole Hocker	1500 metres	3:34.43	12 Q	3:35.23	15 Q	3:30.70 PB	7
Yared Nuguse	1500 metres	3:34.16	4 Q	3:32.69	1 Q	3:30.25	5
Joe Waskom	1500 metres	3:47.26	50	Did not advance			
Paul Chelimo	5000 metres	13:36.51	18 Q	—N/a		13:30.88	15
Sean McGorty	5000 metres	13:40.28	28	—N/a		Did not advance	
Abdihamid Nur	5000 metres	13:36.37	16 Q	—N/a		13:23.90	12
Woody Kincaid	10,000 metres	—N/a				28:08.71	11
Joe Klecker	10,000 metres	—N/a				29:03.41	20
Sean McGorty	10,000 metres	—N/a				28:27.54	16
Elkanah Kibet	Marathon	—N/a				DNF	—N/a
Nico Montanez	Marathon	—N/a				2:24:58 SB	55
Zach Panning	Marathon	—N/a				2:11:21 SB	13
Freddie Crittenden	110 metres hurdles	13.40	15 Q	13.17 (-0.1) SB	4 Q	13.16 SB	4
Grant Holloway	110 metres hurdles	13.18 (-0.6)	1 Q	13.02 (-0.2)	1 Q	12.96 SB	1st place, gold medalist(s)
Daniel Roberts	110 metres hurdles	13.36 (-0.9)	11 Q	13.19 (-0.2)	6 Q	13.09	3rd place, bronze medalist(s)
Cordell Tinch	110 metres hurdles	13.49 (-0.3)	18 Q	13.31 (-0.2)	10	Did not advance	
CJ Allen	400 metres hurdles	48.36	5 Q	48.44	10	Did not advance	
Trevor Bassitt	400 metres hurdles	48.73	14 Q	47.38 SB	4 q	48.22	6
Rai Benjamin	400 metres hurdles	48.35	4 Q	47.24	2 Q	47.56	3rd place, bronze medalist(s)
Benard Keter	3000 metres steeplechase	8:24.20	20	—N/a		Did not advance	
Kenneth Rooks	3000 metres steeplechase	8:23.66	17 Q	—N/a		8:20.02	10
Isaac Updike	3000 metres steeplechase	8:31.81	30 qR	—N/a		8:30.67 PB	16
Christian Coleman; Fred Kerley; Brandon Carnes; JT Smith*; Noah Lyles	4 × 100 metres relay	37.67 WL	2 Q	—N/a		37.38 WL	1st place, gold medalist(s)
Trevor Bassitt*; Matthew Boling*; Christopher Bailey*; Justin Robinson; Quincy Hall; Vernon Norwood; Rai Benjamin	4 × 400 metres relay	2:58.47	1 Q	—N/a		2:57.31 WL	1st place, gold medalist(s)
Nick Christie	20 kilometres walk	—N/a				1:26:21 SB	41

Field events

Athlete	Event	Qualification		Final	
Athlete	Event	Distance	Position	Distance	Position
JuVaughn Harrison	High jump	2.28	1 q	2.36 =WL	2nd place, silver medalist(s)
Shelby McEwen	High jump	2.28 SB	11 q	2.29 SB	7
Vernon Turner	High jump	2.14	32	Did not advance	
Zach Bradford	Pole vault	5.70	=16	Did not advance	
Chris Nilsen	Pole vault	5.75	=1 q	5.95 SB	= (bronze)
Zach McWhorter	Pole vault	5.75	=6 q	5.75	8
Marquis Dendy	Long jump	8.08 (-1.3)	10 q	7.62 (+0.4)	12
Jarrion Lawson	Long jump	7.96	16	Did not advance	
Will Williams	Long jump	8.13 (+1.1)	7 q	7.94 (-0.4)	8
Chris Benard	Triple jump	16.71 (+0.3)	12 q	16.62 (-0.2)	9
Will Claye	Triple jump	16.72 (+0.2)	10 q	16.99 (+0.1) SB	7
Donald Scott	Triple jump	16.33 (-0.1)	22	Did not advance	
Josh Awotunde	Shot put	19.98	20	Did not advance	
Ryan Crouser	Shot put	21.48	7 Q	23.51 CR	1st place, gold medalist(s)
Joe Kovacs	Shot put	21.59	4 Q	22.12	3rd place, bronze medalist(s)
Payton Otterdahl	Shot put	21.54	5 Q	21.86	5
Sam Mattis	Discus	63.43	15	Did not advance	
Turner Washington	Discus	63.57	14	Did not advance	
Brian Williams	Discus	63.85 SB	10 q	63.62	9
Ethan Dabbs	Javelin	NM	—N/a	Did not advance	
Curtis Thompson	Javelin	74.21	30	Did not advance	
Capers Williamson	Javelin	76.10	24	Did not advance	
Daniel Haugh	Hammer throw	76.64	7 q	78.64 SB	6
Rudy Winkler	Hammer throw	77.06	6 Q	76.04	8
Alex Young	Hammer throw	69.10	31	Did not advance	

Combined events – Decathlon

Athlete	Event	100 m	LJ	SP	HJ	400 m	110H	DT	PV	JT	1500 m	Final	Rank
Kyle Garland	Result	10.59 (-0.3)	7.54 (+0.3)	14.44	2.08	49.24	13.93 (+0.2)	43.07	NM	—N/a		DNF	
Kyle Garland	Points	954	945	755	878	850	984	727	—N/a			DNF	
Harrison Williams	Result	10.74 (-0.3)	7.49 (+0.4)	15.28	1.93	46.52	14.33 (+0.2)	43.39	5.30	54.60	4:22.69 PB	8500	7
Harrison Williams	Points	919	932	807	740	982	932	734	1004	657	793	8500	7
Zach Ziemek	Result	10.58 SB (+0.1)	7.62 SB (+0.2)	15.39	1.99	DNS	—N/a					DNF	
Zach Ziemek	Points	956	965	814	794	—N/a						DNF	

=== Women ===
Track and road events

Athlete	Event	Heat		Semifinal		Final	
Athlete	Event	Result	Rank	Result	Rank	Result	Rank
Brittany Brown	100 metres	11.01 (-0.8)	4 Q	10.97 (-0.1)	6 Q	10.97 (-0.2)	7
Tamari Davis	100 metres	11.06 (-0.4)	9 Q	10.98 (-0.4)	7 Q	11.03 (-0.2)	9
Sha'Carri Richardson	100 metres	10.92 (+0.4)	1 Q	10.84 (-0.4)	3 q	10.65 (-0.2) CR	1st place, gold medalist(s)
Sha'Carri Richardson	200 metres	22.16 (-0.7)	1 Q	22.20 (-0.2)	4 Q	21.92 PB (+0.1)	3rd place, bronze medalist(s)
Gabby Thomas	200 metres	22.26 (-1.3)	2 Q	21.97 (-0.1)	1 Q	21.81 (+0.1)	2nd place, silver medalist(s)
Kayla White	200 metres	22.62 (-0.3)	14 Q	22.34 (-0.2)	9	Did not advance	
Talitha Diggs	400 metres	50.87	13 Q	50.86	11 Q	51.25	8
Britton Wilson	400 metres	53.87	46	Did not advance			
Lynna Irby-Jackson	400 metres	50.81	11 Q	50.71	8	Did not advance	
Nia Akins	800 metres	1:59.19	1 Q	1:58.61	3 Q	1:57.73 PB	6
Kaela Edwards	800 metres	2:02.22	48	Did not advance			
Athing Mu	800 metres	1:59.59	5 Q	1:58.78	4 Q	1:56.61 SB	3rd place, bronze medalist(s)
Raevyn Rogers	800 metres	2:00.06	13 Q	2:00.47	15 Q	1:57.45 SB	4
Nikki Hiltz	1500 metres	4:03.76	21 Q	4:00.84	11	Did not advance	
Sinclaire Johnson	1500 metres	4:01.09 SB	2 Q	4:06.39	22	Did not advance	
Cory McGee	1500 metres	4:03.61	19 Q	4:02.71	15 Q	4:01.60	10
Elise Cranny	5000 metres	15:01.53	13 Q	—N/a		14:59.22	9
Alicia Monson	5000 metres	15:03.35	15 Q	—N/a		15:04.08	14
Natosha Rogers	5000 metres	15:06.58	18	—N/a		Did not advance	
Elise Cranny	10,000 metres	—N/a				31:57.51 SB	12
Alicia Monson	10,000 metres	—N/a				31:32.29	5
Natosha Rogers	10,000 metres	—N/a				32:08.05	14
Keira D'Amato	Marathon	—N/a				2:31:35 SB	17
Lindsay Flanagan	Marathon	—N/a				2:27:47	9
Susanna Sullivan	Marathon	—N/a				2:44:24	58
Nia Ali	100 metres hurdles	12.55 (+0.1)	7 Q	12.49 (-0.4)	4 Q	12.78 (-0.2)	8
Keni Harrison	100 metres hurdles	12.24 (+0.1) WL	1 Q	12.33 (+0.5)	1 Q	12.46 (-0.2)	3rd place, bronze medalist(s)
Masai Russell	100 metres hurdles	12.60 (+0.1)	9 Q	DNF	—N/a	Did not advance	
Anna Cockrell	400 metres hurdles	54.68	12 Q	53.63 PB	5 Q	53.34 PB	5
Shamier Little	400 metres hurdles	54.40	8 Q	52.81 SB	1 Q	52.80 SB	2nd place, silver medalist(s)
Dalilah Muhammad	400 metres hurdles	54.21	5 Q	54.19	9	Did not advance	
Emma Coburn	3000 metres steeplechase	9:41.52	28	—N/a		Did not advance	
Krissy Gear	3000 metres steeplechase	9:30.61	22	—N/a		Did not advance	
Courtney Wayment	3000 metres steeplechase	9:20.60	11 Q	—N/a		9:25.90	15
Tamari Davis; Twanisha Terry; Tamara Clark*; Melissa Jefferson*; Gabby Thomas; Sha'Carri Richardson	4 × 100 metres relay	41.59 SB	1 Q	—N/a		41.03 CR	1st place, gold medalist(s)
Lynna Irby-Jackson; Rosey Effiong; Quanera Hayes; Alexis Holmes	4 × 400 metres relay	DQ	—N/a	—N/a		Did not advance	
Stephanie Casey	35 kilometres walk	—N/a				DQ	
Miranda Melville	35 kilometres walk	—N/a				3:09:41	35
Maria Michta-Coffey	35 kilometres walk	—N/a				3:01:22	24

Field events

Athlete	Event	Qualification		Final	
Athlete	Event	Distance	Position	Distance	Position
Vashti Cunningham	High jump	1.92	5 q	1.90	11
Hana Moll	Pole vault	4.65 PB	6 Q	4.50	=9
Katie Moon	Pole vault	4.65	=1 Q	4.90 WL	= (gold)
Sandi Morris	Pole vault	4.65	=8 Q	4.65	7
Bridget Williams	Pole vault	4.65	=8 Q	4.50	12
Quanesha Burks	Long jump	6.57 (+1.3)	16	Did not advance	
Tara Davis-Woodhall	Long jump	6.87 (-0.1)	1 Q	6.91 (+0.5)	2nd place, silver medalist(s)
Jasmine Moore	Long jump	6.73 (-1.2)	5 q	6.54 (+1.9)	10
Tori Franklin	Triple jump	14.13 (-0.6)	12 q	DNS	—N/a
Jasmine Moore	Triple jump	14.13	11 q	13.54	11
Keturah Orji	Triple jump	14.33 (-0.5)	6 Q	14.33	9
Adelaide Aquilla	Shot put	17.42	23	Did not advance	
Jalani Davis	Shot put	16.93	26	Did not advance	
Chase Ealey	Shot put	19.27	7 Q	20.43 SB	1st place, gold medalist(s)
Maggie Ewen	Shot put	19.42	4 Q	19.51	6
Valarie Allman	Discus throw	67.14	1 Q	69.23	2nd place, silver medalist(s)
Elena Bruckner	Discus throw	55.94	29	Did not advance	
Veronica Fraley	Discus throw	59.36	15	Did not advance	
Lagi Tausaga-Collins	Discus throw	64.34	5 Q	69.49 PB	1st place, gold medalist(s)
Ariana Ince	Javelin	54.60	27	Did not advance	
Maggie Malone	Javelin	57.85	18	Did not advance	
Brooke Andersen	Hammer throw	67.72	25	Did not advance	
Janee’ Kassanavoid	Hammer throw	72.70	8 q	76.36	2nd place, silver medalist(s)
DeAnna Price	Hammer throw	76.25	2 Q	75.41	3rd place, bronze medalist(s)
Jillian Shippee	Hammer throw	NM	—N/a	Did not advance	

Combined events – Heptathlon

Athlete	Event	100H	HJ	SP	200 m	LJ	JT	800 m	Final	Rank
Taliyah Brooks	Result	12.78 (+0.4) SB	1.80	13.45 PB	23.85	NM	DNS	—N/a	DNF	
Taliyah Brooks	Points	1158	978	757	995	—N/a			DNF	
Anna Hall	Result	12.97 (+0.4)	1.83	14.54 PB	23.56	6.19 (+0.8)	44.88 SB	2:04.09 CHB	6720	2nd place, silver medalist(s)
Anna Hall	Points	1129	1016	830	1023	908	761	1053	6720	2nd place, silver medalist(s)
Chari Hawkins	Result	13.04 (+0.4) PB	1.83 SB	14.40 PB	24.38	6.16 SB	45.77 PB	2:22.53	6366 PB	8
Chari Hawkins	Points	1118	1016	821	945	899	778	789	6366 PB	8

=== Mixed ===
Athlete	Event	Heat		Final	
Athlete	Event	Result	Rank	Result	Rank
Justin Robinson; Rosey Effiong; Matthew Boling; Alexis Holmes; Ryan Willie*	4 × 400 metres relay	3:10.41 WL	1 Q	3:08.80 WR	1st place, gold medalist(s)
