= 2023 World Athletics Championships – Women's 1500 metres =

Women's 1500 metres at the 2023 World Championships
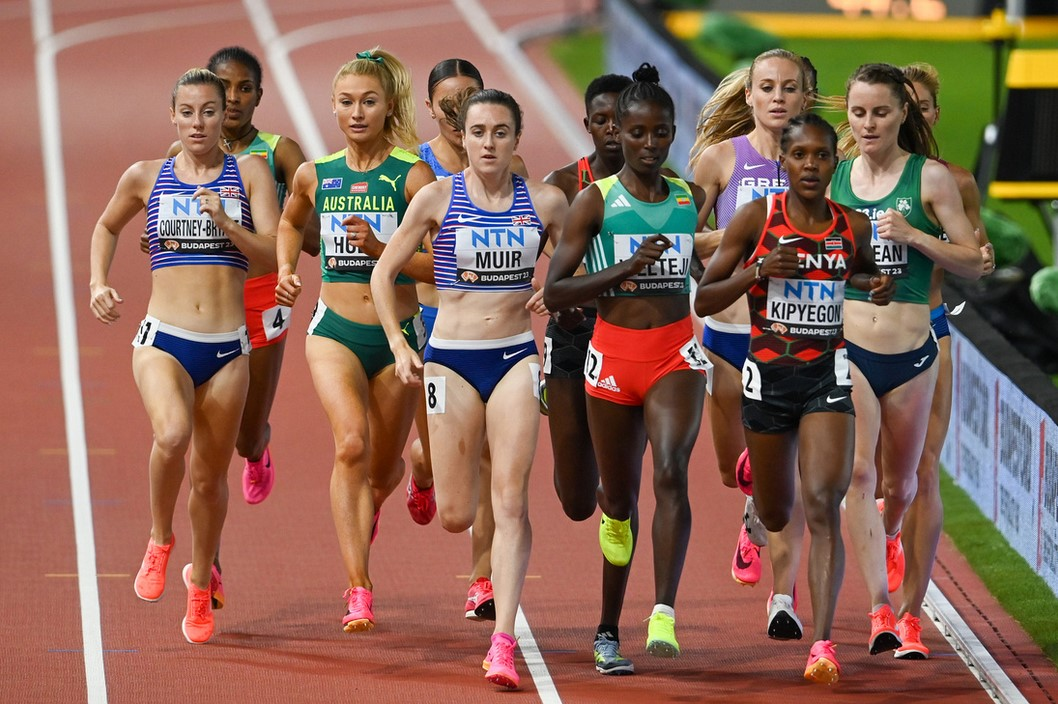
- Venue: National Athletics Centre
- Dates: 19 August (heats); 20 August (semi-finals); 22 August (final)
- Competitors: 56 from 31 nations
- Winning time: 3:54.87

Medalists
gold medal	Faith Kipyegon	Kenya
silver medal	Diribe Welteji	Ethiopia
bronze medal	Sifan Hassan	Netherlands

The women's 1500 metres at the 2023 World Athletics Championships was held at the National Athletics Centre in Budapest from 19 to 22 August 2023.

== Summary ==
Since 2015 when she lost to the world record holder Genzebe Dibaba, the only time Faith Kipyegon has lost a World title race was 2019, when Sifan Hassan ran away from the field. Both Hassan and Kipyegon were back, but Kipyegon was now the world record holder, and not only in the 1500 m; she had also taken down Hassan's mile record and the 5000 m record as well, all this year.

This year, Hassan dropped to the back as usual, but Kipyegon went right to the front, sub-31 for the first 200m. Taking her cue, Ciara Mageean, Diribe Welteji and Nelly Chepchirchir rushed to the front, later joined by Laura Muir. The pace relaxed to a more realistic 65 by the end of the first lap, and 66 for the second. It wasn't until 500 to go that Hassan made any serious effort to move forward. Ten metres before the bell, Kipyegon began to accelerate, starting to put a slight gap on the next pursuer Welteji. Hassan started the last lap 5 metres down, passing Jessica Hull into 6th place, with the fastest women in the world sprinting ahead of her. She moved into lane 2 and started passing in the turn. With 200 to go, Hassan got by Mageean into third place, but Kipyegon still had the 5-metre gap. Through the final turn, Hassan managed to get to Welteji's shoulder, but having spent so much effort to get there, she would get no further. Kipyegon still had her gap, now over both of them, which would prove to be insurmountable all the way to the finish. Hassan couldn't find another gear to overtake Welteji for silver.

== Records ==
Before the competition records were as follows:

Record	Athlete & Nat.	Perf.	Location	Date
World record	Faith Kipyegon (KEN)	3:49.11	Firenze, Italy	2 June 2023
Championship record	Sifan Hassan (NED)	3:51.95	Doha, Qatar	5 October 2019
World Leading	Faith Kipyegon (KEN)	3:49.11	Firenze, Italy	2 June 2023
African Record	Faith Kipyegon (KEN)	3:49.11	Firenze, Italy	2 June 2023
Asian Record	Qu Yunxia (CHN)	3:50.46	Beijing, China	11 September 1993
North, Central American and Caribbean record	Shelby Houlihan (USA)	3:54.99	Doha, Qatar	5 October 2019
South American Record	Letitia Vriesde (SUR)	4:05.67	Tokyo, Japan	31 August 1991
European Record	Sifan Hassan (NED)	3:51.95	Doha, Qatar	5 October 2019
Oceanian record	Linden Hall (AUS)	3:57.27	Chorzów, Poland	16 July 2023

== Qualification standard ==
The standard to qualify automatically for entry was 4:03.50.

== Schedule ==
The event schedule, in local time (UTC +2), was as follows:

Date	Time	Round
19 August	13:15	Heats
20 August	17:05	Semi-finals
22 August	21:30	Final

== Results ==
=== Heats ===
First 6 of each heat (Q) qualified to the semi-finals.

Rank	Heat	Name	Nationality	Time	Notes
1	3	Nelly Chepchirchir	Kenya	4:00.87	Q
2	3	Sinclaire Johnson	United States	4:01.09	Q, SB
3	3	Birke Haylom	Ethiopia	4:01.12	Q
4	3	Katie Snowden	Great Britain & N.I.	4:01.15	Q
5	3	Marta Pérez	Spain	4:01.41	Q, SB
6	3	Linden Hall	Australia	4:01.45	Q
7	3	Sintayehu Vissa	Italy	4:01.66	PB
8	3	Sophie O'Sullivan	Ireland	4:02.15	PB
9	2	Faith Kipyegon	Kenya	4:02.62	Q
10	2	Diribe Welteji	Ethiopia	4:02.72	Q
11	1	Sifan Hassan	Netherlands	4:02.92	Q
12	2	Sarah Healy	Ireland	4:03.00	Q
13	2	Gaia Sabbatini	Italy	4:03.04	Q
14	2	Melissa Courtney-Bryant	Great Britain & N.I.	4:03.14	Q
15	4	Hirut Meshesha	Ethiopia	4:03.47	Q
16	1	Laura Muir	Great Britain & N.I.	4:03.50	Q
17	4	Jessica Hull	Australia	4:03.50	Q
18	4	Ciara Mageean	Ireland	4:03.52	Q
19	4	Cory McGee	United States	4:03.61	Q
20	4	Adelle Tracey	Jamaica	4:03.67	Q
21	1	Nikki Hiltz	United States	4:03.76	Q
22	4	Ludovica Cavalli	Italy	4:03.81	Q
23	1	Edinah Jebitok	Kenya	4:04.09	Q
24	1	Abbey Caldwell	Australia	4:04.16	Q
25	2	Esther Guerrero	Spain	4:04.33	Q
26	1	Nozomi Tanaka	Japan	4:04.36	Q, SB
27	4	Purity Chepkirui	Kenya	4:04.51	PB
28	1	Lucia Stafford	Canada	4:05.21	
29	2	Sofia Thøgersen	Denmark	4:05.34	NR
30	1	Alma Cortes	Mexico	4:06.03	SB
31	2	Agathe Guillemot	France	4:06.18	
32	2	Aleksandra Płocińska	Poland	4:06.39	PB
33	4	Águeda Marqués	Spain	4:06.41	
34	2	Hanna Hermansson	Sweden	4:06.42	SB
35	1	Sofia Ennaoui	Poland	4:06.47	
36	2	Salomé Afonso	Portugal	4:06.55	
37	3	Kristiina Mäki	Czech Republic	4:06.90	
38	1	Nathalie Blomqvist	Finland	4:06.93	PB
39	3	Simone Plourde	Canada	4:07.04	
40	4	Kate Current	Canada	4:07.23	PB
41	4	Marta Pen	Portugal	4:07.74	
42	4	Amalie Sæten	Norway	4:08.08	PB
43	3	Eliza Megger	Poland	4:09.22	
44	1	Vera Hoffmann	Luxembourg	4:09.76	
45	3	Yume Goto	Japan	4:10.22	
46	4	Winnie Nanyondo	Uganda	4:10.55	
47	2	Carina Viljoen	South Africa	4:11.02	
48	2	Lili Anna Vindics-Tóth	Hungary	4:11.08	=PB
49	2	Elise Vanderelst	Belgium	4:11.55	
50	3	Nguyễn Thị Oanh	Vietnam	4:12.28	PB
51	1	Jaqueline Weber	Brazil	4:14.46	PB
52	3	Joceline Wind	Switzerland	4:14.86	
53	1	Şilan Ayyıldız	Turkey	4:14.96	
54	4	Fedra Luna	Argentina	4:19.00	
	1	Claudia Mihaela Bobocea	Romania	~~4:06.07~~	DSQ
	4	Gresa Bakraçi	Kosovo	DNF	

=== Semi-finals ===
First 6 of each semi-final (Q) qualified to the final.

Rank	Heat	Name	Nationality	Time	Notes
1	2	Faith Kipyegon	Kenya	3:55.14	Q
2	2	Diribe Welteji	Ethiopia	3:55.18	Q
3	2	Sifan Hassan	Netherlands	3:55.48	Q
4	2	Laura Muir	Great Britain & N.I.	3:56.36	Q
5	2	Katie Snowden	Great Britain & N.I.	3:56.72	Q
6	2	Jessica Hull	Australia	3:57.85	Q
7	2	Adelle Tracey	Jamaica	3:58.77	NR
8	2	Sarah Healy	Ireland	3:59.68	
9	2	Abbey Caldwell	Australia	3:59.79	
10	2	Esther Guerrero	Spain	4:00.13	
11	2	Nikki Hiltz	United States	4:00.84	
12	1	Nelly Chepchirchir	Kenya	4:02.14	Q
13	1	Birke Haylom	Ethiopia	4:02.46	Q
14	1	Ciara Mageean	Ireland	4:02.70	Q
15	1	Cory McGee	United States	4:02.71	Q
16	1	Melissa Courtney-Bryant	Great Britain & N.I.	4:02.79	Q
17	1	Ludovica Cavalli	Italy	4:02.83	Q
18	1	Marta Pérez	Spain	4:02.96	
19	1	Linden Hall	Australia	4:03.96	
20	1	Hirut Meshesha	Ethiopia	4:04.27	
21	1	Edinah Jebitok	Kenya	4:05.41	
22	1	Sinclaire Johnson	United States	4:06.39	
23	1	Nozomi Tanaka	Japan	4:06.71	
	2	Gaia Sabbatini	Italy	DNF	

=== Final ===
The final was started on 22 August at 21:33.

Rank	Name	Nationality	Time	Notes
1st place, gold medalist(s)	Faith Kipyegon	Kenya	3:54.87	
2nd place, silver medalist(s)	Diribe Welteji	Ethiopia	3:55.69	
3rd place, bronze medalist(s)	Sifan Hassan	Netherlands	3:56.00	
4	Ciara Mageean	Ireland	3:56.61	NR
5	Nelly Chepchirchir	Kenya	3:57.90	PB
6	Laura Muir	Great Britain & N.I.	3:58.58	
7	Jessica Hull	Australia	3:59.54	
8	Katie Snowden	Great Britain & N.I.	3:59.65	
9	Birke Haylom	Ethiopia	4:01.51	
10	Cory McGee	United States	4:01.60	
11	Ludovica Cavalli	Italy	4:01.84	PB
12	Melissa Courtney-Bryant	Great Britain & N.I.	4:03.31	
