= Switzerland at the 2023 World Athletics Championships =

- Flag of Switzerland
- WA code: SUI

in Budapest, Hungary 19−27 August 2025
- Competitors: 39 (19 men and 20 women)
- Medals: Gold 0 Silver 0 Bronze 0 Total 0

World Athletics Championships appearances
- 1976; 1980; 1983; 1987; 1991; 1993; 1995; 1997; 1999; 2001; 2003; 2005; 2007; 2009; 2011; 2013; 2015; 2017; 2019; 2022; 2023; 2025

Switzerland competed at the 2023 World Athletics Championships in Budapest, Hungary, from 19 to 27 August 2023.

== Results ==
Switzerland entered 39 athletes.

Key

- Q = Qualified for the next round
- q = Qualified for the next round as a fastest loser or, in field events, by position without achieving the qualifying target
- NR = National record
- PB = Personal best
- SB = Season best
- N/A = Round not applicable for the event

=== Men ===
Track and road events

Athlete	Event	Heat		Semifinal		Final	
Athlete	Event	Result	Rank	Result	Rank	Result	Rank
William Reais	200 metres	20.50	3 Q	20.67	8	Did not advance	
Ricky Petrucciani	400 metres	DNS		Did not advance			
Lionel Spitz	400 metres	45.69	5	Did not advance			
Tom Elmer	1500 metres	3:55.72	14 qR	3:38.33	11	Did not advance	
Jonas Raess	5000 metres	13.37.84	12	—N/a		Did not advance	
Simon Tesfay	Marathon	—N/a				DNF	
Finley Gaio	110 metres hurdles	13.61	5	Did not advance			
Jason Joseph	110 metres hurdles	13.38	4 Q	13.25	4 q	13.28	7
Julien Bonvin	400 metres hurdles	49.19 SB	3 Q	49.75	8	Did not advance	
Dany Brand	400 metres hurdles	49.69	5	Did not advance			
Enrico Güntert; Bradley Lestrade; Pascal Mancini; Felix Svensson	4 × 100 metres relay	38.65	7	—N/a		Did not advance	

Field events

Athlete	Event	Qualification		Final	
Athlete	Event	Distance	Position	Distance	Position
Dominik Alberto	Pole vault	NM		Did not advance	
Simon Ehammer	Long jump	8.13	6 q	7.87	9

=== Women ===
Track and road events

Athlete	Event	Heat		Semifinal		Final	
Athlete	Event	Result	Rank	Result	Rank	Result	Rank
Géraldine Frey	100 metres	11.26	4 q	11.28	8	Did not advance	
Mujinga Kambundji	100 metres	11.08	2 Q	11.04 SB	5	Did not advance	
Salomé Kora	100 metres	12.18	6	Did not advance			
Léonie Pointet	200 metres	23.16 PB	5	Did not advance			
Giulia Senn	400 metres	52.66	6	Did not advance			
Lore Hoffmann	800 metres	2:00.14 SB	3 Q	2:01.05	5	Did not advance	
Rachel Pellaud	800 metres	2:01.05	5	Did not advance			
Audrey Werro	800 metres	2:01.03	6	Did not advance			
Joceline Wind	1500 metres	4:14.86	14	Did not advance			
Ditaji Kambundji	100 metres hurdles	12.71	3 Q	12.50	3 q	12.70	7
Yasmin Giger	400 metres hurdles	56.16	6	Did not advance			
Géraldine Frey; Melissa Gutschmidt; Salomé Kora; Natacha Kouni	4 × 100 metres relay	42.64 SB	3 Q	—N/a		DQ	
Catia Gubelmann; Julia Niederberger; Rachel Pellaud; Giulia Senn	4 × 400 metres relay	3:29.07	6	—N/a		Did not advance	

Field events

Athlete	Event	Qualification		Final	
Athlete	Event	Distance	Position	Distance	Position
Angelica Moser	Pole vault	4.65 SB	5 Q	4.75 PB	5

Combined events – Heptathlon

Athlete	Event	100H	HJ	SP	200 m	LJ	JT	800 m	Final	Rank
Annik Kälin	Result	13.36	1.71	DNS	DNS	DNF				
Annik Kälin	Points	1071	867	0	0	DNF				

=== Mixed ===
Track events

Athlete	Event	Heat		Final	
Athlete	Event	Result	Rank	Result	Rank
Julia Niederberger; Ricky Petrucciani; Giulia Senn; Lionel Spitz	4 × 400 metres relay	3:14.38	11	Did not advance	
