= Turkey at the 2023 World Athletics Championships =

- Flag of Turkey
- WA code: TUR

in Budapest, Hungary 19 August 2023 – 27 August 2023
- Competitors: 17 (10 men and 7 women)
- Medals: Gold 0 Silver 0 Bronze 0 Total 0

World Athletics Championships appearances (overview)
- 1983; 1987; 1991; 1993; 1995; 1997; 1999; 2001; 2003; 2005; 2007; 2009; 2011; 2013; 2015; 2017; 2019; 2022; 2023

Turkey competed at the 2023 World Athletics Championships in Budapest, Hungary, from 19 to 27 August 2023.

== Results ==
Turkey entered 17 athletes.

Key

- Q = Qualified for the next round
- q = Qualified for the next round as a fastest loser or, in field events, by position without achieving the qualifying target
- NR = National record
- PB = Personal best
- SB = Season best
- N/A = Round not applicable for the event

=== Men ===
Track and road events

Athlete	Event	Heat		Semifinal		Final	
Athlete	Event	Result	Rank	Result	Rank	Result	Rank
Ramil Guliyev	200 metres	20.89	6	Did not advance			
Hüseyin Can	Marathon	—				2:22:11 SB	50
Kaan Kigen Özbilen	Marathon	—				DNF	
Mikdat Sevler	110 metres hurdles	13.92	9	Did not advance			
Yasmani Copello	400 metres hurdles	48.92	5 q	48.66 SB	6	Did not advance	
İsmail Nezir	400 metres hurdles	49.92	6	Did not advance			
Salih Korkmaz	20 kilometres walk	—				1:19:49 SB	16

Field events

Athlete	Event	Qualification		Final	
Athlete	Event	Distance	Position	Distance	Position
Alperen Acet	High jump	2.22	23	Did not advance	
Ersu Şaşma	Pole vault	5.75	8 q	5.55	12
Necati Er	Triple jump	16.59	16	Did not advance	

=== Women ===
Track and road events

Athlete	Event	Heat		Semifinal		Final	
Athlete	Event	Result	Rank	Result	Rank	Result	Rank
Şilan Ayyildiz	1500 metres	4:14.96	14	Did not advance			
Yayla Gönen	Marathon	—				DNF	
Ümmü Kiraz	Marathon	—				2:33:23 PB	23
Tuğba Güvenç	3000 metres steeplechase	9:50.96	10	—		Did not advance	
Meryem Bekmez	20 kilometres walk	—				DNF	

Field events

Athlete	Event	Qualification		Final	
Athlete	Event	Distance	Position	Distance	Position
Tuğba Danışmaz	Triple jump	14.11	14	Did not advance	
Eda Tuğsuz	Javelin throw	NM		Did not advance	
