= Norway at the 2023 World Athletics Championships =

- Flag of Norway
- WA code: NOR

in Budapest, Hungary 19 August 2023 – 27 August 2023
- Competitors: 27 (17 men and 10 women)
- Medals Ranked 9th: Gold 2 Silver 1 Bronze 1 Total 4

World Athletics Championships appearances (overview)
- 1980; 1983; 1987; 1991; 1993; 1995; 1997; 1999; 2001; 2003; 2005; 2007; 2009; 2011; 2013; 2015; 2017; 2019; 2022; 2023; 2025

Norway competed at the 2023 World Athletics Championships in Budapest, Hungary, from 19 to 27 August 2023.

== Medalists ==
Medal	Athlete	Event	Date
Gold	Karsten Warholm	Men's 400 metres hurdles	August 23
Gold	Jakob Ingebrigtsen	Men's 5000 metres	August 27
Silver	Jakob Ingebrigtsen	Men's 1500 metres	August 23
Bronze	Narve Gilje Nordås	Men's 1500 metres	August 23

== Results ==
Norway entered 27 athletes.

Key

- Q = Qualified for the next round
- q = Qualified for the next round as a fastest loser or, in field events, by position without achieving the qualifying target
- NR = National record
- PB = Personal best
- SB = Season best
- N/A = Round not applicable for the event

=== Men ===
Track and road events

Athlete	Event	Heat		Semifinal		Final	
Athlete	Event	Result	Rank	Result	Rank	Result	Rank
Håvard Bentdal Ingvaldsen	400 metres	44.39 NR	1 Q	44.70	3 q	45.08	6
Ole Jakob Solbu	800 metres	1:51.66	8	Did not advance			
Jakob Ingebrigtsen	1500 metres	3:33.94	1 Q	3:34.98	1 Q	3:29.65	2nd place, silver medalist(s)
Narve Gilje Nordås	1500 metres	3:34.67	5 Q	3:32.81	5 Q	3:29.68	3rd place, bronze medalist(s)
Henrik Ingebrigtsen	5000 metres	13:38.80	13	—N/a		Did not advance	
Jakob Ingebrigtsen	5000 metres	13:36.21	3 Q	—N/a		13:11.30	1st place, gold medalist(s)
Magnus Tuv Myhre	5000 metres	13:36.36	11	—N/a		Did not advance	
Narve Gilje Nordås	5000 metres	13.36.55	8 Q	—N/a		13:28.73	14
Zerei Kbrom Mezngi	10,000 metres	—N/a				28:30.76	18
Sondre Nordstad Moen	Marathon	—N/a				2:13:12	23
Karsten Warholm	400 metres hurdles	48.76	2 Q	47.09	1 Q	46.89	1st place, gold medalist(s)

Field events

Athlete	Event	Qualification		Final	
Athlete	Event	Distance	Position	Distance	Position
Sondre Guttormsen	Pole vault	5.55	=20	Did not advance	
Pål Haugen Lillefosse	Pole vault	NM		Did not advance	
Ingar Bratseth-Kiplesund	Long jump	7.47	31	Did not advance	
Marcus Thomsen	Shot put	19.97	21	Did not advance	
Eivind Henriksen	Hammer throw	75.37	9 q	77.06 SB	7
Thomas Mardal	Hammer throw	73.13	16	Did not advance	

Combined events – Decathlon

Athlete	Event	100 m	LJ	SP	HJ	400 m	110H	DT	PV	JT	1500 m	Final	Rank
Markus Rooth	Result	10.84	7.62 PB	13.22	2.02	48.27 PB	14.47	48.78 SB	5.10	64.84	4:34.11	8491	8
Markus Rooth	Points	897	965	681	822	896	915	845	941	811	718	8491	8
Sander Skotheim	Result	10.89	7.80 PB	13.35	2.11	48.48	14.96	39.07	4.80	59.05	4:19.64	8263	10
Sander Skotheim	Points	885	1010	689	906	886	854	646	849	724	814	8263	10

=== Women ===
Track and road events

Athlete	Event	Heat		Semifinal		Final	
Athlete	Event	Result	Rank	Result	Rank	Result	Rank
Christine Bjelland Jensen	200 metres	23.62	7	Did not advance			
Henriette Jæger	400 metres	51.33	4	Did not advance			
Hedda Hynne	800 metres	2:01:00 SB	4	Did not advance			
Amalie Sæten	1500 metres	4:08:08 PB	11	Did not advance			
Karoline Bjerkeli Grøvdal	5000 metres	15:08.96	11	—N/a		Did not advance	
Line Kloster	400 metres hurdles	55.23	4 Q	55.43	7	Did not advance	

Field events

Athlete	Event	Qualification		Final	
Athlete	Event	Distance	Position	Distance	Position
Lene Retzius	Pole vault	4.60 SB	15	Did not advance	
Beatrice Nedberge Llano	Hammer throw	69.11	21	Did not advance	
Sigrid Borge	Javelin throw	53.34	34	Did not advance	
