= Japan at the 2023 World Athletics Championships =

- Flag of Japan
- WA code: JPN

in Budapest, Hungary 19 August 2023 – 27 August 2023
- Competitors: 76 (48 men and 28 women)
- Medals Ranked 15th: Gold 1 Silver 0 Bronze 1 Total 2

World Athletics Championships appearances
- 1983; 1987; 1991; 1993; 1995; 1997; 1999; 2001; 2003; 2005; 2007; 2009; 2011; 2013; 2015; 2017; 2019; 2022; 2023; 2025

Japan competed at the 2023 World Athletics Championships in Budapest, Hungary, from 19 to 27 August 2023.

== Medallists ==
Medal	Name	Event	Date
Gold	Haruka Kitaguchi	Women's javelin throw	25 August
Bronze	Masatora Kawano	Men's 35 kilometres walk	24 August

== Results ==
Japan entered with 76 athletes.

Key

- Q = Qualified for the next round
- q = Qualified for the next round as a fastest loser or, in field events, by position without achieving the qualifying target
- NR = National record
- PB = Personal best
- SB = Season best
- N/A = Round not applicable for the event

=== Men ===
Track and road events

Athlete	Event	Heat		Semifinal		Final	
Athlete	Event	Result	Rank	Result	Rank	Result	Rank
Ryuichiro Sakai	100 metres	10.22	5	Did not advance			
Abdul Hakim Sani Brown	100 metres	10.07 SB	1 Q	9.97 =PB	2 Q	10.04	6
Hiroki Yanagita	100 metres	10.20	3 Q	10.14	7	Did not advance	
Shōta Iizuka	200 metres	20.27 SB	4 q	20.54	7	Did not advance	
Koki Ueyama	200 metres	20.66	4	Did not advance			
Towa Uzawa	200 metres	20.34	1 Q	20.33	5	Did not advance	
Yuki Joseph Nakajima	400 metres	45.15	3 Q	45.04	3	Did not advance	
Fuga Sato	400 metres	44.97 PB	2 Q	44.88 PB	4	Did not advance	
Kentaro Sato	400 metres	44.77 NR	2 Q	44.99	5	Did not advance	
Hyuga Endo	5000 metres	13:50.49	17	—N/a		Did not advance	
Kazuya Shiojiri	5000 metres	13:51.00	18	—N/a		Did not advance	
Ren Tazawa	10,000 metres	—N/a				28:25.85	15
Kazuya Nishiyama	Marathon	—N/a				2:17:41	42
Kenya Sonota	Marathon	—N/a				2:16:40	35
Ichitaka Yamashita	Marathon	—N/a				2:11:19	12
Shunsuke Izumiya	110 metres hurdles	13.33	2 Q	13.16	1 Q	13.19	5
Shunya Takayama	110 metres hurdles	13.35	2 Q	13.34	5	Did not advance	
Taiga Yokochi	110 metres hurdles	14.39	8 qR	14.93	9	Did not advance	
Takayuki Kishimoto	400 metres hurdles	50.90	8	Did not advance			
Yusaku Kodama	400 metres hurdles	50.18	8	Did not advance			
Kazuki Kurokawa	400 metres hurdles	48.71 SB	3 Q	48.58 PB	4	Did not advance	
Ryoma Aoki	3000 metres steeplechase	8:20.54 SB	5 Q	—N/a		8:24.77	14
Ryuji Miura	3000 metres steeplechase	8:18.73	4 Q	—N/a		8:13.70	6
Seiya Sunada	3000 metres steeplechase	8:38.59	11	—N/a		Did not advance	
Koki Ikeda	20 kilometres walk	—N/a				1:19:44	15
Yuta Koga	20 kilometres walk	—N/a				1:19:02 SB	12
Eiki Takahashi	20 kilometres walk	—N/a				1:20:25	21
Toshikazu Yamanishi	20 kilometres walk	—N/a				1:21:39	24
Masatora Kawano	35 kilometres walk	—N/a				2:25:12	3rd place, bronze medalist(s)
Satoshi Maruo	35 kilometres walk	—N/a				2:25:50	6
Tomohiro Noda	35 kilometres walk	—N/a				2:29:52	13
Yuki Koike; Ryuichiro Sakai; Abdul Hakim Sani Brown; Hiroki Yanagita	4 × 100 metres relay	37.71 SB	3 Q	—N/a		37.83	5
Naohiro Jinushi; Yuki Joseph Nakajima; Fuga Sato; Kentaro Sato	4 × 400 metres relay	3:00.39 SB	5	—N/a		Did not advance	

Field events

Athlete	Event	Qualification		Final	
Athlete	Event	Distance	Position	Distance	Position
Ryoichi Akamatsu	High jump	2.28	1 q	2.25	=8
Naoto Hasegawa	High jump	2.25 =SB	18	Did not advance	
Tomohiro Shinno	High jump	2.18	31	Did not advance	
Tomoya Karasawa	Pole vault	NM		Did not advance	
Yuki Hashioka	Long jump	7.94	17	Did not advance	
Shotaro Shiroyama	Long jump	7.46	32	Did not advance	
Hiromichi Yoshida	Long jump	7.60	28	Did not advance	
Hikaru Ikehata	Triple jump	16.40	19	Did not advance	
Genki Dean	Javelin throw	79.21	14	Did not advance	
Kenji Ogura	Javelin throw	76.65	22	Did not advance	
Yuta Sakiyama	Javelin throw	NM		Did not advance	

Combined events – Decathlon

Athlete	Event	100 m	LJ	SP	HJ	400 m	110H	DT	PV	JT	1500 m	Final	Rank
Yuma Maruyama	Result	10.90	7.00	13.40	1.96	50.75	14.18	41.56	4.60	60.14	4:32.01	7844 PB	15
Yuma Maruyama	Points	883	814	692	767	780	951	696	790	740	730	7844 PB	15

=== Women ===
Track and road events

Athlete	Event	Heat		Semifinal		Final	
Athlete	Event	Result	Rank	Result	Rank	Result	Rank
Arisa Kimishima	100 metres	11.73	7	Did not advance			
Remi Tsuruta	200 metres	23.49	6	Did not advance			
Yume Goto	1500 metres	4:10.22	12	Did not advance			
Nozomi Tanaka	1500 metres	4:04.36 SB	6 Q	4:06.71	12	Did not advance	
Ririka Hironaka	5000 metres	15:11.16 SB	12	—N/a		Did not advance	
Nozomi Tanaka	5000 metres	14:37.98 NR	6 Q	—N/a		14:58.99	8
Yuma Yamamoto	5000 metres	16:05.57	20	—N/a		Did not advance	
Rino Goshima	10,000 metres	—N/a				33:20.38	20
Ririka Hironaka	10,000 metres	—N/a				31:35.12 SB	7
Rika Kaseda	Marathon	—N/a				2:31:53	19
Mizuki Matsuda	Marathon	—N/a				2:29:15	13
Sayaka Sato	Marathon	—N/a				2:31:57	20
Masumi Aoki	100 metres hurdles	13.26	8	Did not advance			
Yumi Tanaka	100 metres hurdles	13.12	7	Did not advance			
Asuka Terada	100 metres hurdles	13.15	6	Did not advance			
Eri Utsunomiya	400 metres hurdles	57.98	8	Did not advance			
Ami Yamamoto	400 metres hurdles	57.76	8	Did not advance			
Nanako Fujii	20 kilometres walk	—N/a				1:30:10	14
Yukiko Umeno	20 kilometres walk	—N/a				1:36:52	35
Ayane Yanai	20 kilometres walk	—N/a				1:34:59	30
Masumi Fuchise	35 kilometres walk	—N/a				2:52:57 PB	14
Serena Sonoda	35 kilometres walk	—N/a				2:46:32	7

Field events

Athlete	Event	Qualification		Final	
Athlete	Event	Distance	Position	Distance	Position
Sumire Hata	Long jump	6.41	23	Did not advance	
Mariko Morimoto	Triple jump	13.64	=26	Did not advance	
Maoko Takashima	Triple jump	13.34	34	Did not advance	
Maki Saito	Discus throw	53.20	36	Did not advance	
Haruka Kitaguchi	Javelin throw	63.27	3 Q	66.73	1st place, gold medalist(s)
Marina Saito	Javelin throw	58.95	15	Did not advance	
Momone Ueda	Javelin throw	56.19	21	Did not advance	
