= Eritrea at the 2023 World Athletics Championships =

- Flag of Eritrea
- WA code: ERI

in Budapest, Hungary 19 August 2023 – 27 August 2023
- Competitors: 7 (5 men and 2 women)
- Medals: Gold 0 Silver 0 Bronze 0 Total 0

World Athletics Championships appearances
- 1997; 1999; 2001; 2003; 2005; 2007; 2009; 2011; 2013; 2015; 2017; 2019; 2022; 2023

Eritrea competed at the 2023 World Athletics Championships in Budapest, Hungary, from 19 to 27 August 2023.

== Results ==
Eritrea entered 7 athletes.

Key

- Q = Qualified for the next round
- q = Qualified for the next round as a fastest loser or, in field events, by position without achieving the qualifying target
- NR = National record
- PB = Personal best
- SB = Season best
- N/A = Round not applicable for the event

=== Men ===
Track and road events

Athlete	Event	Final	
Athlete	Event	Result	Rank
Merhawi Mebrahtu	10,000 metres	28:50.62	19
Goitom Kifle	Marathon	2:21:28	48
Oqbe Kibrom Ruesom	Marathon	DNF	
Berhane Tsegay Tekle	Marathon	2:16:08	33

=== Women ===
Track and road events

Athlete	Event	Final	
Athlete	Event	Result	Rank
Dolshi Tesfu	Marathon	2:28:54	10
Nazret Weldu	Marathon	2:27:23 SB	8
