= Sweden at the 2023 World Athletics Championships =

- Flag of Sweden
- WA code: SWE

in Budapest, Hungary 19 August 2023 – 27 August 2023
- Competitors: 32 (18 men and 14 women)
- Medals Ranked 10th: Gold 2 Silver 1 Bronze 0 Total 3

World Athletics Championships appearances (overview)
- 1976; 1980; 1983; 1987; 1991; 1993; 1995; 1997; 1999; 2001; 2003; 2005; 2007; 2009; 2011; 2013; 2015; 2017; 2019; 2022; 2023; 2025

Sweden competed at the 2023 World Athletics Championships in Budapest, Hungary, from 19 to 27 August 2023.

== Medalists ==
Medal	Athlete	Event	Date
Gold	Daniel Ståhl	Men's discus throw	August 21
Gold	Armand Duplantis	Men's pole vault	August 26
Silver	Perseus Karlström	Men's 20 kilometres walk	August 19

== Results ==
Sweden entered 32 athletes.

=== Men ===
Track and road events

Athlete	Event	Heat		Semifinal		Final	
Athlete	Event	Result	Rank	Result	Rank	Result	Rank
Henrik Larsson	100 metres	10.16	3 Q	10.20	6	Did not advance	
Carl Bengtström	400 metres	DQ		Did not advance			
Andreas Kramer	800 metres	1:45.42	2 Q	1:44.57	6	Did not advance	
Emil Danielsson	1500 metres	3:57.70	15 qR	3:34.16 PB	12	Did not advance	
Andreas Almgren	5000 metres	13:36.57	9	—N/a		Did not advance	
Emil Danielsson	5000 metres	13:54.35	18	—N/a		Did not advance	
Joel Bengtsson	110 metres hurdles	13.68	6	Did not advance			
Max Hrelja	110 metres hurdles	13.42 PB	4 Q	13.60	6	Did not advance	
Emil Blomberg	3000 metres steeplechase	8:42.33	12	—N/a		Did not advance	
Vidar Johansson	3000 metres steeplechase	8:27.21	9	—N/a		Did not advance	
Simon Sundström	3000 metres steeplechase	8:20.10 PB	5 Q	—N/a		8:27.68	15
Perseus Karlström	20 kilometres walk	—N/a				1:17:39 NR	2nd place, silver medalist(s)
Perseus Karlström	35 kilometres walk	—N/a				2:27:03 SB	8

Field events

Athlete	Event	Qualification		Final	
Athlete	Event	Distance	Position	Distance	Position
Armand Duplantis	Pole vault	5.75	1 q	6.10	1st place, gold medalist(s)
Thobias Montler	Long jump	8.03	11 q	8.00	6
Simon Pettersson	Discus throw	62.53	21	Did not advance	
Daniel Ståhl	Discus throw	66.25	1 q	71.46 CR	1st place, gold medalist(s)
Ragnar Carlsson	Hammer throw	72.02	24	Did not advance	
Jakob Samuelsson	Javelin throw	75.50	26	Did not advance	

Combined events – Decathlon

Athlete	Event	100 m	LJ	SP	HJ	400 m	110H	DT	PV	JT	1500 m	Final	Rank
Marcus Nilsson	Result	11.43	7.00 SB	14.49	1.93	51.36 SB	15.06 SB	45.04	NM	DNF			
Marcus Nilsson	Points	677	814	758	740	780	842	768	0	DNF			

=== Women ===
Track and road events

Athlete	Event	Heat		Semifinal		Final	
Athlete	Event	Result	Rank	Result	Rank	Result	Rank
Julia Henriksson	200 metres	23.55	6	Did not advance			
Hanna Hermansson	1500 metres	4:06.42 SB	10	Did not advance			
Sarah Lahti	5000 metres	DNS		—N/a		Did not advance	
Sarah Lahti	10,000 metres	—N/a				33:09.22 SB	18
Moa Granat	400 metres hurdles	56.61	7	Did not advance			

Field events

Athlete	Event	Qualification		Final	
Athlete	Event	Distance	Position	Distance	Position
Michaela Meijer	Pole vault	4.50	17	Did not advance	
Maja Åskag	Long jump	6.47	20	Did not advance	
Tilde Johansson	Long jump	5.99	34	Did not advance	
Khaddi Sagnia	Long jump	6.35	28	Did not advance	
Maja Åskag	Triple jump	13.98	16	Did not advance	
Axelina Johansson	Shot put	18.57	13	Did not advance	
Sara Lennman	Shot put	18.05	18	Did not advance	
Fanny Roos	Shot put	18.41	14	Did not advance	
Vanessa Kamga	Discus throw	60.02 SB	13	Did not advance	
Caisa-Marie Lindfors	Discus throw	54.54	32	Did not advance	
Grete Ahlberg	Hammer throw	69.05	22	Did not advance	
