= Fatima Ezzahra Gardadi =

Moroccan long-distance runner

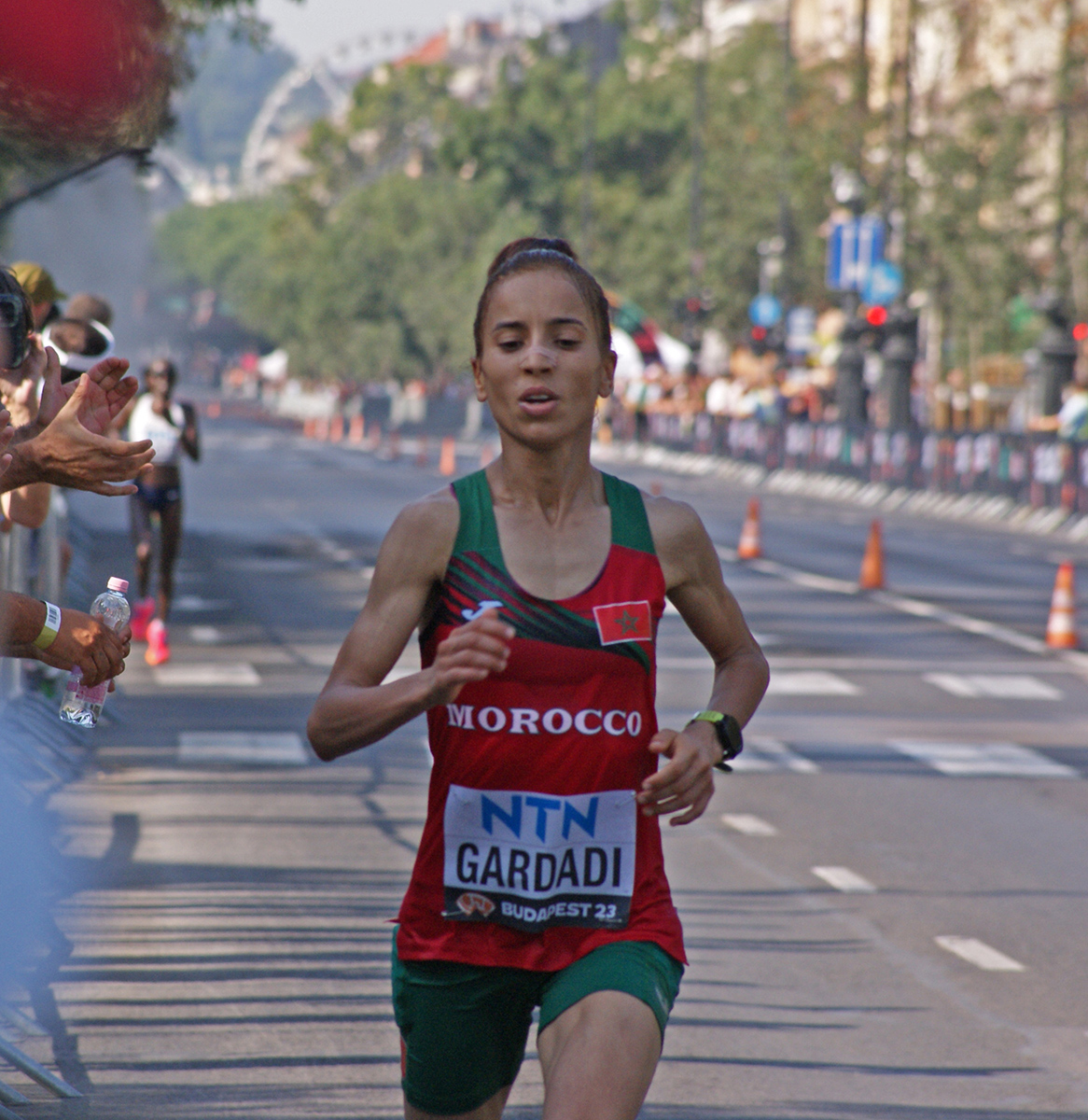

Personal information
- Nationality: Moroccan
- Born: 19 March 1992 (age 34)

Sport
- Country: Morocco
- Sport: Athletics
- Event: Long-distance running

Achievements and titles
- Personal best: Marathon: 2:25:03 (Rabat 2023)
Medal record
Women's athletics
Representing Morocco
World Championships
Bronze medal – third place	2023 Budapest	Marathon

Fatima Ezzahra Gardadi (Arabic: فاطمة الزهراء كردادي, born 20 March 1992) is a Moroccan long-distance runner. She won the bronze medal in the marathon at the 2023 World Athletics Championships in a time of 2:25:17.

== Career ==
Since 2010, Gardadi has been competing in athletics competitions at the national level over distances from 800 metres to the half marathon. In 2022, she won her debut marathon in Marrakesh with a time of 2:25:07. In her next marathon race, the Rabat Marathon, she won again and lowered her personal best by four seconds, qualifying for the Moroccan team in the marathon at the 2023 World Athletics Championships in Budapest. On 26 August 2023, she placed third to earn the bronze medal in the women's marathon. She dedicated this achievement to king Mohammed VI.
