= Amane Beriso Shankule =

Ethiopian long-distance runner

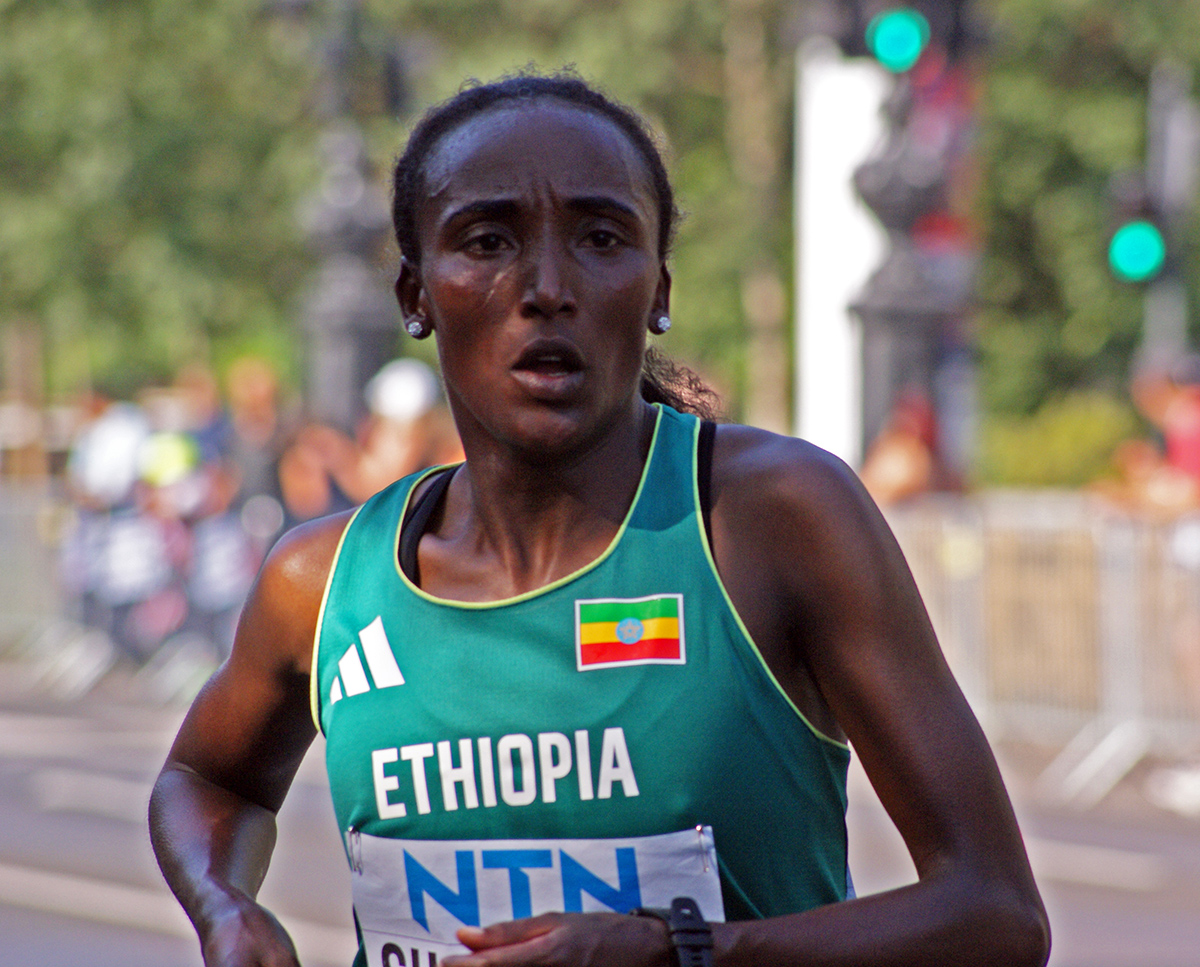
- Beriso in 2023

Personal information
- Full name: Amane Beriso Shankule
- Nationality: Ethiopian
- Born: 13 October 1991 (age 34) Kokosa, Oromia, Ethiopia

Sport
- Country: Ethiopia
- Sport: Athletics
- Event: Long-distance running
- Coached by: Gemedu Dedefo

Achievements and titles
- Personal best: Marathon: 2:14:58 NR (Valencia 2022)
Medal record
Women's athletics
Representing Ethiopia
World Championships
Gold medal – first place	2023 Budapest	Marathon
World Marathon Majors
Silver medal – second place	2023 Boston	Marathon
Bronze medal – third place	2024 Tokyo	Marathon

Amane Beriso Shankule (born 13 October 1991) is an Ethiopian long-distance runner. In 2023, she won the marathon at the 2023 World Athletics Championships in Budapest. In 2022, she improved her marathon personal best by nearly six minutes to take the win at the 2022 Valencia Marathon, placing third on the world all-time list. Beriso finished second at the 2023 Boston Marathon. in 2024, she finished 3rd in the Tokyo Marathon (2:16:58) and 5th in the Paris Olympics marathon (2:23:57).

== Career ==
Beriso Shankule won the Copenhagen Half Marathon in 2014. A year later, the 23-year-old set an unofficial personal best in the event of 1:08:43 when winning Roma-Ostia Half Marathon. In 2016, she debuted in the marathon taking the second place at the Dubai Marathon with a time of 2:20:48, a position which she also secured at the 2017 Prague Marathon (2:22:15).

After 2017 Prague Marathon, Beriso Shankule dealt with a series of injuries to her leg and knee. She won the Mumbai Marathon in 2020 (2:24:51) but was never fully healthy until 2022.

In August 2022, she took victory at the Mexico City Marathon at an elevation of over 7,000 feet (2:25:05). On 4 December, the 31-year-old pulled off a big upset with a 2:14:58 win at the Valencia Marathon, an improvement of 5:50 on her 2016 personal best, to set a course record, Ethiopian national record and move to third on the world all-time ranking list. She became only the third woman ever to break 2:15:00 and according to her coach world record (2:14:04) would have been achievable if the pacemakers, who stayed with struggling Letesenbet Gidey after the 36 km mark, had run with her.

In April 2023, Beriso Shankule finished second at the Boston Marathon with a time of 2:21:50, 12 seconds behind Hellen Obiri. and in December 2023, Beriso Shankule finished third in the 15 kilometres Montferland Run in 's-Heerenberg with a time of 47:53, 13 seconds behind Medina Eisa.

== Personal bests ==
- 10 kilometres – 32:52 (Langueux 2015)
- 15 kilometres – 47:53 ('s-Heerenberg 2023)
- Half marathon – 1:10:54 (Warsaw 2015) (1:08:43 not legal, 2015)
- Marathon – 2:14:58 (Valencia 2022) NR, 3rd fastest of all time
