= J. T. Smith (sprinter) =

American athlete

Personal information
- Nationality: American
- Born: January 12, 1998 (age 28)
- Agent: Mark A Pryor World Express Sports Mgmt

Sport
- Sport: Athletics
- Event: Sprint

Achievements and titles
- Personal best(s): 100 m:10.02 (Eugene, 2023); 200 m: 20.32 (Commerce, 2023)
Medal record
Men's athletics
Representing the United States
World Championships
Gold medal – first place	2023 Budapest	4 × 100 m relay

J. T. Smith (born January 12, 1998) is an American track and field athlete who competes as a sprinter. In 2023, he became the US national champion over 60 m indoors.

== Early life ==
From Klein, Texas, the son of Marcey Monroe, he attended Klein Oak High School. He then attended Texas A&M University–Commerce.

== Career ==
Smith won the NCAA Division 2 National Championships in 2022 in the 100 metres.

In February 2023, Smith won gold at the 2023 USA Indoor Track and Field Championships in the 60 m, in Albuquerque, New Mexico.

Competing at the 2023 USA Outdoor Track and Field Championships, in Eugene, Oregon, he reached the final of the 100 m competition, finishing fifth. He was selected for the 2023 World Athletics Championships in Budapest in August 2023. Smith did not run in the final, but still received a gold medal after running in the heats.
