= Joel Ayeko =

Ugandan long-distance runner

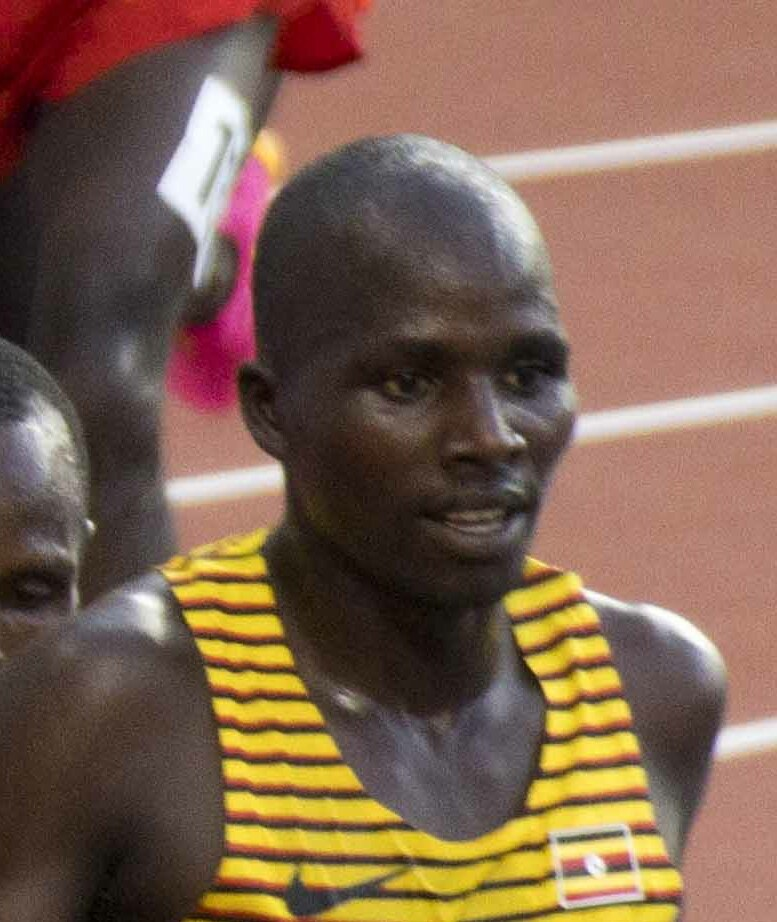
- Joel Ayeko at the 2023 World Athletics Championships

Personal information
- Born: 5 September 1998 (age 27)

Sport
- Country: Uganda
- Sport: Long-distance running

Joel Ayeko (born 5 September 1998) is a Ugandan long-distance runner.

He won a silver medal at the 2017 World Mountain Running Championships and a gold medal in the team competition there, as well as the exact same combination at the 2018 World Mountain Running Championships.

At the 2019 World Cross Country Championships he finished tenth in the senior race and won a gold medal in the team competition.

His personal best times are 28:33 minutes in the 10 kilometres, achieved in June 2019 in Wierden; and 46:42 minutes in the 10 miles, achieved in September 2019 in Amsterdam.
