= 2023 World Athletics Championships =

Athletics competition in Budapest, Hungary

World Athletics Championships Budapest 2023
- Host city: Budapest
- Country: Hungary
- Motto: Witness The Wonder (Hungarian: Láss csodát!)
- Organisers: World Athletics, Hungarian Athletics Association
- Edition: 19th
- Nations: 195
- Athletes: 2001
- Events: 49
- Dates: 19–27 August 2023
- Opened by: President Katalin Novák
- Closed by: World Athletics President Sebastian Coe
- Main venue: National Athletics Centre
- Website: Budapest23

The 2023 World Athletics Championships (Hungarian: 2023-as atlétikai világbajnokság), the nineteenth edition of the World Athletics Championships, were held from 19 to 27 August 2023 at the National Athletics Centre, in Budapest, Hungary. The tournament returned to its usual two-year cycle after the previous event in Eugene, Oregon, United States was postponed to 2022, held 13 months earlier due to the COVID-19 pandemic.

These are the first World Athletics Championships in Hungary. The city of Budapest had previously stated an interest in hosting the 2007 World Championships, but withdrew and it was eventually held in Osaka.

== Schedule ==
Event schedule
Saturday, August 19, 2023
Local Time (CEST)	Gender	Event	Division Round
CEST Time	Track Events		
8:50	M	20 km Race Walk	Final
10:35	W	100 m hurdles	Heptathlon
11:05	Mixed	4x400 m relay	Prelim
11:35	M	3000 m steeplechase	Prelim
12:35	M	100 m	Prelim
13:15	W	1500 m	Prelim
19:02	M	1500 m	Prelim
19:43	M	100 m	Prelim
20:30	W	200 m	Heptathlon
20:55	W	10,000 m	Final
21:47	Mixed	4x400 m relay	Final
CEST Time	Field Events		
10:30	M	Shot Put	Prelim
11:45	W	High Jump	Heptathlon
12:00	M	Hammer Throw	Prelim (A)
12:25	W	Long Jump	Prelim
13:40	M	Hammer Throw	Prelim (B)
19:05	W	Shot Put	Heptathlon
19:10	M	Discus Throw	Prelim (A)
19:35	M	Triple Jump	Prelim
20:35	M	Shot Put	Final
20:40	M	Discus Throw	Prelim (B)
Sunday, August 20, 2023
CEST Time	Track Events		
7:15	W	20 km Race Walk	Final
9:35	W	400 m	Prelim
10:25	M	400 m	Prelim
11:25	M	400 m hurdles	Prelim
12:10	W	100 m	Prelim
13:05	M	110 m hurdles	Prelim
16:35	M	100 m	Semi-Final
17:05	W	1500 m	Semi-Final
17:35	M	1500 m	Semi-Final
18:00	W	800 m	Heptathlon
18:25	M	10,000 m	Final
19:10	M	100 m	Final
CEST Time	Field Events		
9:00	W	Discus Throw	Prelim (A)
9:50	W	Long Jump	Heptathlon
10:30	W	Discus Throw	Prelim (B)
10:35	M	High Jump	Prelim
12:00	W	Javelin Throw	Heptathlon (A)
13:05	W	Javelin Throw	Heptathlon (B)
16:55	W	Long Jump	Final
17:50	M	Hammer Throw	Final
Monday, August 21, 2023
CEST Time	Track Events		
18:50	W	400 m hurdles	Prelim
19:35	M	400 m hurdles	Semi-Final
20:05	M	110 m hurdles	Semi-Final
20:35	W	100 m	Semi-Final
21:10	W	400 m	Semi-Final
21:40	M	110 m hurdles	Final
21:50	W	100 m	Final
CEST Time	Field Events		
18:40	W	Pole Vault	Prelim
19:40	M	Triple Jump	Final
20:30	M	Discus Throw	Final
Tuesday, August 22, 2023
CEST Time	Track Events		
18:40	W	100 m hurdles	Prelim
19:20	M	800 m	Prelim
20:25	W	400 m hurdles	Semi-Final
21:00	M	400 m	Semi-Final
21:30	W	1500 m	Final
21:42	M	3000 m steeplechase	Final
CEST Time	Field Events		
19:55	M	High Jump	Final
20:20	W	Discus Throw	Final
Wednesday, August 23, 2023
CEST Time	Track Events		
10:05	W	800 m	Prelim
11:20	W	200 m	Prelim
12:15	M	200 m	Prelim
19:00	W	5000 m	Prelim
19:53	W	3000 m steeplechase	Prelim
20:40	W	100 m hurdles	Semi-Final
21:15	M	1500 m	Final
21:35	W	400 m	Final
21:50	M	400 m hurdles	Final
CEST Time	Field Events		
10:15	M	Pole Vault	Prelim
10:20	W	Javelin Throw	Prelim (A)
11:15	M	Long Jump	Prelim
11:55	W	Javelin Throw	Prelim (B)
19:02	W	Hammer Throw	Prelim (A)
19:10	W	Triple Jump	Prelim
19:30	W	Pole Vault	Final
20:35	W	Hammer Throw	Prelim (B)
Thursday, August 24, 2023
CEST Time	Track Events		
7:00	M	35,000 m race walk	Final
7:00	W	35,000 m race walk	Final
19:00	M	5000 m	Prelim
19:45	W	200 m	Semi-Final
20:20	M	200 m	Semi-Final
20:50	M	800 m	Semi-Final
21:25	W	100 m hurdles	Final
21:35	M	400 m	Final
21:50	W	400 m hurdles	Final
CEST Time	Field Events		
19:30	M	Long Jump	Final
20:15	W	Hammer Throw	Final
Friday, August 25, 2023
CEST Time	Track Events		
10:05	M	100 m	Decathlon
19:30	M	4x100 m relay	Prelim
20:00	W	4x100 m relay	Prelim
20:25	W	800 m	Semi-Final
21:05	M	400 m	Decathlon
21:40	W	200 m	Final
21:50	M	200 m	Final
CEST Time	Field Events		
10:10	M	Javelin Throw	Prelim (A)
10:20	W	High Jump	Prelim
10:55	M	Long Jump	Decathlon
11:45	M	Javelin Throw	Prelim (B)
12:20	M	Shot Put	Decathlon
18:30	M	High Jump	Decathlon
19:35	W	Triple Jump	Final
20:20	W	Javelin Throw	Final
Saturday, August 26, 2023
CEST Time	Track Events		
7:00	W	Marathon	Final
10:05	M	110 m hurdles	Decathlon
19:30	M	4x400 m relay	Prelim
19:55	W	4x400 m relay	Prelim
20:30	M	800 m	Final
20:50	W	5000 m	Final
21:25	M	1500 m	Decathlon
21:40	M	4x100 m relay	Final
21:50	W	4x100 m relay	Final
CEST Time	Field Events		
10:25	W	Shot Put	Prelim
11:00	M	Discus Throw	Decathlon (A)
12:05	M	Discus Throw	Decathlon (B)
14:00	M	Pole Vault	Decathlon
19:05	M	Javelin Throw	Decathlon (A)
19:25	M	Pole Vault	Final
20:10	M	Javelin Throw	Decathlon (B)
20:15	W	Shot Put	Final
Sunday, August 27, 2023
CEST Time	Track Events		
7:00	M	Marathon	Final
20:10	M	5000 m	Final
20:45	W	800 m	Final
21:10	W	3000 m steeplechase	Final
21:37	M	4x400 m relay	Final
21:47	W	4x400 m relay	Final
CEST Time	Field Events		
20:05	W	High Jump	Final
20:20	M	Javelin Throw	Final

== Venue ==
The championships were held in the National Athletics Centre in Budapest, which was specially built for this event, and has a provisional capacity of 36,000.

== Mascot ==
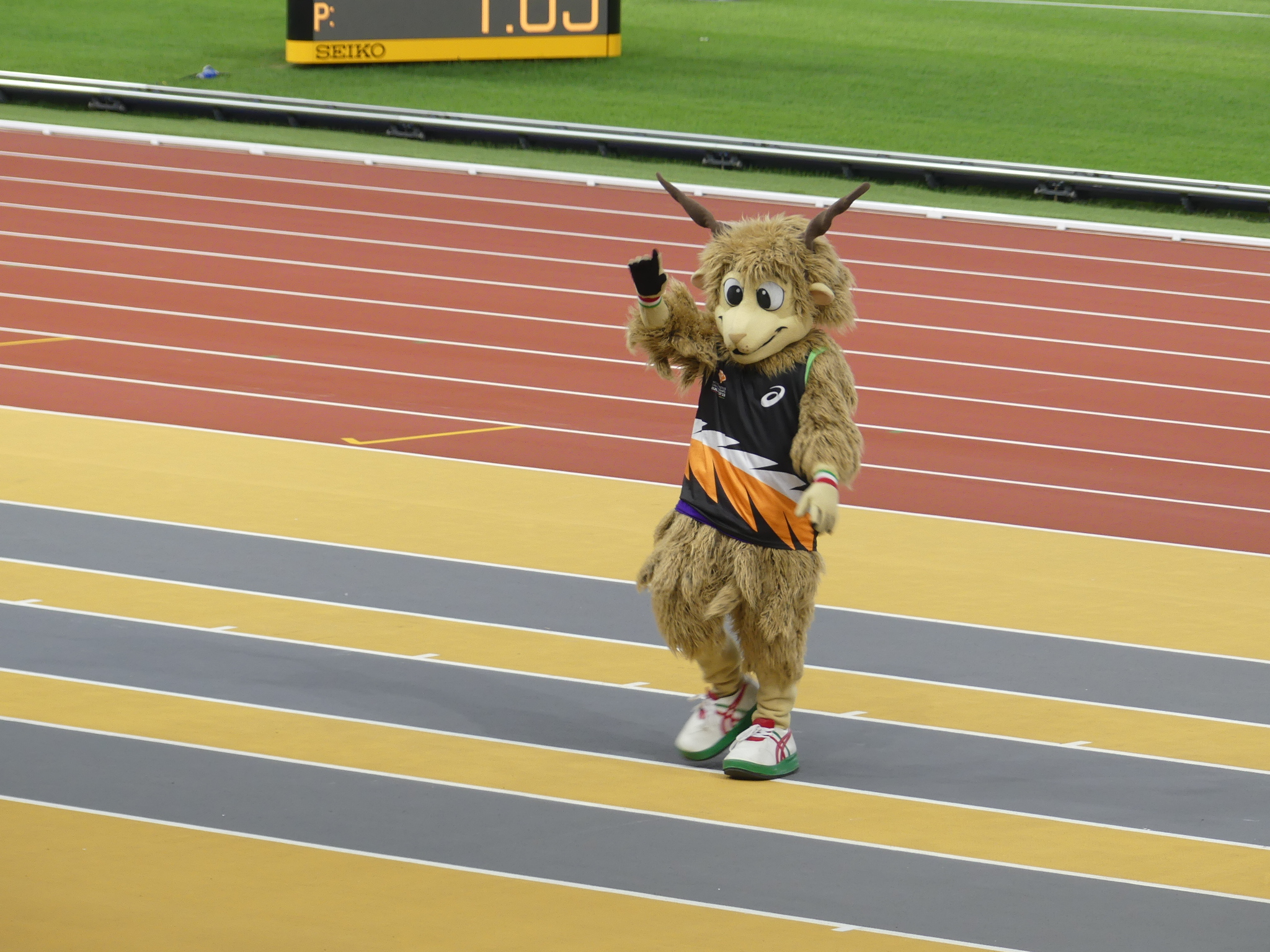
Youhoo, the official mascot of the Championships

The official mascot of the event is a Racka, called Youhuu.

== Entry standards ==
World Athletics announced that athletes would qualify by their World Athletics Rankings position, wild card (reigning world champion or 2022 Diamond League winner) or by achieving the entry standard.

To qualify as a Wild Card required fulfilling one of the following conditions:

- Reigning World Outdoor Champion
- Winner of the 2022 Diamond League
- By finishing position at designated competitions (Area competitions)
- Leader (as at closing date of the qualification period):
  - Hammer Throw 2022 World Athletics Continental Tour
  - World Athletics Challenge - Race Walking aka World Race Walking Tour
  - World Athletics Challenge - Combined Events aka World Combined Events Tour

Countries who had no male and/or no female athletes who had achieved the Entry Standard or considered as having achieved the entry standard or a qualified relay team, could enter one unqualified male athlete OR one unqualified female athlete in one event of the championships (except the road events and field events, combined events, 10,000 m and 3000 m steeplechase).

Since the postponement of the 2023 World Relays to 2024 Nassau, for Covid-pandemic reasons, a modified qualification system has been available for relay teams.

Event	Men	Quota	Women	Quota
100 metres	10.00	48	11.08	48
200 metres	20.16	48	22.60	48
400 metres	45.00	48	51.00	48
800 metres	1:44.70	56	1:59.80	56
1500 metres / Mile	3:34.20 / 3:51.00	56	4:03.50 / 4:22.00	56
5000 metres	13:07.00	42	14:57.00	42
10,000 metres / 10 km road	27:10.00	27	30:40.00	27
Marathon	2:09:40	100	2:28:00	100
3000 metres steeplechase	8:15.00	36	9:23.00	36
110/100 metres hurdles	13.28	40	12.78	40
400 metres hurdles	48.70	40	54.90	40
High jump	2.32	36	1.97	36
Pole vault	5.81	36	4.71	36
Long jump	8.25	36	6.85	36
Triple jump	17.20	36	14.52	36
Shot put	21.40	36	18.80	36
Discus throw	67.00	36	64.20	36
Hammer throw	78.00	36	73.60	36
Javelin throw	85.20	36	63.80	36
Decathlon / Heptathlon	8460	24	6480	24
20 kilometres race walk	1:20:10	50	1:29:20	50
35 kilometres race walk	2:29:40	50	2:51:30	50
4 × 100 metres relay	Top 8 at the 2022 World Athletics Championships + 8 from Top Lists	16	Top 8 at the 2022 World Athletics Championships + 8 from Top Lists	16
4 × 400 metres relay	Top 8 at the 2022 World Athletics Championships + 8 from Top Lists	16	Top 8 at the 2022 World Athletics Championships + 8 from Top Lists	16
4 × 400 metres relay mixed	Top 8 at the 2022 World Athletics Championships + 8 from Top Lists	16	Top 8 at the 2022 World Athletics Championships + 8 from Top Lists	16

=== Target numbers ===
At the end of the qualification period, the 2023 World Athletics Rankings were published. They were used to invite additional athletes to the World Championships where the target number of athletes had not been achieved for that event through other methods of qualification.

The maximum of three athletes per country in individual events was not affected by this rule. Member federations retained the right to confirm or reject athlete selections through this method.

Where the highest ranked athletes were from a country that already had three entrants for the event, or where member federations had rejected an entrant, the next highest ranked athlete became eligible for entry via the world rankings.

== Medal table ==
* Host nation (Hungary)

Rank	Nation	Gold	Silver	Bronze	Total
1	United States	12	8	9	29
2	Canada	4	2	0	6
3	Spain	4	1	0	5
4	Jamaica	3	5	4	12
5	Kenya	3	3	4	10
6	Ethiopia	2	4	3	9
7	Great Britain & N.I.	2	3	5	10
8	Netherlands	2	1	2	5
9	Norway	2	1	1	4
10	Sweden	2	1	0	3
11	Uganda	2	0	0	2
12	Australia	1	2	3	6
13	Italy	1	2	1	4
14	Ukraine	1	1	0	2
15	Greece	1	0	1	2
15	Japan	1	0	1	2
15	Morocco	1	0	1	2
18	Bahrain	1	0	0	1
18	Burkina Faso	1	0	0	1
18	Dominican Republic	1	0	0	1
18	India	1	0	0	1
18	Serbia	1	0	0	1
18	Venezuela	1	0	0	1
24	Poland	0	2	0	2
25	Cuba	0	1	2	3
26	Botswana	0	1	1	2
27	British Virgin Islands	0	1	0	1
27	Colombia	0	1	0	1
27	Ecuador	0	1	0	1
27	France	0	1	0	1
27	Israel	0	1	0	1
27	Pakistan	0	1	0	1
27	Peru	0	1	0	1
27	Philippines	0	1	0	1
27	Puerto Rico	0	1	0	1
27	Slovenia	0	1	0	1
37	China	0	0	2	2
37	Czech Republic	0	0	2	2
39	Barbados	0	0	1	1
39	Brazil	0	0	1	1
39	Finland	0	0	1	1
39	Grenada	0	0	1	1
39	Hungary*	0	0	1	1
39	Lithuania	0	0	1	1
39	Qatar	0	0	1	1
39	Romania	0	0	1	1
Totals (46 entries)		50	48	50	148

== Medal summary ==
=== Men ===
Event	Gold		Silver		Bronze	
100 metres	Noah Lyles; United States	9.83 =WL	Letsile Tebogo; Botswana	9.88 NR	Zharnel Hughes; Great Britain and Northern Ireland	9.88
200 metres	Noah Lyles; United States	19.52	Erriyon Knighton; United States	19.75	Letsile Tebogo; Botswana	19.81
400 metres	Antonio Watson; Jamaica	44.22	Matthew Hudson-Smith; Great Britain and Northern Ireland	44.31	Quincy Hall; United States	44.37 PB
800 metres	Marco Arop; Canada	1:44.24	Emmanuel Wanyonyi; Kenya	1:44.53	Ben Pattison; Great Britain and Northern Ireland	1:44.83
1500 metres	Josh Kerr; Great Britain and Northern Ireland	3:29.38 SB	Jakob Ingebrigtsen; Norway	3:29.65	Narve Gilje Nordås; Norway	3:29.68
5000 metres	Jakob Ingebrigtsen; Norway	13:11.30 SB	Mohamed Katir; Spain	13:11.44	Jacob Krop; Kenya	13:12.28
10,000 metres	Joshua Cheptegei; Uganda	27:51.42 SB	Daniel Ebenyo; Kenya	27:52.60	Selemon Barega; Ethiopia	27:52.72
4 × 100 metres relay	United States; Christian Coleman; Fred Kerley; Brandon Carnes; Noah Lyles; J.T. Smith*	37.38 WL	Italy; Roberto Rigali; Marcell Jacobs; Lorenzo Patta; Filippo Tortu	37.62 SB	Jamaica; Ackeem Blake; Oblique Seville; Ryiem Forde; Rohan Watson	37.76
4 × 400 metres relay	United States; Quincy Hall; Vernon Norwood; Justin Robinson; Rai Benjamin; Trevor Bassitt*; Matthew Boling*; Christopher Bailey*	2:57.31 WL	France; Ludvy Vaillant; Gilles Biron; David Sombé; Téo Andant; Loïc Prévot*	2:58.45 NR	Great Britain & N.I. Alex Haydock-Wilson; Charlie Dobson; Lewis Davey; Rio Mitcham	2:58.71 SB
110 metres hurdles	Grant Holloway; United States	12.96 SB	Hansle Parchment; Jamaica	13.07 SB	Daniel Roberts; United States	13.09
400 metres hurdles	Karsten Warholm; Norway	46.89	Kyron McMaster; British Virgin Islands	47.34	Rai Benjamin; United States	47.56
3000 metres steeplechase	Soufiane El Bakkali; Morocco	8:03.53	Lamecha Girma; Ethiopia	8:05.44	Abraham Kibiwot; Kenya	8:11.98
Marathon	Victor Kiplangat; Uganda	2:08.53	Maru Teferi; Israel	2:09.12 SB	Leul Gebresilase; Ethiopia	2:09.19
20 kilometres walk	Álvaro Martín; Spain	1:17:32 WL	Perseus Karlström; Sweden	1:17:39 NR	Caio Bonfim; Brazil	1:17:47 NR
35 kilometres walk	Álvaro Martín; Spain	2:24:30 NR	Brian Pintado; Ecuador	2:24:34 AR	Masatora Kawano; Japan	2:25:12 SB
High jump	Gianmarco Tamberi; Italy	2.36 m =WL	JuVaughn Harrison; United States	2.36 m =WL	Mutaz Essa Barshim; Qatar	2.33 m
Pole vault	Armand Duplantis; Sweden	6.10 m	EJ Obiena; Philippines	6.00 m =AR	Kurtis Marschall; Australia Chris Nilsen; United States	5.95 m =PB 5.95 m SB
Long jump	Miltiadis Tentoglou; Greece	8.52 m SB	Wayne Pinnock; Jamaica	8.50 m	Tajay Gayle; Jamaica	8.27 m =SB
Triple jump	Hugues Fabrice Zango; Burkina Faso	17.64 m	Lázaro Martínez; Cuba	17.41 m	Cristian Nápoles; Cuba	17.40 m PB
Shot put	Ryan Crouser; United States	23.51 m CR	Leonardo Fabbri; Italy	22.34 m PB	Joe Kovacs; United States	22.12 m
Discus throw	Daniel Ståhl; Sweden	71.46 m CR	Kristjan Čeh; Slovenia	70.02 m	Mykolas Alekna; Lithuania	68.85 m
Javelin throw	Neeraj Chopra; India	88.17 m	Arshad Nadeem; Pakistan	87.82 m SB	Jakub Vadlejch; Czech Republic	86.67 m
Hammer throw	Ethan Katzberg; Canada	81.25 m NR	Wojciech Nowicki; Poland	81.02 m	Bence Halász; Hungary	80.82 m SB
Decathlon	Pierce LePage; Canada	8909 WL	Damian Warner; Canada	8804 SB	Lindon Victor; Grenada	8756 NR
WR world record | AR area record | CR championship record | GR games record | NR national record | OR Olympic record | PB personal best | SB season best | WL world leading (in a given season)

* Indicates the athletes only competed in the preliminary heats and received medals

=== Women ===
Event	Gold		Silver		Bronze	
100 metres	Sha'Carri Richardson; United States	10.65 CR	Shericka Jackson; Jamaica	10.72	Shelly-Ann Fraser-Pryce; Jamaica	10.77 SB
200 metres	Shericka Jackson; Jamaica	21.41 CR	Gabrielle Thomas; United States	21.81	Sha'Carri Richardson; United States	21.92 PB
400 metres	Marileidy Paulino; Dominican Republic	48.76 NR	Natalia Kaczmarek; Poland	49.57	Sada Williams; Barbados	49.60
800 metres	Mary Moraa; Kenya	1:56.03 PB	Keely Hodgkinson; Great Britain and Northern Ireland	1:56.34	Athing Mu; United States	1:56.61 SB
1500 metres	Faith Kipyegon; Kenya	3:54.87	Diribe Welteji; Ethiopia	3:55.69	Sifan Hassan; Netherlands	3:56.00
5000 metres	Faith Kipyegon; Kenya	14:53.88	Sifan Hassan; Netherlands	14:54.11	Beatrice Chebet; Kenya	14:54.33
10,000 metres	Gudaf Tsegay; Ethiopia	31:27.18	Letesenbet Gidey; Ethiopia	31:28.16 SB	Ejgayehu Taye; Ethiopia	31:28.31
4 × 100 metres relay	United States; Tamari Davis; Twanisha Terry; Gabrielle Thomas; Sha'Carri Richardson; Tamara Clark*; Melissa Jefferson*	41.03 CR	Jamaica; Natasha Morrison; Shelly-Ann Fraser-Pryce; Shashalee Forbes; Shericka Jackson; Briana Williams*; Elaine Thompson-Herah*	41.21 SB	Great Britain & N.I. Asha Philip; Imani Lansiquot; Bianca Williams; Daryll Neita; Annie Tagoe*	41.98 SB
4 × 400 metres relay	Netherlands; Eveline Saalberg; Lieke Klaver; Cathelijn Peeters; Femke Bol; Lisanne de Witte*	3:20.72 WL, NR	Jamaica; Candice McLeod; Janieve Russell; Nickisha Pryce; Stacey-Ann Williams; Charokee Young*; Shiann Salmon*	3:20.88 SB	Great Britain & N.I. Laviai Nielsen; Amber Anning; Ama Pipi; Nicole Yeargin; Yemi Mary John*	3:21.04 SB
100 metres hurdles	Danielle Williams; Jamaica	12.43 SB	Jasmine Camacho-Quinn; Puerto Rico	12.44	Kendra Harrison; United States	12.46
400 metres hurdles	Femke Bol; Netherlands	51.70	Shamier Little; United States	52.80 SB	Rushell Clayton; Jamaica	52.81 PB
3000 metres steeplechase	Winfred Yavi; Bahrain	8:54.29 WL	Beatrice Chepkoech; Kenya	8:58.98 SB	Faith Cherotich; Kenya	9:00.69 PB
Marathon	Amane Beriso; Ethiopia	2:24:23 SB	Gotytom Gebreslase; Ethiopia	2:24:34 SB	Fatima Ezzahra Gardadi; Morocco	2:25:17
20 kilometres walk	María Pérez; Spain	1:26:51	Jemima Montag; Australia	1:27:16 AR	Antonella Palmisano; Italy	1:27:26 SB
35 kilometres walk	María Pérez; Spain	2:38:40 CR	Kimberly García; Peru	2:40:52	Antigoni Drisbioti; Greece	2:43:22 SB
High jump	Yaroslava Mahuchikh; Ukraine	2.01 m	Eleanor Patterson; Australia	1.99 m	Nicola Olyslagers; Australia	1.99 m
Pole vault	Nina Kennedy; Australia Katie Moon; United States	4.90 m =WL	Not awarded		Wilma Murto; Finland	4.80 m =SB
Long jump	Ivana Vuleta; Serbia	7.14 m WL	Tara Davis-Woodhall; United States	6.91 m	Alina Rotaru-Kottmann; Romania	6.88 m
Triple jump	Yulimar Rojas; Venezuela	15.08 m	Maryna Bekh-Romanchuk; Ukraine	15.00 m SB	Leyanis Pérez; Cuba	14.96 m
Shot put	Chase Ealey; United States	20.43 m SB	Sarah Mitton; Canada	20.08 m SB	Gong Lijiao; China	19.69 m
Discus throw	Laulauga Tausaga; United States	69.49 m PB	Valarie Allman; United States	69.23 m	Feng Bin; China	68.20 m SB
Hammer throw	Camryn Rogers; Canada	77.22 m	Janee' Kassanavoid; United States	76.36 m	DeAnna Price; United States	75.41 m
Javelin throw	Haruka Kitaguchi; Japan	66.73 m	Flor Ruiz; Colombia	65.47 m AR	Mackenzie Little; Australia	63.38 m
Heptathlon	Katarina Johnson-Thompson; Great Britain and Northern Ireland	6740	Anna Hall; United States	6720	Anouk Vetter; Netherlands	6501
WR world record | AR area record | CR championship record | GR games record | NR national record | OR Olympic record | PB personal best | SB season best | WL world leading (in a given season)

* Indicates the athletes only competed in the preliminary heats and received medals

=== Mixed ===
Event	Gold		Silver		Bronze	
4 × 400 metres relay	United States; Justin Robinson; Rosey Effiong; Matthew Boling; Alexis Holmes; Ryan Willie*	3:08.80 WR	Great Britain & N.I. Lewis Davey; Laviai Nielsen; Rio Mitcham; Yemi Mary John; Joseph Brier*	3:11.06 NR	Czech Republic; Matěj Krsek; Tereza Petržilková; Patrik Šorm; Lada Vondrová	3:11.98 NR

* Indicates the athletes only competed in the preliminary heats and received medals.

== Participating nations ==
According to an unofficial count there were 2001 athletes from 195 nations competing at the Championships out of 2187 athletes from 202 nations who had been originally entered.

- Afghanistan (1)
- Albania (2)
- Algeria (10)
- American Samoa (1)
- Andorra (1)
- Angola (1)
- Anguilla (1)
- Antigua and Barbuda (1)
- Argentina (10)
- Armenia (1)
- Aruba (1)
- Athlete Refugee Team (5)
- Australia (64)
- Austria (8)
- Azerbaijan (2)
- Bahamas (11)
- Bahrain (4)
- Bangladesh (1)
- Barbados (3)
- Belgium (29)
- Belize (1)
- Benin (1)
- Bermuda (1)
- Bolivia (1)
- Bosnia and Herzegovina (3)
- Botswana (12)
- Brazil (55)
- British Virgin Islands (3)
- Bulgaria (3)
- Burkina Faso (2)
- Burundi (6)
- Cameroon (3)
- Canada (50)
- Cape Verde (1)
- Cayman Islands (1)
- Chile (9)
- China (41)
- Chinese Taipei (4)
- Colombia (15)
- Comoros (1)
- Republic of the Congo (1)
- Cook Islands (1)
- Costa Rica (1)
- Croatia (8)
- Cuba (18)
- Cyprus (6)
- Czech Republic (22)
- Denmark (11)
- Djibouti (3)
- Dominica (1)
- Dominican Republic (2)
- Timor-Leste (1)
- Ecuador (17)
- Egypt (5)
- El Salvador (1)
- Equatorial Guinea (1)
- Eritrea (6)
- Estonia (7)
- Eswatini (1)
- Ethiopia (34)
- Federated States of Micronesia (1)
- Fiji (1)
- Finland (40)
- France (70)
- French Polynesia (1)
- Gabon (1)
- The Gambia (2)
- Georgia (1)
- Germany (65)
- Ghana (3)
- Gibraltar (1)
- Great Britain and Northern Ireland (53)
- Greece (21)
- Grenada (4)
- Guam (1)
- Guatemala (4)
- Guinea-Bissau (1)
- Guyana (2)
- Haiti (1)
- Honduras (1)
- Hong Kong (1)
- Hungary (57) (hosts)
- Iceland (3)
- India (25)
- Indonesia (1)
- Iran (2)
- Iraq (1)
- Ireland (24)
- Israel (4)
- Italy (72)
- Ivory Coast (5)
- Jamaica (66)
- Japan (72)
- Jordan (1)
- Kazakhstan (8)
- Kenya (50)
- Kiribati (1)
- Kosovo (1)
- Kuwait (3)
- Kyrgyzstan (2)
- Laos (1)
- Latvia (9)
- Lebanon (1)
- Lesotho (2)
- Liberia (3)
- Libya (1)
- Lithuania (16)
- Luxembourg (4)
- Macau (1)
- Madagascar (1)
- Malawi (1)
- Malaysia (1)
- Maldives (1)
- Mali (1)
- Malta (1)
- Marshall Islands (1)
- Mauritius (1)
- Mexico (24)
- Moldova (4)
- Monaco (1)
- Mongolia (4)
- Montenegro (1)
- Morocco (15)
- Mozambique (1)
- Myanmar (1)
- Namibia (3)
- Nauru (1)
- Nepal (1)
- Netherlands (37)
- New Zealand (19)
- Nicaragua (1)
- Niger (1)
- Nigeria (22)
- North Macedonia (1)
- Northern Mariana Islands (1)
- Norway (26)
- Oman (1)
- Pakistan (1)
- Palau (1)
- Palestine (1)
- Panama (2)
- Papua New Guinea (1)
- Paraguay (2)
- Peru (12)
- Philippines (3)
- Poland (61)
- Portugal (28)
- Puerto Rico (10)
- Qatar (3)
- Romania (16)
- Rwanda (3)
- Saint Kitts and Nevis (1)
- Saint Lucia (2)
- Saint Vincent and the Grenadines (1)
- Samoa (1)
- San Marino (1)
- São Tomé and Príncipe (1)
- Saudi Arabia (2)
- Senegal (2)
- Serbia (9)
- Singapore (2)
- Slovakia (9)
- Slovenia (12)
- Solomon Islands (1)
- Somalia (1)
- South Africa (35)
- South Korea (4)
- South Sudan (1)
- Spain (54)
- Sri Lanka (5)
- Sweden (32)
- Switzerland (33)
- Tajikistan (1)
- Tanzania (1)
- Thailand (1)
- Togo (1)
- Tonga (1)
- Trinidad and Tobago (12)
- Tunisia (4)
- Turkey (17)
- Turkmenistan (1)
- Turks and Caicos Islands (1)
- Tuvalu (1)
- Uganda (20)
- Ukraine (29)
- United States (134)
- Uruguay (5)
- Uzbekistan (4)
- Vanuatu (1)
- Venezuela (5)
- Vietnam (1)
- Virgin Islands (1)
- Yemen (1)
- Zambia (1)
- Zimbabwe (4)

== Media coverage ==
In the United States, television rights to the championships belong to NBC Sports.

Eurovision Sport and ESPN jointly hold and distribute World Athletics media rights in Europe and Africa for 2023. Warner Bros. Discovery has agreed with World Athletics rights-holders Eurovision Sport and ESPN to broadcast the nine-day event on its channels – Eurosport 1, Eurosport 2 and Eurosport App – including its platform Discovery+ on a non-exclusive basis in more than 45 countries across Europe, excluding the Nordics region – Denmark, Finland, Norway, Sweden. Streaming is available on Discovery+ in Austria, Germany, Italy, the Netherlands, UK and Ireland.

In India, live streaming is available on JioCinema.
