= 2023 World Athletics Championships – Women's heptathlon =

Women's heptathlon at the 2023 World Championships
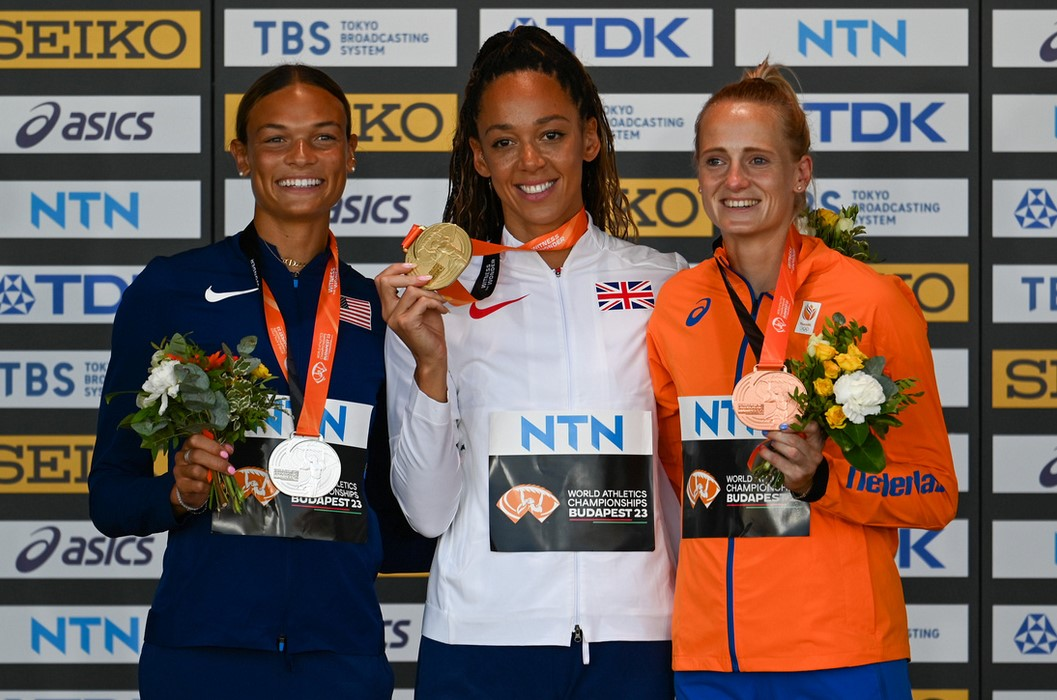
- Venue: National Athletics Centre
- Dates: 19–20 August

Medalists
| gold medal | Katarina Johnson-Thompson | Great Britain |
| silver medal | Anna Hall | United States |
| bronze medal | Anouk Vetter | Netherlands |

The women's heptathlon at the 2023 World Athletics Championships was held at the National Athletics Centre Budapest on 19 and 20 August 2023. The winning margin was 20 points which as of 2024 is the only time the heptathlon has been won by fewer than 40 points at these championships.

== Records ==
Before the competition records were as follows:

| Record | Athlete & Nat. | Perf. | Location | Date |
|---|---|---|---|---|
| World record | Jackie Joyner-Kersee (USA) | 7291 pts | Seoul, South Korea | 24 September 1988 |
| Championship record | Jackie Joyner-Kersee (USA) | 7128 pts | Rome, Italy | 1 September 1987 |
| World Leading | Anna Hall (USA) | 6988 pts | Götzis, Austria | 28 May 2023 |
| African Record | Margaret Simpson (GHA) | 6423 pts | Götzis, Austria | 29 May 2005 |
| Asian Record | Ghada Shouaa (SYR) | 6942 pts | Götzis, Austria | 26 May 1996 |
| North, Central American and Caribbean record | Jackie Joyner-Kersee (USA) | 7291 pts | Seoul, South Korea | 24 September 1988 |
| South American Record | Evelis Aguilar (COL) | 6346 pts | Ibagué, Colombia | 14 March 2021 |
| European Record | Carolina Klüft (SWE) | 7032 pts | Osaka, Japan | 26 August 2007 |
| Oceanian record | Jane Flemming (AUS) | 6695 pts | Auckland, New Zealand | 28 January 1990 |

For the current records in each discipline see Women's heptathlon.

The following records were set at the competition:

| Record | Discipline | Perf. | Athlete | Nat. | Date |
|---|---|---|---|---|---|
| Championship heptathlon best | Javelin | 59.57m | Anouk Vetter | NED | 20 Aug 2023 |
| Championship heptathlon best | 800 m | 2:04.09min | Anna Hall | USA | 20 Aug 2023 |

== Qualification standard ==
The standard to qualify automatically for entry was 6480 points.

== Schedule ==
The event schedule, in local time (UTC+2), was as follows:

| Date | Time | Round |
|---|---|---|
| 19 August | 11:35 | 100 metres hurdles |
| 19 August | 12:47 | High jump |
| 19 August | 19:05 | Shot put |
| 19 August | 20:31 | 200 metres |
| 20 August | 09:50 | Long jump |
| 20 August | 12:00 | Javelin throw |
| 20 August | 18:00 | 800 metres |

== Results ==
=== Final standings ===
The final standings were as follows:

The highest mark recorded in each event is highlighted in yellow.

| Rank | Athlete | Nationality | 100mh | HJ | SP | 200m | LJ | JT | 800m | Total | Notes |
|---|---|---|---|---|---|---|---|---|---|---|---|
| 1st place, gold medalist(s) | Katarina Johnson-Thompson | Great Britain & N.I. | 13.50 | 1.86 | 13.64 | 23.48 | 6.54 | 46.14 | 2:05.63 | 6740 | SB |
| 2nd place, silver medalist(s) | Anna Hall | United States | 12.97 | 1.83 | 14.54 | 23.56 | 6.19 | 44.88 | 2:04.09 | 6720 | |
| 3rd place, bronze medalist(s) | Anouk Vetter | Netherlands | 13.42 | 1.71 | 15.72 | 24.28 | 5.99 | 59.57 | 2:20.49 | 6501 | SB |
| 4 | Xénia Krizsán | Hungary | 13.48 | 1.77 | 14.18 | 25.16 | 6.30 | 51.23 | 2:08.93 | 6479 | SB |
| 5 | Emma Oosterwegel | Netherlands | 13.38 | 1.71 | 14.16 | 24.58 | 6.19 | 54.88 | 2:12.06 | 6464 | SB |
| 6 | Noor Vidts | Belgium | 13.33 | 1.80 | 14.40 | 24.23 | 6.35 | 41.00 | 2:09.48 | 6450 | SB |
| 7 | Sophie Weißenberg | Germany | 13.58 | 1.86 | 13.97 | 23.88 | 6.10 | 48.51 | 2:18.03 | 6438 | PB |
| 8 | Chari Hawkins | United States | 13.04 | 1.83 | 14.40 | 24.38 | 6.16 | 45.77 | 2:22.53 | 6366 | PB |
| 9 | Saga Vanninen | Finland | 13.62 | 1.80 | 14.78 | 24.71 | 6.06 | 48.32 | 2:20.13 | 6289 | |
| 10 | Rita Nemes | Hungary | 13.63 | 1.77 | 12.97 | 25.04 | 6.29 | 44.68 | 2:10.65 | 6232 | PB |
| 11 | Sofie Dokter | Netherlands | 13.82 | 1.80 | 13.16 | 23.89 | 6.09 | 44.46 | 2:17.98 | 6192 | |
| 12 | Auriana Lazraq-Khlass | France | 13.62 | 1.77 | 13.48 | 24.02 | 6.01 | 42.29 | 2:14.25 | 6179 | PB |
| 13 | Kate O'Connor | Ireland | 13.57 | 1.80 | 13.47 | 24.78 | 5.74 | 46.07 | 2:14.06 | 6145 | SB |
| 14 | Vanessa Grimm | Germany | 14.00 | 1.74 | 14.43 | 24.91 | 6.10 | 42.08 | 2:14.36 | 6088 | SB |
| 15 | Léonie Cambours | France | 13.56 | 1.74 | 13.39 | 25.03 | 6.09 | 39.07 | 2:19.34 | 5939 | SB |
| 16 | Ekaterina Voronina | Uzbekistan | 14.77 | 1.77 | 13.15 | 25.48 | 5.71 | 50.02 | 2:14.03 | 5922 | |
| 17 | Sarah Lagger | Austria | 14.21 | 1.77 | 13.78 | 25.86 | 5.85 | 43.79 | 2:15.32 | 5910 | |
| 18 | Esther Turpin | France | 13.24 | 1.77 | 12.79 | 25.04 | NM | 40.81 | 2:11.23 | 5256 | |
| | Martha Araújo | Colombia | 13.65 | 1.65 | 12.71 | 25.67 | 5.90 | 44.87 | DNS | DNF | |
| | Paulina Ligarska | Poland | 14.31 | 1.71 | 13.71 | 25.41 | 5.66 | 40.57 | DNS | DNF | |
| | Taliyah Brooks | United States | 12.78 | 1.80 | 13.45 | 23.85 | NM | DNF | | DNF | |
| | Carolin Schäfer | Germany | 13.60 | 1.77 | 13.98 | DNS | | | | DNF | |
| | Annik Kälin | Switzerland | 13.36 | 1.71 | DNS | | | | | DNF | |

=== 100 metres hurdles ===
The 100 metres hurdles event was started on 19 August at 11:35.

Wind:
Heat 1: -1.1 m/s, Heat 2: -0.2 m/s, Heat 3: +0.4 m/s

| Rank | Heat | Name | Nationality | Time | Points | Notes |
|---|---|---|---|---|---|---|
| 1 | 3 | Taliyah Brooks | United States | 12.78 | 1158 | SB |
| 2 | 3 | Anna Hall | United States | 12.97 | 1129 | |
| 3 | 3 | Chari Hawkins | United States | 13.04 | 1118 | PB |
| 4 | 3 | Esther Turpin | France | 13.24 | 1089 | SB |
| 5 | 1 | Noor Vidts | Belgium | 13.33 | 1075 | SB |
| 6 | 2 | Annik Kälin | Switzerland | 13:36 | 1071 | SB |
| 7 | 2 | Emma Oosterwegel | Netherlands | 13.38 | 1068 | SB |
| 8 | 3 | Anouk Vetter | Netherlands | 13.42 | 1062 | |
| 9 | 1 | Xénia Krizsán | Hungary | 13.48 | 1053 | SB |
| 10 | 3 | Katarina Johnson-Thompson | Great Britain & N.I. | 13.50 | 1050 | |
| 11 | 2 | Léonie Cambours | France | 13.56 | 1041 | SB |
| 12 | 1 | Kate O'Connor | Ireland | 13.57 | 1040 | PB |
| 13 | 2 | Sophie Weißenberg | Germany | 13.58 | 1039 | |
| 14 | 3 | Carolin Schäfer | Germany | 13.60 | 1036 | |
| 15 | 2 | Auriana Lazraq-Khlass | France | 13.62 | 1033 | |
| 16 | 3 | Saga Vanninen | Finland | 13.62 | 1033 | |
| 17 | 2 | Rita Nemes | Hungary | 13.63 | 1031 | |
| 18 | 2 | Martha Araújo | Colombia | 13.65 | 1028 | |
| 19 | 2 | Sofie Dokter | Netherlands | 13.82 | 1004 | |
| 20 | 1 | Vanessa Grimm | Germany | 14.00 | 978 | |
| 21 | 1 | Sarah Lagger | Austria | 14.21 | 949 | |
| 22 | 1 | Paulina Ligarska | Poland | 14.31 | 935 | |
| 23 | 1 | Ekaterina Voronina | Uzbekistan | 14.77 | 872 | |

=== High jump ===
The high jump event was started on 19 August at 12:46.

| Rnk | Grp | Athlete | Nationality | 1.56 | 1.59 | 1.62 | 1.65 | 1.68 | 1.71 | 1.74 | 1.77 | 1.80 | 1.83 | 1.86 | 1.89 | Res | Pts | Nts | Overall | |
| Rnk | Grp | Athlete | Nationality | 1.56 | 1.59 | 1.62 | 1.65 | 1.68 | 1.71 | 1.74 | 1.77 | 1.80 | 1.83 | 1.86 | 1.89 | Res | Pts | Nts | Pts | Rnk |
|---|---|---|---|---|---|---|---|---|---|---|---|---|---|---|---|---|---|---|---|---|
| 1 | A | Sophie Weißenberg | Germany | - | - | - | - | - | - | o | o | o | xxo | xo | xr- | 1.86 | 1054 | PB | 2093 | 5 |
| 2 | A | Katarina Johnson-Thompson | Great Britain & N.I. | - | - | - | - | - | - | - | o | xxo | xo | xxo | xxx | 1.86 | 1054 | | 2104 | 4 |
| 3 | A | Chari Hawkins | United States | - | - | - | - | - | o | o | o | xo | o | xxx | | 1.83 | 1016 | SB | 2134 | 3 |
| 3 | A | Anna Hall | United States | - | - | - | - | - | - | o | o | xo | o | xxx | | 1.83 | 1016 | | 2145 | 1 |
| 5 | A | Taliyah Brooks | United States | - | - | - | - | - | - | o | xo | o | xxx | | | 1.80 | 978 | | 2136 | 2 |
| 5 | A | Kate O'Connor | Ireland | - | - | - | o | o | o | o | xo | o | xxx | | | 1.80 | 978 | SB | 2018 | 8 |
| 7 | A | Noor Vidts | Belgium | - | - | - | - | o | o | xxo | o | xo | xxx | | | 1.80 | 978 | | 2053 | 6 |
| 8 | A | Saga Vanninen | Finland | - | - | - | - | o | o | xo | o | xxo | xxx | | | 1.80 | 978 | =PB | 2011 | 9 |
| 8 | A | Sofie Dokter | Netherlands | - | - | - | - | - | o | o | xo | xxo | xxx | | | 1.80 | 978 | | 1982 | 11 |
| 10 | A | Ekaterina Voronina | Uzbekistan | - | - | - | o | o | xo | o | o | xxx | | | | 1.77 | 941 | | 1813 | 22 |
| 10 | B | Auriana Lazraq-Khlass | France | - | - | o | o | o | xo | o | o | xxx | | | | 1.77 | 941 | =PB | 1974 | 13 |
| 12 | A | Rita Nemes | Hungary | - | - | - | o | o | xxo | o | o | | | | | 1.77 | 941 | | 1972 | 14 |
| 13 | B | Xénia Krizsán | Hungary | - | - | o | o | o | o | o | xo | xxx | | | | 1.77 | 941 | SB | 1994 | 10 |
| 13 | B | Carolin Schäfer | Germany | - | - | - | o | o | o | o | xo | xxx | | | | 1.77 | 941 | SB | 1977 | 12 |
| 15 | B | Sarah Lagger | Austria | - | - | - | o | o | o | o | xxo | xxx | | | | 1.77 | 941 | SB | 1890 | 19 |
| 15 | B | Esther Turpin | France | - | - | - | o | o | o | o | xxo | xxx | | | | 1.77 | 941 | SB | 2030 | 7 |
| 17 | B | Vanessa Grimm | Germany | - | - | o | o | o | xo | o | xxx | | | | | 1.74 | 903 | =SB | 1881 | 20 |
| 18 | A | Léonie Cambours | France | - | - | - | - | xo | xo | xxo | xxx | | | | | 1.74 | 903 | | 1944 | 15 |
| 19 | B | Anouk Vetter | Netherlands | - | - | - | xo | o | o | xxx | | | | | | 1.71 | 867 | =SB | 1929 | 18 |
| 19 | B | Annik Kälin | Switzerland | - | - | - | - | xo | o | xr- | | | | | | 1.71 | 867 | SB | 1938 | 16 |
| 21 | B | Paulina Ligarska | Poland | - | - | o | o | o | xo | xxx | | | | | | 1.71 | 867 | SB | 1802 | 23 |
| 21 | B | Emma Oosterwegel | Netherlands | - | - | o | o | o | xo | xxx | | | | | | 1.71 | 867 | SB | 1935 | 17 |
| 23 | B | Martha Araújo | Colombia | o | xo | o | o | xxx | | | | | | | | 1.65 | 795 | =SB | 1823 | 21 |

=== Shot put ===
The shot put event was started on 19 August at 19:07.

| Rank | Group | Name | Nationality | Round | | | Result | Points | Notes | Overall | |
| Rank | Group | Name | Nationality | 1 | 2 | 3 | Result | Points | Notes | Pts | Rank |
|---|---|---|---|---|---|---|---|---|---|---|---|
| 1 | A | Anouk Vetter | Netherlands | 15.38 | 15.72 | 15.08 | 15.72 | 909 | SB | 2838 | 8 |
| 2 | A | Saga Vanninen | Finland | 13.60 | 14.38 | 14.78 | 14.78 | 846 | | 2857 | 7 |
| 3 | A | Anna Hall | United States | 14.26 | 14.27 | 14.54 | 14.54 | 830 | PB | 2975 | 1 |
| 4 | A | Vanessa Grimm | Germany | 14.43 | 14.32 | 13.72 | 14.43 | 823 | | 2704 | 16 |
| 5 | A | Noor Vidts | Belgium | 13.96 | 13.92 | 14.40 | 14.40 | 821 | SB | 2874 | 6 |
| 6 | A | Chari Hawkins | United States | 14.40 | x | 13.69 | 14.40 | 821 | PB | 2955 | 2 |
| 7 | B | Xénia Krizsán | Hungary | 14.18 | 13.87 | 13.86 | 14.18 | 806 | SB | 2800 | 9 |
| 8 | A | Emma Oosterwegel | Netherlands | 14.16 | x | 14.10 | 14.16 | 805 | | 2740 | 13 |
| 9 | A | Carolin Schäfer | Germany | x | 13.98 | x | 13.98 | 793 | | 2770 | 11 |
| 10 | B | Sophie Weißenberg | Germany | x | 12.81 | 13.97 | 13.97 | 792 | SB | 2885 | 4 |
| 11 | A | Sarah Lagger | Austria | 12.93 | 13.78 | 13.39 | 13.78 | 779 | | 2669 | 19 |
| 12 | A | Paulina Ligarska | Poland | 13.69 | x | 13.71 | 13.71 | 775 | | 2577 | 20 |
| 13 | B | Katarina Johnson-Thompson | Great Britain & N.I. | 13.64 | 13.36 | 13.14 | 13.64 | 770 | | 2874 | 5 |
| 14 | B | Auriana Lazraq-Khlass | France | 12.44 | 12.85 | 13.48 | 13.48 | 759 | | 2733 | 14 |
| 15 | A | Kate O'Connor | Ireland | 13.47 | 13.19 | 13.41 | 13.47 | 759 | | 2777 | 10 |
| 16 | B | Taliyah Brooks | United States | 12.85 | 13.45 | 13.04 | 13.45 | 757 | PB | 2893 | 3 |
| 17 | B | Léonie Cambours | France | 13.39 | x | x | 13.39 | 753 | | 2697 | 18 |
| 18 | B | Sofie Dokter | Netherlands | 12.43 | 12.82 | 13.16 | 13.16 | 738 | | 2720 | 15 |
| 19 | B | Ekaterina Voronina | Uzbekistan | 12.31 | 13.15 | x | 13.15 | 737 | | 2550 | 21 |
| 20 | B | Rita Nemes | Hungary | 12.97 | 12.23 | 12.79 | 12.97 | 725 | | 2697 | 17 |
| 21 | B | Esther Turpin | France | 12.79 | 12.76 | x | 12.79 | 713 | | 2743 | 12 |
| 22 | B | Martha Araújo | Colombia | 12.71 | 12.61 | 12.10 | 12.71 | 708 | | 2531 | 22 |
| | A | Annik Kälin | Switzerland | | | | DNS | | | DNF | |

=== 200 metres ===
The 200 metres event was started on 19 August at 20:40.

Wind:
Heat 1: -0.1 m/s, Heat 2: -0.1 m/s, Heat 3: 0.0 m/s

| Rank | Heat | Athlete | Nationality | Result | Points | Notes | Overall | |
| Rank | Heat | Athlete | Nationality | Result | Points | Notes | Pts | Rank |
|---|---|---|---|---|---|---|---|---|
| 1 | 3 | Katarina Johnson-Thompson | Great Britain & N.I. | 23.48 | 1031 | | 3905 | 2 |
| 2 | 3 | Anna Hall | United States | 23.56 | 1023 | | 3998 | 1 |
| 3 | 3 | Taliyah Brooks | United States | 23.85 | 995 | | 3888 | 4 |
| 4 | 3 | Sophie Weißenberg | Germany | 23.88 | 992 | | 3877 | 5 |
| 5 | 3 | Sofie Dokter | Netherlands | 23.89 | 991 | | 3711 | 10 |
| 6 | 2 | Auriana Lazraq-Khlass | France | 24.02 | 979 | PB | 3712 | 9 |
| 7 | 1 | Noor Vidts | Belgium | 24.23 | 959 | SB | 3833 | 6 |
| 8 | 3 | Anouk Vetter | Netherlands | 24.28 | 954 | | 3792 | 7 |
| 9 | 3 | Chari Hawkins | United States | 24.38 | 945 | | 3900 | 3 |
| 10 | 2 | Emma Oosterwegel | Netherlands | 24.58 | 926 | | 3666 | 13 |
| 11 | 2 | Saga Vanninen | Finland | 24.71 | 914 | | 3771 | 8 |
| 12 | 2 | Kate O'Connor | Ireland | 24.78 | 907 | SB | 3684 | 11 |
| 13 | 2 | Vanessa Grimm | Germany | 24.91 | 895 | | 3599 | 15 |
| 14 | 1 | Léonie Cambours | France | 25.03 | 884 | SB | 3581 | 16 |
| 15 | 2 | Esther Turpin | France | 25.04 | 883 | | 3626 | 14 |
| 16 | 2 | Rita Nemes | Hungary | 25.04 | 883 | | 3580 | 17 |
| 17 | 1 | Xénia Krizsán | Hungary | 25.16 | 872 | SB | 3672 | 12 |
| 18 | 2 | Paulina Ligarska | Poland | 25.41 | 850 | | 3427 | 19 |
| 19 | 1 | Ekaterina Voronina | Uzbekistan | 25.48 | 843 | | 3393 | 20 |
| 20 | 1 | Martha Araújo | Colombia | 25.67 | 826 | | 3357 | 21 |
| 21 | 1 | Sarah Lagger | Austria | 25.86 | 809 | | 3478 | 18 |
| | 3 | Carolin Schäfer | Germany | DNS | | | DNF | |

=== Long jump ===
The long jump event was started on 20 August at 09:50.

| Rank | Group | Name | Nationality | Round | | | Result | Points | Notes | Overall | |
| Rank | Group | Name | Nationality | 1 | 2 | 3 | Result | Points | Notes | Pts | Rank |
|---|---|---|---|---|---|---|---|---|---|---|---|
| 1 | B | Katarina Johnson-Thompson | Great Britain & N.I. | 6.37 | 6.45 | 6.54 | 6.54 | 1020 | | 4925 | 1 |
| 2 | B | Noor Vidts | Belgium | 6.13 | 6.35 | 6.27 | 6.35 | 959 | | 4792 | 4 |
| 3 | A | Xénia Krizsán | Hungary | 5.87 | 6.30 | - | 6.30 | 943 | SB | 4615 | 8 |
| 4 | B | Rita Nemes | Hungary | 6.29 | 6.11 | - | 6.29 | 940 | | 4520 | 12 |
| 5 | B | Anna Hall | United States | 6.18 | 6.19 | 6.13 | 6.19 | 908 | | 4906 | 2 |
| 6 | B | Emma Oosterwegel | Netherlands | 6.19 | x | x | 6.19 | 908 | | 4574 | 10 |
| 7 | A | Chari Hawkins | United States | x | 5.83 | 6.16 | 6.16 | 899 | SB | 4799 | 3 |
| 8 | B | Sophie Weißenberg | Germany | 5.95 | 6.09 | 6.10 | 6.10 | 880 | | 4757 | 5 |
| 9 | B | Vanessa Grimm | Germany | 5.90 | x | 6.10 | 6.10 | 880 | | 4479 | 13 |
| 10 | B | Léonie Cambours | France | 5.87 | 6.09 | x | 6.09 | 877 | | 4458 | 14 |
| 11 | A | Sofie Dokter | Netherlands | 6.09 | x | x | 6.09 | 877 | | 4588 | 9 |
| 12 | B | Saga Vanninen | Finland | 5.98 | 6.06 | x | 6.06 | 868 | | 4639 | 6 |
| 13 | A | Auriana Lazraq-Khlass | France | 5.99 | 5.95 | 6.01 | 6.01 | 853 | | 4565 | 11 |
| 14 | B | Anouk Vetter | Netherlands | x | x | 5.99 | 5.99 | 846 | | 4638 | 7 |
| 15 | A | Martha Araújo | Colombia | 5.90 | x | x | 5.90 | 819 | | 4176 | 17 |
| 16 | A | Sarah Lagger | Austria | 5.82 | x | 5.85 | 5.85 | 804 | | 4282 | 16 |
| 17 | A | Kate O'Connor | Ireland | 5.74 | x | x | 5.74 | 771 | | 4455 | 15 |
| 18 | A | Ekaterina Voronina | Uzbekistan | 5.71 | x | 5.70 | 5.71 | 762 | | 4155 | 19 |
| 19 | A | Paulina Ligarska | Poland | 5.66 | x | 5.58 | 5.66 | 747 | | 4174 | 18 |
| | A | Esther Turpin | France | x | x | x | NM | | | DNF | |
| | B | Taliyah Brooks | United States | x | x | x | NM | | | DNF | |

=== Javelin throw ===
The javelin throw event was started on 20 August at 13:05.

| Rank | Group | Name | Nationality | Round | | | Result | Points | Notes | Overall | |
| Rank | Group | Name | Nationality | 1 | 2 | 3 | Result | Points | Notes | Pts | Rank |
|---|---|---|---|---|---|---|---|---|---|---|---|
| 1 | B | Anouk Vetter | Netherlands | 57.45 | 53.19 | 59.57 | 59.57 | 1046 | CHB | 5684 | 2 |
| 2 | B | Emma Oosterwegel | Netherlands | 52.48 | 54.88 | 50.75 | 54.88 | 955 | SB | 5529 | 6 |
| 3 | B | Xénia Krizsán | Hungary | 50.20 | 51.23 | 43.35 | 51.23 | 884 | SB | 5499 | 7 |
| 4 | B | Ekaterina Voronina | Uzbekistan | 46.55 | 50.02 | x | 50.02 | 861 | | 5016 | 17 |
| 5 | B | Sophie Weißenberg | Germany | 45.88 | 48.51 | x | 48.51 | 831 | SB | 5588 | 4 |
| 6 | B | Saga Vanninen | Finland | 48.32 | 44.05 | 47.47 | 48.32 | 828 | SB | 5467 | 9 |
| 7 | B | Katarina Johnson-Thompson | Great Britain & N.I. | 41.83 | 46.14 | 44.69 | 46.14 | 785 | PB | 5710 | 1 |
| 8 | B | Kate O'Connor | Ireland | 45.73 | 46.07 | - | 46.07 | 784 | | 5239 | 13 |
| 9 | A | Chari Hawkins | United States | x | 45.77 | 43.77 | 45.77 | 778 | PB | 5577 | 5 |
| 10 | B | Anna Hall | United States | x | 37.92 | 44.88 | 44.88 | 761 | SB | 5667 | 3 |
| 11 | B | Martha Araújo | Colombia | x | 42.97 | 44.87 | 44.87 | 761 | | 4937 | 18 |
| 12 | A | Rita Nemes | Hungary | 41.83 | 44.68 | 42.18 | 44.68 | 757 | SB | 5277 | 11 |
| 13 | A | Sofie Dokter | Netherlands | 43.04 | 39.74 | 44.46 | 44.46 | 753 | PB | 5341 | 10 |
| 14 | B | Sarah Lagger | Austria | 41.32 | 42.16 | 43.79 | 43.79 | 740 | | 5022 | 16 |
| 15 | A | Auriana Lazraq-Khlass | France | 42.29 | 33.86 | 36.05 | 42.29 | 711 | | 5276 | 12 |
| 16 | A | Vanessa Grimm | Germany | 35.43 | 42.08 | - | 42.08 | 707 | SB | 5186 | 14 |
| 17 | A | Noor Vidts | Belgium | 41.00 | 40.18 | 39.79 | 41.00 | 686 | SB | 5478 | 8 |
| 18 | A | Esther Turpin | France | 40.81 | x | 38.21 | 40.81 | 683 | | 4309 | 20 |
| 19 | A | Paulina Ligarska | Poland | x | 35.32 | 40.57 | 40.57 | 678 | | 4852 | 19 |
| 20 | A | Léonie Cambours | France | 38.72 | 39.07 | 36.14 | 39.07 | 649 | PB | 5107 | 15 |

=== 800 metres ===
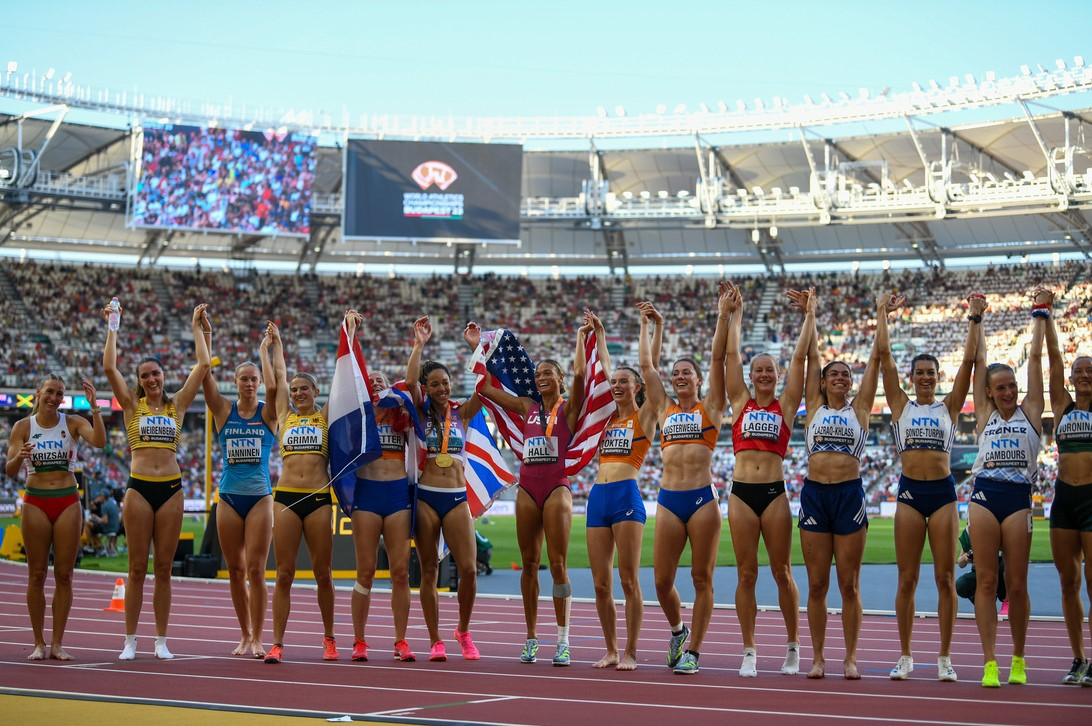
The heptathletes after finishing the competition

The 800 metres event was started on 20 August at 18:00.

| Rank | Heat | Athlete | Nationality | Result | Points | Notes | Overall | |
| Rank | Heat | Athlete | Nationality | Result | Points | Notes | Pts | Rank |
|---|---|---|---|---|---|---|---|---|
| 1 | 2 | Anna Hall | United States | 2:04.09 | 1053 | CHB | 6720 | 2 |
| 2 | 2 | Katarina Johnson-Thompson | Great Britain & N.I. | 2:05.63 | 1030 | PB | 6740 | 1 |
| 3 | 2 | Xénia Krizsán | Hungary | 2:08.93 | 980 | SB | 6479 | 4 |
| 4 | 2 | Noor Vidts | Belgium | 2:09.48 | 972 | SB | 6450 | 6 |
| 5 | 1 | Rita Nemes | Hungary | 2:10.65 | 955 | | 6232 | 10 |
| 6 | 1 | Esther Turpin | France | 2:11.23 | 947 | PB | 5256 | 18 |
| 7 | 2 | Emma Oosterwegel | Netherlands | 2:12.06 | 935 | SB | 6464 | 5 |
| 8 | 1 | Ekaterina Voronina | Uzbekistan | 2:14.03 | 906 | SB | 5922 | 16 |
| 9 | 1 | Kate O'Connor | Ireland | 2:14.06 | 906 | SB | 6145 | 13 |
| 10 | 1 | Auriana Lazraq-Khlass | France | 2:14.25 | 903 | | 6179 | 12 |
| 11 | 1 | Vanessa Grimm | Germany | 2:14.36 | 902 | | 6088 | 14 |
| 12 | 1 | Sarah Lagger | Austria | 2:15.32 | 888 | | 5910 | 17 |
| 13 | 2 | Sofie Dokter | Netherlands | 2:17.98 | 851 | | 6192 | 11 |
| 14 | 2 | Sophie Weißenberg | Germany | 2:18.03 | 850 | SB | 6438 | 7 |
| 15 | 1 | Léonie Cambours | France | 2:19.34 | 832 | | 5939 | 15 |
| 16 | 2 | Saga Vanninen | Finland | 2:20.13 | 822 | | 6289 | 9 |
| 17 | 2 | Anouk Vetter | Netherlands | 2:20.49 | 817 | SB | 6501 | 3 |
| 18 | 2 | Chari Hawkins | United States | 2:22.53 | 789 | | 6366 | 8 |
| | 1 | Martha Araújo | Colombia | DNS | | | DNF | |
| | 1 | Paulina Ligarska | Poland | DNS | | | DNF | |
