= France at the 2023 World Athletics Championships =

- Flag of France
- WA code: FRA

in Budapest, Hungary 19 August 2023 – 27 August 2023
- Competitors: 78 (42 men and 36 women)
- Medals Ranked 27th: Gold 0 Silver 1 Bronze 0 Total 1

World Athletics Championships appearances (overview)
- 1976; 1980; 1983; 1987; 1991; 1993; 1995; 1997; 1999; 2001; 2003; 2005; 2007; 2009; 2011; 2013; 2015; 2017; 2019; 2022; 2023; 2025

France competed at the 2023 World Athletics Championships in Budapest, Hungary, from 19 to 27 August 2023.

== Medallists ==
| Medal | Name | Event | Date |
|---|---|---|---|
| Silver | Téo Andant; Gilles Biron; Loïc Prévot*; David Sombe; Ludvy Vaillant | Men's 4 × 400 metres relay | 27 August |

* – Indicates the athlete competed in preliminaries but not the final

== Results ==
France entered 78 athletes.

Key

- Q = Qualified for the next round
- q = Qualified for the next round as a fastest loser or, in field events, by position without achieving the qualifying target
- NR = National record
- PB = Personal best
- SB = Season best
- N/A = Round not applicable for the event

=== Men ===
Track and road events

| Athlete | Event | Heat | | Semifinal | | Final | |
| Athlete | Event | Result | Rank | Result | Rank | Result | Rank |
|---|---|---|---|---|---|---|---|
| Mouhamadou Fall | 100 metres | 10.19 | 4 | Did not advance | | | |
| Ryan Zeze | 200 metres | DQ | | Did not advance | | | |
| Yanis Meziane | 800 metres | 1:45.30 | 3 Q | 1:44.30 PB | 4 | Did not advance | |
| Benjamin Robert | 800 metres | 1:46.45 | 1 Q | 1:44.38 | 6 | Did not advance | |
| Gabriel Tual | 800 metres | 1:45.10 | 2 Q | 1:44.83 | 5 | Did not advance | |
| Azeddine Habz | 1500 metres | 3:35.16 | 6 Q | 3:32.79 | 4 Q | 3:33.14 | 11 |
| Julian Ranc | 1500 metres | 3:48.63 | 14 | Did not advance | | | |
| Jimmy Gressier | 5000 metres | 13:36.42 | 6 Q | —N/a | | 13:17.20 | 9 |
| Hugo Hay | 5000 metres | 13:39.76 | 14 | —N/a | | Did not advance | |
| Yann Schrub | 10,000 metres | —N/a | | | | 28:07.42 SB | 9 |
| Morhad Amdouni | Marathon | —N/a | | | | DNF | |
| Hassan Chahdi | Marathon | —N/a | | | | 2:10:45 SB | 7 |
| Mehdi Frère | Marathon | —N/a | | | | 2:11:59 | 18 |
| Wilhem Belocian | 110 metres hurdles | 13.31 | 1 Q | 13.23 | 3 q | 13.32 | 8 |
| Just Kwaou-Mathey | 110 metres hurdles | 13.42 | 5 q | 13.31 | 3 | Did not advance | |
| Sasha Zhoya | 110 metres hurdles | 13.35 | 3 Q | 13.15 PB | 2 Q | 13.26 | 6 |
| Wilfried Happio | 400 metres hurdles | 48.63 | 1 Q | 48.83 | 7 | Did not advance | |
| Ludvy Vaillant | 400 metres hurdles | 48.27 | 2 Q | 48.48 | 3 | Did not advance | |
| Djilali Bedrani | 3000 metres steeplechase | 8:20.69 | 7 | —N/a | | Did not advance | |
| Gabriel Bordier | 20 kilometres walk | —N/a | | | | 1:18:59 PB | 10 |
| Kévin Campion | 35 kilometres walk | —N/a | | | | 2:30:18 SB | 14 |
| Aurélien Quinion | 35 kilometres walk | —N/a | | | | DQ | |
| Mouhamadou Fall; Pablo Matéo; Méba-Mickaël Zeze; Ryan Zeze | 4 × 100 metres relay | 37.98 SB | 4 q | —N/a | | 38.06 | 6 |
| Téo Andant; Gilles Biron; Loïc Prévot*; David Sombe; Ludvy Vaillant | 4 × 400 metres relay | 3:00.05 SB | 2 Q | —N/a | | 2:58.45 NR | 2nd place, silver medalist(s) |

Field events

| Athlete | Event | Qualification | | Final | |
| Athlete | Event | Distance | Position | Distance | Position |
|---|---|---|---|---|---|
| Thibaut Collet | Pole vault | 5.75 | =6 q | 5.90 PB | 5 |
| Ethan Cormont | Pole vault | 5.55 | =20 | Did not advance | |
| Baptiste Thiery | Pole vault | 5.70 | 19 | Did not advance | |
| Jules Pommery | Long jump | 7.23 | 37 | Did not advance | |
| Enzo Hodebar | Triple jump | 16.17 | 25 | Did not advance | |
| Jean-Marc Pontvianne | Triple jump | 16.64 | 14 | Did not advance | |
| Fred Moudani-Likibi | Shot put | 18.88 | 32 | Did not advance | |
| Yann Chaussinand | Hammer throw | 72.17 | 23 | Did not advance | |
| Felise Vaha'i Sosaia | Javelin throw | 74.80 | 28 | Did not advance | |

Combined events – Decathlon

| Athlete | Event | 100 m | LJ | SP | HJ | 400 m | 110H | DT | PV | JT | 1500 m | Final | Rank |
|---|---|---|---|---|---|---|---|---|---|---|---|---|---|
| Kevin Mayer | Result | 10.79 | 7.25 | DNF | | | | | | | | | |
| Kevin Mayer | Points | 908 | 874 | DNF | | | | | | | | | |

=== Women ===
Track and road events

| Athlete | Event | Heat | | Semifinal | | Final | |
| Athlete | Event | Result | Rank | Result | Rank | Result | Rank |
|---|---|---|---|---|---|---|---|
| Amandine Brossier | 400 metres | 51.98 SB | 5 | Did not advance | | | |
| Léna Kandissounon | 800 metres | 2:00.81 | 5 | Did not advance | | | |
| Rénelle Lamote | 800 metres | 2:00.22 | 3 Q | 2:01.25 | 6 | Did not advance | |
| Agnès Raharolahy | 800 metres | 2:01.93 | 8 | Did not advance | | | |
| Agathe Guillemot | 1500 metres | 4:06.18 | 8 | Did not advance | | | |
| Laëticia Bapté | 100 metres hurdles | 12.93 | 5 | Did not advance | | | |
| Cyréna Samba-Mayela | 100 metres hurdles | 12.71 | 4 Q | 12.95 | 5 | Did not advance | |
| Alice Finot | 3000 metres steeplechase | 9:20.27 | 4 Q | —N/a | | 9:06.15 NR | 5 |
| Flavie Renouard | 3000 metres steeplechase | 9:39.91 | 9 | —N/a | | Did not advance | |
| Clémence Beretta | 20 kilometres walk | —N/a | | | | 1:30:43 | 16 |
| Camille Moutard | 20 kilometres walk | —N/a | | | | 1:32:18 | 21 |
| Pauline Stey | 20 kilometres walk | —N/a | | | | 1:31:20 | 18 |
| Gémima Joseph; Mallory Leconte; Helene Parisot; Carolle Zahi | 4 × 100 metres relay | 43.12 SB | 7 | —N/a | | Did not advance | |
| Amandine Brossier; Louise Maraval; Camille Seri; Sounkamba Sylla; Marjorie Veyssiere | 4 × 400 metres relay | 3:27.50 SB | 5 qR | —N/a | | 3:28.35 | 9 |

Field events

| Athlete | Event | Qualification | | Final | |
| Athlete | Event | Distance | Position | Distance | Position |
|---|---|---|---|---|---|
| Solène Gicquel | High jump | 1.89 | =12 q | 1.85 | 15 |
| Nawal Meniker | High jump | 1.89 | =12 q | 1.90 | 12 |
| Marie-Julie Bonnin | Pole vault | 4.35 | 29 | Did not advance | |
| Ninon Chapelle | Pole vault | 4.60 SB | 14 | Did not advance | |
| Margot Chevrier | Pole vault | 4.50 | 21 | Did not advance | |
| Hilary Kpatcha | Long jump | NM | | Did not advance | |
| Mélina Robert-Michon | Discus throw | 61.82 | 11 q | 63.46 | 9 |
| Rose Loga | Hammer throw | 67.95 | 24 | Did not advance | |
| Alexandra Tavernier | Hammer throw | 70.19 | 17 | Did not advance | |

Combined events – Heptathlon

| Athlete | Event | 100H | HJ | SP | 200 m | LJ | JT | 800 m | Final | Rank |
|---|---|---|---|---|---|---|---|---|---|---|
| Léonie Cambours | Result | 13.56 | 1.74 | 13.39 | 25.03 | 6.09 | 39.07 | 2:19.34 | 5939 | 15 |
| Léonie Cambours | Points | 1041 | 903 | 753 | 884 | 877 | 649 | 832 | 5939 | 15 |
| Auriana Lazraq-Khlass | Result | 13.62 | 1.77 | 13.48 | 24.02 | 6.01 | 42.29 | 2:14.25 | 6179 | 12 |
| Auriana Lazraq-Khlass | Points | 1033 | 941 | 759 | 979 | 853 | 711 | 903 | 6179 | 12 |
| Esther Turpin | Result | 13.24 | 1.77 | 12.79 | 25.04 | NM | 40.81 | 2:11.23 | 5256 | 18 |
| Esther Turpin | Points | 1089 | 941 | 713 | 883 | 0 | 683 | 947 | 5256 | 18 |

=== Mixed ===
Track events

| Athlete | Event | Heat | | Final | |
| Athlete | Event | Result | Rank | Result | Rank |
|---|---|---|---|---|---|
| Téo Andant; Gilles Biron; Amandine Brossier; Louise Maraval | 4 × 400 metres relay | 3:12.25 NR | 5 Q | 3:12.99 | 4 |
