= Hungary at the 2023 World Athletics Championships =

- Flag of Hungary
- WA code: HUN

in Budapest, Hungary 19 August 2023 – 27 August 2023
- Competitors: 63 (29 men and 34 women)
- Medals Ranked 18th: Gold 0 Silver 0 Bronze 1 Total 1

World Athletics Championships appearances (overview)
- 1976; 1980; 1983; 1987; 1991; 1993; 1995; 1997; 1999; 2001; 2003; 2005; 2007; 2009; 2011; 2013; 2015; 2017; 2019; 2022; 2023

Hungary competed at the 2023 World Athletics Championships in Budapest, Hungary, from 19 to 27 August 2023.

== Medalists ==
Medal	Athlete	Event	Date
Bronze	Bence Halász	Men's hammer throw	August 20

== Results ==
Hungary entered 63 athletes.

Key

- Q = Qualified for the next round
- q = Qualified for the next round as a fastest loser or, in field events, by position without achieving the qualifying target
- NR = National record
- PB = Personal best
- SB = Season best
- N/A = Round not applicable for the event

=== Men ===
Track and road events

Athlete	Event	Preliminary		Heat		Semifinal		Final	
Athlete	Event	Result	Rank	Result	Rank	Result	Rank	Result	Rank
Bence Boros	100 metres	10.70	2 Q	10.70	8	Did not advance			
Zoltán Wahl	200 metres	—		20.90 PB	=5	Did not advance			
Attila Molnár	400 metres	—		44.84 NR	3 Q	45.02	6	Did not advance	
Dániel Huller	800 metres	—		1:47.41	7	Did not advance			
Balázs Vindics	800 metres	—		1:47.18	5	Did not advance			
István Szögi	1500 metres	—		3:37.57	11	Did not advance			
Ferenc Soma Kovács	5000 metres	—		14:11.99	21	—		Did not advance	
Levente Szemerei	Marathon	—						2:17:20	40
Bálint Szeles	110 metres hurdles	—		13.77	8	Did not advance			
Árpád Bánóczy	400 metres hurdles	—		50.31 PB	8	Did not advance			
István Palkovits	3000 metres steeplechase	—		8:29.37	7	—		Did not advance	
Máté Helebrandt	20 kilometres walk	—						1:21.16 PB	23
Bence Venyercsán	35 kilometres walk	—						2:40:34	30
Bence Boros; Dominik Illovszky; Márk Pap; Dániel Szabó	4 × 100 metres relay	—		39.55	6	—		Did not advance	
Árpád Kovács; Attila Molnár; Ernő Steigerwald; Zoltán Wahl	4 × 400 metres relay	—		3:02.65	9	—		Did not advance	

Field events

Athlete	Event	Qualification		Final	
Athlete	Event	Distance	Position	Distance	Position
Gergely Török	High jump	2.14	32	Did not advance	
Mátyás Németh	Long jump	7.79 =PB	19	Did not advance	
Dániel Szenderffy	Triple jump	15.38	30	Did not advance	
Balázs Tóth	Shot put	17.37	35	Did not advance	
Róbert Szikszai	Discus throw	60.64	30	Did not advance	
Bence Halász	Hammer throw	78.13	3 Q	80.82 SB	3rd place, bronze medalist(s)
Dániel Rába	Hammer throw	73.17 SB	15	Did not advance	
Donát Varga	Hammer throw	72.02	25	Did not advance	
György Herczeg	Javelin throw	76.18	23	Did not advance	

=== Women ===
Track and road events

Athlete	Event	Heat		Semifinal		Final	
Athlete	Event	Result	Rank	Result	Rank	Result	Rank
Boglárka Takács	100 metres	11.18	3 Q	11.26	8	Did not advance	
Boglárka Takács	200 metres	23.24	4	Did not advance			
Alexa Sulyán	200 metres	23.47	6	Did not advance			
Fanni Rapai	400 metres	52.73 PB	7	Did not advance			
Bianka Bartha-Kéri	800 metres	2:00.20	4 q	2:01.68	8	Did not advance	
Lili Anna Vindics-Tóth	1500 metres	4:11.08 =PB	13	Did not advance			
Viktória Wagner-Gyürkés	5000 metres	15:29.42	16	—		Did not advance	
Nóra Szabó	Marathon	—				2:33:28	24
Katalin Kovács-Garami	Marathon	—				2:44:02	57
Gréta Kerekes	100 metres hurdles	13.09	7	Did not advance			
Luca Kozák	100 metres hurdles	12.71 SB	3 Q	12.73	4	Did not advance	
Anna Tóth	100 metres hurdles	12.95	6	Did not advance			
Janka Molnár	400 metres hurdles	56.21	7	Did not advance			
Viktória Madarász	20 kilometres walk	—				1:36:13	34
Barbara Oláh	20 kilometres walk	—				1:35:55	33
Viktória Madarász	35 kilometres walk	—				2:53:30 SB	16
Rita Récsei	35 kilometres walk	—				2:59:37	22
Jusztina Csóti; Gréta Kerekes; Anna Luca Kocsis; Boglárka Takács	4 × 100 metres relay	43.38 NR	7	—		Did not advance	
Bianka Kéri; Janka Molnár; Evelin Nádházy; Fanni Rapai	4 × 400 metres relay	3:27.79 NR	5	—		Did not advance	

Field events

Athlete	Event	Qualification		Final	
Athlete	Event	Distance	Position	Distance	Position
Fédra Fekete	High jump	1.80	33	Did not advance	
Hanga Klekner	Pole vault	4.50 PB	18	Did not advance	
Petra Bánhidi-Farkas	Long jump	6.37	27	Did not advance	
Diana Lesti	Long jump	6.25	31	Did not advance	
Beatrix Szabó	Triple jump	12.79	36	Did not advance	
Anita Márton	Shot put	17.85	20	Did not advance	
Dóra Kerekes	Discus throw	54.41	34	Did not advance	
Réka Gyurátz	Hammer throw	66.81	33	Did not advance	
Angéla Moravcsik	Javelin throw	55.10	26	Did not advance	
Réka Szilágyi	Javelin throw	56.21	20	Did not advance	

Combined events – Heptathlon

Athlete	Event	100H	HJ	SP	200 m	LJ	JT	800 m	Final	Rank
Xénia Krizsán	Result	13.48 =SB	1.77 =SB	14.18 =SB	25.16 =SB	6.30 =SB	51.23 =SB	2:08.39 =SB	6479 =SB	4
Xénia Krizsán	Points	1053	941	806	872	943	884	980	6479 =SB	4
Rita Nemes	Result	13.63	1.77	12.97	25.04	6.29	44.68 =SB	2:10.65	6232	10
Rita Nemes	Points	1031	941	725	883	940	757	955	6232	10

=== Mixed ===
Track events

Athlete	Event	Heat		Final	
Athlete	Event	Result	Rank	Result	Rank
Bianka Bartha-Kéri; Attila Molnár; Janka Molnár; Zoltán Wahl	4 × 400 metres relay	3:14.08 NR	10	Did not advance	
