= Germany at the 2023 World Athletics Championships =

- Flag of Germany
- WA code: GER

in Budapest, Hungary 19–27 August 2023
- Competitors: 75 (38 men and 37 women)
- Medals: Gold 0 Silver 0 Bronze 0 Total 0

World Athletics Championships appearances (overview)
- 1991; 1993; 1995; 1997; 1999; 2001; 2003; 2005; 2007; 2009; 2011; 2013; 2015; 2017; 2019; 2022; 2023; 2025

Germany competed at the 2023 World Athletics Championships in Budapest, Hungary, from 19 to 27 August 2023.

For the first time since the championship's inception in 1983, Germany failed to win any medals, marking an unprecedented slump for the nation.

== Results ==
Germany entered 75 athletes.

Key

- Q = Qualified for the next round
- q = Qualified for the next round as a fastest loser or, in field events, by position without achieving the qualifying target
- NR = National record
- PB = Personal best
- SB = Season best
- N/A = Round not applicable for the event

=== Men ===
Track and road events

Athlete	Event	Heat		Semifinal		Final	
Athlete	Event	Result	Rank	Result	Rank	Result	Rank
Julian Wagner	100 metres	10.31	5	Did not advance			
Joshua Hartmann	200 metres	20.51	4	Did not advance			
Manuel Sanders	400 metres	45.34	4	Did not advance			
Amos Bartelsmeyer	1500 metres	3:35.44	7	Did not advance			
Sam Parsons	5000 metres	14:03.14	20	—N/a		Did not advance	
Nils Voigt	10,000 metres	—N/a				29:06.79	21
Johannes Motschmann	Marathon	—N/a				2:14:19	26
Haftom Welday	Marathon	—N/a				2:11:25	15
Joshua Abuaku	400 metres hurdles	48.32 PB	1 Q	48.39	4 q	48.53	8
Emil Agyekum	400 metres hurdles	49.00	6 q	48.71 PB	5	Did not advance	
Constantin Preis	400 metres hurdles	49.45	6	Did not advance			
Karl Bebendorf	3000 metres steeplechase	8:22.33	8	—N/a		Did not advance	
Christopher Linke	20 kilometres walk	—N/a				1:18:12 NR	5
Carl Dohmann	35 kilometres walk	—N/a				DNF	
Karl Junghannß	35 kilometres walk	—N/a				2:27:08 PB	9
Christopher Linke	35 kilometres walk	—N/a				2:25:35 NR	5
Lucas Ansah-Peprah; Joshua Hartmann; Kevin Kranz; Yannick Wolf	4 × 100 metres relay	DNF		—N/a		Did not advance	
Jean Paul Bredau; Marc Koch; Manuel Sanders; Marvin Schlegel	4 × 400 metres relay	3:00.67 SB	6	—N/a		Did not advance	

Field events

Athlete	Event	Qualification		Final	
Athlete	Event	Distance	Position	Distance	Position
Tobias Potye	High jump	2.28	8 q	2.33	5
Gillian Ladwig	Pole vault	5.35	=22	Did not advance	
Oleg Zernikel	Pole vault	5.70 SB	14	Did not advance	
Max Heß	Triple jump	16.48	18	Did not advance	
Henrik Janssen	Discus throw	63.79	11 q	63.80	8
Daniel Jasinski	Discus throw	63.36	17	Did not advance	
Steven Richter	Discus throw	63.37	16	Did not advance	
Merlin Hummel	Hammer throw	NM		Did not advance	
Sören Klose	Hammer throw	72.23	22	Did not advance	
Julian Weber	Javelin throw	82.39	4 q	85.79	4

Combined events – Decathlon

Athlete	Event	100 m	LJ	SP	HJ	400 m	110H	DT	PV	JT	1500 m	Final	Rank
Manuel Eitel	Result	10.44	7.14	14.85	1.99	48.47	14.39	41.30	4.70	60.12	4:33.70 PB	8191	11
Manuel Eitel	Points	989	847	780	794	886	925	691	819	740	720	8191	11
Niklas Kaul	Result	11.20 SB	7.16	14.85 SB	2.02	DNS	—N/a					DNF	
Niklas Kaul	Points	817	852	780	822	—N/a						DNF	
Leo Neugebauer	Result	10.69	8.00 PB	17.04 PB	2.02	47.99	14.75	47.63	5.10	57.95 PB	4:43.93 SB	8645	5
Leo Neugebauer	Points	931	1061	916	822	910	880	821	941	707	656	8645	5

=== Women ===
Track and road events

Athlete	Event	Heat		Semifinal		Final	
Athlete	Event	Result	Rank	Result	Rank	Result	Rank
Rebekka Haase	100 metres	11.43	6	Did not advance			
Gina Lückenkemper	100 metres	11.21	3 Q	11.18	=5	Did not advance	
Christina Hering	800 metres	2:00.06 SB	2 Q	2:01.66	7	Did not advance	
Majtie Kolberg	800 metres	2:01.41	7	Did not advance			
Melat Yisak Kejeta	Marathon	—N/a				2:29:04	11
Eileen Demes	400 metres hurdles	55.29 PB	5 q	56.71	8	Did not advance	
Carolina Krafzik	400 metres hurdles	54.53	3 Q	54.58	5	Did not advance	
Olivia Gürth	3000 metres steeplechase	9:24.28 PB	5 Q	—N/a		9:20.08 PB	14
Saskia Feige	20 kilometres walk	—N/a				1:34:49	29
Bianca Maria Dittrich	35 kilometres walk	—N/a				3:03:05	29
Louise Wieland; Sina Mayer; Gina Lückenkemper; Rebekka Haase	4 × 100 metres relay	42.78 SB	4 qR	—N/a		42.98	6
Luna Thiel; Alica Schmidt; Mona Mayer; Carolina Krafzik	4 × 400 metres relay	3:27.74 SB	6	—N/a		Did not advance	

Field events

Athlete	Event	Qualification		Final	
Athlete	Event	Distance	Position	Distance	Position
Johanna Göring	High jump	1.85	=23	Did not advance	
Christina Honsel	High jump	1.89	=12 q	1.94	8
Anjuli Knäsche	Pole vault	4.35	27	Did not advance	
Mikaëlle Assani	Long jump	6.47	20	Did not advance	
Maryse Luzolo	Long jump	6.66	10 q	6.58	9
Kira Wittmann	Triple jump	13.64	=26	Did not advance	
Sara Gambetta	Shot put	18.70	9 q	18.71	12
Yemisi Ogunleye	Shot put	19.44 PB	3 Q	18.97	10
Julia Ritter	Shot put	18.41 SB	15	Did not advance	
Shanice Craft	Discus throw	63.42	6 q	65.47	7
Kristin Pudenz	Discus throw	62.71	10 q	65.96	6
Claudine Vita	Discus throw	64.51	4 Q	63.19	10

Combined events – Heptathlon

Athlete	Event	100H	HJ	SP	200 m	LJ	JT	800 m	Final	Rank
Vanessa Grimm	Result	14.00	1.74	14.43	24.91	6.10	42.08	2:14.36	6088	14
Vanessa Grimm	Points	978	903	823	895	880	707	902	6088	14
Carolin Schäfer	Result	13.60	1.77	13.98	DNS	DNF				
Carolin Schäfer	Points	1036	941	793	0	DNF				
Sophie Weißenberg	Result	13.58	1.86	13.97	23.88	6.10	48.51	2:18.03	6438	7
Sophie Weißenberg	Points	1039	1054	792	992	880	831	850	6438	7

=== Mixed ===
Track events

Athlete	Event	Heat		Final	
Athlete	Event	Result	Rank	Result	Rank
Jean Paul Bredau; Elisa Lechleitner; Manuel Sanders; Skadi Schier*; Alica Schmidt	4 × 400 metres relay	3:13.25 SB	7 q	3:14.27	7
