= 2023 World Athletics Championships – Women's 400 metres =

Women's 400 metres at the 2023 World Championships
- Venue: National Athletics Centre
- Dates: 20 August (heats); 21 August (semi-finals); 23 August (final)
- Competitors: 48 from 36 nations
- Winning time: 48.76

Medalists
gold medal	Marileidy Paulino	Dominican Republic
silver medal	Natalia Kaczmarek	Poland
bronze medal	Sada Williams	Barbados

The women's 400 metres at the 2023 World Athletics Championships was held at the National Athletics Centre in Budapest, Hungary from 20 to 23 August 2023. The winning margin was 0.81 seconds which as of 2024 is the only time the women's 400 metres has been won by more than 0.7 seconds at these championships.

== Summary ==
The buildup to the event was very hectic, as world leader Sydney McLaughlin-Levrone withdrew just a few weeks before the championships started, citing a minor knee injury. 2019 champion and #3 all-time Salwa Eid Naser also withdrew, just days before the heats started. Aside from the withdrawals, some big names also failed to make it past the first round. Defending champion and #6 all-time Shaunae Miller-Uibo was not back in full form, as she returned to the track just four months after giving birth to her first child. Another big name that failed to make it to the semi-final round was world number three Britton Wilson, who finished last in her opening heat. All of the semi-finalists had sub-50 credentials, six of them broke 50 in the semi-final round. That also meant they all had a sub-50 recently.

In the final, Lieke Klaver was out fast, making up the stagger on Natalia Kaczmarek to her outside down the backstretch. After the halfway mark, returning silver medalist Marileidy Paulino began to make up ground on returning bronze medalist Sada Williams to her outside. When Paulino hit the 100 metre start line, she had a step on Klaver and two more on her next pursuers Williams, Rhasidat Adeleke and Kaczmarek. Down the stretch, Klaver was gritting her teeth but was moving backwards relative to Kaczmarek, Adeleke and Williams, but Paulino was so far this was clearly a battle just for silver. Kaczmarek emerged as the next best, holding a step on Williams as Adeleke faded. Paulino finished 6 metres up on Kaczmarek with Williams taking a second bronze in a row.

Paulino's 48.76 National Record makes her the eleventh fastest in history. Only the three medalists were able to break 50 in the final.

== Records ==
Before the competition records were as follows:

Record	Athlete & Nat.	Perf.	Location	Date
World record	Marita Koch (GDR)	47.60	Canberra, Australia	6 October 1985
Championship record	Jarmila Kratochvílová (TCH)	47.99	Helsinki, Finland	10 August 1983
World Leading	Sydney McLaughlin-Levrone (USA)	48.74	Eugene, United States	8 July 2023
African Record	Falilat Ogunkoya (NGR)	49.10	Atlanta, United States	29 July 1996
Asian Record	Salwa Eid Naser (BHR)	48.14	Doha, Qatar	3 October 2019
North, Central American and Caribbean record	Shaunae Miller-Uibo (BAH)	48.36	Tokyo, Japan	6 August 2021
South American Record	Ximena Restrepo (COL)	49.64	Barcelona, Spain	5 August 1992
European Record	Marita Koch (GDR)	47.60	Canberra, Australia	6 October 1985
Oceanian record	Cathy Freeman (AUS)	48.63	Atlanta, United States	29 July 1996

== Qualification standard ==
The standard to qualify automatically for entry was 51.00.

== Schedule ==
The event schedule, in local time (UTC+2), was as follows:

Date	Time	Round
20 August	9:35	Heats
21 August	21:12	Semi-finals
23 August	21:35	Final

== Results ==
=== Heats ===
The first 3 athletes in each heat (Q) and the next 6 fastest (q) qualify for the semi-finals.

Rank	Heat	Name	Nationality	Time	Notes
1	6	Marileidy Paulino	Dominican Republic	49.90	Q
2	1	Natalia Kaczmarek	Poland	50.02	Q
3	1	Cynthia Bolingo	Belgium	50.29	Q, SB
4	1	Candice McLeod	Jamaica	50.37	Q
5	4	Nickisha Pryce	Jamaica	50.38	Q
6	2	Lieke Klaver	Netherlands	50.52	Q
7	6	Victoria Ohuruogu	Great Britain & N.I.	50.60	Q
8	3	Sada Williams	Barbados	50.78	Q
9	5	Rhasidat Adeleke	Ireland	50.80	Q
10	2	Ama Pipi	Great Britain & N.I.	50.81	Q
11	2	Lynna Irby-Jackson	United States	50.81	Q
12	4	Roxana Gómez	Cuba	50.86	Q
13	6	Talitha Diggs	United States	50.87	Q
14	6	Lada Vondrová	Czech Republic	50.92	q, PB
15	2	Susanne Walli	Austria	51.00	q
16	6	Modesta Justė Morauskaitė	Lithuania	51.06	q, SB
17	4	Gabby Scott	Puerto Rico	51.07	Q, SB
18	1	Sharlene Mawdsley	Ireland	51.17	q, PB
19	5	Andrea Miklós	Romania	51.24	Q
20	6	Charokee Young	Jamaica	51.24	q
21	2	Evelis Aguilar	Colombia	51.27	q, PB
22	5	Tereza Petržilková	Czech Republic	51.30	Q
23	5	Henriette Jæger	Norway	51.33	
24	4	Martina Weil	Chile	51.35	
25	1	Gunta Vaičule	Latvia	51.36	SB
26	5	Aliyah Abrams	Guyana	51.44	
27	5	Helena Ponette	Belgium	51.52	PB
28	1	Alice Mangione	Italy	51.57	
29	3	Paola Morán	Mexico	51.59	Q
30	4	Grace Konrad	Canada	51.60	PB
31	3	Zenéy van der Walt	South Africa	51.76	Q
32	3	Cátia Azevedo	Portugal	51.93	
33	3	Amandine Brossier	France	51.98	SB
34	3	Imaobong Nse Uko	Nigeria	52.24	
35	2	Kyra Constantine	Canada	52.28	
36	1	Miranda Charlene Coetzee	South Africa	52.30	
37	3	Shaunae Miller-Uibo	Bahamas	52.65	
38	4	Giulia Senn	Switzerland	52.66	
39	1	Kateryna Karpiuk	Ukraine	52.66	
40	4	Fanni Rapai	Hungary	52.73	PB
41	5	Mette Baas	Finland	52.74	
42	2	Nicole Caicedo	Ecuador	52.82	
43	3	Rosie Elliott	New Zealand	52.88	
44	6	Tiffani Marinho	Brazil	53.12	
45	6	Marlie Viljoen	South Africa	53.73	
46	4	Britton Wilson	United States	53.87	
47	5	Tabata Vitorino	Brazil	54.15	
48	2	Janet Richard	Malta	54.50	

=== Semi-finals ===
The first 2 athletes in each heat (Q) and the next 2 fastest (q) qualify for the final.

Rank	Heat	Name	Nationality	Time	Notes
1	3	Natalia Kaczmarek	Poland	49.50	Q
2	1	Marileidy Paulino	Dominican Republic	49.54	Q
3	3	Sada Williams	Barbados	49.58	Q, NR
4	1	Rhasidat Adeleke	Ireland	49.87	Q
5	2	Lieke Klaver	Netherlands	49.87	Q
6	1	Cynthia Bolingo	Belgium	49.96	q, NR
7	1	Candice McLeod	Jamaica	50.62	q
8	3	Lynna Irby-Jackson	United States	50.71	
9	3	Victoria Ohuruogu	Great Britain & N.I.	50.74	
10	3	Andrea Miklós	Romania	50.77	
11	2	Talitha Diggs	United States	50.86	Q
12	1	Evelis Aguilar	Colombia	51.07	PB
13	2	Roxana Gómez	Cuba	51.07	
14	2	Ama Pipi	Great Britain & N.I.	51.17	
15	2	Nickisha Pryce	Jamaica	51.24	
16	3	Charokee Young	Jamaica	51.40	
17	1	Paola Morán	Mexico	51.46	
18	3	Susanne Walli	Austria	51.50	
19	1	Lada Vondrová	Czech Republic	51.50	
20	2	Gabby Scott	Puerto Rico	51.52	
21	1	Zenéy van der Walt	South Africa	51.54	
22	2	Sharlene Mawdsley	Ireland	51.78	
23	3	Tereza Petržilková	Czech Republic	51.94	
24	2	Modesta Justė Morauskaitė	Lithuania	52.15	

=== Final ===
The final was held on Wednesday 23 August 2023.

Rank	Name	Nationality	Time	Notes
1st place, gold medalist(s)	Marileidy Paulino	Dominican Republic	48.76	NR
2nd place, silver medalist(s)	Natalia Kaczmarek	Poland	49.57	
3rd place, bronze medalist(s)	Sada Williams	Barbados	49.60	
4	Rhasidat Adeleke	Ireland	50.13	
5	Cynthia Bolingo	Belgium	50.33	
6	Lieke Klaver	Netherlands	50.33	
7	Candice McLeod	Jamaica	51.08	
8	Talitha Diggs	United States	51.25	
