= 2023 World Athletics Championships – Men's 1500 metres =

Men's 1500 metres at the 2023 World Championships
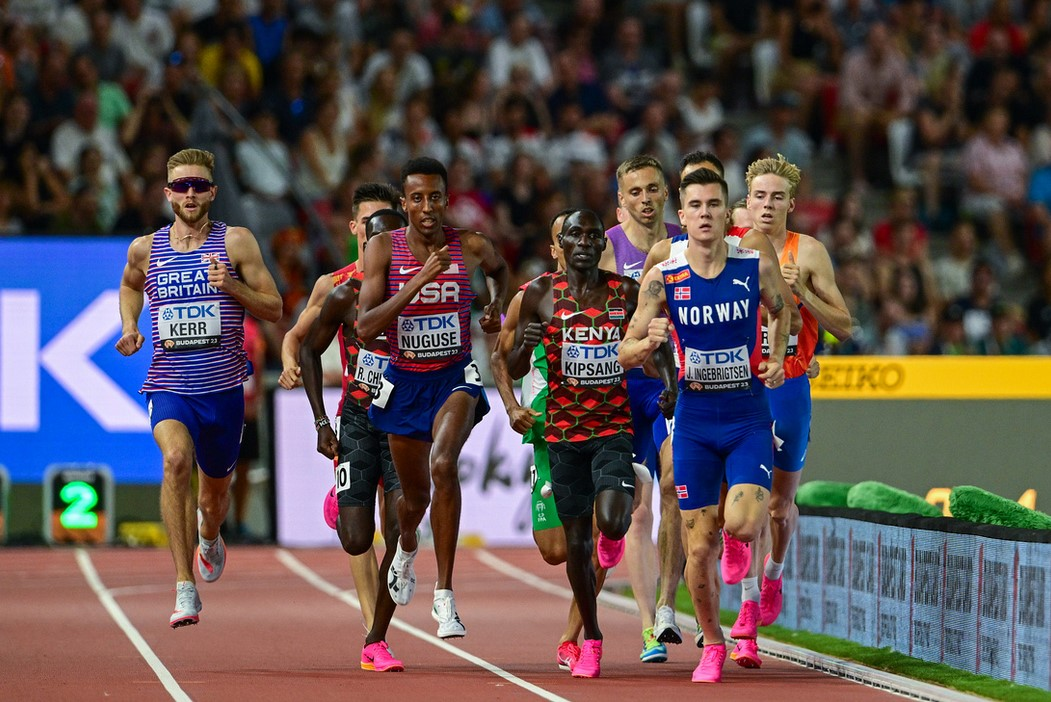
- Venue: National Athletics Centre
- Dates: 19 August (heats); 20 August (semi-finals); 23 August (final)
- Competitors: 57 from 34 nations
- Winning time: 3:29.38

Medalists
| gold medal | Josh Kerr | Great Britain |
| silver medal | Jakob Ingebrigtsen | Norway |
| bronze medal | Narve Gilje Nordås | Norway |

The men's 1500 metres at the 2023 World Athletics Championships was held at the National Athletics Centre in Budapest from 19 to 23 August 2023. British athlete Josh Kerr won the event, followed by Norwegians Jakob Ingebristen and Narve Gilje Nordås.

== Summary ==
Jakob Ingebrigtsen, the 2021 Olympic Champion in the event, entered the race as a favorite but was upset by Josh Kerr. Ingebrigtsen led the field through 800 meters in 1:54.2. Kerr moved to the lead with 200 meters remaining. Kerr won by a margin of 0.27 seconds in 3:29.38, followed by Ingebrigtsen and Narve Gilje Nordås.

== Records ==
Before the competition records were as follows:

| Record | Athlete & Nat. | Perf. | Location | Date |
|---|---|---|---|---|
| World record | Hicham El Guerrouj (MAR) | 3:26.00 | Rome, Italy | 14 July 1998 |
| Championship record | Hicham El Guerrouj (MAR) | 3:27.65 | Seville, Spain | 24 August 1999 |
| World Leading | Jakob Ingebrigtsen (NOR) | 3:27.14 | Chorzów, Poland | 16 July 2023 |
| African Record | Hicham El Guerrouj (MAR) | 3:26.00 | Rome, Italy | 14 July 1998 |
| Asian Record | Rashid Ramzi (BHR) | 3:29.14 | Rome, Italy | 14 July 2006 |
| European Record | Jakob Ingebrigtsen (NOR) | 3:27.14 | Chorzów, Poland | 16 July 2023 |
| North, Central American and Caribbean record | Yared Nuguse (USA) | 3:29.02 | Oslo, Norway | 15 June 2023 |
| Oceanian record | Olli Hoare (AUS) | 3:29.41 | Oslo, Norway | 15 June 2023 |
| South American Record | Hudson Santos de Souza (BRA) | 3:33.25 | Rieti, Italy | 28 August 2005 |

== Qualification standard ==
The standard to qualify automatically for entry was 3:34.20.

== Schedule ==
The event schedule, in local time (UTC +2), was as follows:

| Date | Time | Round |
|---|---|---|
| 19 August | 19:02 | Heats |
| 20 August | 17:35 | Semi-finals |
| 23 August | 21:15 | Final |

== Results ==
=== Heats ===
First 6 of each heat (Q) qualify to the semi-finals.

| Rank | Heat | Name | Nationality | Time | Notes |
|---|---|---|---|---|---|
| 1 | 1 | Jakob Ingebrigtsen | Norway | 3:33.94 | Q |
| 2 | 1 | Josh Kerr | Great Britain & N.I. | 3:34.00 | Q |
| 3 | 4 | Abel Kipsang | Kenya | 3:34.08 | Q |
| 4 | 4 | Yared Nuguse | United States | 3:34.16 | Q |
| 5 | 4 | Adam Spencer | Australia | 3:34.17 | Q |
| 6 | 1 | Reynold Cheruiyot | Kenya | 3:34.24 | Q |
| 7 | 3 | Niels Laros | Netherlands | 3:34.25 | Q |
| 8 | 4 | Charles Grethen | Luxembourg | 3:34.32 | Q, SB |
| 9 | 3 | Mohamed Katir | Spain | 3:34.34 | Q |
| 10 | 1 | Adel Mechaal | Spain | 3:34.35 | Q |
| 11 | 1 | Isaac Nader | Portugal | 3:34.36 | Q |
| 12 | 3 | Cole Hocker | United States | 3:34.43 | Q |
| 13 | 3 | Pietro Arese | Italy | 3:34.48 | Q |
| 14 | 1 | Charles Philibert-Thiboutot | Canada | 3:34.60 | Q |
| 15 | 4 | Elliot Giles | Great Britain & N.I. | 3:34.63 | Q |
| 16 | 3 | Narve Gilje Nordås | Norway | 3:34.67 | Q |
| 17 | 4 | Andrew Coscoran | Ireland | 3:34.75 | Q |
| 18 | 4 | Ossama Meslek | Italy | 3:35.12 | |
| 19 | 3 | Azeddine Habz | France | 3:35.16 | Q |
| 20 | 4 | Salim Keddar | Algeria | 3:35.17 | |
| 21 | 1 | Amos Bartelsmeyer | Germany | 3:35.44 | |
| 22 | 4 | Jochem Vermeulen | Belgium | 3:35.45 | |
| 23 | 4 | Anass Essayi | Morocco | 3:35.63 | |
| 24 | 3 | Stewart McSweyn | Australia | 3:36.01 | |
| 25 | 4 | Michał Rozmys | Poland | 3:36.26 | SB |
| 26 | 4 | Raphael Pallitsch | Austria | 3:36.47 | PB |
| 27 | 1 | Samuel Zeleke | Ethiopia | 3:36.57 | |
| 28 | 3 | Kieran Lumb | Canada | 3:36.66 | |
| 29 | 3 | Abdellatif Sadiki | Morocco | 3:37.19 | |
| 30 | 4 | Kristian Uldbjerg Hansen | Denmark | 3:37.27 | PB |
| 31 | 3 | Elzan Bibić | Serbia | 3:37.45 | |
| 32 | 3 | István Szögi | Hungary | 3:37.57 | |
| 33 | 1 | Abraham Guem | South Sudan | 3:37.85 | PB |
| 34 | 3 | Abu Mayanja | Uganda | 3:38.15 | |
| 35 | 3 | Ajay Kumar Saroj | India | 3:38.24 | PB |
| 36 | 3 | Diego Lacamoire | Argentina | 3:38.92 | PB |
| 37 | 1 | Ryan Mphahlele | South Africa | 3:39.16 | |
| 38 | 1 | Yervand Mkrtchyan | Armenia | 3:39.35 | NR |
| 39 | 3 | Ismael Debjani | Belgium | 3:39.73 | |
| 40 | 1 | Nicholas Griggs | Ireland | 3:40.72 | |
| 41 | 4 | Adisu Girma | Ethiopia | 3:45.86 | |
| 42 | 1 | Matthew Ramsden | Australia | 3:46.45 | qR |
| 43 | 2 | Mario García | Spain | 3:46.77 | Q |
| 44 | 2 | Tshepo Tshite | South Africa | 3:46.79 | Q |
| 45 | 2 | Neil Gourley | Great Britain & N.I. | 3:46.87 | Q |
| 46 | 2 | Samuel Tanner | New Zealand | 3:46.93 | Q |
| 47 | 2 | Ruben Verheyden | Belgium | 3:47.02 | Q |
| 48 | 2 | Timothy Cheruiyot | Kenya | 3:47.09 | Q |
| 49 | 2 | Joonas Rinne | Finland | 3:47.16 | |
| 50 | 2 | Joe Waskom | United States | 3:47.26 | |
| 51 | 2 | Hicham Akankam | Morocco | 3:47.45 | |
| 52 | 2 | Luke McCann | Ireland | 3:47.48 | |
| 53 | 2 | Teddese Lemi | Ethiopia | 3:47.49 | |
| 54 | 2 | Rob Napolitano | Puerto Rico | 3:48.29 | |
| 55 | 2 | Joao Bussotti | Italy | 3:48.55 | |
| 56 | 2 | Julian Ranc | France | 3:48.63 | |
| 57 | 1 | Tom Elmer | Switzerland | 3:55.72 | qR |
| 58 | 1 | Emil Danielsson | Sweden | 3:57.70 | qR |

=== Semi-finals ===
First 6 of each semi-final (Q) qualify to the final.

| Rank | Heat | Name | Nationality | Time | Notes |
|---|---|---|---|---|---|
| 1 | 1 | Yared Nuguse | United States | 3:32.69 | Q |
| 2 | 1 | Abel Kipsang | Kenya | 3:32.72 | Q |
| 3 | 1 | Niels Laros | Netherlands | 3:32.74 | Q |
| 4 | 1 | Azeddine Habz | France | 3:32.79 | Q |
| 5 | 1 | Narve Gilje Nordås | Norway | 3:32.81 | Q |
| 6 | 1 | Neil Gourley | Great Britain & N.I. | 3:32.97 | Q |
| 7 | 1 | Tshepo Tshite | South Africa | 3:32.98 | |
| 8 | 1 | Pietro Arese | Italy | 3:33.11 | |
| 9 | 1 | Adel Mechaal | Spain | 3:33.33 | |
| 10 | 1 | Mohamed Katir | Spain | 3:33.56 | |
| 11 | 1 | Ruben Verheyden | Belgium | 3:33.96 | |
| 12 | 1 | Emil Danielsson | Sweden | 3:34.16 | |
| 13 | 2 | Jakob Ingebrigtsen | Norway | 3:34.98 | Q |
| 14 | 2 | Josh Kerr | Great Britain & N.I. | 3:35.14 | Q |
| 15 | 2 | Cole Hocker | United States | 3:35.23 | Q |
| 16 | 2 | Mario García | Spain | 3:35.26 | Q |
| 17 | 2 | Isaac Nader | Portugal | 3:35.31 | Q |
| 18 | 2 | Reynold Cheruiyot | Kenya | 3:35.53 | Q |
| 19 | 2 | Charles Grethen | Luxembourg | 3:36.11 | |
| 20 | 2 | Samuel Tanner | New Zealand | 3:36.58 | |
| 21 | 1 | Matthew Ramsden | Australia | 3:36.83 | |
| 22 | 1 | Andrew Coscoran | Ireland | 3:37.39 | |
| 23 | 2 | Timothy Cheruiyot | Kenya | 3:37.40 | |
| 24 | 2 | Charles Philibert-Thiboutot | Canada | 3:37.41 | |
| 25 | 2 | Tom Elmer | Switzerland | 3:38.33 | |
| 26 | 2 | Elliot Giles | Great Britain & N.I. | 3:39.05 | |
| 27 | 2 | Adam Spencer | Australia | 3:42.10 | |

=== Final ===
The final was started on 23 August at 21:16.

| Rank | Name | Nationality | Time | Notes |
|---|---|---|---|---|
| 1st place, gold medalist(s) | Josh Kerr | Great Britain & N.I. | 3:29.38 | SB |
| 2nd place, silver medalist(s) | Jakob Ingebrigtsen | Norway | 3:29.65 | |
| 3rd place, bronze medalist(s) | Narve Gilje Nordås | Norway | 3:29.68 | |
| 4 | Abel Kipsang | Kenya | 3:29.89 | |
| 5 | Yared Nuguse | United States | 3:30.25 | |
| 6 | Mario García | Spain | 3:30.26 | |
| 7 | Cole Hocker | United States | 3:30.70 | PB |
| 8 | Reynold Cheruiyot | Kenya | 3:30.78 | |
| 9 | Neil Gourley | Great Britain & N.I. | 3:31.10 | |
| 10 | Niels Laros | Netherlands | 3:31.25 | NR |
| 11 | Azeddine Habz | France | 3:33.14 | |
| 12 | Isaac Nader | Portugal | 3:35.41 | |
