= 2023 World Athletics Championships – Men's 100 metres =

Men's 100 metres at the 2023 World Championships
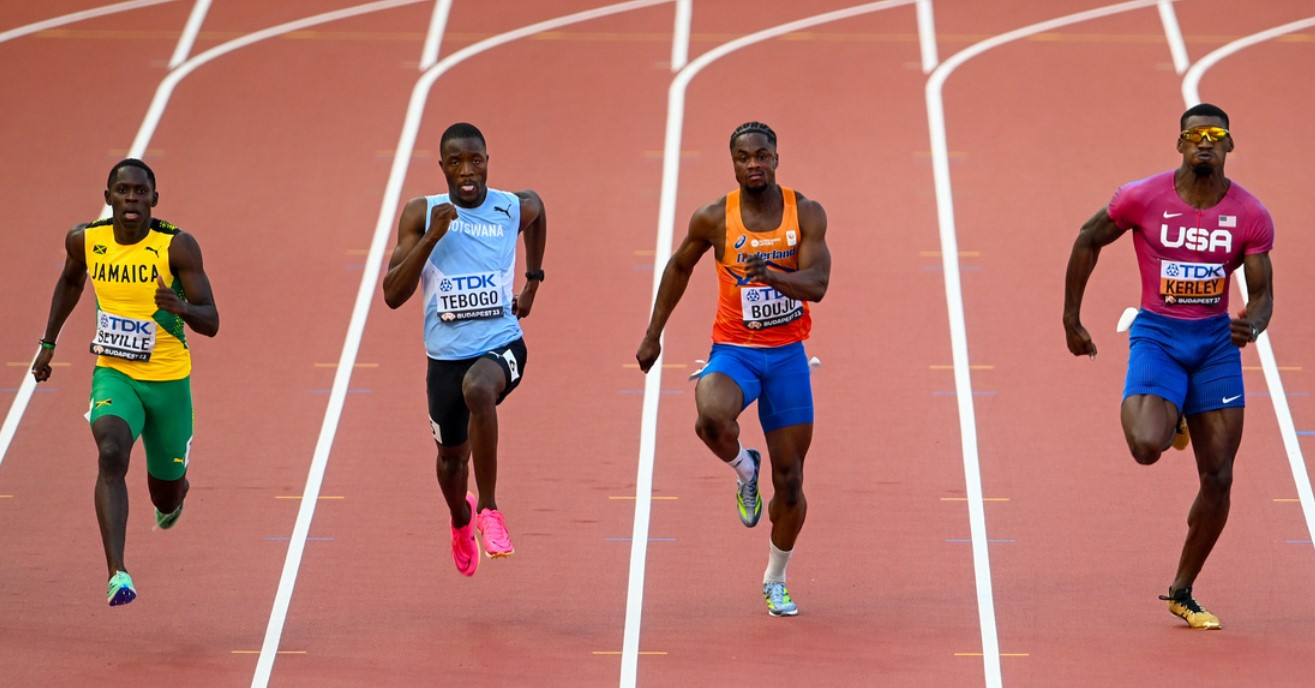
- Semi-final of the event
- Venue: National Athletics Centre
- Dates: 19 August (preliminary round & heats); 20 August (semi-final & final)
- Competitors: 75 from 57 nations
- Winning time: 9.83

Medalists
gold medal	Noah Lyles	United States
silver medal	Letsile Tebogo	Botswana
bronze medal	Zharnel Hughes	Great Britain

Video on YouTube Official Video

The men's 100 metres at the 2023 World Athletics Championships was held at the National Athletics Centre in Budapest on 19 and 20 August 2023.

== Summary ==
With 13 athletes under 9.90 for the season, the field was crowded and fast. NCAA Champion Cravont Charleston didn't get out of the heats. Olympic Champion Marcell Jacobs and defending champion Fred Kerley didn't make the final. Meanwhile, 200 metre defending champion Noah Lyles claimed to be in pursuit of three gold medals, even though he had only finished third at the US Championships. Oblique Seville produced the fastest time through the rounds with his 9.86 in the heats.

In the final, fast starting 2019 champion Christian Coleman lived up to his reputation, getting out fastest, slightly ahead of U20 Champion Letsile Tebogo and Ryiem Forde. By the halfway point, Coleman had a metre and a half on the next group of Seville, Lyles and Zharnel Hughes, but the three were closing. Over the next 30 metres, Lyles gained a slight edge on Hughes and Seville, pulling even with Coleman and Tebogo. Over the final 20 metres, Lyles continued to increase the narrow gap while Coleman drifted out the back. Lyles crossed the finish as a clear winner, with Tebogo, Hughes and Seville hitting the line together. The photo finish revealed Tebogo in second, one one thousandth ahead of Hughes for bronze with Seville only three thousandths behind him. Tebogo's version of 9.88 improved on his own Botswana national record for the seventh time; his silver medal was the first won by an African man in the 100m at the world championships.

== Records ==
Before the competition records were as follows:

Record	Athlete & Nat.	Perf.	Location	Date
World record	Usain Bolt (JAM)	9.58	Berlin, Germany	16 August 2009
Championship record	Usain Bolt (JAM)	9.58	Berlin, Germany	16 August 2009
World Leading	Zharnel Hughes (GBR)	9.83	New York City, United States	24 June 2023
African Record	Ferdinand Omanyala (KEN)	9.77	Nairobi, Kenya	18 September 2021
Asian Record	Su Bingtian (CHN)	9.83	Tokyo, Japan	1 August 2021
European Record	Marcell Jacobs (ITA)	9.80	Tokyo, Japan	1 August 2021
North, Central American and Caribbean record	Usain Bolt (JAM)	9.58	Berlin, Germany	16 August 2009
Oceanian record	Patrick Johnson (AUS)	9.93	Mito, Japan	5 May 2003
South American Record	Issamade Asinga (SUR)	9.89	São Paulo, Brazil	28 July 2023

The following records were set at the competition:

Record	Perf.	Athlete	Nat.	Date
World Leading	9.83	Noah Lyles	USA	20 Aug 2023

== Qualification standard ==
The standard to qualify automatically for entry was 10.00 seconds.

== Schedule ==
The event schedule, in local time (UTC+2), was as follows:

Date	Time	Round
19 August	13:35	Preliminary round
19 August	19:43	Heats
20 August	16:35	Semi-finals
20 August	19:10	Final

== Results ==
=== Preliminary round ===
The preliminary round took place on 19 August, with the 33 athletes involved being split into three heats of eight athletes each, and one of nine athletes. The first two athletes in each heat ( Q ) and the next two fastest ( q ) qualified for round 1.

==== Heat 1 ====
Rank	Lane	Athlete	Nation	Time	Notes
1	4	Emanuel Archibald	Guyana	10.27	Q
2	7	Bence Boros	Hungary	10.70	Q
3	5	Kin Wa Chan	Macau	10.79	q
4	2	Terrone Webster	Anguilla	11.03	
5	8	Timur Isakov	Kyrgyzstan	11.22	PB
6	3	Karalo Hepoiteloto Maibuca	Tuvalu	11.55	SB
7	6	Tauro Tiaon	Kiribati	12.00	PB
				Wind: 0.0 m/s	

==== Heat 2 ====
Rank	Lane	Athlete	Nation	Time	Notes
1	3	Muhd Azeem Fahmi	Malaysia	10.24	Q
2	2	Brandon Jones	Belize	10.94	Q
3	7	Seco Camara	Guinea-Bissau	11.04	
4	4	Aayush Kunwar	Nepal	11.07	
5	5	Winzar Kakiouea	Nauru	11.23	PB
6	8	Kylian Vatrican	Monaco	11.44	SB
—	6	Dylan Sicobo	Seychelles	DNS	
				Wind: +0.2 m/s	

==== Heat 3 ====
Rank	Lane	Athlete	Nation	Time	Notes
1	4	Imranur Rahman	Bangladesh	10.50	Q
2	7	Onisio Pereia	Mozambique	10.89	Q
3	2	Alisher Sadulayev	Turkmenistan	10.90	
4	9	Melique Garcia	Honduras	10.96	
5	8	Melino Tafuna	Tonga	11.14	PB
6	6	Manuihei Teaha	French Polynesia	11.66	PB
7	3	Ty'ree Langidrik	Marshall Islands	11.78	PB
—	5	Said Gilani	Afghanistan	DNF	
				Wind: -0.8 m/s	

==== Heat 4 ====
Rank	Lane	Athlete	Nation	Time	Notes
1	2	Ebrahima Camara	Gambia	10.32	Q
2	5	Joseph Green	Guam	10.84	Q, PB
3	4	Favoris Muzrapov	Tajikistan	10.86	q
4	3	Nujoom Hassan	Maldives	11.30	PB
5	7	Nathan Crumpton	American Samoa	11.32	SB
6	6	Scott James Fiti	Federated States of Micronesia	11.69	
—	8	Olivier Mwimba	DR Congo	DNS	
				Wind: -0.3 m/s	

=== Round 1 (heats) ===
Round 1 took place on 19 August, with the 56 athletes involved being split into 7 heats of 8 athletes each. The first 3 athletes in each heat ( Q ) and the next 3 fastest ( q ) qualified for the semi-finals.

==== Heat 1 ====
Rank	Lane	Athlete	Nation	Time	Notes
1	4	Zharnel Hughes	Great Britain & N.I.	10.00	Q
2	5	Ryiem Forde	Jamaica	10.01	Q
3	8	Seye Ogunlewe	Nigeria	10.07	Q
4	2	Dominik Kopeć	Poland	10.12	q
5	6	Hassan Taftian	Iran	10.17	
6	9	Tiaan Whelpton	New Zealand	10.26	
7	3	Favoris Muzrapov	Tajikistan	10.99	
8	7	Arthur Cissé	Ivory Coast	11.58	
				Wind: 0.0 m/s	

==== Heat 2 ====
Rank	Lane	Athlete	Nation	Time	Notes
1	9	Noah Lyles	United States	9.95	Q
2	4	Ferdinand Omanyala	Kenya	9.97	Q
3	8	Usheoritse Itsekiri	Nigeria	10.17	Q
4	3	Samuele Ceccarelli	Italy	10.26	
5	5	Jerome Blake	Canada	10.29	
6	6	Emmanuel Eseme	Cameroon	10.41	
7	7	Jake Doran	Australia	10.48	
8	2	Kin Wa Chan	Macau	10.83	
				Wind: -0.6 m/s	

==== Heat 3 ====
Rank	Lane	Athlete	Nation	Time	Notes
1	8	Raphael Bouju	Netherlands	10.09	Q
2	2	Eugene Amo-Dadzie	Great Britain & N.I.	10.10	Q
3	9	Emmanuel Matadi	Liberia	10.13	Q
4	4	Benjamin Richardson	South Africa	10.17	
5	7	Cravont Charleston	United States	10.18	
6	3	Felipe Bardi	Brazil	10.25 [.243]	
7	5	Ján Volko	Slovakia	10.25 [.250]	
8	6	Onisio Pereia	Mozambique	11.09	
				Wind: 0.0 m/s	

==== Heat 4 ====
Rank	Lane	Athlete	Nation	Time	Notes
1	9	Letsile Tebogo	Botswana	10.11 [.102]	Q
2	4	Rohan Browning	Australia	10.11 [.103]	Q
3	8	Reece Prescod	Great Britain & N.I.	10.14	Q
4	5	Shaun Maswanganyi	South Africa	10.21	
5	2	Ryuichiro Sakai	Japan	10.22	
6	6	Cejhae Greene	Antigua and Barbuda	10.23	
7	3	Muhd Azeem Fahmi	Malaysia	10.26	
8	7	Bence Boros	Hungary	10.70	
				Wind: -0.4 m/s	

==== Heat 5 ====
Rank	Lane	Athlete	Nation	Time	Notes
1	7	Oblique Seville	Jamaica	9.86	Q, PB
2	4	Fred Kerley	United States	9.99	Q
3	5	Henrik Larsson	Sweden	10.16	Q
4	3	Mouhamadou Fall	France	10.19	
5	2	Ebrahima Camara	Gambia	10.20	
6	9	Paulo André de Oliveira	Brazil	10.25	
7	8	Brandon Jones	Belize	10.95	
—	6	Favour Oghene Tejiri Ashe	Nigeria	DQ	TR 16.8
				Wind: 0.0 m/s	

==== Heat 6 ====
Rank	Lane	Athlete	Nation	Time	Notes
1	4	Abdul Hakim Sani Brown	Japan	10.07	Q, SB
2	2	Rohan Watson	Jamaica	10.11	Q
3	8	Marcell Jacobs	Italy	10.15	Q, SB
4	5	Brendon Rodney	Canada	10.16	q
5	6	Rikkoi Brathwaite	British Virgin Islands	10.18	
6	9	Terrence Jones	Bahamas	10.32	
7	7	Imranur Rahman	Bangladesh	10.41	
8	3	Ronal Longa	Colombia	11.31	
				Wind: -0.4 m/s	

==== Heat 7 ====
Rank	Lane	Athlete	Nation	Time	Notes
1	4	Akani Simbine	South Africa	9.97	Q
2	2	Christian Coleman	United States	9.98	Q
3	7	Emanuel Archibald	Guyana	10.20 [.193]	Q
3	6	Hiroki Yanagita	Japan	10.20 [.193]	Q
5	3	Julian Wagner	Germany	10.31	
6	9	Erik Cardoso	Brazil	10.36	
7	8	Markus Fuchs	Austria	10.43	
8	5	Joseph Green	Guam	10.91	
				Wind: -0.1 m/s	

=== Semi-finals ===
The semi-finals took place on 20 August, with the 24 athletes involved being split into 3 heats of 8 athletes each. The first 2 athletes in each heat ( Q ) and the next 2 fastest ( q ) qualified for the final.

==== Heat 1 ====
Rank	Lane	Athlete	Nation	Time	Notes
1	4	Noah Lyles	United States	9.87	Q, SB
2	6	Abdul Hakim Sani Brown	Japan	9.97	Q, =PB
3	5	Ferdinand Omanyala	Kenya	10.01	q
4	7	Eugene Amo-Dadzie	Great Britain & N.I.	10.03	
5	3	Marcell Jacobs	Italy	10.05	SB
6	8	Rohan Watson	Jamaica	10.07	
7	2	Dominik Kopeć	Poland	10.15	
8	9	Usheoritse Itsekiri	Nigeria	10.19	
				Wind: +0.3 m/s	

==== Heat 2 ====
Rank	Lane	Athlete	Nation	Time	Notes
1	5	Christian Coleman	United States	9.88	Q, SB
2	7	Zharnel Hughes	Great Britain & N.I.	9.93	Q
3	6	Ryiem Forde	Jamaica	9.95	q, PB
4	8	Emmanuel Matadi	Liberia	10.04	
5	3	Seye Ogunlewe	Nigeria	10.12	
6	9	Emanuel Archibald	Guyana	10.13	PB
7	2	Hiroki Yanagita	Japan	10.14	
—	4	Akani Simbine	South Africa	DQ	TR 16.8
				Wind: 0.0 m/s	

==== Heat 3 ====
Rank	Lane	Athlete	Nation	Time	Notes
1	7	Oblique Seville	Jamaica	9.90	Q
2	6	Letsile Tebogo	Botswana	9.98	Q
3	4	Fred Kerley	United States	10.02	
4	3	Rohan Browning	Australia	10.11	
5	5	Raphael Bouju	Netherlands	10.20	
6	9	Henrik Larsson	Sweden	10.20	
7	2	Brendon Rodney	Canada	10.25	
8	8	Reece Prescod	Great Britain & N.I.	10.26	
				Wind: -0.3 m/s	

=== Final ===
The final started at 19:10 on 20 August.

Rank	Lane	Athlete	Nation	Time	Notes
1st place, gold medalist(s)	6	Noah Lyles	United States	9.83	=WL, PB
2nd place, silver medalist(s)	3	Letsile Tebogo	Botswana	9.88 [.873]	NR
3rd place, bronze medalist(s)	5	Zharnel Hughes	Great Britain & N.I.	9.88 [.874]	
4	7	Oblique Seville	Jamaica	9.88 [.877]	
5	4	Christian Coleman	United States	9.92	
6	8	Abdul Hakim Sani Brown	Japan	10.04	
7	9	Ferdinand Omanyala	Kenya	10.07	
8	2	Ryiem Forde	Jamaica	10.08	
				Wind: 0.0 m/s	
