= Netherlands at the 2023 World Athletics Championships =

- Flag of Netherlands
- WA code: NED
- National federation: Royal Dutch Athletics Federation

in Budapest, Hungary 19 August 2023 – 27 August 2023
- Competitors: 41 (19 men and 22 women)
- Medals Ranked 8th: Gold 2 Silver 1 Bronze 2 Total 5

World Athletics Championships appearances (overview)
- 1976; 1980; 1983; 1987; 1991; 1993; 1995; 1997; 1999; 2001; 2003; 2005; 2007; 2009; 2011; 2013; 2015; 2017; 2019; 2022; 2023; 2025

The Netherlands competed at the 2023 World Championships in Athletics in Budapest, Hungary from 19 to 27 August 2023. The Royal Dutch Athletics Federation announced their selection of 41 competitors, 19 men and 22 women, on 2 August 2023.

These world championships were the most successful edition for the Netherlands with the most medals (5) and the highest medal ranking (8th).

== Medalists ==
Medal	Athlete	Event	Date
Gold	Femke Bol	Women's 400 metres hurdles	24 August 2023
Gold	Eveline Saalberg; Lieke Klaver; Cathelijn Peeters; Femke Bol; Lisanne de Witte*	Women's 4 × 400 metres relay	27 August 2023
Silver	Sifan Hassan	Women's 5000 metres	26 August 2023
Bronze	Anouk Vetter	Women's heptathlon	20 August 2023
Bronze	Sifan Hassan	Women's 1500 metres	22 August 2023

* – Indicates the athlete competed in heats but not the final

== Results ==
Netherlands entered 41 athletes. Nick Smidt withdrew from competition due to an injury.

=== Men ===
Track and road events

Athlete	Event	Heat		Semifinal		Final	
Athlete	Event	Result	Rank	Result	Rank	Result	Rank
Raphael Bouju	100 metres	10.09	1 Q	10.20	5	Did not advance	
Taymir Burnet	200 metres	20.31 PB	5 q	20.65	6	Did not advance	
Liemarvin Bonevacia	400 metres	44.78 SB	3 Q	45.23	5	Did not advance	
Niels Laros	1500 metres	3:34.25	1 Q	3:32.74 NR	3 Q	3:31.25 NR	10
Mike Foppen	5000 metres	13:38.94	12	—N/a		Did not advance	
Abdi Nageeye	Marathon	—N/a				DNF	
Nick Smidt	400 metres hurdles	DNS	–	Did not advance			
Raphael Bouju; Taymir Burnet; Nsikak Ekpo; Hensley Paulina	4 × 100 metres relay	DNF	–	—N/a		Did not advance	
Terrence Agard; Ramsey Angela; Isayah Boers; Liemarvin Bonevacia*; Isaya Klein Ikkink	4 × 400 metres relay	3:00.23 SB	4 q	—N/a		3.00.40	6

* – Indicates the athlete competed in heats but not the final

Field events

Athlete	Event	Qualification		Final	
Athlete	Event	Distance	Position	Distance	Position
Douwe Amels	High jump	2.22	20	Did not advance	
Menno Vloon	Pole vault	5.70	=16	Did not advance	
Denzel Comenentia	Hammer throw	70.16	29	Did not advance	

Combined events – Decathlon

Athlete	Event	100 m	LJ	SP	HJ	400 m	110H	DT	PV	JT	1500 m	Final	Rank
Rik Taam	Result	10.64	7.11	14.89	1.84	47.12	14.80	43.04	4.70	57.96	4:22.70	8098	13
Rik Taam	Points	942	840	783	661	952	874	727	819	707	793	8098	13

=== Women ===
Track and road events

Athlete	Event	Heat		Semifinal		Final	
Athlete	Event	Result	Rank	Result	Rank	Result	Rank
N'Ketia Seedo	100 metres	11.11 PB	3 Q	11.17	5	Did not advance	
Tasa Jiya	200 metres	22.97	3 Q	22.67 PB	4	Did not advance	
Lieke Klaver	400 metres	50.52	1 Q	49.87	1 Q	50.33	6
Sifan Hassan	1500 metres	4:02.92	1 Q	3:55.48 SB	3 Q	3:56.00	3rd place, bronze medalist(s)
Sifan Hassan	5000 metres	14:32.29	1 Q	—N/a		14:54.11	2nd place, silver medalist(s)
Maureen Koster	5000 metres	15:05.13	8 Q	—N/a		15:00.78	12
Sifan Hassan	10,000 metres	—N/a				31:53.35	11
Diane van Es	10,000 metres	—N/a				32:05.85	13
Maayke Tjin A-Lim	100 metres hurdles	12.92	5 q	13.05	7	Did not advance	
Nadine Visser	100 metres hurdles	12.68	2 Q	12.62 SB	3	Did not advance	
Femke Bol	400 metres hurdles	53.39	1 Q	52.95	1 Q	51.70	1st place, gold medalist(s)
Cathelijn Peeters	400 metres hurdles	54.95	4 Q	54.63	5	Did not advance	
Marije van Hunenstijn*; Tasa Jiya; Lieke Klaver; Jamile Samuel*; N'Ketia Seedo; Nadine Visser	4 × 100 metres relay	42.53	4 q	—N/a		DNF	
Femke Bol; Lieke Klaver; Cathelijn Peeters; Eveline Saalberg; Lisanne de Witte*	4 × 400 metres relay	3:23.75 SB	3 Q	—N/a		3:20.72 NR	1st place, gold medalist(s)

* – Indicates the athlete competed in heats but not the final

Field events

Athlete	Event	Qualification		Final	
Athlete	Event	Distance	Position	Distance	Position
Pauline Hondema	Long jump	6.57	15	Did not advance	
Alida van Daalen	Shot put	17.93	19	Did not advance	
Jorinde van Klinken	Shot put	18.66	10 q	19.05	9
Jessica Schilder	Shot put	19.64 SB	1 Q	19.26	8
Jorinde van Klinken	Discus throw	63.20	8 q	67.20 SB	4

Combined events – Heptathlon

Athlete	Event	100H	HJ	SP	200 m	LJ	JT	800 m	Final	Rank
Sofie Dokter	Result	13.82	1.80	13.16	23.89	6.09	44.46	2:17.98	6192	11
Sofie Dokter	Points	1004	978	738	991	877	753	851	6192	11
Emma Oosterwegel	Result	13.38	1.71	14.16	24.58	6.19	54.88	2:12.06	6464	5
Emma Oosterwegel	Points	1068	867	805	926	908	955	935	6464	5
Anouk Vetter	Result	13.42	1.71	15.72	24.28	5.99	59.57	2:20.49	6501	3rd place, bronze medalist(s)
Anouk Vetter	Points	1062	867	909	954	846	1046	817	6501	3rd place, bronze medalist(s)

=== Mixed ===
Athlete	Event	Heat		Final	
Athlete	Event	Result	Rank	Result	Rank
Terrence Agard*; Femke Bol; Liemarvin Bonevacia; Lieke Klaver; Isaya Klein Ikkink	4 × 400 metres relay	3:12:12 SB	4 Q	DNF	–

* – Indicates the athlete competed in heats but not the final
