= 2023 World Athletics Championships – Women's long jump =

Women's long jump at the 2023 World Championships
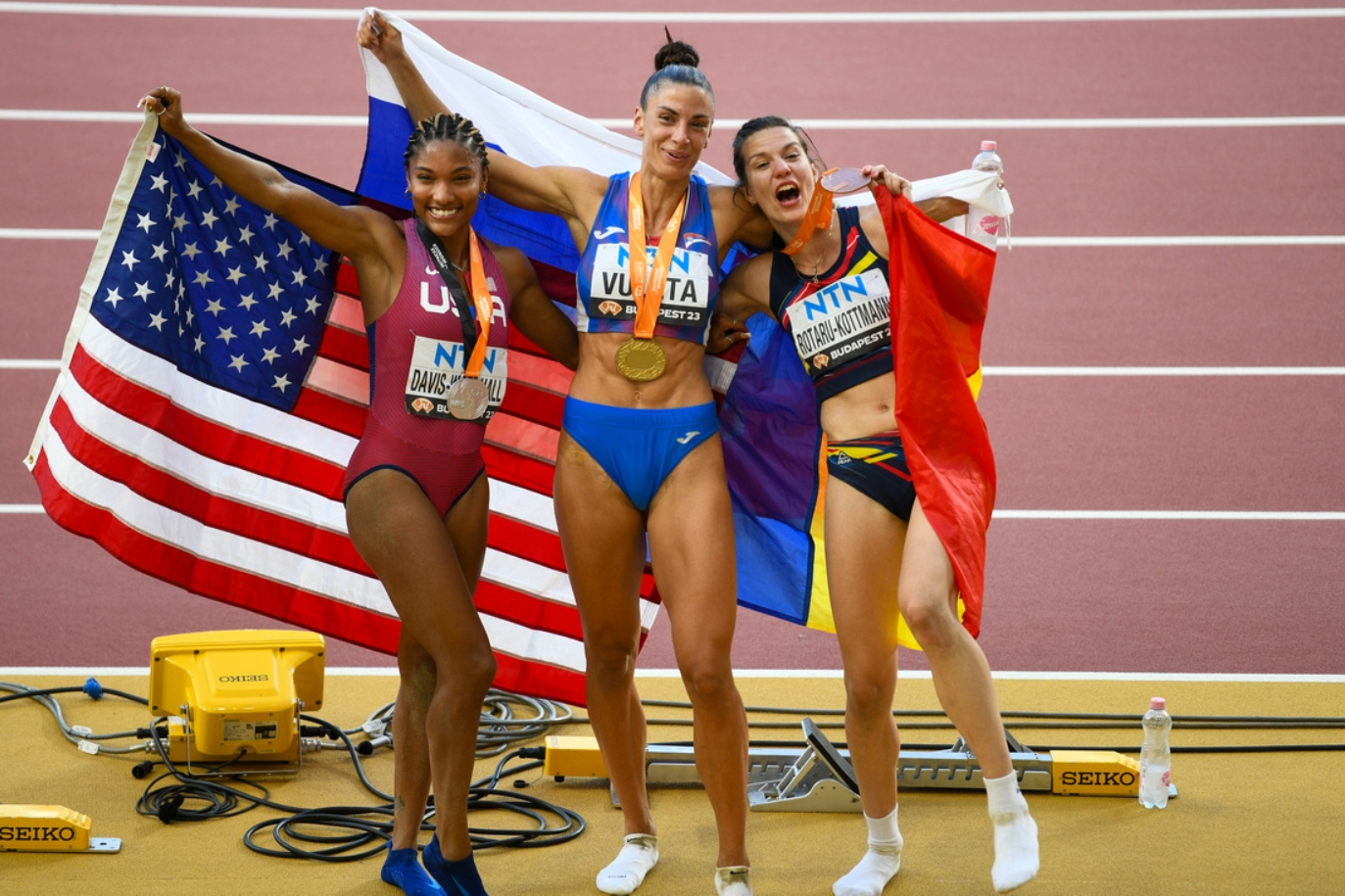
- The medalists shortly after the final.
- Venue: National Athletics Centre
- Dates: 19 August (qualification); 20 August (final)
- Competitors: 36 from 22 nations
- Winning distance: 7.14

Medalists
| gold medal | Ivana Vuleta | Serbia |
| silver medal | Tara Davis-Woodhall | United States |
| bronze medal | Alina Rotaru-Kottmann | Romania |

The women's long jump at the 2023 World Athletics Championships was held at the National Athletics Centre in Budapest on 19 and 20 August 2023.

== Summary ==
Under hot conditions Fátima Diame took the early lead with 6.82m. Several jumps later Ese Brume came close with a 6.80m. At the end of the round, Tara Davis-Woodhall popped a 6.91m. Only 5 of the first round were able to get a legal jump off. Next down the runway, Ivana Vuleta jumped 7.05m for her first legal jump to move on top of the podium. Later in the round, Brume improved her position by making 6.84m. From there, nobody was able to improve until the last jump of the fifth round, when Vuleta nailed a big one. Thinking she had fouled, Vuleta walked to the stands in frustration, but the jump was called good and measured at 7.14 m (23 ft 5 in). With her final attempt Alina Rotaru-Kottmann jumped 6.88m to leapfrog into bronze.

== Records ==
Before the competition records were as follows:

| Record | Athlete & Nat. | Perf. | Location | Date |
|---|---|---|---|---|
| World record | Galina Chistyakova (URS) | 7.52 m | Leningrad, Soviet Union | 11 June 1988 |
| Championship record | Jackie Joyner-Kersee (USA) | 7.36 m | Rome, Italy | 4 September 1987 |
| World Leading | Ackelia Smith (JAM) | 7.08 m | Norman, United States | 13 May 2023 |
| African Record | Ese Brume (NGR) | 7.17 m | Chula Vista, United States | 29 May 2021 |
| Asian Record | Yao Weili (CHN) | 7.01 m | Jinan, China | 4 June 1993 |
| North, Central American and Caribbean record | Jackie Joyner-Kersee (USA) | 7.49 m | New York, United States | 22 May 1994 |
| North, Central American and Caribbean record | Jackie Joyner-Kersee (USA) | 7.49 m | Sestriere, Italy | 31 July 1994 |
| South American Record | Maurren Higa Maggi (BRA) | 7.26 m | Bogotá, Colombia | 25 June 1999 |
| European Record | Galina Chistyakova (URS) | 7.52 m | Leningrad, Soviet Union | 11 June 1988 |
| Oceanian record | Brooke Buschkuehl (AUS) | 7.13 m | Chula Vista, United States | 9 July 2022 |

The following records were set at the competition:

| Record | Perf. | Athlete | Nat. | Date |
|---|---|---|---|---|
| World Leading | 7.14 | Ivana Vuleta | SRB | 20 Aug 2023 |

== Qualification standard ==
The standard to qualify automatically for entry was 6.85 m.

== Schedule ==
The event schedule, in local time (UTC+2), was as follows:

| Date | Time | Round |
|---|---|---|
| 19 August | 13:25 | Qualification |
| 20 August | 16:55 | Final |

== Results ==
=== Qualification ===
The qualification round took place on 19 August, in two groups, both starting at 13:25. Athletes attaining a mark of at least 6.80 metres ( Q ) or at least the 12 best performers ( q ) qualified for the final.

| Rank | Group | Name | Nationality | Round | | | Mark | Notes |
| Rank | Group | Name | Nationality | 1 | 2 | 3 | Mark | Notes |
|---|---|---|---|---|---|---|---|---|
| 1 | A | Tara Davis-Woodhall | United States | 6.87 | | | 6.87 | Q |
| 2 | A | Marthe Koala | Burkina Faso | 6.84 | | | 6.84 | Q |
| 3 | B | Ivana Vuleta | Serbia | x | 6.82 | | 6.82 | Q |
| 4 | B | Ackelia Smith | Jamaica | x | x | 6.78 | 6.78 | q |
| 5 | B | Jasmine Moore | United States | 6.61 | 6.73 | 6.63 | 6.73 | q |
| 6 | A | Larissa Iapichino | Italy | 6.73 | 6.51 | - | 6.73 | q |
| 7 | B | Leticia Oro Melo | Brazil | 6.73 | x | x | 6.73 | q, SB |
| 8 | A | Ese Brume | Nigeria | 6.65 | 6.72 | 6.69 | 6.72 | q |
| 9 | B | Alina Rotaru-Kottmann | Romania | 6.60 | 6.54 | 6.69 | 6.69 | q |
| 10 | B | Maryse Luzolo | Germany | x | 6.66 | x | 6.66 | q |
| 11 | A | Tessy Ebosele | Spain | 6.65 | 6.49 | x | 6.65 | q |
| 12 | A | Fátima Diame | Spain | x | x | 6.61 | 6.61 | q |
| 13 | B | Ruth Usoro | Nigeria | 6.50 | 6.40 | 6.60 | 6.60 | |
| 14 | B | María Vicente | Spain | 6.52 | 6.49 | 6.59 | 6.59 | |
| 15 | B | Pauline Hondema | Netherlands | 6.13 | 6.45 | 6.57 | 6.57 | |
| 16 | A | Quanesha Burks | United States | x | 6.57 | x | 6.57 | |
| 17 | B | Brooke Buschkuehl | Australia | 6.55 | 4.92 | 6.53 | 6.55 | |
| 18 | A | Milica Gardašević | Serbia | 6.51 | x | 6.45 | 6.51 | |
| 19 | B | Deborah Acquah | Ghana | 6.39 | 6.50 | 6.25 | 6.50 | |
| 20 | A | Mikaelle Assani | Germany | x | 6.47 | x | 6.47 | |
| 20 | A | Maja Askag | Sweden | x | 6.47 | x | 6.47 | |
| 22 | A | Jazmin Sawyers | Great Britain & N.I. | x | 6.41 | 6.05 | 6.41 | |
| 23 | B | Sumire Hata | Japan | x | x | 6.41 | 6.41 | |
| 24 | B | Shaili Singh | India | 6.26 | 6.40 | 6.30 | 6.40 | |
| 25 | B | Natalia Linares | Colombia | 6.38 | 6.28 | 6.35 | 6.38 | |
| 26 | B | Eliane Martins | Brazil | x | x | 6.38 | 6.38 | |
| 27 | A | Petra Banhidi-Farkas | Hungary | 6.37 | x | 6.26 | 6.37 | |
| 28 | B | Khaddi Sagnia | Sweden | 6.19 | x | 6.35 | 6.35 | |
| 29 | A | Samantha Dale | Australia | x | x | 6.35 | 6.35 | |
| 30 | A | Tissanna Hickling | Jamaica | x | 6.29 | 6.17 | 6.29 | |
| 31 | B | Diana Lesti | Hungary | 6.25 | x | 6.21 | 6.25 | |
| 32 | A | Esraa Owis | Egypt | x | x | 6.16 | 6.16 | |
| 33 | A | Lissandra Campos | Brazil | x | x | 6.01 | 6.01 | |
| 34 | A | Tilde Johansson | Sweden | x | x | 5.99 | 5.99 | |
| | A | Maryna Bekh-Romanchuk | Ukraine | x | x | x | NM | |
| | A | Hillary Kpatcha | France | x | x | x | NM | |

=== Final ===
The final was started on 20 August at 16:55.

| Rank | Name | Nationality | Round | | | | | | Mark | Notes |
| Rank | Name | Nationality | 1 | 2 | 3 | 4 | 5 | 6 | Mark | Notes |
|---|---|---|---|---|---|---|---|---|---|---|
| 1st place, gold medalist(s) | Ivana Vuleta | Serbia | x | 7.05 | x | 6.91 | 7.14 | 6.78 | 7.14 | WL, NR |
| 2nd place, silver medalist(s) | Tara Davis-Woodhall | United States | 6.91 | 6.74 | 6.62 | x | x | 6.78 | 6.91 | |
| 3rd place, bronze medalist(s) | Alina Rotaru-Kottmann | Romania | 6.51 | 6.72 | 6.63 | 6.75 | x | 6.88 | 6.88 | |
| 4 | Ese Brume | Nigeria | 6.80 | 6.84 | 6.76 | 6.53 | 6.70 | 6.59 | 6.84 | SB |
| 5 | Larissa Iapichino | Italy | x | 6.73 | x | 6.17 | x | 6.82 | 6.82 | |
| 6 | Fatima Diame | Spain | 6.82 | x | x | 4.79 | 6.52 | x | 6.82 | PB |
| 7 | Marthe Koala | Burkina Faso | x | 6.68 | 6.67 | 6.33 | 6.54 | 6.54 | 6.68 | |
| 8 | Tessy Ebosele | Spain | 6.62 | x | 6.39 | 6.33 | 6.49 | 6.50 | 6.62 | |
| 9 | Maryse Luzolo | Germany | x | x | 6.58 | | | | 6.58 | |
| 10 | Jasmine Moore | United States | x | 6.42 | 6.54 | | | | 6.54 | |
| 11 | Ackelia Smith | Jamaica | x | 6.49 | x | | | | 6.49 | |
| 12 | Leticia Oro Melo | Brazil | x | x | 6.12 | | | | 6.12 | |
