= Tom Elmer =

Swiss middle-distance runner

Personal information
- Nationality: Swiss
- Born: 1 April 1997 (age 28)

Sport
- Sport: Athletics
- Event: 1500 metres
- Club: OAC Europe

Tom Elmer (born 1 April 1997) is a Swiss middle-distance runner who competes for On. He competed in the 1500 metres at the 2023 World Athletics Championships, reaching the semi-finals. Between 2019 and 2023, Elmer became the Swiss national champion in the 1500 meters run outdoors every year and indoors in 2020, 2022 and 2023. In 2022 he also won the 3000 metres at the indoor championships.

== Personal bests ==
- 800 metres – 1:47.44 (Lausanne 2022)
  - 800 metres indoor – 1:48.11 (Erfurt 2023)
- 1500 metres – 3:34.50 (Bern 2023)
  - 1500 metres indoor – 3:39.17 (Toruń 2023)
- Mile – 3:59.06 (Lucerne 2020)
  - Mile indoor – 4:02.13 (Boston 2024)
- 3000 metres – 7:48.77 (Bellinzona 2022)
  - 3000 metres indoor – 8:04.59 (Magglingen 2022)
