= Jamaica at the 2023 World Athletics Championships =

- Flag of Jamaica
- WA code: JAM

in Budapest, Hungary 19 August 2023 – 27 August 2023
- Competitors: 68 (34 men and 34 women)
- Medals Ranked 4th: Gold 3 Silver 5 Bronze 4 Total 12

World Athletics Championships appearances
- 1983; 1987; 1991; 1993; 1995; 1997; 1999; 2001; 2003; 2005; 2007; 2009; 2011; 2013; 2015; 2017; 2019; 2022; 2023

Jamaica competed at the 2023 World Athletics Championships in Budapest, Hungary, from 19 to 27 August 2023.

== Medallists ==
Medal	Name	Event	Date
Gold	Danielle Williams	Women's 100 metres hurdles	24 August
Gold	Antonio Watson	Men's 400 metres	24 August
Gold	Shericka Jackson	Women's 200 metres	25 August
Silver	Hansle Parchment	Men's 110 metres hurdles	21 August
Silver	Shericka Jackson	Women's 100 metres	21 August
Silver	Wayne Pinnock	Men's long jump	24 August
Silver	Natasha Morrison; Shelly-Ann Fraser-Pryce; Shashalee Forbes; Shericka Jackson; Briana Williams*; Elaine Thompson-Herah*	Women's 4 × 100 metres relay	26 August
Silver	Candice McLeod; Janieve Russell; Nickisha Pryce; Stacey-Ann Williams; Charokee Young*; Shiann Salmon	Women's 4 × 400 metres relay	27 August
Bronze	Shelly-Ann Fraser-Pryce	Women's 100 metres	21 August
Bronze	Tajay Gayle	Men's long jump	24 August
Bronze	Rushell Clayton	Women's 400 metres hurdles	24 August
Bronze	Ackeem Blake; Oblique Seville; Ryiem Forde; Rohan Watson	Men's 4 × 100 metres relay	26 August

== Team ==
Jamaica entered 68 athletes.

On August 11, news was announced that Shelly-Ann Fraser-Pryce would not compete in the 200 meters event, as she is focusing on the 100 meters and winning another world title. She was replaced by Ashanti Moore.

The following athletes were part of the Jamaican team as alternates or reserves:

- Men: Ackeem Blake (100 metres) and Tyler Mason (110 metres hurdles).
- Women: Briana Williams (100 metres), Ashanti Moore (200 metres), Joanne Reid (400 metres), Amoi Brown (100 metres hurdles) and Shiann Salmon (400 metres hurdles).

== Results ==
Key

- Q = Qualified for the next round
- q = Qualified for the next round as a fastest loser or, in field events, by position without achieving the qualifying target
- NR = National record
- PB = Personal best
- SB = Season best
- N/A = Round not applicable for the event

=== Men ===
Track and road events

Athlete	Event	Heat		Semifinal		Final	
Athlete	Event	Result	Rank	Result	Rank	Result	Rank
Ryiem Forde	100 metres	10.01	2 Q	9.95 PB	3 q	10.08	8
Oblique Seville	100 metres	9.86 =PB	1 Q	9.90	1 Q	9.88	4
Rohan Watson	100 metres	10.11	2 Q	10.07	6	Did not advance	
Rasheed Dwyer	200 metres	20.40	3 Q	20.49	6	Did not advance	
Andrew Hudson	200 metres	20.25	2 Q	20.38	4 qR	20.40	8
Sean Bailey	400 metres	44.98	3 Q	44.94	2Q	44.96	5
Zandrion Barnes	400 metres	45.05	3 Q	45.38	5	Did not advance	
Antonio Watson	400 metres	44.77	1 Q	44.13 PB	1Q	44.22	1st place, gold medalist(s)
Navasky Anderson	800 metres	DQ		Did not advance			
Orlando Bennett	110 metres hurdles	13.39	5 q	13.34	4	Did not advance	
Rasheed Broadbell	110 metres hurdles	DQ		Did not advance			
Hansle Parchment	110 metres hurdles	13.30	1 Q	13.18	2 Q	13.07 SB	2nd place, silver medalist(s)
Roshawn Clarke	400 metres hurdles	48.39	3 Q	47.34 WU20R	2 Q	48.07	4
Jaheel Hyde	400 metres hurdles	48.63	2 Q	48.49	4	Did not advance	
Assinie Wilson	400 metres hurdles	DNF		Did not advance			
Ackeem Blake; Ryiem Forde; Oblique Seville; Rohan Watson	4 × 100 metres relay	37.68 SB	2 Q	—		37.76	3rd place, bronze medalist(s)
Roshawn Clarke; Zandrion Barnes; D'Andre Andrson*; Jevaughn Powell*; Antonio Watson; Rusheen McDonald	4 × 400 metres relay	2:59.82 SB	1 Q	—		2:59.34 SB	4

Field events

Athlete	Event	Qualification		Final	
Athlete	Event	Distance	Position	Distance	Position
Romaine Beckford	High jump	2.22	22	Did not advance	
Tajay Gayle	Long jump	8.12	8 q	8.27	3rd place, bronze medalist(s)
Carey McLeod	Long jump	8.19	4 Q	8.27	4
Wayne Pinnock	Long jump	8.54 WL	1 Q	8.50	2nd place, silver medalist(s)
Jaydon Hibbert	Triple jump	17.70	1 Q	NM	
Rajindra Campbell	Shot put	20.83	10 q	NM	
Fedrick Dacres	Discus throw	65.45	7 q	66.72	5
Traves Smikle	Discus throw	65.71	4 q	61.90	11
Rojé Stona	Discus throw	62.67	19	Did not advance	

=== Women ===
Track and road events

Athlete	Event	Heat		Semifinal		Final	
Athlete	Event	Result	Rank	Result	Rank	Result	Rank
Shashalee Forbes	100 metres	11.12	2 Q	11.12	6	Did not advance	
Shelly-Ann Fraser-Pryce	100 metres	11.01	1 Q	10.89	1 Q	10.77 SB	3rd place, bronze medalist(s)
Shericka Jackson	100 metres	11.06	1 Q	10.79	1 Q	10.72	2nd place, silver medalist(s)
Natasha Morrison	100 metres	11.02	2 Q	11.03	4	Did not advance	
Kevona Davis	200 metres	22.49	2 Q	22.34	5	Did not advance	
Shericka Jackson	200 metres	22.51	1 Q	22.00	1 Q	21.41 CR,PB,WL	1st place, gold medalist(s)
Ashanti Moore	200 metres	23.12	5	Did not advance			
Natalliah Whyte	200 metres	22.44	2 Q	22.52	3	Did not advance	
Candice McLeod	400 metres	50.37	3 Q	50.62	4 q	51.08	7
Nickisha Pryce	400 metres	50.38	1 Q	51.24	5	Did not advance	
Charokee Young	400 metres	51.24	6 q	51.40	6	Did not advance	
Natoya Goule	800 metres	1:59.64	2 Q	2:00.76	3	Did not advance	
Adelle Tracey	800 metres	1:59.82 SB	2 Q	1:58.99 PB	4 q	1:58.41 PB	7
Adelle Tracey	1500 metres	4:03.67	5 Q	3:58.77 NR	7	Did not advance	
Ackera Nugent	100 metres hurdles	12.60	1 Q	12.60	2 Q	12.61	5
Megan Tapper	100 metres hurdles	12.51	2 Q	12.55	4	Did not advance	
Danielle Williams	100 metres hurdles	12.51 SB	3 Q	12.50 SB	3 q	12.43 SB	1st place, gold medalist(s)
Rushell Clayton	400 metres hurdles	53.97	1 Q	53.30 PB	1 Q	52.81 PB	3rd place, bronze medalist(s)
Andrenette Knight	400 metres hurdles	54.21	2 Q	53.72	2 Q	55.20	8
Janieve Russell	400 metres hurdles	54.53	1 Q	53.69	3 q	54.24	7
Shashalee Forbes; Shelly-Ann Fraser-Pryce; Shericka Jackson; Natasha Morrison; Elaine Thompson-Herah; Briana Williams	4 × 100 metres relay	41.70 SB	1 Q	—		41.21 SB	2nd place, silver medalist(s)
Candice McLeod; Nickisha Pryce; Janieve Russell; Shiann Salmon; Stacey-Ann Williams; Charokee Young	4 × 400 metres relay	3:22.74 WL	1 Q	—		3:20.88	2nd place, silver medalist(s)

Field events

Athlete	Event	Qualification		Final	
Athlete	Event	Distance	Position	Distance	Position
Lamara Distin	High jump	1.92	3 q	1.95	5
Kimberly Williamson	High jump	1.85 =SB	28	Did not advance	
Tissanna Hickling	Long jump	6.29	30	Did not advance	
Ackelia Smith	Long jump	6.78	4 q	6.51	11
Shanieka Ricketts	Triple jump	14.67 SB	1 Q	14.93	4
Ackelia Smith	Triple jump	13.95	17	Did not advance	
Kimberly Williams	Triple jump	14.30 SB	8 Q	14.38	7
Danniel Thomas-Dodd	Shot put	19.36	6 Q	19.59	5
Samantha Hall	Discus throw	58.43	23	Did not advance	
Nayoka Clunis	Hammer throw	58.10	35	Did not advance	

=== Mixed ===
Track events

Athlete	Event	Heat		Final	
Athlete	Event	Result	Rank	Result	Rank
Demish Gaye; Natoya Goule; Malik James King; Stacey-Ann Williams	4 × 400 metres relay	3:14.05	9	Did not advance	
