= 2023 World Athletics Championships – Women's 100 metres =

Women's 100 metres at the 2023 World Championships
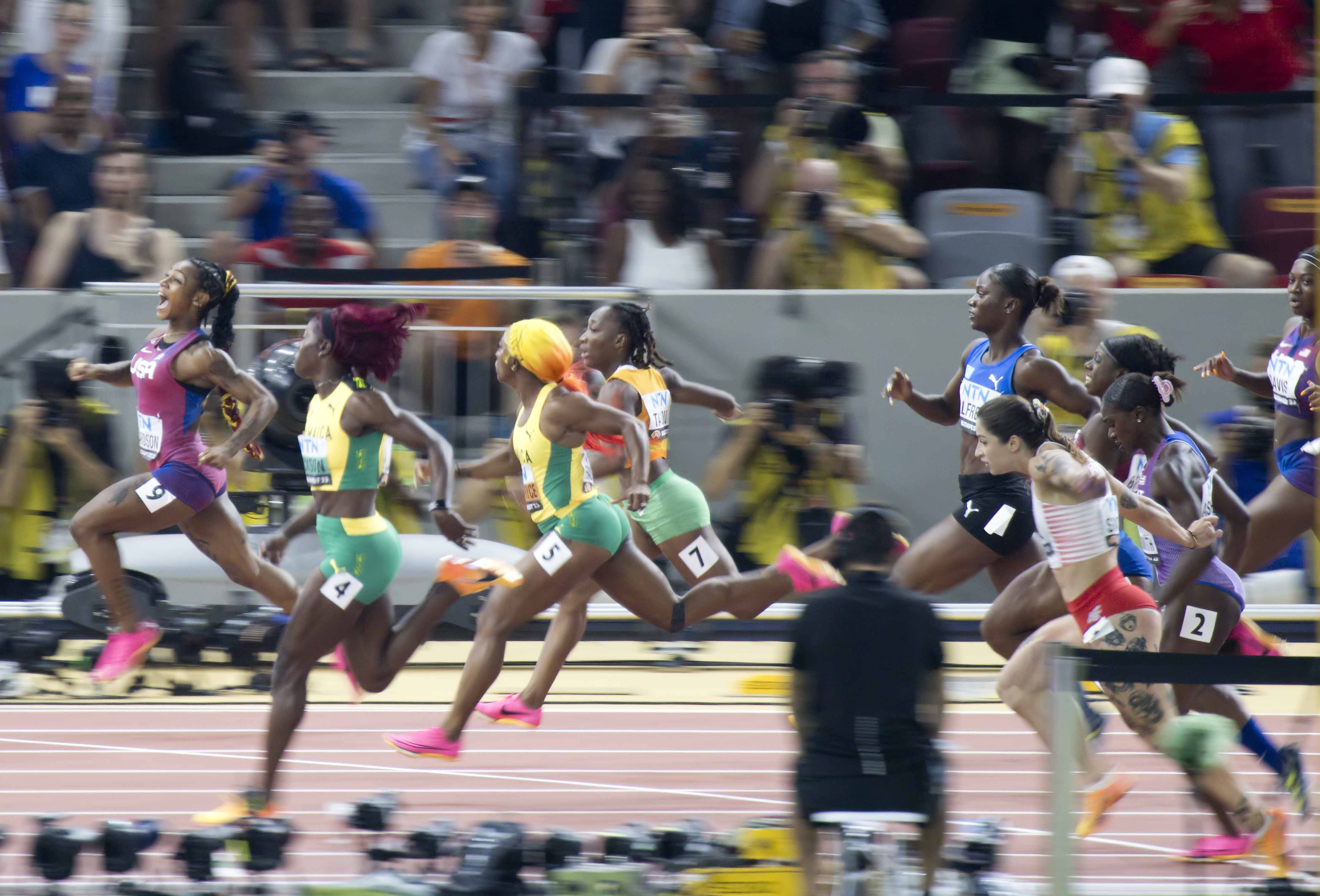
- Venue: National Athletics Centre
- Dates: 20 August (heats); 21 August (semi-final & final)
- Competitors: 56 from 38 nations
- Winning time: 10.65 CR

Medalists
gold medal	Sha'Carri Richardson	United States
silver medal	Shericka Jackson	Jamaica
bronze medal	Shelly-Ann Fraser-Pryce	Jamaica

Video on YouTube Official Video

The women's 100 metres at the 2023 World Athletics Championships was held at the National Athletics Centre in Budapest on 20 and 21 August 2023.

== Summary ==
The field had five of the fastest eight of all time: #3 defending champion Shelly-Ann Fraser-Pryce, #5 Shericka Jackson, the world leader for 2023, #7 Sha'Carri Richardson; and #8 Marie-Josée Ta Lou. In the semi-finals, Jackson, Richardson and Ta Lou were all in semi #2, with only two automatic qualifiers. Jackson and Ta Lou ended up in a virtual tie at 10.79 leaving Richardson to have to wait in the holding room. Her 10.84 easily held up but because she finished third in the semis, she was given an outside lane in the final.

In the final, the slowest qualifier Ewa Swoboda got the marginally best start, but the field got out to a fairly even start, save Richardson who was slightly behind. "Mommy Rocket” Fraser-Pryce did not get out to her typical dominating start. Over the next 30 metres, Fraser-Pryce, Jackson and Swoboda gained a slight edge on the rest of the field. Out in lane 9, Richardson recaptured the lost ground from the start to pull even with Ta Lou and Swoboda. With 40 meters to go, Jackson had gained a slight edge on Fraser-Pryce, but Swoboda had not gone away. Behind them, Julien Alfred, Ta Lou and Richardson had emerged from the others. Coming into the finish, the two Jamaican athletes were focusing on each other in the center of the track as Richardson picked off Asher-Smith, Swoboda, Ta Lou, Fraser-Pryce, and finally Jackson with 15 meters to go. Richardson crossed the line with her arms outstretched and emerged victorious by .07 seconds, Jackson in 2nd and the defending champion Fraser-Pryce in 3rd. Not only did Richardson win the World Championship, she beat Fraser-Pryce's Championship Record and tied Marion Jones and Jackson's time earlier in the season as #5 of all time.

== Records ==
Before the competition records were as follows:

Record	Athlete & Nat.	Perf.	Location	Date
World Record	Florence Griffith-Joyner (USA)	10.49	Indianapolis, United States	16 July 1988
Championship Record	Shelly-Ann Fraser-Pryce (JAM)	10.67	Eugene, United States	17 July 2022
2023 World Leading	Shericka Jackson (JAM)	10.65	Kingston, Jamaica	7 July 2023
African Record	Marie-Josée Ta Lou (CIV)	10.72	Monte Carlo, Monaco	10 August 2022
Asian Record	Xuemei Li (CHN)	10.79	Shanghai, China	18 October 1997
North, Central American and Caribbean Record	Florence Griffith-Joyner (USA)	10.49	Indianapolis, United States	16 July 1988
South American Record	Rosângela Santos (BRA)	10.91	London, United Kingdom	6 August 2017
European Record	Christine Arron (FRA)	10.73	Budapest, Hungary	19 August 1998
Oceanian Record	Zoe Hobbs (NZL)	10.96	La Chaux-de-Fonds, Switzerland	2 July 2023

The following records were set at the competition:

Record	Perf.	Athlete	Nat.	Date
Championship record	10.65	Sha'Carri Richardson	USA	21 Aug 2023
= World Leading	10.65	Sha'Carri Richardson	USA	21 Aug 2023

== Qualification standard ==
The standard to qualify automatically for entry was 11.08 seconds.

== Schedule ==
The event schedule, in local time (UTC+2), was as follows:

Date	Time	Round
20 August	12:10	Heats
21 August	20:35	Semi-finals
21 August	21:50	Final

== Results ==
=== Round 1 (heats) ===
Round 1 took place on 20 August, with the 56 athletes involved being split into 7 heats of 8 athletes each. The first 3 athletes in each heat ( Q ) and the next 3 fastest ( q ) qualified for the semi-final. The overall results were as follows:

Wind:

Rank	Heat #	Name	Nationality	Time	Notes
1	5	Sha'Carri Richardson	United States	10.92	Q
2	3	Ewa Swoboda	Poland	10.98	Q
3	1	Julien Alfred	Saint Lucia	10.99	Q
4	2	Brittany Brown	United States	11.01	Q
5	7	Shelly-Ann Fraser-Pryce	Jamaica	11.01	Q
6	5	Natasha Morrison	Jamaica	11.02	Q
7	1	Daryll Neita	Great Britain & N.I.	11.03	Q
8	2	Dina Asher-Smith	Great Britain & N.I.	11.04	Q
9	3	Tamari Davis	United States	11.06	Q
10	4	Shericka Jackson	Jamaica	11.06	Q
11	7	Mujinga Kambundji	Switzerland	11.08	Q
12	6	Marie-Josée Ta Lou	Ivory Coast	11.08	Q
13	1	Gina Bass	Gambia	11.10	Q
14	3	N'Ketia Seedo	Netherlands	11.11	Q, PB
15	6	Shashalee Forbes	Jamaica	11.12	Q
16	5	Zaynab Dosso	Italy	11.14	Q, =NR
17	7	Zoe Hobbs	New Zealand	11.14	Q
18	4	Michelle-Lee Ahye	Trinidad and Tobago	11.16	Q, SB
19	3	Rani Rosius	Belgium	11.18	q, PB
19	6	Boglárka Takács	Hungary	11.18	Q
21	4	Gina Lückenkemper	Germany	11.21	Q
22	4	Rosemary Chukwuma	Nigeria	11.24	q
23	1	Géraldine Frey	Switzerland	11.26	q
24	5	Maboundou Koné	Ivory Coast	11.26	
25	2	Jaël Bestué	Spain	11.28	Q
26	7	Lorène Dorcas Bazolo	Portugal	11.29	
27	7	Khamica Bingham	Canada	11.29	
28	3	Murielle Ahouré-Demps	Ivory Coast	11.29	
29	3	Leah Bertrand	Trinidad and Tobago	11.32	
30	5	Krystsina Tsimanouskaya	Poland	11.32	
31	2	Veronica Shanti Pereira	Singapore	11.33	
32	2	Halle Hazzard	Grenada	11.34	SB
33	6	Patrizia van der Weken	Luxembourg	11.38	
34	4	Olivia Fotopoulou	Cyprus	11.38	
35	1	Delphine Nkansa	Belgium	11.40	
36	6	Bree Masters	Australia	11.43	
36	7	Rebekka Haase	Germany	11.43	
38	6	Magdalena Stefanowicz	Poland	11.43	
39	5	Torrie Lewis	Australia	11.45	
40	6	Arialis Gandulla	Portugal	11.47	
41	1	Ángela Gabriela Tenorio	Ecuador	11.52	
42	4	Vitoria Cristina Rosa	Brazil	11.57	
43	4	Natacha Ngoye Akamabi	Congo	11.60	
44	1	Farzaneh Fasihi	Iran	11.63	
45	7	Arisa Kimishima	Japan	11.73	
46	3	Mudhawi Alshammari	Kuwait	11.93	
47	2	Salomé Kora	Switzerland	12.18	
48	4	Kesaia Boletakanakandavu	Fiji	12.46	PB
49	3	Silina Pha Aphay	Laos	12.67	
50	2	Chloe David	Vanuatu	12.88	
51	1	Zarinae Sapong	Northern Mariana Islands	13.04	SB
52	6	Jovita Arunia	Solomon Islands	13.20	SB
53	5	Sydney Francisco	Palau	13.48	PB
54	7	Yara Ahmed Abuljadayel	Saudi Arabia	13.54	
	5	Imani Lansiquot	Great Britain & N.I.	DQ	TR 16.8
	2	Yunisleidy García	Cuba	DQ	TR 16.8

=== Semi-final ===
The semi-final took place on 21 August, with the 24 athletes involved being split into 3 heats of 8 athletes each (using lanes 2 to 9). The first 2 athletes in each heat ( Q ) and the next 2 fastest ( q ) qualified for the final. The overall results were as follows:

Wind:
Heat 1: −0.4 m/s, Heat 2: −0.4 m/s, Heat 3: −0.1 m/s

Rank	Heat #	Lane	Name	Nationality	Time	Notes
1	2	7	Marie-Josée Ta Lou	Ivory Coast	10.79	Q
1	2	5	Shericka Jackson	Jamaica	10.79	Q
3	2	6	Sha'Carri Richardson	United States	10.84	q
4	1	7	Shelly-Ann Fraser-Pryce	Jamaica	10.89	Q
5	3	5	Julien Alfred	Saint Lucia	10.92	Q
6	3	4	Brittany Brown	United States	10.97	Q
7	1	6	Tamari Davis	United States	10.98	Q
8	1	5	Ewa Swoboda	Poland	11.01	q
8	3	7	Dina Asher-Smith	Great Britain & N.I.	11.01	q
10	2	8	Zoe Hobbs	New Zealand	11.02	
11	1	4	Daryll Neita	Great Britain & N.I.	11.03	
12	3	6	Natasha Morrison	Jamaica	11.03	
13	2	4	Mujinga Kambundji	Switzerland	11.04	SB
14	2	3	Shashalee Forbes	Jamaica	11.12	
15	3	8	N'Ketia Seedo	Netherlands	11.17	
16	1	2	Gina Lückenkemper	Germany	11.18	
16	1	3	Michelle-Lee Ahye	Trinidad and Tobago	11.18	
18	3	3	Gina Bass	Gambia	11.19	
19	1	8	Zaynab Dosso	Italy	11.19	
20	3	2	Rani Rosius	Belgium	11.20	
21	2	9	Jaël Bestué	Spain	11.25	
22	1	9	Rosemary Chukwuma	Nigeria	11.26	
23	2	2	Boglárka Takács	Hungary	11.26	
24	3	9	Géraldine Frey	Switzerland	11.28	

=== Final ===
The final started at 21:50 on 21 August. The results were as follows:

Wind: +0.8 m/s

Rank	Lane	Name	Nationality	Time	Notes
1st place, gold medalist(s)	9	Sha'Carri Richardson	United States	10.65	CR, PB, =WL
2nd place, silver medalist(s)	4	Shericka Jackson	Jamaica	10.72	
3rd place, bronze medalist(s)	5	Shelly-Ann Fraser-Pryce	Jamaica	10.77	SB
4	7	Marie-Josée Ta Lou	Ivory Coast	10.81	
5	6	Julien Alfred	Saint Lucia	10.93	
6	1	Ewa Swoboda	Poland	10.97	
7	3	Brittany Brown	United States	10.97	
8	2	Dina Asher-Smith	Great Britain & N.I.	11.00	
9	8	Tamari Davis	United States	11.03	
