= Julian Ranc =

French middle-distance runner

Personal information
- Nationality: France
- Born: 14 September 1996 (age 29)

Sport
- Sport: Athletics
- Event(s): 800 metres, 1500 metres

Julian Ranc (born 14 September 1996) is a French middle-distance runner. He competed in the 1500 metres at the 2023 World Athletics Championships. He also finished third in the 800 metres at the 2020 French Athletics Championships.

== Personal bests ==
- 800 metres – 1:47.71 (Weinheim 2017)
  - 800 metres indoor – 1:49.55 (Metz 2018)
- 1500 metres – 3:33.90 (Tomblaine 2023)
  - 1500 metres indoor – 3:39.95 (Metz 2022)
