= Vanessa Grimm =

Australian journalist

- Education: Bond University
- Occupation: Newsreader
- Years active: 1997 – present
- Employer: Sky News Australia
- Known for: Journalism, TV presenting
- Website: Vanessa Grimm profile

Vanessa Grimm (née Trezise) is an Australian journalist currently serving as a news presenter for Sky News Australia.

== Career ==
Early in her career, Grimm worked as a researcher for ABC program The 7.30 Report, and as a reporter for Prime News in both Newcastle and the Gold Coast. In 2000, Grimm was the courts and crime reporter for NBN News, before presenting that station's late news bulletin. In 2002, Grimm joined the Nine Network before joining Sky News Australia in 2003, serving as a producer of flagship program Agenda.

At Sky News, Grimm has served as presenter of multiple programs, including breakfast program First Edition. She is now the weekend daytime news presenter.

While presenting a news bulletin in November 2015, a man used offensive terms during a live cross to a female reporter, to which Grimm apologised to viewers and suggesting the offending man "take a good hard look at [himself]".

Grimm had a small cameo role in 2005 film Stealth, playing a newsreader.

== Personal life ==
Grimm is married to husband Nick Grimm, and the couple have four children.
