= Auriana Lazraq-Khlass =

French athlete (born 1999)

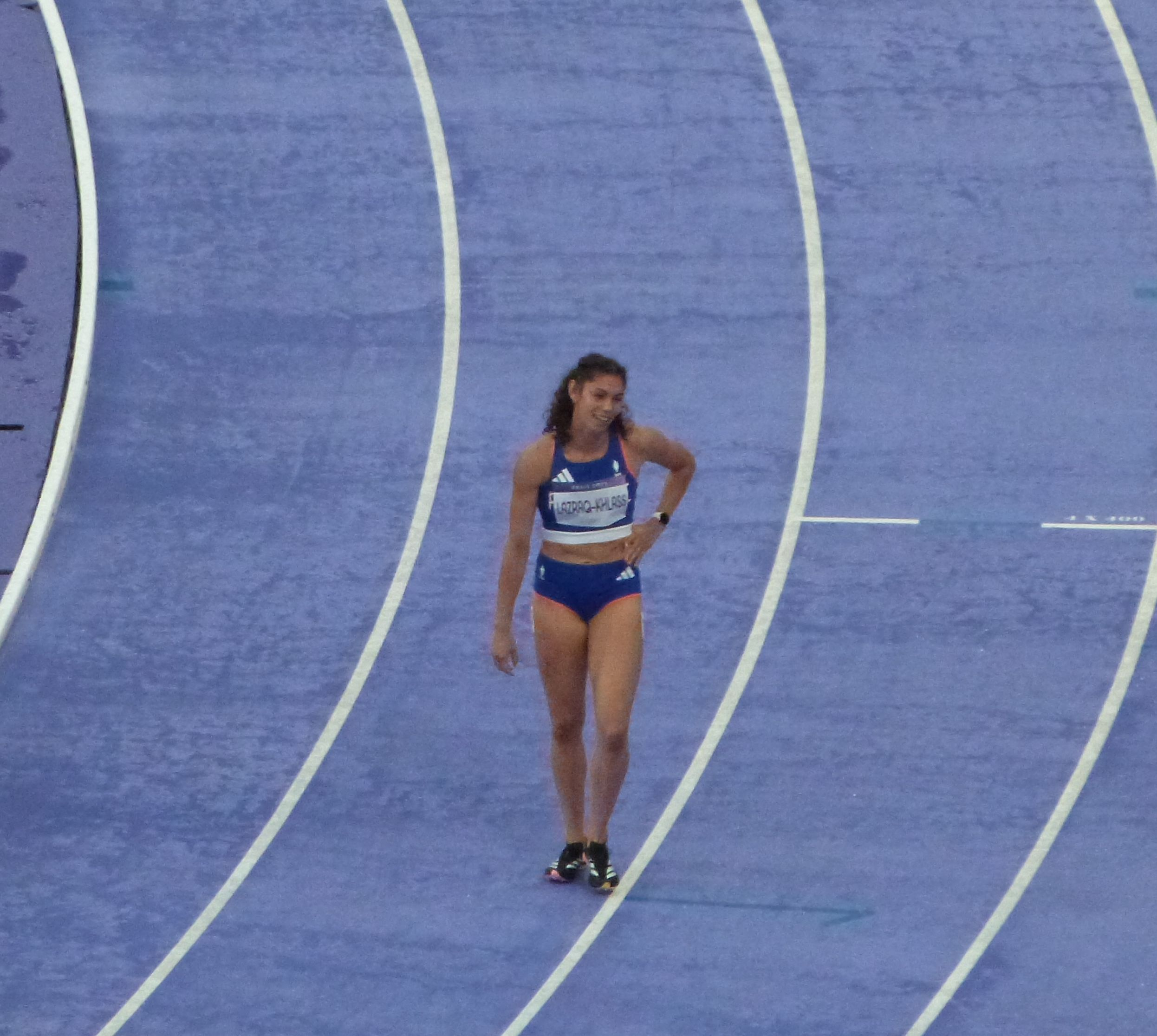
- Lazraq-Khlass at the 2024 Olympics

Personal information
- Born: 22 April 1999 (age 27) Pithiviers, France
- Height: 179 cm (5 ft 10 in)
- Weight: 71 kg (157 lb)

Sport
- Country: France
- Sport: Athletics
- Event: Heptathlon

Achievements and titles
- Personal bests: Heptathlon: 6635 (Rome, 2024)
Medal record
Women's athletics
Representing France
European Championships
Silver medal – second place	2024 Rome	Heptathlon

Auriana Lazraq-Khlass (born 22 April 1999) is a French track and field athlete who competes in multi-events. She won the French Athletics Championships in the Heptathlon in 2024, and won the silver medal at the 2024 European Athletics Championships.

Lazraq-Khlass is serving a 22-month suspension from athletics for anti-doping whereabouts failures from March 2026.

== Early life ==
She was born in Pithiviers, Loiret before her family moved to Marly near Metz in the Moselle department. She started athletics at the age of five years-old after being inspired by the 2004 Olympic Games in Athens. She later moved to Montpellier to train before returning to Metz during the Coronavirus pandemic. She began to train full-time in athletics in 2022, with Julien Choffart as her coach.

== Career ==
Lazraq-Klass recorded a new Pentathlon personal best score in Clermont of 4394 in January 2023.

She recorded a new Heptathlon personal best in Montpellier when she recorded over 6000 points for the first time in May 2023. She was runner-up at the French national championships in the Heptathlon in Albi in July 2023 with a new personal best tally of 6153 points. She was selected to compete at the 2023 World Athletics Championships in Budapest in August 2023. She scored a new personal best score of 6179 points and finished twelfth overall.

She won the French national championships in the Heptathlon in Oyonnax in May 2024 with a personal best tally of 6209 points. She was a silver medalist in the heptathlon at the 2024 European Athletics Championships in Rome, setting five individual personal bests during the competition, and scoring a total personal best of 6635 points. She competed in the heptathlon at the 2024 Summer Olympics in Paris, finishing in sixteenth place overall.

She had a delayed start to her 2025 season, having to overcome a stress fracture to her heel, a tropical parasite, surgery on her right shoulder and plantar fasciitis. After returning to competition she scored 5,888 points for the heptathlon in Laval in July 2025. In September 2025, she completed the heptathlon at the 2025 World Championships in Tokyo, Japan, placing eighteenth.

She won the pentathlon title at the 2026 French Indoor Athletics Championships in Aubiere, with a personal best tally of 4634 points. On 30 March 2026, the Athletics Integrity Unit announced that Lazraq-Khlass had been given a provisional suspension from athletics for anti-doping whereabouts failures between February and November 2025. She subsequently received a 22 month ban, dated from 23 March 2026 with results wiped from November 2025. The disciplinary tribunal stated that Lazraq-Khlass "did not appear to be attempting to evade testing" but had nevertheless displayed "carelessness and negligence".

== Personal bests ==
Heptathlon
Event	Performance	Place	Meeting	Date
100 metres hurdles	13 s 35	Rome	2024 European Athletics Championships	7 June 2024
High jump	1.77m	Rome	2024 European Athletics Championships	7 June 2024
Shot put	15.27m	Rome	2024 European Athletics Championships	7 June 2024
200 metres	23 s 56	Rome	2024 European Athletics Championships	7 June 2024
Long jump	6.38m	Montpellier	Meeting National à thème Défi Athlon de Montpellier	30 May 2021
Javelin	48.23m	Rome	2024 European Athletics Championships	8 June 2024
800 metres	2 min 12 s 07	Rome	2024 European Athletics Championships	8 June 2024
Heptathlon	6635 pts	Rome	2024 European Athletics Championships	8 June 2024
