= Rita Nemes =

Hungarian athlete (born 1989)

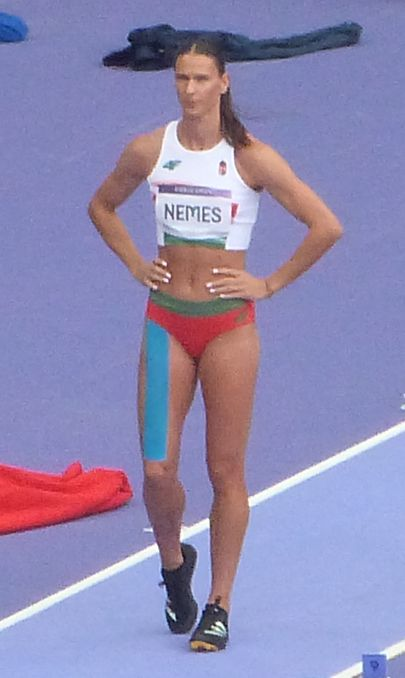
Rita Nemes during the heptathlon (long jump) at the 2024 Olympic Games

Rita Nemes (born 30 November 1989) is a Hungarian athlete who competes in the pentathlon. She finished in 6th place in the women's pentathlon at the 2021 European Athletics Indoor Championships.
