= Fanni Rapai =

Hungarian athlete

Personal information
- Nationality: Hungarian
- Born: 7 January 2000 (age 26)

Sport
- Sport: Athletics
- Event: Sprint

Achievements and titles
- Personal best(s): 200m: 24.16 (Budapest, 2023); 400m: 52.73 (Budapest, 2023)

Fanni Rapai (born 7 January 2000) is a Hungarian track and field athlete who competes as a sprinter. She represented her country at the 2023 World Athletics Championships in the 400 metres. That year, she was part of a team that ran a new Hungarian indoor national record in the women's 4 x 400 meters relay.

== Career ==
Rapai is a member of Ikarus BSE in Budapest. In March 2018, she won a bronze medal at the Hungarian junior indoor championships in the 400 metres.

In February 2022, Rapai ran an indoor 400 metres personal best when she ran a time of 55.22 seconds in Budapest. Rapai ran as part of the Hungarian 4 x 400 metres relay team at the 2022 European Athletics Championships in Munich, Germany, in August 2022.

In January 2023, Rapai along with Evelin Nádházy, Sára Mátó, and Janka Molnár, ran a new indoor national record in the 4 x 400 meters, running 3:37.11 in Nyíregyháza.

In June 2023, she was part of the Hungary team that participated at the 2023 European Team Championships in Poland, and achieved promotion by winning Division Two. In July 2023, she ran a new 400 metres personal best time of 53.32 seconds at the 2023 Hungarian Athletics Championships. She was selected for the 2023 World Athletics Championships in Budapest in August 2023 where she ran a new personal best of 52.73 seconds for the 400 metres but did not proceed to the semi-final.

She ran as part of the Hungarian mixed 4 × 400 m relay team that competed at the 2024 World Relays Championships in Nassau, Bahamas in May 2024.
