= 2025 Asian Athletics Championships – Women's 3000 metres steeplechase =

Women's 3000 metres steeplechase at the 2025 Asian Athletics Championships
- Venue: Gumi Civic Stadium
- Location: Gumi, South Korea
- Dates: 30 May
- Competitors: 13 from 7 nations
- Winning time: 9:10.46 CR

Medalists
gold medal	Norah Jeruto	Kazakhstan
silver medal	Parul Chaudhary	India
bronze medal	Daisy Jepkemei	Kazakhstan

The women's 3000 metres steeplechase event at the 2025 Asian Athletics Championships was held on 30 May.

== Records ==
Records before the 2025 Asian Athletics Championships
Record	Athlete (nation)	Time (s)	Location	Date
World record	Beatrice Chepkoech (KEN)	8:44.32	Fontvieille, Monaco	20 July 2018
Asian record	Winfred Yavi (BHR)	8:44.39	Rome, Italy	30 August 2024
Championship record	Lalita Babar (IND)	9:34.13	Wuhan, China	6 June 2015
World leading	Faith Cherotich (KEN)	9:05.08	Doha, Qatar	16 May 2025
Asian leading	Winfred Yavi (BHR)	9:05.26	Doha, Qatar	16 May 2025

== Schedule ==
The event schedule, in local time (UTC+9), was as follows:

Date	Time	Round
30 May	19:00	Final

== Results ==
Place	Athlete	Nation	Time	Notes
1st place, gold medalist(s)	Norah Jeruto	Kazakhstan	9:10.46	CR
2nd place, silver medalist(s)	Parul Chaudhary	India	9:12.46	NR
3rd place, bronze medalist(s)	Daisy Jepkemei	Kazakhstan	9:27.51	
4	Miu Saitou	Japan	9:38.16	PB
5	Ankita Dhyani	India	9:41.54	
6	Manami Nishiyama	Japan	9:52.35	
7	Cho Ha-rim	South Korea	9:53.09	PB
8	Xu Shuangshuang	China	10:04.96	
9	Dilshoda Usmanova	Uzbekistan	10:06.62	PB
10	Nam Bour-ha-na	South Korea	10:14.90	PB
11	Choi Soo-ah	South Korea	10:32.99	
12	Sadafbonu Nusratilleva	Uzbekistan	10:48.22	
13	Haya Mohamed Al-Tawager	Kuwait	12:12.79	PB
