= 2019 Asian Athletics Championships – Women's 3000 metres steeplechase =

Women's 3000 metres steeplechase at the 2019 Asian Athletics Championships
- Venue: Khalifa International Stadium
- Location: Doha, Qatar
- Dates: 23 April
- Competitors: 12 from 8 nations
- Winning time: 9:46.18

Medalists
gold medal	Winfred Mutile Yavi	Bahrain
silver medal	Xu Shuangshuang	China
bronze medal	Tigest Getent	Bahrain

The women's 3000 metres steeplechase at the 2019 Asian Athletics Championships was held on 23 April.

== Records ==
Records before the 2019 Asian Athletics Championships
Record	Athlete (nation)	Time (s)	Location	Date
World record	Beatrice Chepkoech (KEN)	8:44.32	Fontvieille, Monaco	20 July 2018
Asian record	Ruth Jebet (BHR)	8:52.78	Paris, France	27 July 2016
Championship record	Lalita Babar (IND)	9:34.13	Wuhan, China	6 June 2015
World leading	Fancy Cherono (KEN)	9:39.40	Nairobi, Kenya	21 March 2019
Asian leading	Nilani Rathnayaka (SRI)	9:55.15	Colombo, Sri Lanka	22 March 2019

== Results ==
Rank	Name	Nationality	Time	Notes
1st place, gold medalist(s)	Winfred Mutile Yavi	Bahrain	9:46.18	SB
2nd place, silver medalist(s)	Xu Shuangshuang	China	9:51.76	SB
3rd place, bronze medalist(s)	Tigest Getent	Bahrain	9:53.96	
4	Nilani Rathnayake	Sri Lanka	9:58.55	
5	Parul Chaudhary	India	10:03.43	PB
6	Yukari Ishizawa	Japan	10:06.55	
7	Ro Hyo Gyong	North Korea	10:08.00	SB
8	Nguyễn Thị Ánh	Vietnam	10:08.45	SB
9	Ju Ok Byol	North Korea	10:11.11	PB
10	Yui Yabuta	Japan	10:14.00	
11	Tatyana Neroznak	Kazakhstan	10:25.56	NR
12	Zhang Xinyan	China	10:44.36	SB
