= 2023 Asian Athletics Championships – Women's 3000 metres steeplechase =

Women's 3000 metres steeplechase at the 2023 Asian Athletics Championships
- Venue: National Stadium
- Location: Bangkok, Thailand
- Dates: 14 July
- Competitors: 9 from 7 nations
- Winning time: 9:38.76

Medalists
gold medal	Parul Chaudhary	India
silver medal	Xu Shuangshuang	China
bronze medal	Reimi Yoshimura	Japan

The women's 3000 metres steeplechase event at the 2023 Asian Athletics Championships was held on 14 July.

== Records ==
Records before the 2023 Asian Athletics Championships
Record	Athlete (nation)	Time (s)	Location	Date
World record	Beatrice Chepkoech (KEN)	8:44.32	Fontvieille, Monaco	20 July 2018
Asian record	Ruth Jebet (BHR)	8:52.78	Paris, France	27 July 2016
Championship record	Lalita Babar (IND)	9:34.13	Wuhan, China	6 June 2015
World leading	Sembo Almayew (ETH)	9:34.13	Florence, Italy	2 June 2023
Asian leading	Winfred Yavi (BHR)	9:04.38	Doha, Qatar	5 May 2023

== Results ==
Rank	Name	Nationality	Time	Notes
1st place, gold medalist(s)	Parul Chaudhary	India	9:38.76	
2nd place, silver medalist(s)	Xu Shuangshuang	China	9:44.54	
3rd place, bronze medalist(s)	Reimi Yoshimura	Japan	9:48.48	
4	Preeti Lamba	India	9:48.50	
5	Chikako Mori	Japan	9:56.67	
6	Nguyễn Thị Oanh	Vietnam	10:09.62	
7	Daisy Jepkemei	Kazakhstan	10:19.19	
8	Dilshoda Usmanova	Uzbekistan	10:45.05	
9	Joida Gagnao	Philippines	11:38.38	
