= Athletics at the 2024 Summer Olympics – Women's 3000 metres steeplechase =

Women's 3000 metres steeplechase at the Games of the XXXIII Olympiad
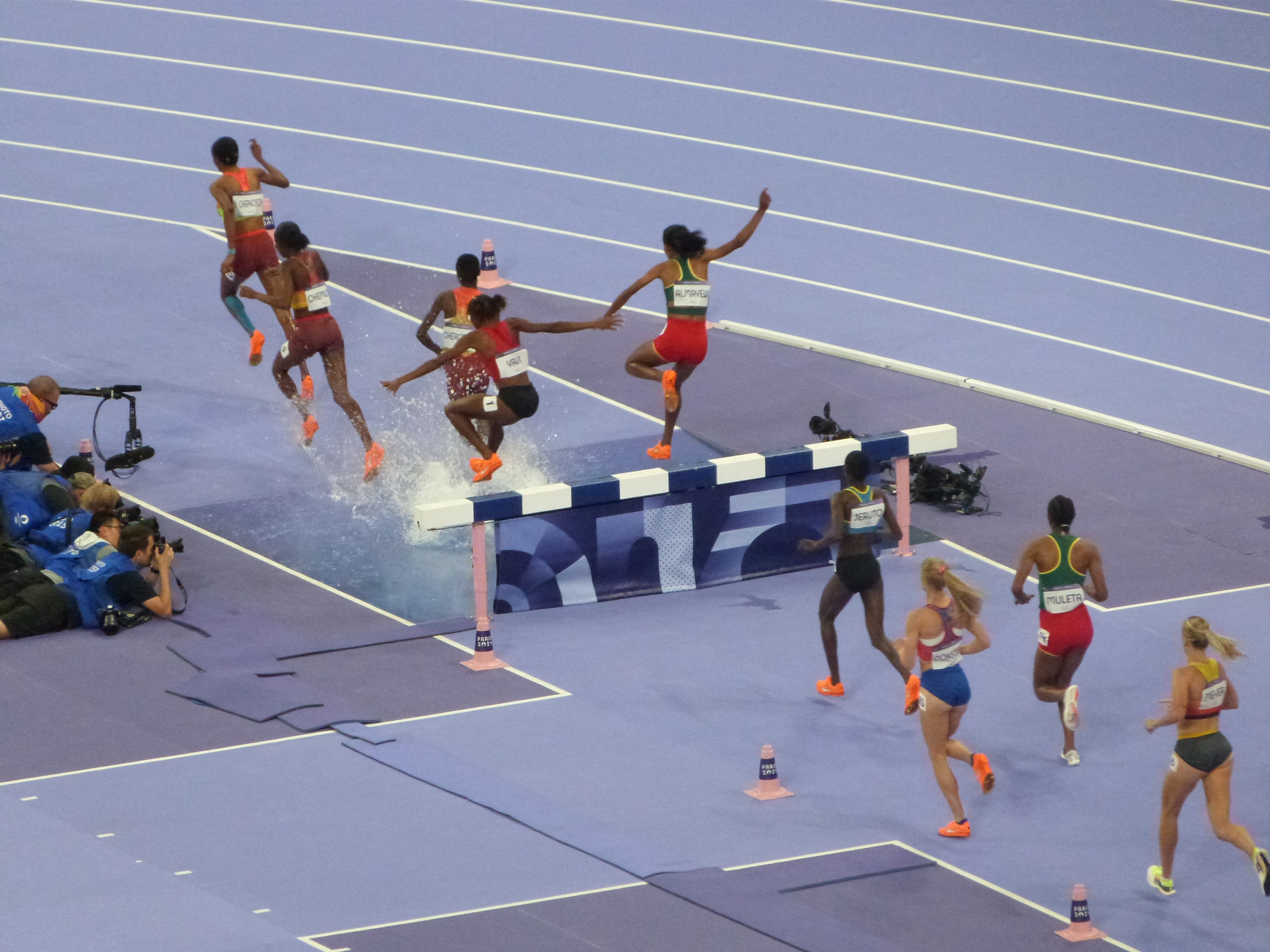
- The final of the event.
- Venue: Stade de France, Paris, France
- Dates: 4 August 2024 (round 1); 6 August 2024 (final)
- Winning time: 8:52.76 OR

Medalists
1st place, gold medalist(s)		Winfred Yavi	Bahrain
2nd place, silver medalist(s)		Peruth Chemutai	Uganda
3rd place, bronze medalist(s)		Faith Cherotich	Kenya

The women's 3000 metres steeplechase at the 2024 Summer Olympics was held in two rounds at the Stade de France in Paris, France, on 4 and 6 August 2024. This was fifth time that the women's 3000 metres steeplechase was contested at the Summer Olympics. A total of 36 athletes qualified for the event by entry standard or ranking.

The winning margin was 0.58 seconds - the first time the women's steeplechase was won by less than a second at the Olympics.

== Summary ==
Defending champion Peruth Chemutai returns as the world leader for the season, barely ahead of world record holder Beatrice Chepkoech who is also the 2019 world champion and 2023 silver medalist. 2023 gold medalist Winfred Yavi also entered. Those three athletes were the individual heat winners. 2022 world champion was Norah Jeruto, 2019 bronze Gesa Krause and 2023 bronze Faith Cherotich but the rest of the recent podiums were missing. Valerie Constien, Faith Cherotich, Alice Finot and Courtney Wayment were high on the world list.

From the gun, a pack of Chemutai, Chepkoech, Cherotich and Sembo Almayew went to the front with Chemutai on point. After the four formed a break a lap into the race, Yavi, on the front of the second group, bridged the small gap to tag onto the back of the pack. Chepkoech took over the lead for the next three laps, when Chemutai moved up again. Almayew moved up to her shoulder. Yavi moved up around a struggling Cherotich to stay in contact. With two laps to go, Almayew struggled to keep pace and Yavi moved up again. At the bell Chemutai, Chepkoech and Yavi were in a close pack in that order. Through the turn, Yavi moved up behind Chemutai. Down the backstretch, those two separated. Chepkoech was broken, Cherotich went by. Through the final water jump Chemutai held the inside line and the advantage. Behind them Alice Finot, running fastest of all of them, picked off Alamyew and a fading Chepkoech, setting her sights on Cherotich. Going in to the final barrier, Yavi got past Chemutai but then stutter-stepped, both jumping high over the barrier together. Who would have the speed at the end? At first it looked like Chemutai had the advantage, but not known as a fast finisher, Yavi exhibited better sprint form and speed, pulling away for the gold. Cherotich held off Finot for bronze.

It was a new Olympic Record for Yavi, the #4 performance of all time (though she already holds #2). Chemutai improved upon her own National Record. Cherotich moved up to #13 and the #7 performer. Finot was #23, #11 performer and the European Record plus the French record at home. Even further back Elizabeth Bird became the #19 performer with a new British Record and Lomi Muleta became #22.

== Background ==
The women's 3000 metres steeplechase debutted at the 2008 Olympics.

Global records before the 2024 Summer Olympics
Record	Athlete (Nation)	Time (s)	Location	Date
World record	Beatrice Chepkoech (KEN)	8:44.32	Fontvieille, Monaco	20 July 2018
Olympic record	Gulnara Galkina (RUS)	8:58.81	Beijing, China	17 August 2008
World leading	Peruth Chemutai (UGA)	8:55.09	Eugene, United States	25 May 2024

Area records before the 2024 Summer Olympics
Area Record	Athlete (Nation)	Time (s)
Africa (records)	Beatrice Chepkoech (KEN)	8:44.32 WR
Asia (records)	Winfred Yavi (BHR)	8:50.66
Europe (records)	Gulnara Galkina (RUS)	8:58.81
North, Central America and Caribbean (records)	Courtney Frerichs (USA)	8:57.77
Oceania (records)	Genevieve Lacaze (AUS)	9:14.28
South America (records)	Tatiane Raquel da Silva (BRA)	9:24.38

The following records were set during the event:

Country	Athlete	Round	Time	Notes
Bahrain	Winfred Yavi	Final	8:52.76	OR

== Qualification ==
For the women's 3000 metres steeplechase event, the qualification period was between 1 July 2023 and 30 June 2024. 36 athletes were able to qualify for the event, with a maximum of three athletes per nation, by running the entry standard of 9:23.00 seconds or faster or by their World Athletics Ranking for this event.

== Results ==
=== Round 1 ===
Round 1 was held on 4 August, starting at 10:05 (UTC+2) in the morning.

==== Heat 1 ====
Rank	Athlete	Nation	Time	Notes
1	Peruth Chemutai	Uganda	9:10.51	Q
2	Faith Cherotich	Kenya	9:10.57	Q
3	Gesa Krause	Germany	9:10.68	Q, SB
4	Courtney Wayment	United States	9:10.72	Q
5	Lomi Muleta	Ethiopia	9:10.73	Q, PB
6	Marwa Bouzayani	Tunisia	9:10.91	PB
7	Carolina Robles	Spain	9:22.48	
8	Parul Chaudhary	India	9:23.39	SB
9	Aneta Konieczek	Poland	9:24.43	PB
10	Daisy Jepkemei	Kazakhstan	9:24.69	
11	Aimee Pratt	Great Britain	9:27.26	SB
12	Regan Yee	Canada	9:27.81	

==== Heat 2 ====
Rank	Athlete	Nation	Time	Notes
1	Winfred Yavi	Bahrain	9:15.11	Q
2	Sembo Almayew	Ethiopia	9:15.42	Q
3	Valerie Constien	United States	9:16.33	Q
4	Elizabeth Bird	Great Britain	9:16.46	Q
5	Norah Jeruto	Kazakhstan	9:16.46	Q, SB
6	Olivia Gürth	Germany	9:16.47	PB
7	Ceili McCabe	Canada	9:20.71	
8	Kinga Królik	Poland	9:26.61	PB
9	Luiza Gega	Albania	9:27.41	
10	Flavie Renouard	France	9:27.70	SB
11	Cara Feain-Ryan	Australia	9:28.72	PB
12	Jackline Chepkoech	Kenya	9:35.56	

==== Heat 3 ====
Rank	Athlete	Nation	Time	Notes
1	Beatrice Chepkoech	Kenya	9:13.56	Q
2	Alice Finot	France	9:14.78	Q
3	Lea Meyer	Germany	9:14.85	Q, PB
4	Alicja Konieczek	Poland	9:16.51	Q, NR
5	Irene Sánchez-Escribano	Spain	9:17.39	Q, PB
6	Ilona Mononen	Finland	9:22.77	NR
7	Marisa Howard	United States	9:24.78	
8	Stella Rutto	Romania	9:31.23	
9	Amy Cashin	Australia	9:32.93	
10	Tatiane Raquel da Silva	Brazil	9:33.96	SB
11	Belén Casetta	Argentina	9:34.78	
12	Xu Shuangshuang	China	9:43.50	

=== Final ===
The final was held on 6 August, starting at 21:10 (UTC+2) in the evening.

Rank	Athlete	Nation	Time	Notes
1st place, gold medalist(s)	Winfred Yavi	Bahrain	8:52.76	OR
2nd place, silver medalist(s)	Peruth Chemutai	Uganda	8:53.34	NR
3rd place, bronze medalist(s)	Faith Cherotich	Kenya	8:55.15	PB
4	Alice Finot	France	8:58.67	ER
5	Sembo Almayew	Ethiopia	9:00.83	SB
6	Beatrice Chepkoech	Kenya	9:04.24	
7	Elizabeth Bird	Great Britain	9:04.35	NR
8	Lomi Muleta	Ethiopia	9:06.07	PB
9	Norah Jeruto	Kazakhstan	9:08.97	SB
10	Lea Meyer	Germany	9:09.59	PB
11	Irene Sánchez-Escribano	Spain	9:10.43	PB
12	Courtney Wayment	United States	9:13.60	
13	Alicja Konieczek	Poland	9:21.31	
14	Gesa Felicitas Krause	Germany	9:26.96	
15	Valerie Constien	United States	9:34.08	
