= Athletics at the 2026 Asian Games – Women's 5000 metres =

Women's 5000 metres at the 2026 Asian Games
- Venue: Mizuho Park Athletic Stadium, Nagoya
- Date: 28 September 2026
- Competitors: 12 from 7 nations

Medalists
gold medal	Winfred Yavi	Bahrain
silver medal	Nozomi Tanaka	Japan
bronze medal	Parul Chaudhary	India

The women's 5000 metres competition at the 2026 Asian Games took place on 28 September 2026 at the Mizuho Park Athletic Stadium in Nagoya, Japan. Winfred Yavi of Bahrain won the gold medal, Nozomi Tanaka of Japan won the silver and Parul Chaudhary of India won the bronze.

== Schedule ==
All times are Japan Standard Time (UTC+09:00)

Schedule
Date	Time	Event
Monday, 28 September 2026	17:13	Final

== Records ==
Prior to this competition, the existing world, Asian and Games records were as follows.

World Record	Beatrice Chebet (KEN)	13:58.06	Eugene, United States	6 May 2025
Asian Record	Jiang Bo (CHN)	14:28.09	Shanghai, China	22 October 1997
Games Record	Sun Yingjie (CHN)	14:40.41	Busan, South Korea	11 October 2002

== Results ==
Rank	Athlete	Time	Gap	Notes
1st place, gold medalist(s)	Winfred Yavi (BRN)	15:10.18	—	
2nd place, silver medalist(s)	Nozomi Tanaka (JPN)	15:11.65	+1.47	
3rd place, bronze medalist(s)	Parul Chaudhary (IND)	15:14.61	+4.43	
4	Yuma Yamamoto (JPN)	15:17.84	+7.66	
5	Norah Jeruto (KAZ)	15:18.21	+8.03	
6	Seema Kumari (IND)	15:35.06	+24.88	
7	Daisy Jepkemei (KAZ)	15:37.89	+27.71	SB
8	Mariia Korobitskaia (KGZ)	16:04.93	+54.75	SB
9	Ruth Jebet (BRN)	16:09.10	+58.92	
10	Kim Yu-jin (KOR)	16:09.60	+59.42	
11	Purna Neupane (NEP)	17:00.60	+1:50.42	
12	Santoshi Shrestha (NEP)	17:53.17	+2:42.99	
