= Athletics at the 2026 Asian Games – Women's 3000 metres steeplechase =

Women's 3000 metres steeplechase at the 2026 Asian Games
- Venue: Mizuho Park Athletic Stadium, Nagoya
- Date: 27 September 2026
- Competitors: 8 from 5 nations

Medalists
gold medal	Winfred Yavi	Bahrain
silver medal	Norah Jeruto	Kazakhstan
bronze medal	Parul Chaudhary	India

The women's 3000 metres steeplechase competition at the 2026 Asian Games took place on 27 September 2026 at the Mizuho Park Athletic Stadium in Nagoya, Japan. Winfred Yavi of Bahrain won the gold medal and set a new Asian Games record with a time of 9:04.36. Norah Jeruto of Kazakhstan and Parul Chaudhary of India won the silver and bronze medals respectively.

== Schedule ==
All times are Japan Standard Time (UTC+09:00)

Schedule
Date	Time	Event
Sunday, 27 September 2026	17:52	Final

== Records ==
Prior to this competition, the existing world, Asian and Games records were as follows.

World Record	Beatrice Chepkoech (KEN)	8:44.32	Monaco, Monaco	19 July 2018
Asian Record	Winfred Yavi (BHR)	8:44.39	Rome, Italy	29 August 2024
Games Record	Winfred Yavi (BHR)	9:04.36	Nagoya, Japan	27 September 2026

== Results ==
Rank	Athlete	Time	Gap	Notes
1st place, gold medalist(s)	Winfred Yavi (BRN)	9:04.36	—	GR
2nd place, silver medalist(s)	Norah Jeruto (KAZ)	9:06.82	+2.46	SB
3rd place, bronze medalist(s)	Parul Chaudhary (IND)	9:08.67	+4.31	PB
4	Ankita Dhyani (IND)	9:19.24	+14.88	PB
5	Miu Saito (JPN)	9:27.56	+23.20	SB
6	Tigest Mekonen (BRN)	9:51.94	+47.58	SB
7	Manami Nishiyama (JPN)	10:11.39	+1:07.03	
8	Jo Ha-rim (KOR)	10:26.06	+1:21.70	
