= 2023 World Athletics Championships – Women's 3000 metres steeplechase =

Women's 3000 metres steeplechase at the 2023 World Championships
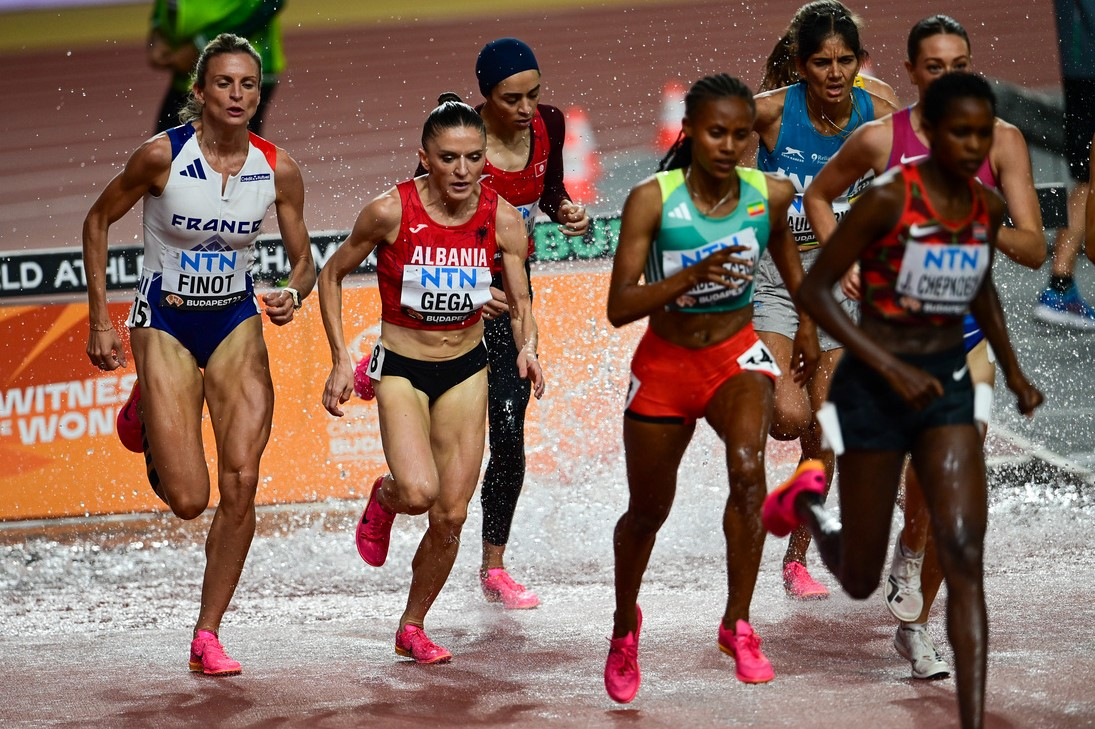
- The final underway.
- Venue: National Athletics Centre
- Dates: 23 August (heats); 27 August (final)
- Competitors: 35 from 22 nations
- Winning time: 8:54.29

Medalists
gold medal	Winfred Mutile Yavi	Bahrain
silver medal	Beatrice Chepkoech	Kenya
bronze medal	Faith Cherotich	Kenya

The women's 3000 metres steeplechase at the 2023 World Athletics Championships was held at the National Athletics Centre in Budapest on 23 and 27 August 2023.

== Summary ==
World record holder Beatrice Chepkoech showed her intention by assuming the lead 50 metres into the race. She proceeded to bang out 72 second laps confident she could burn off any competition. And it worked. Over the next six laps, one by one, they fell off the back, except one. Winfred Yavi refused to go away. Coming in to the bell, Yavi pulled next to Chepkoech. After the bell, Yavi pulled away, slowly, steadily. Yavi jumped the water jump barrier without touching it, she exited faster, looked back over her shoulder to make sure. It was clear would no challenge would be coming. By the time Yavi reached the finish line, Chepkoech was over 20 metres back. Faith Cherotich, the last to fall off the pace was the next to finish to collect bronze.

Yavi's time 8:54.29 was the fifth fastest of all time. Chepkoech had run two superior times, making Yavi the #4 performer of all time. Cherotich became #12. Fifth place Alice Finot became #19 and sixth place Maruša Mišmaš-Zrimšek became #20.

== Records ==
Before the competition records were as follows:

Record	Athlete & Nat.	Perf.	Location	Date
World record	Beatrice Chepkoech (KEN)	8:44.32	Fontvieille, Monaco	20 July 2018
Championship record	Norah Jeruto (KAZ)	8:53.02	Eugene, United States	20 July 2022
World Leading	Jackline Chepkoech (KEN)	8:57.35	London, United Kingdom	23 July 2023
African Record	Beatrice Chepkoech (KEN)	8:44.32	Fontvieille, Monaco	20 July 2018
Asian Record	Ruth Jebet (BHR)	8:52.78	Paris, France	27 August 2016
North, Central American and Caribbean record	Courtney Frerichs (USA)	8:57.77	Eugene, United States	21 August 2021
South American Record	Tatiane Raquel da Silva (BRA)	9:24.38	Watford, United Kingdom	11 June 2022
European Record	Gulnara Samitova-Galkina (RUS)	8:58.81	Beijing, China	17 August 2008
Oceanian record	Genevieve Lacaze (AUS)	9:14.28	Paris, France	27 August 2016

== Qualification standard ==
The standard to qualify automatically for entry was 9:23.00.

== Schedule ==
The event schedule, in local time (UTC+2), was as follows:

Date	Time	Round
23 August	19:53	Heats
27 August	21:05	Final

== Results ==
=== Heats ===
The first 5 athletes in each heat (Q) qualify to the final.

Rank	Heat	Name	Nationality	Time	Notes
1	3	Jackline Chepkoech	Kenya	9:16.41	Q
-	3	Zerfe Wondemagegn	Ethiopia	~~9:16.97~~	DSQ
2	3	Luiza Gega	Albania	9:17.71	Q
3	1	Winfred Mutile Yavi	Bahrain	9:19.18	Q
4	1	Beatrice Chepkoech	Kenya	9:19.22	Q
5	2	Faith Cherotich	Kenya	9:19.55	Q
6	2	Sembo Almayew	Ethiopia	9:19.60	Q
7	2	Peruth Chemutai	Uganda	9:20.03	Q
8	1	Lomi Muleta	Ethiopia	9:20.13	Q
9	3	Alice Finot	France	9:20.27	Q
10	1	Courtney Wayment	United States	9:20.60	Q
11	2	Maruša Mišmaš-Zrimšek	Slovenia	9:21.79	Q
12	1	Marwa Bouzayani	Tunisia	9:23.07	Q
13	1	Alicja Konieczek	Poland	9:23.45	PB
14	3	Olivia Gürth	Germany	9:24.28	Q, PB
15	2	Parul Chaudhary	India	9:24.29	Q, PB
16	1	Aimee Pratt	Great Britain & N.I.	9:26.37	
17	1	Regan Yee	Canada	9:26.39	
18	2	Ceili McCabe	Canada	9:29.30	
19	2	Cara Feain-Ryan	Australia	9:29.60	PB
20	3	Greta Karinauskaitė	Lithuania	9:30.28	
21	3	Kristlin Gear	United States	9:30.61	
22	3	Amy Cashin	Australia	9:31.07	PB
23	1	Marta Serrano	Spain	9:31.82	
24	3	Irene Sánchez-Escribano	Spain	9:31.97	
25	2	Carolina Robles	Spain	9:34.41	
26	2	Flavie Renouard	France	9:39.91	
27	2	Emma Coburn	United States	9:41.52	
28	2	Aneta Konieczek	Poland	9:45.61	
29	2	Daisy Jepkemei	Kazakhstan	9:46.23	
30	1	Tuğba Güvenç	Turkey	9:50.96	
31	1	Brielle Erbacher	Australia	9:57.11	
32	1	Nataliya Strebkova	Ukraine	10:02.20	
33	3	Juliane Hvid	Denmark	10:09.41	
34	3	Tatiane Raquel da Silva	Brazil	10:19.80	

=== Final ===
The final was started on 27 August at 21:05.

Rank	Name	Nationality	Time	Notes
1st place, gold medalist(s)	Winfred Mutile Yavi	Bahrain	8:54.29	WL
2nd place, silver medalist(s)	Beatrice Chepkoech	Kenya	8:58.98	SB
3rd place, bronze medalist(s)	Faith Cherotich	Kenya	9:00.69	PB
4	Alice Finot	France	9:06.15	NR
5	Maruša Mišmaš-Zrimšek	Slovenia	9:06.37	NR
6	Peruth Chemutai	Uganda	9:10.26	PB
7	Luiza Gega	Albania	9:10.27	SB
8	Jackline Chepkoech	Kenya	9:14.72	
9	Marwa Bouzayani	Tunisia	9:15.07	
10	Parul Chaudhary	India	9:15.31	NR
11	Lomi Muleta	Ethiopia	9:15.36	
12	Sembo Almayew	Ethiopia	9:18.25	
13	Olivia Gürth	Germany	9:20.08	PB
14	Courtney Wayment	United States	9:25.90	
	Zerfe Wondemagegn	Ethiopia	~~9:05.51~~	DSQ
