= Kenya at the 2023 World Athletics Championships =

- Flag of Kenya
- WA code: KEN

in Budapest, Hungary 19 August 2023 – 27 August 2023
- Competitors: 52 (28 men and 24 women)
- Medals Ranked 5th: Gold 3 Silver 3 Bronze 4 Total 10

World Athletics Championships appearances (overview)
- 1983; 1987; 1991; 1993; 1995; 1997; 1999; 2001; 2003; 2005; 2007; 2009; 2011; 2013; 2015; 2017; 2019; 2022; 2023

Kenya competed at the 2023 World Athletics Championships in Budapest, Hungary, from 19 to 27 August 2023.

== Medalists ==
Medal	Athlete	Event	Date
Gold	Faith Kipyegon	Women's 1500 metres	August 22
Gold	Faith Kipyegon	Women's 5000 metres	August 26
Gold	Mary Moraa	Women's 800 metres	August 27
Silver	Daniel Ebenyo	Men's 10,000 metres	August 20
Silver	Emmanuel Wanyonyi	Men's 800 metres	August 26
Silver	Beatrice Chepkoech	Women's 3000 metres steeplechase	August 27
Bronze	Abraham Kibiwot	Men's 3000 metres steeplechase	August 22
Bronze	Beatrice Chebet	Women's 5000 metres	August 26
Bronze	Jacob Krop	Men's 5000 metres	August 27
Bronze	Faith Cherotich	Women's 3000 metres steeplechase	August 27

== Results ==
Kenya entered 52 athletes (with reserves).

Key

- Q = Qualified for the next round
- q = Qualified for the next round as a fastest loser or, in field events, by position without achieving the qualifying target
- NR = National record
- PB = Personal best
- SB = Season best
- NM = No mark
- N/A = Round not applicable for the event

=== Men ===
Track and road event

Athlete	Event	Heat		Semifinal		Final	
Athlete	Event	Result	Rank	Result	Rank	Result	Rank
Ferdinand Omanyala	100 metres	9.97	2 Q	10.01	3 q	10.07	7
Boniface Mweresa	400 metres	45.91	7	Did not advance			
Ngeno Kipngetich	800 metres	1:47.63	1 Q	1:45.56	8	Did not advance	
Emmanuel Korir	800 metres	1:46.78 SB	4	Did not advance			
Ferguson Rotich	800 metres	1:46.53	6	Did not advance			
Emmanuel Wanyonyi	800 metres	1:44.92	1 Q	1:43.83	1 Q	1:44.53	2nd place, silver medalist(s)
Reynold Kipkorir Cheruiyot	1500 metres	3:34.24	3 Q	3:35.53	6 Q	3:30.78	8
Timothy Cheruiyot	1500 metres	3:47.09	6 Q	3:37.40	9	Did not advance	
Abel Kipsang	1500 metres	3:34.08	1 Q	3:32.72	2 Q	3:29.89	4
Cornelius Kemboi	5000 metres	13:44.32	17	—		Did not advance	
Nicholas Kimeli	5000 metres	13:40.43	14	—		Did not advance	
Ishmael Rokitto Kipkurui	5000 metres	13:33.63	7 Q	—		13:21.20	10
Jacob Krop	5000 metres	13:33.63	7 Q	—		13:12.28	3rd place, bronze medalist(s)
Daniel Ebenyo	10,000 metres	—				27:52.60	2nd place, silver medalist(s)
Benard Kibet	10,000 metres	—				27:56.27	5
Nicholas Kimeli	10,000 metres	—				28:03.38	8
Joshua Belet	Marathon	—				DNF	
Timothy Kiplagat	Marathon	—				2:11:25	14
Titus Kipruto	Marathon	—				2:10:47	8
Wiseman Mukhobe	400 metres hurdles	49.10	4 Q	49.40	6	Did not advance	
Leonard Bett	3000 metres steeplechase	8:16.74	3 Q	—		8:12.26	4
Abraham Kibiwot	3000 metres steeplechase	8:24.31	4 Q	—		8:11.98	3rd place, bronze medalist(s)
Simon Koech	3000 metres steeplechase	8:20.29	3 Q	—		8:14.37	7
Samuel Gathimba	20 kilometres walk	—				1:18:34 SB	9
Zablon Ekhal Ekwam; Wyclife Kinyamal; Kennedy Kimeu Muthoki; Kelvin Sane Tauta	4 × 400 metres relay	3:01.41 SB	7	—		Did not advance	

Field events

Athlete	Event	Qualification		Final	
Athlete	Event	Distance	Position	Distance	Position
Julius Yego	Javelin throw	78.42	17	Did not advance	

=== Women ===
Track and road events

Athlete	Event	Heat		Semifinal		Final	
Athlete	Event	Result	Rank	Result	Rank	Result	Rank
Vivian Chebet Kiprotich	800 metres	2:01.26	4	Did not advance			
Naomi Korir	800 metres	2:01.41	7	Did not advance			
Mary Moraa	800 metres	1:59.89	1 Q	1:58.48	1 Q	1:56.03 PB	1st place, gold medalist(s)
Nelly Chepchirchir	1500 metres	4:00.87	1 Q	4:02.14	1 Q	3:57.90 PB	5
Purity Chepkirui	1500 metres	4:04.51 PB	7	Did not advance			
Edinah Jebitok	1500 metres	4:04.09	4 Q	4:05.41	10	Did not advance	
Faith Kipyegon	1500 metres	4:02.62	1 Q	3:55.14	1 Q	3:54.87	1st place, gold medalist(s)
Beatrice Chebet	5000 metres	14:57.70	1 Q	—		14:54.33	3rd place, bronze medalist(s)
Margaret Kipkemboi	5000 metres	15:00.10	3 Q	—		14:56.62	4
Faith Kipyegon	5000 metres	14:32.31	2 Q	—		14:53.88	1st place, gold medalist(s)
Lilian Kasait Rengeruk	5000 metres	14:36.61	5 Q	—		14:59.32	10
Irine Jepchumba Kimais	10,000 metres	—				31:32.19 SB	4
Grace Nawowuna	10,000 metres	—				31:38.17	9
Agnes Jebet Ngetich	10,000 metres	—				31:34.83 PB	6
Sally Chepyego Kaptich	Marathon	—				2:27:09	7
Shyline Jepkorir Toroitich	Marathon	—				DNF	
Rosemary Wanjiru	Marathon	—				2:26:42	6
Beatrice Chepkoech	3000 metres steeplechase	9:19.22	2 Q	—		8:58.98 SB	2nd place, silver medalist(s)
Jackline Chepkoech	3000 metres steeplechase	9:16.41	1 Q	—		9:14.72	9
Faith Cherotich	3000 metres steeplechase	9:19.55	1 Q	—		9:00.69 PB	3rd place, bronze medalist(s)
Emily Wamusyi Ngii	20 kilometres walk	—				DNF	

=== Mixed ===
Track events

Athlete	Event	Heat		Final	
Athlete	Event	Result	Rank	Result	Rank
Zablon Ekhal Ekwam; Wyclife Kinyamal; Millicent Ndoro; Mercy Adongo Oketch	4 × 400 metres relay	3:15.47	15	Did not advance	
