= Athletics at the 2018 Asian Games – Women's 3000 metres steeplechase =

Women's 3000 metres steeplechase at the 2018 Asian Games
- Venue: Gelora Bung Karno Stadium
- Date: 27 August 2018
- Competitors: 14 from 10 nations

Medalists
gold medal	Winfred Yavi	Bahrain
silver medal	Sudha Singh	India
bronze medal	Nguyễn Thị Oanh	Vietnam

The women's 3000 metres steeplechase competition at the 2018 Asian Games took place on 27 August 2018 at the Gelora Bung Karno Stadium.

== Schedule ==
All times are Western Indonesia Time (UTC+07:00)

Date	Time	Event
Monday, 27 August 2018	19:15	Final

== Records ==
Prior to this competition, the existing world, Asian and Games records were as follows.

World Record	Beatrice Chepkoech (KEN)	8:44.32	Monaco	20 July 2018
Asian Record	Ruth Jebet (BRN)	8:52.78	Paris, France	27 August 2016
Games Record	Ruth Jebet (BRN)	9:31.36	Incheon, South Korea	27 September 2014

== Results ==
Legend

- DNS — Did not start

Rank	Athlete	Time	Notes
1st place, gold medalist(s)	Winfred Yavi (BRN)	9:36.52	
2nd place, silver medalist(s)	Sudha Singh (IND)	9:40.03	
3rd place, bronze medalist(s)	Nguyễn Thị Oanh (VIE)	9:43.83	
4	Zhang Xinyan (CHN)	9:46.30	
5	Xu Shuangshuang (CHN)	9:47.42	
6	Nilani Ratnayake (SRI)	9:54.65	
7	Ro Hyo-gyong (PRK)	10:05.47	
8	Yukari Ishizawa (JPN)	10:13.53	
9	Jo Ha-rim (KOR)	10:17.31	
10	Kim Ran-yon (PRK)	10:20.07	
11	Chinta Yadav (IND)	10:26.21	
12	Pretty Sihite (INA)	11:06.97	
13	Rubia Martins (TLS)	11:15.27	
—	Tigest Getent (BRN)	DNS	
