= Athletics at the 2022 Asian Games – Women's 3000 metres steeplechase =

Women's 3000 metres steeplechase at the 2022 Asian Games
- Venue: Hangzhou Olympic Expo Main Stadium
- Date: 2 October 2023
- Competitors: 7 from 5 nations

Medalists
gold medal	Winfred Yavi	Bahrain
silver medal	Parul Chaudhary	India
bronze medal	Priti Lamba	India

The women's 3000 metres steeplechase competition at the 2022 Asian Games took place on 2 October 2023 at the HOC Stadium, Hangzhou.

== Schedule ==
All times are China Standard Time (UTC+08:00)

Date	Time	Event
Monday, 2 October 2023	19:20	Final

== Records ==
Prior to this competition, the existing world, Asian and Games records were as follows.

World Record	Beatrice Chepkoech (KEN)	8:44.32	Monaco	20 July 2018
Asian Record	Winfred Yavi (BRN)	8:50.66	Eugene, United States	16 September 2023
Games Record	Ruth Jebet (BRN)	9:31.36	Incheon, South Korea	27 September 2014

== Results ==
Rank	Athlete	Time	Notes
1st place, gold medalist(s)	Winfred Yavi (BRN)	9:18.28	GR
2nd place, silver medalist(s)	Parul Chaudhary (IND)	9:27.63	
3rd place, bronze medalist(s)	Priti Lamba (IND)	9:43.32	
4	Tigest Getent (BRN)	9:43.71	
5	Daisy Jepkemei (KAZ)	9:47.53	
6	Nguyễn Thị Oanh (VIE)	9:57.13	
7	Zhang Xinyan (CHN)	9:57.99	
