= Yabuta =

Yabuta (written: 藪田 or 薮田) is a Japanese surname. Notable people with the surname include:

- Mitsunori Yabuta (藪田 光教, born 1976), Japanese footballer
- Yasuhiko Yabuta (薮田 安彦, born 1974), Japanese baseball player
- Yui Yabuta (藪田 裕衣, born 1996), Japanese long-distance runner
