= 2025 Asian Athletics Championships – Women's 5000 metres =

Women's 5000 metres at the 2025 Asian Athletics Championships
- Venue: Gumi Civic Stadium
- Location: Gumi, South Korea
- Dates: 31 May
- Competitors: 14 from 10 nations
- Winning time: 14:58.71 CR

Medalists
gold medal	Norah Jeruto	Kazakhstan
silver medal	Parul Chaudhary	India
bronze medal	Yuma Yamamoto	Japan

The women's 5000 metres event at the 2025 Asian Athletics Championships was held on 31 May.

== Records ==
Records before the 2025 Asian Athletics Championships
Record	Athlete (nation)	Time (s)	Location	Date
World record	Gudaf Tsegay (ETH)	14:00.21	Eugene, United States	17 September 2023
Asian record	Bo Jiang (CHN)	14:28.09	Shanghai, China	23 October 1997
Championship record	Betlhem Desalegn (UAE)	15:12.84	Pune, India	7 July 2013
World leading	Agnes Jebet Ngetich (KEN)	14:25.80	Miramar, United States	2 May 2025
Asian leading	Nozomi Tanaka (JPN)	14:51.26	Boston, United States	15 February 2025

== Schedule ==
The event schedule, in local time (UTC+9), was as follows:

Date	Time	Round
31 May	18:10	Final

== Results ==
Place	Athlete	Nation	Time	Notes
1st place, gold medalist(s)	Norah Jeruto	Kazakhstan	14:58.71	CR
2nd place, silver medalist(s)	Parul Chaudhary	India	15:15.33	
3rd place, bronze medalist(s)	Yuma Yamamoto	Japan	15:16.86	
4	He Wuga	China	15:23.96	SB
5	Sanjivani Jadhav	India	15:36.40	SB
6	Nguyễn Thị Oanh	Vietnam	15:46.11	NR
7	Sora Shinozakura	Japan	15:54.15	
8	Layla Al-Masri	Palestine	15:57.15	
9	Kim Yu-jin	South Korea	16:06.41	SB
10	Choi Jung-yoon	South Korea	16:25.32	PB
11	W.A.M.Rasara Wijesuriya	Sri Lanka	16:29.15	
12	Lim Kyung-hee	South Korea	16:45.20	SB
13	Hebah Hammoud Ameen	Jordan	18:14.38	
—	Ainuska Kalil Kysy	Kyrgyzstan	DNF	
