= 2023 Asian Athletics Championships – Women's 5000 metres =

Women's 5000 metres at the 2023 Asian Athletics Championships
- Venue: National Stadium
- Location: Bangkok, Thailand
- Dates: 16 July
- Competitors: 12 from 10 nations
- Winning time: 15:51.16

Medalists
gold medal	Yuma Yamamoto	Japan
silver medal	Parul Chaudhary	India
bronze medal	Ankita Dhyani	India

The women's 5000 metres event at the 2023 Asian Athletics Championships was held on 16 July.

== Records ==
Records before the 2023 Asian Athletics Championships
Record	Athlete (nation)	Time (s)	Location	Date
World record	Faith Kipyegon (KEN)	14:05.20	Paris, France	9 June 2023
Asian record	Bo Jiang (CHN)	14:28.09	Shanghai, China	23 October 1997
Championship record	Betlhem Desalegn (UAE)	15:12.84	Pune, India	7 July 2013
World leading	Faith Kipyegon (KEN)	14:05.20	Paris, France	9 June 2023
Asian leading	Nozomi Tanaka (JPN)	4:06.07	Oulu, Finland	8 July 2023

== Results ==
Rank	Name	Nationality	Time	Notes
1st place, gold medalist(s)	Yuma Yamamoto	Japan	15:51.16	
2nd place, silver medalist(s)	Parul Chaudhary	India	15:52.35	
3rd place, bronze medalist(s)	Ankita Dhiyani	India	16:03.33	
4	Caroline Kipkirui	Kazakhstan	16:10.20	
5	Bayartsogtyn Mönkhzayaa	Mongolia	16:12.73	
6	Ma Xiuzhen	China	16:35.72	
7	Phạm Thị Hồng Lệ	Vietnam	17:00.10	
8	Layla Almasri	Palestine	17:07.18	
9	Rajpara Pachhai	Nepal	17:58.54	
10	Linda Janthachit	Thailand	18:12.43	PB
11	Vut Tsz Ying	Hong Kong	18:13.90	PB
12	Pareeya Sonsem	Thailand	18:25.15	PB
