= Priti Lamba =

Indian athlete

Personal information
- Nationality: Indian
- Born: 18 December 1995 (age 30)

Sport
- Sport: Athletics
Medal record
Women's athletics
Representing India
Asian Games
Bronze medal – third place	2022 Hangzhou	3000 m steeplechase
South Asian Games
Bronze medal – third place	2022 Kathmandu	5000 m

Priti Lamba (born 18 December 1995) is an Indian track athlete. She won a bronze medal at the women's 3000 metres steeplechase event at the 2022 Asian Games.
