= Athletics at the 2023 African Games – Women's 3000 metres steeplechase =

The women's 3000 metres steeplechase event at the 2023 African Games was held on 20 March 2024 in Accra, Ghana.

== Results ==
Rank	Name	Nationality	Time	Notes
1st place, gold medalist(s)	Beatrice Chepkoech	Kenya	9:15.61	WL
2nd place, silver medalist(s)	Peruth Chemutai	Uganda	9:16.07	
3rd place, bronze medalist(s)	Lomi Muleta	Ethiopia	9:26.63	
4	Sembo Almayew	Ethiopia	9:30.19	
5	Frehiwot Gesese	Ethiopia	9:35.32	
6	Purity Kirui	Kenya	9:51.01	
7	Caren Chebet	Kenya	10:03.31	
8	Ronke Akanbi	Nigeria	10:55.59	
9	Rihab Dhahri	Tunisia	11:17.93	
