= Frehiwot Gesese =

Ethiopian steeplechaser (born 2006)

Personal information
- Full name: Firehiwot Gesese Ayana
- Nationality: Ethiopia
- Born: 1 January 2006 (20 years, 213 days old)

Sport
- Sport: Sport of athletics
- Events: 3000 metres steeplechase 2000 metres steeplechase

Achievements and titles
- National finals: 2022 Ethiopian Champs; • 3000m s'chase, 9th; 2023 Ethiopian Champs; • 3000m s'chase, 3rd (bronze)
- Personal bests: 2000mSC: 6:18.55 (2023) 3000mSC: 9:35.32 (2024)
Medal record
Women's athletics
Representing Ethiopia
African U18 Championships
Silver medal – second place	2023 Ndola	2000 m s'chase
- Updated on 4 April 2024

Frehiwot Gesese Ayana (born 1 January 2006) is an Ethiopian steeplechase runner. She won a silver medal in the 2000 metres steeplechase at the 2023 African U18 Championships, and she was 5th at the African Games in 2024.

== Career ==
Frehiwot has competed in athletics since 2021, finishing 6th at the Ethiopian Athletics Federation competition in Addis Ababa. In her first Ethiopian Athletics Championships, she finished 9th in the 3000 m steeplechase in 2022.

In May 2023 at her second national championship, she improved her placing to 3rd, winning her first senior national medal. Later that year she was selected for the Ethiopian team at the African U18 Championships, where she won the silver medal in the 2000 metres steeplechase. She only lost to Walle Fenta, who ran an Ethiopian U20 record of 6:14.29. In November 2023, Frehiwot was announced to compete in the Cross La Mandria International cross country running race along with Walle.

Frehiwot first represented Ethiopia on a senior team at the 2023 African Games, actually held in 2024 due to the COVID-19 pandemic. She finished 5th in the 3000 m steeplechase.

== Statistics ==
=== Personal best progression ===
3000m Steeplechase progression
#	Mark	Pl.	Competition	Venue	Date	Ref.
1	10:36.1hA	6th	EAF Competition	Addis Ababa, Ethiopia	21 Dec 2021	
2	9:56.2hA	9th	Ethiopian Athletics Championships	Hawassa, Ethiopia	30 Mar 2022	
3	9:35.32	5th	African Games	Accra, Ghana	19 Mar 2024	
