= Zhang Xinyan =

Chinese steeplechase runner

Personal information
- Born: 9 February 1994 (age 32) Dingxi, Gansu, China
- Height: 1.7 m (5 ft 7 in)
- Weight: 55 kg (121 lb)

Sport
- Country: China
- Sport: Track and field
- Event: 3000 metres steeplechase
- Updated on 29 August 2015

Zhang Xinyan (simplified Chinese: 张新艳; traditional Chinese: 張新艷; pinyin: Zhāng Xīnyàn; born 9 February 1994) is a Chinese runner competing in the 3000 metres steeplechase.

She represented her country at the 2015 World Championships in Beijing without qualifying for the final. She participated in the 2016 Summer Olympics.

== Competition record ==
Year	Competition	Venue	Position	Event	Notes
Representing China
2015	Asian Championships	Wuhan, China	3rd	3000 m s'chase	9:46.82
2015	World Championships	Beijing, China	40th (h)	3000 m s'chase	10:13.25
2016	Olympic Games	Rio de Janeiro, Brazil	19th (h)	3000 m s'chase	9:31.47
2018	Asian Games	Jakarta, Indonesia	4th	3000 m s'chase	9:46.30
2019	Asian Championships	Doha, Qatar	12th	3000 m s'chase	10:44.36
2019	World Championships	Doha, Qatar	25th (h)	3000 m s'chase	9:43.75
2023	Asian Games	Hangzhou, China	7th	3000 m s'chase	9:57.99

== Personal bests ==
Outdoor

- 5000 metres – 15:51.37 (Shenyang 2013)
- 10,000 metres – 34:14.17 (Zhaoqing 2013)
- 3000 metres steeplechase – 9:28.54 (Luoyang 2016)
