= Yuma Yamamoto =

Japanese middle-distance and long-distance runner

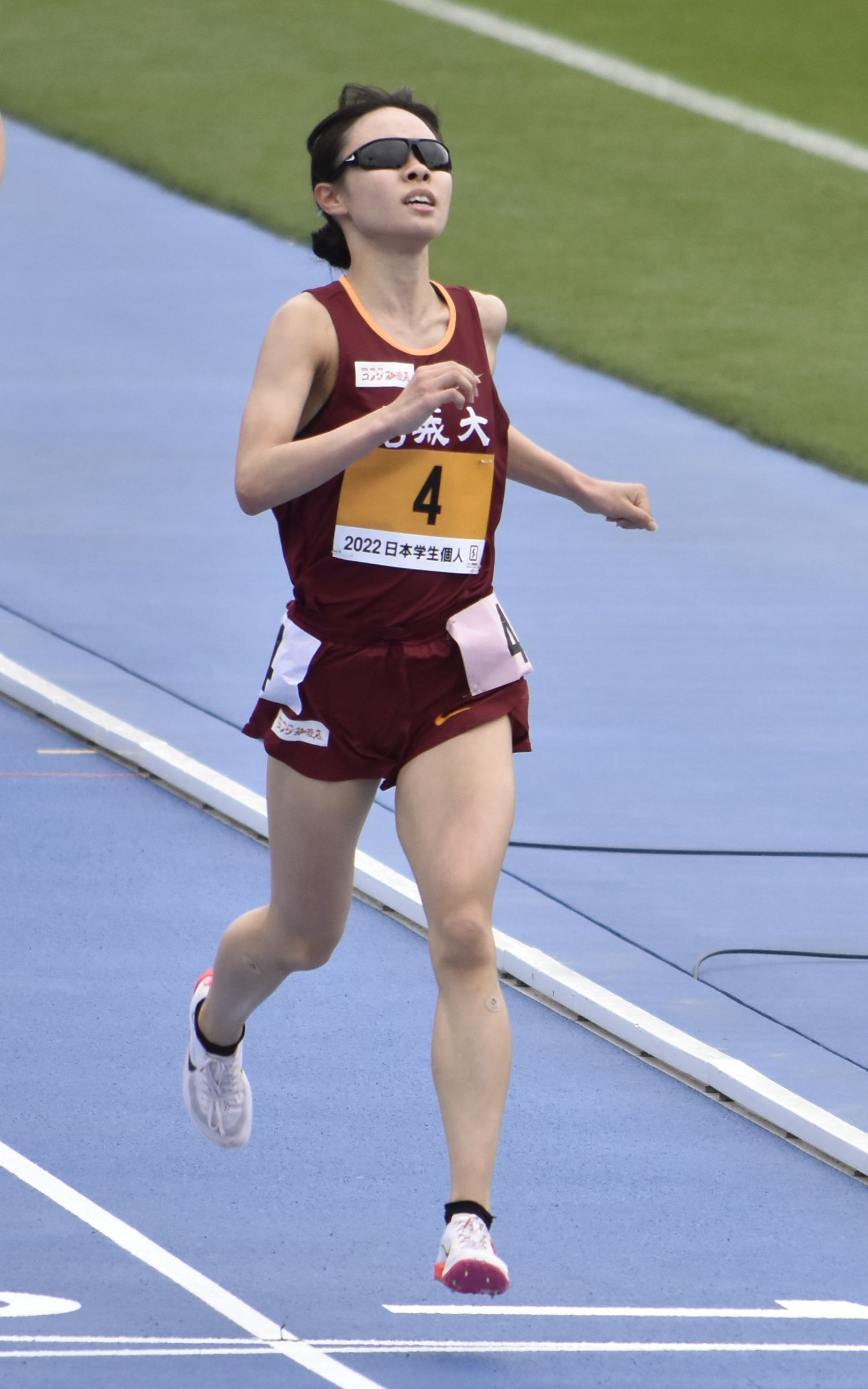
- in 2022

Personal information
- Born: 1 May 2000 (age 26) Aichi Prefecture, Japan
- Education: Meijo University

Sport
- Sport: Athletics
- Events: Middle-distance running Long-distance running
Medal record
Women's Athletics
Representing Japan
Asian Championships
Gold medal – first place	2023 Bangkok	5000 m
Bronze medal – third place	2025 Gumi	5000 m
Asian Indoor Athletics Championships
Gold medal – first place	2024 Tehran	3000 m
Bronze medal – third place	2023 Astana	3000 m

Yuma Yamamoto (山本 有真, Yamamoto Yuma; born 1 May 2000) is a Japanese athlete specialising in the Middle-distance and Long-distance running. She represented her country at the 2023 Asian Athletics Championships, the 2023 World Athletics Championships, 2024 Summer Olympics and the 2025 World Athletics Championships.

== International competitions ==
Year	Competition	Venue	Position	Event	Notes
Representing Japan
2023	Asian Indoor Athletics Championships	Astana, Kazakhstan	3rd	3000 m	9:09.29
2023	World Championships	Budapest, Hungary	38th (h)	5000 m	16:05.57
2023	Asian Games	Hangzhou, China	4th	5000 m	15:30.08
2023	Asian Athletics Championships	Bangkok, Thailand	1st	5000 m	15:51.16
2024	Asian Indoor Athletics Championships	Tehran, Iran	1st	3000 m	9:16.71
2024	Olympic Games	Paris, France	17th (h)	5000 m	15:43.67
2025	Asian Championships	Gumi, South Korea	3rd	5000 m	15:16.86
2025	World Championships	Tokyo, Japan	37th (h)	5000 m	15:36.29
