= Winfred Yavi =

Kenyan-born Bahraini athletics competitor (born 1999)

Winfred Yavi OLY
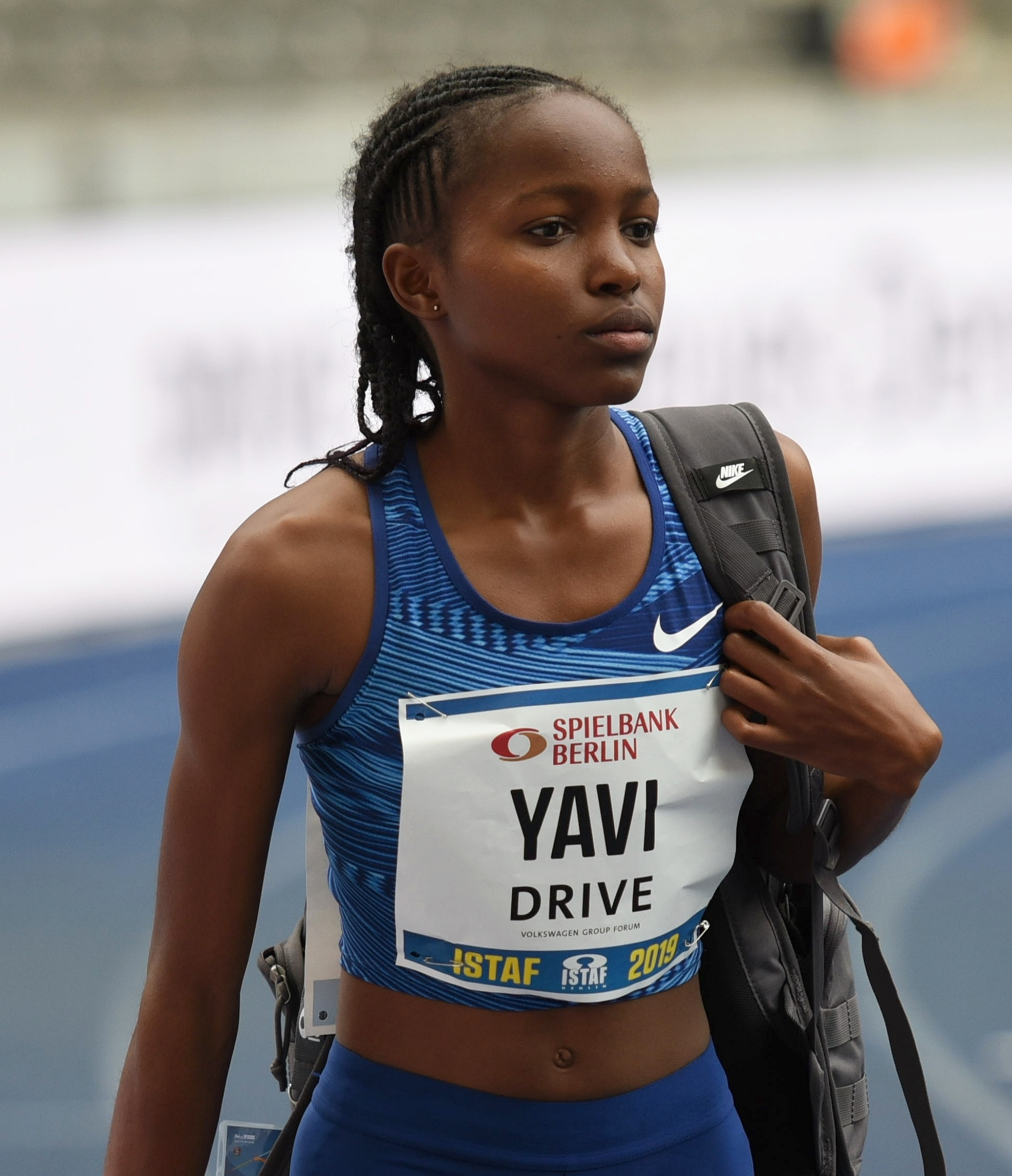
- Yavi at the ISTAF Berlin in 2019

Personal information
- Full name: Winfred Mutile Yavi
- Born: December 31, 1999 (age 26) Nairobi, Kenya
- Height: 1.59 m (5 ft 3 in)
- Weight: 49 kg (108 lb)

Sport
- Country: Bahrain
- Sport: Athletics
- Event: 3000 metres steeplechase

Achievements and titles
- Personal bests: 3000 m: 8:39.64i (Val-de-Reuil 2020); 3000 m steeplechase: 8:44.39 (Rome 2024) AR; 5000 m: 14:30.06 (Rome 2026) NR
Medal record
Women's athletics
Representing Bahrain
Olympic Games
Gold medal – first place	2024 Paris	3000 m st.
World Championships
Gold medal – first place	2023 Budapest	3000 m st.
Silver medal – second place	2025 Tokyo	3000 m st.
Diamond League
First place	2023	3000 m st.
Asian Games
Gold medal – first place	2018 Jakarta	3000 m st.
Gold medal – first place	2022 Hangzhou	1500 m
Gold medal – first place	2022 Hangzhou	3000 m st.
Gold medal – first place	2026 Aichi–Nagoya	5000 m
Gold medal – first place	2026 Aichi–Nagoya	10,000 m
Gold medal – first place	2026 Aichi–Nagoya	3000 m st.
Asian Championships
Gold medal – first place	2019 Doha	5000 m
Gold medal – first place	2019 Doha	3000 m st.
Bronze medal – third place	2019 Doha	1500 m
Military World Games
Gold medal – first place	2019 Wuhan	3000 m st.
Silver medal – second place	2019 Wuhan	5000 m
Islamic Solidarity Games
Gold medal – first place	2021 Konya	1500 m
Gold medal – first place	2021 Konya	3000 m st.
Gold medal – first place	2025 Riyadh	3000 m st.
Arab Championships
Gold medal – first place	2019 Cairo	3000 m st.
Gold medal – first place	2019 Cairo	5000 m
World U20 Championships
Bronze medal – third place	2018 Tampere	3000 m st.
Representing Asia-Pacific
Continental Cup
Bronze medal – third place	2018 Ostrava	3000 m st.

Winfred Mutile Yavi OLY (Arabic: وينفريد يافي, born 31 December 1999) is a Kenyan-born Bahraini female athlete who specialises in the 3000 metres steeplechase. Currently the second fastest athlete in history at the distance with a personal best of 8:44.39, she won the gold medal at the 2024 Summer Olympics, setting a new Olympic record. She won the gold medal at the 2023 World Athletics Championships.

== Career ==
Yavi hails from Ukia, Makueni County. Born in Kenya, Winfred Yavi transferred her allegiance to Bahrain at the age of fifteen, becoming eligible to compete for her adopted nation in August 2016. She competed in the 3000 m steeplechase at the 2017 World Championships at the age of 17, and finished eighth in a personal best time of 9:22.67. Yavi was the bronze medallist in her specialist event at the 2018 World Under-20 Championships. She also improved her personal best significantly in 2018, running 9:10.74 at the Monaco Diamond League.

In 2019, Yavi won gold in both the 5000 m and 3000 m steeplechase, as well as a bronze in the 1500 m at the 2019 Asian Athletics Championships. She set a new personal best of 9:07.23 in finishing third at the Müller Grand Prix. She finished fourth in the 3000 m steeplechase at the 2019 World Championships held in Doha. She won a gold medal in the 3000 m steeplechase and a silver medal in the 5000 m at the World Military Games.

Yavi ran a new personal best of 9:02.64 in finishing third at the 2021 Doha Diamond League. She finished tenth in the final at the delayed 2020 Tokyo Olympics.

In 2022, Yavi ran her first sub-9 minute 3000 m steeplechase at the Prefontaine Classic, running a time of 8:58.71. She followed this up by winning the Paris Diamond League with a time of 8:56.55. She finished fourth in the final at the 2022 World Championships in Eugene.

The following year, Yavi won gold in her specialty event at the 2023 World Championships with a personal best time of 8:54.29. She went onto win at the Zurich Diamond League, and the Prefontaine Classic where she improved her personal best to 8:50.66, the second fastest time in history at the time. Yavi ended her season by winning gold in both the 1500 m and 3000 m steeplechase at the Asian Games.

In June 2024, Yavi set a new 5000 m personal best of 14:41.99 in Liège. She won gold in the 3000 m steeplechase at the 2024 Paris Olympics in an Olympic record time of 8:52.76. She won at the Rome Diamond League in a time of 8:44.39, breaking her own national record by over 6 seconds and only missing out on the world record by 0.07 seconds. Yavi went on to place second at the Diamond League final in Brussels, finishing behind Faith Cherotich.

== Statistics ==
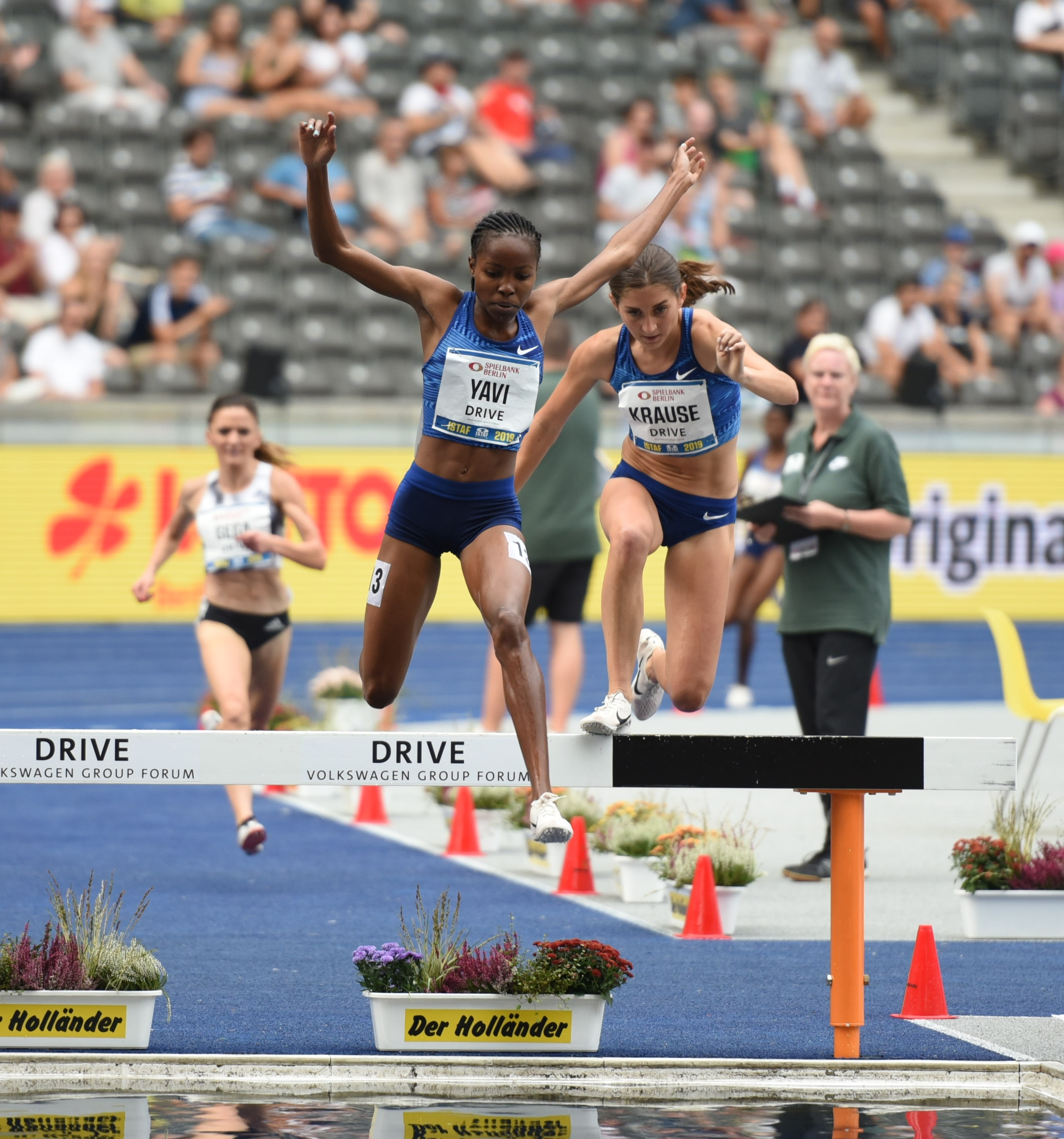
Yavi races her specialist event at the 2019 ISTAF Berlin meeting.

All information from World Athletics profile.

=== Personal bests ===
- 1500 metres – 4:05.54 (Nairobi 2022)
- 3000 metres – 9:10.5h (Embu 2016)
  - 3000 metres indoor – 8:39.64 (Val-de-Reuil 2020) Asian record
- 2000 metres steeplechase – 5:56.83 (Berlin 2019) AB
  - 2000 metres steeplechase indoor – 5:45.09 (Liévin 2021) AB
- 3000 metres steeplechase – 8:44.39 AR (Rome 2024)
- 10,000 metres – 32:39.18 (Nagoya 2026)

=== International competitions ===
Representing Bahrain
Year	Competition	Venue	Position	Event	Time	Notes
2017	World Championships	London, United Kingdom	8th	3000 m s'chase	9:22.67	PB
2018	World U20 Championships	Tampere, Finland	3rd	3000 m s'chase	9:23.47	
2018	Asian Games	Jakarta, Indonesia	1st	3000 m s'chase	9:36.52	
2018	Continental Cup	Ostrava, Czech Republic	3rd	3000 m s'chase	9:17.86	(Note: Representing Asia-Pacific.)
2019	Arab Championships	Cairo, Egypt	1st	5000 m	17:15.08	
2019	Arab Championships	Cairo, Egypt	1st	3000 m s'chase	10:07.62	
2019	Asian Championships	Doha, Qatar	3rd	1500 m	4:16.18	SB
2019	Asian Championships	Doha, Qatar	1st	5000 m	15:28.87	PB
2019	Asian Championships	Doha, Qatar	1st	3000 m s'chase	9:46.18	SB
2019	World Championships	Doha, Qatar	4th	3000 m s'chase	9:05.68	PB
2019	Military World Games	Wuhan, China	2nd	5000 m	15:15.93	
2019	Military World Games	Wuhan, China	1st	3000 m s'chase	9:19.24	
2021	Olympic Games	Tokyo, Japan	10th	3000 m s'chase	9:19.74	(Note: In the heats Yavi ran 9:10.80.)
2022	World Championships	Eugene, OR, United States	4th	3000 m s'chase	9:01.31	
2022	Islamic Solidarity Games	Konya, Turkey	1st	3000 m s'chase	9:34:57	
2023	Arab Games	Oran, Algeria	1st	3000 m s'chase	9:04.58	
2023	World Championships	Budapest, Hungary	1st	3000 m s'chase	8:54.29	
2023	Asian Games	Hangzhou, China	1st	1500 m	4:11.65	
2023	Asian Games	Hangzhou, China	1st	3000 m s'chase	9:18.28	
2024	Olympic Games	Paris, France	1st	3000 m s'chase	8:52.76	OR PB
2025	World Championships	Tokyo, Japan	2nd	3000 m s'chase	8:56.46	
2025	Islamic Solidarity Games	Riyadh, Saudi Arabia	1st	3000 m s'chase	9:40.65	
2026	Asian Games	Nagoya, Japan	1st	5000 m	15:10.18	
2026	Asian Games	Nagoya, Japan	1st	10,000 m	32:39.18	
2026	Asian Games	Nagoya, Japan	1st	3000 m s'chase	9:04.36	

=== Circuit wins ===
- Diamond League 3000 m steeplechase champion: 2023

3000 m steeplechase wins, other events specified in parentheses

- 2022 (1): Paris (WL PB)
- 2023 (3): Doha (WL), Zürich, Eugene (AR, WL, MR, PB)
- 2024 (2): Paris, Rome (AR, WL, MR, PB)
- 2025 (1): Eugene (WL, MR)
- 2026 (1): Lausanne (MR)
