= Yui Yabuta =

Japanese long-distance runner

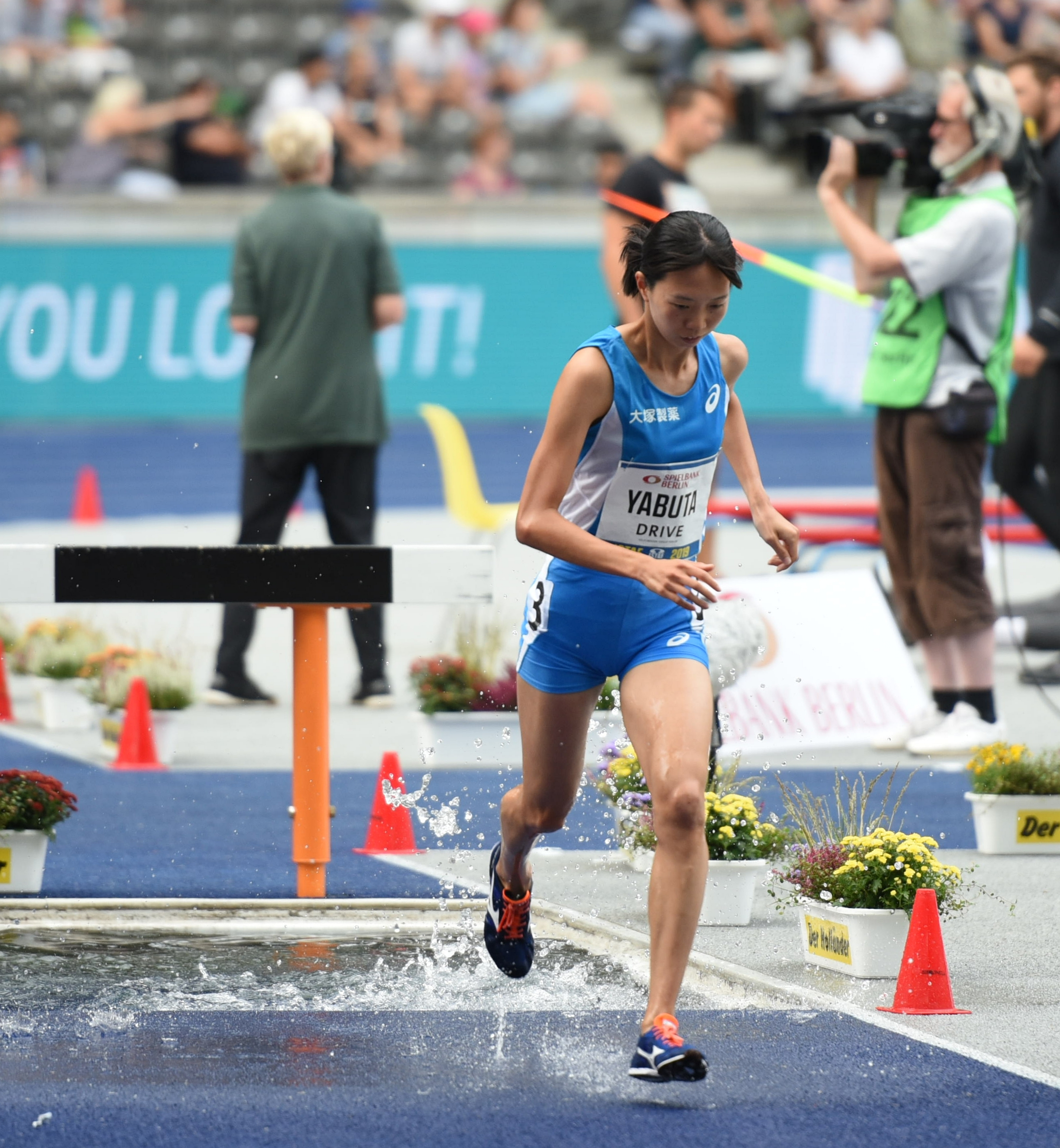
- Yui Yabuta in 2019

Personal information
- Born: 4 March 1996 (age 29)

Sport
- Country: Japan
- Sport: Long-distance running

Yui Yabuta (藪田 裕衣, Yabuta Yui; born 4 March 1996) is a Japanese long-distance runner. She competed in the senior women's race at the 2019 IAAF World Cross Country Championships. She finished in 95th place.

In 2019, she also competed in the women's 3000 metres steeplechase event at the Asian Athletics Championships held in Doha, Qatar. She finished in 10th place.
