= List of Kazakhstani records in athletics =

The following are the national records in athletics in Kazakhstan maintained by Athletic Federation of the Republic of Kazakhstan.

== Outdoor ==
Key to tables: Awaiting ratification Record not kept by Athletic Federation of the Republic of Kazakhstan Not ratified or later rescinded by Athletic Federation of the Republic of Kazakhstan

=== Men ===
Event	Record	Athlete	Date	Meet	Place	Ref.
100 m	10.08 (+1.3 m/s)	Vitaliy Savin	13 August 1992		Linz, Austria	
200 m	20.34 (−1.2 m/s)	Vladimir Muravyov	18 August 1984		Moscow, Soviet Union	
400 m	44.94 IRM (Note: ratified by national federation but not recognized by World Athletics)	Mikhail Litvin	8 August 2022	Islamic Solidarity Games	Konya, Turkey	
400 m	45.25 (Note: recognized by World Athletics)	Mikhail Litvin	22 April 2019	Asian Championships	Doha, Qatar	
800 m	1:46.99	Mikhail Kolganov	5 June 2004		Almaty, Kazakhstan	
1000 m	2:17.2 h	Vladimir Volkov	15 June 1981		Kiev, Soviet Union	
1500 m	3:37.54	Vladimir Kalsin	24 June 1984		Kiev, Soviet Union	
3000 m	7:48.35	Sergey Navolokin	14 July 1982		Klagenfurt, Austria	
5000 m	13:35.64	Sergey Navolokin	22 August 1982		Podolsk, Soviet Union	
10,000 m	27:58.9 h	Anatoliy Badrankov	3 November 1978		Tashkent, Soviet Union	
10 km (road)	29:50 (Note: By World Athletics and ARRS source; 29:48 by federation source.)	Mihail Krassilov	28 April 2013	Würzburger Residenzlauf	Würzburg, Germany	
15 km (road)	45:22	Vladimir Gusev	17 November 1996	Pim Mulierloop	Santpoort, Netherlands	
20,000 m (track)	59:55.7+	Nikolay Penzin	19 August 1977		Moscow, Soviet Union	
20 km (road)	1:00:22	Muchamedsjanov	1 June 1970		Moscow, Russia	
One hour	20040 m	Nikolay Penzin	19 August 1977		Moscow, Soviet Union	
Half marathon	1:04:21	Mikhail Krasilov	20 May 2012		Omsk, Russia	
Half marathon	1:04:09	Aleksandr Saprykin	2 April 1995	La Rochelle Half Marathon	La Rochelle, France	
25,000 m (track)	1:16:22.0	Nikolay Penzin	29 April 1979		Helsinki, Finland	
30,000 m (track)	1:32:01.00 (Note: by federation source also listed as road running record)	Juri Laptev	1 October 1977		Leningrad, Soviet Union	
30 km (road)	1:32:01 (Note: by federation source also listed as long-distance track event record)	Juri Laptev	1 October 1977		Leningrad, Soviet Union	
Marathon	2:11:59	Nikolay Penzin	3 September 1978	European Championships	Prague, Czechoslovakia	
110 m hurdles	13.49 (+2.0 m/s)	Igor Khitryakov	5 July 1988		Tallinn, Soviet Union	
400 m hurdles	48.46	Yevgeniy Meleshenko	31 August 2001	Universiade	Beijing, China	
2000 m steeplechase	6:03.55	Islam Amangos	26 April 2013	Kazakhstani Spring Championships	Shymkent, Kazakhstan	
3000 m steeplechase	8:24.13	Artyom Kosinov	11 June 2012	Moscow Challenge	Moscow, Russia	
High jump	2.36 m	Sergey Zasimovich	5 May 1984		Tashkent, Soviet Union	
Pole vault	5.92 m	Igor Potapovich	13 June 1992		Dijon, France	
Long jump	8.16 m	Sergey Vasilenko	18 June 1988		Alma Ata, Soviet Union	
Triple jump	17.58 m (+1.5 m/s)	Oleg Sakirkin	23 July 1989		Gorkiy, Soviet Union	
Shot put	20.95 m	Ivan Ivanov	26 July 2019	National Championships	Almaty, Kazakhstan	
Discus throw	60.30 m	Vitaliy Zhuk	26 April 1975		Alma Ata, Soviet Union	
Discus throw	65.94 (Note: questionable)	Yevgeniy Labutov	12 June 2016	National Championships	Dushanbe, Tajikistan	
Discus throw	62.79 (Note: questionable)	Yevgeniy Labutov	28 May 2016		Dushanbe, Tajikistan	
Hammer throw	77.60 m	Vladimir Lesovoy	27 June 1977		Alma Ata, Soviet Union	
Javelin throw	85.16 m	Viktor Yevsyukov	21 June 1987		Karl-Marx-Stadt, East Germany	
Decathlon	8725 pts	Dmitriy Karpov	23–24 August 2004	Olympic Games	Athens, Greece	
Decathlon	100m (wind) / Long jump (wind) / Shot put / High jump / 400m / 110m H (wind) / Discus / Pole vault / Javelin / 1500m; 10.50 (+2.2 m/s) / 7.81 m (−0.9 m/s) / 15.93 m / 2.09 m / 46.81 / 13.97 (+1.5 m/s) / 51.65 m / 4.60 m / 55.54 m / 4:38.11					
5000 m walk (track)	20:14.3 h	Sabir Sharuyayev	11 September 1999		Almaty, Kazakhstan	
10,000 m walk (track)	39:53.99	Sergey Korepanov	23 May 1999	Kosanov Memorial	Almaty, Kazakhstan	
10 km walk (road)	42:08+	Georgiy Sheiko	19 March 2023	Asian Race Walking Championships	Nomi, Japan	
15 km walk (road)	1:03:42+	Georgiy Sheiko	19 March 2023	Asian Race Walking Championships	Nomi, Japan	
20,000 m walk (track)	1:22:50.3 h	Valeriy Borisov	8 September 2001		Izhevsk, Russia	
20 km walk (road)	1:19:55	Valeriy Borisov	20 April 1996		Sochi, Russia	
30,000 m walk (track)	2:19:09.6	Veniamin Soldatenko	8 June 1972		Moscow, Soviet Union	
50,000 m walk (track)	4:03:42.6	Veniamin Soldatenko	5 October 1972		Moscow, Soviet Union	
50 km walk (road)	3:39:22	Sergey Korepanov	2 May 1999		Mézidon-Canon, France	
4 × 100 m relay	39.30	Kazakh SSR; Yuriy Yazynin; Oleg Borov; Vladimir Muravyov; Vitaliy Savin	31 May 1988		Sochi, Soviet Union	
4 × 200 m relay	1:25.3	Kazakh SSR	26 May 1979		?	
4 × 400 m relay	3:07.66	Kazakhstan; Mikhail Litvin; Andrey Sokolov; David Efremov; Vyacheslav Zems	14 July 2019	Universiade	Naples, Italy	
4 × 800 m relay	7:16.8 h	Kazakh SSR; Karpenko; Vladimir Volkov; Druchinin; Rypakov	9 September 1980		Donetsk, Soviet Union	
Ekiden relay	2:07:07	Kazakhstan; Mikitenko; Wladimir Gusev; Schulin; Polikarpov; Ismarulov	17 April 1994		Litochoro, Greece	

=== Women ===
Event	Record	Athlete	Date	Meet	Place	Ref.
100 m	11.09 (+0.8 m/s)	Olga Safronova	24 May 2016	Kazakhstani Open Cup	Almaty, Kazakhstan	
200 m	22.66 (+0.7 m/s)	Viktoriya Zyabkina	26 June 2016	26th G. Kosanov Memorial	Almaty, Kazakhstan	
400 m	50.68	Tatyana Roslanova	5 June 2004		Almaty, Kazakhstan	
800 m	1:56.0 h	Valentina Gerasimova	12 June 1976		Kiev, Soviet Union	
1000 m	2:47.6 h	Valentina Gerasimova	1 September 1973		Almaty, Soviet Union	
1500 m	4:10.26	Galina Reznikova	22 June 1983		Moscow, Soviet Union	
3000 m	8:48.2 h	Natalya Sorokivskaya	20 August 1988		Odessa, Soviet Union	
3000 m	8:29.89	Caroline Chepkoech Kipkirui (Note: Kenyan born and of Kenyan citizenship by result source, probably not eligible to start for Kazakhstan at this point)	3 May 2019	Diamond League	Doha, Qatar	
5000 m	14:45.69	Daisy Jepkemei	2 June 2022 (Note: by World Athletics source; 1 June 2022 by national federation source)		Montreuil, France	
5 km (road)	15:27+	Caroline Chepkoech Kipkirui (Note: Kenyan born and of Kenyan citizenship by result source, probably eligible to start for Kazakhstan since 2019)	6 April 2019	Prague Half Marathon	Prague, Czech Republic	
10,000 m	30:17.64	Caroline Chepkoech Kipkirui	16 July 2022	World Championships	Eugene, United States	
10 km (road)	32:53	Natalya Sorokivskaya	27 December 1992		Ratingen, Germany	
10 km (road)	30:54+	Caroline Chepkoech Kipkirui (Note: Kenyan born and of Kenyan citizenship by result source, probably not eligible to start for Kazakhstan at this point)	6 April 2019	Prague Half Marathon	Prague, Czech Republic	
15 km (road)	50:28	Zoya Ivanova	20 March 1988		Adelaide, Australia	
15 km (road)	46:21+	Caroline Chepkoech Kipkirui (Note: Kenyan born and of Kenyan citizenship by result source, probably not eligible to start for Kazakhstan at this point)	6 April 2019	Prague Half Marathon	Prague, Czech Republic	
10 miles (road)	52:02	Norah Jeruto	12 April 2026	Cherry Blossom Ten Mile Run	Washington, D.C., United States	
One hour	17288 m+	Tatjana Gridneva	10 May 1987		Almaty, Soviet Union	
20,000 m (track)	1:09:34.1	Tatjana Gridneva	10 May 1987		Almaty, Soviet Union	
20 km (road)	1:07:15	Nadeshda Gumerova	27 March 1983		Shchyolkovo, Soviet Union	
20 km (road)	1:02.23+	Caroline Chepkoech Kipkirui (Note: Kenyan born and of Kenyan citizenship by result source, probably not eligible to start for Kazakhstan at this point)	6 April 2019	Prague Half Marathon	Prague, Czech Republic	
Half marathon	1:12:52	Garifa Kuku	24 September 1994		Oslo, Norway	
Half marathon	1:05.44	Caroline Chepkoech Kipkirui (Note: Kenyan born and of Kenyan citizenship by result source, probably not eligible to start for Kazakhstan at this point)	6 April 2019	Prague Half Marathon	Prague, Czech Republic	
Half marathon	1:11:44	Garifa Kuku	12 August 2000	Almaty Half Marathon	Almaty, Kazakhstan	
Half marathon	1:12:05	Natalya Sorokivskaya	10 January 1993	Egmond Half Marathon	Egmond aan Zee, Netherlands	
25 km (road)	1:32:09	Garifa Baishanova	5 October 1991		Lisbon, Portugal	
25 km (road)	1:28:32	Zoya Ivanova	30 September 1990		Glasgow, United Kingdom	
25 km (road)	1:27:05+	Zhanna Mamazhanova	10 April 2022	Rotterdam Marathon	Rotterdam, Netherlands	
30,000 m (track)	1:46:30	Nadeshda Gumerova	7 July 1980		Moscow, Soviet Union	
30 km (road)	1:46:08	Garifa Baishanova	10 May 1987		Moscow, Soviet Union	
30 km (road)	1:44:34+	Zhanna Mamazhanova	10 April 2022	Rotterdam Marathon	Rotterdam, Netherlands	
Marathon	2:26:54	Zhanna Mamazhanova	10 April 2022	Rotterdam Marathon	Rotterdam, Netherlands	
100 km (road)	7:46:44	Nadeshda Gumerova	19 June 1993		Torhout, Belgium	
100 m hurdles	12.44 (−0.8 m/s)	Olga Shishigina	27 June 1995		Lucerne, Switzerland	
400 m hurdles	54.50	Natalya Torshina	27 May 2000		Vila Real de Santo António, Portugal	
3000 m steeplechase	8:53.02	Norah Jeruto	20 July 2022	World Championships	Eugene, United States	
High jump	2.01 m	Olga Turchak	7 July 1986		Moscow, Russia	
Pole vault	4.20 m (Note: recognised by World Athletics but not ratified/listed by Athletic Federation of the Republic of Kazakhstan)	Olga Lapina	17 May 2014	Busan International Pole Vault Meeting	Busan, South Korea	
Long jump	7.31 m (+1.5 m/s)	Yelena Khlopotnova	12 September 1985		Alma Ata, Soviet Union	
Triple jump	15.25 m (+1.7 m/s)	Olga Rypakova	4 September 2010	Continental Cup	Split, Croatia	
Shot put	19.26 m	Yelena Ortina	10 August 1986		Chelyabinsk, Soviet Union	
Discus throw	68.18 m	Tatyana Lesovaya	23 September 1982		Alma Ata, Soviet Union	
Hammer throw	62.50 m	Diana Nusupbekova	25 May 2016		Almaty, Kazakhstan	
Hammer throw	64.78 m	Diana Nusupbekova	13 June 2016		Dushanbe, Tajikistan	
Javelin throw	52.76 m	Varvara Nazarova	4 June 2016	Asian Junior Championships	Ho Chi Minh City, Vietnam	
Heptathlon	6272 pts	Yelena Davydova	13–14 July 1987		Zagreb, Yugoslavia	
Heptathlon	100m H (wind) / High jump / Shot put / 200m (wind) / Long jump (wind) / Javelin / 800m; 14.33 / 1.89 m / 12.77 m / 25.07 / 6.37 m / 47.14 m / 2:15.56					
Decathlon	7798 pts	Irina Naumenko	25–26 September 2004	Decastar	Talence, France	
Decathlon	100m (wind) / Discus / Pole vault / Javelin / 400m / 100m H (wind) / Long jump (wind) / Shot put / High jump / 1500m; 12.58 / 34.63 m / 3.30 m / 37.57 m / 55.91 / 14.42 / 5.98 m / 12.51 m / 1.77 m / 4:59.03					
5000 m walk (track)	21:01.11	Svetlana Tolstaya	23 May 1999	Kosanov Memorial	Almaty, Kazakhstan	
10,000 m walk (track)	43:51.0 h	Svetlana Tolstaya	17 September 1997		Almaty, Kazakhstan	
10 km walk (road)	42:32	Maya Sazonova	20 April 1996		Sochi, Russia	
20,000 m walk (track)	1:36:45.77	Yelena Kuznetsova	23 August 2002	Kazakhstani Championships	Almaty, Kazakhstan	
20 km walk (road)	1:28:38	Svetlana Tolstaya	25 May 2002		Cheboksary, Russia	
35 km walk (road)	2:54:50	Galina Yakusheva	22 July 2022	World Championships	Eugene, United States	
4 × 100 m relay	42.92	Kazakhstan; Rima Kashafutdinova; Viktoriya Zyabkina; Yuliya Rakhmanova; Olga Safronova	4 July 2016		Almaty, Kazakhstan	
4 × 200 m relay	1:37.5 h	Kazakh SSR; Bekker; Iljina; Kasakova; Fadeeva	11 October 1965		Moscow, Soviet Union	
4 × 400 m relay	3:30.03	Kazakhstan; Marina Maslyonko; Viktoriya Yalovtseva; Margarita Matsko; Olga Tereshkova	26 November 2010	Asian Games	Guangzhou, China	
4 × 800 m relay	8:30.3 h	Kazakh SSR; Fudaneva; Solovjeva; Apalikova; Gerasimova	24 July 1979		Moscow, Soviet Union	

=== Mixed ===
Event	Record	Athlete	Date	Meet	Place	Ref.
4 × 400 m relay	3:16.75	Kazakhstan; Andrey Sokolov; Mariya Shuvalova; Elnur Mukhitdinov; Adelina Zems	20 June 2026	2nd Asian Relays Championships	Shaoxing, China	

== Indoor ==
=== Men ===
Event	Record	Athlete	Date	Meet	Place	Ref.
50 m	5.69+	Gennadiy Chernovol	24 February 2002	Meeting Pas de Calais	Liévin, France	
55 m	6.28 A	Vitaliy Medvedev	22 February 2002	WAC Championships	Reno, United States	
60 m	6.49 (Note: Doubtful timing; not recognized by World Athletics.)	Vitaliy Savin	21 February 1991		Moscow, Russia	
200 m	20.95	Gennadiy Chernovol	18 February 2001		Tianjin, China	
300 m	33.67	Gennadiy Chernovol	7 January 2002		Yekaterinburg, Russia	
400 m	46.26	Mikhail Litvin	19 January 2019		Oskemen, Kazakhstan	
800 m	1:48.89	Mihail Kolganov	17 February 2004		Moscow, Russia	
1000 m	2:24.00	Mihail Kolganov	7 January 2006		Yekaterinburg, Russia	
1500 m	3:45.15	Vladimir Kalsin	12 February 1982		Moscow, Soviet Union	
3000 m	7:51.52	Maksim Korolev	8 February 2014	David Hemery Valentine Invitational	Boston, United States	
5000 m	13:42.56	Maksim Korolev	25 January 2014	BU John Thomas Terrier Invitational	Boston, United States	
50 m hurdles	6.4 h	Andrey Sklyarenko	7 January 1999		Yekaterinburg, Russia	
60 m hurdles	7.65	David Yefremov	20 February 2021		Oskemen, Kazakhstan	
60 m hurdles	7.59	David Yefremov	27 January 2024	Astana Indoor Meeting	Astana, Kazakhstan	
60 m hurdles	7.5 h	Igor Khitryakov	19 January 1992		Karaganda, Kazakhstan	
High jump	2.32 m	Sergey Zasimovich	12 January 1985		Vilnius, Soviet Union	
Pole vault	5.92 m	Igor Potapovich	19 February 1998	GE Galan	Stockholm, Sweden	
Long jump	7.99 m	Dmitriy Karpov	8 February 2004		Moscow, Russia	
Triple jump	17.36 m	Oleg Sakirkin	4 February 1990		Chelyabinsk, Russia	
Shot put	20.51 m (Note: Ratified despite to the lack of doping control.)	Ivan Ivanov	30 January 2016	Kazakhstani Championships	Oskemen, Kazakhstan	
Heptathlon	6229 pts	Dmitriy Karpov	15–16 February 2008		Tallinn, Estonia	
Heptathlon	60m / Long jump / Shot put / High jump / 60m H / Pole vault / 1000m; 7.07 / 7.21 m / 16.23 m / 2.07 m / 7.99 / 5.15 m / 2:43.69					
5000 m walk	19:14.00	Sergey Korepanov	28 January 1995		Karaganda, Kazakhstan	
5000 m walk	19:05.0	Vladimir Ostrovskiy	7 January 1990		Karaganda, Kazakhstan	
4 × 200 m relay	1:26.70	Karaganda Team; Vitaliy Zems; Vladislav Grigoryev; Vyacheslav Zems; David Efremov	15 January 2018 (Note: by World Athletics source; 15 February 2018 by federation source)	Kazakhstani Championships	Oskemen, Kazakhstan	
4 × 400 m relay	3:11.68	Kazakhstan; Andrey Sokolov; Sergey Zaykov; Dmitriy Koblov; Mikhail Litvin	3 February 2018	Asian Championships	Tehran, Iran	
4 × 400 m relay	3:09.15	Kazakhstan; Andrey Sokolov; Elnur Mukhitdinov; Vyacheslav Zems; Mikhail Litvin	12 February 2023	Asian Championships	Astana, Kazakhstan	

=== Women ===
Event	Record	Athlete	Date	Meet	Place	Ref.
60 m	7.20	Viktoriya Zyabkina	29 January 2016	Kazakhstani Championships	Oskemen, Kazakhstan	
200 m	23.25	Svetlana Bodritskaya	7 March 1997	World Championships	Paris, France	
200 m	23.25	Viktoriya Zyabkina	30 January 2016	Kazakhstani Championships	Oskemen, Kazakhstan	
400 m	52.53	Elina Mikhina	16 February 2018	Kazakhstani Championships	Oskemen, Kazakhstan	
800 m	2:02.0 h	Valentina Gerasimova	15 February 1980		Moscow, Soviet Union	
1000 m	2:44.8 h	Galina Resnikova	1984		?	
1500 m	4:16.96	Svetlana Lukasheva	15 November 2005	Asian Indoor Games	Pattaya, Thailand	
3000 m	8:57.42	Norah Jeruto	26 February 2022	Kazakhstani Championships	Oskemen, Kazakhstan	
3000 m	8:46.87	Norah Jeruto	7 February 2026	Asian Championships	Tianjin, China	
5000 m	15:48.34	Natalya Sorokivaskaya	3 February 1990		Chelyabinsk, Soviet Union	
50 m hurdles	6.70	Olga Shishigina	5 February 1999		Budapest, Hungary	
60 m hurdles	7.82	Olga Shishigina	21 February 1999	Meeting Pas de Calais	Liévin, France	
High jump	1.98 m	Svetlana Zalevskaya	2 March 1996		Samara, Russia	
High jump	1.98 m	Nadezhda Dubovitskaya	19 March 2022	World Championships	Belgrade, Serbia	
Pole vault	4.15 m	Olga Lapina	8 February 2011		Karaganda, Kazakhstan	
Long jump	7.17 m	Yelena Kokonova	16 February 1985		Chişinău, Soviet Union	
Triple jump	15.14 m	Olga Rypakova	13 March 2010	World Championships	Doha, Qatar	
Shot put	18.68 m	Yelena Ortina-Baltabayeva	2 February 1992		Moscow, Russia	
Shot put	18.69 m	Yelena Ortina-Baltabayeva	26 January 1992		Moscow, Russia	
Pentathlon	4582 pts	Olga Rypakova	10 February 2006	Asian Championships	Pattaya, Thailand	
Pentathlon	60m H / High jump / Shot put / Long jump / 800m; 8.68 / 1.88 m / 12.90 m / 6.55 m / 2:23.26					
3000 m walk	12:59.5 h	Maya Sazonova	22 January 1993		Karaganda, Kazakhstan	
5000 m walk	24:22.41	Yasmina Toksanbayeva	17 February 2022	Kazakh U20 Indoor Championships	Oskemen, Kazakhstan	
4 × 200 m relay	1:36.40	Kazakhstan; Anastasiya Tulapina; Yuliya Rakhmanova; Aygerim Shynyzbekova; Viktoriya Zyabkina	11 February 2017	Kazakh Championships	Oskemen, Kazakhstan	
4 × 400 m relay	3:37.59	Kazakhstan; Tatyana Khadjimuratova; Tatyana Azarova; Anna Gavryushenko; Olga Tereshkova	1 November 2007	Asian Indoor Games	Macau	
