= Lomi Muleta =

Ethiopian athlete (born 2001)

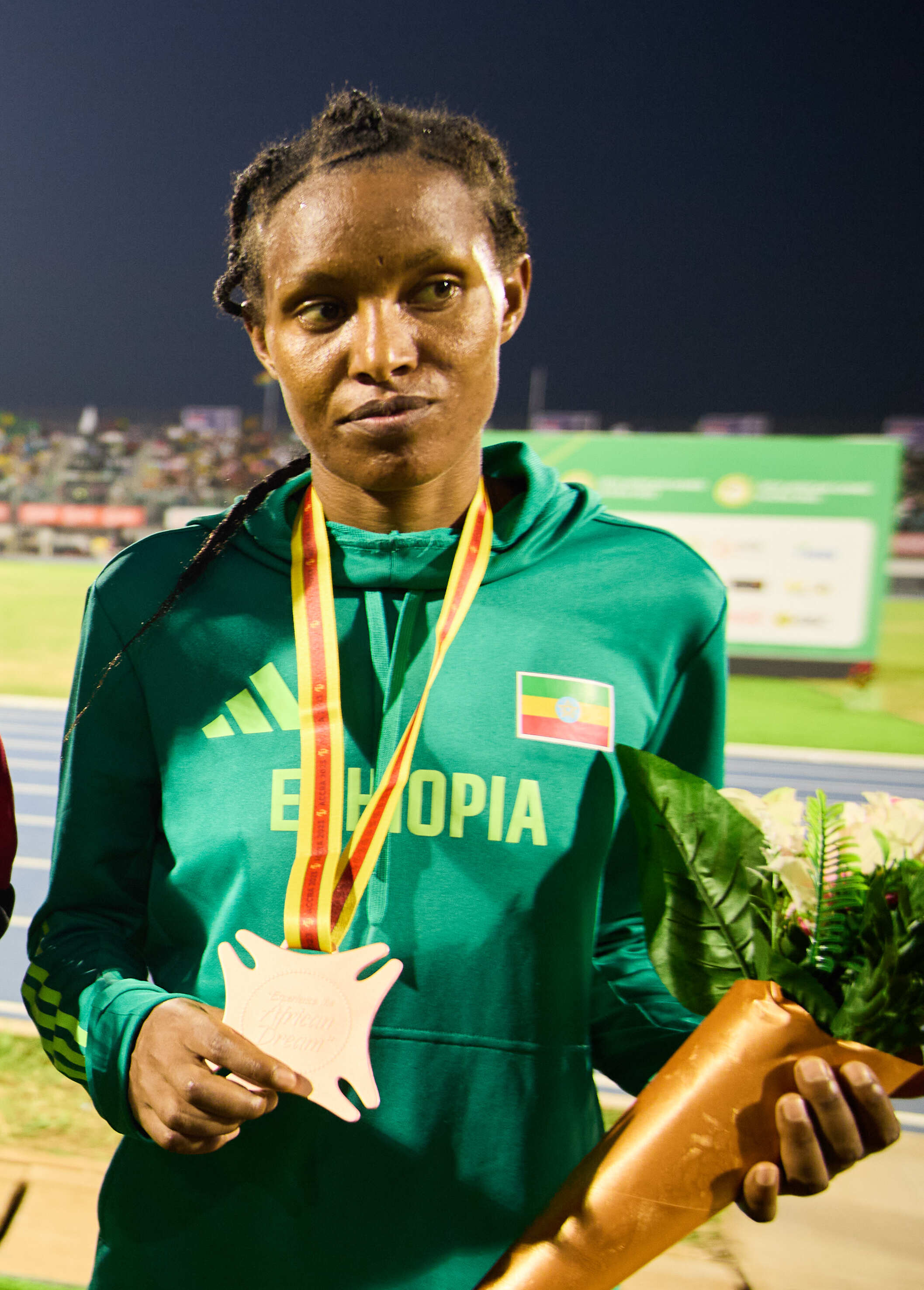
- Muleta in 2024

Personal information
- Full name: Lomi Muleta Tefera
- Nationality: Ethiopian
- Born: 29 November 2001 (age 24) Gusha Temela, Arsi Zone, Oromia, Ethiopia

Sport
- Sport: Athletics
- Event: Steeplechase
Medal record
Women's athletics
Representing Ethiopia
African Games
Bronze medal – third place	2023 Accra	3000 m st.

Lomi Muleta Tefera (born 29 November 2001) is an Ethiopian athlete. She competed in the women's 3000 metres steeplechase event at the 2019 World Athletics Championships.

She competed in the women's 3000 metres steeplechase at the 2020 Summer Olympics and the 2024 Summer Olympics.
