= Xu Shuangshuang =

Chinese athletics competitor

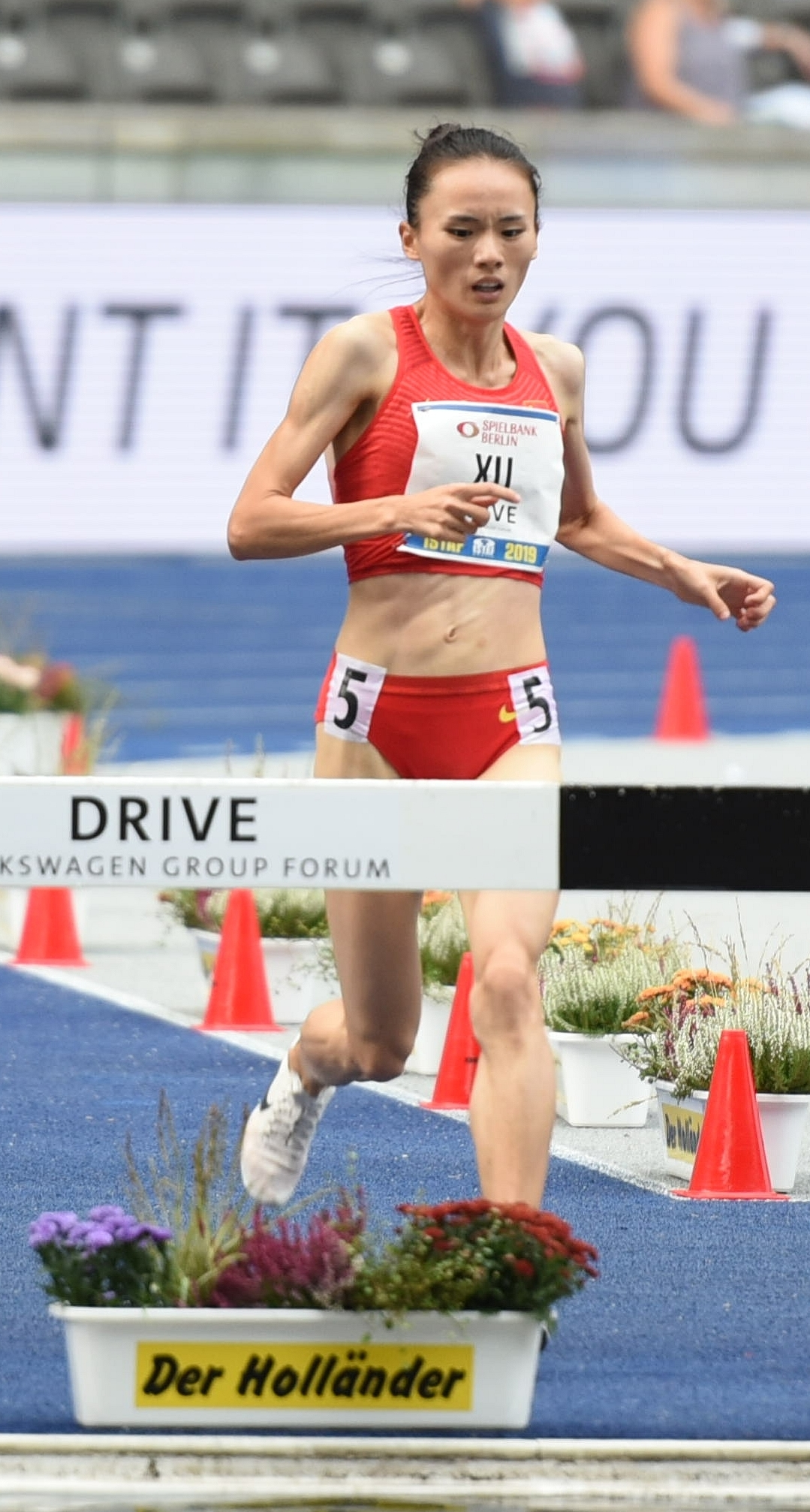
- Xu Shuangshuang in 2019

Personal information
- Native name: 许双双
- Born: 6 April 1996 (age 30) Chongqing, China

Sport
- Country: China
- Sport: Athletics
- Events: 3000 metres steeplechase, 5000 metres
- Team: Shanghai
Medal record
Women's athletics
Representing China
Asian Athletics Championships
Silver medal – second place	2019 Doha	3000 m s'chase
Silver medal – second place	2023 Bangkok	3000 m s'chase

Xu Shuangshuang (born 6 April 1996) is a Chinese athletics competitor. She competed in the women's 3000 metres steeplechase event at the 2020 Summer Olympics in Tokyo, Japan and the same event at the 2024 Summer Olympics in Paris, France.

In 2019, she competed in the women's 3000 metres steeplechase event at the World Athletics Championships held in Doha, Qatar. A year earlier, she competed in the women's 3000 metres steeplechase at the 2018 Asian Games held in Jakarta and Palembang, Indonesia.

She competed in the women's 3000 metres steeplechase event at the 2022 World Athletics Championships held in Eugene, Oregon, United States.
