= Faith Cherotich =

Kenyan steeplechase runner

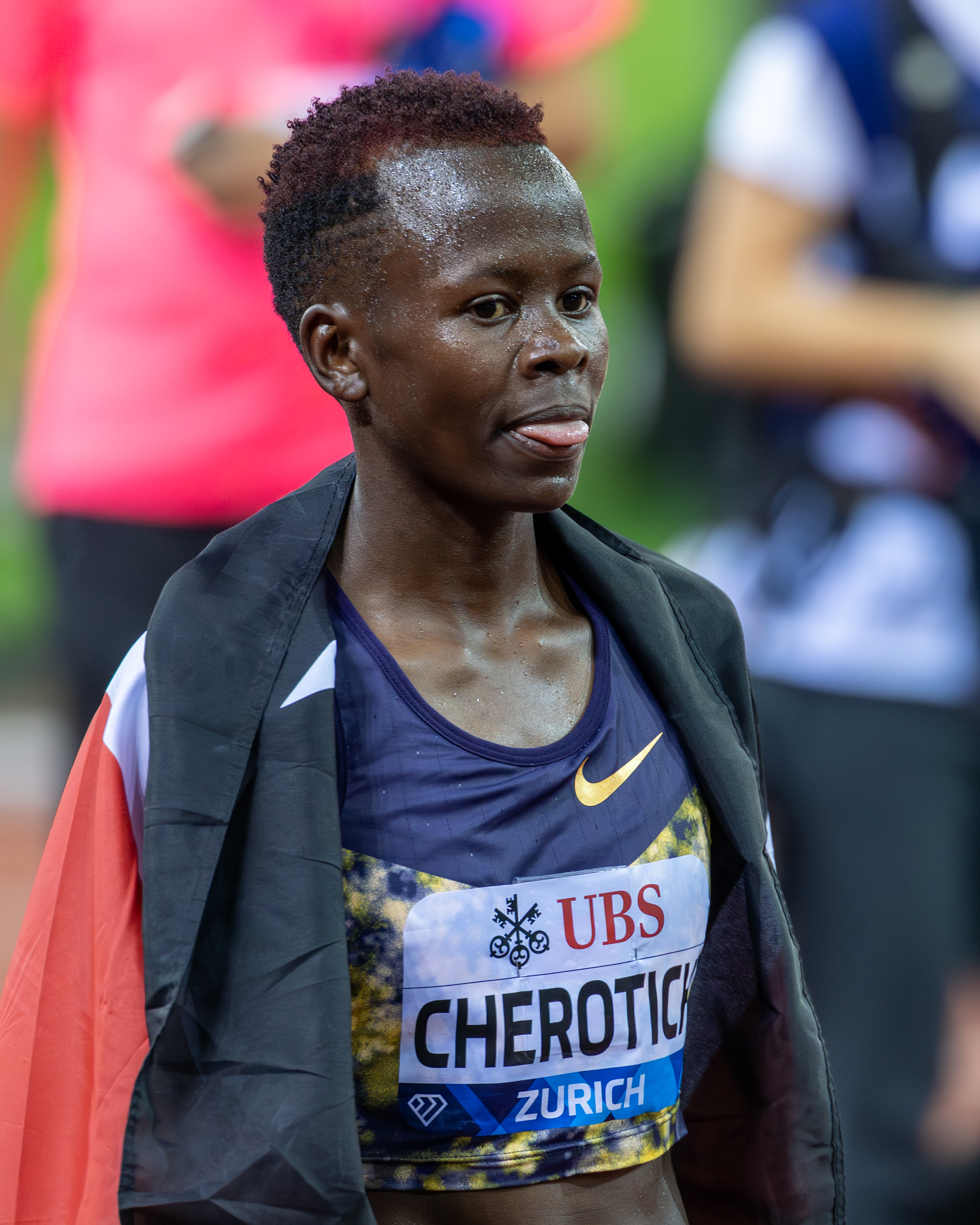
- Cherotich at the 2026 Weltklasse Zürich

Personal information
- Born: 13 July 2004 (age 22) Kericho County, Kenya

Sport
- Country: Kenya
- Sport: Athletics
- Event: 3000 metres steeplechase

Achievements and titles
- Personal bests: Outdoor; 1500 m: 4:11.81 (2022); Mile: 4:28.97 (2022); 5000 m: 15:03.78 (2024); 3000 m sc: 8:48.71 (2025)
Medal record
Women's athletics
Representing Kenya
Olympic Games
Bronze medal – third place	2024 Paris	3000 m st.
World Championships
Gold medal – first place	2025 Tokyo	3000 m st.
Bronze medal – third place	2023 Budapest	3000 m st.
Diamond League
First place	2024	3000 m st.
First place	2025	3000 m st.
First place	2026	3000 m st.
World U20 Championships
Gold medal – first place	2022 Cali	3000 m st.
Bronze medal – third place	2021 Nairobi	3000 m st.
World Cross Country Championships
Silver medal – second place	2023 Bathurst	Junior team
Bronze medal – third place	2023 Bathurst	Junior race
Commonwealth Games
Gold medal – first place	2026 Glasgow	3000 m st.

Faith Cherotich (born 13 July 2004) is a Kenyan athlete who specializes in the 3000 metres steeplechase.

== Career ==
At the age of 17, Faith Cherotich competed in, won the bronze medal at, the 2021 World Athletics Under-20 Championships held in Nairobi, Kenya. Cherotich won the gold medal competing at the same event a year later, winning the title at the World U20 Championships in Cali, Colombia. In 2025, she won gold in the 2025 World Athletics Championships in Tokyo, Japan, in the 3000m steeplechase.

Faith Cherotich is coached by former Dutch athlete Piet de Peuter and Bernard Rono.
