= Norah Jeruto =

Kenyan steeplechase runner

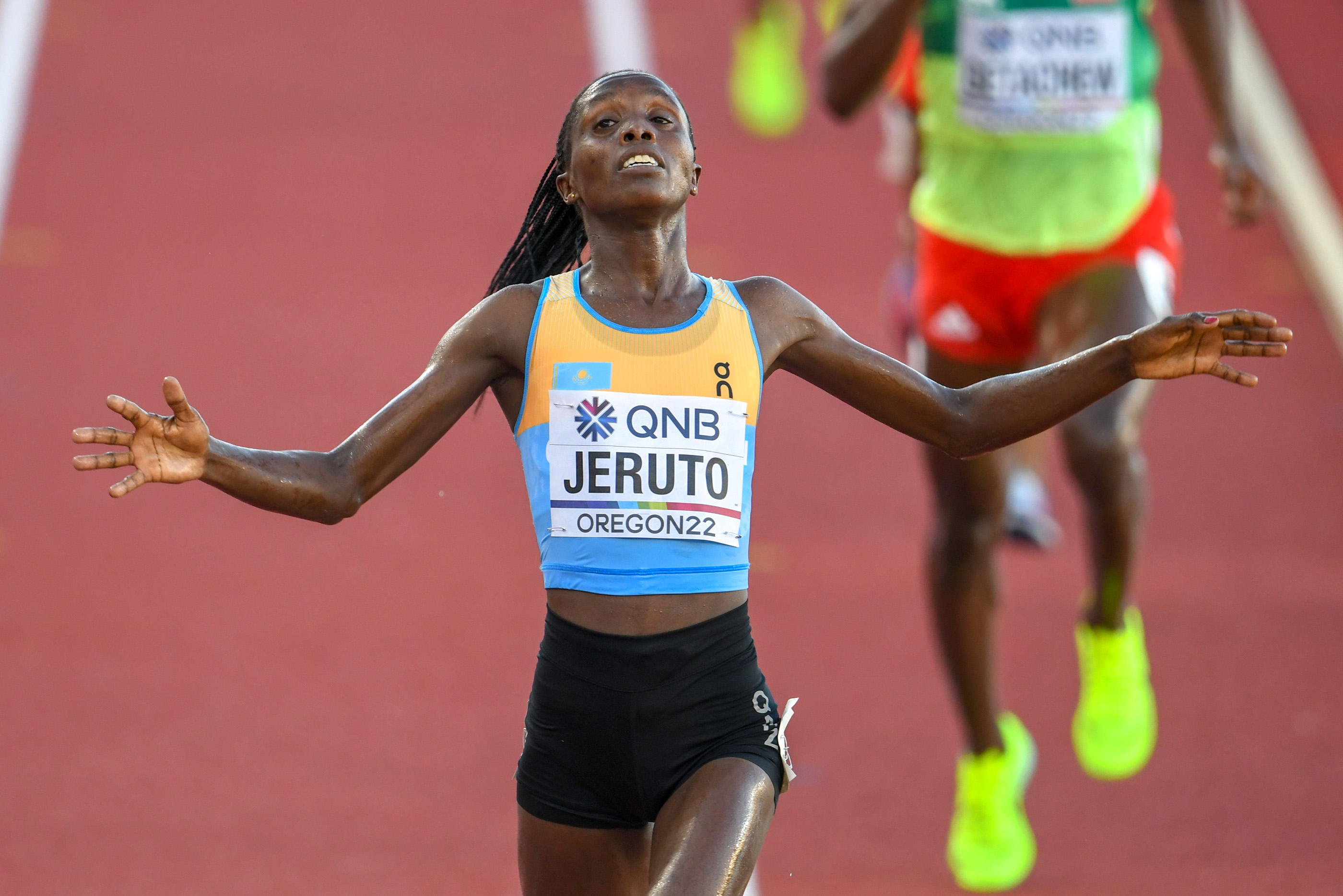
- Jeruto at the 2022 World Athletics Championships

Personal information
- Full name: Norah Jeruto Tanui
- Nationality: Kenyan; Kazakhstani
- Born: 2 October 1995 (age 31)

Sport
- Country: Kazakhstan (since 2022)
- Sport: Athletics
- Events: 3000 m steeplechase, Long-distance running
- Club: Altay Athletics

Achievements and titles
- Personal bests: 3000 m s'chase: 8:53.02 NR (Eugene 2022)
Medal record
Women's Athletics
Representing Kazakhstan
World Championships
Gold medal – first place	2022 Eugene	3000 m st.
Asian Indoor Athletics Championships
Gold medal – first place	2026 Tianjin	3000 m
Bronze medal – third place	2026 Tianjin	1500 m
Representing Kenya
Diamond League
First place	2021	3000 m st.
African Championships
Gold medal – first place	2016 Durban	3000 m st.

Norah Jeruto Tanui (Kazakh: Нора Джеруто Тануй, born 2 October 1995) is a Kazakhstani long-distance runner specialising in the steeplechase. She won the gold medal in the 3000 metres steeplechase at the 2022 World Championships, becoming the first athlete representing Kazakhstan to win a title at the World Athletics Championships and setting a championship record in the process. Formerly a Kenyan athlete, Jeruto took gold in the event at the 2016 African Championships in Athletics.

She was the 2021 Diamond League 3000 m steeplechase champion. Currently Jeruto is an athlete of Altay Athletics club (professional track and field club) in Kazakhstan.

== Career ==
Her international debut came at the 2011 African Cross Country Championships, where she placed sixth in the junior race to complete a Kenyan sweep of the top six. She ran the third fastest time ever for the 2000 metres steeplechase at the 2011 World Youth Championships in Athletics, recording 6:16.41 minutes to take the gold in spite of a heavy fall at the waterjump. Later that year she claimed the steeplechase title at the 2011 Commonwealth Youth Games, as well as a bronze in the 3000 metres flat. She missed out on selection for the 2012 World Junior Championships in Athletics.

She set a 3000 metres steeplechase best of 9:45.1 minutes at age fifteen, but struggled to improve on that in subsequent seasons. She was selected for Kenya's junior team at the 2015 IAAF World Cross Country Championships, but did not compete.

After a runner-up performance at the Kenyan Athletics Championships, setting a best of 9:28.5 minutes behind Lydia Rotich, Jeruto made her senior international debut at the 2016 African Championships in Athletics. A personal best run of 9:25.07 minutes at the competition brought her the steeplechase gold medal and a championship record.

Despite her ranking, she didn't participate at 2020 Tokyo Olympics, because she was still waiting for her Kazakhstan citizenship which she obtained on 30 January 2022.

=== 2022–present ===
On May 28, 2022, at the Prefontaine Classic in Eugene, Oregon (third stop of the Diamond League) she ran the third fastest time ever by a woman at the 3000 m steeplechase in 8:57.98. setting a world lead. She could've shaved half a second of that time as she thought she crossed the line 2–3 meters before the actual finish line.

On 20 July, she became the first athlete representing Kazakhstan to win a gold medal at the World Athletics Championships, establishing a new championship and national record of 8:53.02 in the process at the same Hayward Field in Eugene.

In April 2023, she was provisionally suspended by the Athletics Integrity Unit for the use of an unidentified prohibited substance/method from her biological passport (ABP) data. Jeruto's explanation of COVID-19 and ulcers affecting blood samples was deemed plausible and she was acquitted with the suspension lifted in November 2023 by the independent World Athletics Disciplinary Tribunal. Although World Athletics appealed against the decision, the CAS dismissed their appeal in June 2024.

Jeruto placed ninth in the final of the 3000 m steeplechase at the 2024 Olympics in Paris.

== Achievements ==
=== International competitions ===
Year	Competition	Venue	Position	Event	Time
Representing Kenya
2011	African Cross Country Championships	Cape Town, South Africa	6th	Junior race	20:53
2011	African Cross Country Championships	Cape Town, South Africa	1st	Junior team	
2011	World Youth Championships	Villeneuve-d'Ascq, France	1st	2000 m s'chase	6:16.41 WYL
2011	Commonwealth Youth Games	Douglas, Isle of Man	3rd	3000 m	9:24.02
2011	Commonwealth Youth Games	Douglas, Isle of Man	1st	2000 m s'chase	6:28.10 GR
2016	African Championships	Durban, South Africa	1st	3000 m s'chase	9:25.07 CR
Representing Kazakhstan
2022	World Championships	Eugene, OR, United States	1st	3000 m s'chase	8:53.02 CR NR
2024	Olympic Games	Paris, France	9th	3000 m s'chase	9:08.97
2025	Asian Championships	Gumi, South Korea	1st	5000 m	14:58.71
2025	Asian Championships	Gumi, South Korea	1st	3000 m s'chase	9:10.46
2026	Asian Indoor Championships	Tianjin, China	3rd	1500 m	4:20.04
2026	Asian Indoor Championships	Tianjin, China	1st	3000 m	8:46.87
2026	World Indoor Championships	Toruń, Poland	10th	3000 m	9:04.22

=== Personal bests ===
- 3000 metres – 8:33.61 (Zagreb 2018)
  - 3000 metres indoor – 8:49.89 (Ostrava 2018)
- 5000 metres – 14:51.73 (Berlin 2019)
- 2000 m steeplechase – 6:16.41 (Lille 2011)
- 3000 m steeplechase – 8:53.02 (Eugene, OR 2022) NR

Road

- 5 kilometres – 14:42 (Lille 2021)
- 10 kilometres – 29:51 (Valencia 2020)

=== Circuit wins and titles, National titles ===
- Diamond League champion 3000 m steeplechase: 2021

3000 metres steeplechase wins, other events specified in parentheses

- 2017: Oslo Bislett Games
- 2019: Oslo (WL MR)
- 2021: Doha Diamond League, Eugene Prefontaine Classic (WL MR PB), Zürich Weltklasse
- 2022: Eugene (WL)

- Kazakhstani Athletics Championships
  - 3000 m steeplechase: 2022
