= Parul Chaudhary =

Indian athlete (born 1995)

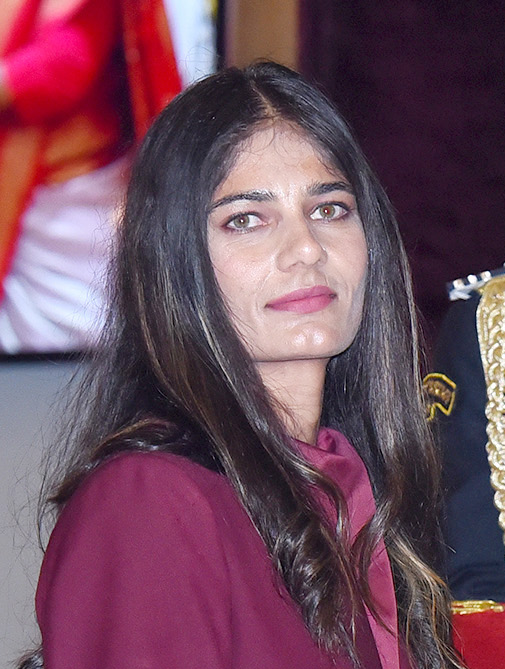
- Chaudhary in 2024

Personal information
- Born: 15 April 1995 (age 31) Iklauta, Uttar Pradesh, India
- Police career
- Branch: Uttar Pradesh Police
- Service years: 2024–present
- Rank: Deputy Superintendent of Police

Sport
- Sport: Athletics
- Events: 3000 m steeplechase, 5000 m

Achievements and titles
- Personal bests: 1500 m: 4:09.46 (2026); 3000 m: 8:57.19 NR (2022); 3000 m steeplechase: 9:08.67 NR (2026); 5000 m: 15:04.26 NR (2026)
Medal record
Women's athletics
Representing India
Asian Games
| Gold medal – first place | 2022 Hangzhou | 5000 m |
| Silver medal – second place | 2022 Hangzhou | 3000 m steeplechase |
| Bronze medal – third place | 2026 Aichi–Nagoya | 3000 m steeplechase |
| Bronze medal – third place | 2026 Aichi–Nagoya | 5000 m |
Asian Championships
| Gold medal – first place | 2023 Bangkok | 3000 m steeplechase |
| Silver medal – second place | 2023 Bangkok | 5000 m |
| Silver medal – second place | 2025 Gumi | 3000 m steeplechase |
| Silver medal – second place | 2025 Gumi | 5000 m |
| Bronze medal – third place | 2019 Doha | 5000 m |
South Asian Games
| Silver medal – second place | 2019 Kathmandu | 5000 m |

Parul Chaudhary (born 15 April 1995) is an Indian track athlete who specializes in 3000 m steeplechase and 5000 m. She has represented India in both the events at the 2024 Paris Olympics.

== Early and personal life ==
Chaudhary hails from Iklauta village, near Meerut. She is one of four children of Krishanpal Chaudhary and Rajesh Devi. Parul ran barefoot as a teenager and competed in 800 m in her school starting 2011.

She switched to 1500 m and 3000 m, before taking to 5000 m and competed professionally in the latter event along with 3000 m steeplechase. It helped her land a job with the Western Railway in 2015 when she moved to Mumbai.

She was appointed as Deputy Superintendent of Police (DSP) with the Uttar Pradesh Police on 27 January 2024 and began her duties in Moradabad district.

== Career ==
In July 2023, Chaudhary won a gold in women's 3000 m steeplechase in the Asian Athletics Championships held at Bangkok. In August, at the World Athletics Championships held in Budapest, she registered personal best time and national record in 3000 m steeplechase with a time of 9:15.31, in the process, qualifying for the 2024 Paris Olympics. At the Hangzhou Asian Games in October 2023, she claimed gold in the 5000 m event and silver in 3000 m steeplechase.

== Awards ==
- Arjuna Award 2023.
- Named in Forbes India 30 under-30 2024.
