= Beatrice Chepkoech =

Kenyan long-distance runner (born 1991)

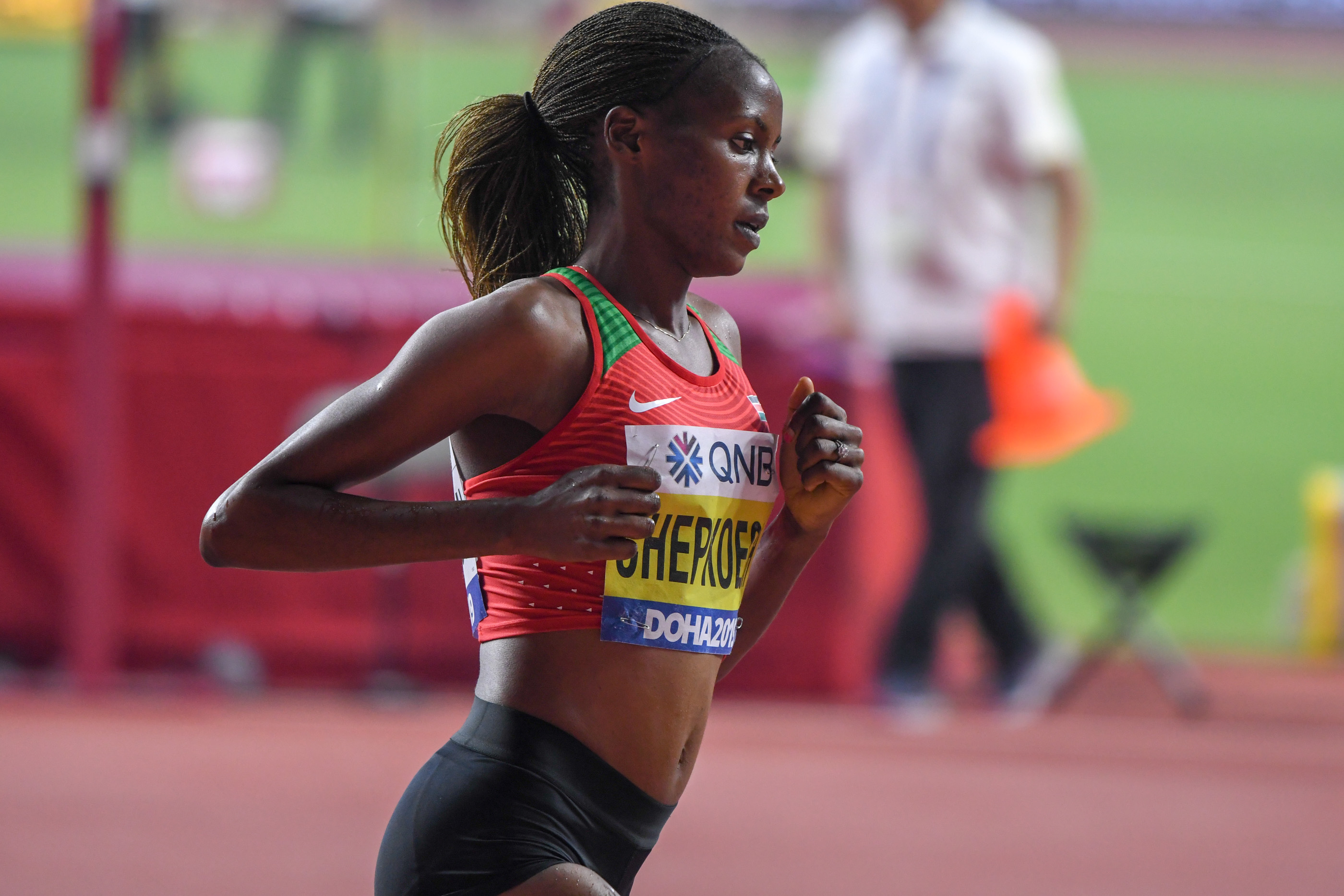
- Chepkoech at the 2019 World Athletics Championships in Doha

Personal information
- Full name: Beatrice Chepkoech Sitonik
- Born: 6 July 1991 (age 35) Kimulot, Bomet County, Kenya
- Height: 1.70 m (5 ft 7 in)
- Weight: 54 kg (119 lb)

Sport
- Country: Kenya
- Sport: Athletics
- Events: 3000 metres steeplechase; Middle-, Long-distance running
- Coached by: Bram Som, Peter Mwai Ndichu

Achievements and titles
- Personal bests: 3000 m st.: 8:44.32 WR (Monaco 2018)
Medal record
Women's athletics
Representing Kenya
World Championships
Gold medal – first place	2019 Doha	3000 m st.
Silver medal – second place	2023 Budapest	3000 m st.
World Indoor Championships
Bronze medal – third place	2024 Glasgow	3000 m
Diamond League
First place	2018	3000 m st.
First place	2019	3000 m st.
Commonwealth Games
Silver medal – second place	2018 Gold Coast	1500 m
African Games
Gold medal – first place	2023 Accra	3000 m st.
Bronze medal – third place	2015 Brazzaville	1500 m
African Championships
Gold medal – first place	2018 Asaba	3000 m st.
Continental Cup
Gold medal – first place	2018 Ostrava	3000 m st.
World Cross Country Championships
Gold medal – first place	2017 Kampala	Mixed relay
Silver medal – second place	2019 Aarhus	Senior team

Beatrice Chepkoech Sitonik (born 6 July 1991) is a Kenyan long-distance runner who specialises in the 3000 metres steeplechase. She won gold medals at the 2019 World Championships and 2018 African Championships and silver medal at the 2023 World Championships. In the 1500 metres, Chepkoech took silver at the 2018 Commonwealth Games and bronze at the 2015 African Games. She is the world record holder for the 3000 m steeplechase with a time of 8:44.32 set in 2018 in Monaco. With that mark she became the first woman to break the 8:50 and 8:45 barriers in the event.

Chepkoech is a two-time 3000 m steeplechase Diamond League champion and won two Kenyan national titles.

== Career ==
Beatrice Chepkoech began her career in road running, taking top three placings at several low-key races in Germany and Netherlands in 2014. She switched to track running in 2015 and set a 1500 metres personal best of 4:03.28 to win the race at the KBC Night of Athletics. This time placed her just outside the top twenty athletes for the season and she was the fifth-fastest Kenyan. A bronze medal in the event followed at the 2015 African Games.

Chepkoech ended her 2015 season with a run in the 2000 metres steeplechase at the ISTAF Berlin, finishing a close second in a quality field and beating 2015 world bronze steeplechase medallist Gesa Felicitas Krause. This prompted her to try the full 3000 m Olympic event. She made a successful transition and the steeplechase her main focus in 2016. On the Diamond League circuit she ran 9:17.41 for fourth at the Prefontaine Classic in Eugene before taking second at the BAUHAUS-galan in Stockholm. Chepkoech ranked fifth in the world upon entry to the 2016 Rio Olympics, where she finished fourth with a time of 9:16.05. She set a new personal best of 9:10.86 in Paris later that month.

In 2017, Chepkoech won her first Diamond League race, taking 3000 m steeplechase victory in Paris with a time of 9:01.69. At the London World Championships in August, she missed a water jump and had to run back in the final, finishing a disappointing fourth in 9:10.45. At the end of August, she broke for the first time the nine-minute barrier, clocking 8:59.84 for second in Zürich circuit final.

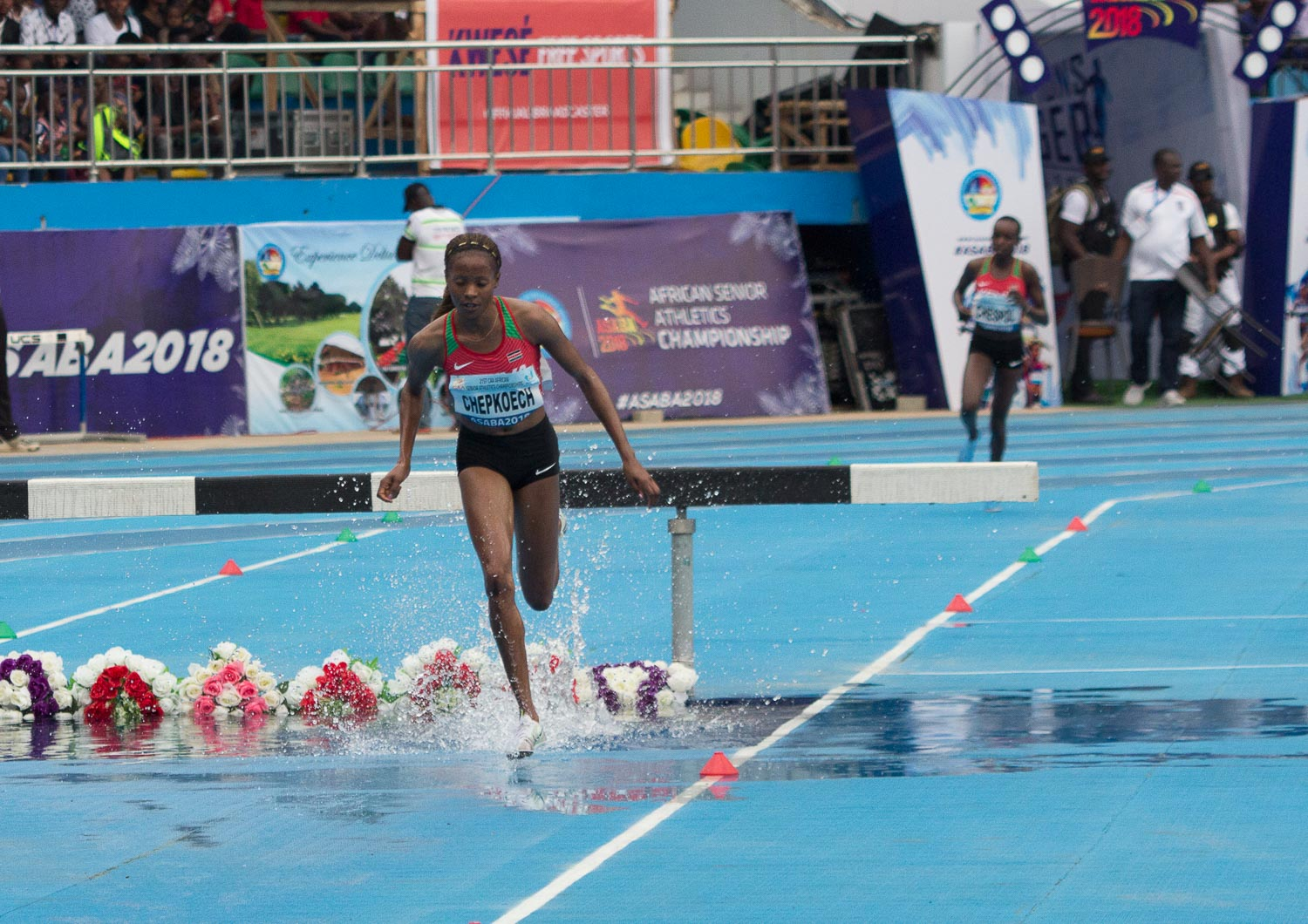
Chepkoech races at the 2018 African Championship in Asaba, Nigeria.

She finished second in the 1500 m at the 2018 Commonwealth Games held in Gold Coast, Australia. On 20 July that year, the 27-year-old obliterated the women's 3000 m steeplechase world record by more than eight seconds with a time of 8:44.32 at the Monaco Herculis meeting (highlights Video on YouTube). She beat the mark of 8:52.78 set by Kenyan-born-Bahraini Ruth Jebet in 2016. Chepkoech then claimed the gold medal in the event at the African Championships the following month, setting a championship record of 8:59.88 in the process. She earned her first Diamond League title in her specialist event that year, securing three victories out of the five events, including final in Brussels.

In 2019, she competed in the senior women's race at the World Cross Country Championships held in March in Aarhus, Denmark, finishing in seventh place. In September, the 28-year-old triumphed in the 3000 m steeplechase at the Doha World Championships in Qatar with a time of 8:57.84, breaking the championship record in the process. Chepkoech won her second steeplechase Diamond Trophy that year, winning four of the five events, including final in Zürich.

In February 2021, she broke the 5 km road world record in a time of 14 minutes 43 seconds at the Monaco Run. The previous world record in a mixed gender race was set by Caroline Chepkoech Kipkirui in 2018 with 14:48. Chepkoech's time bettered also Sifan Hassan's women only record of 14:44 set in 2019. Chepkoech placed seventh in her signature event with a time of 9:16.33 at the postponed 2020 Tokyo Olympics in August.

She was forced to withdraw from the 2022 World Championship held in Eugene, Oregon in July due to an injury.

== Achievements ==
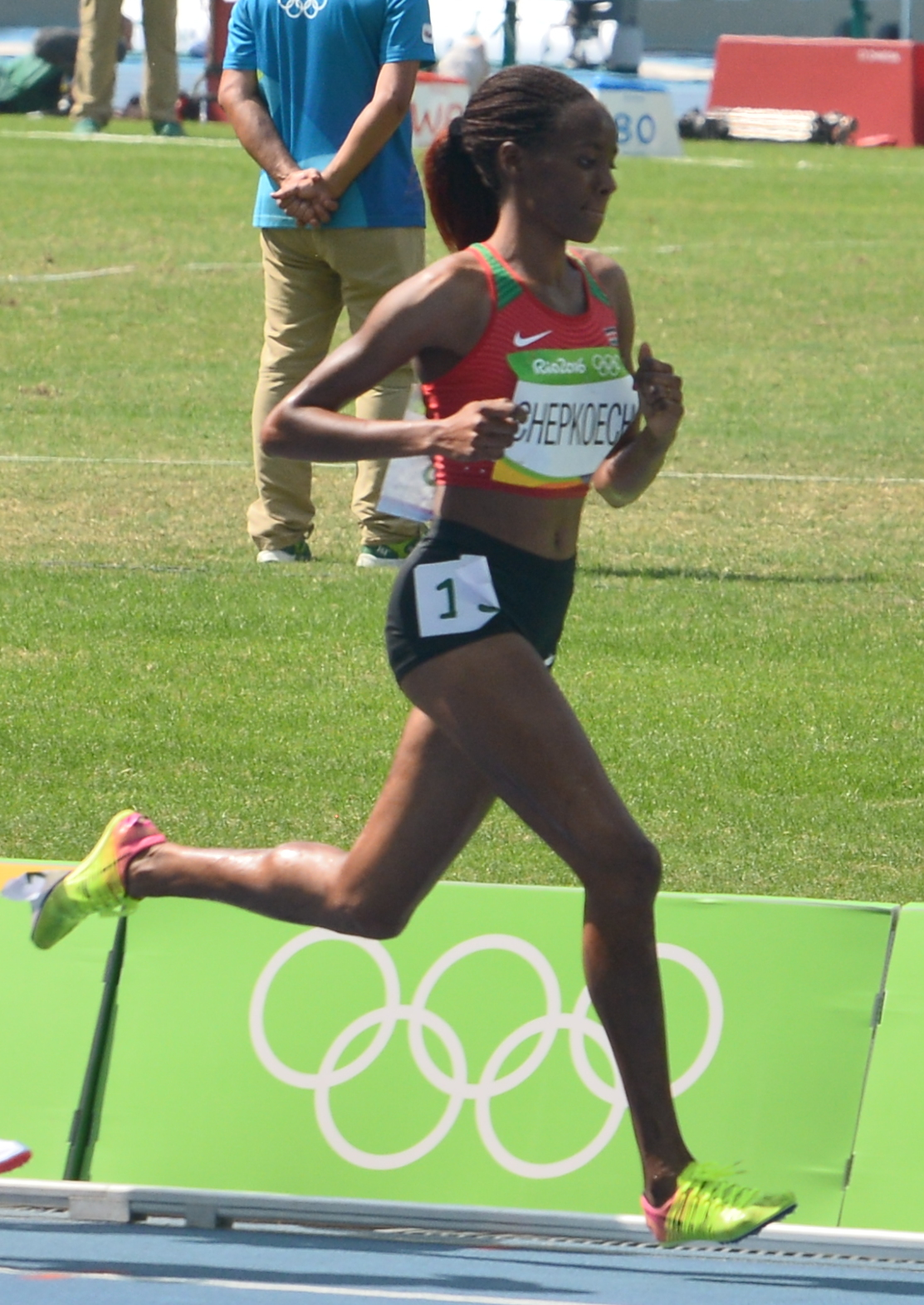
Chepkoech competes in her specialist event at the 2016 Rio Olympics, finishing fourth.

All information from World Athletics profile.

=== Personal bests ===
- 1500 metres – 3:59.73 (Los Angeles 2024)
- 3000 metres – 8:22.92 (Doha 2020)
- 2000 metres steeplechase – 6:02.47 (Berlin 2015)
- 3000 metres steeplechase – 8:44.32 (Monaco 2018) World record

Road

- 5 km – 14:43 (Monaco 2021)
- 10 km – 32:35 (Hem 2014)

=== International competitions ===
Representing Kenya
Year	Competition	Venue	Position	Event	Result
2015	African Games	Brazzaville, Republic of the Congo	3rd	1500 m	4:19.16
2016	Olympic Games	Rio de Janeiro, Brazil	4th	3000 m s'chase	9:16.05
2017	World Cross Country Championships	Kampala, Uganda	1st	Mixed relay	22:22
2017	World Championships	London, United Kingdom	4th	3000 m s'chase	9:10.45
2018	World Indoor Championship	Birmingham, United Kingdom	7th	1500 m	4:13.59
2018	Commonwealth Games	Gold Coast, Australia	2nd	1500 m	4:03.09
2018	African Championships	Asaba, Nigeria	1st	3000 m s'chase	8:59.88 CR
2018	Continental Cup	Ostrava, Czech Republic	1st	3000 m s'chase	9:07.92 CR
2019	World Cross Country Championships	Aarhus, Denmark	7th	Senior race	22:22
2019	World Cross Country Championships	Aarhus, Denmark	2nd	Senior team	25 pts
2019	World Championships	Doha, Qatar	1st	3000 m s'chase	8:57.84 CR
2021	Olympic Games	Tokyo, Japan	7th	3000 m s'chase	9:16.33
2023	World Championships	Budapest, Hungary	2nd	3000 m s'chase	8:58.98
2024	World Indoor Championships	Glasgow, United Kingdom	3rd	3000 m	8:22.68
2024	African Games	Accra, Ghana	4th	5000 m	15:13.71
2024	Olympic Games	Paris, France	6th	3000 m s'chase	9:04.24

=== Circuit wins and titles, National titles ===
- Diamond League champion 3000 m steeplechase (2): 2018, 2019
  - 2017 (1): Paris Meeting
  - 2018 (3): Paris (WL PB), Monaco Herculis (WR), Brussels Memorial Van Damme
  - 2019 (4): Shanghai Diamond League (WL MR), Prefontaine Classic in Stanford, CA (WL MR), Birmingham British Grand Prix (MR), Zürich Weltklasse
- Kenyan Athletics Championships
  - 1500 metres: 2017
  - 3000 metres steeplechase: 2018
