= Grenada at the 2025 World Athletics Championships =

- Flag of Grenada
- WA code: GRN

in Tokyo, Japan 13 September 2025 – 21 September 2025
- Competitors: 4 (3 men and 1 woman)
- Medals Ranked 27th: Gold 0 Silver 1 Bronze 0 Total 1

World Athletics Championships appearances
- 1983; 1987; 1991; 1993; 1995; 1997; 1999; 2001; 2003; 2005; 2007; 2009; 2011; 2013; 2015; 2017; 2019; 2022; 2023; 2025

Grenada competed at the 2025 World Athletics Championships in Tokyo, Japan, from 13 to 21 September 2025.

== Medallists ==
Medal	Athlete	Event	Date
Silver	Anderson Peters	Men's javelin throw	September 18

== Results ==
Grenada entered 4 athletes.

Key

- Q = Qualified for the next round
- q = Qualified for the next round as a fastest loser or, in field events, by position without achieving the qualifying target
- NR = National record
- PB = Personal best
- SB = Season best
- N/A = Round not applicable for the event

=== Men ===
Track and road events

Athlete	Event	Heat		Semi-final		Final	
Athlete	Event	Result	Rank	Result	Rank	Result	Rank
Kirani James	400 metres	44.66	3 Q	44.97	7	Did not advance	

Field events

Athlete	Event	Qualification		Final	
Athlete	Event	Distance	Position	Distance	Position
Anderson Peters	Javelin throw	89.53 SB	1 Q	87.38	2nd place, silver medalist(s)

Combined events – Decathlon

Athlete	Event	100 m	LJ	SP	HJ	400 m	110H	DT	PV	JT	1500 m	Final	Rank
Lindon Victor	Result	10.60	7.01	14.73	1.93	48.80	14.92	52.34	NM	DNS	—N/a	DNF	
Lindon Victor	Points	952	816	773	740	871	859	919		DNS	—N/a	DNF	

=== Women ===
Field events

Athlete	Event	Qualification		Final	
Athlete	Event	Distance	Position	Distance	Position
Kelsie Murrel-Ross	Shot put	16.19	35	Did not advance	
