= 2023 World Athletics Championships – World Team =

World Team at the 2023 World Championships
- Venue: National Athletics Centre, Budapest and road events
- Dates: 19—27 August
- Nations: 197
- Winning score: 277

The World Team trophy of the 2023 World Athletics Championships was awarded to the teams with the most points earned based on points won by the athletes in each event. The World Team Champions' title was awarded to United States, which accumulated a total of 277 points, and were crowned "World Team Champions". Jamaica (second team with 139 points) and Kenya (third with 112 points) also received trophies.

On 11 March 2022, World Athletics announced that, for the first time, the top three teams in the all-around points table would be awarded with team trophies. The all-around points table is a team ranking system used commonly in the sports of athletics which consists of assigning points to each athlete (usually the top eight finishers) based on their overall final placing, then aggregates the points of all athletes in a team to provide a final team standing.

At this World Athletics Championships, the top eight finalists in each event scored points for their nation, with 8 points going to the gold medalists down to one point for each 8th place finisher. Non-finishers and disqualified athletes received zero points.

== Placing table ==
Rank	Team	1st place, gold medalist(s)	2nd place, silver medalist(s)	3rd place, bronze medalist(s)	4	5	6	7	8	Pts
1st place, gold medalist(s)	United States (USA)	12	8	9	3	6	4	7	6	277
2nd place, silver medalist(s)	Jamaica (JAM)	3	5	4	5	5	0	4	3	139
3rd place, bronze medalist(s)	Kenya (KEN)	3	3	4	4	2	2	3	3	112
4	Great Britain & N.I. (GBR)	2	3	5	3	3	1	1	3	102
5	Ethiopia (ETH)	2	4	3	2	3	3	1	1	96
6	Canada (CAN)	4	2	0	3	0	2	1	1	70
7	Spain (ESP)	4	1	0	1	1	2	0	1	55
8	Italy (ITA)	1	2	1	1	1	2	3	2	51
8	Netherlands (NED)	2	1	2	1	1	2	0	1	51
8	Australia (AUS)	1	2	3	1	0	0	2	2	51
11	Japan (JPN)	1	0	1	0	2	3	2	2	37
12	Germany (GER)	0	0	0	1	4	2	3	3	36
13	Norway (NOR)	2	1	1	0	0	1	1	1	35
14	China (CHN)	0	0	2	1	1	3	1	1	33
15	Poland (POL)	0	2	0	1	1	2	0	2	31
16	France (FRA)	0	1	0	1	2	2	1	1	29
17	Cuba (CUB)	0	1	2	1	0	1	0	0	27
17	Sweden (SWE)	2	1	0	0	0	1	0	1	27
19	Ukraine (UKR)	1	1	0	0	2	0	0	0	23
19	Uganda (UGA)	2	0	0	0	1	0	1	1	23
21	India (IND)	1	0	0	0	2	1	0	0	19
22	Brazil (BRA)	0	0	1	1	1	0	0	3	18
23	Belgium (BEL)	0	0	0	0	3	1	1	0	17
24	Botswana (BOT)	0	1	1	0	0	1	0	0	16
25	Peru (PER)	0	1	0	1	0	1	0	0	15
25	Slovenia (SLO)	0	1	0	1	0	1	0	0	15
25	Finland (FIN)	0	0	1	0	1	1	1	0	15
28	Czech Republic (CZE)	0	0	2	0	0	0	1	0	14
28	New Zealand (NZL)	0	0	0	1	1	1	1	0	14
28	Ireland (IRL)	0	0	0	2	0	1	0	1	14
28	Greece (GRE)	1	0	1	0	0	0	0	0	14
28	Morocco (MAR)	1	0	1	0	0	0	0	0	14
33	Bahrain (BHR)	1	0	0	1	0	0	0	0	13
34	Ecuador (ECU)	0	1	0	0	0	1	1	0	12
34	Israel (ISR)	0	1	0	1	0	0	0	0	12
36	Hungary (HUN)	0	0	1	1	0	0	0	0	11
37	Estonia (EST)	0	0	0	1	0	1	1	0	10
37	Serbia (SRB)	1	0	0	0	0	0	1	0	10
37	Burkina Faso (BUR)	1	0	0	0	0	0	1	0	10
37	Dominican Republic (DOM)	1	0	0	0	0	0	1	0	10
37	Lithuania (LTU)	0	0	1	0	0	1	0	1	10
42	Saint Lucia (LCA)	0	0	0	1	1	0	0	0	9
42	Venezuela (VEN)	1	0	0	0	0	0	0	1	9
44	Bahamas (BAH)	0	0	0	1	0	1	0	0	8
44	Algeria (ALG)	0	0	0	0	2	0	0	0	8
44	Switzerland (SUI)	0	0	0	0	1	0	2	0	8
44	Romania (ROM)	0	0	1	0	0	0	1	0	8
44	Nigeria (NGR)	0	0	0	1	0	1	0	0	8
49	Philippines (PHI)	0	1	0	0	0	0	0	0	7
49	British Virgin Islands (IVB)	0	1	0	0	0	0	0	0	7
49	Puerto Rico (PUR)	0	1	0	0	0	0	0	0	7
49	Colombia (COL)	0	1	0	0	0	0	0	0	7
49	Pakistan (PAK)	0	1	0	0	0	0	0	0	7
54	Austria (AUT)	0	0	0	0	1	0	1	0	6
54	Portugal (POR)	0	0	0	1	0	0	0	1	6
54	Ivory Coast (CIV)	0	0	0	1	0	0	0	1	6
54	Qatar (QAT)	0	0	1	0	0	0	0	0	6
54	Croatia (CRO)	0	0	0	0	1	0	1	0	6
54	Grenada (GRN)	0	0	1	0	0	0	0	0	6
54	Barbados (BAR)	0	0	1	0	0	0	0	0	6
61	Guatemala (GUA)	0	0	0	1	0	0	0	0	5
61	Lesotho (LES)	0	0	0	1	0	0	0	0	5
61	Latvia (LAT)	0	0	0	1	0	0	0	0	5
61	Azerbaijan (AZE)	0	0	0	1	0	0	0	0	5
65	Mexico (MEX)	0	0	0	0	1	0	0	0	4
65	Dominica (DMA)	0	0	0	0	1	0	0	0	4
67	South Korea (KOR)	0	0	0	0	0	1	0	0	3
68	Burundi (BDI)	0	0	0	0	0	0	1	0	2
68	South Africa (RSA)	0	0	0	0	0	0	1	0	2
70	Eritrea (ERI)	0	0	0	0	0	0	0	1	1
70	Albania (ALB)	0	0	0	0	0	0	0	1	1

Source: 2023 World Athletics Championships Placing Table
