= Athletics at the 2022 Commonwealth Games – Men's discus throw =

Men's discus throw at the 2022 Commonwealth Games
- Venue: Alexander Stadium
- Dates: 2 August (qualification); 4 August (final)
- Competitors: 15 from 13 nations
- Winning distance: 67.26

Medalists
gold medal	Matthew Denny	Australia
silver medal	Lawrence Okoye	England
bronze medal	Traves Smikle	Jamaica

The men's discus throw at the 2022 Commonwealth Games, as part of the athletics programme, took place in the Alexander Stadium on 2 and 4 August 2022.

== Records ==
Prior to this competition, the existing world and Games records were as follows:

World record	Jürgen Schult (GDR)	74.08 m	Neubrandenburg, East Germany	6 June 1986
Commonwealth record	Fedrick Dacres (JAM)	70.78 m	Rabat, Morocco	16 June 2019
Games record	Fedrick Dacres (JAM)	68.20 m	Gold Coast, Australia	13 April 2018

== Schedule ==
The schedule was as follows:

Date	Time	Round
Tuesday 2 August 2022	11:34	Qualification
Thursday 4 August 2022	20:35	Final

All times are British Summer Time (UTC+1)

== Results ==
=== Qualification ===
Across two groups, those who threw ≥65.00 m (Q) or at least the 12 best performers (q) advanced to the final.

Rank	Group	Athlete	#1	#2	#3	Result	Notes
1	A	Traves Smikle (JAM)	63.52	64.90	–	64.90	q
2	B	Matthew Denny (AUS)	61.84	62.93	64.63	64.63	q
3	B	Lawrence Okoye (ENG)	x	62.14	63.79	63.79	q
4	A	Alex Rose (SAM)	63.20	62.56	x	63.20	q
5	A	Nicholas Percy (SCO)	59.48	60.68	59.10	60.68	q
6	B	Connor Bell (NZL)	53.77	53.65	59.47	59.47	q
7	B	Zane Duquemin (JEY)	58.87	x	x	58.87	q
8	B	Roje Stona (JAM)	x	58.35	x	58.35	q
9	B	Apostolos Parellis (CYP)	57.26	57.17	57.99	57.99	q
10	A	Irfan Shamsuddin (MAS)	x	52.75	57.93	57.93	q
11	A	Christoforos Genethli (CYP)	x	57.40	55.83	57.40	q
12	A	Josh Boateng (GRN)	x	56.51	x	56.51	q
13	A	Ryan Williams (NAM)	55.02	55.54	x	55.54	
14	B	Djimon Gumbs (IVB)	50.42	53.32	x	53.32	
15	A	De'bono Paraka (PNG)	x	x	48.19	48.19	

=== Final ===
The medals were determined in the final.

Rank	Name	#1	#2	#3	#4	#5	#6	Result	Notes
1st place, gold medalist(s)	Matthew Denny (AUS)	65.26	66.61	66.72	65.83	67.24	67.26	67.26	PB
2nd place, silver medalist(s)	Lawrence Okoye (ENG)	x	64.97	64.34	x	64.99	x	64.99	
3rd place, bronze medalist(s)	Traves Smikle (JAM)	57.12	60.08	61.72	64.58	62.39	61.71	64.58	
4	Alex Rose (SAM)	62.17	61.74	64.56	61.94	x	61.50	64.56	
5	Nicholas Percy (SCO)	61.98	63.53	60.65	61.67	59.25	x	63.53	
6	Roje Stona (JAM)	58.58	x	62.15	x	59.60	x	62.15	
7	Apostolos Parellis (CYP)	62.08	61.27	59.83	60.36	60.17	59.06	62.08	
8	Connor Bell (NZL)	59.44	58.88	60.23	x	x	58.84	60.23	
9	Irfan Shamsuddin (MAS)	58.91	59.53	56.96				59.53	
10	Josh Boateng (GRN)	x	49.82	57.98				57.98	
11	Zane Duquemin (JEY)	57.97	x	55.88				57.97	
12	Christoforos Genethli (CYP)	57.80	56.88	57.00				57.80	
