= Grenada at the 2022 Commonwealth Games =

- Flag of Grenada
- CG code: GRN
- CGA: Grenada Commonwealth Games Association
- Website: grenadaolympic.com

in Birmingham, England 28 July 2022 – 8 August 2022
- Competitors: 13 (12 men and 1 woman) in 4 sports
- Flag bearers: Kurt Felix; Tilly Collymore
- Medals Ranked =23rd: Gold 1 Silver 1 Bronze 0 Total 2

Commonwealth Games appearances (overview)
- 1970; 1974; 1978; 1982; 1986–1994; 1998; 2002; 2006; 2010; 2014; 2018; 2022; 2026; 2030

Grenada competed at the 2022 Commonwealth Games held in Birmingham, England from 28 July to 8 August 2022. It was Grenada's 11th appearance at the Commonwealth Games.

== Medalists ==
Medal	Name	Sport	Event	Date
Gold	Lindon Victor	Athletics	Men's decathlon	5 August
Silver	Anderson Peters	Athletics	Men's javelin throw	7 August

== Competitors ==
The following is the list of number of competitors participating at the Games per sport/discipline.

Sport	Men	Women	Total
Athletics	8	0	8
Boxing	2	0	2
Cycling	1	0	1
Swimming	1	1	2
Total	12	1	13

== Athletics ==
Men
Track and road events

Athlete	Event	Heat		Semifinal		Final	
Athlete	Event	Result	Rank	Result	Rank	Result	Rank
Troy Mason	200 m	21.96	5	did not advance			
Michael Francois	400 m	46.35	3 Q	47.45	7	did not advance	
Adain Peters	400 m	48.96	5	did not advance			
Nathan Hood	800 m	1:51.81	6	—N/a		did not advance	

Field events

Athlete	Event	Qualification		Final	
Athlete	Event	Distance	Rank	Distance	Rank
Josh Boateng	Discus throw	56.51	12 q	57.98	10
Anderson Peters	Javelin throw	—N/a		88.64	2nd place, silver medalist(s)

Combined events – Decathlon

Athlete	Event	100 m	LJ	SP	HJ	400 m	110H	DT	PV	JT	1500 m	Final	Rank
Kurt Felix	Result	11.01	7.33	14.53	2.00	49.67	15.06	45.59	4.30	60.78	4:58.41	7787	4
Kurt Felix	Points	858	893	761	803	830	842	779	702	750	569	7787	4
Lindon Victor	Result	10.76	7.46	15.48	2.03	49.51	14.89	46.54	4.70	65.16	4:51.60	8233	1st place, gold medalist(s)
Lindon Victor	Points	915	925	819	831	837	863	799	819	816	609	8233	1st place, gold medalist(s)

== Boxing ==
Men

Athlete	Event	Round of 32	Round of 16	Quarterfinals	Semifinals	Final	
Athlete	Event	Opposition Result	Opposition Result	Opposition Result	Opposition Result	Opposition Result	Rank
Kemrond Moses	Middleweight	Bye	Tui (TUV); W 5 - 0	Bongco (RSA); L 0 - 5	did not advance		
Andy Andall	Heavyweight	—N/a	Bye	P-Faoagali (SAM); L RSC	did not advance		

== Cycling ==
=== Road ===
Men

Athlete	Event	Time	Rank
Red Walters	Road race	3:37:08	21

=== Track ===
Points race

Athlete	Event	Final	
Athlete	Event	Points	Rank
Red Walters	Men's point race	DNF	

Scratch race

Athlete	Event	Qualification	Final
Red Walters	Men's scratch race	2 Q	DNF

== Swimming ==
Men

Athlete	Event	Heat		Semifinal		Final	
Athlete	Event	Time	Rank	Time	Rank	Time	Rank
Zackary Gersham	100 m freestyle	55.07	57	did not advance			
Zackary Gersham	50 m backstroke	28.09	34	did not advance			
Zackary Gersham	100 m backstroke	59.55	24	did not advance			
Zackary Gersham	200 m backstroke	2:14.29	19	—N/a		did not advance	
Zackary Gersham	100 m butterfly	57.80	36	did not advance			
Zackary Gersham	200 m individual medley	2:13.13	20	—N/a		did not advance	

Women

Athlete	Event	Heat		Semifinal		Final	
Athlete	Event	Time	Rank	Time	Rank	Time	Rank
Tilly Collymore	50 m freestyle	28.24	48	did not advance			
Tilly Collymore	100 m freestyle	1:02.68	48	did not advance			
Tilly Collymore	200 m freestyle	2:17.13	24	—N/a		did not advance	
Tilly Collymore	400 m freestyle	4:48.97	20	—N/a		did not advance	
Tilly Collymore	50 m backstroke	33.25	28	did not advance			
Tilly Collymore	100 m backstroke	1:13.41	27	did not advance			
Tilly Collymore	50 m butterfly	30.38	40	did not advance			
Tilly Collymore	100 m butterfly	1:12.23	35	did not advance			
