= Grenada at the 2011 World Championships in Athletics =

- WA code: GRN
- National federation: Grenada Athletic Association

in Daegu
- Competitors: 3
- Medals: Gold 1 Silver 0 Bronze 0 Total 1

World Championships in Athletics appearances
- 1983; 1987; 1991; 1993; 1995; 1997; 1999; 2001; 2003; 2005; 2007; 2009; 2011; 2013; 2015; 2017; 2019; 2022; 2023; 2025

Grenada competed at the 2011 World Championships in Athletics from August 27 to September 4 in Daegu, South Korea.

== Team selection ==
A team of 3 athletes was announced to represent the country in the event. The team is led by rising 400m sprint star Kirani James.

== Medalists ==
The following competitors from Grenada won medals at the Championships:

Medal	Athlete	Event
Gold	Kirani James	400 metres

== Results ==
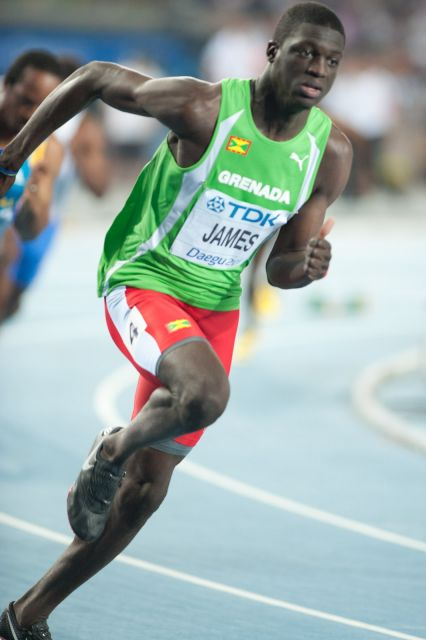
Kirani James

=== Men ===
Kirani James became the third youngest ever male gold medallist at a World Championship and also the first man from Grenada to climb the podium at this global event.

Athlete	Event	Preliminaries		Heats		Semifinals		Final	
Athlete	Event	Time Width Height	Rank	Time Width Height	Rank	Time Width Height	Rank	Time Width Height	Rank
Kirani James	400 metres			45.12	5 (Q)	45.20	6 (Q)	44.60	1st place, gold medalist(s)
Rondell Bartholomew	400 metres			44.82	3 (Q)	45.17	5 (q)	45.45	6

=== Women ===
Athlete	Event	Preliminaries		Heats		Semifinals		Final	
Athlete	Event	Time Width Height	Rank	Time Width Height	Rank	Time Width Height	Rank	Time Width Height	Rank
Janelle Redhead	200 metres			23.11	19	23.57	22	Did not advance	
