= Canada at the 2023 World Athletics Championships =

- Flag of Canada
- WA code: CAN

in Budapest, Hungary 19 August 2023 – 27 August 2023
- Competitors: 55 (26 men and 29 women)
- Medals Ranked 2nd: Gold 4 Silver 2 Bronze 0 Total 6

World Athletics Championships appearances (overview)
- 1976; 1980; 1983; 1987; 1991; 1993; 1995; 1997; 1999; 2001; 2003; 2005; 2007; 2009; 2011; 2013; 2015; 2017; 2019; 2022; 2023; 2025

Canada competed at the 2023 World Athletics Championships in Budapest, Hungary, from August 19–27, 2023. With four gold and two silver medals, the nation ranked second on the medal table, its best-ever result at the World Athletics Championships, though its total medal count (six) did not exceed the eight won at the 2015 edition.

== Medallists ==
Medal	Athlete	Event	Date
Gold	Ethan Katzberg	Men's hammer throw	August 20
Gold	Camryn Rogers	Women's hammer throw	August 24
Gold	Marco Arop	Men's 800m	August 26
Gold	Pierce LePage	Men's decathlon	August 26
Silver	Damian Warner	Men's decathlon	August 26
Silver	Sarah Mitton	Women's shot put	August 26

== Results ==
Canada entered 55 athletes.

Key

- Q = Qualified for the next round
- q = Qualified for the next round as a fastest loser or, in field events, by position without achieving the qualifying target
- NR = National record
- PB = Personal best
- SB = Season best
- N/A = Round not applicable for the event

=== Men ===
Track and road events

Athlete	Event	Heat		Semifinal		Final	
Athlete	Event	Result	Rank	Result	Rank	Result	Rank
Jerome Blake	100 metres	10.29	5	Did not advance			
Brendon Rodney	100 metres	10.16	4 q	10.25	7	Did not advance	
Aaron Brown	200 metres	20.08	2 Q	DQ		Did not advance	
Andre De Grasse	200 metres	20.28	2 Q	20.10	3 q	20.14	6
Brendon Rodney	200 metres	20.14 SB	1 Q	20.27	4	Did not advance	
Marco Arop	800 metres	1:45.05	1 Q	1:44.02	1 Q	1:44.24	1st place, gold medalist(s)
Abdullahi Hassan	800 metres	1:46.33	5	Did not advance			
Kieran Lumb	1500 metres	3:36.66	8	Did not advance			
Charles Philibert-Thiboutot	1500 metres	3:34.60	6 Q	3:37.41	10	Did not advance	
Mohammed Ahmed	5000 metres	13:33.16	3 Q	—N/a		13:12.92	7
Ben Flanagan	5000 metres	13:38.69	11	—N/a		Did not advance	
Mohammed Ahmed	10,000 metres	—N/a				27:56.43 SB	6
Justin Kent	Marathon	—N/a				2:15:26	30
Rory Linkletter	Marathon	—N/a				2:12:16 SB	19
Ben Preisner	Marathon	—N/a				2:15:02 SB	28
Jean-Simon Desgagnés	3000 metres steeplechase	8:20.04	2 Q	—N/a		8:15.58 PB	7
Evan Dunfee	20 kilometres walk	—N/a				1:18:03 NR	4
Evan Dunfee	35 kilometres walk	—N/a				2:25:28 SB	4
Aaron Brown; Jerome Blake; Brendon Rodney; Bolade Ajomale	4 × 100 metres relay	38.25	6	—N/a		Did not advance	

Field events

Athlete	Event	Qualification		Final	
Athlete	Event	Distance	Position	Distance	Position
Django Lovett	High jump	2.22 SB	27	Did not advance	
Mark Bujnowski	Shot put	18.84	33	Did not advance	
Rowan Hamilton	Hammer throw	74.14	13	Did not advance	
Ethan Katzberg	Hammer throw	81.18 NR	1 Q	81.25 NR	1st place, gold medalist(s)
Adam Keenan	Hammer throw	74.56	12 q	74.49	11

Combined events – Decathlon

Athlete	Event	100 m	LJ	SP	HJ	400 m	110H	DT	PV	JT	1500 m	Final	Rank
Pierce LePage	Result	10.45	7.59	15.81	2.08 SB	47.21 SB	13.77 PB	50.98	5.20	60.90	4:39.88 SB	8909 WL	1st place, gold medalist(s)
Pierce LePage	Points	987	957	840	878	948	1004	891	972	751	681	8909 WL	1st place, gold medalist(s)
Damian Warner	Result	10.32	7.77 SB	15.03	2.05 SB	47.86	13.67	45.82	4.90	63.09 SB	4:27.73	8804 SB	2nd place, silver medalist(s)
Damian Warner	Points	1018	1002	792 SB	850	916	1018	784	880	784	760	8804 SB	2nd place, silver medalist(s)

=== Women ===
Track and road events

Athlete	Event	Heat		Semifinal		Final	
Athlete	Event	Result	Rank	Result	Rank	Result	Rank
Khamica Bingham	100 metres	11.29	5	Did not advance			
Kyra Constantine	400 metres	52.28	6	Did not advance			
Grace Konrad	400 metres	51.60 PB	5	Did not advance			
Madeleine Kelly	800 metres	2:04.72	8	Did not advance			
Jazz Shukla	800 metres	2:00.30 PB	4 q	2:00.23 PB	7	Did not advance	
Kate Current	1500 metres	4:07.23 PB	9	Did not advance			
Simone Plourde	1500 metres	4:07.04	10	Did not advance			
Lucia Stafford	1500 metres	4:05.21	7	Did not advance			
Briana Scott	5000 metres	15:42.56	19	—N/a		Did not advance	
Julie-Ann Staehli	5000 metres	15:24.09	15	—N/a		Did not advance	
Erin Teschuk	5000 metres	15:56.54	18	—N/a		Did not advance	
Sasha Gollish	Marathon	—N/a				2:45:09 SB	61
Natasha Wodak	Marathon	—N/a				2:30:09 SB	15
Mariam Abdul-Rashid	100 metres hurdles	13.04	6	Did not advance			
Michelle Harrison	100 metres hurdles	12.88	6 q	13.05	8	Did not advance	
Brooke Overholt	400 metres hurdles	56.20	7	Did not advance			
Savannah Sutherland	400 metres hurdles	55.85	4 Q	54.99	6	Did not advance	
Ceili McCabe	3000 metres steeplechase	9:29.30	6	—N/a		Did not advance	
Regan Yee	3000 metres steeplechase	9:26.39	8	—N/a		Did not advance	
Kyra Constantine; Grace Konrad; Zoe Sherar; Aiyanna Stiverne	4 × 400 metres relay	3:23.29 SB	2 Q	—N/a		3:22.42 SB	4

Field events

Athlete	Event	Qualification		Final	
Athlete	Event	Distance	Position	Distance	Position
Anicka Newell	Pole vault	4.35	24	Did not advance	
Alysha Newman	Pole vault	4.50	18	Did not advance	
Sarah Mitton	Shot put	19.37	5 Q	20.08 SB	2nd place, silver medalist(s)
Grace Tennant	Shot put	NM		Did not advance	
Camryn Rogers	Hammer throw	73.95	4 Q	77.22	1st place, gold medalist(s)
Jillian Weir	Hammer throw	67.48	27	Did not advance	
