= Grenada at the 2009 World Championships in Athletics =

- WA code: GRN

in Berlin
- Competitors: 6 (3 men, 3 women)
- Medals: Gold 0 Silver 0 Bronze 0 Total 0

World Championships in Athletics appearances
- 1983; 1987; 1991; 1993; 1995; 1997; 1999; 2001; 2003; 2005; 2007; 2009; 2011; 2013; 2015; 2017; 2019; 2022; 2023

Grenada competed at the 2009 World Championships in Athletics from 15 to 23 August in Berlin.

== Team selection ==
A team of 6 athletes represented the country in the event.

== Medalists ==
None of the representatives earned a medal at this event.

== Results ==
=== Men ===
Athlete	Event	Preliminaries		Heats		Semifinals		Final	
Athlete	Event	Time Width Height	Rank	Time Width Height	Rank	Time Width Height	Rank	Time Width Height	Rank
Joel Redhead	200 metres			21.37	5	Did Not Advance	N/A	Did Not Advance	N/A
Rondell Bartholomew	400 metres			46.85	7	Did Not Advance	N/A	Did Not Advance	N/A
Randy Lewis	Triple Jump	16.73m|8th		N/A	N/A	Did Not Advance	N/A	Did Not Advance	N/A

=== Women ===
Athlete	Event	Preliminaries		Heats		Semifinals		Final	
Athlete	Event	Time Width Height	Rank	Time Width Height	Rank	Time Width Height	Rank	Time Width Height	Rank
Trish Bartholomew	400 metres			54.89	6	Did Not Advance	N/A	Did Not Advance	N/A
Neisha Bernard-Thomas	800 metres			2:04.55	5	Did Not Advance	N/A	Did Not Advance	N/A
Patricia Sylvester	Triple Jump	13.22m|18th		N/A	N/A	Did Not Advance	N/A	Did Not Advance	N/A
Patricia Sylvester	Long Jump	5.92m|18th		N/A	N/A	Did Not Advance	N/A	Did Not Advance	N/A
