= Cedric Dubler =

Australian decathlete

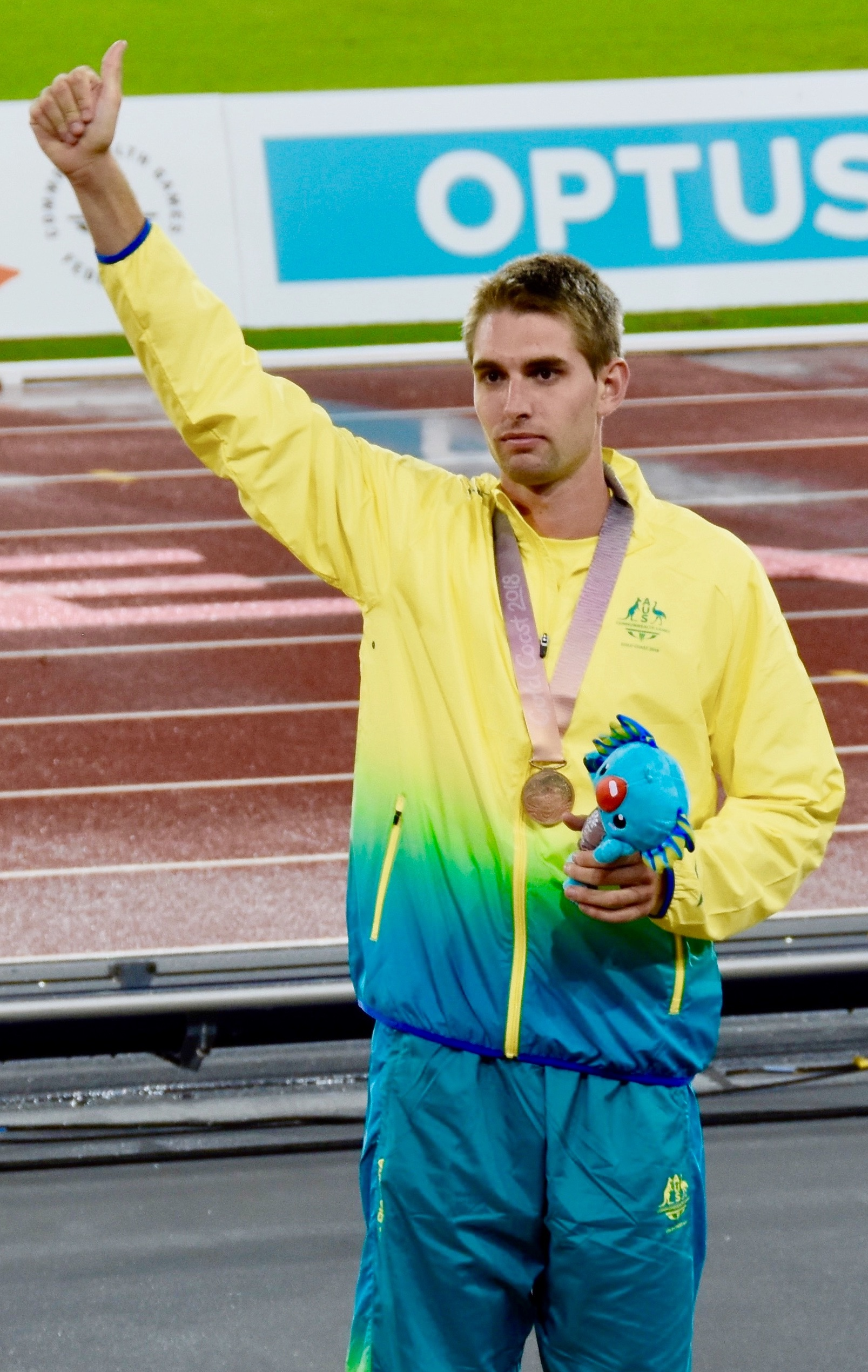

Personal information
- Born: 13 January 1995 (age 31) Brisbane, Australia
- Height: 189 cm (6 ft 2 in)
- Weight: 89 kg (196 lb)
- Website: Official Website

Sport
- Country: Australia
- Sport: Athletics
- Event: Decathlon
- Club: Tigers Athletics Club
- Coached by: Chris Gaviglio

Achievements and titles
- Personal best(s): Decathlon: 8393 (2022); Decathlon (Junior): 8094
Medal record
Commonwealth Games
Bronze medal – third place	2018 Gold Coast	Decathlon
Bronze medal – third place	2022 Birmingham	Decathlon
Oceania Area Championship
Silver medal – second place	2019 Townsville	Decathlon
World Junior Championships
Silver medal – second place	2014 Eugene	Decathlon

Cedric Dubler (born 13 January 1995) is an Australian decathlete.

== Early years ==
As a young boy, Dubler was good at basketball, volleyball, and soccer. At Little Athletics, he excelled at every type of event including 800m, long jump and sprints, and cross-country. Dubler joined coach Eric Brown who trained him on the pole vault and Brown soon realized that Dubler was a potential decathlete.

When only 17 years of age, Dubler placed fourth at the 2012 World U20 Championships. Two years later he won silver at the IAAF U20 World Junior Championships in Eugene, setting a former Oceania Junior Record of 8094 points. He was one of Australia's finest ever junior decathlete together with his training partner Ash Moloney.

== Achievements ==
In 2016, Dubler qualified for the Rio 2016 Olympics. Dubler competed as Australia's first decathlete in 16 years at the 2016 Summer Olympics in Rio de Janeiro, placing 14th. He was the first Australian since Sydney 2000 to compete at the Games and moved up to number three Australian all-time with a score of 8024, after qualifying with 8114 points.

In 2017, Dubler defended his national title and was placed 18th at the 2017 IAAF World Championships.

Dubler continued to make improvements in the 110m hurdles, discus, and pole vault, and at the National Championships and Commonwealth Games trials he achieved PBs in the 100m, shot, 110m hurdles, pole vault, javelin, and 1500m.

At the 2016 Summer Olympics, Dubler apologized after a cameraman was nearly struck during his second attempt of the javelin throw.

At the 2020 Tokyo Olympic Games, Dubler gained admiration for sacrificing his own final 1500m leg of the decathlon to act as a "pacer" and motivator for Ashley Moloney. Dubler's selflessness was acknowledged by many commentators as being instrumental in Moloney's bronze medal win, and was lauded by the Australian media as one of the most memorable moments of the Tokyo Olympics. On 30 April 2022, International Olympic Committee (IOC) President Thomas Bach presented Dubler with the inaugural Cecil Healy Award for Outstanding Sportsmanship displayed at an Olympic Games.

== Personal bests ==
As of 14 July 2025

Event	Performance	Location	Date
100 metres	10.79 (+0.2 m/s)	Brisbane	5 March 2022
200 metres	22.19 (+3.0 m/s)	Perth	14 January 2015
400 metres	49.58	Canberra	2 March 2024
110 metres hurdles	13.86 (+1.1 m/s)	Perth	13 January 2018
Long jump	7.71 m (25 ft 3 1/2 in) (+1.9 m/s)	Brisbane	27 February 2016
Long jump	7.90 m (25 ft 11 in) (+4.2 m/s)	Brisbane	14 March 2021
High Jump	2.01 m (6 ft 7 in)	Sydney	12 March 2022
Pole vault	5.10 m (16 ft 8 3/4 in)	Perth	20 January 2018
Shot put	13.29 m (43 ft 7 in)	Mackay	3 October 2020
Discus throw	46.01 m (150 ft 11 1/4 in)	Mackay	4 October 2020
Javelin throw	57.18 m (187 ft 7 in)	Brisbane	29 February 2020

Event	Performance	Location	Date	Points
Decathlon	—N/a	Sydney	1–2 April 2022	8,393 points
100 metres	10.63 sec (+1.7 m/s)	Gold Coast	16 February 2018	945 points
Long jump	7.84 m (25 ft 8 1/2 in) (+1.5 m/s)	Brisbane	16 December 2023	1,020 points
Long jump	7.92 m (25 ft 11 3/4 in) (+3.2 m/s)	Sydney	1 April 2022	—N/a
Shot put	13.35 m (43 ft 9 1/2 in)	Tokyo	4 August 2021	689 points
High Jump	2.15 m (7 ft 1/2 in)	Sydney	31 March 2016	944 points
400 metres	47.14	Sydney	1 April 2022	951 points
110 metres hurdles	14.05 (+1.2 m/s)	Townsville	26 June 2019	968 points
Discus throw	44.30 m (145 ft 4 in)	Doha	3 October 2019	752 points
Pole vault	5.20 m (17 ft 1/2 in)	Gold Coast	17 February 2018	972 points
Javelin throw	62.48 m (204 ft 11 3/4 in)	Brisbane	20 December 2020	775 points
1500 metres	4:29.69	Götzis	26 May 2019	747 points
Virtual Best Performance				8,763 points

== Major competition record ==
Year	Competition	Venue	Position	Event	Result
Representing Australia
2012	World Junior Championships	Barcelona, Spain	4th	Decathlon (Junior)	7584
2014	World Junior Championships	Eugene, USA	2nd	Decathlon (Junior)	8094
2016	Olympic Games	Rio de Janeiro, Brazil	14th	Decathlon	8024
2017	World Championships	London, United Kingdom	18th	Decathlon	7728
2018	Commonwealth Games	Gold Coast, Australia	3rd	Decathlon	7983
2019	Hypo-Meeting	Götzis, Austria	8th	Decathlon	8185
2019	Oceania Championships	Townsville, Australia	2nd	Decathlon	8031
2019	World Championships	Doha, Qatar	11th	Decathlon	8101
2021	Olympic Games	Tokyo, Japan	21st	Decathlon	7008
2022	World Championships	Eugene, USA	8th	Decathlon	8246
2022	Commonwealth Games	Birmingham, United Kingdom	3rd	Decathlon	8030
2023	Hypo-Meeting	Götzis, Austria	14th	Decathlon	8009
2023	World Championships	Budapest, Hungary	—	Decathlon	DNF

Records
Preceded by Jake Stein	Oceanian Junior Record for Decathlon; 23 July 2014 – 11 July 2018	Succeeded by Ashley Moloney
