= 2011 World Championships in Athletics – Men's 400 metres =

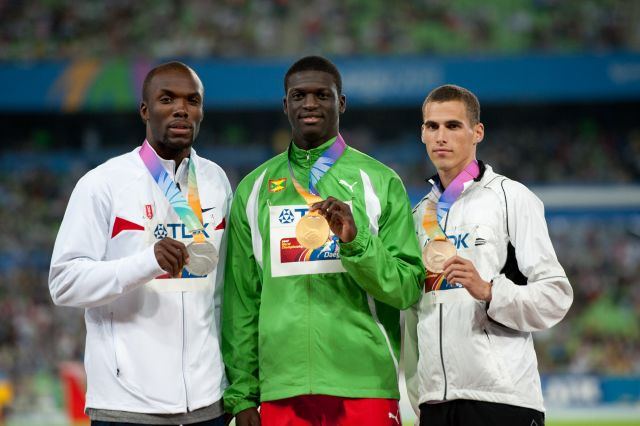
LaShawn Merritt, Kirani James, and Kévin Borlée.

Official Video

The men's 400 metres at the 2011 World Championships in Athletics was held at the Daegu Stadium on August 28, 29 and 30. The winning margin was 0.03 seconds.

Going into the Championships, defending champion LaShawn Merritt was serving a two-year ban. The ban was still in effect during the USA Outdoor Track and Field Championships, so Merritt was unable to compete. Ordinarily, since 1997, the defending champion is automatically invited to the championships, but the United States stipulates that the champion must compete in the national championships. It took a special decision by USATF to allow Merritt to enter. Merritt had minimal racing opportunities before the championships.

In qualifying, ordinarily athletes try to use the minimum effort to advance to the next round, but Merritt ran the year's world leading time of 44.35 in heat 3. The media focused on double amputee Oscar Pistorius, who ran 45.39 to qualify into the semi-finals.

In the semi-finals, Merritt ran a more controlled and relaxed 44.76 in semi 1, while Jermaine Gonzales controlled semi 3 in 44.99 and 18-year-old Kirani James ran an easy 45.20 to take semi 2. Rondell Bartholomew also qualified, placing two athletes from tiny Grenada in the final. Also twins Kévin and Jonathan Borlée placed two athletes from Belgium in the final. While his time from the trials would have made the final, Pistorius ran 46.19 in his semi and did not advance. Kirani James won the final beating LaShawn Merritt on the line with a time of 44.60. At 18 years, 363 days old, James became the youngest ever world medallist for the men's 400 m.

== Medalists ==
Gold	Silver	Bronze
Kirani James; Grenada	LaShawn Merritt; United States	Kévin Borlée; Belgium

== Records ==
Prior to the competition, the established records were as follows.

World record	Michael Johnson (USA)	43.18	Seville, Spain	26 August 1999
Championship record	Michael Johnson (USA)	43.18	Seville, Spain	26 August 1999
World Leading	Kirani James (GRN)	44.61	London, Great Britain	5 August 2011
African record	Gary Kikaya (COD)	44.10	Stuttgart, Germany	9 September 2006
Asian record	Mohamed Amer Al-Malky (OMA)	44.56	Budapest, Hungary	12 August 1988
North, Central American and Caribbean record	Michael Johnson (USA)	43.18	Seville, Spain	26 August 1999
South American record	Sanderlei Parrela (BRA)	44.29	Seville, Spain	26 August 1999
European record	Thomas Schönlebe (GDR)	44.33	Rome, Italy	3 September 1987
Oceanian record	Darren Clark (AUS)	44.38	Seoul, South Korea	26 September 1988

== Qualification standards ==
A time	B time
45.25	45.70

== Schedule ==
Date	Time	Round
August 28, 2011	11:15	Heats
August 29, 2011	20:00	Semifinals
August 30, 2011	21:45	Final

== Results ==
KEY:	q	Fastest non-qualifiers	Q	Qualified	NR	National record	PB	Personal best	SB	Seasonal best

=== Heats ===
Qualification: First 4 in each heat (Q) and the next 4 fastest (q) advance to the semifinals.

Rank	Heat	Name	Nationality	Time	Notes
1	3	LaShawn Merritt	United States	44.35	Q, WL
2	3	Kévin Borlée	Belgium	44.77	Q
3	1	Rondell Bartholomew	Grenada	44.82	Q
4	1	Renny Quow	Trinidad and Tobago	44.84	Q, SB
5	2	Jermaine Gonzales	Jamaica	45.12	Q
5	4	Kirani James	Grenada	45.12	Q
7	1	Greg Nixon	United States	45.16	Q
7	4	Jonathan Borlée	Belgium	45.16	Q
9	3	Rabah Yousif	Sudan	45.20	Q
10	1	Tabarie Henry	U.S. Virgin Islands	45.22	Q
11	5	Chris Brown	Bahamas	45.29	Q
12	5	Martyn Rooney	Great Britain & N.I.	45.30	Q, SB
13	4	Ramon Miller	Bahamas	45.31	Q, SB
14	5	Oscar Pistorius	South Africa	45.39	Q
15	5	Femi Seun Ogunode	Qatar	45.42	Q, SB
16	2	Jamaal Torrance	United States	45.44	Q
17	5	Nery Brenes	Costa Rica	45.47	q
18	2	Marcin Marciniszyn	Poland	45.51	Q
19	3	Yuzo Kanemaru	Japan	45.51	Q
20	2	Demetrius Pinder	Bahamas	45.53	Q
21	1	Riker Hylton	Jamaica	45.54	q
22	3	Pavel Trenikhin	Russia	45.55	q, PB
23	4	William Collazo	Cuba	45.89	Q
24	2	Erison Hurtault	Dominica	46.10	q
25	4	Park Bong-Go	South Korea	46.42	SB
26	5	Tony McQuay	United States	46.76	
27	4	Pako Seribe	Botswana	46.97	
28	1	Mathieu Gnanligo	Benin	47.01	
29	4	Augusto Stanley	Paraguay	47.31	
30	1	Nelson Stone	Papua New Guinea	47.86	
31	5	Ahmed Mohamed Al-Merjabi	Oman	47.99	
32	3	Arnold Sorina	Vanuatu	48.76	SB
33	4	Bahaa Al Farra	Palestine	49.04	PB
34	2	Nicolau Palanca	Angola	49.37	SB
35	1	Kerfalla Camara	Guinea	49.74	PB
36	2	Ak Hafiy Tajuddin Rositi	Brunei	50.12	
	5	Abdou Razack Rabo Samma	Niger	DSQ	
	3	Arismendy Peguero	Dominican Republic	DNS	
	3	Gary Kikaya	DR Congo	DNS	

=== Semifinals ===
Qualification: First 2 in each heat (Q) and the next 2 fastest (q) advance to the final.

Rank	Heat	Name	Nationality	Time	Notes
1	1	LaShawn Merritt	United States	44.76	Q
2	3	Jermaine Gonzales	Jamaica	44.99	Q
3	1	Kévin Borlée	Belgium	45.02	Q
4	3	Jonathan Borlée	Belgium	45.14	Q
5	3	Rondell Bartholomew	Grenada	45.17	q
6	2	Kirani James	Grenada	45.20	Q
7	3	Femi Seun Ogunode	Qatar	45.41	q, SB
8	1	Rabah Yousif	Sudan	45.43	
9	3	Greg Nixon	United States	45.51	
10	2	Tabarie Henry	U.S. Virgin Islands	45.53	Q
11	2	Chris Brown	Bahamas	45.54	
12	3	Pavel Trenikhin	Russia	45.68	
13	1	Renny Quow	Trinidad and Tobago	45.72	
14	2	Jamaal Torrance	United States	45.73	
15	3	Demetrius Pinder	Bahamas	45.87	
16	1	Ramon Miller	Bahamas	45.88	
17	2	Nery Brenes	Costa Rica	45.93	
18	2	Marcin Marciniszyn	Poland	45.94	
19	2	Martyn Rooney	Great Britain & N.I.	46.09	
20	1	Yuzo Kanemaru	Japan	46.11	
21	1	William Collazo	Cuba	46.13	
22	3	Oscar Pistorius	South Africa	46.19	
23	1	Erison Hurtault	Dominica	46.41	
24	2	Riker Hylton	Jamaica	46.99	

=== Final ===
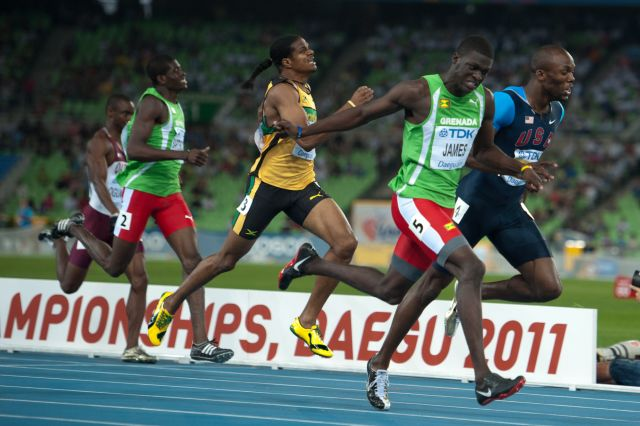
The finish.

Rank	Lane	Name	Nationality	Time	Notes
1st place, gold medalist(s)	5	Kirani James	Grenada	44.60	
2nd place, silver medalist(s)	4	LaShawn Merritt	United States	44.63	
3rd place, bronze medalist(s)	6	Kévin Borlée	Belgium	44.90	
4	3	Jermaine Gonzales	Jamaica	44.99	
5	8	Jonathan Borlée	Belgium	45.07	
6	2	Rondell Bartholomew	Grenada	45.45	
7	7	Tabarie Henry	U.S. Virgin Islands	45.55	
8	1	Femi Seun Ogunode	Qatar	45.55	
