= Harry Kendall (decathlete) =

English athlete

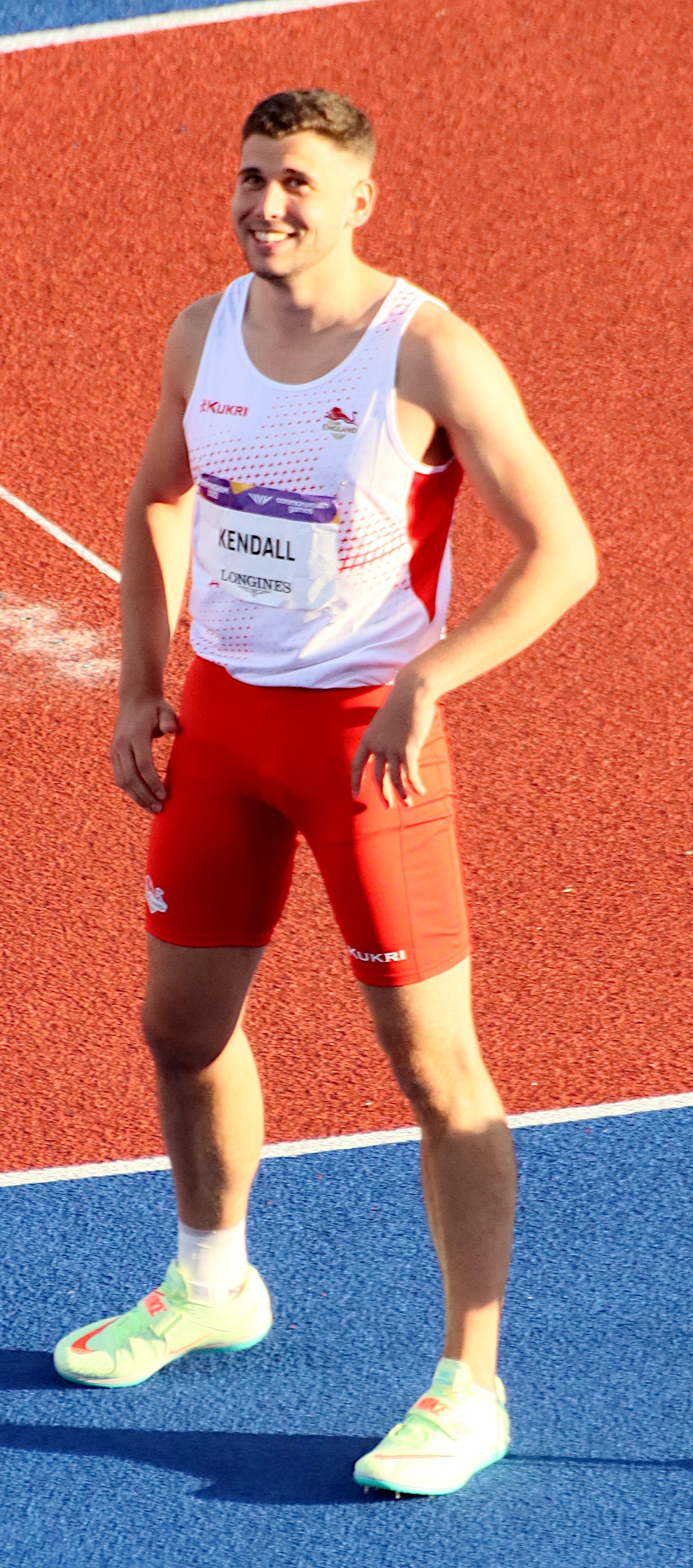
- Harry Kendall at the 2022 Commonwealth Games

Personal information
- Nationality: British (English)
- Born: 4 October 1996 (age 29) Tonbridge, Kent, England

Sport
- Sport: Athletics
- Event: Decathlon
- Club: Tonbridge AC

Harry Kendall (born 4 October 1996) is an English international athlete. He has represented England at the Commonwealth Games.

== Biography ==
In 2021, he won the bronze medal at the 2021 British Athletics Championships. In 2022, he won the English National Championship in Bedford after scoring a Championship record of 7843 points.

In 2022, he was selected for the men's decathlon event at the 2022 Commonwealth Games in Birmingham.
