= Athletics at the 2022 Commonwealth Games – Men's decathlon =

Men's decathlon at the 2022 Commonwealth Games
- Venue: Alexander Stadium
- Dates: 4 – 5 August
- Competitors: 8 from 5 nations
- Winning points: 8233

Medalists
gold medal	Lindon Victor	Grenada
silver medal	Daniel Golubovic	Australia
bronze medal	Cedric Dubler	Australia

The men's decathlon at the 2022 Commonwealth Games, as part of the athletics programme, took place in the Alexander Stadium on 4 and 5 August 2022.

== Records ==
Prior to this competition, the existing world and Games records were as follows:

World record	Kevin Mayer (FRA)	9126 points	Talence, France	16 September 2018
Commonwealth record	Damian Warner (CAN)	9018 pts	Tokyo, Japan	5 August 2021
Games record	Daley Thompson (ENG)	8663 points	Edinburgh, Scotland	28 July 1986

== Schedule ==
The schedule was as follows:

Date	Time	Round
Thursday 4 August 2022	10:15	100 metres
Thursday 4 August 2022	11:00	Long jump
Thursday 4 August 2022	12:20	Shot put
Thursday 4 August 2022	19:02	High jump
Thursday 4 August 2022	21:00	400 metres
Friday 5 2022	10:15	110 metres hurdles
Friday 5 2022	10:45	Discus throw
Friday 5 2022	12:26	Pole vault
Friday 5 2022	19:52	Javelin throw
Friday 5 2022	21:27	1500 metres

All times are British Summer Time (UTC+1)

== Results ==
Competitors contested a series of 10 events over two days, with their results being converted into points. The final standings were decided by their cumulative points tallies.

=== 100 metres ===
Results:

Rank	Lane	Athlete	Time	Points	Notes
1	3	Lindon Victor (GRN)	10.76	915	
2	4	Cedric Dubler (AUS)	10.92	878	
3	2	Karo Iga (PNG)	10.94	874	PB
4	1	Kurt Felix (GRN)	11.01	858	SB
5	8	Alec Diamond (AUS)	11.14	830	
6	7	Daniel Golubovic (AUS)	11.17	823	
7	5	Kendrick Thompson (BAH)	11.18	821	
8	6	Harry Kendall (ENG)	11.25	806	

=== Long jump ===
Results:

Rank	Athlete	#1	#2	#3	Mark	Points	Notes	Overall
1	Alec Diamond (AUS)	7.43	7.66	x	7.66	975		1805
2	Cedric Dubler (AUS)	7.46	7.61	7.53	7.61	962	SB	1840
3	Lindon Victor (GRN)	7.36	x	7.46	7.46	925	SB	1840
4	Kendrick Thompson (BAH)	7.03	6.97	7.43	7.43	918		1739
5	Kurt Felix (GRN)	x	5.54	7.33	7.33	893	SB	1751
6	Harry Kendall (ENG)	x	7.10	x	7.10	838		1644
7	Daniel Golubovic (AUS)	6.98	6.87	6.95	6.98	809		1632
8	Karo Iga (PNG)	x	6.95	6.49	6.95	802		1676

=== Shot put ===
Results:

Rank	Athlete	#1	#2	#3	Mark	Points	Notes	Overall
1	Daniel Golubovic (AUS)	15.60	14.94	14.60	15.60	827	PB	2459
2	Lindon Victor (GRN)	15.24	15.48	x	15.48	819		2659
3	Kurt Felix (GRN)	14.53	14.43	14.41	14.53	761	SB	2512
4	Alec Diamond (AUS)	x	13.90	14.23	14.23	742		2547
5	Harry Kendall (ENG)	12.70	13.04	13.62	13.62	705		2349
6	Cedric Dubler (AUS)	12.45	12.83	12.28	12.83	657		2497
7	Kendrick Thompson (BAH)	x	x	11.63	11.63	584		2323
8	Karo Iga (PNG)	10.55	10.91	11.05	11.05	549	PB	2225

=== High jump ===
Results:

Rank	Athlete	1.82	1.85	1.88	1.91	1.94	1.97	2.00	2.03	2.06	2.09	Mark	Points	Notes	Overall
1	Cedric Dubler (AUS)	–	–	–	–	–	o	xo	o	o	xxx	2.06	859		3356
2	Lindon Victor (GRN)	–	–	o	o	xo	o	xo	xxo	xxx		2.03	831	SB	3490
3	Kurt Felix (GRN)	–	o	–	o	–	xxo	xxo	xxx			2.00	803	SB	3315
4	Alec Diamond (AUS)	–	–	o	o	o	o	xxx				1.97	776	SB	3323
5	Daniel Golubovic (AUS)	–	o	o	xo	o	xxx					1.94	749		3208
6	Kendrick Thompson (BAH)	o	–	–	xo	xxo						1.94	749		3072
7	Karo Iga (PNG)	o	xo	xo	xo	xxx						1.91	723		2948
8	Harry Kendall (ENG)	o	o	xo	xxo	xxx						1.91	723		3072

=== 400 metres ===
Results:

Rank	Lane	Athlete	Time	Points	Notes	Overall
1	8	Cedric Dubler (AUS)	48.47	886		4242
2	6	Karo Iga (PNG)	48.61	880	PB	3828
3	4	Daniel Golubovic (AUS)	49.08	858	SB	4066
4	2	Harry Kendall (ENG)	49.20	852		3924
5	7	Lindon Victor (GRN)	49.51	837		4327
6	9	Kurt Felix (GRN)	49.67	830	SB	4145
7	3	Alec Diamond (AUS)	50.07	811		4134
8	5	Kendrick Thompson (BAH)	50.07	811		3883

=== 110 metres hurdles ===
Results:

Rank	Lane	Athlete	Time	Points	Notes	Overall
1	3	Cedric Dubler (AUS)	14.20	949		5191
2	5	Daniel Golubovic (AUS)	14.32	934		5000
3	4	Kendrick Thompson (BAH)	14.72	884		4767
4	7	Alec Diamond (AUS)	14.86	867		5001
5	1	Lindon Victor (GRN)	14.89	863		5190
6	6	Kurt Felix (GRN)	15.06	842	SB	4987
7	8	Harry Kendall (ENG)	15.72	765		4689
8	2	Karo Iga (PNG)	16.73	653	SB	4481

=== Discus throw ===
Results

Rank	Athlete	#1	#2	#3	Mark	Points	Notes	Overall
1	Daniel Golubovic (AUS)	47.26	49.85	44.63	49.85	867	SB	5867
2	Lindon Victor (GRN)	44.63	46.54	x	46.54	799		5989
3	Kurt Felix (GRN)	45.59	x	x	45.59	779		5766
4	Alec Diamond (AUS)	44.05	43.01	x	44.05	747		5748
5	Cedric Dubler (AUS)	39.72	42.51	44.01	44.01	746	SB	5937
6	Harry Kendall (ENG)	40.65	x	42.09	42.09	707		5396
7	Kendrick Thompson (BAH)	35.64	x	38.35	38.35	631		5398
8	Karo Iga (PNG)	28.35	31.88	x	31.88	502	PB	4983

=== Pole vault ===
Results

Rank	Athlete	3.50	3.60	3.70	3.80	3.90	4.00	4.10	4.20	4.30	4.40	4.50	4.60	4.70	4.80	4.90	5.00	5.10	Mark	Points	Notes	Overall
1	Cedric Dubler (AUS)	–	–	–	–	–	–	–	–	–	–	–	o	–	o	xxo	o	xxx	5.00	910		6847
2	Daniel Golubovic (AUS)	–	–	–	–	–	–	–	–	–	o	o	o	o	xo	xo	xxx		4.90	880	SB	6747
3	Alec Diamond (AUS)	–	–	–	–	–	–	–	–	–	o	o	o	xo	o	xxx			4.80	849	=PB	6597
4	Lindon Victor (GRN)	–	–	–	–	–	–	–	–	–	xo	o	o	o	xxx				4.70	819		6808
5	Harry Kendall (ENG)	–	–	–	–	–	o	o	o	xxo	xxo	xxx							4.40	731	PB	6127
6	Kurt Felix (GRN)	–	–	–	–	–	xxo	–	–	xxo	xxx								4.30	702	SB	6468
7	Kendrick Thompson (BAH)	–	–	–	–	–	–	–	xo	xx–	x								4.20	673		6071
8	Karo Iga (PNG)	xo	–	o	–	xo	xxx												3.90	590	SB	5573

=== Javelin throw ===
Results

Rank	Athlete	#1	#2	#3	Mark	Points	Notes	Overall
1	Lindon Victor (GRN)	64.04	65.16	64.60	65.16	816		7624
2	Kurt Felix (GRN)	58.08	–	60.78	60.78	750	SB	7218
3	Harry Kendall (ENG)	56.41	59.90	57.07	59.90	736	PB	6863
4	Daniel Golubovic (AUS)	54.36	56.44	58.26	58.26	712	SB	7459
5	Cedric Dubler (AUS)	51.84	45.74	51.24	51.84	616		7463
6	Karo Iga (PNG)	51.30	49.23	46.06	51.30	608	PB	6181
7	Kendrick Thompson (BAH)	50.66	r		50.66	598		6669
8	Alec Diamond (AUS)	38.90	42.29	42.22	42.29	475		7072

=== 1500 metres ===
Results

Rank	Athlete	Time	Points	Notes	Overall
1	Daniel Golubovic (AUS)	4:30.95	738		8197
2	Harry Kendall (ENG)	4:50.22	617		7480
3	Alec Diamond (AUS)	4:50.22	617		7689
4	Lindon Victor (GRN)	4:51.60	609		8233
5	Karo Iga (PNG)	4:56.54	580	SB	6761
6	Kurt Felix (GRN)	4:58.41	569	SB	7787
7	Cedric Dubler (AUS)	4:58.81	567		8030
	Kendrick Thompson (BAH)	Did not start			

== Standings ==
Rank	Athlete	Points	Notes
1st place, gold medalist(s)	Lindon Victor (GRN)	8233	
2nd place, silver medalist(s)	Daniel Golubovic (AUS)	8197	SB
3rd place, bronze medalist(s)	Cedric Dubler (AUS)	8030	
4	Kurt Felix (GRN)	7787	SB
5	Alec Diamond (AUS)	7689	
6	Harry Kendall (ENG)	7480	
7	Karo Iga (PNG)	6761	PB
	Kendrick Thompson (BAH)	DNF	
