= Trinidad and Tobago at the 2023 World Athletics Championships =

- Flag of Trinidad and Tobago
- WA code: TTO
- National federation: National Association of Athletics Administrations of Trinidad & Tobago
- Website: ttnaaa.org

in Budapest, Hungary 19 August 2023 – 27 August 2023
- Competitors: 16 (11 men and 5 women) in 6 events
- Medals: Gold 0 Silver 0 Bronze 0 Total 0

World Athletics Championships appearances
- 1983; 1987; 1991; 1993; 1995; 1997; 1999; 2001; 2003; 2005; 2007; 2009; 2011; 2013; 2015; 2017; 2019; 2022; 2023

Trinidad and Tobago competed at the 2023 World Athletics Championships in Budapest, Hungary, from 19 to 27 August 2023.

== Results ==
Key

- Q = Qualified for the next round
- q = Qualified for the next round as a fastest loser or, in field events, by position without achieving the qualifying target
- NR = National record
- PB = Personal best
- SB = Season best
- NM = No mark
- N/A = Round not applicable for the event

=== Men ===
==== Track and road events ====
Athlete	Event	Heat		Semifinal		Final	
Athlete	Event	Result	Rank	Result	Rank	Result	Rank
Jereem Richards	400 metres	45.15	3 Q	44.76	4	Did not advance	
Devin Augustine; Jerod Elcock; Omari Lewis; Revell Webster	4 × 100 metres relay	38.89	5	—		Did not advance	
Asa Guevara; Shakeem McKay; Renny Quow; Jereem Richards	4 × 400 metres relay	3:01.54 SB	7	—		Did not advance	

==== Field events ====
Athlete	Event	Qualification		Final	
Athlete	Event	Distance	Position	Distance	Position
Keshorn Walcott	Javelin throw	DNS		Did not advance	

=== Women ===
==== Track and road events ====
Athlete	Event	Heat		Semifinal		Final	
Athlete	Event	Result	Rank	Result	Rank	Result	Rank
Michelle-Lee Ahye	100 metres	11.16 SB	2 Q	11.18	=5	Did not advance	
Leah Bertrand	100 metres	11.32	6	Did not advance			
Michelle-Lee Ahye; Leah Bertrand; Akilah Lewis; Reyare Thomas	4 × 100 metres relay	42.85 SB	5	—		Did not advance	
