= Grenada at the 2022 World Athletics Championships =

- Flag of Grenada
- WA code: GRN

in Eugene, United States 15 July 2022 – 24 July 2022
- Competitors: 3 (3 men)
- Medals Ranked 13th: Gold 1 Silver 1 Bronze 0 Total 2

World Athletics Championships appearances
- 1983; 1987; 1991; 1993; 1995; 1997; 1999; 2001; 2003; 2005; 2007; 2009; 2011; 2013; 2015; 2017; 2019; 2022; 2023; 2025

Grenada compete at the 2022 World Athletics Championships in Eugene, United States, from 15 to 24 July 2022.

== Medalists ==
Medal	Athlete	Event	Date
Gold	Anderson Peters	Men's javelin throw	July 23
Silver	Kirani James	Men's 400 metres	July 22

== Results ==
Grenada has entered 3 athletes.

Key

- Q = Qualified for the next round
- q = Qualified for the next round as a fastest loser or, in field events, by position without achieving the qualifying target
- NR = National record
- PB = Personal best
- SB = Season best
- N/A = Round not applicable for the event

=== Men ===
Track and road events

Athlete	Event	Heat		Semi-final		Final	
Athlete	Event	Result	Rank	Result	Rank	Result	Rank
Kirani James	400 metres	45.29	3 Q	44.74	4 Q	44.48	2nd place, silver medalist(s)

Field events

Athlete	Event	Qualification		Final	
Athlete	Event	Distance	Position	Distance	Position
Anderson Peters	Javelin throw	89.91	1 Q	90.54	1st place, gold medalist(s)

Combined events – Decathlon

Athlete	Event	100 m	LJ	SP	HJ	400 m	110H	DT	PV	JT	1500 m	Final	Rank
Lindon Victor	Result	10.78 (+0.8)	7.26	16.29 SB	2.02	49.27	14.76	53.92	4.80 SB	66.20 SB	4:47.22 SB	8474 SB	5
Lindon Victor	Points	910	876	869	822	849	879	952	849	832	636	8474 SB	5
