= 2023 World Athletics Championships – Men's decathlon =

Men's decathlon at the 2023 World Championships
- Venue: National Athletics Centre
- Dates: 25–26 August
- Competitors: 24 from 14 nations
- Winning points: 8909

Medalists
gold medal	Pierce LePage	Canada
silver medal	Damian Warner	Canada
bronze medal	Lindon Victor	Grenada

The men's decathlon at the 2023 World Athletics Championships was held at the National Athletics Centre in Budapest on 25 and 26 August 2023.

== Records ==
Before the competition records were as follows:

Record	Athlete & Nat.	Perf.	Location	Date
World record	Kevin Mayer (FRA)	9126 pts	Talence, France	16 September 2018
Championship record	Ashton Eaton (USA)	9045 pts	Beijing, China	29 August 2015
World Leading	Leo Neugebauer (GER)	8836 pts	Austin, United States	8 June 2023
African Record	Larbi Bourrada (ALG)	8521 pts	Rio de Janeiro, Brazil	18 August 2016
Asian Record	Dmitriy Karpov (KAZ)	8725 pts	Athens, Greece	24 August 2004
North, Central American and Caribbean record	Ashton Eaton (USA)	9045 pts	Beijing, China	29 August 2015
South American Record	Carlos Chinin (BRA)	8393 pts	São Paulo, Brazil	8 June 2013
European Record	Kevin Mayer (FRA)	9126 pts	Talence, France	16 September 2018
Oceanian record	Ashley Moloney (AUS)	8649 pts	Tokyo, Japan	5 August 2021

For the current records in each discipline see Decathlon bests.

== Qualification standard ==
The standard to qualify automatically for entry was 8350 points.

== Schedule ==
The event schedule, in local time (UTC+2), was as follows:

Date	Time	Round
25 August	10:05	100 metres
25 August	10:55	Long jump
25 August	12:20	Shot put
25 August	18:30	High jump
25 August	21:08	400 metres
26 August	10:05	110 metres hurdles
26 August	11:00	Discus throw
26 August	13:00	Pole vault
26 August	19:05	Javelin throw
26 August	21:25	1500 metres

== Results ==
=== 100 metres ===
The 100 metres event was started on 25 August at 10:05.

Heat	1	2	3
Start time	10:05	10:12	10:19
Wind (m/s)	-0.1	+0.1	-0.3

Rank	Heat	Name	Nationality	Time	Points	Notes
1	3	Damian Warner	Canada	10.32	1018	
2	3	Ayden Owens-Delerme	Puerto Rico	10.43	992	
3	3	Manuel Eitel	Germany	10.44	989	
4	3	Pierce LePage	Canada	10.45	987	
5	3	Zachery Ziemek	United States	10.58	956	SB
6	3	Kyle Garland	United States	10.59	954	
7	3	Lindon Victor	Grenada	10.60	952	SB
8	3	Ashley Moloney	Australia	10.60	952	
9	2	Rik Taam	Netherlands	10.64	942	SB
10	1	Leo Neugebauer	Germany	10.69	931	
11	2	Johannes Erm	Estonia	10.69	931	PB
12	2	Harrison Williams	United States	10.74	919	
13	2	José Fernando Ferreira	Brazil	10.77	912	
14	1	Kevin Mayer	France	10.79	908	
15	2	Cedric Dubler	Australia	10.82	901	
16	2	Karel Tilga	Estonia	10.84	897	PB
17	2	Markus Rooth	Norway	10.84	897	
18	1	Sander Skotheim	Norway	10.89	885	
19	2	Yuma Maruyama	Japan	10.90	883	SB
20	1	Janek Õiglane	Estonia	10.94	874	SB
21	1	Larbi Bourrada	Algeria	11.01	858	SB
22	1	Daniel Golubovic	Australia	11.10	838	
23	1	Niklas Kaul	Germany	11.20	817	SB
24	1	Marcus Nilsson	Sweden	11.43	677	

=== Long jump ===
The long jump event was started on 25 August at 11:00.

Rank	Group	Name	Nationality	Round			Result	Points	Notes	Overall	
Rank	Group	Name	Nationality	1	2	3	Result	Points	Notes	Pts	Rank
1	A	Leo Neugebauer	Germany	7.83	x	8.00	8.00	1061	PB	1992	2
2	A	Sander Skotheim	Norway	7.80	x	x	7.80	1010	PB	1895	9
3	A	Damian Warner	Canada	7.62	x	7.77	7.77	1002	SB	2020	1
4	A	Johannes Erm	Estonia	7.61	7.72	7.60	7.72	990	SB	1921	6
5	A	Ayden Owens-Delerme	Puerto Rico	7.45	7.44	7.72	7.72	990		1982	3
6	B	Markus Rooth	Norway	7.53	7.62	7.55	7.62	965	PB	1862	10
7	A	Zachery Ziemek	United States	7.50	7.48	7.62	7.62	965	SB	1921	5
8	A	Pierce LePage	Canada	7.53	7.43	7.59	7.59	957		1944	4
9	A	Karel Tilga	Estonia	x	7.58	7.41	7.58	955		1852	11
10	B	Lindon Victor	Grenada	7.12	7.55	7.40	7.55	947	SB	1899	8
11	A	Kyle Garland	United States	7.48	x	7.54	7.54	945		1899	7
12	A	Harrison Williams	United States	6.98	7.49	7.17	7.49	932		1851	12
13	B	Janek Õiglane	Estonia	7.26	7.47	x	7.47	927	PB	1801	15
14	A	Cedric Dubler	Australia	7.40	-	-	7.40	910		1811	14
15	B	Kevin Mayer	France	7.14	x	7.25	7.25	874		1782	17
16	B	Niklas Kaul	Germany	7.16	7.01	5.34	7.16	852		1669	23
17	B	Manuel Eitel	Germany	7.03	7.14	7.10	7.14	847		1836	13
18	B	Rik Taam	Netherlands	x	7.11	x	7.11	840		1782	16
19	B	Larbi Bourrada	Algeria	6.85	7.09	6.99	7.09	835		1693	21
20	B	Daniel Golubovic	Australia	x	7.09	x	7.09	835		1673	22
21	B	Yuma Maruyama	Japan	6.91	x	7.00	7.00	814		1697	20
22	B	Marcus Nilsson	Sweden	x	x	7.00	7.00	814	SB	1581	24
23	A	Ashley Moloney	Australia	6.91	x	6.98	6.98	809		1761	18
24	B	José Fernando Ferreira	Brazil	6.92	6.80	6.92	6.92	695		1707	19

=== Shot put ===
The shot put event was started on 25 August at 12:20.

Rank	Group	Name	Nationality	Round			Result	Points	Notes	Overall	
Rank	Group	Name	Nationality	1	2	3	Result	Points	Notes	Pts	Rank
1	A	Leo Neugebauer	Germany	17.04	x	-	17.04	916	PB	2908	1
2	A	Lindon Victor	Grenada	15.61	x	15.94	15.94	848		2747	4
3	A	Pierce LePage	Canada	15.75	15.81	x	15.81	840		2784	3
4	A	Karel Tilga	Estonia	15.75	x	x	15.75	836		2688	8
5	A	Zachery Ziemek	United States	13.96	14.90	15.39	15.39	814		2735	5
6	B	Johannes Erm	Estonia	15.04	15.38	15.31	15.38	813	PB	2734	6
7	A	Harrison Williams	United States	14.61	15.28	15.03	15.28	807		2658	9
8	B	Daniel Golubovic	Australia	15.14	14.79	14.51	15.14	798	SB	2471	17
9	B	Janek Õiglane	Estonia	15.08	x	x	15.08	795	SB	2596	12
10	B	Damian Warner	Canada	15.03	x	x	15.03	792	SB	2812	2
11	B	Rik Taam	Netherlands	14.89	14.75	x	14.89	783	PB	2565	14
12	B	Niklas Kaul	Germany	14.67	14.77	14.85	14.85	780	SB	2449	19
13	A	Manuel Eitel	Germany	14.85	14.45	x	14.85	780		2616	11
14	A	Marcus Nilsson	Sweden	14.49	x	14.26	14.49	758		2339	22
15	A	Kyle Garland	United States	x	13.96	14.44	14.44	755		2654	10
16	A	Ayden Owens-Delerme	Puerto Rico	14.21	14.20	14.30	14.30	747		2729	7
17	B	Ashley Moloney	Australia	13.63	14.08	14.02	14.08	733		2494	16
18	B	Yuma Maruyama	Japan	13.40	x	x	13.40	692		2389	20
19	B	Sander Skotheim	Norway	13.35	x	x	13.35	689		2584	13
20	A	Markus Rooth	Norway	12.84	x	13.22	13.22	681		2543	15
21	B	José Fernando Ferreira	Brazil	12.39	12.84	12.90	12.90	661		2368	21
22	B	Cedric Dubler	Australia	12.64	12.68	12.20	12.68	648	SB	2459	18
23	B	Larbi Bourrada	Algeria	12.27	x	12.44	12.44	633	SB	2326	23
—	A	Kevin Mayer	France					DNS		DNF	

=== High jump ===
The high jump event was started on 25 August at 18:35.

Rnk	Grp	Athlete	Nationality	1.75	1.78	1.81	1.84	1.87	1.90	1.93	1.96	1.99	2.02	2.05	2.08	2.11	2.14	Res	Pts	Nts	Overall	
Rnk	Grp	Athlete	Nationality	1.75	1.78	1.81	1.84	1.87	1.90	1.93	1.96	1.99	2.02	2.05	2.08	2.11	2.14	Res	Pts	Nts	Pts	Rnk
1	A	Sander Skotheim	Norway	–	–	–	–	–	–	–	–	o	–	o	xo	xo	xxx	2.11	906		3490	8
2	A	Kyle Garland	United States	–	–	–	–	–	–	o	–	o	o	o	o	xxx		2.08	878		3532	6
3	A	Pierce LePage	Canada	–	–	–	–	–	–	–	–	xo	–	o	xo	xxr		2.08	878	SB	3662	2
4	A	Karel Tilga	Estonia	–	–	–	–	–	–	o	o	o	o	o	xxx			2.05	850		3538	5
5	B	Damian Warner	Canada	–	–	–	–	–	–	o	o	o	xxo	o	xxx			2.05	850	SB	3662	3
6	A	Markus Rooth	Norway	–	–	–	–	–	o	o	o	o	o	xxx				2.02	822		3365	14
6	A	Niklas Kaul	Germany	–	–	–	–	–	–	–	o	o	o	r				2.02	822		3271	15
8	B	Janek Õiglane	Estonia	–	–	–	–	o	–	xo	o	o	o	xxx				2.02	822	SB	3418	11
9	B	Lindon Victor	Grenada	–	–	–	–	–	o	–	xo	o	xo	xxx				2.02	822	SB	3569	4
10	A	Leo Neugebauer	Germany	–	–	–	–	o	o	xo	o	xo	xo	xxx				2.02	822		3730	1
11	A	Cedric Dubler	Australia	–	–	–	–	–	–	–	–	o	xxx					1.99	794		3253	16
11	A	Zachery Ziemek	United States	–	–	–	–	–	–	–	–	o	–	xxx				1.99	794		3529	7
13	A	Manuel Eitel	Germany	–	–	–	–	o	o	o	o	xo	xxx					1.99	794		3410	12
14	B	Yuma Maruyama	Japan	–	–	–	o	o	o	o	xo	xxx						1.96	767		3156	19
15	A	Johannes Erm	Estonia	–	–	–	o	–	o	o	xxx							1.93	740		3474	9
16	B	Daniel Golubovic	Australia	–	–	–	xo	o	o	o	xxx							1.93	740		3211	18
16	B	José Fernando Ferreira	Brazil	–	–	o	xo	o	o	o	xxx							1.93	740		3108	20
18	B	Harrison Williams	United States	–	–	–	–	xo	xo	o	xxx							1.93	740		3398	13
19	B	Marcus Nilsson	Sweden	–	–	–	o	o	xxo	xxo	xxx							1.93	740		3079	21
20	A	Ayden Owens-Delerme	Puerto Rico	–	–	–	o	xo	xo	xxx								1.90	714		3443	10
21	B	Rik Taam	Netherlands	–	–	xo	o	xxx										1.84	661		3226	17
—	B	Ashley Moloney	Australia																DNS		DNF	
—	B	Kevin Mayer	France																DNS		DNF	
—	B	Larbi Bourrada	Algeria																DNS		DNF	

=== 400 metres ===
The 400 metres event was started on 25 August at 21:08.

Rank	Heat	Athlete	Nationality	Result	Points	Notes	Overall	
Rank	Heat	Athlete	Nationality	Result	Points	Notes	Pts	Rank
1	3	Ayden Owens-Delerme	Puerto Rico	46.44	986	SB	4429	6
2	3	Harrison Williams	United States	46.52	982		4380	9
3	3	Johannes Erm	Estonia	47.05	956		4430	5
4	3	Rik Taam	Netherlands	47.12	952	PB	4178	14
5	2	Pierce LePage	Canada	47.21	952	SB	4620	2
6	3	Damian Warner	Canada	47.86	916		4578	3
7	3	Leo Neugebauer	Germany	47.99	910		4640	1
8	2	Lindon Victor	Grenada	48.05	907	PB	4476	4
9	1	Markus Rooth	Norway	48.27	896	PB	4261	13
10	1	Janek Õiglane	Estonia	48.41	889	PB	4307	11
11	2	Manuel Eitel	Germany	48.47	886		4296	12
12	3	Sander Skotheim	Norway	48.48	886		4376	10
13	2	Karel Tilga	Estonia	48.58	881		4419	7
14	2	Kyle Garland	United States	49.24	850		4382	8
15	1	José Fernando Ferreira	Brazil	49.31	847		3955	16
16	2	Daniel Golubovic	Australia	49.87	821		4032	15
17	1	Yuma Maruyama	Japan	50.75	780		3936	17
18	1	Marcus Nilsson	Sweden	51.36	780	SB	3832	18
	1	Kevin Mayer	France	DNS	0		DNF	
	1	Zachery Ziemek	United States	DNS	0		DNF	
	1	Larbi Bourrada	Algeria	DNS	0		DNF	
	2	Cedric Dubler	Australia	DNS	0		DNF	
	2	Niklas Kaul	Germany	DNS	0		DNF	
	3	Ashley Moloney	Australia	DNS	0		DNF	

=== 110 metres hurdles ===
The 110 metres hurdles event was started on 26 August at 10:05.

Rank	Heat	Athlete	Nationality	Result	Points	Notes	Overall	
Rank	Heat	Athlete	Nationality	Result	Points	Notes	Pts	Rank
1	3	Damian Warner	Canada	13.67	1018		5596	2
2	3	Pierce LePage	Canada	13.77	1004	PB	5614	1
3	3	Kyle Garland	United States	13.93	984		5366	6
4	2	José Fernando Ferreira	Brazil	13.94	982	PB	4937	16
5	3	Ayden Owens-Delerme	Puerto Rico	14.04	969		5398	4
6	2	Daniel Golubovic	Australia	14.18 [0.173]	951		4983	15
6	2	Yuma Maruyama	Japan	14.18 [0.173]	951	SB	4887	17
8	3	Harrison Williams	United States	14.33	932		5312	7
9	2	Manuel Eitel	Germany	14.39	925		5221	11
10	2	Markus Rooth	Norway	14.47 [0.462]	915		5176	13
11	1	Lindon Victor	Grenada	14.47 [0.469]	915	SB	5391	5
12	1	Janek Õiglane	Estonia	14.51	910		5217	12
13	1	Karel Tilga	Estonia	14.68	889		5308	8
14	2	Leo Neugebauer	Germany	14.75	880		5520	3
15	1	Rik Taam	Netherlands	14.80	874		5052	14
16	1	Johannes Erm	Estonia	14.90	862	SB	5292	9
17	3	Sander Skotheim	Norway	14.96	854		5230	10
18	1	Marcus Nilsson	Sweden	15.06	842	SB	4674	18

=== Discus throw ===
The discus throw hurdles event was started on 26 August at 11:02.

Rank	Group	Name	Nationality	Round			Result	Points	Notes	Overall	
Rank	Group	Name	Nationality	1	2	3	Result	Points	Notes	Pts	Rank
1	B	Lindon Victor	Grenada	51.48	54.64	54.97	54.97	974	CDB	6365	3
2	A	Pierce LePage	Canada	50.98	x	47.23	50.98	891		6505	1
3	B	Karel Tilga	Estonia	50.57	50.44	47.98	50.57	882		6190	5
4	A	Markus Rooth	Norway	48.78	44.06	44.47	48.78	845	SB	6021	10
5	A	Daniel Golubovic	Australia	47.97	48.47	47.87	48.47	839	SB	5822	14
6	A	Leo Neugebauer	Germany	45.26	x	47.63	47.63	821		6341	4
7	B	Damian Warner	Canada	45.20	45.82	45.01	45.82	784		6380	2
8	B	Johannes Erm	Estonia	45.09	44.44	43.82	45.09	769		6061	8
9	A	Marcus Nilsson	Sweden	42.87	45.03	45.04	45.04	768		5442	17
10	B	Ayden Owens-Delerme	Puerto Rico	40.61	44.17	x	44.17	750		6148	6
11	A	Harrison Williams	United States	43.07	x	43.39	43.39	734		6046	9
12	A	Kyle Garland	United States	42.37	43.07	x	43.07	727		6093	7
13	A	Rik Taam	Netherlands	42.77	41.40	43.04	43.04	727		5779	15
14	B	José Fernando Ferreira	Brazil	41.93	41.56	42.60	42.60	718		5655	16
15	B	Yuma Maruyama	Japan	40.05	41.56	40.67	41.56	696	SB	5583	18
16	B	Manuel Eitel	Germany	36.86	x	41.30	41.30	691		5912	11
17	A	Janek Õiglane	Estonia	40.85	39.27	40.48	40.85	682	SB	5899	12
18	A	Sander Skotheim	Norway	38.99	32.18	39.07	39.07	646		5876	13

=== Pole vault ===
The pole vault event was started on 26 August at 12:48.

Rnk	Grp	Athlete	Nationality	4.00	4.10	4.20	4.30	4.40	4.50	4.60	4.70	4.80	4.90	5.00	5.10	5.20	5.30	5.40	Res	Pts	Nts	Overall	
Rnk	Grp	Athlete	Nationality	4.00	4.10	4.20	4.30	4.40	4.50	4.60	4.70	4.80	4.90	5.00	5.10	5.20	5.30	5.40	Res	Pts	Nts	Pts	Rnk
1	A	Harrison Williams	United States	–	–	–	–	–	–	–	–	–	o	–	o	o	xxo	xxx	5.30	1004		7050	5
2	A	Pierce LePage	Canada	–	–	–	–	–	–	–	–	o	–	o	o	o	xxx		5.20	972		7477	1
3	A	Janek Õiglane	Estonia	–	–	–	–	–	–	–	o	–	o	o	o	xxx			5.10	941		6840	9
4	A	Markus Rooth	Norway	–	–	–	–	–	–	–	–	o	o	xxo	o	xxx			5.10	941		6962	7
5	A	Leo Neugebauer	Germany	–	–	–	–	–	–	o	xo	o	o	xo	xo	xxx			5.10	941		7282	2
6	B	Johannes Erm	Estonia	–	–	–	–	–	o	–	o	xo	xo	xxx					4.90	880		6941	8
7	B	Damian Warner	Canada	–	–	–	–	–	o	xxo	o	o	xo	xxx					4.90	880		7260	3
8	A	Sander Skotheim	Norway	–	–	–	–	–	–	–	–	o	–	xxx					4.80	849		6725	11
9	A	Daniel Golubovic	Australia	–	–	–	–	–	o	o	xo	o	xxx						4.80	849		6671	12
10	B	Karel Tilga	Estonia	–	–	–	–	–	o	o	o	xo	xxx						4.80	849		7039	6
11	B	Lindon Victor	Grenada	–	–	–	–	o	o	xo	o	xo	xxx						4.80	849		7214	4
12	B	José Fernando Ferreira	Brazil	–	–	–	–	–	o	o	xo	xxo	xxx						4.80	849		6504	14
13	B	Manuel Eitel	Germany	–	–	–	–	–	–	o	o	xxx							4.70	819		6731	10
14	A	Rik Taam	Netherlands	–	–	–	–	–	–	–	xo	xxx							4.70	819		6598	13
15	B	Yuma Maruyama	Japan	–	–	–	–	o	o	o	xxx								4.60	790		6373	15
	B	Ayden Owens-Delerme	Puerto Rico	–	–	–	–	xxx											NM			DNF	
	A	Kyle Garland	United States	–	–	–	–	–	xxx										NM			DNF	
	A	Marcus Nilsson	Sweden	–	–	–	–	–	–	–	–	xxx							NM			DNF	

=== Javelin throw ===
The javelin throw event was started on 26 August at 19:05.

Rank	Group	Name	Nationality	Round			Result	Points	Notes	Overall	
Rank	Group	Name	Nationality	1	2	3	Result	Points	Notes	Pts	Rank
1	A	Janek Õiglane	Estonia	70.45	66.71	69.86	70.45	896	SB	7736	7
2	A	José Fernando Ferreira	Brazil	69.19	63.54	65.60	69.19	877		7381	13
3	B	Lindon Victor	Grenada	61.50	66.16	68.05	68.05	860	SB	8074	2
4	B	Karel Tilga	Estonia	66.00	x	66.42	66.42	835	SB	7874	5
5	B	Markus Rooth	Norway	64.84	60.02	60.05	64.84	811		7773	6
6	B	Damian Warner	Canada	61.14	63.09	55.81	63.09	784	SB	8044	3
7	B	Pierce LePage	Canada	58.12	55.58	60.90	60.90	751		8228	1
8	B	Johannes Erm	Estonia	60.56	57.45	55.83	60.56	746	PB	7687	9
9	A	Yuma Maruyama	Japan	55.16	60.14	55.48	60.14	740	SB	7113	15
10	A	Manuel Eitel	Germany	59.44	60.12	x	60.12	740		7471	10
11	A	Sander Skotheim	Norway	54.67	55.35	59.05	59.05	724		7449	11
12	A	Daniel Golubovic	Australia	58.95	57.34	57.10	58.95	722	SB	7393	12
13	A	Rik Taam	Netherlands	53.77	53.86	57.96	57.96	707		7305	14
14	B	Leo Neugebauer	Germany	57.95	54.98	53.83	57.95	707	PB	7989	4
15	B	Harrison Williams	United States	48.03	54.60	50.82	54.60	657		7707	8
	A	Ayden Owens-Delerme	Puerto Rico					DNS		DNF	
	A	Marcus Nilsson	Sweden					DNS		DNF	

=== 1500 metres ===
The 1500 metres event was started on 26 August at 21:25.

Rank	Athlete	Nationality	Result	Points	Notes	Overall	
Rank	Athlete	Nationality	Result	Points	Notes	Pts	Rank
1	Sander Skotheim	Norway	4:19.64	814		8263	10
2	Karel Tilga	Estonia	4:20.73	807	PB	8681	4
3	Johannes Erm	Estonia	4:22.19	797	PB	8484	9
4	Harrison Williams	United States	4:22.69	793	PB	8500	7
5	Rik Taam	Netherlands	4:22.70	793		8098	13
6	Janek Õiglane	Estonia	4:23.43	788	PB	8524	6
7	Damian Warner	Canada	4:27.73	760		8804	2
8	Daniel Golubovic	Australia	4:29.51	748	SB	8141	12
9	Yuma Maruyama	Japan	4:32.01	731	PB	7844	15
10	Manuel Eitel	Germany	4:33.70	720	PB	8191	11
11	Markus Rooth	Norway	4:34.11	718		8491	8
12	Lindon Victor	Grenada	4:39.67	682	PB	8756	3
13	Pierce LePage	Canada	4:39.88	681	SB	8909	1
14	Leo Neugebauer	Germany	4:43.93	656	SB	8645	5
15	José Fernando Ferreira	Brazil	5:00.91	554		7935	14

=== Final standings ===
The final standings were as follows:

The highest mark recorded in each event is highlighted in yellow

Rank	Athlete	Nationality	100m	LJ	SP	HJ	400m	110mh	DT	PV	JT	1500m	Total	Notes
1st place, gold medalist(s)	Pierce LePage	Canada	10.45	7.59	15.81	2.08	47.21	13.77	50.98	5.20	60.90	4:39.88	8909	WL
2nd place, silver medalist(s)	Damian Warner	Canada	10.32	7.77	15.03	2.05	47.86	13.67	45.82	4.90	63.09	4:27.73	8804	SB
3rd place, bronze medalist(s)	Lindon Victor	Grenada	10.60	7.55	15.94	2.02	48.05	14.47	54.97	4.80	68.05	4:39.67	8756	NR
4	Karel Tilga	Estonia	10.84	7.58	15.75	2.05	48.58	14.68	50.57	4.80	66.42	4:20.73	8681	PB
5	Leo Neugebauer	Germany	10.69	8.00	17.04	2.02	47.99	14.75	47.63	5.10	57.95	4:43.93	8645	
6	Janek Õiglane	Estonia	10.94	7.47	15.08	2.02	48.41	14.51	40.85	5.10	70.45	4:23.43	8524	PB
7	Harrison Williams	United States	10.74	7.49	15.28	1.93	46.52	14.33	43.39	5.30	54.60	4:22.69	8500	
8	Markus Rooth	Norway	10.84	7.62	13.22	2.02	48.27	14.47	48.78	5.10	64.84	4:34.11	8491	
9	Johannes Erm	Estonia	10.69	7.72	15.38	1.93	47.05	14.90	45.09	4.90	60.56	4:22.19	8484	PB
10	Sander Skotheim	Norway	10.89	7.80	13.35	2.11	48.48	14.96	39.07	4.80	59.05	4:19.64	8263	
11	Manuel Eitel	Germany	10.44	7.14	14.85	1.99	48.47	14.39	41.30	4.70	60.12	4:33.70	8191	
12	Daniel Golubovic	Australia	11.10	7.09	15.14	1.93	49.87	14.18	48.47	4.80	58.95	4:29.51	8141	
13	Rik Taam	Netherlands	10.64	7.11	14.89	1.84	47.12	14.80	43.04	4.70	57.96	4:22.70	8098	
14	José Fernando Ferreira	Brazil	10.77	6.92	12.90	1.93	49.31	13.94	42.60	4.80	69.19	5:00.91	7935	
15	Yuma Maruyama	Japan	10.90	7.00	13.40	1.96	50.75	14.18	14.56	4.60	60.14	4:32.01	7844	PB
	Ayden Owens-Delerme	Puerto Rico	10.43	7.72	14.30	1.90	46.44	14.04	44.17	NM	DNS		DNF	
	Kyle Garland	United States	10.59	7.54	14.44	2.08	49.24	13.93	43.07	NM	DNS		DNF	
	Marcus Nilsson	Sweden	11.43	7.00	14.49	1.93	51.36	15.06	45.04	NM	DNS		DNF	
	Zachery Ziemek	United States	10.58	7.62	15.39	1.99	DNS						DNF	
	Niklas Kaul	Germany	11.20	7.16	14.85	2.02	DNS						DNF	
	Cedric Dubler	Australia	10.82	7.40	12.68	1.99	DNS						DNF	
	Ashley Moloney	Australia	10.60	6.98	14.08	DNS							DNF	
	Larbi Bourrada	Algeria	11.01	7.09	12.44	DNS							DNF	
	Kevin Mayer	France	10.79	7.25	DNS								DNF	
