= Daniel Golubovic =

Australian decathlete (born 1993)

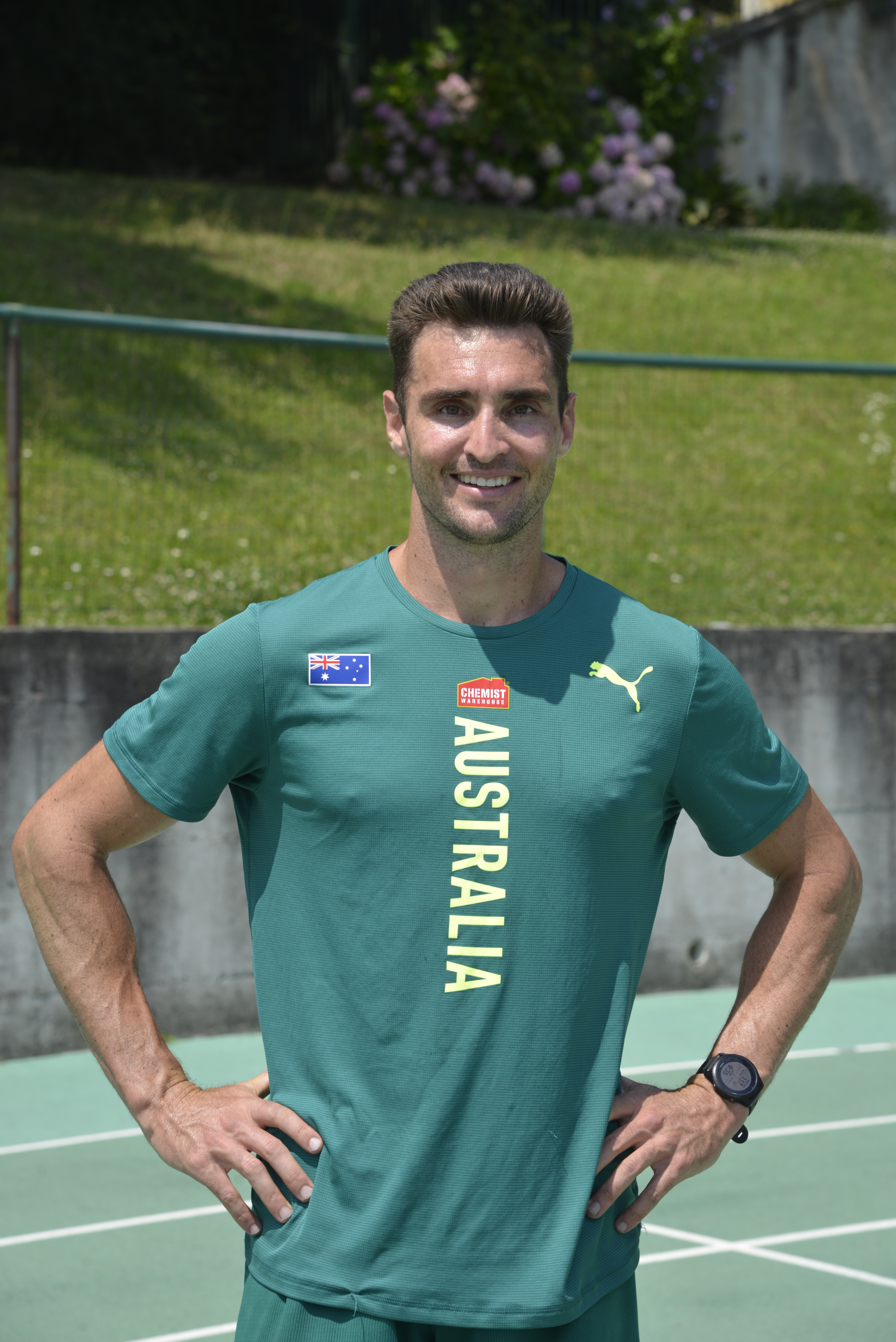
- Daniel Golubovic in 2024

Personal information
- Born: 29 November 1993 (age 32) Torrance, California, United States
- Home town: Manhattan Beach, California, United States
- Height: 194 cm (6 ft 4 in)
- Weight: 200 lb (91 kg)

Sport
- Country: United States; Australia
- Sport: Track and field
- Event(s): Decathlon; Combined events
- College team: Duke Blue Devils; UCSD Tritons

Achievements and titles
- Personal bests: Outdoor; Decathlon: 8336 pts; 100 m: 10.91; 400 m: 48.58; 110 mH: 13.92; HJ: 2.00 m (6 ft 6 1/2 in); Indoor; Heptathlon: 5433 pts
Medal record
Men's athletics
Representing Australia
Athletics at the Commonwealth Games
Silver medal – second place	2022 Birmingham	Decathlon
Oceania Athletics Championships
Silver medal – second place	2024 Suva	Decathlon

Daniel Gordon Golubovic (born 29 November 1993) is an Australian decathlete. Golubovic won silver medal at 2022 Commonwealth Games.

== Career ==
Golubovic is a 2012 graduate of Mira Costa High School, 2016 alum of University of California, San Diego and 2017 MBA graduate of Fuqua School of Business at Duke University. In 2020, Golubovic was approved to represent Athletics Australia in international competition.

Golubovic's Team USA experiences were highlighted by 2018 U.S. Track & Field Championships, 4th (decathlon) & 2017 NCAA Division I Championships, 11th (decathlon). Golubovic placed 12th at 2014 NCAA Division II Men's Outdoor Track and Field Championships and won decathlon at 2014 California Collegiate Athletic Association championships. He won 2016 San Diego State Aztecs decathlon with 7139 points (UCSD Tritons school record) and later placed All-American 6th at 2016 NCAA Division II Men's Outdoor Track and Field Championships with 7116 points.

== NCAA career ==
Golubovic's National Collegiate Athletic Association championship experiences include 2017 NCAA Division I Championships, 11th (decathlon). Golubovic placed 12th at 2014 NCAA Division II Men's Outdoor Track and Field Championships and won decathlon at 2014 California Collegiate Athletic Association championships. He won 2016 San Diego State Aztecs decathlon with 7139 points (UCSD Tritons school record) and later placed All-American 6th at 2016 NCAA Division II Men's Outdoor Track and Field Championships with 7116 points.

== Competition record ==
Golubovic won silver medal at 2022 commonwealth games.

Year	Competition	Venue	Position	Event	Notes
Representing Australia
2021	Oceania Open Combined Events Championships	Brisbane, Australia	1st	Decathlon	8336 pts
2022	World Championships	Eugene, United States	14th	Decathlon	8071 pts
2022	Commonwealth Games	Birmingham, United Kingdom	2nd	Decathlon	8197 pts
2023	World Championships	Budapest, Hungary	12th	Decathlon	8141 pts
2024	Olympic Games	Paris, France	19th	Decathlon	7566 pts
