= Athletics at the 2023 Pan American Games – Women's 400 metres =

Women's 400 metres at the 2023 Pan American Games
- Venue: Julio Martínez National Stadium
- Dates: October 30 – November 1
- Competitors: 10 from 8 nations
- Winning time: 51.48

Medalists
Gold medal	Martina Weil	Chile
Silver medal	Nicole Caicedo	Ecuador
Bronze medal	Evelis Aguilar	Colombia

The women's 400 metres competition of the athletics events at the 2023 Pan American Games was held on October 30 and November 1 at the Julio Martínez National Stadium of Santiago, Chile.

== Records ==
Prior to this competition, the existing world and Pan American Games records were as follows:

World record	Marita Koch (GER)	47.60	Canberra, Australia	October 6, 1985
Pan American Games record	Ana Quirot (CUB)	49.61	Havana, Cuba	August 6, 1991

== Schedule ==
Date	Time	Round
October 30, 2023	17:50	Semifinal
November 1, 2023	20:23	Final

== Results ==
All times shown are in seconds.

KEY:	q	Fastest non-qualifiers	Q	Qualified	NR	National record	PB	Personal best	SB	Seasonal best	DQ	Disqualified

=== Semifinal ===
Qualification: First 2 in each heat (Q) and next 2 fastest (q) qualified for the final. The results were as follows:

Rank	Heat	Name	Nationality	Time	Notes
1	1	Martina Weil	Chile	51.47	Q
2	1	Aliyah Abrams	Guyana	51.82	Q
3	1	Nicole Caicedo	Ecuador	52.32	Q
4	1	Madeline Price	Canada	52.70	q
5	1	Tiffani Marinho	Brazil	52.83	q, PB
6	2	Evelis Aguilar	Colombia	53.11	Q
7	2	Grace Konrad	Canada	53.64	Q
8	2	Tábata Vitorino	Brazil	55.57	Q
	2	Anabel Medina	Dominican Republic	DQ	TR 16.8
	2	Roxana Gómez	Cuba	DNS	

=== Final ===
The results were as follows:

Rank	Lane	Name	Nationality	Time	Notes
1st place, gold medalist(s)	6	Martina Weil	Chile	51.48	
2nd place, silver medalist(s)	8	Nicole Caicedo	Ecuador	51.76	
3rd place, bronze medalist(s)	5	Evelis Aguilar	Colombia	51.95	
4	7	Grace Konrad	Canada	52.10	
5	4	Aliyah Abrams	Guyana	52.66	
6	2	Tiffani Marinho	Brazil	52.81	PB
7	3	Madeline Price	Canada	53.59	
	1	Tábata Vitorino	Brazil	DNS	
