= 2023 World Athletics Championships – Men's 400 metres =

Men's 400 metres at the 2023 World Championships
- Venue: National Athletics Centre
- Dates: 20 August (heats); 22 August (semi-finals); 24 August (final)
- Competitors: 48 from 36 nations
- Winning time: 44.22

Medalists
gold medal	Antonio Watson	Jamaica
silver medal	Matthew Hudson-Smith	Great Britain
bronze medal	Quincy Hall	United States

The men's 400 metres at the 2023 World Athletics Championships was held at the National Athletics Centre in Budapest, Hungary from 20 to 24 August 2023. The winning margin was 0.09 seconds.

== Summary ==
The defending champion, Michael Norman, was unable to return due to injury, opening up the field. In the semi-finals, Antonio Watson ran his personal best of 44.13 to lead the field and pulling veteran Vernon Norwood to his personal best of 44.26 in the first semi. This relegated World Record holder, making a heroic return from what should have been a career-ending injury, Wayde van Niekerk to have to wait in the holding room to await his fate. In the second semi, Matthew Hudson-Smith led 2011 champion Kirani James In the third semi-final both 2022 Olympic champion Steven Gardiner and Olympic medalist Bayapo Ndori pulled up mid-race with hamstring injuries, opening the door for Quincy Hall. van Niekerk's time qualified him for the final, but he was relegated to the inside lane 2.

From the gun in the final, Hudson-Smith was out fastest, making up the stagger on Hall to his outside at the end of the first turn. Inside of him, James was also gaining relative to the staggers. Van Niekerk pushed down the backstretch to try to regain contact with James. As they went into the final turn, Norwood began to move forward. Later in the turn, Watson started to move. As they hit the home stretch, Hudson-Smith had a metre and a half on James with Norwood and Watson about even on the outside another metre back, with van Niekerk about the same distance back on the inside. Still further back, Hall started to accelerate. Watson began to separate from Norwood and van Niekerk with Hall overstriding to try to catch them. 40 metres out, Watson caught James who could offer no more resistance. Norwood got past James and looked like he was closing on a slowing Hudson-Smith. Watson passed Hudson-Smith about 25 metres out and was on to victory. Norwood couldn't quite catch Hudson-Smith but a speeding Hall caught Norwood on the last step for bronze.

== Records ==
Before the competition records were as follows:

Record	Athlete & Nat.	Perf.	Location	Date
World record	Wayde van Niekerk (RSA)	43.03	Rio de Janeiro, Brazil	14 August 2016
Championship record	Michael Johnson (USA)	43.18	Seville, Spain	26 August 1999
World Leading	Steven Gardiner (BAH)	43.74	Székesfehérvár, Hungary	18 July 2023
African Record	Wayde van Niekerk (RSA)	43.03	Rio de Janeiro, Brazil	14 August 2016
Asian Record	Youssef Ahmed Masrahi (KSA)	43.93	Beijing, China	23 August 2015
European Record	Thomas Schönlebe (GDR)	44.33	Rome, Italy	3 September 1987
North, Central American and Caribbean record	Michael Johnson (USA)	43.18	Seville, Spain	26 August 1999
Oceanian record	Darren Clark (AUS)	44.38	Seoul, South Korea	26 September 1988
South American Record	Anthony Zambrano (COL)	43.93	Tokyo, Japan	2 August 2021

== Qualification standard ==
The standard to qualify automatically for entry was 45.00.

== Schedule ==
The event schedule, in local time (UTC+2), was as follows:

Date	Time	Round
20 August	10:25	Heats
22 August	21:00	Semi-finals
24 August	21:35	Final

== Results ==
=== Heats ===
The first 3 athletes in each heat (Q) and the next 6 fastest (q) qualify for the semi-finals.

Rank	Heat	Name	Nationality	Time	Notes
1	3	Håvard Bentdal Ingvaldsen	Norway	44.39	Q, NR
2	2	Wayde van Niekerk	South Africa	44.57	Q
3	1	Steven Gardiner	Bahamas	44.65	Q
4	2	Matthew Hudson-Smith	Great Britain & N.I.	44.69	Q, SB
5	6	Bayapo Ndori	Botswana	44.72	Q
6	5	Antonio Watson	Jamaica	44.77	Q
7	1	Kentaro Sato	Japan	44.77	Q, NR
8	2	Liemarvin Bonevacia	Netherlands	44.78	Q, SB
9	2	Busang Kebinatshipi	Botswana	44.80	q, PB
10	1	Attila Molnár	Hungary	44.84	Q, NR
11	5	Quincy Hall	United States	44.86	Q
12	3	Vernon Norwood	United States	44.87	Q
13	1	Zakithi Nene	South Africa	44.88	q
14	4	Kirani James	Grenada	44.91	Q
15	6	Alexander Doom	Belgium	44.92	Q, PB
16	4	Fuga Sato	Japan	44.97	Q, PB
17	4	Sean Bailey	Jamaica	44.98	Q
18	1	Michael Joseph	Saint Lucia	45.04	q
19	6	Zandrion Barnes	Jamaica	45.05	Q
20	4	Davide Re	Italy	45.07	q, SB
21	5	Yuki Joseph Nakajima	Japan	45.15	Q
22	3	Jereem Richards	Trinidad and Tobago	45.15	Q
23	4	Leungo Scotch	Botswana	45.20	q
24	3	Dylan Borlée	Belgium	45.24	q
25	6	Lucas Carvalho	Brazil	45.34	
25	6	Manuel Sanders	Germany	45.34	
27	3	Oleksandr Pohorilko	Ukraine	45.37	
28	3	João Coelho	Portugal	45.38	
29	2	Elián Larregina	Argentina	45.42	
30	5	Lythe Pillay	South Africa	45.58	
31	4	Dubem Nwachukwu	Nigeria	45.60	
32	4	Gustav Lundholm Nielsen	Denmark	45.66	PB
33	5	Lionel Spitz	Switzerland	45.69	
34	1	Aruna Dharshana	Sri Lanka	45.70	
35	1	Bonface Mweresa	Kenya	45.91	
36	6	Matěj Krsek	Czech Republic	45.99	
37	3	Jonathan Jones	Barbados	46.03	
38	6	Bryce Deadmon	United States	46.20	
39	5	Karol Zalewski	Poland	46.53	
40	5	Christopher O'Donnell	Ireland	46.76	
41	2	Alonzo Russell	Bahamas	46.95	
	5	Desean Boyce	Barbados		DNF
	2	Anthony Zambrano	Colombia		DQ
	4	Carl Bengtström	Sweden		DQ
	3	Ricky Petrucciani	Switzerland		DNS

=== Semi-finals ===
The first 2 athletes in each heat (Q) and the next 2 fastest (q) qualify for the final.

Rank	Heat	Name	Nationality	Time	Notes
1	1	Antonio Watson	Jamaica	44.13	Q, PB
2	1	Vernon Norwood	United States	44.26	Q, PB
3	2	Matthew Hudson-Smith	Great Britain & N.I.	44.26	Q, AR
4	3	Quincy Hall	United States	44.43	Q
5	2	Kirani James	Grenada	44.58	Q
6	1	Wayde van Niekerk	South Africa	44.65	q
7	2	Håvard Bentdal Ingvaldsen	Norway	44.70	q
8	1	Jereem Richards	Trinidad and Tobago	44.76	
9	2	Fuga Sato	Japan	44.88	PB
10	3	Sean Bailey	Jamaica	44.94	Q
11	1	Kentaro Sato	Japan	44.99	
12	1	Attila Molnár	Hungary	45.02	
13	3	Yuki Joseph Nakajima	Japan	45.04	PB
14	2	Liemarvin Bonevacia	Netherlands	45.23	
15	3	Davide Re	Italy	45.29	
16	2	Zandrion Barnes	Jamaica	45.38	
17	1	Michael Joseph	Saint Lucia	45.50	
18	3	Alexander Doom	Belgium	45.57	
19	2	Dylan Borlée	Belgium	45.59	
20	3	Zakithi Nene	South Africa	45.64	
21	1	Leungo Scotch	Botswana	45.96	
22	2	Busang Kebinatshipi	Botswana	46.39	
	3	Steven Gardiner	Bahamas		DNF
	3	Bayapo Ndori	Botswana		DNF

=== Final ===
The final started at 21:35 on 24 August. The results were as follows:

Rank	Name	Nationality	Time	Notes
1st place, gold medalist(s)	Antonio Watson	Jamaica	44.22	
2nd place, silver medalist(s)	Matthew Hudson-Smith	Great Britain & N.I.	44.31	
3rd place, bronze medalist(s)	Quincy Hall	United States	44.37	PB
4	Vernon Norwood	United States	44.39	
5	Sean Bailey	Jamaica	44.96	
6	Håvard Bentdal Ingvaldsen	Norway	45.08	
7	Wayde van Niekerk	South Africa	45.11	
	Kirani James	Grenada	DQ (Note: Originally finished 5th with 44.52)	TR17.3.1: Lane infraction
