= Grenada at the 2013 World Championships in Athletics =

- WA code: GRN

in Moscow
- Competitors: 2
- Medals: Gold 0 Silver 0 Bronze 0 Total 0

World Championships in Athletics appearances
- 1983; 1987; 1991; 1993; 1995; 1997; 1999; 2001; 2003; 2005; 2007; 2009; 2011; 2013; 2015; 2017; 2019; 2022; 2023

Grenada competed at the 2013 World Championships in Athletics from August 10 to August 18 in Moscow, Russia. A team of 2 athletes was announced to represent the country in the event.

== Results ==
(q – qualified, NM – no mark, SB – season best)

=== Men ===
Athlete	Event	Heats		Semifinals		Final	
Athlete	Event	Time	Rank	Time	Rank	Time	Rank
Kirani James	400 metres	45.00	2nd	44.81	4th	44.99	7th

Decathlon

Kurt Felix	Decathlon		
Kurt Felix	Event	Points	Rank
	100 m	817	25th
	Long jump	1730	21st
	Shot put	2394	26th
	High jump	3272	18th
	400 m	3272	29th
	110 m hurdles		
	Discus throw		
	Pole vault		
	Javelin throw		
	1500 m		
Total			
