= Grenada at the 2017 World Championships in Athletics =

- Flag of Grenada
- WA code: GRN
- National federation: Grenada Athletic Association
- Website: grenadaathleticassociation.org

in London, United Kingdom 4–13 August 2017
- Competitors: 3 (3 men) in 3 events
- Medals: Gold 0 Silver 0 Bronze 0 Total 0

World Championships in Athletics appearances
- 1983; 1987; 1991; 1993; 1995; 1997; 1999; 2001; 2003; 2005; 2007; 2009; 2011; 2013; 2015; 2017; 2019; 2022; 2023

Grenada competed at the 2017 World Championships in Athletics in London, United Kingdom, from 4–13 August 2017.

== Results ==
=== Men ===
Field events

Athlete	Event	Qualification		Final	
Athlete	Event	Distance	Position	Distance	Position
Anderson Peters	Javelin throw	78.99	20	Did not advance	

Combined events – Decathlon

Athlete	Event	100 m	LJ	SP	HJ	400 m	110H	DT	PV	JT	1500 m	Final	Rank
Kurt Felix	Result	11.08 SB	7.46	15.01	2.08 SB	49.09	14.68 SB	45.39	4.50 SB	64.64	4:36.62	8227	7
Kurt Felix	Points	843	925	790	878	857	889	775	760	808	702	8227	7
Lindon Victor	Result	10.83	6.98	15.86	1.99	49.30	15.36	NM	NH	–	–	DNF	–
Lindon Victor	Points	899	809	843	794	847	807	0	0			DNF	–
