= Botswana at the 2023 World Athletics Championships =

- Flag of Botswana
- WA code: BOT

in Budapest, Hungary 19 August 2023 – 27 August 2023
- Competitors: 14 (8 men and 6 women)
- Medals Ranked 26th: Gold 0 Silver 1 Bronze 1 Total 2

World Athletics Championships appearances
- 1983; 1987; 1991; 1993; 1995; 1997; 1999; 2001; 2003; 2005; 2007; 2009; 2011; 2013; 2015; 2017; 2019; 2022; 2023

Botswana competed at the 2023 World Athletics Championships in Budapest, Hungary, from 19 to 27 August 2023.

== Medalists ==
Medal	Athlete	Event	Date
Silver	Letsile Tebogo	Men's 100 metres	August 20
Bronze	Letsile Tebogo	Men's 200 metres	August 25

== Results ==
Botswana entered 14 athletes.

Key

- Q = Qualified for the next round
- q = Qualified for the next round as a fastest loser or, in field events, by position without achieving the qualifying target
- NR = National record
- PB = Personal best
- SB = Season best
- N/A = Round not applicable for the event

=== Men ===
Track and road events

Athlete	Event	Heat		Semi-final		Final	
Athlete	Event	Result	Rank	Result	Rank	Result	Rank
Letsile Tebogo	100 metres	10.11	1 Q	9.98	2 Q	9.88 NR	(silver)
Letsile Tebogo	200 metres	20.22	1 Q	19.97	2 Q	19.81	3rd place, bronze medalist(s)
Busang Kebinatshipi	400 metres	44.80 PB	4 q	46.39	8	Did not advance	
Bayapo Ndori	400 metres	44.72	1 Q	DNF		Did not advance	
Leungo Scotch	400 metres	45.20	5 q	45.96	8	Did not advance	
Tshepiso Masalela	800 metres	1:45.60	4 q	1:44.14 PB	2 Q	1:45.57	6
Zibane Ngozi; Baboloki Thebe; Laone Ditshetelo; Leungo Scotch	4 x 400 metres relay	2:59.42 SB	4 q	—		DQ	

=== Women ===
Track and road events

Athlete	Event	Heat		Semi-final		Final	
Athlete	Event	Result	Rank	Result	Rank	Result	Rank
Oratile Nowe	800 metres	2:01.62 NR	7	Did not advance			
Lydia Jele; Oratile Nowe; Galefele Moroko; Obakeng Kamberuka	4 x 400 metres relay	3:31.85	8	—		Did not advance	
