= Barbados at the 2023 World Athletics Championships =

- Flag of Barbados
- WA code: BAR
- National federation: Athletics Association of Barbados
- Website: aab.sports.bb

in Budapest, Hungary 19 August 2023 – 27 August 2023
- Competitors: 3 (2 men and 1 woman)
- Medals Ranked 39th: Gold 0 Silver 0 Bronze 1 Total 1

World Athletics Championships appearances
- 1983; 1987; 1991; 1993; 1995; 1997; 1999; 2001; 2003; 2005; 2007; 2009; 2011; 2013; 2015; 2017; 2019; 2022; 2023

Barbados competed at the 2023 World Athletics Championships in Budapest, Hungary, from 19 to 27 August 2023.

== Medalists ==
| Medal | Athlete | Event | Date |
|---|---|---|---|
| Bronze | Sada Williams | Women's 400 metres | August 23 |

== Results ==
Barbados entered 3 athletes.

Key

- Q = Qualified for the next round
- q = Qualified for the next round as a fastest loser or, in field events, by position without achieving the qualifying target
- NR = National record
- PB = Personal best
- SB = Season best
- N/A = Round not applicable for the event

=== Men ===
Track and road events

| Athlete | Event | Heat | | Semi-final | | Final | |
| Athlete | Event | Result | Rank | Result | Rank | Result | Rank |
|---|---|---|---|---|---|---|---|
| DeSean Boyce | 400 metres | DNF | | Did not advance | | | |
| Jonathan Jones | 400 metres | 46.03 | 7 | Did not advance | | | |

=== Women ===
Track and road events

| Athlete | Event | Heat | | Semi-final | | Final | |
| Athlete | Event | Result | Rank | Result | Rank | Result | Rank |
|---|---|---|---|---|---|---|---|
| Sada Williams | 400 metres | 50.78 | 1 Q | 49.58 NR | 2 Q | 49.60 | 3rd place, bronze medalist(s) |
