= Grenada at the 2015 World Championships in Athletics =

- WA code: GRN

in Beijing
- Competitors: 3
- Medals Ranked 32nd: Gold 0 Silver 0 Bronze 1 Total 1

World Championships in Athletics appearances
- 1983; 1987; 1991; 1993; 1995; 1997; 1999; 2001; 2003; 2005; 2007; 2009; 2011; 2013; 2015; 2017; 2019; 2022; 2023

Grenada competed at the 2015 World Championships in Athletics in Beijing, China, from 22 to 30 August 2015.

== Medalists ==
Medal	Athlete	Event	Date
Bronze	Kirani James	Men's 400 metres	26 August

== Results ==
(q – qualified, NM – no mark, SB – season best)

=== Men ===
Track and road events

Athlete	Event	Heat		Semifinal		Final	
Athlete	Event	Result	Rank	Result	Rank	Result	Rank
Kirani James	400 metres	44.56	10 Q	44.16	2 Q	43.78 SB	3rd place, bronze medalist(s)
Bralon Taplin	400 metres	46.27	41	did not advance			

Combined events – Decathlon

Athlete	Event	100 m	LJ	SP	HJ	400 m	110H	DT	PV	JT	1500 m	Final	Rank
Kurt Felix	Result	11.02	7.66 SB	15.02	2.10 SB	49.89	14.58 PB	45.95 PB	4.50	63.41	4:32.57 PB	8	8302 NR
Kurt Felix	Points	856	975	791	896	820	901	786	760	789	728	8	8302 NR
