= Grenada at the 2019 World Athletics Championships =

- WA code: GRN

in Doha, Qatar 27 September 2019 – 6 October 2019
- Competitors: 3 in 3 events
- Medals Ranked 17th: Gold 1 Silver 0 Bronze 0 Total 1

World Athletics Championships appearances
- 1983; 1987; 1991; 1993; 1995; 1997; 1999; 2001; 2003; 2005; 2007; 2009; 2011; 2013; 2015; 2017; 2019; 2022; 2023

Grenada competed at the 2019 World Athletics Championships in Doha, Qatar, from 27 September to 6 October 2019.

== Medalists ==
| Medal | Name | Event | Date |
|---|---|---|---|
| Gold | Anderson Peters | Men's javelin throw | 6 October |

== Results ==
Key

- Q = Qualified for the next round
- q = Qualified for the next round as a fastest loser or, in field events, by position without achieving the qualifying target
- NR = National record
- PB = Personal best
- SB = Season best
- N/A = Round not applicable for the event

=== Men ===
Track and road events

| Athlete | Event | Heat | | Semifinal | | Final | |
| Athlete | Event | Result | Rank | Result | Rank | Result | Rank |
|---|---|---|---|---|---|---|---|
| Kirani James | 400 metres | 44.94 | 1 Q | 44.23 SB | 2 Q | 44.54 | 5 |

Field events

| Athlete | Event | Qualification | | Final | |
| Athlete | Event | Distance | Position | Distance | Position |
|---|---|---|---|---|---|
| Anderson Peters | Javelin throw | 85.34 | 3 Q | 86.89 | 1st place, gold medalist(s) |

Combined events – Decathlon

| Athlete | Event | 100 m | LJ | SP | HJ | 400 m | 110H | DT | PV | JT | 1500 m | Final | Rank |
|---|---|---|---|---|---|---|---|---|---|---|---|---|---|
| Lindon Victor | Result | 10.66 | 7.51 PB | 16.24 SB | 2.05 SB | 48.55 SB | 14.82 SB | NM | NM | DNS | – | DNF | – |
| Lindon Victor | Points | 938 | 937 | 866 | 850 | 883 | 871 | 0 | 0 | 0 | – | DNF | – |
