= Puerto Rico at the 2023 World Athletics Championships =

- Flag of Puerto Rico
- WA code: PUR

in Budapest, Hungary 19 August 2023 – 27 August 2023
- Competitors: 10 (6 men and 4 women)
- Medals Ranked 27th: Gold 0 Silver 1 Bronze 0 Total 1

World Athletics Championships appearances (overview)
- 1983; 1987; 1991; 1993; 1995; 1997; 1999; 2001; 2003; 2005; 2007; 2009; 2011; 2013; 2015; 2017; 2019; 2022; 2023; 2025

Puerto Rico competed at the 2023 World Athletics Championships in Budapest, Hungary, from 19 to 27 August 2023.

== Medallists ==
Medal	Name	Event	Date
Silver	Jasmine Camacho-Quinn	Women's 100 metres hurdles	24 August

== Results ==
Puerto Rico entered 10 athletes.

Key

- Q = Qualified for the next round
- q = Qualified for the next round as a fastest loser or, in field events, by position without achieving the qualifying target
- NR = National record
- PB = Personal best
- SB = Season best
- N/A = Round not applicable for the event

=== Men ===
Track and road events

Athlete	Event	Heat		Semifinal		Final	
Athlete	Event	Result	Rank	Result	Rank	Result	Rank
John Rivera	800 metres	1:48.83	7	Did not advance			
Ryan Sánchez	800 metres	1:48.24	5	Did not advance			
Rob Napolitano	1500 metres	3:48.29	12	Did not advance			

Field events

Athlete	Event	Qualification		Final	
Athlete	Event	Distance	Position	Distance	Position
Luis Castro	High jump	2.22	25	Did not advance	
Jerome Vega	Hammer throw	72.87	19	Did not advance	

Combined events – Decathlon

Athlete	Event	100 m	LJ	SP	HJ	400 m	110H	DT	PV	JT	1500 m	Final	Rank
Ayden Owens-Delerme	Result	10.43	7.72	14.30	1.90	46.44 SB	14.04	44.17	NM	DNF			
Ayden Owens-Delerme	Points	992	990	747	714	986	969	750	0	DNF			

=== Women ===
Track and road events

Athlete	Event	Heat		Semifinal		Final	
Athlete	Event	Result	Rank	Result	Rank	Result	Rank
Gabby Scott	400 metres	51.07 SB	3 Q	51.52	6	Did not advance	
Jasmine Camacho-Quinn	100 metres hurdles	12.50	1 Q	12.41	1 Q	12.44	2nd place, silver medalist(s)
Beverly Ramos	Marathon	—				DNF	
Rachelle De Orbeta	20 kilometres walk	—				1:33:19	24
