= Grace Konrad =

Canadian sprinter (born 1999)

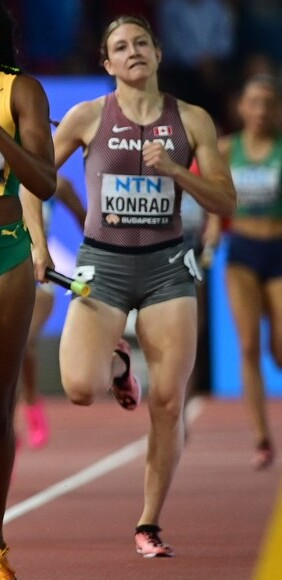
- Konrad at the 2023 World Athletics Championships

Personal information
- Born: August 16, 1999 (age 26) Edmonton, Alberta, Canada
- Education: Trinity Western University
- Height: 5 ft 8 in (173 cm)

Sport
- Event(s): 300 m, 400 m
- University team: Trinity Western Spartans
- Club: Capital City Track Club
- Coached by: Rob Fisher

Achievements and titles
- Personal bests: 300 m: 37.36i (Edmonton 2024); 400 m: 51.60 (Budapest 2023)

Grace Konrad (born August 16, 1999) is a Canadian sprinter who competes in the 400 metres. She is the 2023 Canadian 400 m champion and represented Canada at the 2023 World Athletics Championships, finishing fourth as part of Canada's 4 × 400 m relay team.

== Athletics career ==
=== Trinity Western University ===
Hailing from Edmonton, Alberta, Konrad competed for the Trinity Western Spartans track and field team from 2017 to 2022, competing primarily in the 300 m. She won the 2019 and 2020 Canada West 300 m title and placed fifth at the 2019 USPORTS Championships in the 300 m, following that performance with a fourth-place finish in 2020 in a personal best of 38.93.

In 2022, she defended her Can West 300 m title and contested her final USPORTS Track and Field Championships, competing in the 300 m as well as the 600 m and 4 × 200 m relay. She would go on to place second in both the 300 and 600 m, and earn a bronze medal alongside her TWU teammates in the 4 × 200 m relay.

In August 2022, Konrad set a personal best of 53.28 to win the 400 m at the Canada Summer Games. Representing Team Alberta, she also contested the 4 × 100 and 4 × 400 m relays, placing second in both.

=== International career ===
In 2023, she set successive 400 m personal bests of 52.59 and 51.96 in Calgary and then in Guelph. At the Canadian Championships, Konrad won her first national title, running 52.06 to beat out defending champion Aiyanna Stiverne and reigning silver medalist Lauren Gale.

She was then selected to represent Canada in both the individual 400 m and 4 × 400 m relay at the World Championships in Budapest, Hungary. In the 400 m, she ran a personal best of 51.60 in her heat, but it was not enough to advance her to the semi-finals. In the relay, she anchored Canada's women's 4 × 400 team, composed of Aiyanna Stiverne, Zoe Sherar, and Kyra Constantine to a third consecutive fourth-place finish at a major championship, following Canada's performances in Tokyo and Eugene.

In fall 2023, Konrad competed at the Pan American Games in Santiago, Chile, placing fourth in 52.10, just 0.15 seconds out of a medal.

== Championship results ==
Representing Canada
Year	Competition	Venue	Position	Event	Time
2023	World Championships	Budapest, Hungary	30th	400 m	51.60
2023	World Championships	Budapest, Hungary	4th	4 × 400 m	3:22.42
2023	Pan Am Games	Santiago, Chile	4th	400 m	52.10
