= Rondell Bartholomew =

Grenadian sprinter (born 1990)

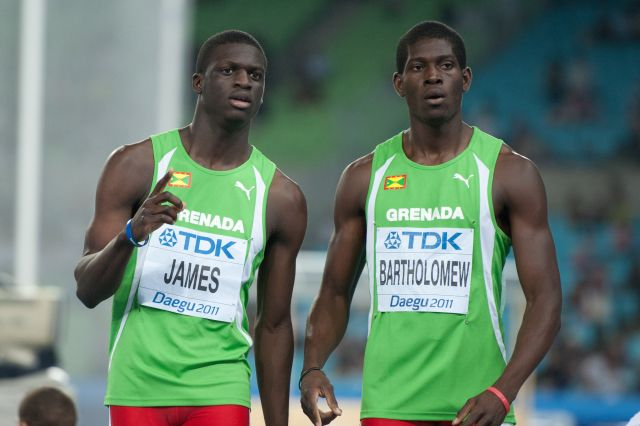
- Bartholomew (right) next to his countryman Kirani James at the 2011 World Championships in Athletics.

Personal information
- Born: 7 April 1990 (age 36) Saint Patrick, Grenada
- Height: 1.84 m (6 ft 1/2 in)
- Weight: 60 kg (130 lb)

Sport
- Country: Grenada
- Sport: Athletics
- Event: 400 metres

Achievements and titles
- Personal best(s): 200m 20.95; 400m 44.65; 200m(Indoor) 20.87; 300m(Indoor) 33.88; 400m(Indoor) 45.84
Medal record
Athletics
Representing Grenada
CARIFTA Games Junior (U20)
Gold medal – first place	2008 Basseterre	400 m
Silver medal – second place	2009 Vieux Fort	400 m
Bronze medal – third place	2009 Vieux Fort	4x400 m relay
- Updated on 22 July 2012

Rondell Bartholomew (born 7 April 1990) is a Grenadian track and field sprinter who specialises in the 400 metres. He has represented his country at two World Championships in Athletics and was a 400 m world finalist in 2011. His personal best for the event is 44.65 seconds.

He has won medals at junior level at the CARIFTA Games and Pan American Junior Championships. He helped set a Grenadian record of 3:04.69 minutes for the 4×400 metres relay in 2011.

== Career ==
Born in Saint Patrick Parish, Grenada, he began competing in track and field at high school. Although Grenada had produced a 400 m world indoor champion in Alleyne Francique, Bartholomew stated that it was his family that provided him with inspiration to focus on running. He began competing internationally in athletics in 2008. At the CARIFTA Games that year he won the under-20's 400 m title in a personal best time of 46.86 seconds, reached the 200 metres semi-finals and also ran in both the Grenadian relay teams. He was a 400 m semi-finalist at the 2008 World Junior Championships in Athletics that July, then came sixth over the distance at the 2008 Commonwealth Youth Games (a race which was won by his younger compatriot Kirani James).

Bartholomew completed a Grenadian 1–2 finish with James at the 2009 CARIFTA Games, taking the 400 m silver medal in a personal best of 45.58 seconds (his first sub-46-second run). The duo then teamed up to win the bronze medal in the 4×400 metres relay race. At the 2009 Pan American Junior Athletics Championships, Bartholomew was again beaten by James, but managed to win the bronze medal behind American athlete Tavaris Tate. With a team including James, Akim Bowen and Josh Charles, he set a national junior record of 3:11.91 minutes for the 4×400 m relay at the championships. Bartholomew had acquired the world qualifying time and made his senior debut at the 2009 World Championships in Athletics, running in the heats of the 400 m.

He began attending South Plains College in Texas in 2010 and represented them athletically. He improved his 400 m best to 45.28 seconds with a win at the Michael Johnson Classic in Waco, Texas and claimed both the individual and relay Junior NCAA titles for South Plains. At the start of the 2011 season he won the 600 metres NCAA Indoor Junior title and came second over 200 m. He had his first run under 45 seconds at the Texas Tech Invitational, where he won the 400 m in a time of 44.65 seconds, which was the fastest time in the world at that point and brought the 21-year-old attention on the global stage. At the Penn Relays, he and Kirani James headed a 4×400 m relay team to a Grenadian record of 3:04.69 minutes – a mark which they later improved to 3:04.27 minutes at the 2011 Central American and Caribbean Championships in Athletics. He made his professional debut at the Adidas Grand Prix in New York (coming third) and also ran at the DN Galan and London Grand Prix Diamond League meetings.

He entered the 2011 World Championships in Athletics as the second fastest man in the men's 400 metres field. He made the event final and finished in sixth place with a time of 45.45 seconds, while Kirani James went on to win Grenada's first ever gold medal at the competition.

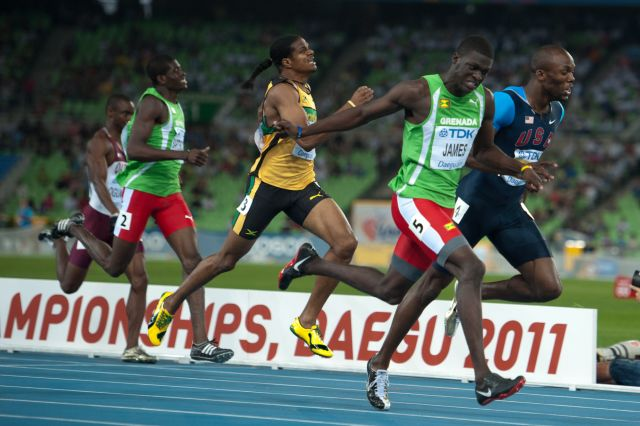
Bartholomew (left in green) running in the 2011 World Championship final

After years of battling injuries, Bartholomew returned to competition in 2016. He took part in the OECS Championships in that year and helped Grenada to secure a silver medal in the 4X400m relay at the track meet in Tortola.

The beginning of his 2017 was highlighted by a return to his home country for the inaugural Grenada Invitational where he had a season opener in the 400m with a time of 47.14.

== Achievements ==
Year	Competition	Venue	Position	Event	Notes
Representing Grenada
2008	CARIFTA Games (U-20)	Basseterre, Saint Kitts and Nevis	5th (sf)	200 m	21.61 (-1.1 m/s)
2008	CARIFTA Games (U-20)	Basseterre, Saint Kitts and Nevis	1st	400 m	46.86
2008	CARIFTA Games (U-20)	Basseterre, Saint Kitts and Nevis	5th	4x100 m relay	41.75
2008	CARIFTA Games (U-20)	Basseterre, Saint Kitts and Nevis	5th	4x400 m relay	3:18.92
2008	World Junior Championships	Bydgoszcz, Poland	15th (sf)	400 m	47.60
2008	Commonwealth Youth Games	Pune, India	5th (h)	200 m	22.73 (0.2 m/s)
2008	Commonwealth Youth Games	Pune, India	6th	400 m	48.21
2009	CARIFTA Games (U-20)	Vieux Fort, Saint Lucia	2nd	400 m	45.58
2009	CARIFTA Games (U-20)	Vieux Fort, Saint Lucia	3rd	4x400 m relay	3:11.93
2009	World Championships	Berlin, Germany	39th (h)	400 m	46.85
2011	World Championships	Daegu, South Korea	6th	400 m	45.45
2016	OECS Track & Field Championships	Tortola, British Virgin Islands	2nd	4x400m relay	3:09.74
