= Josh Boateng =

Grenadian shot putter, discus thrower (born 1997)

Personal information
- Nationality: Grenadian
- Born: 28 March 1997 (age 29) St. George's, Grenada
- Height: 63
- Weight: 280 lb (127 kg)

Sport
- Sport: Track and field
- Event: Discus throw
- College team: Texas A&M–Commerce Lions

Achievements and titles
- Personal best(s): Discus Throw 61.00m NR; Discus Throw 57.19 (1.750kg) NJR; Discus Throw 51.24 (1.500kg); Shot Put 17.77m (Indoor) NR; Shot Put 18.70m (Outdoor) NR; Hammer Throw 44.25m

Josh Boateng (born 28 March 1997) is a Grenadian shot put and discus thrower. He is the Grenadian national record holder in both events and the national junior record holder in the discus.

== College career ==
=== 2018 ===
On 20 January 2018, Boateng broke the national record (Indoor) Shot Put throw of 16.77m at the Pima Aztec Indoor Invitational in Tucson, Arizona. On 24 March 2018 he reset the Outdoor Shot Put Record with a throw of 17.78m at the UTEP Springtime Invitational. He further improved on the Shot Put record on 3 May at the NJCAA Region I Track & Field Championships in Mesa, Arizona with a throw of 18.08m. He further went on to increase to 18.11m in a second-place finish at the NJCAA Division I Outdoor Championships and won the discus competition with a throw of 55.97m.

=== 2019 ===
Boateng began his 2019 season representing Texas A&M University-Commerce at the Pittsburg State Invitational on 26 January. His 17.41m throw served as both a new school record as well as a Grenadian Indoor Record. He went on to improve on those records with a 17.77 throw at the Gorilla Classic on 9 February. He went on to win the Lone Star Conference Indoor Championships at Texas Tech University on February 17 with a 17.69m performance at Shot Put.

On March 29 at the Texas Relays, Boateng equalled his own National Record in the Shot Put. He also had a 56.80m performance in the Discus. As a result of these performances he was to be named Lone Star Conference Athlete of the Week for the second time. The following week Boateng claimed the National Discus Record with a throw of 59.37 thus breaking the 15-year-old record. He earn a third consecutive Lone Star Conference co-Field Athlete of the Week nod for his efforts. On 11 April at the East Texas Invitational he further extended his National Record to 60.77m, breaking a 36-year-old school record. He received his fourth consecutive selection as athlete of the week in the Lonestar Conference. On April 25, 2019, at Abilene Christian University's Oliver Jackson Twilight, Boateng extended his National and School Record in the Discus Throw to 61m. He first Athlete from his school to ever go over 200 feet at 61.00 meters (200-1), notching the fourth-longest throw in Division II history. Following this performance he was named USTFCCCA Division II athlete of the week He went on to be named USTFCCCA South Central Region Field Athlete of the Year.

=== 2020 ===
Boateng opened his 2020 campaign at the Corky Classic hosted by Texas Tech. He earned a provisional mark in the men's shot put at 16.50 meters (54-1 ¾) on his first throw of the season, ranking 17th in the nation.

== Competition record ==
All information taken from World Athletics profile.

Year	Competition	Venue	Position	Event	Notes
Representing Grenada
2014	CARIFTA Games	Fort-de-France, Martinique	3rd	Discus throw (1.500 kg) (U18)	47.84 m
2014	Summer Youth Olympics	Nanjing, China	16th	Discus throw (1.500 kg) (U18)	51.24 m
2015	CARIFTA Games	Basseterre, Saint Kitts and Nevis	2nd	Discus throw (1.750 kg) (U20)	51.14m
2015	Pan American Junior Athletics Championships	Edmonton, Canada	6th	Discus throw (1.750 kg) (U20)	52.52m
2016	CARIFTA Games	St. George's, Grenada	1st	Discus Throw (1.750 kg) (U20)	57.19m "NJR"
2016	OECS Track and Field Championships	Tortola, British Virgin Islands	3rd	Discus throw	47.85m
2016	World U20 Championships	Bydgoszcz, Poland	16th	Discus throw (1.750 kg)	57.04m
2019	Pan American Games	Lima, Peru	7th	Discus Throw	56.92m
