= Grenada at the 2023 World Athletics Championships =

- Flag of Grenada
- WA code: GRN

in Budapest, Hungary 19 August 2023 – 27 August 2023
- Competitors: 4 (3 men and 1 woman)
- Medals Ranked 39th: Gold 0 Silver 0 Bronze 1 Total 1

World Athletics Championships appearances
- 1983; 1987; 1991; 1993; 1995; 1997; 1999; 2001; 2003; 2005; 2007; 2009; 2011; 2013; 2015; 2017; 2019; 2022; 2023

Grenada competed at the 2023 World Athletics Championships in Budapest, Hungary, from 19 to 27 August 2023.

== Medallists ==
Medal	Athlete	Event	Date
Bronze	Lindon Victor	Men's decathlon	August 26

== Results ==
Grenada entered 4 athletes.

Key

- Q = Qualified for the next round
- q = Qualified for the next round as a fastest loser or, in field events, by position without achieving the qualifying target
- NR = National record
- PB = Personal best
- SB = Season best
- N/A = Round not applicable for the event

=== Men ===
Track and road events

Athlete	Event	Heat		Semi-final		Final	
Athlete	Event	Result	Rank	Result	Rank	Result	Rank
Kirani James	400 metres	44.91	1 Q	44.58	2 Q	DQ	

Field events

Athlete	Event	Qualification		Final	
Athlete	Event	Distance	Position	Distance	Position
Anderson Peters	Javelin throw	78.49	16	Did not advance	

Combined events – Decathlon

Athlete	Event	100 m	LJ	SP	HJ	400 m	110H	DT	PV	JT	1500 m	Final	Rank
Lindon Victor	Result	10.60 SB	7.55 SB	15.94	2.05 SB	48.05 PB	14.47 SB	54.97 CDB	4.80	68.05 SB	4:39.67 PB	8756 NR	3rd place, bronze medalist(s)
Lindon Victor	Points	952	947	848	822	907	915	974	849	860	682	8756 NR	3rd place, bronze medalist(s)

=== Women ===
Track and road events

Athlete	Event	Heat		Semi-final		Final	
Athlete	Event	Result	Rank	Result	Rank	Result	Rank
Halle Hazzard	100 metres	11.34 SB	5	Did not advance			
