= Saint Kitts and Nevis at the 2015 Pan American Games =

- IOC code: SKN
- NOC: St. Kitts and Nevis Olympic Committee

in Toronto, Canada 10–26 July 2015
- Competitors: 8 in 1 sport
- Flag bearer (opening): Antoine Adams
- Flag bearer (closing): Shenel Crooke
- Medals Ranked =28th: Gold 0 Silver 0 Bronze 1 Total 1

Pan American Games appearances (overview)
- 1995; 1999; 2003; 2007; 2011; 2015; 2019; 2023

Saint Kitts and Nevis competed in the 2015 Pan American Games in Toronto, Canada from July 10 to 26, 2015.

On July 8, 2015, the St. Kitts and Nevis Olympic Committee announced a team of 8 athletes competing in 1 sport (athletics).

Track and field athlete Antoine Adams was the flagbearer for the team during the opening ceremony.

After winning two silver medals at the last edition of the games in 2011, the country won a solitary bronze medal through sprinter Antoine Adams in the 100 metres event.

== Competitors ==
The following table lists the Saint Kitts and Nevis delegation per sport and gender.

Sport	Men	Women	Total
Athletics	6	2	8
Total	6	2	8

== Medalists ==
The following competitors from Saint Kitts and Nevis won medals at the games. In the by discipline sections below, medalists' names are bolded.

Medal	Name	Sport	Event	Date
Bronze	Antoine Adams	Athletics	Men's 100 m	July 22

**Medals by sport**
**Sport**	1st place, gold medalist(s)	2nd place, silver medalist(s)	3rd place, bronze medalist(s)	**Total**
Athletics	0	0	1	1
**Total**	**0**	**0**	**1**	**1**

**Medals by day**
**Day**	1st place, gold medalist(s)	2nd place, silver medalist(s)	3rd place, bronze medalist(s)	**Total**
July 22	0	0	0	1
**Total**	**0**	**0**	**1**	**1**

**Medals by gender**
**Gender**	1st place, gold medalist(s)	2nd place, silver medalist(s)	3rd place, bronze medalist(s)	**Total**
Male	0	0	1	1
Female	0	0	0	0
**Total**	**0**	**0**	**1**	**1**

== Athletics ==
Saint Kitts qualified eight athletes.

Key

- Note – Ranks given for track events are for the entire round
- **Q** = Qualified for the next round
- **q** = Qualified for the next round as a fastest loser or, in field events, by position without achieving the qualifying target
- **SB** = Seasonal best
- N/A = Round not applicable for the event

Men

Athlete	Event	Round 1		Semifinal		Final	
Athlete	Event	Result	Rank	Result	Rank	Result	Rank
**Antoine Adams**	100 m	10.11	7 **Q**	10.05 **SB**	2 **Q**	10.09	3rd place, bronze medalist(s)
Brijesh Lawrence	100 m	10.31	=17	did not advance			
Antoine Adams	200 m	20.62	14 **q**	20.82	16	did not advance	
Lestrod Roland	200 m	21.02	22	did not advance			
Antoine Adams; Allistar Clarke; Delwayne Delaney; Brijesh Lawrence; Jason Rogers; Lestrod Roland	4 x 100 metres relay	—N/a		39.10	9	did not advance	

Women

Athlete	Event	Round 1		Semifinal		Final	
Athlete	Event	Result	Rank	Result	Rank	Result	Rank
Shenel Crooke	100 m	11.43	=17	did not advance			
Marecia Pemberton	100 m	11.68	22	did not advance			

== See also ==
- Saint Kitts and Nevis at the 2016 Summer Olympics
