= 2014 IAAF World Relays – Men's 4 × 100 metres relay =

Men's 4 × 100 metres relay at the 2014 IAAF World Relays
- Venue: Thomas Robinson Stadium
- Dates: 25 May (heats & final)

The men's 4 × 100 metres relay at the 2014 IAAF World Relays was held at the Thomas Robinson Stadium on 25 May.

== Records ==
Prior to the competition, the records were as follows:

World record	Jamaica (Nesta Carter, Michael Frater, Yohan Blake, Usain Bolt)	36.84	(United Kingdom) London, Great Britain	11 August 2012
Championship record	New event			
World Leading	(United States) University of Florida	38.29	Austin, Texas, United States	29 March 2014
African Record	Nigeria (Osmond Ezinwa, Olapade Adeniken, Francis Obikwelu, Davidson Ezinwa)	37.94	Athens, Greece	9 August 1997
Asian Record	Japan (Nobuharu Asahara, Shinji Takahira, Shingo Suetsugu, Naoki Tsukahara)	38.03	Osaka, Japan	1 September 2007
North, Central American and Caribbean record	Jamaica (Nesta Carter, Michael Frater, Yohan Blake, Usain Bolt)	36.84	(United Kingdom) London, Great Britain	11 August 2012
South American Record	Brazil (Vicente de Lima, Édson Ribeiro, André da Silva, Claudinei da Silva)	37.90	Sydney, Australia	30 September 2000
European Record	Great Britain (Jason Gardener, Darren Campbell, Marlon Devonish, Dwain Chambers)	37.73	Sevilla, Spain	29 August 1999
Oceanian record	Australia (Paul Henderson, Tim Jackson, Steve Brimacombe, Damien Marsh)	38.17	Gothenburg, Sweden	12 August 1995
Oceanian record	Australia (Anthony Alozie, Isaac Ntiamoah, Andrew McCabe, Josh Ross)	38.17	(United Kingdom) London, Great Britain	10 August 2012

== Schedule ==
Date	Time	Round
25 May 2014	17:50	Heats
25 May 2014	20:00	Final

All times are local times (UTC-4)

== Results ==
KEY:	q	Fastest non-qualifiers	Q	Qualified	NR	National record	PB	Personal best	SB	Seasonal best

=== Heats ===
Qualification: First 2 of each heat (Q) plus the 2 fastest times (q) advanced to the final.

Rank	Heat	Lane	Nation	Athletes	Time	Notes
1	2	7	Jamaica	Nesta Carter, Kemar Bailey-Cole, Julian Forte, Andrew Fisher	37.71	Q, CR
2	1	5	Great Britain	Richard Kilty, Harry Aikines-Aryeetey, James Ellington, Daniel Talbot	37.93	Q, SB
3	1	8	Trinidad and Tobago	Keston Bledman, Marc Burns, Rondel Sorrillo, Richard Thompson	38.09	Q, SB
4	2	5	Brazil	Bruno de Barros, Jefferson Lucindo, Aldemir da Silva Junior, Jorge Vides	38.10	Q, SB
5	2	4	France	Arnaud Remy, Jimmy Vicaut, Ben Bassaw, Christophe Lemaitre	38.33	q, SB
6	1	3	Japan	Kazuma Oseto, Kei Takase, Yoshihide Kiryu, Shōta Iizuka	38.34	q, SB
7	1	2	Cuba	Yaniel Carrero, Roberto Skyers, Reynier Mena, Yadier Cuéllar	38.44	SB
8	1	6	Netherlands	Giovanni Codrington, Churandy Martina, Jorén Tromp, Hensley Paulina	38.52	SB
9	2	6	Poland	Remigiusz Olszewski, Dariusz Kuć, Kamil Masztak, Karol Zalewski	38.60	SB
10	3	4	Germany	Aleixo-Platini Menga, Lucas Jakubczyk, Julian Reus, Martin Keller	38.62	Q, SB
11	3	8	Canada	Gavin Smellie, Dontae Richards-Kwok, Jared Connaughton, Justyn Warner	38.70	Q, SB
12	3	7	Saint Kitts and Nevis	Jason Rogers, Antoine Adams, Lestrod Roland, Brijesh Lawrence	38.76	SB
13	3	3	Ukraine	Emil Ibragimov, Serhiy Smelyk, Ihor Bodrov, Vitaliy Korzh	38.91	SB
14	2	8	China	Chen Shiwei, Xie Zhenye, Yang Yang, Mo Youxue	39.00	SB
15	1	7	Australia	Jin Su Jung, Jarrod Geddes, Jake Hammond, Alexander Hartmann	39.21	SB
16	2	2	Barbados	Andrew Hinds, Levi Cadogan, Ackeem Forde, Ramon Gittens	39.27	SB
17	2	3	Venezuela	Dubeiker Cedeño, Arturo Ramírez, Álvaro Luis Cassiani, Diego Rivas	39.29	SB
18	1	4	Cayman Islands	Kemar Hyman, Tyrell Cuffy, David Hamil, Rhymiech Adolphus	39.76	SB
	3	2	United States	Marvin Bracy, Trell Kimmons, Rakieem Salaam, Charles Silmon	DQ	R170.7
	3	5	Bahamas	Johnathan Farquharson, Adrian Griffith, Stephen Newbold, Blake Bartlett	DQ	R170.7
	3	6	Nigeria		DNS	

=== Final B ===
Rank	Lane	Nation	Athletes	Time	Notes
9	7	Ukraine	Emil Ibrahimov, Serhiy Smelyk, Ihor Bodrov, Vitaliy Korzh	38.53	=NR
10	6	Cuba	Yaniel Carrero, Roberto Skyers, Reynier Mena, Yadier Cuéllar	38.60	
11	8	China	Chen Shiwei, Xie Zhenye, Yang Yang, Mo Youxue	38.83	SB
12	3	Saint Kitts and Nevis	Allistar Clarke, Jason Rogers, Antoine Adams, Brijesh Lawrence	39.07	
13	4	Poland	Remigiusz Olszewski, Dariusz Kuć, Jakub Adamski, Karol Zalewski	39.31	
	1	Australia	Jin Su Jung, Jarrod Geddes, Jake Hammond, Alexander Hartmann	DNF	
	5	Netherlands	Giovanni Codrington, Churandy Martina, Jorén Tromp, Hensley Paulina	DNF	
	2	Barbados		DNS	

=== Final ===
Rank	Lane	Nation	Athletes	Time	Notes	Points
1st place, gold medalist(s)	6	Jamaica	Nesta Carter, Nickel Ashmeade, Julian Forte, Yohan Blake	37.77		8
2nd place, silver medalist(s)	4	Trinidad and Tobago	Keston Bledman, Marc Burns, Rondel Sorrillo, Richard Thompson	38.04	SB	7
3rd place, bronze medalist(s)	5	Great Britain	Richard Kilty, Harry Aikines-Aryeetey, James Ellington, Dwain Chambers	38.19		6
4	8	Brazil	Bruno de Barros, Jefferson Lucindo, Aldemir da Silva Junior, Jorge Vides	38.40		5
5	2	Japan	Kazuma Oseto, Kei Takase, Yoshihide Kiryu, Shōta Iizuka	38.40		4
6	7	Canada	Gavin Smellie, Dontae Richards-Kwok, Jared Connaughton, Justyn Warner	38.55	SB	3
7	3	Germany	Aleixo-Platini Menga, Lucas Jakubczyk, Julian Reus, Martin Keller	38.69		2
	1	France		DNS		
