= Saint Kitts and Nevis at the 2011 Pan American Games =

- IOC code: SKN
- NOC: St. Kitts and Nevis Olympic Committee

in Guadalajara 14–30 October 2011
- Competitors: 6 in 1 sport
- Flag bearer: Antoine Adams
- Medals Ranked 22nd: Gold 0 Silver 2 Bronze 0 Total 2

Pan American Games appearances (overview)
- 1995; 1999; 2003; 2007; 2011; 2015; 2019; 2023

Saint Kitts and Nevis competed at the 2011 Pan American Games in Guadalajara, Mexico from October 14 to 30, 2011, sending six athletes, all of whom competed in athletics.

At the games Kim Collins won the Saint Kitts and Nevis' first ever medal at a Pan American Games.

== Medalists ==
Medal	Name	Sport	Event	Date
Silver	Kim Collins	Athletics	Men's 100 metres	October 25
Silver	Antoine Adams; Kim Collins; Delwayne Delaney; Brijesh Lawrence; Jason Rogers	Athletics	Men's 4 × 100 metres relay	October 28

== Athletics ==
Saint Kitts and Nevis qualified to send six athletes.

=== Men ===
Track and road events

Event	Athletes	Heats		Semifinal		Final	
Event	Athletes	Result	Rank	Result	Rank	Result	Rank
100 m	Kim Collins	10.36	9th Q	10.00 PR	1st Q	10.04	2nd place, silver medalist(s)
100 m	Jason Rogers	10.35	7th Q	10.44	10th	did not advance	
200 m	Brijesh Lawrence	21.02	17th Q	20.82	14th	did not advance	
200 m	Antoine Adams	20.83 SB	9th Q	20.76 PB	10th	did not advance	
4 × 100 m relay	Brijesh Lawrence; Antoine Adams; Jason Rogers; Kim Collins; Delwayne Delaney			39.31	2nd Q	38.81	2nd place, silver medalist(s)

=== Women ===
Track and road events

Event	Athlete	Semifinals		Final	
Event	Athlete	Result	Rank	Result	Rank
100 m	Tameka Williams	11.68	10th	did not advance	
200 m	Tameka Williams	23.25	3rd Q	23.06	4th
