= 2017 IAAF World Relays – Men's 4 × 200 metres relay =

Men's 4 × 200 metres relay at the 2017 IAAF World Relays
- Venue: Thomas Robinson Stadium
- Dates: 23 April
- Competitors: 61 from 14 nations
- Winning time: 1:19.42

Medalists
gold medal	Gavin Smellie; Brendon Rodney; Andre De Grasse; Aaron Brown	Canada
silver medal	Noah Lyles; Jarrion Lawson; Isiah Young; Ameer Webb	United States
bronze medal	Nickel Ashmeade; Oshane Bailey; Rasheed Dwyer; Yohan Blake; Chadic Hinds*; Warren Weir*	Jamaica

The men's 4 × 200 metres relay at the 2017 IAAF World Relays was held at the Thomas Robinson Stadium on 23 April.

Using the four turn stagger, teams were spread across the turn. The best relative judgement of progress is against the stagger. On the first leg, American Noah Lyles separated from Bahamas' Blake Bartlett to his inside and gained on China's Tang Xingqiang, while Canadian Gavin Smellie gained against Jamaican relay gold medalist Nickel Ashmeade to his outside. On the second leg, American Jarrion Lawson passed China's Mo Youxue, making USA look like the clear leader as the international broadcasters called the race. On the inside, Canadian Brendon Rodney had also passed Jamaica's Rasheed Dwyer. Canada put their star, triple Olympic medalist, Andre De Grasse on third leg. With USA the stagger leader on the outside, DeGrasse clearly was pulling away from everybody else and making up the gap to USA's Isiah Young. DeGrasse's leg was the first time the announcers noticed Canada. DeGrasse passed to Aaron Brown two steps ahead of the Americans pass to Ameer Webb. Brown held that advantage to the finish line, with the Jamaican team, anchored by Yohan Blake, the second fastest man in history, trailing the Americans by 15 meters.

== Records ==
Prior to the competition, the records were as follows:

World record	Jamaica (Nickel Ashmeade, Warren Weir, Jermaine Brown, Yohan Blake)	1:18.63	(The Bahamas) Nassau, Bahamas	24 May 2014
Championship record	Jamaica (Nickel Ashmeade, Warren Weir, Jermaine Brown, Yohan Blake)	1:18.63	(The Bahamas) Nassau, Bahamas	24 May 2014
World Leading	Canada (Bolade Ajomale; Brendon Rodney; Andre De Grasse; Aaron Brown)	1:19.91	Gainesville, United States	1 April 2017
African Record	South Africa (Marcus la Grange, Mathew Quinn, Josef van der Linde, Paul Gorries)	1:22.06	Port Elizabeth, South Africa	1 March 2002
Asian Record	(Japan) Waseda University	1:22.12	Yokohama, Japan	14 September 2014
North, Central American and Caribbean record	Jamaica (Nickel Ashmeade, Warren Weir, Jermaine Brown, Yohan Blake)	1:18.63	(The Bahamas) Nassau, Bahamas	24 May 2014
South American Record	Guyana (Adam Harris, Winston George, Jeremy Bascom, Stephan James)	1:24.42	Philadelphia, United States	25 April 2015
European Record	France (Christophe Lemaitre, Yannick Fonsat, Ben Bassaw, Ken Romain)	1:20.66	(The Bahamas) Nassau, Bahamas	24 May 2014
Oceanian record	Australia (Scott Vassella, Shem Hollands, Dean Capobianco, Peter Vassella)	1:23.04	Sydney, Australia	6 December 1998

== Schedule ==
Date	Time	Round
3 May 2014	19:00	Heats
3 May 2014	21:20	Final

All times are local times (UTC−4)

== Results ==
KEY:	q	Fastest non-qualifiers	Q	Qualified	WL	World leading	NR	National record	SB	Seasonal best

=== Heats ===
Qualification: First 2 of each heat (Q) plus the 2 fastest times (q) advanced to the final.

Rank	Heat	Lane	Nation	Athletes	Time	Notes
1	1	3	Canada	Gavin Smellie, Brendon Rodney, Andre De Grasse, Aaron Brown	1:21.11	Q
2	2	6	United States	Noah Lyles, Jarrion Lawson, Isiah Young, Ameer Webb	1:21.47	Q
3	1	4	Jamaica	Nickel Ashmeade, Chadic Hinds, Oshane Bailey, Warren Weir	1:22.01	Q, SB
4	1	2	Trinidad and Tobago	Kyle Greaux, Dan-Neil Telesford, Moriba Morain, Emmanuel Callender	1:22.79	Q, NR
5	1	7	Kenya	Mark Odhiambo, Mike Nyang'au, Peter Mwai Ndichu, Ferdinand Omurwa	1:23.04	q, SB
6	2	4	Bahamas	Adrian Griffith, Samson Colebrooke, Ian Kerr, Shavez Hart	1:23.71	Q, SB
7	2	2	China	Tang Xingqiang, Mo Youxue, Bie Ge, Liang Jinsheng	1:24.01	Q, SB
8	2	3	Antigua and Barbuda	Daniel Bailey, Richard Richardson, Jared Jarvis, Chavaughn Walsh	1:24.33	q, NR
9	1	6	Poland	Przemysław Słowikowski, Eryk Hampel, Artur Zaczek, Rafał Omelko	1:24.78	SB
10	2	7	Saint Kitts and Nevis	Lestrod Roland, Brijesh Lawrence, Delwayne Delaney, Allistar Clarke	1:24.89	SB
11	2	1	Venezuela	Luis Felipe Rodríguez, Alberto Aguilar, Omar Longart, Kelvis Padrino	1:25.69	NR
12	2	8	Turks and Caicos Islands	Ifeanyi Otuonye, Angelo Garland, Devante Gardiner, Frantzley Benjamin	1:26.22	NR
	2	5	France	Gautier Dautremer, Jeffrey John, Ken Romain, Ludvy Vaillant	DQ	163.3a
	1	5	Germany	Robin Erewa, Aleixo-Platini Menga, Maurice Huke, Michael Bryan	DNF	DNF
	1	8	United Kingdom		DNS	DNS

=== Final ===
The final was started at 21:36.

Rank	Lane	Nation	Athletes	Time	Notes	Points
1st place, gold medalist(s)	3	Canada	Gavin Smellie, Brendon Rodney, Andre De Grasse, Aaron Brown	1:19.42	WL	8
2nd place, silver medalist(s)	6	United States	Noah Lyles, Jarrion Lawson, Isiah Young, Ameer Webb	1:19.88	SB	7
3rd place, bronze medalist(s)	4	Jamaica	Nickel Ashmeade, Oshane Bailey, Rasheed Dwyer, Yohan Blake	1:21.09	SB	6
4	8	Trinidad and Tobago	Moriba Morain, Dan-Neil Telesford, Kyle Greaux, Emmanuel Callender	1:21.39	NR	5
5	5	Bahamas	Blake Bartlett, Samson Colebrooke, Ian Kerr, Shavez Hart	1:22.36	SB	4
6	7	China	Tang Xingqiang, Mo Youxue, Bie Ge, Liang Jinsheng	1:22.91	NR	3
7	1	Kenya	Mark Odhiambo, Mike Nyang'au, Peter Ndichu, Collins Gichana	1:23.72		2
8	2	Antigua and Barbuda	Daniel Bailey, Richard Richardson, Jared Jarvis, Tahir Walsh	1:25.11		1
