= 2014 IAAF World Relays – Men's 4 × 200 metres relay =

Men's 4 × 200 metres relay at the 2014 IAAF World Relays
- Venue: Thomas Robinson Stadium
- Dates: 24 May (heats & final)

The men's 4 × 200 metres relay at the 2014 IAAF World Relays was held at the Thomas Robinson Stadium on 24 May.

The rarity of this event at the elite level was evidenced by the poor handoffs. Apparently the athletes involved didn't know their exchange zones. Jermaine Brown came to a complete stop in the zone, and received the handoff from Warren Weir as he was being passed. Even with this ugly handoff, the Jamaican team still dominated the race and set a new world record. Their closest competitor was St. Kitts and Nevis, whose flaw had less of an effect on their performance, Brijesh Lawrence running on the inside of the turn, correctly put out his right hand to receive the baton, but incoming Lestrod Roland also had the baton in his right hand and had to make the handoff awkwardly across his body. For the American team, Ameer Webb looked completely confused, starting late, running out of his lane to the inside, then reaching to receive the baton before he had even entered the passing zone. Curtis Mitchell was not ready to pass that early and was moving too fast to make the exchange. Mitchell just stopped in frustration, the baton bouncing two lanes away, retrieved by Webb outside of the zone for a disqualification.

== Records ==
Prior to the competition, the records were as follows:

World record	(United States) Santa Monica Track Club (Michael Marsh, Leroy Burrell, Floyd Heard, Carl Lewis)	1:18.68	Walnut, California, United States	17 April 1994
Championship record	New event			
World Leading	University of Technology Jamaica	1:20.07	Philadelphia, United States	26 April 2014
African Record	South Africa (Marcus La Grange, Mathew Quinn, Josef van der Linde, Paul Gorries)	1:22.08	Port Elizabeth, South Africa	1 March 2002
Asian Record	Thailand (Reanchai Seerhawong, Vissanu Sophanich, Ekkachai Janthana, Sittichai Suwonpradeep)	1:22.66	Philadelphia, United States	29 April 2000
North, Central American and Caribbean record	(United States) Santa Monica Track Club (Michael Marsh, Leroy Burrell, Floyd Heard, Carl Lewis)	1:18.68	Walnut, California, United States	17 April 1994
South American Record	No official record			
European Record	Italy (Stefano Tilli, Carlo Simionato, Giovanni Bongiorni, Pietro Mennea)	1:21.10	Cagliari, Italy	29 September 1983
Oceanian record	No official record			

== Schedule ==
Date	Time	Round
24 May 2014	17:30	Heats
24 May 2014	19:52	Final

All times are local times (UTC−4)

== Results ==
KEY:	q	Fastest non-qualifiers	Q	Qualified	NR	National record	PB	Personal best	SB	Seasonal best

=== Heats ===
Qualification: First 3 of each heat (Q) plus the 2 fastest times (q) advanced to the final.

Rank	Heat	Lane	Nation	Athletes	Time	Notes
1	1	8	Jamaica	Rasheed Dwyer, Jermaine Brown, Jason Livermore, Warren Weir	1:20.15	Q
2	2	7	United States	Maurice Mitchell, Curtis Mitchell, Isiah Young, Wallace Spearmon	1:21.35	Q, SB
3	1	1	France	Christophe Lemaitre, Yannick Fonsat, Ben Bassaw, Ken Romain	1:21.45	Q, SB
4	2	5	Barbados	Ramon Gittens, Andrew Hinds, Shane Brathwaite, Fallon Forde	1:21.88	Q, NR
5	1	7	Saint Kitts and Nevis	Antoine Adams, Lestrod Roland, Brijesh Lawrence, Allistar Clarke	1:21.97	Q, NR
6	1	5	Bahamas	Blake Bartlett, Adrian Griffith, Wesley Neymour, Andretti Bain	1:22.18	q, NR
7	2	6	Kenya	Stephen Barasa, Carvin Nkanata, Walter Michuki Moenga, Tony Kipruto Chirchir	1:23.24	Q, NR
8	1	3	China	Chen Shiwei, Xie Zhenye, Yang Yang, Mo Youxue	1:23.75	q, NR
9	2	8	Japan	Yuichi Kobayashi, Masashi Eriguchi, Shinji Takahira, Kenji Fujimitsu	1:23.87	SB
10	2	3	Cayman Islands	Kemar Hyman, Tyrell Cuffy, David Hamil, Troy Long	1:24.91	NR
11	1	2	United States Virgin Islands	Tabarie Henry, Leslie Murray, David Walters, Leon Hunt	1:25.01	NR
	2	1	Nigeria	Elvis Ukale, Ogho-Oghene Egwero, Nicholas Imhoaperamhe, Isah Salihu	DNF	
	2	4	Germany	Julian Reus, Sebastian Ernst, Alexander Kosenkow, Robin Erewa	DNF	
	1	4	Spain	Sergio Ruiz, Iván Jesús Ramos, Adrià Burriel, Óscar Husillos	DQ	R170.7
	1	6	Papua New Guinea	Kupun Wisil, Theo Piniau, Kevin Kapmatana, Nelson Stone	DQ	R170.7
	2	2	Turks and Caicos Islands	Ifeanye Otuonye, Courtney Missick, Wadly Jean, Wesley Chery	DQ	R170.7

=== Final ===
Rank	Lane	Nation	Athletes	Time	Notes	Points
1st place, gold medalist(s)	3	Jamaica	Nickel Ashmeade, Warren Weir, Jermaine Brown, Yohan Blake	1:18.63	WR	8
2nd place, silver medalist(s)	8	Saint Kitts and Nevis	Antoine Adams, Lestrod Roland, Brijesh Lawrence, Allistar Clarke	1:20.51	NR	7
3rd place, bronze medalist(s)	5	France	Christophe Lemaitre, Yannick Fonsat, Ben Bassaw, Ken Romain	1:20.66	AR	6
4	4	Barbados	Ramon Gittens, Levi Cadogan, Andrew Hinds, Fallon Forde	1:21.88	=NR	5
5	7	Kenya	Stephen Barasa, Carvin Nkanata, Tony Kipruto Chirchir, Walter Michuki Moenga	1:22.35	NR	4
6	1	Bahamas	Blake Bartlett, Adrian Griffith, Wesley Neymour, Andretti Bain	1:23.19		3
7	2	China	Chen Shiwei, Xie Zhenye, Yang Yang, Mo Youxue	1:25.83		2
	6	United States	Maurice Mitchell, Curtis Mitchell, Ameer Webb, Wallace Spearmon	DQ	R170.7	
