= Athletics at the 2011 Pan American Games – Men's 200 metres =

Men's 200 metres at the 2011 Pan American Games
- Venue: Telmex Athletics Stadium
- Dates: October 26 – October 27
- Competitors: 32 from 23 nations

Medalists
Gold medal	Roberto Skyers	Cuba
Silver medal	Lansford Spence	Jamaica
Bronze medal	Bruno de Barros	Brazil

The men's 200 metres sprint competition of the athletics events at the 2011 Pan American Games took place between the 26 and 27 of October at the Telmex Athletics Stadium. The defending Pan American Games champion is Brendan Christian of Antigua and Barbuda.

== Records ==
Prior to this competition, the existing world and Pan American Games records were as follows:

World record	Usain Bolt (JAM)	19.19	Berlin, Germany	August 20, 2009
Pan American Games record	Don Quarrie (JAM)	19.86	Cali, Colombia	August 3, 1971

== Qualification ==
Each National Olympic Committee (NOC) was able to enter up to two entrants providing they had met the minimum standard (21.00) in the qualifying period (January 1, 2010 to September 14, 2011).

== Schedule ==
Date	Time	Round
October 26, 2011	15:00	Heats
October 26, 2011	16:55	Semifinals
October 27, 2011	18:50	Final

== Results ==
All times shown are in seconds.

KEY:	q	Fastest non-qualifiers	Q	Qualified	NR	National record	PB	Personal best	SB	Seasonal best

=== Heats ===
The first round were held on October 26. The first 4 in each heat (Q) and the next 4 fastest (q) qualify for the semifinals.

Wind:
Heat 1: +1.2, Heat 2: +0.8, Heat 3: +0.6, Heat 4: +0.4, Heat +0.2

Rank	Heat	Name	Nationality	Time	Notes
1	2	Bruno de Barros	Brazil	20.53	Q
2	1	Lansford Spence	Jamaica	20.59	Q
3	5	Sandro Viana	Brazil	20.65	Q
4	5	Jason Livermore	Jamaica	20.73	Q, SB
4	3	Álex Quiñónez	Ecuador	20.73	Q
6	2	Daniel Grueso	Colombia	20.76	Q, SB
7	4	Michael Mathieu	Bahamas	20.81	Q
8	5	Michael Herrera	Cuba	20.82	Q
9	5	Antoine Adams	Saint Kitts and Nevis	20.83	Q, SB
9	5	Cristián Reyes	Chile	20.83	q
11	4	Calesio Newman	United States	20.86	Q
11	1	Roberto Skyers	Cuba	20.86	Q
13	3	Moriba Morain	Trinidad and Tobago	20.90	Q
13	2	Rolando Palacios	Honduras	20.90	Q
15	3	José Acevedo	Venezuela	20.93	Q
16	4	Yoel Tapia	Dominican Republic	20.95	Q
17	2	Brijesh Lawrence	Saint Kitts and Nevis	21.02	Q
18	1	Harold Houston III	Bermuda	21.04	Q
18	1	Kael Becerra	Chile	21.04	Q
20	2	Perrisan White	United States	21.05	q
21	4	Dontae Richards	Canada	21.26	Q
22	1	Mariano Jimenez	Argentina	21.20	q
23	2	Franklin Nazareno	Ecuador	21.45	q
24	3	Juan Reyes	Mexico	21.54	Q
25	1	Joel Redhead	Grenada	21.60	
26	4	Jonathon Juin	Haiti	21.62	
27	3	Roudy Monrose	Haiti	21.63	
28	4	Jorge Alonzo	Mexico	21.81	
29	3	Courtney Carl Williams	Saint Vincent and the Grenadines	22.42	
30	5	Adam Harris	Guyana	22.45	
31	4	Jorge Jimenez	Belize	23.55	
32	3	Winston George	Guyana	24.17	

=== Semifinals ===
The semifinals were held on October 26. The first two in each heat (Q) and the next 2 fastest (q) qualify for the final.

Wind:
Heat 1: +0.2, Heat 2: +0.1, Heat 3: +0.5

Rank	Heat	Name	Nationality	Time	Notes
1	1	Roberto Skyers	Cuba	20.31	Q, SB
2	3	Lansford Spence	Jamaica	20.33	Q, PB
3	2	Bruno de Barros	Brazil	20.35	Q
4	1	Sandro Viana	Brazil	20.39	Q, SB
5	1	Álex Quiñónez	Ecuador	20.49	q, PB
6	3	Michael Mathieu	Bahamas	20.50	Q
7	1	Cristián Reyes	Chile	20.65	q, PB
8	3	Michael Herrera	Cuba	20.66	
9	2	Ronaldo Palacios	Honduras	20.70	Q, SB
10	1	Antoine Adams	Saint Kitts and Nevis	20.76	PB
10	2	Jason Livermore	Jamaica	20.76	
12	1	Perrisan White	United States	20.78	
13	3	Calesio Newman	United States	20.80	
14	3	Brijesh Lawrence	Saint Kitts and Nevis	20.82	
15	2	Daniel Grueso	Colombia	20.83	
16	3	Yoel Tapia	Dominican Republic	20.84	
17	2	José Acevedo	Venezuela	20.85	
18	1	Harold Houston III	Bermuda	20.91	PB
18	1	Moriba Morain	Trinidad and Tobago	20.91	
20	2	Dontae Richards	Canada	21.11	
21	2	Kael Becerra	Chile	21.23	
22	3	Mariano Jimenez	Argentina	21.47	
23	2	Franklin Nazareno	Ecuador	21.48	
24	3	Juan Reyes	Mexico	21.49	

=== Final ===
The final was held on October 27.

Wind: –1.0

Rank	Name	Nationality	Time	Notes
1st place, gold medalist(s)	Roberto Skyers	Cuba	20.37	
2nd place, silver medalist(s)	Lansford Spence	Jamaica	20.38	
3rd place, bronze medalist(s)	Bruno de Barros	Brazil	20.45	
4	Michael Mathieu	Bahamas	20.62	
5	Rolando Palacios	Honduras	20.77	
6	Álex Quiñónez	Ecuador	20.86	
7	Sandro Viana	Brazil	20.94	
8	Cristián Reyes	Chile	20.97	
