= Athletics at the 2011 Pan American Games – Men's 100 metres =

Men's 100 metres at the 2011 Pan American Games
- Venue: Telmex Athletics Stadium
- Dates: October 24 – October 25
- Competitors: 33 from 23 nations

Medalists
Gold medal	Lerone Clarke	Jamaica
Silver medal	Kim Collins	Saint Kitts and Nevis
Bronze medal	Emmanuel Callender	Trinidad and Tobago

The men's 100 metres sprint competition of the athletics events at the 2011 Pan American Games took place between the 24 and 25 of October at the Telmex Athletics Stadium. The defending Pan American Games champion was Churandy Martina formerly of the Netherlands Antilles. However, he did not defend his title as he has switched allegiance to the Netherlands.

Kim Collins won the silver medal, the first ever medal for Saint Kitts and Nevis at the Pan American Games.

== Records ==
Prior to this competition, the existing world and Pan American Games records were as follows:

World record	Usain Bolt (JAM)	9.58	Berlin, Germany	August 16, 2009
Pan American Games record	Leandro Peñalver (CUB)	10.06	Caracas, Venezuela	August 24, 1983
Pan American Games record	Churandy Martina (AHO)	10.06	Rio de Janeiro, Brazil	2007

== Qualification ==
Each National Olympic Committee (NOC) was able to enter up to two entrants providing they had met the minimum standard (10.38) in the qualifying period (January 1, 2010 to September 14, 2011).

== Schedule ==
Date	Time	Round
October 24, 2011	15:15	Heats
October 24, 2011	17:50	Semifinals
October 25, 2011	18:20	Final

== Results ==
All times shown are in seconds.

KEY:	q	Fastest non-qualifiers	Q	Qualified	NR	National record	PB	Personal best	SB	Seasonal best	DQ	Disqualified

=== Heats ===
Held on October 24. The first two in each heat and the next 6 six fastest advanced to the semifinals.

Wind:
Heat 1: -1.0, Heat 2: +1.2, Heat 3: -0.2, Heat 4: -2.0, Heat 5: -0.1

Rank	Heat	Name	Nationality	Time	Notes
1	2	Emmanuel Callender	Trinidad and Tobago	10.13	Q
2	5	Lerone Clarke	Jamaica	10.15	Q
3	2	Calesio Newman	United States	10.30	Q
4	3	Michael Herrera	Cuba	10.31	Q
5	5	Álvaro Gómez	Colombia	10.31	Q
6	1	Nilson André	Brazil	10.33	Q
7	5	Jason Rogers	Saint Kitts and Nevis	10.35	q PB
8	1	David Lescay	Cuba	10.36	Q
9	4	Kim Collins	Saint Kitts and Nevis	10.37	Q
10	5	Sandro Viana	Brazil	10.38	q
11	3	Tre Houston	Bermuda	10.40	Q
12	1	Oshane Bailey	Jamaica	10.41	q
13	3	Adrian Griffith	Bahamas	10.41	q
14	4	Carlos Jorge	Dominican Republic	10.43	Q
15	2	Jamial Rolle	Bahamas	10.45	q
16	4	Ramon Gittens	Barbados	10.45	q
17	1	Miguel Lopez	Puerto Rico	10.48	
18	1	Rolando Palacios	Honduras	10.49	SB
19	1	Kael Becerra	Chile	10.49	
20	2	Franklin Nazareno	Ecuador	10.52	
21	3	Monzavous Edwards	United States	10.53	
22	4	Isidro Montoya	Colombia	10.60	
23	5	Dontae Richards	Canada	10.61	
24	2	Adam Harris	Guyana	10.62	
25	3	Darrel Brown	Trinidad and Tobago	10.63	
26	5	Adrian Durant	Virgin Islands	10.64	PB
27	4	Lee Prowell	Guyana	10.65	
28	3	Miguel Wilken	Argentina	10.66	
29	2	Jorge Alonzo	Mexico	10.78	
30	4	Courtney Carl Williams	Saint Vincent and the Grenadines	11.15	
31	4	Jurgen Themen	Suriname	11.71	
32	1	Linford Avila	Belize	11.74	
	1	Juan Jose Reyes	Mexico	DQ	

=== Semifinals ===
Held on October 24. The top four in each heat advanced to the final.

Wind:
Heat 1: -1.9, Heat 2: +0.4

Rank	Heat	Name	Nationality	Time	Notes
1	2	Kim Collins	Saint Kitts and Nevis	10.00	Q PR
2	1	Lerone Clarke	Jamaica	10.17	Q
3	2	Emmanuel Callender	Trinidad and Tobago	10.17	Q
4	2	Nilson André	Brazil	10.23	Q
5	1	Carlos Jorge	Dominican Republic	10.30	Q
6	2	David Lescay	Cuba	10.31	Q
7	2	Ramon Gittens	Barbados	10.37	
8	1	Álvaro Gómez	Colombia	10.40	Q
9	1	Calesio Newman	United States	10.42	Q
10	1	Jason Rogers	Saint Kitts and Nevis	10.44	
11	2	Jamial Rolle	Bahamas	10.49	
12	1	Sandro Viana	Brazil	10.49	
13	1	Michael Herrera	Cuba	10.52	
14	1	Adrian Griffith	Bahamas	10.59	
	2	Oshane Bailey	Jamaica	DQ	
	2	Tre Houston	Bermuda	DQ	

=== Final ===
Held on October 25.

Wind: +0.2

Rank	Name	Nationality	Time	Notes
1st place, gold medalist(s)	Lerone Clarke	Jamaica	10.01	PB
2nd place, silver medalist(s)	Kim Collins	Saint Kitts and Nevis	10.04	
3rd place, bronze medalist(s)	Emmanuel Callender	Trinidad and Tobago	10.16	
4	Carlos Jorge	Dominican Republic	10.26	
5	Nilson André	Brazil	10.26	
6	Calesio Newman	United States	10.31	
7	Álvaro Gómez	Colombia	10.33	
8	David Lescay	Cuba	10.39	
