= Saint Kitts and Nevis at the 2019 Pan American Games =

- IOC code: SKN
- NOC: St. Kitts and Nevis Olympic Committee

in Lima, Peru 26 July–11 August, 2019
- Competitors: 4 in 1 sport
- Flag bearer: Jermaine Francis (opening)
- Medals: Gold 0 Silver 0 Bronze 0 Total 0

Pan American Games appearances (overview)
- 1995; 1999; 2003; 2007; 2011; 2015; 2019; 2023

Saint Kitts and Nevis competed at the 2019 Pan American Games in Lima, Peru from July 26 to August 11, 2019.

A total of four athletes (two per gender, and all in track and field) were named to the team in July 2019. The chef de mission of the team was Lester Hanley. During the opening ceremony of the games, high jumper Jermaine Francis carried the flag of the country as part of the parade of nations.

== Preparation ==
The St. Kitts and Nevis Olympic Committee financially assisted ten track and field athletes and two table tennis athletes in their quest for attaining qualification standards for the games. The country attempted to qualify in multiple sports, but the team size was smaller compared to four years prior in Toronto, Canada.

== Competitors ==
The following is the list of number of competitors (per gender) participating at the games per sport/discipline.

Sport	Men	Women	Total
Athletics (track and field)	2	2	4
Total	2	2	4

== Athletics (track and field) ==
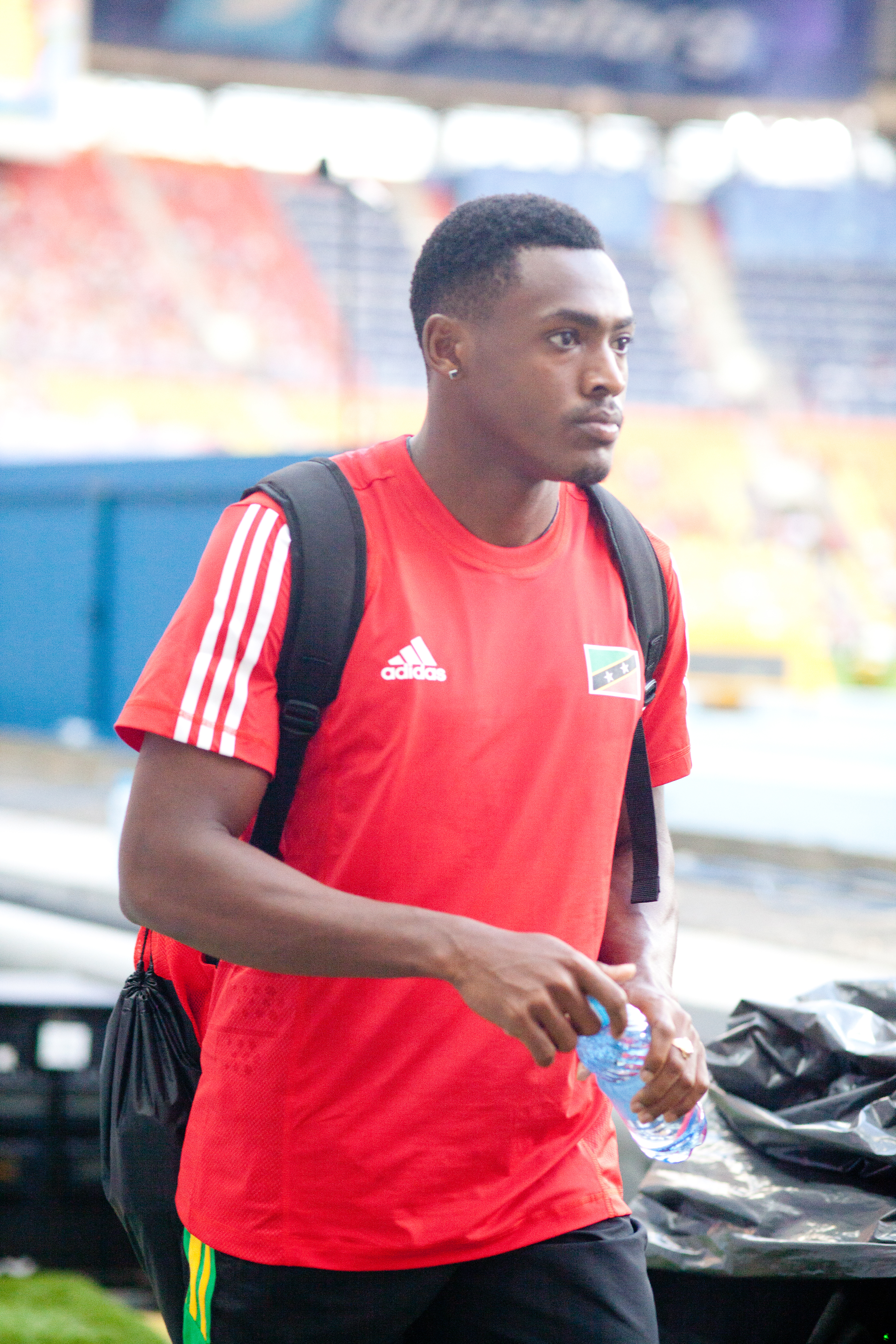
Jason Rogers had the country's highest placement, seventh in the 100 metres dash.

All four of Saint Kitts and Nevis' athletes competed in track and field.

Key

- Note–Ranks given for track events are for the entire round
- q = Qualified for the next round as a fastest loser
- SB = Seasonal best

Track events

Athlete	Event	Semifinals		Final	
Athlete	Event	Result	Rank	Result	Rank
Jason Rogers	Men's 100 m	10.36	7 q	10.40	7
Shenel Crooke	Women's 100 m	12.36	21	did not advance	
Reanda Richards	Women's 400 m hurdles	59.42	13	did not advance	

Field event

Athlete	Event	Final	
Athlete	Event	Distance	Position
Jermaine Francis	Men's high jump	2.10 SB	13
