= Athletics at the 2023 Pan American Games – Men's 200 metres =

Men's 200 metres at the 2023 Pan American Games
- Athletics pictogram
- Venue: Julio Martínez National Stadium
- Dates: November 1 – November 2
- Competitors: 18 from 15 nations
- Winning time: 20.37

Medalists
Gold medal	Renan Gallina	Brazil
Silver medal	José González	Dominican Republic
Bronze medal	Nadale Buntin	Saint Kitts and Nevis

The men's 200 metres competition of the athletics events at the 2023 Pan American Games was held on November 1 - 2 at the Julio Martínez National Stadium of Santiago, Chile.

== Records ==
Prior to this competition, the existing world and Pan American Games records were as follows:

World record	Usain Bolt (JAM)	19.19	Berlin, Germany	August 20, 2009
Pan American Games record	Rasheed Dwyer (JAM)	19.80	Toronto, Canada	July 23, 2015

== Schedule ==
Date	Time	Round
November 1, 2023	19:15	Semifinal
November 2, 2023	20:10	Final

== Results ==
=== Semifinal ===
Qualification: First 2 in each heat (Q) and next 2 fastest (q) qualified for the final.

==== Heat 1 ====
Rank	Lane	Athlete	Nation	Time	Notes
1	3	José González	Dominican Republic	20.81	Q
2	5	Nadale Buntin	Saint Kitts and Nevis	20.97	Q
3	4	Emanuel Archibald	Guyana	21.08	q
4	8	Andrae Dacres	Jamaica	21.38	
5	6	Enzo Faulbaum	Chile	21.55	
–	7	Evan Miller	United States	DQ	TR 17.3.1
				Wind: -0.2 m/s	

==== Heat 2 ====
Rank	Lane	Athlete	Nation	Time	Notes
1	7	Carlos Palacios	Colombia	21.11	Q
2	3	Callum Robinson	Canada	21.16	Q
3	6	Kyle Greaux	Trinidad and Tobago	21.27	q
4	5	Yancarlos Martínez	Dominican Republic	21.30	
5	8	César Ramírez	Mexico	21.67	
–	4	Shainer Reginfo	Cuba	DQ	TR 16.8
				Wind: -0.7 m/s	

==== Heat 3 ====
Rank	Lane	Athlete	Nation	Time	Notes
1	3	Renan Gallina	Brazil	20.39	Q
2	6	Alonso Edward	Panama	21.04	Q
3	8	Michael Sharp	Jamaica	21.31	
4	5	Jeremiah Lauzon	Canada	21.34	
5	7	Delan Edwin	Saint Lucia	21.62	
–	4	Anderson Marquinez	Ecuador	DQ	TR 17.3.1
				Wind: -0.6 m/s	

=== Final ===
The results were as follows

Rank	Lane	Name	Nationality	Time	Notes
1st place, gold medalist(s)	5	Renan Gallina	Brazil	20.37	
2nd place, silver medalist(s)	6	José González	Dominican Republic	20.56	
3rd place, bronze medalist(s)	7	Nadale Buntin	Saint Kitts and Nevis	20.79	
4	8	Callum Robinson	Canada	20.85	
5	4	Alonso Edward	Panama	21.01	
6	2	Kyle Greaux	Trinidad and Tobago	21.32	
7	1	Michael Sharp	Jamaica	21.35	
8	3	Emanuel Archibald	Guyana	21.38	
	–	Carlos Palacios	Colombia	DNS	
				Wind: +0.4 m/s	
