= Oshane Bailey =

Jamaican sprinter (born 1989)

Personal information
- Nationality: Jamaica
- Born: 8 September 1989 (age 36) Kingston, Jamaica
- Height: 1.68 m (5 ft 6 in)
- Weight: 73 kg (161 lb)8

Sport
- Sport: Running
- Event(s): 100 metres, 200 metres

Achievements and titles
- Personal best(s): 100 m: 10.11s(Miramar 2010); 200 m: 20.72 s (Mucurapo 2010)
Medal record
Representing Jamaica
Men's athletics
World Championships
Gold medal – first place	2013 Moscow	4 × 100 m relay
World Relay Championships
Bronze medal – third place	2017 Nassau	4 × 200 m relay
Commonwealth Games
Bronze medal – third place	2018 Gold Coast	4 × 100 m
NACAC Championships
Gold medal – first place	2015 Costa Rica	4 × 100 m relay
CAC Championships
Gold medal – first place	2011 Mayagüez	4 × 100 m relay
Silver medal – second place	2013 Morelia	4 × 100 m relay
CAC Games
Silver medal – second place	2010 Mayagüez	4 × 100 m relay
NACAC U-23 Championships
Silver medal – second place	2010 Miramar	100 meters
Silver medal – second place	2010 Miramar	4 × 100 meters
World Junior Championships
Silver medal – second place	2008 Bydgoszcz	4 × 100 m relay
CAC Junior Championships (U20)
Gold medal – first place	2006 Port of Spain	4 × 100 m relay
- Updated on 21 January 2015

Oshane Andre Bailey (born 8 September 1989) is a Jamaican sprinter, who specialises in the 100 and 200 meters. He is the 2010 Jamaica National Champion in the 100 m.

At the 2008 World Junior Championships in Athletics, Bailey helped the Jamaican squad to a silver medal in the 4 × 100 m relay.

At the 2010 Commonwealth games Bailey qualified for the final as a fastest loser, but had to pull out as his pulled his hamstring on the line in the semi-final.

Oshane "Country" Bailey qualified for Jamaicas 2013 World Championships team and was in the 4 × 100 m relay pool.

== Personal best ==
Distance	Time	venue
100 m	10.11 s (wind: +1.7 m/s)	Miramar, United States, 9 July 2010
200 m	20.66 s (wind: +0.9 m/s)	Kingston, Jamaica, 17 May 2014

== Competition record ==
Year	Competition	Venue	Position	Event	Notes
Representing Jamaica
2006	Central American and Caribbean; Junior Championships (U20)	Port of Spain, Trinidad and Tobago	1st	4 × 100 m	40.49
2008	World Junior Championships	Bydgoszcz, Poland	2nd	4 × 100 m	39.25
2010	NACAC Under-23 Championships	Miramar, United States	2nd	100 m	10.11 (+1.7 m/s)
2010	NACAC Under-23 Championships	Miramar, United States	2nd	4 × 100 m	39.36
2010	Central American and Caribbean Games	Mayagüez, Puerto Rico	4th	100 m	10.20 (+0.7 m/s)
2010	Central American and Caribbean Games	Mayagüez, Puerto Rico	2nd	4 × 100 m	38.78
2010	Commonwealth Games	Delhi, India	4th (sf)^{1}	100 m	10.20 (+0.9 m/s)
2011	Central American and Caribbean Championships	Mayagüez, Puerto Rico	4th	100 m	10.28 (-0.5 m/s)
2011	Central American and Caribbean Championships	Mayagüez, Puerto Rico	1st	4 × 100 m	38.81
2011	Pan American Games	Guadalajara, Mexico	12th (h)^{2}	100 m	10.41 A (-1.0 m/s)
2011	Pan American Games	Guadalajara, Mexico	—	4 × 100 m	DQ
2013	Central American and Caribbean Championships	Morelia, Mexico	11th (h)	100 m	10.30 A (+1.2 m/s)
2013	Central American and Caribbean Championships	Morelia, Mexico	2nd	4 × 100 m	38.86 A
2013	World Championships	Moscow, Russia	1st^{3}	4 × 100 m	38.17^{3}
2014	Pan American Sports Festival	Mexico City, Mexico	4th	100 m	10.39 A (-1.3 m/s)
2015	NACAC Championships	San José, Costa Rica	1st	4 × 100 m	38.07
2017	World Relays	Nassau, Bahamas	3rd	4 × 200 m	1:21.09
2018	Commonwealth Games	Gold Coast, Australia	13th (sf)	100 m	10.32
2018	Commonwealth Games	Gold Coast, Australia	3rd	4 × 100 m	38.35
2019	World Relays	Yokohama, Japan	–	4 × 200 m	DQ
2019	Pan American Games	Lima, Peru	9th (h)	100 m	10.43
2019	Pan American Games	Lima, Peru	5th	4 × 100 m relay	39.01
2019	World Championships	Doha, Qatar	11th (h)	4 × 100 m relay	38.15
2022	NACAC Championships	Freeport, Bahamas	7th	100 m	10.33

^{1}: Did not show in the final.
^{2}: Disqualified in the semifinal.
^{3}: Competed only in the heat.
