= 4 × 200 metres relay =

Athletics track event

The 4 × 200 metres relay is an athletics track event in which teams comprise four runners who each complete 200 metres or half a lap on a standard 400 metre track. The event is a world record eligible event, but is not a standard event at most professional or collegiate track meets, mainly being found at the high school level, though certain leagues regularly conduct this event as part of their program.

== Description ==
There are multiple formats under which the race can be conducted.

- If the track is marked for a four-turn stagger format, the runners can stay in their lanes throughout the race. In this case the outer lanes could appear to start 2/3 of the way through the first turn. The markings for such a special zone should be colored red, though many tracks deviate from the standard marking colors.
- On a conventionally marked track, the race can be run starting at the normal 400 metre (and 4 × 100 m relay) start line. As a two-turn stagger, the first exchange would take place in the standard second passing zone of the 4 × 100 m relay, the second pass taking place in the normal (lane one, extended) 4 × 400 m relay zone. After that exchange, the runner would break into lane one and make a third exchange in lane one of the second standard 4 × 100 m relay zone.
- Indoors, the event is popular because each leg is one lap of a standard 200 m indoor track.

The imperial distance analogue to the event is the 4 × 220 yards relay, contested at a total of 880 yards (804.672 m) which is slightly longer than the 800 m metric distance. It was contested at the AIAW Indoor Track and Field Championships and other American and British meets until the switch to metric in the 1980s.

== World record ==
The men's world record was set in 2014 at the inaugural IAAF World Relay Championships in Nassau, Bahamas. The record was set by a Jamaican team consisting of Nickel Ashmeade, Warren Weir, Jermaine Brown and Yohan Blake in a time of 1:18.63. The women's world record is 1:27.46, set by a squad called Team USA "Blue" LaTasha Jenkins, LaTasha Colander-Richardson, Nanceen Perry, and Marion Jones on April 29, 2000, at the Penn Relays in Philadelphia, Pennsylvania.

== European record ==
- Men Italy: 1:21.10 (Stefano Tilli, Carlo Simionato, Giovanni Bongiorni, Pietro Mennea), Cagliari 29 September 1983
- Women East Germany: 1:28.15 (Marlies Göhr, Romy Schneider-Müller, Bärbel Eckert-Wöckel, Marita Koch, Jena 9 August 1980

== All-time top 25 ==
=== Men ===
- Updated March 2020.

Rank	Time	Team	Nation	Date	Place	Ref.
1	1:18.63	Nickel Ashmeade, Warren Weir, Jermaine Brown, Yohan Blake	Jamaica	24 May 2014	Nassau	
2	1:18.68	Santa Monica Track Club; Michael Marsh, Leroy Burrell, Floyd Heard, Carl Lewis	United States	17 April 1994	Walnut	
3	1:19.10	World All Stars; Jon Drummond; Dennis Mitchell; Bryan Bridgewater; John Regis	United States; United States; United States; Great Britain	17 April 1994	Walnut	
4	1:19.11	Santa Monica Track Club; Michael Marsh, Leroy Burrell, Floyd Heard, Carl Lewis	United States	25 April 1992	Philadelphia	
5	1:19.20	Gavin Smellie, Brendon Rodney, Andre De Grasse, Aaron Brown	Canada	2 April 2016	Gainesville	
6	1:19.38	Santa Monica Track Club; Danny Everett, Leroy Burrell, Floyd Heard, Carl Lewis	United States	23 August 1989	Koblenz	
7	1:19.39	Jon Drummond, Shawn Crawford, Bernard Williams, Maurice Greene	United States	28 April 2001	Philadelphia	
8	1:19.42	Gavin Smellie, Brendon Rodney, Andre De Grasse, Aaron Brown	Canada	23 April 2017	Nassau	
9	1:19.45	Santa Monica Track Club; Joe DeLoach, Leroy Burrell, Carl Lewis, Floyd Heard	United States	27 April 1991	Philadelphia	
10	1:19.47	Kenny Brokenburr, Alvin Harrison, Maurice Greene, Michael Johnson	United States	24 April 1999	Philadelphia	
11	1:19.62	Shawn Crawford, Mickey Grimes, Darvis Patton, Justin Gatlin	United States	24 April 2004	Philadelphia	
12	1:19.67	Texas Christian University; Lindel Frater; Ricardo Williams; Darvis Patton; Kim Collins	Jamaica; Jamaica; United States; Saint Kitts and Nevis	29 April 2000	Philadelphia	
13	1:19.71	Texas Christian University; Lindel Frater; Steve Slowly; Darvis Patton; Kim Collins	Jamaica; Jamaica; United States; Saint Kitts and Nevis	27 April 2001	Philadelphia	
14	1:19.73	Christopher Belcher, Bryce Robinson, Vernon Norwood, Remontay McClain	United States	12 May 2019	Yokohama	
15	1:19.85	Nike International; Maurice Greene, Allen Johnson, Alvin Harrison, Michael Johnson	United States	25 April 1998	Philadelphia	
16	1:19.88	Austin All-Stars; Obadele Thompson; Rodrigue Nordin; Vincent Henderson; Rohsaan Griffin	Barbados; France; United States; United States	3 April 1999	Austin	
16	1:19.88	Noah Lyles, Jarrion Lawson, Isiah Young, Ameer Webb	United States	23 April 2017	Nassau	
18	1:19.91	Hudson Smith International; Curtis Perry; Jon Drummond; Ato Boldon; Maurice Greene	United States; United States; Trinidad and Tobago; United States	3 April 1999	Austin	
18	1:19.91	Bolade Ajomale, Brendon Rodney, Andre De Grasse, Aaron Brown	Canada	1 April 2017	Gainesville	
20	1:19.92	Nike International; Kenny Brokenburr, Bryan Howard, Rohsaan Griffin, Maurice Greene	United States	29 April 2000	Philadelphia	
21	1:19.99	Texas Christian University; Lindel Frater; Steve Slowly; Darvis Patton; Kim Collins	Jamaica; Jamaica; United States; Saint Kitts and Nevis	28 April 2001	Philadelphia	
22	1:20.07	University of Technology Jamaica; Dantago Gurirab; Julian Forte; Andrew Fisher; Ronald Levy	Namibia; Jamaica; Jamaica; Jamaica	26 April 2014	Philadelphia	
23	1:20.12	Christopher Belcher, Bryce Robinson, Vernon Norwood, Remontay McClain	United States	12 May 2019	Yokohama	
24	1:20.15	Rasheed Dwyer, Jermaine Brown, Jason Livermore, Warren Weir	Jamaica	24 May 2014	Nassau	
25	1:20.17	Gavin Smellie, Aaron Brown, Brendon Rodney, Andre De Grasse	Canada	30 Mar 2019	Gainesville	

A USA team of Shawn Crawford, Ramon Clay, Darvis Patton and Justin Gatlin ran 1:19.16 at the Penn Relays in Philadelphia on 26 April 2003 but the performance was annulled due to the use of performance enhancing drugs by Ramon Clay

=== Women ===
- Updated April 2024.

Rank	Time	Team	Nation	Date	Place	Ref.
1	1:27.05	Team International; Dina Asher-Smith; Rhasidat Adeleke; Lanae-Tava Thomas; Julien Alfred	Great Britain; Ireland; Jamaica; Saint Lucia	30 March 2024	Austin	
2	1:27.46	LaTasha Jenkins; LaTasha Colander-Richardson; Nanceen Perry; Marion Jones	United States	29 April 2000	Philadelphia	
3	1:28.05	University of Texas; Rhasidat Adeleke; Julien Alfred; Kevona Davis; Lanae Thomas	Ireland; Saint Lucia; Jamaica; United States	1 April 2023	Austin	
4	1:28.15	Marlies Göhr; Romy Schneider-Müller; Bärbel Eckert-Wöckel; Marita Koch	East Germany	9 August 1980	Jena	
5	1:28.77	Tumbleweed Track Club; Desiree Henry; Anyika Onuora; Tianna Bartoletta; Dafne Schippers	Great Britain; Great Britain; United States; Netherlands	1 April 2017	Gainesville	
5	1:28.77	Pure Athletics; Kelly Ann Baptiste; Shakima Wimbley; Tori Bowie; Samantha Henry-Robinson	Trinidad and Tobago; United States; United States; Jamaica	31 March 2018	Gainesville	
7	1:28.78	University of Oregon; Makenzie Dunmore, Hannah Cunliffe, Deajah Stevens, Ariana Washington	United States	1 April 2017	Gainesville	
8	1:29.03	University of Texas; Rhasidat Adeleke; Kynnedy Flannel; Julien Alfred; Kevona Davis	Ireland; United States; Saint Lucia; United States	26 March 2022	Austin	
9	1:29.04	Jura Levy, Shericka Jackson, Shashalee Forbes, Elaine Thompson	Jamaica	22 April 2017	Nassau	
10	1:29.25	Pure Athletics; Kelly Ann Baptiste; Shakima Wimbley; Desirèe Henry; Shaunae Miller-Uibo	Trinidad and Tobago; United States; Great Britain; Bahamas	30 March 2019	Gainesville	
11	1:29.42	Texas A&M University; Jeneba Tarmoh, Gabby Mayo, Jessica Beard, Porscha Lucas	United States	24 April 2010	Philadelphia	
12	1:29.45	Shalonda Solomon, Tawanna Meadows, Bianca Knight, Kimberlyn Duncan	United States	25 May 2014	Nassau	
13	1:29.61	Desiree Henry, Anyika Onuora, Bianca Williams, Asha Philip	Great Britain	25 May 2014	Nassau	
14	1:29.64 (Note: World Athletics report this as 1:29.24, however, contemporary newspapers and www.pennrelaysonline.com show 1:29.64)	Nike International; Tameka Roberts, Inger Miller, Nicole Green, Marion Jones	United States	25 April 1998	Philadelphia	
15	1:29.71	Pure Athletics; Hanna-Maari Latvala; Shaunae Miller; Kelly Ann Baptiste; Tori Bowie	Finland; Bahamas; Trinidad and Tobago; United States	1 April 2017	Gainesville	
16	1:29.78	Louisiana State University; Nadia Davy; Monique Hall; Stephanie Durst; Muna Lee	Jamaica; United States; United States; United States	26 April 2003	Philadelphia	
17	1:29.86	Empire Athletics; Shalonda Solomon, Francena McCorory, Charonda Williams, Felicia Brown	United States	1 April 2017	Gainesville	
18	1:29.89	Texas A&M University; Diamond Spaulding; Brenessa Thompson; Jaevin Reed; Danyel White	United States; Guyana; United States; United States	1 April 2017	Austin	
19	1:29.96	Texas A&M University; LaKeidra Stewart, Ashley Collier, Jessica Beard, Dominique Duncan (Note: Duncan transferred from USA to NGR in 2014)	United States	30 April 2011	Philadelphia	
20	1:29.98	Texas A&M University; Ashton Purvis, Ashley Collier, Olivia Ekpone (Note: Ekpone transferred from USA to NGR in 2015), Kamaria Brown	United States	27 April 2013	Philadelphia	
21	1:30.01	Angela Daigle, Debbie Dunn, Julian Clay, Shaunta Pelham	United States	24 April 2004	Philadelphia	
21	1:30.01	Louisiana State University; Cassandra Tate; Semoy Hackett; Rebecca Alexander; Kimberlyn Duncan	United States; Trinidad and Tobago; United States; United States	31 March 2012	Austin	
23	1:30.04	Simone Facey, Sheri-Ann Brooks, Anneisha McLaughlin, Shelly-Ann Fraser-Pryce	Jamaica	25 May 2014	Nassau	
24	1:30.07	Louisiana State University; Nadia Davy; Monique Hall; Stephanie Durst; Muna Lee	United States; Nigeria; United States; United States	5 April 2003	Austin	
25	1:30.20	Nike International; Celena Mondie-Milner, Nicole Green, Chryste Gaines, Inger Miller	United States	26 April 1997	Philadelphia	
