= Athletics at the 2019 Pan American Games – Men's 100 metres =

Men's 100 metres at the 2019 Pan American Games
- Venue: Athletics Stadium
- Dates: August 6 – August 7
- Competitors: 24 from 16 nations
- Winning time: 10.09

Medalists
Gold medal	Mike Rodgers; United States
Silver medal	Paulo de Oliveira; Brazil
Bronze medal	Cejhae Greene; Antigua and Barbuda

The men's 100 metres competition of the athletics events at the 2019 Pan American Games will take place between the 6 and 7 of August at the 2019 Pan American Games Athletics Stadium. The defending Pan American Games champion is Andre De Grasse from Canada.

== Records ==
Prior to this competition, the existing world and Pan American Games records were as follows:

World record	Usain Bolt (JAM)	9.58	Berlin, Germany	August 16, 2009
Pan American Games record	Kim Collins (SKN)	10.00	Guadalajara, Mexico	October 24, 2011

== Schedule ==
Date	Time	Round
August 6, 2019	15:35	Semifinal
August 7, 2019	16:52	Final

== Results ==
All times shown are in seconds.

KEY:	q	Fastest non-qualifiers	Q	Qualified	NR	National record	PB	Personal best	SB	Seasonal best	DQ	Disqualified

=== Semifinal ===
Qualification: First 2 in each heat (Q) and next 2 fastest (q) qualified for the final. The results were as follows:

Wind:
Heat 1: +0.3 m/s, Heat 2: +0.3 m/s, Heat 3: -0.3 m/s

Rank	Heat	Name	Nationality	Time	Notes
1	2	Rodrigo do Nascimento	Brazil	10.27	Q
2	3	Paulo de Oliveira	Brazil	10.29	Q
3	2	Mike Rodgers	United States	10.29	Q
4	1	Cejhae Greene	Antigua and Barbuda	10.31	Q
5	3	Rasheed Dwyer	Jamaica	10.32	Q
6	1	Cravon Gillespie	United States	10.32	Q
7	1	Jason Rogers	Saint Kitts and Nevis	10.36	q
8	1	Keston Bledman	Trinidad and Tobago	10.40	q
9	1	Oshane Bailey	Jamaica	10.43	
10	3	Gavin Smellie	Canada	10.43	
11	1	Reynier Mena	Cuba	10.43	
11	1	Jhonny Rentería	Colombia	10.43	
13	2	Kemar Hyman	Cayman Islands	10.44	
14	3	Mario Burke	Barbados	10.46	
15	3	Christopher Valdez	Dominican Republic	10.51	
16	1	Mobolade Ajomale	Canada	10.54	
17	3	Akanni Hislop	Trinidad and Tobago	10.60	
18	2	Emanuel Archibald	Guyana	10.60	
19	2	Mayovanex de Oleo	Dominican Republic	10.61	
20	2	Warren Fraser	Bahamas	10.62	
21	3	Diego Palomeque	Colombia	10.65	
22	2	Enrique Polanco	Chile	10.69	
23	3	Andy Martínez	Peru	10.81	
	2	Harlyn Pérez	Cuba	DSQ	

=== Final ===
The results were as follows:

Wind: -0.5 m/s

Rank	Lane	Name	Nationality	Time	Notes
1st place, gold medalist(s)	7	Mike Rodgers	United States	10.09	
2nd place, silver medalist(s)	5	Paulo de Oliveira	Brazil	10.16	
3rd place, bronze medalist(s)	6	Cejhae Greene	Antigua and Barbuda	10.23	
4	4	Rodrigo do Nascimento	Brazil	10.27	
5	8	Rasheed Dwyer	Jamaica	10.32	
6	9	Cravon Gillespie	United States	10.38	
7	2	Jason Rogers	Saint Kitts and Nevis	10.40	
8	3	Keston Bledman	Trinidad and Tobago	10.43	
