= David Lescay =

Cuban sprinter

Personal information
- Born: 29 February 1989

Sport
- Sport: Athletics
- Event(s): 100 m, 200 m

David Lescay (born 19 February 1989) is a retired Cuban sprinter. He represented his country at the 2010 World Indoor Championships without advancing from the first round.

== International competitions ==
Year	Competition	Venue	Position	Event	Notes
Representing Cuba
2007	ALBA Games	Caracas, Venezuela	3rd	200 m	20.97
2007	ALBA Games	Caracas, Venezuela	1st	4 × 100 m relay	39.23
2008	World Junior Championships	Bydgoszcz, Poland	6th	100 m	10.71
2008	World Junior Championships	Bydgoszcz, Poland	9th (sf)	200 m	21.32
2009	Central American and Caribbean Championships	Havana, Cuba	8th	100 m	10.33
2009	Central American and Caribbean Championships	Havana, Cuba	–	4 × 100 m relay	DNF
2010	World Indoor Championships	Doha, Qatar	27th (h)	60 m	6.79
2011	ALBA Games	Barquisimeto, Venezuela	1st	100 m	10.28
2011	ALBA Games	Barquisimeto, Venezuela	1st	4 × 100 m relay	39.34
2011	ALBA Games	Barquisimeto, Venezuela	2nd	4 × 400 m relay	3:05.75
2011	Pan American Games	Guadalajara, Mexico	8th	100 m	10.39
2011	Pan American Games	Guadalajara, Mexico	4th	4 × 100 m relay	39.75

== Personal bests ==
Outdoor

- 100 metres – 10.20 (+1.5 m/s, Havana 2009)
- 200 metres – 20.83 (-0.9 m/s, Havana 2009)

Indoor

- 60 metres – 6.79 (Doha 2010)
