= Athletics at the 2011 Pan American Games – Men's 4 × 100 metres relay =

Men's 4 x 100 metres relay at the 2011 Pan American Games
- Venue: Telmex Athletics Stadium
- Dates: October 27 – October 28
- Competitors: 60 from 14 nations

Medalists
Gold medal	Ailson Feitosa, Sandro Viana, Nilson André, Bruno de Barros, Carlos Moraes Junior, Matheus Facho Inocêncio	Brazil
Silver medal	Jason Rogers, Antoine Adams, Delwayne Delaney, Brijesh Lawrence	Saint Kitts and Nevis
Bronze medal	Calesio Newman, Jeremy Dodson, Rubin Williams, Monzavous Edwards, Perrisan White	United States

The men's 4 x 100 metres relay competition of the athletics events at the 2011 Pan American Games took place on the 27 and 28 October at the Telmex Athletics Stadium. The defending Pan American Games champion were Vicente de Lima, Rafael Ribeiro, Basílio de Moraes Júnior and Sandro Viana of Brazil.

== Records ==
Prior to this competition, the existing world and Pan American Games records were as follows:

World record	Jamaica	37.04	Daegu, South Korea	September 4, 2011
Pan American Games record	Brazil	38.18	Winnipeg, Canada	July 30, 1999

== Qualification ==
Each National Olympic Committee (NOC) was able to enter one team.

== Schedule ==
Date	Time	Round
October 27, 2011	14:45	Semifinals
October 28, 2011	18:00	Final

== Results ==
All times shown are in seconds.

KEY:	q	Fastest non-qualifiers	Q	Qualified	NR	National record	PB	Personal best	SB	Seasonal best	DQ	Disqualified

=== Semifinals ===
The semifinals were held on October 27. Qualification: First 3 teams of each heat (Q) plus the next 2 fastest (q) qualified for the final.

Rank	Heat	Nation	Athletes	Time	Notes
1	1	United States	Jeremy Dodson, Perrisan White, Rubin Williams, Monzavous Edwards	39.19	Q
2	1	Saint Kitts and Nevis	Jason Rogers, Antoine Adams, Delwayne Delaney, Brijesh Lawrence	39.31	Q
3	1	Brazil	Carlos Moraes Junior, Ailson Feitosa, Nilson André, Matheus Facho Inocêncio	39.44	Q
4	2	Chile	Ignacio Rojas, Cristián Reyes, Kael Becerra, Daniel Pineda	39.68	Q, NR
5	2	Cuba	David Lescay, Michael Herrera, Víctor González, Roberto Skyers	39.79	Q
6	1	Bahamas	Chris Brown, Jamial Rolle, Rodney Green, Wesley Neymour	40.05	q
7	2	Ecuador	Luis Morán, Franklin Nazareno, Álex Quiñónez, Hugo Chila	40.23	Q, SB
8	2	Mexico	Miguel Hernández, Jorge Alonzo, Juan Jose Reyes, José Luis Ceballos	40.74	q
	1	Belize	Kenneth Medwood, Jayson Jones, Linford Avila, Kenneth Brackett	DNF	
	1	Colombia	Isidro Montoya, Daniel Grueso, Geiner Mosquera, Álvaro Gómez	DNF	
	1	Puerto Rico	Marcos Amalbert, Carlos Rodríguez, Marquis Holston, Miguel López	DNF	
	2	Honduras	Helson Pitillo, Ronald Bennett, Josef Norales, Rolando Palacios	DNF	
	2	Trinidad and Tobago	Jamol James, Moriba Morain, Joel Dillon, Emmanuel Callander	DNF	
	2	Jamaica	Jermaine Hamilton, Jason Livermore, Hannukkah Wallace, Oshane Bailey	DSQ	

=== Final ===
Held on October 28.

Rank	Nation	Athletes	Time	Notes
1st place, gold medalist(s)	Brazil	Ailson Feitosa, Sandro Viana, Nilson André, Bruno de Barros	38.18	=PR
2nd place, silver medalist(s)	Saint Kitts and Nevis	Jason Rogers, Antoine Adams, Delwayne Delaney, Brijesh Lawrence	38.81	
3rd place, bronze medalist(s)	United States	Calesio Newman, Jeremy Dodson, Rubin Williams, Monzavous Edwards	39.17	
4	Cuba	David Lescay, Michael Herrera, Víctor González, Roberto Skyers	39.75	
5	Ecuador	Jhon Tamayo, Franklin Nazareno, Álex Quiñónez, Hugo Chila	39.76	SB
6	Mexico	Miguel Hernández, Jorge Alonzo, Juan Jose Reyes, José Luis Ceballos	41.08	
	Chile	Ignacio Rojas, Cristián Reyes, Kael Becerra, Daniel Pineda	DNF	
	Bahamas		DNS	
