= Saint Kitts and Nevis at the 1999 Pan American Games =

- IOC code: SKN
- NOC: St. Kitts and Nevis Olympic Committee

in Winnipeg, Canada 23 July–8 August, 1999
- Competitors: 1 in 1 sport
- Medals: Gold 0 Silver 0 Bronze 0 Total 0

Pan American Games appearances (overview)
- 1995; 1999; 2003; 2007; 2011; 2015; 2019; 2023

Saint Kitts and Nevis competed at the 1999 Pan American Games in Winnipeg, Manitoba, Canada from July 23 to August 8, 1999. The team consisted of just one athlete, in track and field.

== Competitors ==
The following is the list of number of competitors (per gender) participating at the games per sport/discipline.

Sport	Men	Women	Total
Athletics (track and field)	1	0	1
Total	1	0	1

== Athletics (track and field) ==
Saint Kitts and Nevis entered one male athlete in the triple jump event. Lloyd Browne finished in seventh place.

Key

- Note–Ranks given for track events are for the entire round

Men
Field event

Athlete	Event	Final	
Athlete	Event	Distance	Position
Lloyd Browne	Triple jump	15.43	7

== See also ==
- Saint Kitts and Nevis at the 2000 Summer Olympics
