= Saint Kitts and Nevis at the 2007 Pan American Games =

- IOC code: SKN
- NOC: St. Kitts and Nevis Olympic Committee

in Rio de Janeiro 13–29 July 2007
- Competitors: 29
- Flag bearer: Roatter Johnson
- Medals: Gold 0 Silver 0 Bronze 0 Total 0

Pan American Games appearances (overview)
- 1995; 1999; 2003; 2007; 2011; 2015; 2019; 2023

The 15th Pan American Games were held in Rio de Janeiro, Brazil from 13 July to 29 July 2007.

== See also ==
- Saint Kitts and Nevis at the 2008 Summer Olympics
