= Saint Kitts and Nevis at the 2023 Pan American Games =

- IOC code: SKN
- NOC: St. Kitts and Nevis Olympic Committee

in Santiago, Chile 20 October 2023 – 5 November 2023
- Competitors: 5 in 2 sports
- Flag bearers (opening): Nadale Buntin & Arina Valitova
- Flag bearer (closing): Hakeem Huggins
- Medals Ranked =31st: Gold 0 Silver 0 Bronze 1 Total 1

Pan American Games appearances (overview)
- 1995; 1999; 2003; 2007; 2011; 2015; 2019; 2023

Saint Kitts and Nevis competed at the 2023 Pan American Games in Santiago, Chile from October 20 to November 5, 2023. This was Saint Kitts and Nevis's 8th appearance at the Pan American Games, having competed at every edition of the Games since 1995.

The Saint Kitts and Nevis team consisted of five athletes (four men and one woman) competing in two spots: athletics (track and field) and tennis. Sprinter Nadale Buntin and tennis athlete Arina Valitova were the country's flagbearers during the opening ceremony. Meanwhile, track athlete Hakeem Huggins was the country's flagbearer during the closing ceremony.

The country won one medal, a bronze by Nadale Buntin in the men's 200 metres track and field event.

== Medalists ==
The following Saint Kitts and Nevis competitors won medals at the games. In the by discipline sections below, medalists' names are bolded.

Medal	Name	Sport	Event	Date
Bronze	Nadale Buntin	Athletics	Men's 200 m	November 2

== Competitors ==
The following is the list of number of competitors (per gender) participating at the games per sport/discipline.

Sport	Men	Women	Total
Athletics (track and field)	4	0	4
Tennis	0	1	1
Total	4	1	5

== Athletics (track and field) ==
Saint Kitts and Nevis qualified four male track and field athletes.

Key

- Note–Ranks given for track events are within the athlete's heat only
- **Q** = Qualified for the next round
- **q** = Qualified for the next round as a fastest loser
- Bye = Athlete not required to compete in round

Men
Track and road events

Athlete	Event	Semifinals		Final	
Athlete	Event	Result	Rank	Result	Rank
Hakeem Huggins	100 m	10.54	14	Did not advance	
**Nadale Buntin**	200 m	20.97	3 **Q**	20.79	3rd place, bronze medalist(s)
Nadale Buntin; Warren Hazel; Hakeem Huggins; Royden Peets	4 × 100 m relay	39.93	9	Did not advance	

== Tennis ==
The Saint Kitts and Nevis qualified one female tennis player. This marked the country's first Pan American Games participation outside the sport of athletics.

Women

Athlete	Event	Round of 64	Round of 32	Round of 16	Quarterfinals	Semifinals	Final / BM	
Athlete	Event	Opposition Score	Opposition Score	Opposition Score	Opposition Score	Opposition Score	Opposition Score	Rank
Arina Valitova	Singles	Alarcón (PER); **L** 0–2 (0–6, 2–6)	Did not advance					

== See also ==
- Saint Kitts and Nevis at the 2024 Summer Olympics
