= José González (Dominican athlete) =

Dominican Republic sprinter (born 1995)

Personal information
- Full name: José Alnardo González Soto
- Nationality: Dominican Republic
- Born: 14 May 1995 (age 31)

Sport
- Sport: Athletics
- Events: 100 metres; 200 metres; 4 × 100 metres relay

Achievements and titles
- Personal bests: 100m: 10.04 (2023 NR); 200m: 20.24 (2023)
Medal record
Representing Dominican Republic
Men's athletics
Pan American Games
Gold medal – first place	2023 Santiago	100 m
Silver medal – second place	2023 Santiago	200 m
Ibero-American Championships
Gold medal – first place	2024 Cuiabá	200 m
Silver medal – second place	2022 Alicante	4×100 m relay
Silver medal – second place	2024 Cuiabá	100 m
Silver medal – second place	2026 Lima	4×100 m relay
Bronze medal – third place	2026 Lima	100 m
Bronze medal – third place	2026 Lima	200 m
Central American and Caribbean Games
Silver medal – second place	2023 San Salvador	100 m
Silver medal – second place	2023 San Salvador	4×100 m relay

José Alnardo González Soto (born 14 May 1995) is a Dominican Republic sprinter. He won the 100 metres at the 2023 Pan American Games in addition to a silver medal in the 200 metres.

== Personal bests ==
Outdoor

- 100 metres – 10.04 (Fort-de-France 2023) NR
- 200 metres – 20.24 (Fort-de-France 2023)
