= Athletics at the 2023 Pan American Games – Men's 100 metres =

Men's 100 metres at the 2023 Pan American Games
- Venue: Julio Martínez National Stadium
- Dates: October 30 – October 31
- Competitors: 22 from 16 nations
- Winning time: 10.30

Medalists
| Gold medal | José González | Dominican Republic |
| Silver medal | Felipe Bardi | Brazil |
| Bronze medal | Emanuel Archibald | Guyana |

The men's 100 metres competition of the athletics events at the 2023 Pan American Games was held on October 30 - 31 at the Julio Martínez National Stadium of Santiago, Chile.

== Records ==
Prior to this competition, the existing world and Pan American Games records were as follows:

| World record | Usain Bolt (JAM) | 9.58 | Berlin, Germany | August 16, 2009 |
| Pan American Games record | Kim Collins (SKN) | 10.00 | Guadalajara, Mexico | October 24, 2011 |

== Schedule ==
| Date | Time | Round |
|---|---|---|
| October 30, 2023 | 18:35 | Semifinal |
| October 31, 2023 | 21:03 | Final |

== Results ==
=== Semifinal ===
Qualification: First 2 in each heat (Q) and next 2 fastest (q) qualified for the final. The results were as follows:

==== Heat 1 ====
| Rank | Lane | Athlete | Nation | Time | Notes |
|---|---|---|---|---|---|
| 1 | 6 | José González | Dominican Republic | 10.30 | Q |
| 2 | 3 | Felipe Bardi | Brazil | 10.33 | Q |
| 3 | 4 | Emanuel Archibald | Guyana | 10.35 | q |
| 4 | 5 | Odaine McPherson | Jamaica | 10.37 | q |
| 5 | 2 | Brandon Letts | Canada | 10.51 | |
| 6 | 7 | Franco Florio | Argentina | 10.52 | |
| 7 | 1 | Hakeem Huggins | Saint Kitts and Nevis | 10.54 | |
| | | | | Wind: -0.1 m/s | |

==== Heat 2 ====
| Rank | Lane | Athlete | Nation | Time | Notes |
|---|---|---|---|---|---|
| 1 | 3 | Erik Cardoso | Brazil | 10.43 | Q |
| 2 | 4 | Diego Andre Gonzalez | Puerto Rico | 10.50 | Q |
| 3 | 2 | Norris Spike | Canada | 10.51 | |
| 4 | 6 | Jevaughn Whyte | Jamaica | 10.52 | |
| 5 | 7 | Enrique Polanco | Chile | 10.57 (.566) | |
| 6 | 1 | Arturo Deliser | Panama | 10.57 (.568) | |
| 7 | 5 | Samson Colebrooke | Bahamas | 10.62 | |
| | | | | Wind: +0.1 m/s | |

==== Heat 3 ====
| Rank | Lane | Athlete | Nation | Time | Notes |
|---|---|---|---|---|---|
| 1 | 8 | Shainer Reginfo | Cuba | 10.36 | Q, SB |
| 2 | 4 | Alonso Edward | Panama | 10.37 | Q, SB |
| 3 | 6 | Christopher Royster | United States | 10.38 | |
| 4 | 2 | Jerod Elcock | Trinidad and Tobago | 10.58 | |
| 5 | 5 | Melbin Marcelino | Brazil | 10.59 | |
| 6 | 1 | Darren Morgan-Jeffers | Saint Vincent and the Grenadines | 11.06 | |
| 7 | 7 | Paulo André de Oliveira | Brazil | 49.83 | |
| – | 3 | Ronal Longa | Colombia | DQ | TR 16.8 |
| | | | | Wind: -0.1 m/s | |

=== Final ===
| Rank | Lane | Name | Nationality | Time | Notes |
|---|---|---|---|---|---|
| 1st place, gold medalist(s) | 6 | José González | Dominican Republic | 10.30 | |
| 2nd place, silver medalist(s) | 5 | Felipe Bardi | Brazil | 10.31 (.302) | |
| 3rd place, bronze medalist(s) | 1 | Emanuel Archibald | Guyana | 10.31 (.310) | |
| 4 | 3 | Erik Cardoso | Brazil | 10.36 | |
| 5 | 2 | Alonso Edward | Panama | 10.41 | |
| 6 | 7 | Diego Andre Gonzalez | Puerto Rico | 10.43 | |
| 7 | 8 | Odaine McPherson | Jamaica | 10.44 (.434) | |
| 8 | 4 | Shainer Reginfo | Cuba | 10.44 (.440) | |
| | | | | Wind: 0.0 m/s | |
