= Saint Kitts and Nevis at the Pan American Games =

- IOC code: SKN
- NOC: St. Kitts and Nevis Olympic Committee
- Medals Ranked 38th: Gold 0 Silver 2 Bronze 2 Total 4

Pan American Games appearances (overview)
- 1995; 1999; 2003; 2007; 2011; 2015; 2019; 2023

Saint Kitts and Nevis has competed at every edition of the Pan American Games since the twelfth edition of the multi-sport event in 1995. Saint Kitts and Nevis did not compete at the first and only Pan American Winter Games in 1990.

== Pan American Games ==
=== Medals by games ===
Year	Host city	Gold	Silver	Bronze	Total
1995	(Argentina) Mar del Plata	0	0	0	0
1999	(Canada) Winnipeg	0	0	0	0
2003	(Dominican Republic) Santo Domingo	0	0	0	0
2007	(Brazil) Rio de Janeiro	0	0	0	0
2011	(Mexico) Guadalajara	0	2	0	2
2015	(Canada) Toronto	0	0	1	1
2019	(Peru) Lima	0	0	0	0
2023	(Chile) Santiago	0	0	1	1
Total		0	2	2	4

=== Medals by sport ===
Sport	Gold	Silver	Bronze	Total
Athletics	0	2	2	4
Totals (1 entries)	0	2	2	4

== Junior Pan American Games ==
=== Medals by games ===
Games	Gold	Silver	Bronze	Total	Rank
(Colombia) 2021 Cali-Valle	0	1	0	1	22nd
(Paraguay) 2025 Asunción	0	0	0	0	-
Total	0	1	0	1	22nd

=== Medals by sport ===
Sport	Gold	Silver	Bronze	Total
Athletics	0	1	0	1
Totals (1 entries)	0	1	0	1

=== Medalists ===
Medal	Name	Games	Sport	Event
Silver	Amya Clarke	2021 Cali-Valle	Athletics	Women's 100 metres
