= Athletics at the 2011 Pan American Games =

- Dates: October 23–30
- Host city: Guadalajara, Mexico
- Venue: Telmex Athletics Stadium
- Level: Senior
- Events: 47
- Participation: 668 athletes from 39 nations
- Records set: 14 Games records

Athletics competitions at the 2011 Pan American Games in Guadalajara was held from October 23 to October 30 at the newly built Telmex Athletics Stadium. The racewalking and marathon events were held on the temporary Guadalajara Circuit and Route and the Pan American Marathon circuit respectively. The sport of athletics is split into distinct sets of events: track and field events, road running events, and racewalking events.

Mirroring the Olympic athletics programme, both men and women had very similar schedules of events. Men competed in 24 events and women in 23, as their schedule lacks the 50 km race walk. In addition, both the men's 110 m hurdles and decathlon are reflected in the women's schedule by the 100 m hurdles and heptathlon, respectively.

As they had done in the 2007 edition, Cuba topped the athletics medal table, taking 18 gold medals and 33 medals in total. The Brazilian team were a clear second with ten golds and 23 medals overall. The hosts Mexico and the United States both won four events each, while Colombia had the third greatest medal haul with seventeen altogether.

Over the seven-day competition, fourteen Pan American Games records were equalled or bettered. Furthermore, two South American records were set: Brazil's Lucimara da Silva broke the heptathlon record and the Brazilian women's 4 × 100 metres relay quartet also improved a continental mark.

== Medal summary ==
Key
GR	GR	AR	Area record	NR	National record	PB	Personal best	SB	Seasonal best

=== Men's events ===
Event	Gold		Silver		Bronze	
100 metres	Lerone Clarke; Jamaica	10.01 SB	Kim Collins; Saint Kitts and Nevis	10.04	Emmanuel Callender; Trinidad and Tobago	10.16
200 metres	Roberto Skyers; Cuba	20.37	Lansford Spence; Jamaica	20.38	Bruno de Barros; Brazil	20.45
400 metres	Nery Brenes; Costa Rica	44.65 NR	Luguelín Santos; Dominican Republic	44.71 NR	Ramon Miller; Bahamas	45.01 SB
800 metres	Andy González; Cuba	1:45.58 SB	Kléberson Davide; Brazil	1:45.75	Raidel Acea; Cuba	1:46.23
1500 metres	Leandro de Oliveira; Brazil	3:53.44	Byron Piedra; Ecuador	3:53.45	Eduar Villanueva; Venezuela	3:54.06
5,000 metres	Juan Luis Barrios; Mexico	14:13.77	Byron Piedra; Ecuador	14:15.74	Joilson da Silva; Brazil	14:16.11
10,000 metres	Marílson dos Santos; Brazil	29:00.64	Juan Carlos Romero; Mexico	29:41.00	Giovani dos Santos; Brazil	29:51.71
110 m hurdles	Dayron Robles; Cuba	13.10 GR	Paulo Villar; Colombia	13.27 AR	Orlando Ortega; Cuba	13.30
400 m hurdles	Omar Cisneros; Cuba	47.99 GR, NR	Isa Phillips; Jamaica	48.82	Félix Sánchez; Dominican Republic	48.85
3000 m steeplechase	José Peña; Venezuela	8:48.19	Hudson de Souza; Brazil	8:48.75	José Alberto Sánchez; Cuba	8:49.75
4 × 100 m relay	Brazil; Ailson Feitosa; Sandro Viana; Nilson André; Bruno de Barros	38.18 GR	Saint Kitts and Nevis; Jason Rogers; Antoine Adams; Delwayne Delaney; Brijesh Lawrence	38.81	United States; Calesio Newman; Jeremy Dodson; Rubin Williams; Monzavous Edwards	39.17
4 × 400 m relay	Cuba; Noel Ruíz; Raidel Acea; Omar Cisneros; William Collazo	2:59.43 SB	Dominican Republic; Arismendy Peguero; Luguelín Santos; Yoel Tapia; Gustavo Cuesta	3:00.44 NR	Venezuela; Arturo Ramírez; Alberto Aguilar; José Acevedo; Omar Longart	3:00.82 NR
Marathon	Solonei da Silva; Brazil	2:16:37	Diego Colorado; Colombia	2:17:13 PB	Juan Carlos Cardona; Colombia	2:18:20
20 km walk	Érick Barrondo; Guatemala	1:21:51	James Rendón; Colombia	1:22:46	Luis Fernando López; Colombia	1:22:51
50 km walk	Horacio Nava; Mexico	3:48.58	José Leyver; Mexico	3:49.16 PB	Jaime Quiyuch; Guatemala	3:50.33 PB
High jump	Donald Thomas; Bahamas	2.32	Diego Ferrin; Ecuador	2.30 NR	Víctor Moya; Cuba	2.26
Pole vault	Lázaro Borges; Cuba	5.80 GR	Jeremy Scott; United States	5.60	Giovanni Lanaro; Mexico	5.50
Long jump ^{†}	Daniel Pineda; Chile	7.97	David Registe; Dominica	7.89	Jeremy Hicks; United States	7.83
Triple jump	Alexis Copello; Cuba	17.21	Yoandri Betanzos; Cuba	16.54	Jefferson Sabino; Brazil	16.51
Shot put	Dylan Armstrong; Canada	21.30 GR	Carlos Véliz; Cuba	20.76	Germán Lauro; Argentina	20.41 SB
Discus throw	Jorge Fernández; Cuba	65.58	Jarred Rome; United States	61.71	Ronald Julião; Brazil	61.70
Hammer throw	Kibwe Johnson; United States	79.63 GR	Michael Mai; United States	72.71	Noleysis Vicet; Cuba	72.57
Javelin throw	Guillermo Martínez; Cuba	87.20 GR, NR	Cyrus Hostetler; United States	82.24 SB	Braian Toledo; Argentina	79.53 PB
Decathlon	Leonel Suárez; Cuba	8373 GR	Maurice Smith; Jamaica	8214 SB	Yordani Garcia; Cuba	8074

- ^{†} : The original long jump winner was Víctor Castillo of Venezuela, but a positive drug test for methylhexaneamine meant he was stripped of his title and given a lifetime ban.

=== Women's events ===
Event	Gold		Silver		Bronze	
100 metres	Rosângela Santos; Brazil	11.22 PB	Barbara Pierre; United States	11.25	Shakera Reece; Barbados	11.26 NR
200 metres	Ana Cláudia Silva; Brazil	22.76	Simone Facey; Jamaica	22.86 PB	Mariely Sánchez; Dominican Republic	23.02 NR
400 metres	Jennifer Padilla; Colombia	51.53 PB	Daisurami Bonne; Cuba	51.69 PB	Geisa Coutinho; Brazil	51.87
800 metres	Adriana Muñoz; Cuba	2:04.08	Gabriela Medina; Mexico	2:04.41 SB	Rosibel García; Colombia	2:04.45
1500 metres	Adriana Muñoz; Cuba	4:26.09	Rosibel García; Colombia	4:26.78	Malindi Elmore; Canada	4:27.57
5000 metres	Marisol Romero; Mexico	16:24.08	Cruz da Silva; Brazil	16:29.75	Inés Melchor; Peru	16:41.50
10,000 metres	Marisol Romero; Mexico	34:07.24	Cruz da Silva; Brazil	34:22.44	Yolanda Caballero; Colombia	34:39.14 PB
100 m hurdles	Yvette Lewis; United States	12.82	Angela Whyte; Canada	13.09	Lina Flórez; Colombia	13.09
400 m hurdles	Princesa Oliveros; Colombia	56.26 PB	Lucy Jaramillo; Ecuador	56.95 NR	Yolanda Osana; Dominican Republic	57.08 NR
3000 m steeplechase	Sara Hall; United States	10:03.16	Ángela Figueroa; Colombia	10:10.14	Sabine Heitling; Brazil	10:10.98
4 × 100 m relay	Brazil; Ana Cláudia Silva; Vanda Gomes; Franciela Krasucki; Rosângela Santos	42.85 AR	United States; Kenyanna Wilson; Barbara Pierre; Yvette Lewis; Chastity Riggien	43.10	Colombia; Lina Flórez; Jennifer Padilla; Yomara Hinestroza; Norma González	43.44 SB
4 × 400 m relay	Cuba; Aymée Martínez; Diosmely Peña; Susana Clement; Daisurami Bonne	3:28.09	Brazil; Joelma Sousa; Geisa Coutinho; Bárbara de Oliveira; Jailma de Lima	3:29.59	Colombia; Princesa Oliveros; Norma González; Evelis Aguilar; Jennifer Padilla	3:29.94 NR
Marathon	Adriana Aparecida da Silva; Brazil	2:36:37 GR	Madaí Pérez; Mexico	2:38:03	Gladys Tejeda; Peru	2:42:09
20 km walk	Jamy Franco; Guatemala	1:32:38 GR	Mirna Ortiz; Guatemala	1:33:37 PB	Ingrid Hernández; Colombia	1:34:06
High jump	Lesyani Mayor; Cuba	1.89 SB	Marielys Rojas; Venezuela	1.89 SB	Romary Rifka; Mexico	1.89
Pole vault	Yarisley Silva; Cuba	4.75 GR	Fabiana Murer; Brazil	4.70	Becky Holliday; United States	4.30
Long jump	Maurren Maggi; Brazil	6.94 SB	Shameka Marshall; United States	6.73	Caterine Ibargüen; Colombia	6.63 NR
Triple jump	Caterine Ibargüen; Colombia	14.92 GR	Yargelis Savigne; Cuba	14.36	Mabel Gay; Cuba	14.28
Shot put	Misleydis González; Cuba	18.57	Cleopatra Borel-Brown; Trinidad and Tobago	18.46 PB	Michelle Carter; United States	18.09
Discus throw	Yarelys Barrios; Cuba	66.40 GR	Aretha Thurmond; United States	59.53	Denia Caballero; Cuba	58.63
Hammer throw	Yipsi Moreno; Cuba	75.62 GR	Sultana Frizell; Canada	70.11	Amber Campbell; United States	69.93
Javelin throw	Alicia DeShasier; United States	58.01 PB	Yainelis Ribeaux; Cuba	56.21	Yanet Cruz; Cuba	56.19
Heptathlon	Lucimara da Silva; Brazil	6133 AR, PB	Yasmiany Pedroso; Cuba	5844	Francia Manzanillo; Dominican Republic	5710 PB

=== Medal table ===
* Host nation (Mexico)

Rank	Nation	Gold	Silver	Bronze	Total
1	Cuba	18	6	9	33
2	Brazil	10	6	7	23
3	United States	4	8	5	17
4	Mexico*	4	4	2	10
5	Colombia	3	5	9	17
6	Guatemala	2	1	1	4
7	Jamaica	1	4	0	5
8	Canada	1	2	1	4
9	Venezuela	1	1	2	4
10	Bahamas	1	0	1	2
11	Chile	1	0	0	1
11	Costa Rica	1	0	0	1
13	Ecuador	0	4	0	4
14	Dominican Republic	0	2	4	6
15	Saint Kitts and Nevis	0	2	0	2
16	Trinidad and Tobago	0	1	1	2
17	Dominica	0	1	0	1
18	Argentina	0	0	2	2
18	Peru	0	0	2	2
20	Barbados	0	0	1	1
Totals (20 entries)		47	47	47	141

== Participation ==
A total of 668 athletes from 39 countries were entered in the athletics competition. A maximum of two participants were allowed per country for each individual event. Nations were able to enter one competitor who had not achieved the minimum standard performance. To register a second competitor, both athletes needed to have achieved the minimum standard performance.

- Antigua and Barbuda (4)
- Argentina (30)
- Bahamas (13)
- Barbados (4)
- Belize (10)
- Bermuda (2)
- Bolivia (9)
- Brazil (61)
- British Virgin Islands (2)
- Canada (17)
- Cayman Islands (5)
- Chile (19)
- Colombia (39)
- Costa Rica (8)
- Cuba (65)
- Dominica (4)
- Dominican Republic (16)
- Ecuador (23)
- El Salvador (7)
- Grenada (4)
- Guatemala (17)
- Guyana (3)
- Haiti (8)
- Honduras (6)
- Jamaica (33)
- Mexico (59)
- Nicaragua (4)
- Paraguay (6)
- Peru (23)
- Puerto Rico (23)
- Saint Kitts and Nevis (6)
- Saint Lucia (2)
- Saint Vincent and the Grenadines (2)
- Suriname (2)
- Trinidad and Tobago (13)
- United States (82)
- Uruguay (6)
- Venezuela (24)
- Virgin Islands (7)
