= Dontae Richards-Kwok =

Canadian sprinter (born 1989)

Personal information
- Born: 1989 (age 36–37) Toronto, Ontario, Canada
- Height: 1.83 m (6 ft 0 in)
- Weight: 72 kg (159 lb)

Sport
- Sport: Running
- Events: 60 metres, 100 metres, 200 metres, 300 metres
- College team: York University Lions
- Club: Gyal dem track club

Achievements and titles
- Personal bests: 60m: 6.61s (Edmonton 2014) 100m: 10.12s (Weinheim 2013); 200m: 20.74s (Tempe 2012) 300m: 33.65s (Edmonton 2014)
Medal record
Men's athletics
Representing Canada
World Championships
Bronze medal – third place	2013 Moscow	4×100 m relay

Dontae Richards-Kwok (born 1989) is a Canadian sprinter of Chinese-Jamaican descent. Richards-Kwok won a bronze at the 2013 World Championships in Athletics as part of the men's 4 × 100 m relay team, which also included Gavin Smellie, Aaron Brown, and Justyn Warner.
