= Brijesh Lawrence =

Saint Kitts and Nevis sprinter (born 1989)

BJ Lawrence
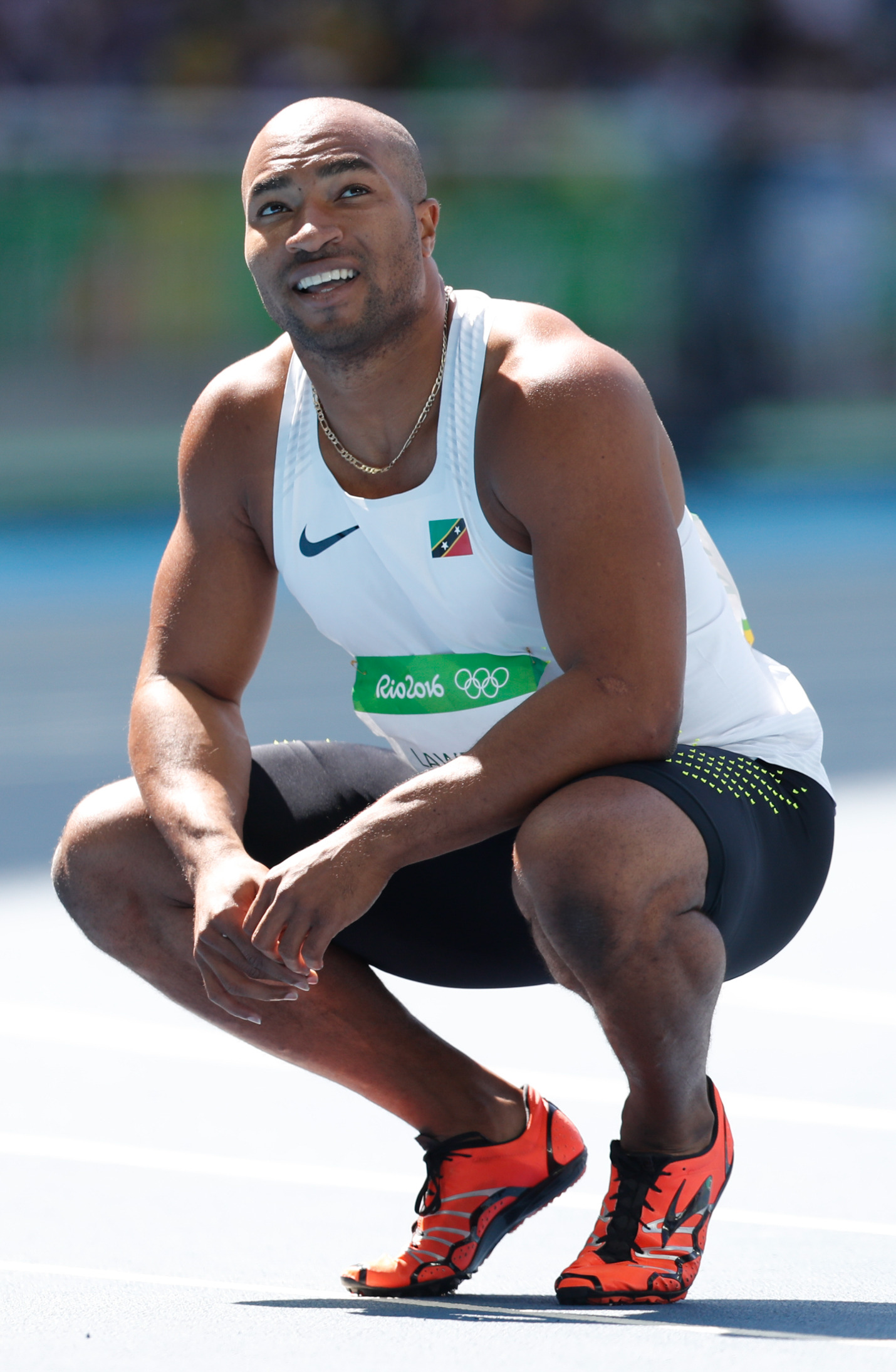
- Lawrence at the 2016 Olympics

Personal information
- Full name: Brijesh Sharmari Lawrence
- Nationality: Saint Kitts and Nevis
- Born: 27 December 1989 (age 36) Basseterre, Saint Kitts and Nevis
- Height: 1.80 m (5 ft 11 in)
- Weight: 93 kg (205 lb)

Sport
- Sport: Running
- Events: 100 metres, 200 metres
- College team: Doane College

Achievements and titles
- Personal best: 100 m: 10.12 s (Crete 2012)
Medal record
Representing Saint Kitts and Nevis
World Championships
Bronze medal – third place	2011 Daegu	4×100 m relay
Pan American Games
Silver medal – second place	2011 Guadalajara	4×100 m relay
CAC Championships
Bronze medal – third place	2011 Mayagüez	4×100 m relay
- Updated on 23 December 2014

Brijesh Sharmari "BJ" Lawrence (born 27 December 1989) is a Saint Kitts and Nevis sprinter who specialises in the 100 metres. He won a bronze medal in the 4 × 100 m relay at the 2011 World Championships.

He studied at Doane College in Crete, Nebraska.

== Personal bests ==
Event	Result	Venue	Date
Outdoor
100 m	10.12 s (wind: +1.2 m/s)	Crete, United States	21 April 2012
200 m	20.34 s (wind: +1.1 m/s)	Walnut, United States	19 April 2014
Indoor
60 m	6.62 s A	Albuquerque, United States	8 February 2014
200 m	20.99 s	Lincoln, United States	19 February 2011

== International competitions ==
Year	Competition	Venue	Position	Event	Notes
Representing Saint Kitts and Nevis
2010	NACAC Under-23 Championships	Miramar, United States	8th	100m	10.45 (wind: +1.7 m/s)
2010	NACAC Under-23 Championships	Miramar, United States	10th (h)	200m	21.10 w (wind: +2.8 m/s)
2010	Central American and Caribbean Games	Mayagüez, Puerto Rico	17th (h)	100m	10.51 (wind: +1.1 m/s)
2010	Central American and Caribbean Games	Mayagüez, Puerto Rico	19th (h)	200m	21.53 (wind: -1.0 m/s)
2010	Central American and Caribbean Games	Mayagüez, Puerto Rico	7th	4 × 100 m relay	39.43
2010	Commonwealth Games	Delhi, India	6th (qf)	100m	10.62 (wind: +0.5 m/s)
2011	Central American and Caribbean Championships	Mayagüez, Puerto Rico	13th (h)	100m	10.61 (wind: -1.5 m/s)
2011	Central American and Caribbean Championships	Mayagüez, Puerto Rico	4th	200m	21.03 (wind: +1.1 m/s)
2011	Central American and Caribbean Championships	Mayagüez, Puerto Rico	3rd	4 × 100 m relay	39.07
2011	World Championships	Daegu, South Korea	43rd	200m	21.16 (wind: -1.1 m/s)
2011	World Championships	Daegu, South Korea	3rd	4 × 100 m relay	38.49
2011	Pan American Games	Guadalajara, Mexico	14th (sf)	200m	20.82 A (wind: +0.5 m/s)
2011	Pan American Games	Guadalajara, Mexico	2nd	4 × 100 m relay	38.81 A
2012	World Indoor Championships	Istanbul, Turkey	18th (sf)	60m	6.80
2012	Olympic Games	London, United Kingdom	6th (h)	4 × 100 m relay	38.41
2013	Central American and Caribbean Championships	Morelia, Mexico	16th (h)	100m	10.43 A (wind: +1.7 m/s)
2014	World Indoor Championships	Sopot, Poland	20th (sf)	60m	6.68
2014	World Relays	Nassau, Bahamas	12th (B)	4 × 100 m relay	39.07
2014	World Relays	Nassau, Bahamas	2nd	4 × 200 m relay	1:20.51
2014	Commonwealth Games	Glasgow, United Kingdom	8th (sf)	100m	10.49 (wind: +0.7 m/s)
2014	Commonwealth Games	Glasgow, United Kingdom	5th (h)	200m	21.21 (wind: -0.5 m/s)
2014	Commonwealth Games	Glasgow, United Kingdom	–	4 × 100 m relay	DNF
2014	Pan American Sports Festival	Mexico City, Mexico	6th	200m	20.46 A (wind: +0.6 m/s)
2014	Central American and Caribbean Games	Xalapa, Mexico	4th	4 × 100 m relay	39.35 A
2015	NACAC Championships	San José, Costa Rica	7th	200m	21.03 (wind: +1.8 m/s)
2015	NACAC Championships	San José, Costa Rica	6th	4 × 100 m relay	39.20
2015	World Championships	Beijing, China	39th (h)	100 m	10.40
2016	Olympic Games	Rio de Janeiro, Brazil	62nd (h)	100 m	10.55
2016	Olympic Games	Rio de Janeiro, Brazil	15th (h)	4 × 100 m relay	39.81
2017	IAAF World Relays	Nassau, Bahamas	8th (B)	4 × 100 m relay	41.07
2017	IAAF World Relays	Nassau, Bahamas	10th (h)	4 × 200 m relay	1:24.89
