= Shenel Crooke =

Nevisian sprinter (born 1993)

Personal information
- Full name: Shenel Drucilla Crooke
- Born: 14 October 1993 (age 32) Basseterre, Saint Kitts and Nevis
- Education: Morgan State University
- Height: 5 ft 7 in (170 cm)

Sport
- Sport: Athletics
- Event: 100 metres
- College team: Morgan State Bears

Shenel Drucilla Crooke (born 14 October 1993) is a sprinter from Saint Kitts and Nevis. She competed in the 100 metres at the 2018 Commonwealth Games reaching the semifinals.

== International competitions ==
Year	Competition	Venue	Position	Event	Notes
Representing Saint Kitts and Nevis
2010	Central American and Caribbean; Junior Championships (U20)	Santo Domingo, Dominican Republic	5th	4 × 100 m relay	47.30
2015	Pan American Games	Toronto, Canada	18th (h)	100 m	11.43 (w)
2015	NACAC Championships	San José, Costa Rica	16th (h)	100 m	11.65
2018	Commonwealth Games	Gold Coast, Australia	17th (sf)	100 m	11.69
2018	Central American and Caribbean Games	Barranquilla, Colombia	6th	100 m	11.53
2019	Pan American Games	Lima, Peru	21st (h)	100 m	12.36

== Personal bests ==
Outdoor

- 100 metres – 11.42 (+1.5 m/s, Winston-Salem 2016)
- 200 metres – 23.73 (+0.2 m/s, Lexington 2017)

Indoor

- 60 metres – 7.40 (New York 2017)
- 200 metres – 23.94 (Boston 2017)
