= Rasheed Dwyer =

Jamaican sprinter (born 1989)

Personal information
- Nationality: Jamaican
- Born: 29 January 1989 (age 37)

Sport
- Sport: Track and field
- Event: 200 m
- College team: GC Foster College
- Club: Sprintec Track Club
Medal record
Men's Athletics
Representing Jamaica
World Championships
| Gold medal – first place | 2015 Beijing | 4 × 100 m relay |
IAAF World Relays
| Gold medal – first place | 2015 Nassau | 4 × 200 m relay |
| Gold medal – first place | 2014 Nassau | 4 × 200 m relay |
| Bronze medal – third place | 2017 Nassau | 4 × 200 m relay |
Commonwealth Games
| Gold medal – first place | 2014 Glasgow | 200 m |
| Silver medal – second place | 2010 Delhi | 4 × 100 m relay |
Universiade
| Gold medal – first place | 2011 Shenzhen | 200 m |
| Silver medal – second place | 2013 Kazan | 200 m |
Pan American Games
| Silver medal – second place | 2015 Toronto | 200 m |
NACAC Championships
| Gold medal – first place | 2015 Costa Rica | 200 m |
Central American and Caribbean Games
| Silver medal – second place | 2010 Mayagüez | 200 m |
| Silver medal – second place | 2010 Mayagüez | 4 × 100 m relay |
| Bronze medal – third place | 2018 Barranquilla | 4 × 100 m relay |
CAC Championships
| Silver medal – second place | 2009 Havana | 4 × 100 m relay |
Representing Americas
Continental Cup
| Silver medal – second place | 2010 Split | 200 m |

Rasheed Dwyer (born 29 January 1989) is a Jamaican athlete specializing in the sprinting events. His two biggest successes to date are winning the gold in 200 metres at the 2011 Summer Universiade and also winning the gold (200 metres) at the 2014 Commonwealth Games. He studied at the G.C. Foster College in Spanish Town. Dwyer also represented Jamaica in the 200 metres at the 2020 Summer Olympics, placing seventh in the final.

Athletics Men's 200 Final - 27th Summer Universiade 2013 - Kazan (RUS) Dwyer takes second

== Achievements ==
| Year | Competition | Venue | Position | Event | Notes |
Representing Jamaica
| 2008 | World Junior Championships | Bydgoszcz, Poland | 3rd (h) | 4 × 100 m relay | 39.62 |
| 2009 | Central American and Caribbean Championships | Havana, Cuba | 2nd | 4 × 100 m relay | 39.31 |
| 2010 | NACAC U23 Championships | Miramar, United States | 3rd | 200 m | 20.64 (+2.8 m/s) w |
| 2010 | NACAC U23 Championships | Miramar, United States | 2nd | 4 × 100 m relay | 39.36 |
| 2010 | Central American and Caribbean Games | Mayagüez, Puerto Rico | 2nd | 200 m | 20.49 (PB) |
| 2010 | Central American and Caribbean Games | Mayagüez, Puerto Rico | 2nd | 4 × 100 m relay | 38.78 |
| 2010 | Commonwealth Games | Delhi, India | 9th (sf) | 200 m | 21.13 |
| 2010 | Commonwealth Games | Delhi, India | 2nd | 4 × 100 m relay | 38.79 |
| 2011 | Universiade | Daegu, South Korea | 1st | 200 m | 20.20 (PB) |
| 2013 | Universiade | Kazan, Russia | 2nd | 200 m | 20.23 |
| 2014 | IAAF World Relays | Nassau, Bahamas | 1st (h) | 4 × 200 m relay | 1:20.15 |
| 2014 | Commonwealth Games | Glasgow, United Kingdom | 1st | 200 m | 20.14 |
| 2015 | IAAF World Relays | Nassau, Bahamas | 1st | 4 × 200 m relay | 1:20.97 |
| 2015 | Pan American Games | Toronto, Canada | 2nd | 200 m | 19.90 |
| 2015 | NACAC Championships | San José, Costa Rica | 1st | 200 m | 20.12 +1.8 |
| 2015 | World Championships | Beijing, China | 1st | 4 × 100 m relay | 37.36 |
| 2017 | World Championships | London, United Kingdom | 20th (sf) | 200 m | 20.69 |
| 2018 | Commonwealth Games | Gold Coast, Australia | 14th (sf) | 200 m | 20.82 |
| 2018 | Central American and Caribbean Games | Barranquilla, Colombia | 4th | 200 m | 20.41 |
| 2018 | Central American and Caribbean Games | Barranquilla, Colombia | 3rd | 4 × 100 m relay | 38.79 |
| 2019 | World Relays | Yokohama, Japan | 6th | 4 × 100 m relay | 38.88 |
| 2019 | Pan American Games | Lima, Peru | 5th | 100 m | 10.32 |
| 2019 | Pan American Games | Lima, Peru | 5th | 4 × 100 m relay | 39.01 |
| 2019 | World Championships | Doha, Qatar | 16th (sf) | 200 m | 20.54 |
| 2019 | World Championships | Doha, Qatar | 11th (h) | 4 × 100 m relay | 38.15 |
| 2021 | Olympic Games | Tokyo, Japan | 7th | 200 m | 20.21 |
| 2022 | World Championships | Eugene, United States | 23rd (sf) | 200 m | 20.87 |
| 2023 | World Championships | Budapest, Hungary | 17th (sf) | 200 m | 20.49 |

== Personal bests ==
- 100 Metres – 10.10 (Kingston 2016)
- 200 Metres – 19.80 (Toronto 2015)
