= Chen Shiwei =

Chinese sprinter (born 1991)

Chen Shiwei (陈时伟; born 2 August 1991) is a Chinese track and field sprint athlete who competes in the Men's 4 × 100 m relay event. He is from Changle District, Fuzhou. Chen holds Chinese records and won the men's 4 × 100 m relay at the 2014 Asian Games. Chen holds the Asian record of the 4 × 100 m relay, 37.99 in Incheon.
