= Antoine Adams =

Saint Kitts and Nevis sprinter

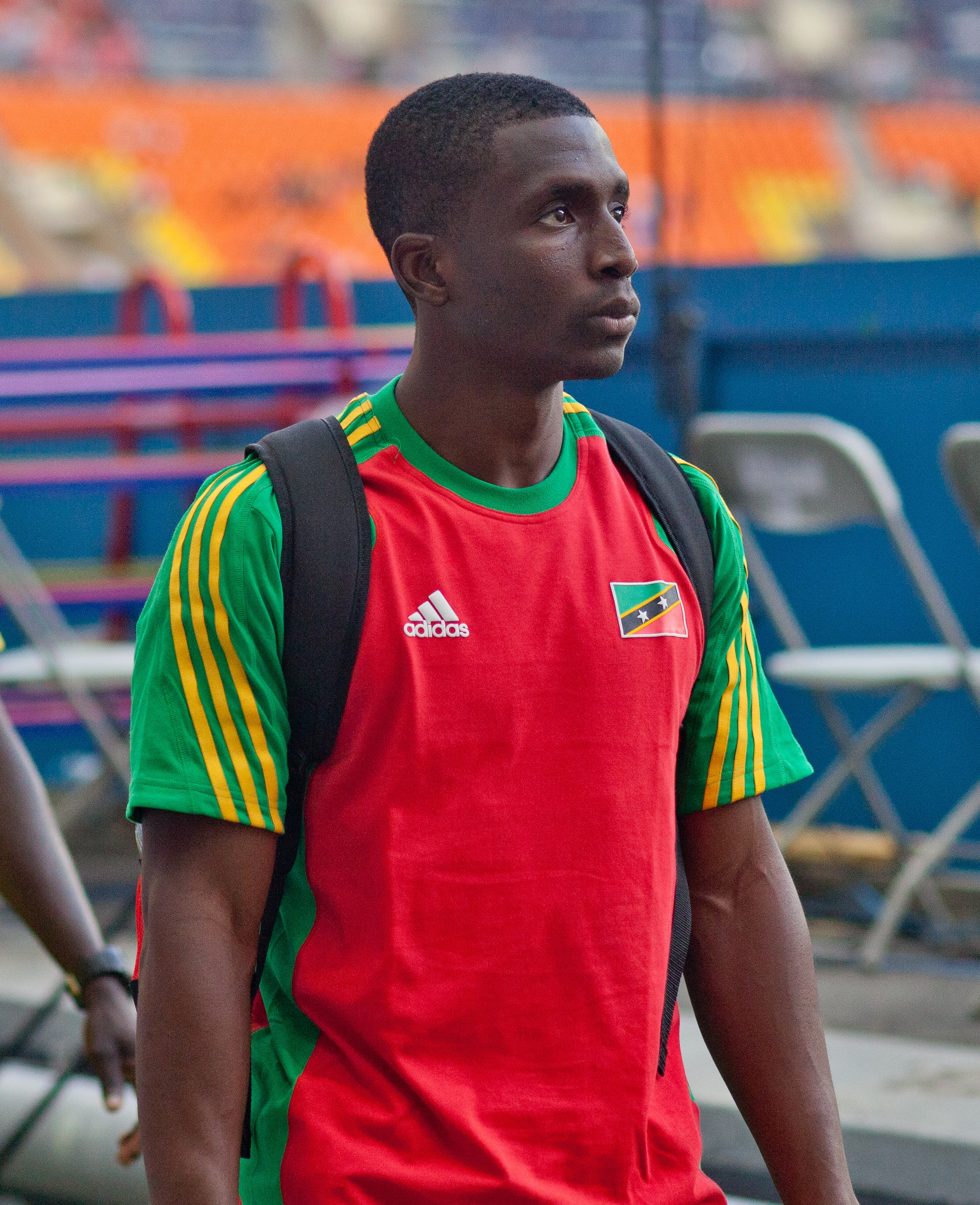
- Antoine Adams during 2013 World Championships in Athletics in Moscow.

Personal information
- Full name: Antoine Xavier Adams
- Nationality: Saint Kitts and Nevis
- Born: 31 August 1988 (age 37) Cayon, Saint Kitts and Nevis
- Height: 1.80 m (5 ft 11 in)
- Weight: 79 kg (174 lb)
- Website: antoinexadams.com

Sport
- Sport: Running
- Events: 100 metres, 200 metres

Achievements and titles
- Personal best: 100 m: 10.01 s (Basseterre 2013) 200 m: 20.08 s (Basseterre 2014)
Medal record
Men's athletics
Representing Saint Kitts and Nevis
World Championships
Bronze medal – third place	2011 Daegu	4×100 m relay
Pan American Games
Silver medal – second place	2011 Guadalajara	4×100 m relay
Bronze medal – third place	2015 Toronto	100 m
CAC Championships
Gold medal – first place	2013 Morelia	200 m
Bronze medal – third place	2011 Mayagüez	4×100 m relay
- Updated on 23 December 2014

Antoine Adams (born 31 August 1988) is a retired Olympic sprinter who specialized in the 200 metres. He was part of the 4 × 100 m relay team that won the bronze medal at the 2011 World Championships in Daegu, South Korea.

Born in Cayon, Saint Kitts and Nevis, Adams showed early promise in track and field, excelling throughout his school years. After graduating from Cayon High School in 2005, he briefly attended The Clarence Fitzroy Bryant College in 2006 before relocating to Houston, Texas in 2007 to pursue his athletic career more seriously. There, he enrolled in community college and began training under coach Eric Francis.

Following his competitive career, Antoine Adams transitioned into filmmaking and creative production. Today, he helps brands grow through storytelling, combining his Olympic-level discipline with a passion for visual media.

== Personal bests ==
Event	Result	Venue	Date
Outdoor
100 m	10.01 s (wind: +2.0 m/s)	Basseterre, Saint Kitts and Nevis	16 June 2013
200 m	20.08 s (wind: +1.6 m/s)	Basseterre, Saint Kitts and Nevis	22 June 2014
Indoor
60 m	6.58 s	Houston, United States	12 February 2016
200 m	20.93 s	College Station, United States	13 December 2014

== International competitions ==
Year	Competition	Venue	Position	Event	Notes
Representing Saint Kitts and Nevis
2006	CARIFTA Games (U20)	Les Abymes, Guadeloupe	4th (h)	100 m	11.35 (-1.5 m/s)
2006	CARIFTA Games (U20)	Les Abymes, Guadeloupe	4th (h)	200 m	22.65 (+0.2 m/s)
2007	CARIFTA Games (U20)	Providenciales, Turks and Caicos Islands	2nd	4 × 100 m	40.71
2007	Pan American Junior Championships	São Paulo, Brazil	8th (sf)	100 m	10.79 (+0.2 m/s)
2007	Pan American Junior Championships	São Paulo, Brazil	6th (h)	200 m	21.60 (0.0 m/s)
2007	Pan American Junior Championships	São Paulo, Brazil	6th	4 × 100 m	42.25
2007	NACAC Championships	San Salvador, El Salvador	5th	4 × 100 m	40.37
2010	NACAC Under-23 Championships	Miramar, United States	8th (h)	100 m	10.57 (+0.4 m/s)
2010	NACAC Under-23 Championships	Miramar, United States	5th	200 m	21.00 w (+2.8 m/s)
2010	Central American and Caribbean Games	Mayagüez, Puerto Rico	15th (h)	100 m	10.49 (+1.4 m/s)
2010	Central American and Caribbean Games	Mayagüez, Puerto Rico	14th (h)	200 m	21.14 w (+2.8 m/s)
2010	Central American and Caribbean Games	Mayagüez, Puerto Rico	7th	4 × 100 m	39.43
2010	Commonwealth Games	Delhi, India	7th (qf)	200 m	21.69 (+0.1 m/s)
2011	Central American and Caribbean Championships	Mayagüez, Puerto Rico	12th (h)	100 m	10.57 (-1.3 m/s)
2011	Central American and Caribbean Championships	Mayagüez, Puerto Rico	16th (h)	200 m	21.39 (+1.1 m/s)
2011	Central American and Caribbean Championships	Mayagüez, Puerto Rico	3rd	4 × 100 m	39.07
2011	World Championships	Daegu, South Korea	3rd	4 × 100 m	38.49
2011	Pan American Games	Guadalajara, Mexico	10th (sf)	200 m	20.76 A (+0.2 m/s)
2011	Pan American Games	Guadalajara, Mexico	2nd	4 × 100 m	38.81 A
2012	Olympic Games	London, United Kingdom	21st (sf)	100 m	10.27 (+1.0 m/s)
2012	Olympic Games	London, United Kingdom	18th (h)^{1}	200 m	20.59 (-0.4 m/s)
2012	Olympic Games	London, United Kingdom	13th (h)	4 × 100 m	38.41
2013	BVI Twilight Invitational	Road Town, British Virgin Islands	2nd place, silver medalist(s)	100 m	10.28 (-0.2 m/s)
2013	BVI Twilight Invitational	Road Town, British Virgin Islands	2nd place, silver medalist(s)	200 m	20.87 (-0.3 m/s)
2013	Central American and Caribbean Championships	Morelia, Mexico	1st	200 m	20.13 A (+0.5 m/s)
2013	Central American and Caribbean Championships	Morelia, Mexico	6th	4 × 100 m	39.82 A
2013	World Championships	Moscow, Russia	16th (sf)	100 m	10.17 (+0.4 m/s)
2013	World Championships	Moscow, Russia	13th (sf)	200 m	20.47 (0.0 m/s)
2013	World Championships	Moscow, Russia	13th (h)	4 × 100 m	38.58
2014	World Relays	Nassau, Bahamas	12th (B)	4 × 100 m	39.07
2014	World Relays	Nassau, Bahamas	2nd	4 × 200 m	1:20.51
2014	Commonwealth Games	Glasgow, United Kingdom	4th	100 m	10.16 (0.0 m/s)
2014	Commonwealth Games	Glasgow, United Kingdom	16th (sf)	200 m	20.76 (+0.2 m/s)
2014	Central American and Caribbean Games	Xalapa, Mexico	4th	4 × 100 m	39.35 A
2015	Pan American Games	Toronto, Canada	3rd	100 m	10.09
2015	Pan American Games	Toronto, Canada	16th (sf)	200 m	20.82
2015	NACAC Championships	San José, Costa Rica	3rd	200 m	20.47 (+1.8 m/s)
2015	NACAC Championships	San José, Costa Rica	6th	4 × 100 m	39.20
2015	World Championships	Beijing, China	31st (h)	100 m	10.23
2015	World Championships	Beijing, China	39th (h)	200 m	20.75
2016	World Indoor Championships	Portland, United States	16th (sf)	60 m	6.66
2016	Olympic Games	Rio de Janeiro, Brazil	54th (h)	100 m	10.39
2016	Olympic Games	Rio de Janeiro, Brazil	30th (h)	200 m	20.49
2016	Olympic Games	Rio de Janeiro, Brazil	15th (h)	4 × 100 m relay	39.81

^{1}: Disqualified in the semifinal.

Olympic Games
Preceded by Kim Collins	Flagbearer for Saint Kitts and Nevis; Rio de Janeiro 2016	Succeeded by Amya Clarke; Jason Rogers
