= Jason Rogers (sprinter) =

Saint Kitts and Nevis sprinter

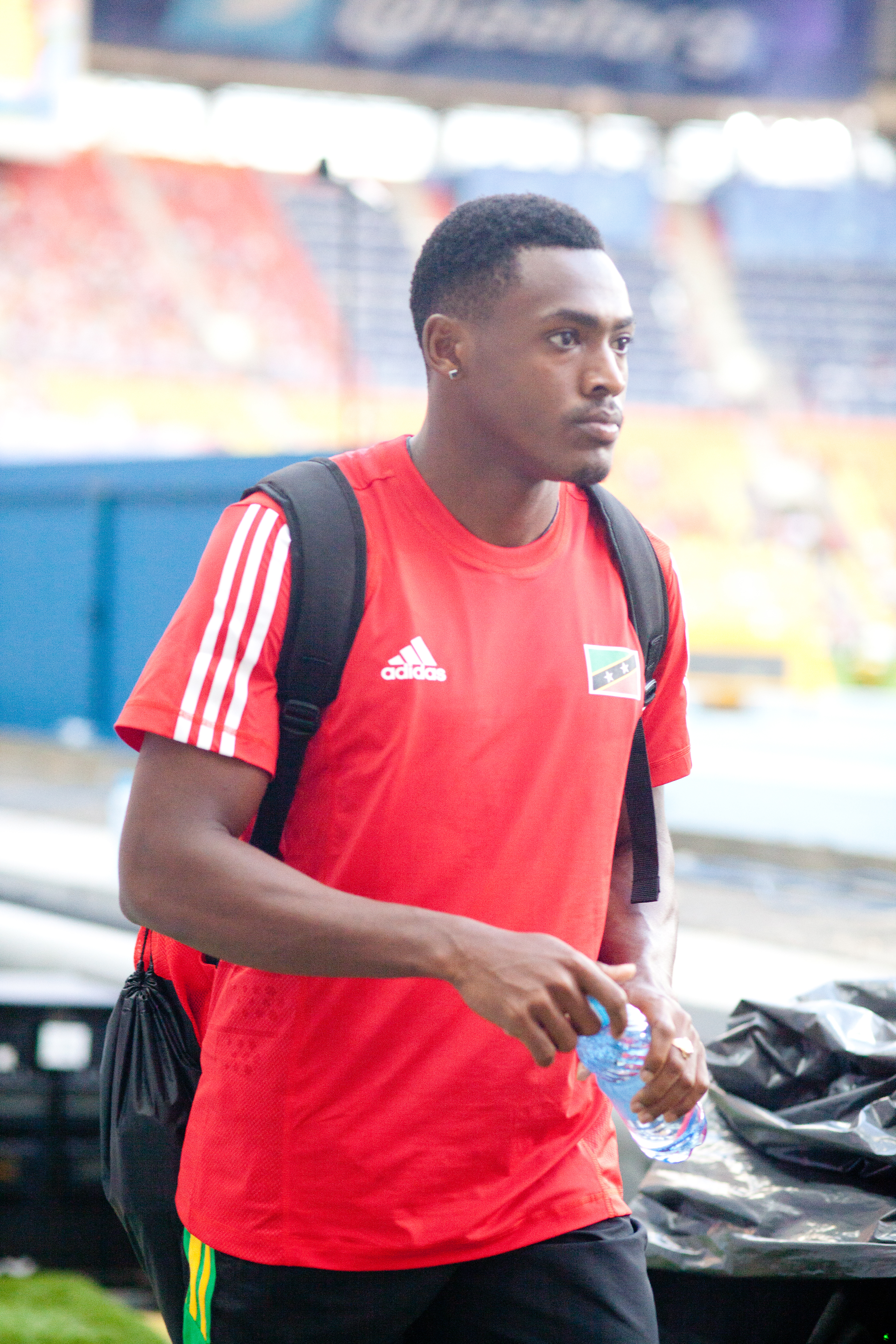
- Rogers at the 2013 World Championships

Personal information
- Full name: Jason Aliston Rogers
- Nationality: Saint Kitts and Nevis
- Born: 31 August 1991 (age 34) Sandy Point, Saint Kitts and Nevis
- Height: 1.73 m (5 ft 8 in)
- Weight: 69 kg (152 lb)

Sport
- Sport: Running
- Events: 100 metres, 200 metres

Achievements and titles
- Personal bests: 100 m: 10.01 (Basseterre 2013 and Miami 2021)
Medal record
Men's athletics
Representing Saint Kitts and Nevis
World Championships
Bronze medal – third place	2011 Daegu	4×100 m relay
Pan American Games
Silver medal – second place	2011 Guadalajara	4×100 m relay
Central American and Caribbean Games
Silver medal – second place	2018 Barranquilla	100 m
CAC Championships
Bronze medal – third place	2008 Cali	4×100 m relay
Bronze medal – third place	2011 Mayagüez	4×100 m relay
CAC Junior Championships
Silver medal – second place	2010 Santo Domingo	100 m
CARIFTA Games (Junior)
Silver medal – second place	2010 George Town	100 m
- Updated on 22 December 2014

Jason Aliston Rogers (born 31 August 1991) is a Saint Kitts and Nevis sprinter who specialises in the 100 metres.

Rogers helped win a bronze medal as a part of the 4 × 100 m relay at the 2008 Central American and Caribbean Championships in Cali, Colombia. He also finished sixth in the 100 metres final of the 2010 World Junior Championships in Moncton, Canada. He has competed in three Olympic Games for his country (2012, 2016 and 2020). At the 2020 Olympics, he was the flagbearer for Saint Kitts and Nevis. He has also competed at the 2010, 2014 and 2018 Commonwealth Games, and the 2011 and 2013 World Championships.

== Personal bests ==
Event	Result	Venue	Date
Outdoor
100 m	10.01 s (wind: +2.0 m/s)	Basseterre, Saint Kitts and Nevis	16 June 2013
200 m	20.84 s A (wind: +0.6 m/s)	Mexico City, Mexico	16 August 2014
Indoor
60 m	6.52 s	Toronto, Canada	15 February 2014

== International competitions ==
Year	Competition	Venue	Position	Event	Notes
Representing Saint Kitts and Nevis
2006	CARIFTA Games (U17)	Les Abymes, Guadeloupe	4th (h)	100 m	11.26 (+0.4 m/s)
2006	CARIFTA Games (U17)	Les Abymes, Guadeloupe	3rd (h)	200 m	23.46 (+0.1 m/s)
2006	CARIFTA Games (U17)	Les Abymes, Guadeloupe	6th	4 × 100 m	44.23
2006	Central American and Caribbean; Junior Championships (U17)	Port of Spain, Trinidad and Tobago	6th (h)	100 m	11.64 (+1.0 m/s)
2006	Central American and Caribbean; Junior Championships (U17)	Port of Spain, Trinidad and Tobago	5th	4 × 100 m	42.87
2008	CARIFTA Games (U20)	Basseterre, Saint Kitts and Nevis	4th (sf)	100 m	10.58 w (+4.7 m/s)
2008	CARIFTA Games (U20)	Basseterre, Saint Kitts and Nevis	6th (sf)	200 m	21.95 (-1.1 m/s)
2008	CARIFTA Games (U20)	Basseterre, Saint Kitts and Nevis	7th	4 × 100 m	77.94
2008	Leeward Islands Junior; Championships (U20)	Road Town, British Virgin Islands	1st	100 m	10.67 (+0.4 m/s)
2008	Leeward Islands Junior; Championships (U20)	Road Town, British Virgin Islands	2nd	200 m	22.33 (0.0 m/s)
2008	Leeward Islands Junior; Championships (U20)	Road Town, British Virgin Islands	2nd	4 × 100 m	43.62
2008	Central American and Caribbean Championships	Cali, Colombia	24th (h)	100 m	10.81 A (+1.0 m/s)
2008	Central American and Caribbean Championships	Cali, Colombia	3rd	4 × 100 m	40.81
2008	Commonwealth Youth Games	Pune, India	3rd	100 m	10.52 (-0.1 m/s)
2008	Commonwealth Youth Games	Pune, India	4th	200 m	21.43 (+0.2 m/s)
2009	CARIFTA Games (U20)	Vieux Fort, Saint Lucia	5th (sf)	200 m	21.69 w (+2.3 m/s)
2009	CARIFTA Games (U20)	Vieux Fort, Saint Lucia	4th	4 × 100 m	41.04
2009	CARIFTA Games (U20)	Vieux Fort, Saint Lucia	6th	4 × 400 m	3:18.23
2009	Central American and Caribbean Championships	Havana, Cuba	22nd (h)	100 m	10.68 (+0.1 m/s)
2009	Central American and Caribbean Championships	Havana, Cuba	21st (h)	200 m	21.85 (-0.3 m/s)
2009	Pan American Junior Championships	Port of Spain, Trinidad and Tobago	6th	100 m	10.49 (+0.7 m/s)
2009	Pan American Junior Championships	Port of Spain, Trinidad and Tobago	4th (h)	200 m	22.16 (0.0 m/s)
2009	Pan American Junior Championships	Port of Spain, Trinidad and Tobago	7th	4 × 400 m	3:24.32
2010	CARIFTA Games (U20)	George Town, Cayman Islands	2nd	100 m	10.48 (+0.8 m/s)
2010	Central American and Caribbean; Junior Championships	Santo Domingo, Dominican Republic	2nd	100 m	10.66 (-1.3 m/s)
2010	World Junior Championships	Moncton, Canada	6th	100 m	10.49 (-0.7 m/s)
2010	Central American and Caribbean Games	Mayagüez, Puerto Rico	7th	4 × 100 m	39.43
2010	Commonwealth Games	Delhi, India	8th	100 m	10.92 (+0.1 m/s)
2011	Central American and Caribbean Championships	Mayagüez, Puerto Rico	3rd	4 × 100 m	39.07
2011	World Championships	Daegu, South Korea	3rd	4 × 100 m	38.49
2011	Pan American Games	Guadalajara, Mexico	10th (sf)	100 m	10.44 (-1.9 m/s)
2011	Pan American Games	Guadalajara, Mexico	2nd	4 × 100 m	38.81
2012	NACAC Under-23 Championships	Irapuato, Mexico	1st	100 m	10.06 A (+0.9 m/s)
2012	Olympic Games	London, United Kingdom	5th (h)	100 m	10.30 (+0.4 m/s)
2012	Olympic Games	London, United Kingdom	6th (h)	4 × 100 m	38.41
2013	Central American and Caribbean Championships	Morelia, Mexico	5th	100 m	10.24 A (+0.5 m/s)
2013	Central American and Caribbean Championships	Morelia, Mexico	6th	4 × 100 m	39.82 A
2013	World Championships	Moscow, Russia	15th (sf)	100 m	10.15 (+0.4 m/s)
2013	World Championships	Moscow, Russia	13th (h)	4 × 100 m	38.58
2014	World Indoor Championships	Sopot, Poland	14th (sf)	60m	6.62
2014	World Relays	Nassau, Bahamas	12th (B)	4 × 100 m	39.07
2014	Commonwealth Games	Glasgow, United Kingdom	5th (sf)	100 m	10.30 (0.0 m/s)
2014	Commonwealth Games	Glasgow, United Kingdom	–	4 × 100 m	DNF
2014	Pan American Sports Festival	Mexico City, Mexico	1st	100 m	10.08 A (-1.3 m/s)
2014	Pan American Sports Festival	Mexico City, Mexico	8th	200 m	20.84 A (+0.6 m/s)
2014	Central American and Caribbean Games	Xalapa, Mexico	4th	4 × 100 m	39.35 A
2015	NACAC Championships	San José, Costa Rica	6th	100 m	10.29 (-0.1 m/s)
2015	NACAC Championships	San José, Costa Rica	6th	4 × 100 m	39.20
2016	Olympic Games	Rio de Janeiro, Brazil	15th (h)	4 × 100 m	39.81
2018	Commonwealth Games	Gold Coast, Australia	6th	100 m	10.24
2018	Central American and Caribbean Games	Barranquilla, Colombia	2nd	100 m	10.15
2018	NACAC Championships	Toronto, Canada	8th (h)	100 m	10.23^{1}
2019	Pan American Games	Lima, Peru	7th	100 m	10.40
2021	Olympic Games	Tokyo, Japan	17th (sf)	100 m	10.12

^{1}Disqualified in the final

Olympic Games
Preceded by Antoine Adams	Flagbearer for Saint Kitts and Nevis (with Amya Clarke); Tokyo 2020	Succeeded by Zahria Allers-Liburd; Naqille Harris
