= Gavin Smellie =

Canadian sprinter

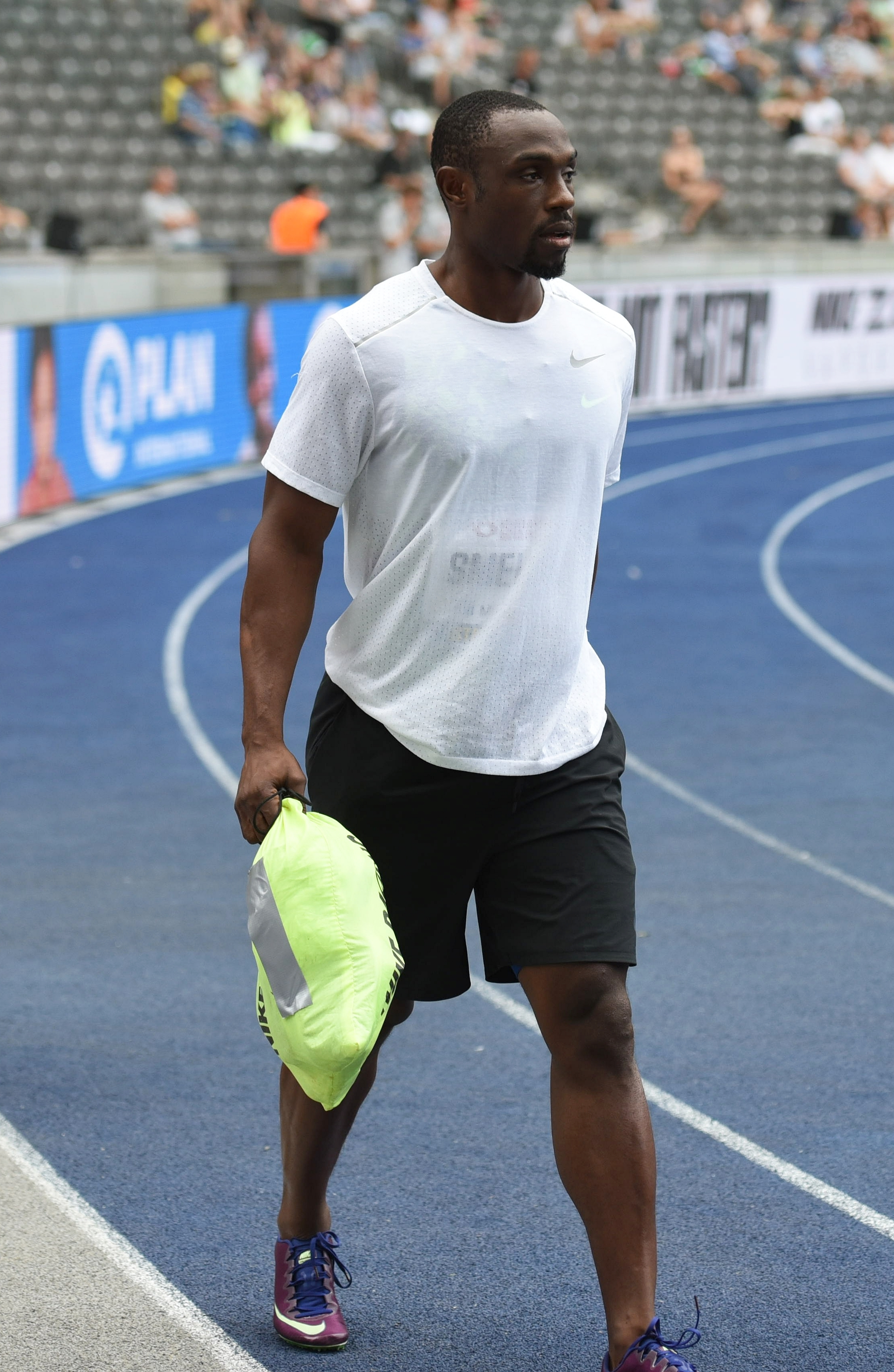
- Smellie at the 2019 ISTAF in Berlin

Personal information
- Full name: Gavin Ramon Smellie
- Born: June 26, 1986 (age 40) Kingston, Jamaica
- Home town: Brampton, Ontario, Canada
- Height: 180 cm (5 ft 11 in)
- Weight: 80 kg (176 lb)

Sport
- Country: Canada
- Sport: Track and field
- Event: Sprints
- College team: Western Kentucky Hilltoppers
Medal record
Men's athletics
Representing Canada
World Championships
Bronze medal – third place	2013 Moscow	4 × 100 m relay
World Relay Championships
Gold medal – first place	2017 Nassau	4 × 200 m relay

Gavin Ramon Smellie (born June 26, 1986) is a Jamaican-Canadian sprinter. A two-time Olympian, he competed for Canada in the men's 4 × 100 metres relay at the 2012 Summer Olympics in London, England, and in the men's 100 metres at the 2020 Summer Olympics in Tokyo, Japan.

== Early life ==
Smellie was born on June 26, 1986, in the Papine neighbourhood of Kingston, Jamaica. He moved to Canada with his family in 2001 at the age of 14, settling in the Weston and Albion roads area of Etobicoke, Ontario. During his youth, Smellie played soccer as a striker. He initially attended George Harvey Collegiate Institute before transferring to Dante Alighieri Academy, where he began running and completed his high school education.

== College career ==
Smellie attended Western Kentucky University on an athletic scholarship, graduating in 2010 with a degree in business. He represented the Western Kentucky Hilltoppers in NCAA Division I indoor and outdoor track and field competitions.

== Professional career ==
Smellie represented Canada at the 2012 Summer Olympics in London, England, competing in the men's 4 × 100 metres relay alongside Oluseyi Smith, Jared Connaughton, and Justyn Warner. The Canadian team finished third in the final with a time of 38.07 seconds and initially appeared set to claim the bronze medal, but officials disqualified them after determining that third leg runner Connaughton had stepped on the lane line during the baton exchange. Trinidad and Tobago received the bronze medal as a result.

In 2021, Smellie represented Canada at the 2020 Summer Olympics in Tokyo, Japan, competing in the men's 100 metres. He finished eighth in his heat (51st overall) with a time of 10.44 seconds and did not advance.

== Personal life ==
Smellie is married to his wife, Sandy, and they have two daughters, Sydney and Naomi.

== Personal bests ==
Event	Time	Wind	Venue	Date	Results Score
100 metres	10.01	+1.4	Windsor, ON (CAN)	May 19, 2018	1203
100 metres	9.97 *	+5.1	Clermont, FL (USA)	April 15, 2017	1187
200 metres	20.38	+1.6	Windsor, ON (CAN)	June 18, 2017	1161
200 metres	20.16 *	+2.7	Clermont, FL (USA)	May 16, 2015	1179
400 metres	46.94		Toronto, ON (CAN)	June 17, 2007	1049
4 × 100 metres relay	37.91		Khalifa International Stadium, Doha (QAT)	October 4, 2019	1233
4 × 200 metres relay	1:19.20		Gainesville, FL (USA)	April 2, 2016	1249
4 × 400 metres relay	3:09.18		Philadelphia, PA (USA)	April 23, 2010	1054
