= Blake Bartlett =

Bahamian sprinter

Personal information
- Nationality: Bahamian
- Born: 2 March 1993 (age 33) Freeport, Bahamas

Sport
- Sport: Running
- Event: Sprints

Achievements and titles
- Personal best(s): 100 m: 10.30 (Texas 2014); 200 m: 20.89 (Nassau 2012)
Medal record
Men's athletics
Representing the Bahamas
Pan American Junior Championships
Bronze medal – third place	2011 Miramar	4×100 m relay
CAC Junior Championships (Junior)
Silver medal – second place	2012 San Salvador	4×100 m relay
Bronze medal – third place	2012 San Salvador	100 m
Bronze medal – third place	2012 San Salvador	200 m
CARIFTA Games (Junior)
Gold medal – first place	2012 Hamilton	4×100 m relay
Silver medal – second place	2012 Hamilton	200 m

Blake Bartlett (born 2 March 1993) is a Bahamian sprinter.

Bartlett won a bronze medal in the 100 and 200 metres at the 2012 Central American and Caribbean Junior Championships in Athletics in San Salvador. He is From Freeport, Bahamas
