= Calesio Newman =

American athletics competitor

Personal information
- Born: August 20, 1986 (age 39)

Sport
- Sport: Athletics
- Event: Sprinting
Medal record
Representing United States
Pan American Games
Bronze medal – third place	2011 Guadalajara	4 x 100 m

Calesio Newman (born August 20, 1986) is an American former athlete who competed in sprinting.

Raised in Green Sea, South Carolina, Newman attended North Carolina A&T State University, where he is a former 100 meters record holder. He graduated in 2010.

Newman represented the United States at the 2011 Pan American Games in Guadalajara, claiming a bronze medal as part of the 4 × 100 m relay team, to go with a sixth-place finish in the 100 meters final. Track and Field News ranked him 10th in the world for the 200 meters in 2012. Competing in the 2012 Olympic trials, Newman narrowly missed out on a place for London after coming fourth in the 200 meters, with only the top three qualifying. He was a mere 0.01 seconds from third place. Other results include a fourth-place finish in the 200 meters at the 2012 Diamond League meet in Monaco and a 100 meters fourth at the 2013 IAAF World Challenge Beijing.
