= Allistar Clarke =

Saint Kitts and Nevis sprinter (born 1990)

Personal information
- Born: 3 October 1990 (age 35) Basseterre, Saint Kitts and Nevis

Sport
- Sport: Track and field

Allistar Clarke (born October 3, 1990) is a Saint Kittitian and Nevisian sprinter. Allistar Clarke made his debut at the 2013 IAFF World Championship. He was part of his country's team in the men's 4 × 100 metres relay race at the 2016 Summer Olympics.
