= Delwayne Delaney =

Saint Kitts and Nevis sprinter (born 1982)

Personal information
- Nationality: Saint Kitts and Nevis
- Born: 4 August 1982 (age 43) Basseterre

Sport
- Sport: Running
- Event(s): 100 metres, 200 metres

Achievements and titles
- Personal best(s): 100 m: 10.31 s (San Salvador 2007); 200 m: 20.83 s (San Salvador 2007)
Medal record
Representing Saint Kitts and Nevis
Men's athletics
Pan American Games
Silver medal – second place	2011 Guadalajara	4×100 m relay
Central American and Caribbean Championships
Bronze medal – third place	2008 Cali	4×100 m relay

Delwayne Delaney (born 4 August 1982) is a Saint Kitts and Nevis sprinter who specializes in the 100 metres.

Individually, he competed at the 2004 World Indoor Championships without progressing from the first round. With the Saint Kitts and Nevis 4 x 100 metres relay team he finished fifth at the 2003 Central American and Caribbean Championships.

His personal best times are 10.31 seconds in the 100 metres and 20.83 seconds in the 200 metres, both achieved in July 2007 in San Salvador.

Delaney originally ran for Paul Quinn College before transferring to Texas Christian University. He was an All-American sprinter for the TCU Horned Frogs track and field team, finishing runner-up in the 4 × 400 metres relay at the 2006 NCAA Division I Outdoor Track and Field Championships. While sprinting in Texas, Delaney got significant media attention in St. Kitts after his races.

== Achievements ==
Year	Competition	Venue	Position	Event	Notes
Representing Saint Kitts and Nevis
2002	Central American and Caribbean Games	San Salvador, El Salvador	5th (h)	100m	10.85 (wind: 1.3 m/s)
2004	NACAC U-23 Championships	Sherbrooke, Canada	10th (h)	100m	10.69 (wind: +0.0 m/s)
2004	NACAC U-23 Championships	Sherbrooke, Canada	9th (h)	200m	21.46 (wind: -1.4 m/s)
