= Athletics at the 2015 Pan American Games – Men's 4 × 100 metres relay =

Men's 4 × 100 metres relay at the 2015 Pan American Games
- Venue: CIBC Pan Am and Parapan Am Athletics Stadium
- Dates: July 24 – July 25
- Competitors: 53 from 12 nations
- Winning time: 38.27

Medalists
Gold medal	BeeJay Lee; Wallace Spearmon; Kendal Williams; Remontay McClain; Sean McLean	United States
Silver medal	Gustavo dos Santos; Vitor Hugo dos Santos; Bruno de Barros; Aldemir da Silva Junior	Brazil
Bronze medal	Rondel Sorrillo; Keston Bledman; Emmanuel Callender; Dan-Neil Telesford; Mikel Thomas	Trinidad and Tobago

The men's 4 × 100 metres relay sprint competition of the athletics events at the 2015 Pan American Games took place on July 24 and 25, 2015 at CIBC Pan Am and Parapan Am Athletics Stadium. The United States team, consisting of Sean McLean, Wallace Spearmon, Kendal Williams, and Remontay McClain were awarded the gold medal following the disqualification of Team Canada. Canada clearly won the race in lane 8, but before the final exchange, Aaron Brown began his acceleration by running in lane 7 before correcting and receiving the baton within the lane 8 exchange zone.

== Records ==
Prior to this competition, the existing world and Pan American Games records were as follows:

World record	Jamaica	37.04	Daegu, South Korea	September 4, 2011
Pan American Games record	Brazil	38.18	Guadalajara, Mexico	October 28, 2011

== Qualification ==
Each National Olympic Committee (NOC) ranked in the world's top 16 was able to enter one team.

== Schedule ==
Date	Time	Round
July 24, 2015	20:15	Semifinals
July 25, 2015	20:05	Final

== Results ==
All times shown are in seconds.

KEY:	q	Fastest non-qualifiers	Q	Qualified	NR	National record	PB	Personal best	SB	Seasonal best	DQ	Disqualified

=== Semifinals ===
Rank	Heat	Nation	Name	Time	Notes
1	1	Antigua and Barbuda	Chavaughn Walsh, Daniel Bailey, Cejhae Greene, Miguel Francis	38.14	Q, PR, NR
2	1	United States	Sean McLean, Wallace Spearmon, Kendal Williams, Remontay McClain	38.29	Q
3	1	Canada	Gavin Smellie, Aaron Brown, Dontae Richards-Kwok, Brendon Rodney	38.39	Q, SB
4	2	Trinidad and Tobago	Mikel Thomas, Rondel Sorrillo, Emmanuel Callender, Dan-Neil Telesford	38.52	Q
5	2	Barbados	Shane Brathwaite, Levi Cadogan, Nicholas Deshong, Burkheart Ellis	38.65	Q, NR
6	2	Dominican Republic	Stanly del Carmen, Yoandry Andujar, Deidy Montas, Yancarlos Martínez	38.67	Q, NR
7	1	Jamaica	Bernardo Brady, Dexter Lee, Oshane Bailey, Sheldon Mitchell	38.75	q
8	2	Brazil	Gustavo dos Santos, Vitor Hugo dos Santos, Aldemir da Silva Junior, Bruno de Barros	38.76	q
9	1	Saint Kitts and Nevis	Jason Rogers, Brijesh Lawrence, Lestrod Roland, Allistar Clarke	39.10	
10	2	Bahamas	Johnathan Farquharson, Teray Smith, Warren Fraser, Elroy McBride	39.53	
11	2	Cuba	Yaniel Carrero, Roberto Skyers, Reynier Mena, Reidis Ramos	39.61	
12	1	Chile	Franco Boccardo, Cristián Reyes, Enrique Polanco, Sebastián Valdivia	40.14	

=== Final ===
Rank	Nation	Name	Time	Notes
1st place, gold medalist(s)	United States	BeeJay Lee, Wallace Spearmon, Kendal Williams, Remontay McClain	38.27	
2nd place, silver medalist(s)	Brazil	Gustavo dos Santos, Vitor Hugo dos Santos, Bruno de Barros, Aldemir da Silva Junior	38.68	
3rd place, bronze medalist(s)	Trinidad and Tobago	Rondel Sorrillo, Keston Bledman, Emmanuel Callender, Dan-Neil Telesford	38.69	
4	Barbados	Nicholas Deshong, Levi Cadogan, Burkheart Ellis, Ramon Gittens	38.79	
5	Dominican Republic	Stanly del Carmen, Yoandry Andujar, Deidy Montas, Yancarlos Martínez	38.86	
	Jamaica	Jason Livermore, Dexter Lee, Bernardo Brady, Sheldon Mitchell	DNF	
	Antigua and Barbuda	Chavaughn Walsh, Daniel Bailey, Cejhae Greene, Miguel Francis	DSQ	
	Canada	Gavin Smellie, Andre De Grasse, Brendon Rodney, Aaron Brown	DSQ	

Canada won the race with a time of 38.06. However, the team was disqualified for leaving their lane, Rule 163.3; the team had faced similar incidents at the 2014 Commonwealth Games and the 2015 IAAF World Relays.
