= Athletics at the 2016 Summer Olympics – Men's 200 metres =

Men's 200 metres at the Games of the XXXI Olympiad
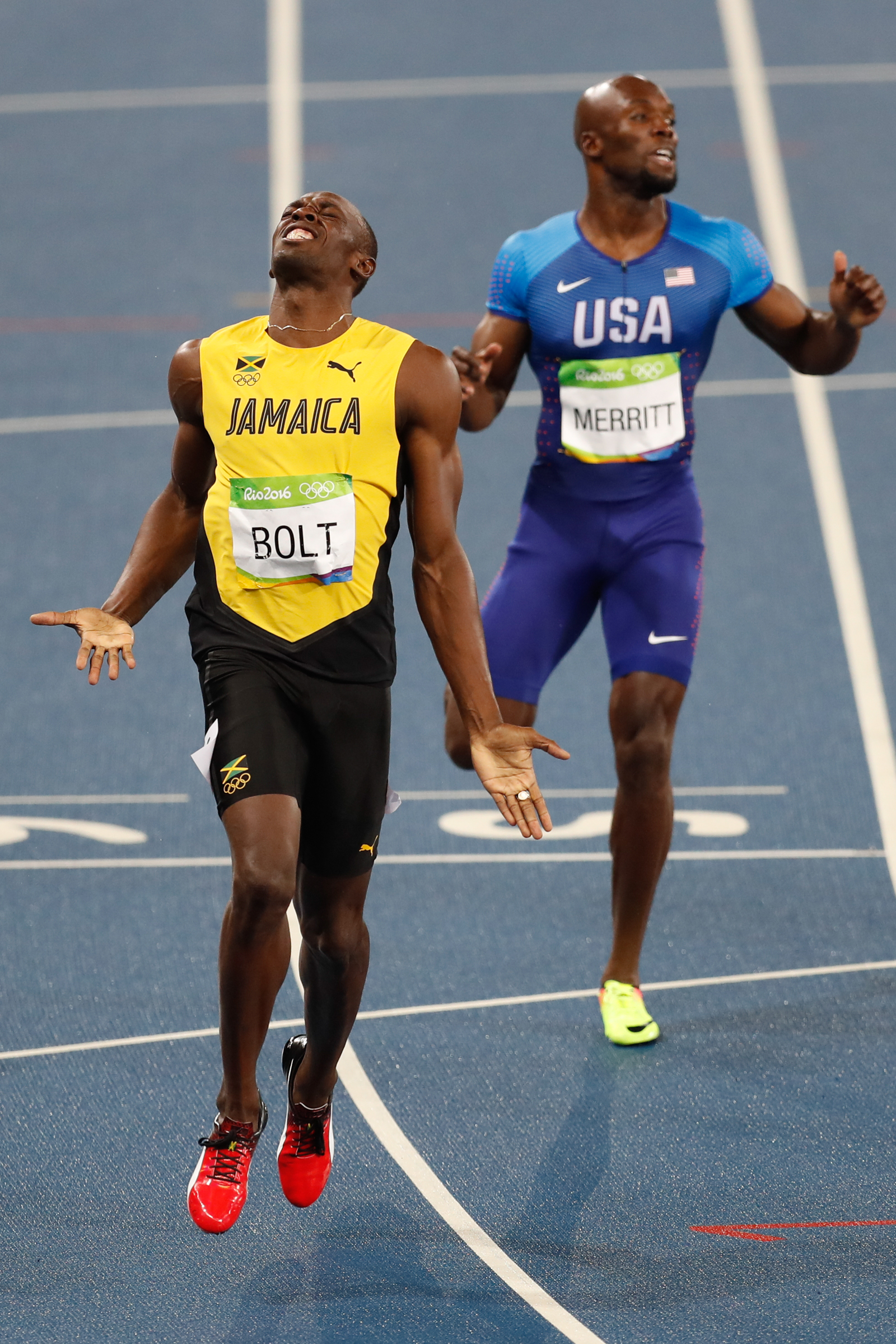
- Usain Bolt and LaShawn Merritt at finish
- Venue: Estádio Olímpico João Havelange
- Dates: 16 August 2016 (quarterfinals); 17 August 2016 (semifinals); 18 August 2016 (final)
- Competitors: 77 from 48 nations
- Winning time: 19.78

Medalists
1st place, gold medalist(s)		Usain Bolt; Jamaica
2nd place, silver medalist(s)		Andre De Grasse; Canada
3rd place, bronze medalist(s)		Christophe Lemaitre; France

Official Video Highlights

The men's 200 metres event at the 2016 Summer Olympics took place between 16–18 August in Rio de Janeiro, Brazil, at the Estádio Olímpico João Havelange. There were 77 competitors from 48 nations. The event was won by Usain Bolt of Jamaica, his third consecutive gold medal in the event. Bolt earned his eighth overall gold, needing only the 4×100 metres relay the next day to complete the sprint triple-triple. It was Jamaica's fourth victory in the event, second-most among nations. Andre De Grasse earned Canada's first medal in the event since 1928 with his silver; Christophe Lemaitre's bronze was France's first since 1960. The United States missed the podium for only the fifth time in the history of the men's 200 metres; it was the first time that it had done so in consecutive Games.

== Background ==
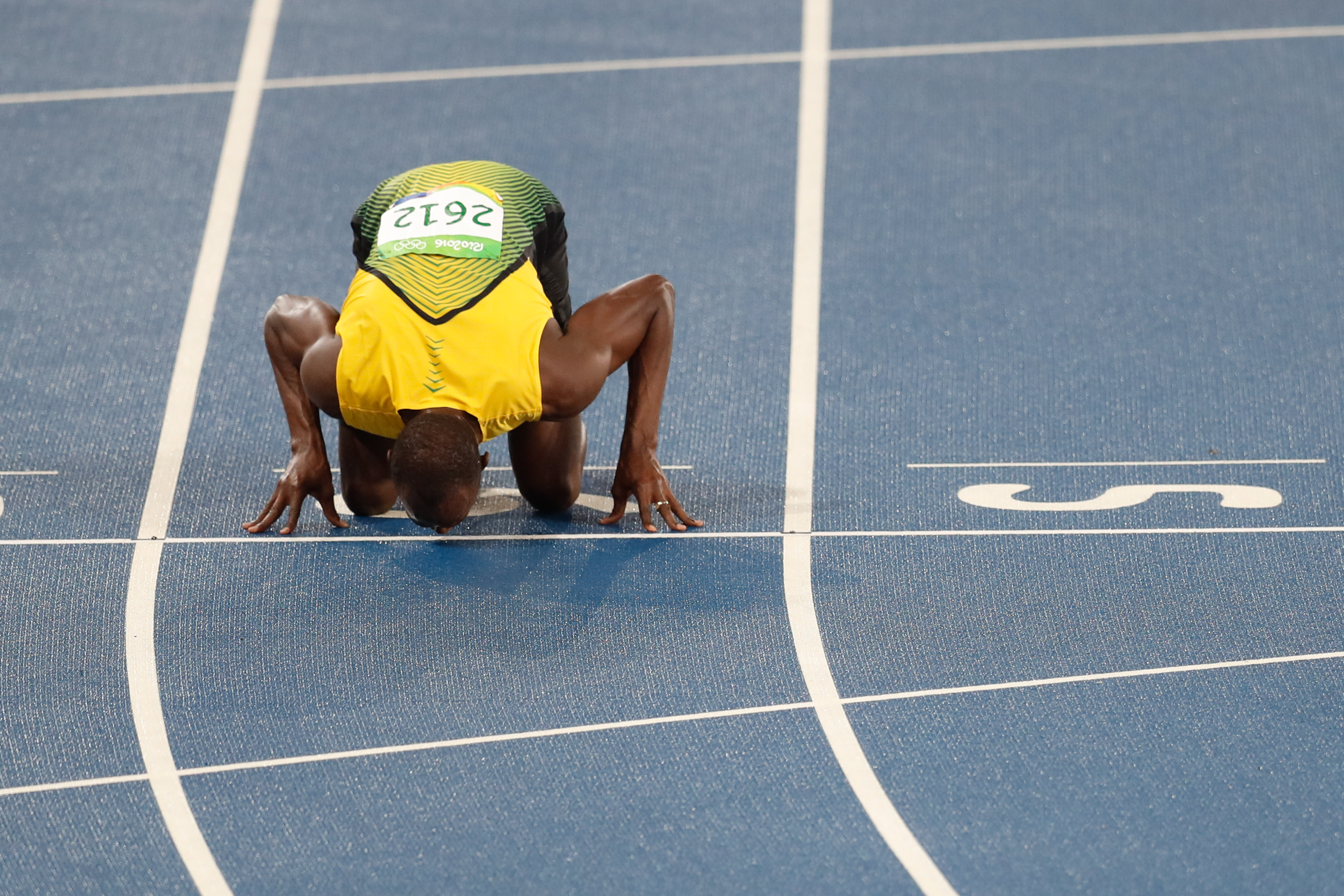
Bolt kisses the finish line after winning

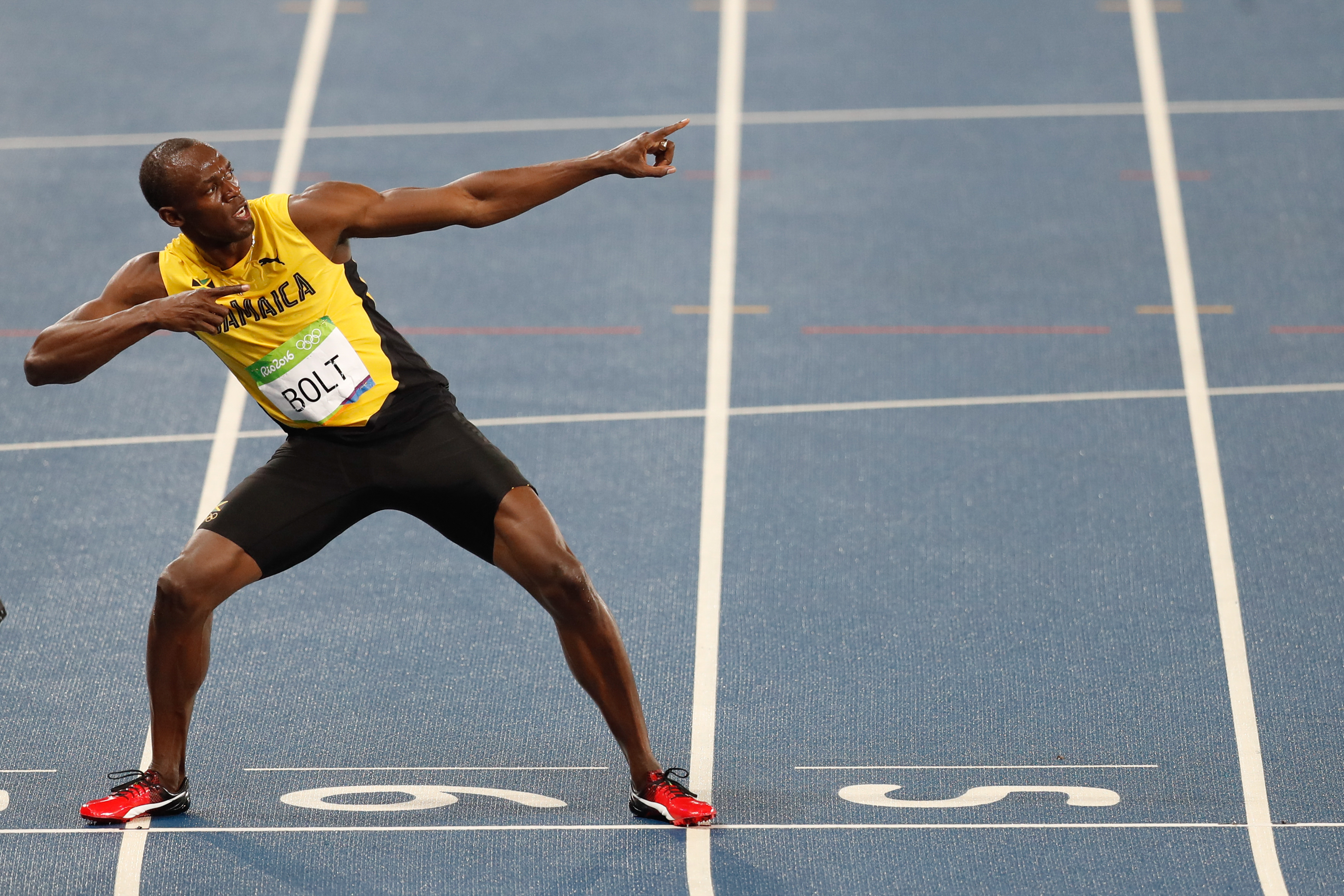
Bolt performing his famous "lightning bolt"

This was the 27th appearance of the event, which was not held at the first Olympics in 1896 but has been on the program ever since. Five of the eight finalists from the 2012 Games returned: two-time gold medalist Usain Bolt of Jamaica, silver medalist Yohan Blake of Jamaica, fifth-place finisher Churandy Martina of the Netherlands (who had finished second in 2008 before being disqualified for a lane violation), sixth-place finisher Christophe Lemaitre of France, and eighth-place finisher Anaso Jobodwana of South Africa.

After winning the 100 metres, 2012 Olympic champion and 2015 World Champion Bolt sought to become the first man to win three consecutive Olympic 200 metres titles (no other man had won even two), en route to the "Triple-Triple"; 100 metres, 200 metres and 4 × 100 metres relay gold medals at 3 consecutive Olympic Games. However, injuries in the early season prevented him from running any 200 metres races before the Jamaican Trials, where he pulled from the event due to an injury. Bolt filed a medical exemption and qualified for the Olympics by running 19.89 seconds in London, ranking him 5th in the year. Though unbeaten in the event since 2012, Bolt faced major opposition from a strong trio of Americans in LaShawn Merritt, Justin Gatlin, and Ameer Webb. Merritt, the 2008 Olympic Champion in the 400 metres, posted the 19.74 second world lead in the semifinals of the American Trials, while Gatlin, Bolt's main rival for the past 3 years, beat him in the final with the second fastest time of the year at 19.75 seconds. Webb clocked 19.85 seconds in Doha and won in Rome as well.

Bolt's training partners Blake and Miguel Francis of Antigua and Barbuda were entered, with Francis being ranked 4th at 19.88 seconds. Defending silver medalist Blake, the second fastest man in history and the only man to beat Bolt in the 200 metres since his world record, failed to go under 20 seconds in the season, still on the comeback from near-career ending injuries from 2013-2015. In Bolt's absence, he won the Jamaican Trials in a modest 20.29 seconds. Nickel Ashmeade rounded out the Jamaican trio while defending bronze medalist Warren Weir failed to make the team. Nethaneel Mitchell-Blake clocked a personal best of 19.95 seconds earlier in the season; Adam Gemili and Daniel Talbot filled out the British team. Brendon Rodney was the last one under 20 seconds in the season, leading Aaron Brown and Pan-American champion Andre De Grasse on the Canadian team. Others included in the conversation were Diamond League champion Alonso Edward of Panama, European Champion Bruno Hortelano of Spain, and 2012 European Champion Martina.

== Summary ==
De Grasse, fresh off his bronze in the 100 metres, led the quarterfinals with a very relaxed 20.09, throwing his hat into the ring as a potential challenger. Bolt eased to 20.28 seconds, while a sluggish Gatlin clocked 20.42 seconds. Surprise winners included Salem Eid Yaqoob, Jose Carlos Herrera, and Nery Brenes, while notable eliminations included Rodney, Asian record holder Femi Ogunode, and reigning world championship bronze medalist Anaso Jobodwana.

In the semifinal round, Merritt cruised to a sub-20 win in the first. 2011 bronze medalist Christophe Lemaitre finished second with his fastest time in 4 years. In the second semifinal, Bolt was prepared to cruise to victory until De Grasse suddenly rushed to Bolt's shoulder. The two friends laughed with each other to the line, with Bolt clocking a season's best 19.78 seconds and De Grasse breaking his Canadian record with 19.80 seconds. As Bud Winter, the sprint coach who influenced Glen Mills, Bolt's coach, would say; "Relax and win." Webb meanwhile, was left behind in 6th. Drama unfolded in the third semifinal, with both major contenders Gatlin and Blake failing to qualify. Instead, Alonso Edward led the way with Churandy Martina making a late rush for the second spot. Gatlin maintained a lead up until the homestretch, while Blake never got close to contention and finished a surprising 6th.

The final was held following a light rainstorm that affected the women's javelin throw. The track was still wet and conditions cooler. Still the stadium was electric to see lightning, the star Usain Bolt in what was expected to be his last individual race in the Olympics. Bolt was in lane 6, playing to the camera and to the crowd before the race. Lemaitre and Martina were to his outside, while Merritt and De Grasse, now in major contention, to his inside. Bolt got a good start and quickly made up the stagger on Lemaitre then Martina halfway through the turn. He led by a meter by the time they came into the homestretch, and after extending it to 2.5 metres, there was no challenge and Bolt was home free from a wall of chasers. Behind him, De Grasse started to pull away from the pack, Merritt started to lag, and Gemili and Martina were in contention for the bronze, with Lemaitre beginning to make a late charge. Bolt, however, was clear and away, gritting his teeth hard in an attempt to close on his world record. He hit the line in 19.78 seconds, equaling his time from the semifinals, visibly disappointed. Still though, the crowd lit up in excitement to see Bolt make history once again. Meanwhile, De Grasse cruised to the silver while Gemili, Lemaitre, and Martina all hit the line together in a dead heat for the bronze medal.

Bolt made his goal of being the first man in history to win 3 consecutive Olympic golds in the 200 metres. He also completed the "Triple-Double" with his 100 metres golds as well, and was now one race away from completing the historic "Triple-Triple". As Bolt celebrated, the crowd lit up as Lemaitre was revealed to be the bronze medalist, pipping Gemili by 3 thousandths and Martina by another 3. A heartbroken Gemili laid on the track in tears, then joined his fellow European athletes. The final was one of the slowest in nearly 2 decades, likely due to the rainy conditions. Every athlete other than Bolt was nearly a tenth slower than they were in the semifinals, and only Bolt went under 20 seconds.

After the race, Bolt celebrated his last individual victory, kissing the finish line and striking the lightning bolt pose.

In the victory ceremony, the medals for the competition were presented by Sir Philip Craven, Great Britain, member of the International Olympic Committee and president of the International Paralympic Committee, and the gifts were presented by Adille Sumariwalla, Council Member of the IAAF.

== Qualification ==
A National Olympic Committee (NOC) could enter up to 3 qualified athletes in the men's 200 metres event if all athletes meet the entry standard during the qualifying period. (The limit of 3 has been in place since the 1930 Olympic Congress.) The qualifying standard was 20.50 seconds. The qualifying period was from 1 May 2015 to 11 July 2016. The qualifying time standards could be obtained in various meets during the given period that have the approval of the IAAF. Only outdoor meets were eligible for the sprints and short hurdles, including the 200 metres. NOCs could also use their universality place—each NOC could enter one male athlete regardless of time if they had no male athletes meeting the entry standard for an athletics event—in the 200 metres.

== Competition format ==
The competition featured three rounds: a quarterfinals stage with ten races, three semifinal races, and a single final. Each race featured eight athletes. The top two from each quarterfinal and the next four fastest overall progressed to the semifinals. The top two finishers in each of the three semifinals reach the final, alongside the next two fastest overall.

== Records ==
Prior to this competition, the existing global and area records were as follows:

Global records before the 2016 Summer Olympics
Record	Athlete (Nation)	Time (s)	Location	Date
World record	Usain Bolt (JAM)	19.19	Berlin, Germany	20 August 2009
Olympic record	Usain Bolt (JAM)	19.30	Beijing, China	20 August 2008
World leading	LaShawn Merritt (USA)	19.74	Eugene, Oregon, United States	8 July 2016

Area records before the 2016 Summer Olympics
Area	Time (s)	Wind	Athlete	Nation
Africa (records)	19.68	+0.4	Frank Fredericks	Namibia
Asia (records)	19.97	−0.4	Femi Ogunode	Qatar
Europe (records)	19.72	+1.8	Pietro Mennea	Italy
North, Central America and Caribbean (records)	19.19 WR	−0.3	Usain Bolt	Jamaica
Oceania (records)	20.06	+0.9	Peter Norman	Australia
South America (records)	19.81	−0.3	Alonso Edward	Panama

The following national records were established during the competition:

Nation	Athlete	Round	Time	Notes
Spain	Bruno Hortelano	Heats	20.12	
Bahrain	Salem Eid Yaqoob	Heats	20.19	
Liberia	Emmanuel Matadi	Heats	20.49	
Swaziland	Sibusiso Matsenjwa	Heats	20.63	
Costa Rica	Nery Brenes	Semifinals	20.20	
Canada	Andre de Grasse	Semifinals	19.80	

== Schedule ==
All times are Brasilia Time (UTC-3)

Date	Time	Round
Tuesday, 16 August 2016	11:50	Quarterfinals
Wednesday, 17 August 2016	22:00	Semifinals
Thursday, 18 August 2016	22:30	Final

== Results ==
=== Quarterfinals ===
Qualification rules: First 2 in each heat (Q) and the next 4 fastest (q) advance to the semifinals.

==== Quarterfinal 1 ====
Rank	Lane	Athlete	Nation	Reaction	Time	Notes
1	6	Alonso Edward	Panama	0.137	20.19	Q
2	2	Daniel Talbot	Great Britain	0.143	20.27	Q, PB
3	8	Lykourgos-Stefanos Tsakonas	Greece	0.161	20.31	q, SB
4	7	Femi Ogunode	Qatar	0.167	20.36	
5	3	Jeremy Dodson	Samoa	0.144	20.51	
6	4	Jak Ali Harvey	Turkey	0.139	20.58	SB
7	5	Mosito Lehata	Lesotho	0.162	20.65	SB
–	1	Demetrius Pinder	Bahamas	—	DQ	R 162.7
				Wind: +0.7 m/s		

==== Quarterfinal 2 ====
Rank	Lane	Athlete	Nation	Reaction	Time	Notes
1	8	Bruno Hortelano	Spain	0.161	20.12	Q, NR
2	6	Yohan Blake	Jamaica	0.166	20.13	Q, SB
3	4	Ameer Webb	United States	0.157	20.31	q
4	3	Anaso Jobodwana	South Africa	0.175	20.53	
5	7	Robin Erewa	Germany	0.197	20.61	
6	2	Emmanuel Dasor	Ghana	0.164	20.65	
7	5	Shavez Hart	Bahamas	0.151	20.74	SB
8	1	Bernardo Baloyes	Colombia	0.200	20.78	
				Wind: −0.2 m/s		

==== Quarterfinal 3 ====
Rank	Lane	Athlete	Nation	Reaction	Time	Notes
1	5	Salem Eid Yaqoob	Bahrain	0.167	20.19	Q, NR
2	6	Ramil Guliyev	Turkey	0.148	20.23	Q, SB
3	2	Aaron Brown	Canada	0.127	20.23	q
4	3	Shōta Iizuka	Japan	0.163	20.49	
5	8	Emmanuel Matadi	Liberia	0.219	20.49	NR
6	4	Sibusiso Matsenjwa	Swaziland	0.196	20.63	NR
7	7	Levi Cadogan	Barbados	0.186	21.02	
8	1	Tega Odele	Nigeria	0.130	21.25	
				Wind: +0.3 m/s		

==== Quarterfinal 4 ====
Rank	Lane	Athlete	Nation	Reaction	Time	Notes
1	3	José Carlos Herrera	Mexico	0.143	20.29	Q
2	8	Roberto Skyers	Cuba	0.149	20.44	Q
3	6	Jorge Vides	Brazil	0.176	20.50	
4	4	Tlotliso Leotlela	South Africa	0.161	20.59	
5	1	Eseosa Desalu	Italy	0.130	20.65	
6	7	Teray Smith	Bahamas	0.175	20.66	
7	2	Didier Kiki	Benin	0.152	22.27	
–	5	Miguel Francis	Antigua and Barbuda	—	DNS	
				Wind: 0.0 m/s		

==== Quarterfinal 5 ====
Rank	Lane	Athlete	Nation	Reaction	Time	Notes
1	4	Justin Gatlin	United States	0.154	20.42	Q
2	6	Matteo Galvan	Italy	0.171	20.58	Q
3	5	Ramon Gittens	Barbados	0.144	20.58	
4	2	Serhiy Smelyk	Ukraine	0.182	20.66	
5	7	Aleixo-Platini Menga	Germany	0.136	20.80	
6	8	Kenji Fujimitsu	Japan	0.159	20.86	
7	3	Yancarlos Martínez	Dominican Republic	0.132	20.97	
				Wind: –1.5 m/s		

==== Quarterfinal 6 ====
Rank	Lane	Athlete	Nation	Reaction	Time	Notes
1	5	Nickel Ashmeade	Jamaica	0.124	20.15	Q
2	2	Adam Gemili	Great Britain	0.153	20.20	Q
3	8	Clarence Munyai	South Africa	0.148	20.66	
4	4	Burkheart Ellis	Barbados	0.186	20.74	
5	1	Alex Hartmann	Australia	0.169	21.02	
6	7	Tatenda Tsumba	Zimbabwe	0.159	21.04	
7	6	Rolando Palacios	Honduras	0.187	21.32	
8	3	Theo Piniau	Papua New Guinea	0.175	22.14	
				Wind: +0.4 m/s		

==== Quarterfinal 7 ====
Rank	Lane	Athlete	Nation	Reaction	Time	Notes
1	8	Nery Brenes	Costa Rica	0.178	20.20	Q, NR
2	3	Churandy Martina	Netherlands	0.150	20.29	Q
3	4	Brendon Rodney	Canada	0.169	20.34	
4	6	Davide Manenti	Italy	0.145	20.51	
5	7	Adama Jammeh	The Gambia	0.182	20.55	
6	5	Harold Houston	Bermuda	0.117	20.85	
7	1	Fabrice Dabla	Togo	0.156	21.63	
–	2	Mike Nyang'au	Kenya	—	DNS	
				Wind: +0.2 m/s		

==== Quarterfinal 8 ====
Rank	Lane	Athlete	Nation	Reaction	Time	Notes
1	3	LaShawn Merritt	United States	0.162	20.15	Q
2	2	Christophe Lemaitre	France	0.171	20.28	Q
3	4	Julian Reus	Germany	0.138	20.39	SB
4	7	Reynier Mena	Cuba	0.123	20.42	
5	8	Karol Zalewski	Poland	0.151	20.54	
6	6	Bruno de Barros	Brazil	0.154	20.59	
7	5	Ihor Bodrov	Ukraine	0.180	20.86	
8	1	Carvin Nkanata	Kenya	0.213	21.43	
				Wind: +0.4 m/s		

==== Quarterfinal 9 ====
Rank	Lane	Athlete	Nation	Reaction	Time	Notes
1	5	Usain Bolt	Jamaica	0.177	20.28	Q
2	8	Ejowvokoghene Oduduru	Nigeria	0.141	20.34	Q, PB
3	3	Solomon Bockarie	Netherlands	0.136	20.42	SB
4	7	Kyle Greaux	Trinidad and Tobago	0.147	20.61	SB
5	4	Jonathan Borlée	Belgium	0.162	20.64	
6	2	Kei Takase	Japan	0.153	20.71	
7	1	Ahmed Ali	Sudan	0.153	20.78	
7	6	Jaysuma Saidy Ndure	Norway	0.150	20.78	
				Wind: +0.6 m/s		

==== Quarterfinal 10 ====
Rank	Lane	Athlete	Nation	Reaction	Time	Notes
1	5	Andre De Grasse	Canada	0.137	20.09	Q, SB
2	1	Nethaneel Mitchell-Blake	Great Britain	0.146	20.24	Q
3	7	Rondel Sorrillo	Trinidad and Tobago	0.124	20.27	q, SB
4	8	Hua Wilfried Koffi	Ivory Coast	0.159	20.48	SB
5	6	Antoine Adams	Saint Kitts and Nevis	0.141	20.49	
6	3	Stanly del Carmen	Dominican Republic	0.133	20.55	
7	2	Aldemir da Silva Júnior	Brazil	0.144	20.80	
8	4	Brandon Jones	Belize	0.160	21.49	SB
				Wind: +1.0 m/s		

=== Semifinals ===
Qualification rules: First 2 in each heat (Q) and the next 2 fastest (q) advance to the final.

==== Semifinal 1 ====
Rank	Lane	Athlete	Nation	Reaction	Time	Notes
1	6	LaShawn Merritt	United States	0.166	19.94	Q
2	8	Christophe Lemaitre	France	0.125	20.01	Q, SB
3	7	Daniel Talbot	Great Britain	0.153	20.25	PB
4	4	Nickel Ashmeade	Jamaica	0.134	20.31	
5	1	Rondel Sorrillo	Trinidad and Tobago	0.132	20.33	
6	3	Nery Brenes	Costa Rica	0.165	20.33	
7	2	Aaron Brown	Canada	0.173	20.37	
8	5	José Carlos Herrera	Mexico	0.150	20.48	
				Wind: −0.4 m/s		

==== Semifinal 2 ====
Rank	Lane	Athlete	Nation	Reaction	Time	Notes
1	4	Usain Bolt	Jamaica	0.156	19.78	Q, SB
2	5	Andre De Grasse	Canada	0.130	19.80	Q, NR
3	6	Adam Gemili	Great Britain	0.142	20.08	q
4	8	Ramil Guliyev	Turkey	0.157	20.09	q, SB
5	2	Ameer Webb	United States	0.192	20.43	
5	3	Salem Eid Yaqoob	Bahrain	0.143	20.43	
7	7	Ejowvokoghene Oduduru	Nigeria	0.147	20.59	
8	1	Roberto Skyers	Cuba	0.156	20.60	
				Wind: −0.3 m/s		

==== Semifinal 3 ====
Rank	Lane	Athlete	Nation	Reaction	Time	Notes
1	5	Alonso Edward	Panama	0.140	20.07	Q
2	8	Churandy Martina	Netherlands	0.147	20.10	Q, SB
3	2	Justin Gatlin	United States	0.137	20.13	
4	4	Bruno Hortelano	Spain	0.142	20.16	
5	7	Nethaneel Mitchell-Blake	Great Britain	0.196	20.25	
6	6	Yohan Blake	Jamaica	0.151	20.37	
7	1	Lykourgos-Stefanos Tsakonas	Greece	0.159	20.63	
8	3	Matteo Galvan	Italy	0.149	20.88	
				Wind: −0.2 m/s		

=== Final ===
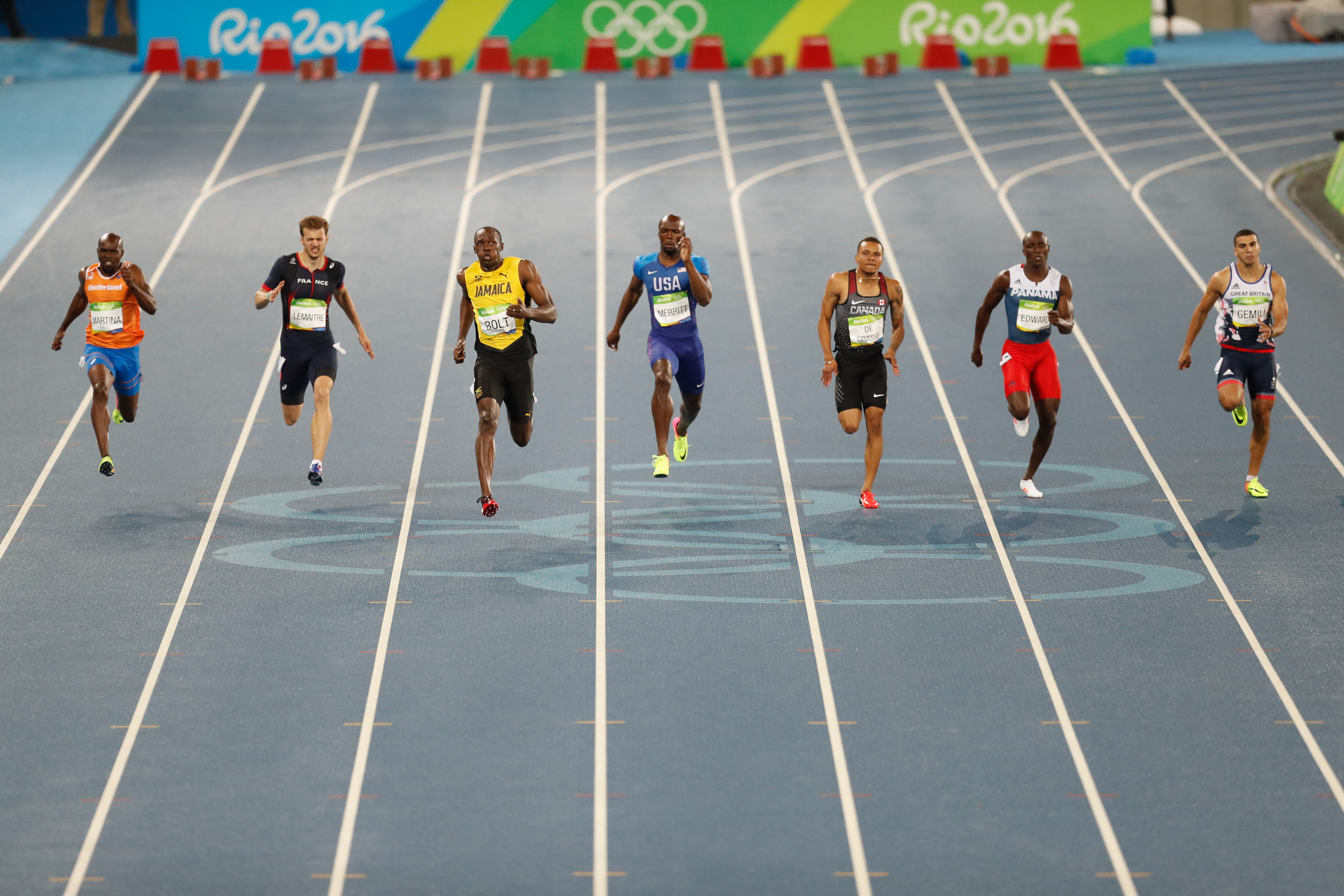
Mid- straightaway, 200 metres final

Rank	Lane	Athlete	Nation	Reaction	Time	Notes
1st place, gold medalist(s)	6	Usain Bolt	Jamaica	0.156	19.78	SB
2nd place, silver medalist(s)	4	Andre De Grasse	Canada	0.141	20.02	
3rd place, bronze medalist(s)	7	Christophe Lemaitre	France	0.153	20.12	.116
4	2	Adam Gemili	Great Britain	0.178	20.12	.119
5	8	Churandy Martina	Netherlands	0.148	20.13	.122
6	5	LaShawn Merritt	United States	0.189	20.19	
7	3	Alonso Edward	Panama	0.162	20.23	
8	1	Ramil Guliyev	Turkey	0.141	20.43	
				Wind: −0.5 m/s		
