= 2015 IAAF World Relays – Men's 4 × 100 metres relay =

Men's 4 × 100 metres relay at the 2015 IAAF World Relays
- Venue: Thomas Robinson Stadium
- Dates: 2 May (heats & final)
- Nations: 24
- Winning time: 37.38

Medalists
gold medal	Mike Rodgers; Justin Gatlin; Tyson Gay; Ryan Bailey; United States
silver medal	Nesta Carter; Kemar Bailey-Cole; Nickel Ashmeade; Usain Bolt; Jamaica
bronze medal	Kazuma Oseto; Kenji Fujimitsu; Yoshihide Kiryū; Kotaro Taniguchi; Japan

The men's 4 × 100 metres relay at the 2015 IAAF World Relays was held at the Thomas Robinson Stadium on 2 May.

== Records ==
Prior to the competition, the records were as follows:

World record	Jamaica (Nesta Carter, Michael Frater, Yohan Blake, Usain Bolt)	36.84	(United Kingdom) London, Great Britain	11 August 2012
Championship record	Jamaica (Nesta Carter, Kemar Bailey-Cole, Julian Forte, Andrew Fisher)	37.71	(The Bahamas) Nassau, Bahamas	25 May 2014
World Leading	United States	38.18	Gainesville, United States	4 April 2015
African Record	Nigeria (Osmond Ezinwa, Olapade Adeniken, Francis Obikwelu, Davidson Ezinwa)	37.94	Athens, Greece	9 August 1997
Asian Record	China (Chen Shiwei, Xie Zhenye, Su Bingtian, Zhang Peimeng)	37.99	Incheon, South Korea	2 October 2014
North, Central American and Caribbean record	Jamaica (Nesta Carter, Michael Frater, Yohan Blake, Usain Bolt)	36.84	(United Kingdom) London, Great Britain	11 August 2012
South American Record	Brazil (Vicente de Lima, Édson Ribeiro, André da Silva, Claudinei da Silva)	37.90	Sydney, Australia	30 September 2000
European Record	Great Britain (Jason Gardener, Darren Campbell, Marlon Devonish, Dwain Chambers)	37.73	Seville, Spain	29 August 1999
Oceanian record	Australia (Paul Henderson, Tim Jackson, Steve Brimacombe, Damien Marsh)	38.17	Gothenburg, Sweden	12 August 1995
Oceanian record	Australia (Anthony Alozie, Isaac Ntiamoah, Andrew McCabe, Josh Ross)	38.17	(United Kingdom) London, Great Britain	10 August 2012

== Schedule ==
Date	Time	Round
2 May 2014	19:40	Heats
2 May 2014	21:30	Final B
2 May 2014	21:56	Final

All times are local times (UTC-4)

== Results ==
KEY:	q	Fastest non-qualifiers	Q	Qualified	WL	World leading	CR	Championship record	NR	National record	SB	Seasonal best

=== Heats ===
Qualification: First 2 of each heat (Q) plus the 2 fastest times (q) advanced to the final.

Rank	Heat	Lane	Nation	Athletes	Time	Notes
1	3	7	United States	Mike Rodgers, Justin Gatlin, Tyson Gay, Ryan Bailey	37.87	Q, WL
2	1	8	Jamaica	Nesta Carter, Kemar Bailey-Cole, Nickel Ashmeade, Usain Bolt	38.07	Q, WL
3	2	7	Trinidad and Tobago	Keston Bledman, Marc Burns, Rondel Sorrillo, Richard Thompson	38.32	Q, SB
4	2	3	France	Pierre Vincent, Christophe Lemaitre, Pierre-Alexis Pessonneaux, Emmanuel Biron	38.62	Q, SB
5	1	1	Brazil	Bruno de Barros, Vítor Hugo dos Santos, Aldemir da Silva Junior, Jorge Vides	38.64	Q, SB
6	2	6	Saint Kitts and Nevis	Jason Rogers, Brijesh Lawrence, Lestrod Roland, Antoine Adams	38.68	q, SB
7	3	1	Japan	Kazuma Oseto, Kenji Fujimitsu, Yoshihide Kiryū, Kotaro Taniguchi	38.73	Q, SB
7	1	6	Germany	Aleixo-Platini Menga, Sven Knipphals, Alexander Kosenkow, Patrick Domogala	38.73	q, SB
9	2	2	Great Britain	Sean Safo-Antwi, Daniel Talbot, James Ellington, Richard Kilty	38.79	SB
10	3	8	Italy	Fabio Cerutti, Eseosa Desalu, Diego Marani, Delmas Obou	38.84	SB
11	2	1	Barbados	Levi Cadogan, Ramon Gittens, Nicholas Deshong, Mario Burke	38.85	NR
11	2	4	Cuba	Yaniel Carrero, Roberto Skyers, Reynier Mena, Yadier Luis	38.85	SB
13	3	3	Dominican Republic	Gustavo Cuesta, Yoandry Andujar, Stanly del Carmen, Yancarlos Martínez	38.94	NR
14	1	3	Antigua and Barbuda	Chavaughn Walsh, Daniel Bailey, Tahir Walsh, Miguel Francis	39.01	NR
15	1	2	Netherlands	Brian Mariano, Churandy Martina, Giovanni Codrington, Hensley Paulina	39.14	SB
16	1	4	Bahamas	Deneko Brown, Blake Bartlett, Javan Martin, Alfred Higgs	39.32	SB
17	2	5	Hong Kong	Tang Yik Chun, So Chun Hong, Ng Ka Fung, Tsui Chi Ho	39.33	SB
18	1	7	Portugal	Diogo Antunes, Francis Obikwelu, David Lima, Yazaldes Nascimento	39.42	SB
19	3	6	Poland	Adam Pawłowski, Dariusz Kuć, Kamil Masztak, Remigiusz Olszewski	39.48	SB
20	3	5	Australia	Trae Williams, Alexander Hartmann, Jin Su Jung, Ben Jaworski	39.75	
21	3	4	China	Wu Zhiqiang, Xie Zhenye, Yang Yang, Mo Youxue	57.98	
	2	8	Switzerland	Pascal Mancini, Reto Schenkel, Alex Wilson, Rolf Malcolm Fongué	DNF	
	3	2	Canada	Gavin Smellie, Aaron Brown, Akeem Haynes, Justyn Warner	DQ	170.6
	1	5	Nigeria		DNS	

=== Final B ===
The final B was started at 21:35.

Rank	Lane	Nation	Athletes	Time	Notes
1	4	Great Britain	Andrew Robertson, Daniel Talbot, James Ellington, Richard Kilty	38.67	SB
2	5	Barbados	Levi Cadogan, Ramon Gittens, Nicholas Deshong, Mario Burke	38.70	NR
3	7	Dominican Republic	Deidy Montas, Yoandry Andujar, Stanly del Carmen, Yancarlos Martínez	38.98	
4	3	Cuba	Reidis Ramos, Roberto Skyers, Reynier Mena, Yaniel Carrero	39.04	
5	6	Italy	Fabio Cerutti, Eseosa Desalu, Matteo Galvan, Delmas Obou	39.23	
6	8	Antigua and Barbuda	Chavaughn Walsh, Daniel Bailey, Tahir Walsh, Miguel Francis	39.25	
7	1	Netherlands	Brian Mariano, Churandy Martina, Giovanni Codrington, Hensley Paulina	39.41	
8	2	Bahamas	Deneko Brown, Blake Bartlett, Javan Martin, Alfred Higgs	39.56	

=== Final ===
The final was started at 22:07.

Rank	Lane	Nation	Athletes	Time	Notes
1st place, gold medalist(s)	5	United States	Mike Rodgers, Justin Gatlin, Tyson Gay, Ryan Bailey	37.38	CR
2nd place, silver medalist(s)	4	Jamaica	Nesta Carter, Kemar Bailey-Cole, Nickel Ashmeade, Usain Bolt	37.68	SB
3rd place, bronze medalist(s)	7	Japan	Kazuma Oseto, Kenji Fujimitsu, Yoshihide Kiryū, Kotaro Taniguchi	38.20	SB
4	8	Brazil	Bruno de Barros, Vítor Hugo dos Santos, Aldemir da Silva Junior, Jorge Vides	38.63	SB
5	3	France	Pierre Vincent, Christophe Lemaitre, Pierre-Alexis Pessonneaux, Emmanuel Biron	38.81	
6	2	Saint Kitts and Nevis	Jason Rogers, Brijesh Lawrence, Lestrod Roland, Antoine Adams	38.85	
7	6	Trinidad and Tobago	Keston Bledman, Marc Burns, Rondel Sorrillo, Richard Thompson	38.92	
8	1	Germany	Aleixo-Platini Menga, Sven Knipphals, Alexander Kosenkow, Patrick Domogala	39.40	
