= Yaniel Carrero =

Cuban sprinter (born 1995)

Personal information
- Full name: Yaniel Carrero Zambrano
- Born: 17 August 1995 (age 30) Trinidad, Cuba

Sport
- Country: Cuba
- Sport: Athletics
- Events: 100 m, 4 × 100m Relay
Medal record
Men's athletics
Representing Cuba
Pan American Games
Silver medal – second place	2023 Santiago	4x100 m relay
Central American and Caribbean Games
Gold medal – first place	2014 Xalapa	4x100 m relay
Bronze medal – third place	2014 Xalapa	100 m
- Updated on 13 August 2015

Yaniel Carrero Zambrano (born 17 August 1995) is a Cuban sprinter who specializes in the 100 metres.

== Career ==
He won a gold medal in the 4 x 100 metres relay and a bronze medal 100 m at the 2014 Central American and Caribbean Championships.

His personal best time is 10.26 seconds, achieved in May 2015 in Havana. He also has 20.81 seconds in the 200 metres, achieved in June 2013 in Havana.

== Personal best ==
- 100 m: 10.24 s (wind: +0.1 m/s) – Havana, Cuba, 18 March 2016
- 200 m: 20.81 s (wind: +1.2 m/s) – Havana, Cuba, 4 June 2013

== Achievements ==
Year	Competition	Venue	Position	Event	Notes
Representing Cuba
2014	World Relays	Nassau, Bahamas	10th (B)	4 × 100 m relay	38.60
2014	World Junior Championships	Eugene, United States	18th (sf)	100m	10.70 (wind: -1.6 m/s)
2014	World Junior Championships	Eugene, United States	34th (h)	200m	21.49 (wind: -0.3 m/s)
2014	Central American and Caribbean Games	Xalapa, Mexico	3rd	100m	10.28 A (wind: +0.9 m/s)
2014	Central American and Caribbean Games	Xalapa, Mexico	1st	4 × 100 m relay	38.94 A
2015	World Relays	Nassau, Bahamas	12th (B)	4 × 100 m relay	39.04
2015	Pan American Games	Toronto, Canada	11th (h)	4 × 100 m relay	39.61
2016	Ibero-American Championships	Rio de Janeiro, Brazil	9th (sf)	100 m	10.41
2016	Ibero-American Championships	Rio de Janeiro, Brazil	3rd	4 × 100 m relay	38.93
2016	NACAC U23 Championships	San Salvador, El Salvador	12th (h)	200 m	21.48
2016	Olympic Games	Rio de Janeiro, Brazil	13th (h)	4 × 100 m relay	38.47
2017	World Championships	London, United Kingdom	13th (h)	4 × 100 m relay	39.01
2023	Pan American Games	Santiago, Chile	2nd	4 × 100 m relay	39.26
