= Reynier Mena =

Cuban sprinter

- Mena at the 2026 Weltklasse Zürich

Personal information
- Full name: Reynier Mena Berenguer
- Born: 21 November 1996 (age 29) Havana, Cuba
- Height: 1.74 m (5 ft 9 in)
- Weight: 79 kg (174 lb)

Sport
- Sport: Athletics
- Events: 100 metres, 200 metres
- Club: Benfica
Medal record
Representing Cuba
Pan American Junior Championships
Gold medal – first place	2015 Edmonton	100 m
Silver medal – second place	2015 Edmonton	200 m

Reynier Mena Berenguer (born 21 November 1996) is a Cuban sprinter. He competed in the 200 metres at the 2015 World Championships and 2016 Olympics.

On 3 July 2022, Mena set massive personal bests in both the 100 metres, joining the sub-10-second club with a 9.99, and in the 200 metres with a 19.63 that suddenly sent him into the top 10 performers of all time. That time now ranks as the twelfth fastest of all time, tied with Xavier Carter.

== International competitions ==
Year	Competition	Venue	Position	Event	Notes
Representing Cuba
2013	World Youth Championships	Donetsk, Ukraine	3rd	100 m	10.37
2013	World Youth Championships	Donetsk, Ukraine	3rd	200 m	20.79
2013	Pan American Junior Championships	Medellín, Colombia	7th	100 m	10.58
2013	Pan American Junior Championships	Medellín, Colombia	2nd	200 m	20.63
2014	IAAF World Relays	Nassau, Bahamas	2nd (B)	4 × 100 m relay	38.60
2014	World Junior Championships	Eugene, United States	11th (sf)	200 m	20.81
2014	World Junior Championships	Eugene, United States	11th (h)	4 × 400 m relay	3:10.60
2014	Central American and Caribbean Games	Xalapa, Mexico	2nd	200 m	20.54
2014	Central American and Caribbean Games	Xalapa, Mexico	1st	4 × 100 m relay	38.94
2015	IAAF World Relays	Nassau, Bahamas	4th (B)	4 × 100 m relay	39.04
2015	Pan American Games	Toronto, Canada	12th (sf)	100 m	10.23 (w)
2015	Pan American Games	Toronto, Canada	10th (sf)	200 m	20.32
2015	Pan American Games	Toronto, Canada	11th (h)	4 × 100 m relay	39.61
2015	Pan American Junior Championships	Edmonton, Canada	1st	100 m	10.17
2015	Pan American Junior Championships	Edmonton, Canada	2nd	200 m	20.34
2015	World Championships	Beijing, China	22nd (sf)	200 m	20.56
2016	Ibero-American Championships	Rio de Janeiro, Brazil	6th	200 m	20.73
2016	Ibero-American Championships	Rio de Janeiro, Brazil	3rd	4 × 100 m relay	38.93
2016	NACAC U23 Championships	San Salvador, El Salvador	1st	200 m	20.41
2016	Olympic Games	Rio de Janeiro, Brazil	25th (h)	200 m	20.42
2016	Olympic Games	Rio de Janeiro, Brazil	13th (h)	4 × 100 m relay	38.47
2017	IAAF World Relays	Nassau, Bahamas	5th (B)	4 × 100 m relay	39.90
2018	Central American and Caribbean Games	Barranquilla, Colombia	7th	100 m	10.36
2018	Central American and Caribbean Games	Barranquilla, Colombia	6th	200 m	20.60
2018	Central American and Caribbean Games	Barranquilla, Colombia	5th	4 × 100 m relay	39.03
2018	NACAC Championships	Toronto, Canada	10th (h)	100 m	10.30
2018	Ibero-American Championships	Trujillo, Peru	3rd	100 m	10.47
2019	Pan American Games	Lima, Peru	11th (h)	100 m	10.43
2019	Pan American Games	Lima, Peru	5th	200 m	20.62
2019	Pan American Games	Lima, Peru	7th	4 × 100 m relay	39.19
2019	World Championships	Doha, Qatar	20th (sf)	200 m	20.61

== Personal bests ==
Outdoor

- 100 metres – 9.99 (+1.6 m/s) in La Chaux-de-Fonds on 3 July 2022
- 200 metres – 19.63 (+1.2 m/s) in La Chaux-de-Fonds on 3 July 2022
- 400 metres – 47.69 in Havana on 7 February 2014

=== Track records ===
As of 6 September 2024, Mena holds the following track records for 100 metres and 200 metres.

==== 100 metres ====
Location	Time	Windspeed m/s	Date
Havana	9.99; PB	0.0	08/03/2019

==== 200 metres ====
Location	Time	Windspeed m/s	Date
La Chaux-de-Fonds	19.63; NR	+ 1.2	03/07/2022
Savona	19.95	+ 1.6	24/05/2023
Szczecin	19.95	+ 0.7	24/08/2022
