= Athletics at the 2015 Pan American Games – Men's 100 metres =

Men's 100 metres at the 2015 Pan American Games
- Venue: CIBC Pan Am and Parapan Am Athletics Stadium
- Dates: July 21 – July 22
- Competitors: 25 from 16 nations
- Winning time: 10.05

Medalists
Gold medal	Andre De Grasse	Canada
Silver medal	Ramon Gittens	Barbados
Bronze medal	Antoine Adams	Saint Kitts and Nevis

The men's 100 metres sprint competition of the athletics events at the 2015 Pan American Games took place between the 21 and 22 of July at the CIBC Pan Am and Parapan Am Athletics Stadium in Toronto, Canada. The defending Pan American Games champion is Lerone Clarke of Jamaica.

== Records ==
Prior to this competition, the existing world and Pan American Games records were as follows:

World record	Usain Bolt (JAM)	9.58	Berlin, Germany	August 16, 2009
Pan American Games record	Kim Collins (SKN)	10.00	Guadalajara, Mexico	October 24, 2011

== Qualification ==
Each National Olympic Committee (NOC) was able to enter up to two entrants providing they had met the minimum standard (10.38) in the qualifying period (January 1, 2014 to June 28, 2015).

== Schedule ==
Date	Time	Round
July 21, 2015	11:10	Heats
July 22, 2015	18:50	Semifinals
July 22, 2015	20:50	Final

== Results ==
All times shown are in seconds.

KEY:	q	Fastest non-qualifiers	Q	Qualified	NR	National record	PB	Personal best	SB	Seasonal best	DSQ	Disqualified	FS	False start

=== Heats ===
The fastest 4 in each heat and the next 4 fastest overall qualified for the semifinal.

==== Heat 1 ====
Wind +1.9

Rank	Name	Nationality	Time	Notes
1	Andre De Grasse	Canada	10.06	Q
2	Jason Livermore	Jamaica	10.09	Q
3	Kemar Hyman	Cayman Islands	10.14	Q
4	Yancarlos Martinez	Dominican Republic	10.14	Q, PB, NR
5	Daniel Bailey	Antigua and Barbuda	10.16	q
6	Vitor Hugo dos Santos	Brazil	10.31	
7	Brijesh Lawrence	Saint Kitts and Nevis	10.31	
8	Johnathan Farquharson	Bahamas	10.48	
	Rolando Palacios	Honduras	DSQ	FS

==== Heat 2 ====
Wind +3.3

Rank	Name	Nationality	Time	Notes
1	BeeJay Lee	United States	9.99	Q
2	Ramon Gittens	Barbados	10.03	Q
3	Antoine Adams	Saint Kitts and Nevis	10.11	Q
4	Sheldon Mitchell	Jamaica	10.14	Q
5	Reynier Mena	Cuba	10.18	q
6	Diego Palomeque	Colombia	10.44	
7	Marcus Duncan	Trinidad and Tobago	10.52	
	Gavin Smellie	Canada	DSQ	FS

==== Heat 3 ====
Wind + 2.8

Rank	Name	Nationality	Time	Notes
1	Keston Bledman	Trinidad and Tobago	9.95	Q
2	Remontay McClain	United States	9.99	Q
3	Shavez Hart	Bahamas	10.13	Q
4	Levi Cadogan	Barbados	10.18	Q
5	Stanly del Carmen	Dominican Republic	10.19	q
6	Darrell Wesh	Haiti	10.24	q
	Adam Harris	Guyana	DNF	
	Jose Carlos Moreira	Brazil	DSQ	FS

=== Semifinals ===
The fastest 3 in each heat and the next 2 fastest overall qualified for the final.

==== Semifinal 1 ====
Wind + 1.5

Rank	Name	Nationality	Time	Notes
1	Keston Bledman	Trinidad and Tobago	10.10	Q
2	Remontay McClain	United States	10.11	Q
3	Ramon Gittens	Barbados	10.15	Q, SB
4	Kemar Hyman	Cayman Islands	10.17	
5	Darrell Wesh	Haiti	10.32	
6	Sheldon Mitchell	Jamaica	10.35	
	Daniel Bailey	Antigua and Barbuda	DSQ	FS
	Stanly del Carmen	Dominican Republic	DSQ	FS

==== Semifinal 2 ====
Wind + 2.2

Rank	Name	Nationality	Time	Notes
1	Andre De Grasse	Canada	9.97	Q
2	Antoine Adams	Saint Kitts and Nevis	10.05	q
3	Jason Livermore	Jamaica	10.10	Q
4	BeeJay Lee	United States	10.15	q
5	Levi Cadogan	Barbados	10.16	q
6	Yancarlos Martinez	Dominican Republic	10.17	
7	Shavez Hart	Bahamas	10.18	
8	Reynier Mena	Cuba	10.23	

=== Final ===
Wind: +1.1

Rank	Name	Nationality	Time	Notes
1st place, gold medalist(s)	Andre De Grasse	Canada	10.05	
2nd place, silver medalist(s)	Ramon Gittens	Barbados	10.07	SB
3rd place, bronze medalist(s)	Antoine Adams	Saint Kitts and Nevis	10.09	SB
4	Keston Bledman	Trinidad and Tobago	10.12	
5	Remontay McClain	United States	10.15	
6	BeeJay Lee	United States	10.17	
7	Jason Livermore	Jamaica	10.17	
8	Levi Cadogan	Barbados	10.18	
