= Burkheart Ellis =

Barbadian sprinter

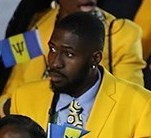
- Ellis in 2016

Personal information
- Born: 18 September 1992 (age 33) Raleigh, North Carolina, U.S.
- Education: St. Augustine's University
- Height: 1.91 m (6 ft 3 in)
- Weight: 93 kg (205 lb)

Sport
- Country: Barbados
- Sport: Athletics
- College team: St. Augustine's Falcons
- Coached by: George Williams

Burkheart Steve Ellis Jr. (born 18 September 1992) is a Barbadian sprinter. Though he was born in the United States, he competed in the men's 200 metres at the 2016 Summer Olympics for Barbados.

His mother Sophia Ifill and father Burkheart Ellis Sr. (who represented Barbados) were both athletes.

== International competitions ==
Year	Competition	Venue	Position	Event	Notes
Representing Barbados
2012	NACAC U23 Championships	Irapuato, Mexico	9th (h)	200 m	21.23
2012	NACAC U23 Championships	Irapuato, Mexico	7th	400 m	47.20
2013	Central American and Caribbean Championships	Morelia, Mexico	–	200 m	DNF
2014	NACAC U23 Championships	Kamloops, Canada	5th	400 m	47.10
2015	Pan American Games	Toronto, Ontario, Canada	17th (h)	200 m	20.70 (w)
2015	Pan American Games	Toronto, Ontario, Canada	4th	4 × 100 m relay	38.79
2015	NACAC Championships	San José, Costa Rica	10th (sf)	200 m	20.78
2015	NACAC Championships	San José, Costa Rica	3rd	4 × 100 m relay	38.55
2016	Olympic Games	Rio de Janeiro, Brazil	56th (h)	200 m	20.74
2017	IAAF World Relays	Nassau, Bahamas	2nd	4 × 100 m relay	39.18
2017	World Championships	London, United Kingdom	41st (h)	200 m	20.86
2018	Commonwealth Games	Gold Coast, Australia	13th (sf)	200 m	20.79
2018	Commonwealth Games	Gold Coast, Australia	5th	4 × 100 m relay	39.04
2018	Central American and Caribbean Games	Barranquilla, Colombia	8th (sf)	100 m	10.10^{1}
2018	Central American and Caribbean Games	Barranquilla, Colombia	11th (h)	200 m	20.92^{2}
2018	Central American and Caribbean Games	Barranquilla, Colombia	1st	4 × 100 m relay	38.41
2018	NACAC Championships	Toronto, Canada	11th (h)	100 m	10.46
2018	NACAC Championships	Toronto, Canada	2nd	4 × 100 m relay	38.69

^{1}Disqualified in the final

^{2}Disqualified in the semifinals
