= Stanly del Carmen =

Dominican Republic sprinter (born 1995)

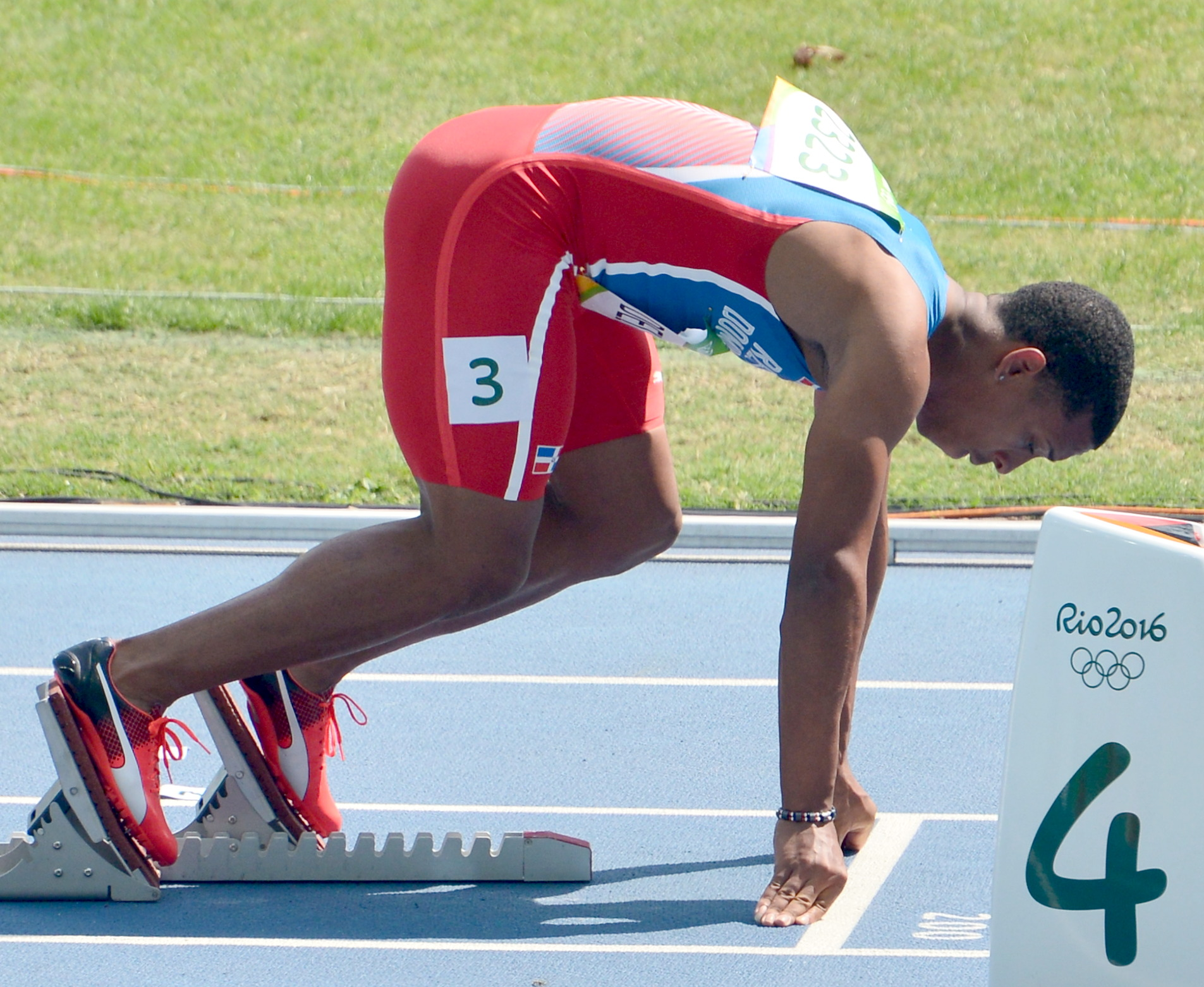
- Del Carmen at the 2016 Olympics

Personal information
- Born: 20 September 1995 (age 30)
- Education: Universidad Autónoma de Santo Domingo
- Height: 1.63 m (5 ft 4 in)
- Weight: 62 kg (137 lb)

Sport
- Sport: Athletics
- Events: 100 m, 200 m
- Club: JLR Track Club
- Coached by: Jose Ludwig Rubio

Stanly José del Carmen Cruz (born 20 September 1995) is sprinter from the Dominican Republic. He competed at the 2016 Olympics in the 200 m and 4 × 100 m relay, but failed to reach the finals.

== Personal best ==
Outdoor

- 100 metres: 10.18 s (wind: +1.6 m/s) – (Colombia) Medellín, 9 May 2015
- 200 metres: 20.46 s (wind: +1.9 m/s) – (Switzerland) La Chaux-de-Fonds, 26 June 2016

Indoor

- 200 metres: 21.03 – (United States) Boston, 13 February 2016

== Achievements ==
Year	Competition	Venue	Position	Event	Notes
Representing the Dominican Republic
2012	Central American and Caribbean; Junior Championships (U18)	San Salvador, El Salvador	10th (h)	100 m	10.83
2012	Central American and Caribbean; Junior Championships (U18)	San Salvador, El Salvador	13th (h)	200 m	22.03
2012	Central American and Caribbean; Junior Championships (U18)	San Salvador, El Salvador	2nd	4 × 100 m relay	41.57
2012	Central American and Caribbean; Junior Championships (U18)	San Salvador, El Salvador	6th	4 × 400 m relay	3:17.78
2014	Central American and Caribbean; Junior Championships (U20)	Morelia, Mexico	4th	200 m	21.29
2014	Central American and Caribbean; Junior Championships (U20)	Morelia, Mexico	4th	4 × 100 m relay	41.10
2014	World Junior Championships	Eugene, United States	23rd (sf)	100 m	10.92
2014	World Junior Championships	Eugene, United States	29th (h)	200 m	21.44
2014	Ibero-American Championships	São Paulo, Brazil	2nd	4 × 100 m relay	39.92
2014	Central American and Caribbean Games	Xalapa, Mexico	10th (sf)	200 m	21.27
2014	Central American and Caribbean Games	Xalapa, Mexico	2nd	4 × 100 m relay	39.01
2015	IAAF World Relays	Nassau, Bahamas	11th (B)	4 × 100 m relay	38.98
2015	Pan American Games	Toronto, Canada	15th (h)	100 m	10.19 (w)^{1}
2015	Pan American Games	Toronto, Canada	5th	4 × 100 m relay	38.86
2015	NACAC Championships	San José, Costa Rica	15th (sf)	100 m	10.32 (w)
2015	NACAC Championships	San José, Costa Rica	4th	4 × 100 m relay	38.78
2015	Military World Games	Mungyeong, South Korea	11th (sf)	100 m	10.73
2015	Military World Games	Mungyeong, South Korea	2nd	4 × 100 m relay	39.41
2016	Ibero-American Championships	Rio de Janeiro, Brazil	1st	100 m	10.27
2016	Ibero-American Championships	Rio de Janeiro, Brazil	11th (h)	200 m	21.24^{2}
2016	Ibero-American Championships	Rio de Janeiro, Brazil	1st	4 × 100 m relay	38.52
2016	NACAC U23 Championships	San Salvador, El Salvador	2nd	100 m	10.37
2016	NACAC U23 Championships	San Salvador, El Salvador	2nd	200 m	20.51
2016	NACAC U23 Championships	San Salvador, El Salvador	4th	4 × 100 m	39.97
2016	Olympic Games	Rio de Janeiro, Brazil	38th (h)	200 m	20.55
2016	Olympic Games	Rio de Janeiro, Brazil	–	4 × 100 m relay	DQ
2018	Central American and Caribbean Games	Barranquilla, Colombia	2nd	4 × 100 m relay	38.71
2018	NACAC Championships	Toronto, Canada	18th (h)	100 m	10.73

^{1}Disqualified in the semifinals

^{2}Did not finish in the semifinals
