= Yancarlos Martínez =

Dominican Republic sprinter

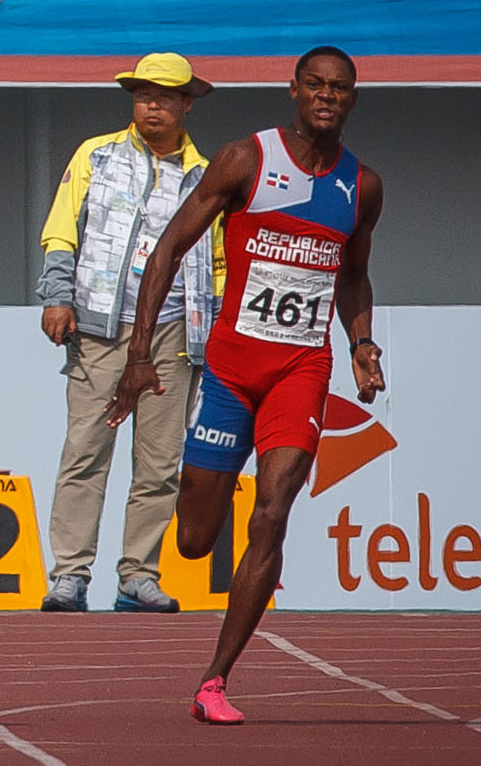
- Yancarlos Martínez at the 2015 Military World Games.

Personal information
- Born: 8 July 1992 (age 34) San Cristóbal, Dominican Republic
- Height: 1.71 m (5 ft 7 1/2 in)
- Weight: 60 kg (132 lb)

Sport
- Country: Dominican Republic
- Sport: Track and field
- Events: 100 metres 200 metres
Medal record
Men's athletics
Representing Dominican Republic
Pan American Games
Bronze medal – third place	2019 Lima	200 m

Yancarlos Martínez Martínez (born 8 July 1992) is a Dominican Republic sprinter. He competed in the 100 and 200 metres at the 2015 World Championships in Beijing reaching the semifinals in the second event. Initially he practiced baseball, and only switched to athletics after injuring his wrist in 2013.

He competed at the 2020 Summer Olympics.

== International competitions ==
Year	Competition	Venue	Position	Event	Notes
Representing Dominican Republic
2014	Central American and Caribbean Games	Xalapa, Mexico	4th	100 m	10.29
2014	Central American and Caribbean Games	Xalapa, Mexico	2nd	4 × 100 m relay	39.01
2015	IAAF World Relays	Nassau, Bahamas	3rd (B)	4 × 100 m relay	38.98
2015	Pan American Games	Toronto, Canada	9th (sf)	100 m	10.17
2015	Pan American Games	Toronto, Canada	7th	200 m	20.47
2015	Pan American Games	Toronto, Canada	5th	4 × 100 m relay	38.86
2015	NACAC Championships	San José, Costa Rica	2nd	200 m	20.28
2015	NACAC Championships	San José, Costa Rica	4th	4 × 100 m relay	38.78
2015	World Championships	Beijing, China	28th (h)	100 m	10.19
2015	World Championships	Beijing, China	14th (h)	200 m	20.31
2015	Military World Games	Mungyeong, South Korea	5th	200 m	20.88
2015	Military World Games	Mungyeong, South Korea	2nd	4 × 100 m relay	39.41
2016	World Indoor Championships	Portland, United States	40th (h)	60 m	6.83
2016	Ibero-American Championships	Rio de Janeiro, Brazil	1st	200 m	20.19
2016	Ibero-American Championships	Rio de Janeiro, Brazil	1st	4 × 100 m relay	38.52
2016	Olympic Games	Rio de Janeiro, Brazil	66th (h)	200 m	20.97
2016	Olympic Games	Rio de Janeiro, Brazil	–	4 × 100 m relay	DQ
2018	Central American and Caribbean Games	Barranquilla, Colombia	7th	200 m	20.63
2018	Central American and Caribbean Games	Barranquilla, Colombia	2nd	4 × 100 m relay	38.71
2019	World Relays	Yokohama, Japan	18th (h)	4 × 100 m relay	39.12
2019	Pan American Games	Lima, Peru	3rd	200 m	20.44
2019	World Championships	Doha, Qatar	9th (sf)	200 m	20.28
2021	Olympic Games	Tokyo, Japan	12th (sf)	200 m	20.24
2022	Ibero-American Championships	La Nucía, Spain	2nd	200 m	20.60
2022	Ibero-American Championships	La Nucía, Spain	2nd	4 × 100 m relay	39.19
2022	World Championships	Eugene, United States	10th (sf)	200 m	20.21
2023	Central American and Caribbean Games	San Salvador, El Salvador	5th	200 m	45.63
2023	Central American and Caribbean Games	San Salvador, El Salvador	2nd	4 × 100 m relay	38.61
2023	Pan American Games	Santiago, Chile	9th (h)	200 m	21.30
2023	Pan American Games	Santiago, Chile	–	4 × 100 m relay	DNF
2025	Bolivarian Games	Lima, Peru	2nd	4 × 100 m relay	39.20
2026	Central American and Caribbean Games	Santo Domingo, Dominican Republic	1st	4 × 100 m relay	37.98

== Personal bests ==
Outdoor

- 100 metres – 10.14 (+1.9 m/s, Toronto 2015)
- 200 metres – 20.17 (-0.4 m/s, Tokyo 2021)

Indoor

- 60 metres – 6.78 (New York 2016)
