= Miguel Francis =

British athlete

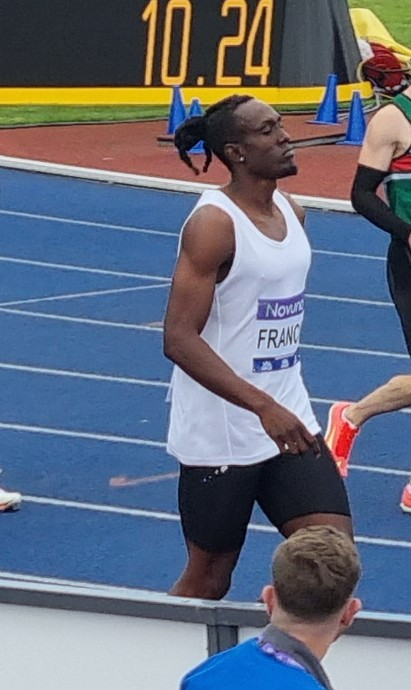
- Francis in 2025

Personal information
- Nationality: British; Antiguan
- Born: 28 March 1995 (age 30) Montserrat
- Height: 1.92 m (6 ft 4 in)
- Weight: 83 kg (183 lb)

Sport
- Sport: Athletics
- Event: 200 metres

Miguel Francis (born 28 March 1995) is a sprinter born in Montserrat, a British overseas territory, who as of 5 April 2017 represents Great Britain internationally. Francis, a resident of Antigua and Barbuda following his evacuation from Montserrat at just 6 months old, competed for that nation prior to April 2017. He competed for that country in the 200 metres at the 2015 World Championships in Beijing narrowly missing the final.

In 2016, it was reported that Francis had requested a transfer of allegiance to Great Britain; as a citizen of an overseas territory, Francis is entitled to compete for Great Britain under the same rules as Shara Proctor, Delano Williams and Zharnel Hughes. Unlike these athletes, however, Francis needed to serve a period out of competition, having represented another full national team, Antigua and Barbuda. On 5 April 2017 IAAF confirmed that Francis' transfer of allegiance was complete and that Francis was registered and eligible to compete for Great Britain 'with immediate effect'.

== International competitions ==
Year	Competition	Venue	Position	Event	Notes
Representing Antigua and Barbuda
2014	Central American and Caribbean; Junior Championships (U20)	Morelia, Mexico	3rd	200 m	21.00
2014	World Junior Championships	Eugene, United States	18th (sf)	200 m	21.29
2014	Commonwealth Games	Glasgow, United Kingdom	7th	4 × 100 m relay	40.45
2015	IAAF World Relays	Nassau, Bahamas	6th (B)	4 × 100 m relay	39.25
2015	IAAF World Relays	Nassau, Bahamas	–	4 × 200 m relay	DNF
2015	Pan American Games	Toronto, Canada	6th	200 m	20.20
2015	Pan American Games	Toronto, Canada	1st (h)	4 × 100 m relay	38.14^{1}
2015	World Championships	Beijing, China	7th (sf)	200 m	20.14
2015	World Championships	Beijing, China	6th	4 × 100 m relay	38.61
Representing Great Britain
2019	World Championships	Doha, Qatar	4th (h)	200 m	20.11^{2}

^{1}Disqualified in the final
^{2}Did not start in the semifinals

== Personal bests ==
Outdoor

- 100 metres – 10.23 (+0.9 m/s, Kingston 2019)
- 200 metres – 19.88 (+1.2 m/s, J.N. Racers, Jamaica, 2016) NR
