= BeeJay Lee =

American sprinter

Personal information
- Full name: Bernard Robert Lee Jr.
- Born: March 5, 1993 (age 33) Duarte, California, US
- Height: 5 ft 6 in (168 cm)
- Weight: 155 lb (70 kg)

Sport
- Sport: Track and field
- Event(s): 100 m, 200 m
- College team: USC Trojans; New Mexico Lobos

Achievements and titles
- Personal best(s): 100 m: 9.99 (2015); 200 m: 20.11 (2015)
Medal record
Men's athletics
Representing the United States
World Championships
Silver medal – second place	2017 London	4×100 m relay
Pan American Games
Gold medal – first place	2015 Toronto	4×100 m relay
NACAC Championships
Silver medal – second place	2015 Costa Rica	4×100 m relay

Bernard "BeeJay" Robert Lee Jr. (born March 5, 1993) is an American track and field sprinter who specializes in the 100 m and 200 m. He was a member of the USA team in the 4 × 100 m relay at the 2017 World Championships in Athletics in London, UK. He ran in the winning semi-final, and received a silver medal after the team placed second in the final.

== Biography ==
=== Early life ===
Beejay Lee grew up as one of five children of Bernard Lee and Karen Lee in the Californian city of West Covina. There he attended West Covina High School and participated in the athletics competitions.

=== College ===
After studying communication and journalism at the University of New Mexico, he joined the University of Southern California in 2013, running for the USC Trojans until his final season representing the school in 2015.

=== Professional track career ===
At the 2015 Pan American Games in Toronto, he finished sixth in 100 m, eighth in the 200 m, and won gold with the USA team in the 4 × 100 m relay.

== Statistics ==
Information from IAAF profile or Track & Field Results Reporting System unless otherwise noted.

=== Personal bests ===
Event	Time	Wind (m/s)	Venue	Date	Notes
60 m	6.61	n/a	Seattle, Washington, USA	February 28, 2015	
100 m	9.99	+1.7	Eugene, Oregon, USA	June 25, 2015	
100 m	9.94 w	+3.7	Eugene, Oregon, USA	June 26, 2015	Wind-assisted
200 m	20.11	+0.4	Eugene, Oregon, USA	June 28, 2015	
4×100 m relay	37.70	n/a	London, England	August 12, 2017	
4×200 m relay	1:22.17	n/a	Gainesville, Florida, USA	April 5, 2014	

=== Seasonal bests ===
==== 100 m ====
Year	Time	Wind (m/s)	Venue	Date
2010	10.61	+0.9	Walnut, California, USA	April 17
2011	10.49 w	+2.1	Arcadia, California, USA	April 9
2011	10.65	+0.2	Arcadia, California, USA	April 9
2012	10.26 w	+4.3	Austin, Texas, USA	May 25
2012	10.28	+1.3	Des Moines, Iowa, USA	June 6
2013	10.07	+1.6	Los Angeles, California, USA	May 12
2014	10.25	-0.7	Los Angeles, California, USA	May 4
2014	10.16 w	+2.7	Fayetteville, Arkansas, USA	May 30
2015	9.99	+1.7	Eugene, Oregon, USA	June 25
2015	9.94 w	+3.7	Eugene, Oregon, USA	June 26
2016	10.08 w	+2.4	Norwalk, California, USA	April 16
2016	10.09	+0.7	Phoenix, Arizona, USA	May 21
2017	10.05	+1.2	Sacramento, California, USA	June 22

==== 200 m ====
Year	Time	Wind (m/s)	Venue	Date
2010	21.90	+1.7	Norwalk, California, USA	May 22
2011	20.96	+0.8	Norwalk, California, USA	May 27
2012	21.04	+0.8	Air Force Academy, Colorado, USA	May 12
2013	21.23	+2.0	Gainesville, Florida, USA	April 5
2014	20.83	+1.3	Los Angeles, California, USA	May 4
2015	20.11	+0.4	Eugene, Oregon, USA	June 28
2016	20.23	+1.0	Norwalk, California, USA	April 16
2017	20.17	+0.6	Somerville, Massachusetts, USA	June 4

=== International championship results ===
Year	Competition	Position	Event	Notes
Representing the United States
2015	Pan American Games	6th	100 m	
2015	Pan American Games	8th	200 m	
2015	Pan American Games	1st	4×100 m relay	38.27 s, PB
2015	NACAC Championships	8th	100 m	
2015	NACAC Championships	2nd	4×100 m relay	
2017	World Championships	1st (semi 1)	4×100 m relay	37.70 s, Q (Note: BeeJay Lee did not run in the final, but the four that ran in the final finished second, earning the team silver medals.), PB
2017	DécaNation	4th	100 m	
2017	DécaNation	7th	200 m	

=== National championship results ===
Year	Competition	Position	Event	Notes
Representing the New Mexico Lobos
2012	NCAA Division I Championships	20th	100 m	10.28 s, +1.3 m/s wind, PB
2012	USA Junior Championships	11th	100 m	
Representing the USC Trojans
2014	NCAA Division I Indoor Championships	11th	60 m	
2014	NCAA Division I Championships	22nd	100 m	
2014	NCAA Division I Championships	4th	4×100 m relay	
2015	NCAA Division I Indoor Championships	13th	60 m	
2015	NCAA Division I Championships	10th	100 m	
2015	NCAA Division I Championships	9th	200 m	
2015	NCAA Division I Championships	4th	4×100 m relay	38.75 s, PB
2015	USA Championships	6th	100 m	
2015	USA Championships	4th	200 m	20.11 s, PB
Unattached
2016	USA Olympic Trials	7th (semi 1)	100 m	
2016	USA Olympic Trials	4th (quarter 3)	200 m	
2017	USA Championships	5th	100 m	
