= Ramon Gittens =

Barbadian sprinter (born 1987)

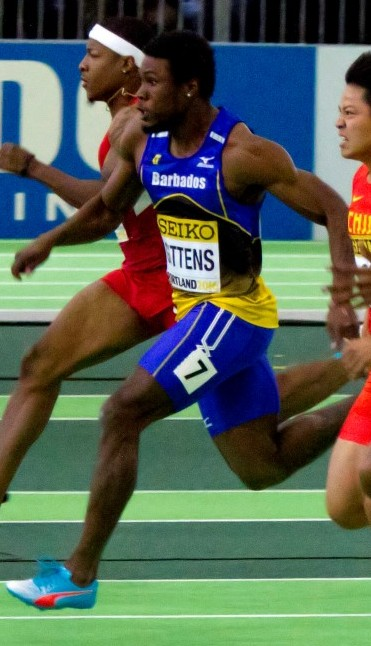
- Gittens at the 2016 IAAF World Indoor Championships

Personal information
- Nationality: Barbados
- Born: July 20, 1987 (age 38) Bridgetown, Barbados
- Height: 5 ft 11 in (1.80 m)
- Weight: 174 lb (79 kg)

Sport
- Sport: Track and field
- Event: 100 metres
- College team: Saint Augustine's College
Medal record
World Indoor Championships
Bronze medal – third place	2016 Portland	60 m
Pan American Games
Silver medal – second place	2015 Toronto	100 m
CAC Championshipa
Bronze medal – third place	2013 Morelia	100 m

Ramon Gittens (born July 20, 1987) is a Barbadian sprinter. He represented his country at the 2012 Summer Olympics as well as four outdoor World Championships in Athletics. He was the 100 meters silver medalist at the 2015 Pan American Games.

He competed for Barbados at the 2016 Summer Olympics in the 100 m and 200 m events. He finished 4th in his heat for the 100 m competition and did not qualify for the semifinals. In the 200 m, he finished 3rd in his heat and did not qualify for the semifinals. Gittens was the flag bearer for Barbados during the Parade of Nations.

== Competition record ==
Year	Competition	Venue	Position	Event	Notes
Representing Barbados
2002	Central American and Caribbean; Junior Championships (U17)	Bridgetown, Barbados	14th (h)	100 m	11.63
2002	Central American and Caribbean; Junior Championships (U17)	Bridgetown, Barbados	11th (h)	200 m	22.79
2002	Central American and Caribbean; Junior Championships (U17)	Bridgetown, Barbados	2nd	4 × 100 m	42.79
2003	CARIFTA Games (U17)	Port of Spain, Trinidad and Tobago	3rd	100 m	10.92
2003	CARIFTA Games (U17)	Port of Spain, Trinidad and Tobago	4th	200 m	22.49
2003	CARIFTA Games (U17)	Port of Spain, Trinidad and Tobago	2nd	4 × 100 m	42.13
2003	World Youth Championships	Sherbrooke, Canada	19th (h)	100 m	10.85^{1}
2003	World Youth Championships	Sherbrooke, Canada	16th (h)	200 m	22.03^{1}
2003	Pan American Junior Championships	Bridgetown, Barbados	9th (h)	100 m	11.03
2004	CARIFTA Games (U20)	Hamilton, Bermuda	5th	100 m	10.78
2004	CARIFTA Games (U20)	Hamilton, Bermuda	6th	200 m	21.48
2004	CARIFTA Games (U20)	Hamilton, Bermuda	3rd	4 × 100 m	41.80
2005	CARIFTA Games (U20)	Bacolet, Trinidad and Tobago	6th	100 m	10.75
2005	CARIFTA Games (U20)	Bacolet, Trinidad and Tobago	4th	200 m	21.65
2005	Central American and Caribbean Championships	Nassau, Bahamas	25th (h)	100 m	10.98
2005	Pan American Junior Championships	Windsor, Canada	8th	100 m	10.73
2005	Pan American Junior Championships	Windsor, Canada	4th	200 m	21.59 (w)
2006	CARIFTA Games (U20)	Les Abymes, Guadeloupe	3rd	100 m	10.60
2006	Central American and Caribbean; Junior Championships (U20)	Port of Spain, Trinidad and Tobago	3rd	100 m	10.56
2006	Central American and Caribbean; Junior Championships (U20)	Port of Spain, Trinidad and Tobago	2nd	200 m	21.12
2006	Central American and Caribbean; Junior Championships (U20)	Port of Spain, Trinidad and Tobago	2nd	4 × 100 m	40.68
2006	Central American and Caribbean; Junior Championships	Port of Spain, Trinidad and Tobago	3rd	100 m	10.56
2006	Central American and Caribbean; Junior Championships	Port of Spain, Trinidad and Tobago	2nd	200 m	21.12
2006	World Junior Championships	Beijing, China	5th	200 m	21.25
2007	NACAC Championships	San Salvador, El Salvador	13th (h)	200 m	21.69
2007	Pan American Games	Rio de Janeiro, Brazil	14th (sf)	200 m	21.21
2008	Central American and Caribbean Championships	Cali, Colombia	9th (h)	200 m	20.94^{1}
2008	NACAC U23 Championships	Toluca, Mexico	5th	100 m	10.33
2008	NACAC U23 Championships	Toluca, Mexico	7th (h)	200 m	21.18
2009	Central American and Caribbean Championships	Havana, Cuba	9th (h)	100 m	10.41
2009	Central American and Caribbean Championships	Havana, Cuba	8th (h)	200 m	21.07
2009	World Championships	Berlin, Germany	46th (h)	100 m	10.47
2009	World Championships	Berlin, Germany	44th (h)	200 m	21.33
2011	Central American and Caribbean Championships	Mayagüez, Puerto Rico	5th	100 m	10.31
2011	World Championships	Daegu, South Korea	24th (h)	100 m	10.42
2011	Pan American Games	Guadalajara, Mexico	7th (sf)	100 m	10.37
2012	Olympic Games	London, United Kingdom	39th (h)	100 m	10.35
2013	Central American and Caribbean Championships	Morelia, Mexico	3rd	100 m	10.19
2013	World Championships	Moscow, Russia	21st (sf)	100 m	10.31
2013	World Championships	Moscow, Russia	15th (h)	4 × 100 m	38.94
2014	IAAF World Relays	Nassau, Bahamas	16th (h)	4 × 100 m	39.27
2014	IAAF World Relays	Nassau, Bahamas	4th	4 × 200 m	1:21.88
2014	Commonwealth Games	Glasgow, United Kingdom	8th	100 m	10.25
2015	IAAF World Relays	Nassau, Bahamas	2nd (B)	4 × 100 m	38.70
2015	IAAF World Relays	Nassau, Bahamas	7th (h)	4 × 200 m	1:22.86
2015	Pan American Games	Toronto, Canada	2nd	100 m	10.07
2015	Pan American Games	Toronto, Canada	4th	4 × 100 m	38.79
2015	NACAC Championships	San José, Costa Rica	2nd	100 m	10.11
2015	NACAC Championships	San José, Costa Rica	3rd	4 × 100 m	38.55
2015	World Championships	Beijing, China	12th (sf)	100 m	10.04
2016	World Indoor Championships	Portland, United States	3rd	60 m	6.51
2016	Olympic Games	Rio de Janeiro, Brazil	32nd (h)	100 m	10.25
2016	Olympic Games	Rio de Janeiro, Brazil	40th (h)	200 m	20.58
2017	IAAF World Relays	Nassau, Bahamas	2nd	4 × 100 m	39.18
2017	World Championships	London, United Kingdom	24th (h)	100 m	10.24
2017	World Championships	London, United Kingdom	14th (h)	4 × 100 m	39.19
2018	Commonwealth Games	Gold Coast, Australia	20th (sf)	100 m	10.44
2018	Commonwealth Games	Gold Coast, Australia	5th	4 × 100 m	39.04

^{1}Did not start in the semifinals

== Personal bests ==
Outdoor

- 100 metres – 10.02 (+1.9 m/s, Montverde 2013)
- 200 metres – 20.42 (Bridgetown 2016)

Indoor

- 60 metres – 6.51 (Portland 2016)
- 200 metres – 21.20 (Albuquerque 2011)

Olympic Games
Preceded by Ryan Brathwaite	Flagbearer for Barbados; Rio de Janeiro 2016	Succeeded by Danielle Titus; Alex Sobers
