= Keston Bledman =

Trinidad and Tobago sprinter (born 1988)

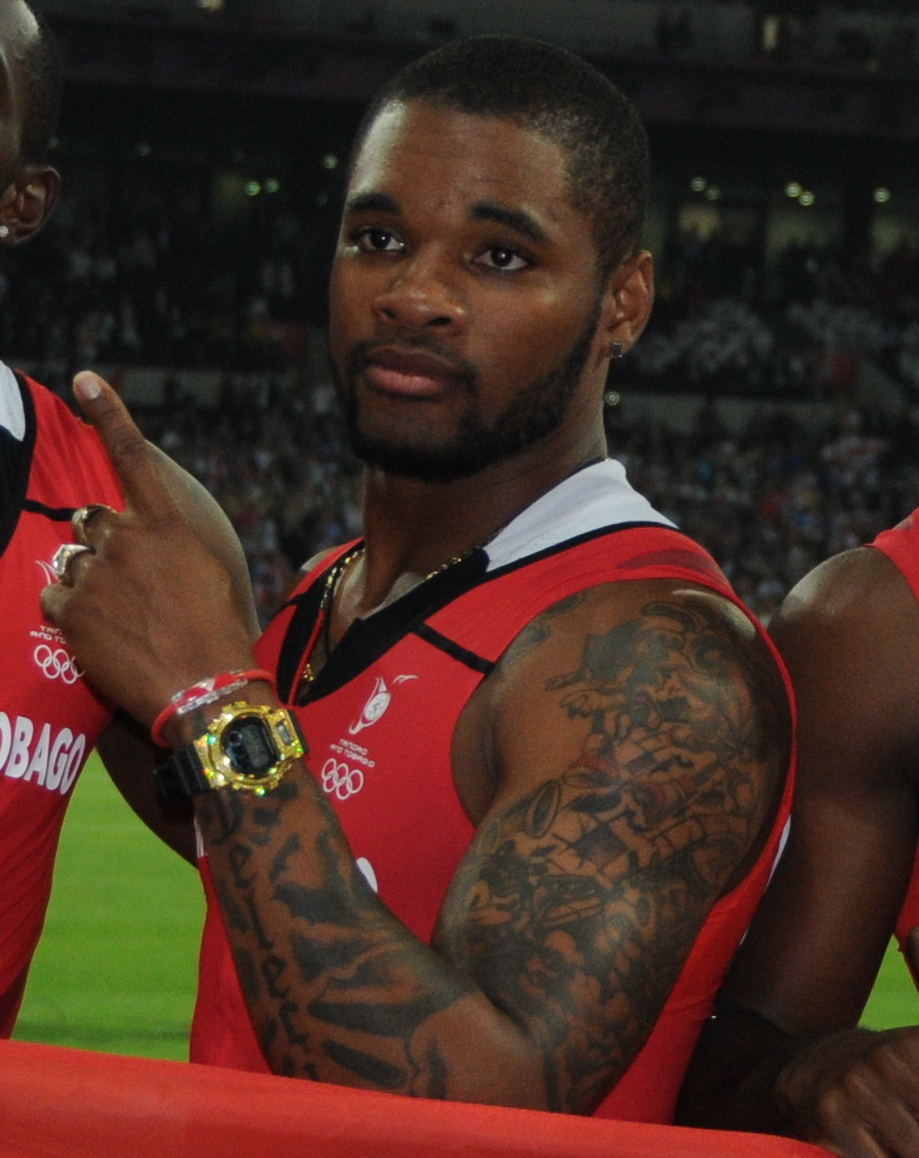
- Keston Bledman at the 2012 Olympics in London

Personal information
- Born: 8 March 1988 (age 38) San Fernando, Trinidad and Tobago
- Height: 1.80 m (5 ft 11 in)
- Weight: 88 kg (194 lb)

Sport
- Sport: Track and field
- Event: Sprinting

Achievements and titles
- Personal bests: 100 m: 9.86 (Trinidad 2012); 200 m: 20.73 (Lappeenranta 2008)
Medal record
Men's Athletics
Representing Trinidad and Tobago
Olympic Games
Gold medal – first place	2008 Beijing	4 × 100 m relay
Silver medal – second place	2012 London	4 × 100 m relay
Commonwealth Games
Bronze medal – third place	2014 Glasgow	4 × 100 m relay
Pan American Games
Silver medal – second place	2019 Lima	4 × 100 m relay
Bronze medal – third place	2015 Toronto	4 × 100 m relay
CAC Championships
Gold medal – first place	2008 Cali	4 × 100 m relay
Gold medal – first place	2009 Havana	4 × 100 m relay
Gold medal – first place	2011 Mayagüez	100 m
Silver medal – second place	2011 Mayagüez	4 × 100 m relay
Pan American Junior Championships
Gold medal – first place	2007 São Paulo	100 m
Silver medal – second place	2007 São Paulo	4 × 100 m relay
World Youth Championships
Silver medal – second place	2005 Marrakesh	Medley relay
Bronze medal – third place	2005 Marrakesh	100 m

Keston Bledman, HBM (born 8 March 1988) is a Trinidad and Tobago sprinter.

== Early career ==
His mother lived in the US, and Bledman attributes his athletic success to wanting to do well enough to qualify for the national team and earn a visa. He was recruited by Gunness Persad, who became his coach, at Pleasantville Senior Comprehensive sportsday. His first international competition was the 2005 World Youth Championships, where he won an individual bronze. His athletics idol is Hasely Crawford who won the 100 m at the 1976 Olympics for Trinidad and Tobago.

== Career ==
On 7 July 2007, at the 2007 Pan American Junior Athletics Championships in São Paulo, Brazil, he upset the Jamaican Yohan Blake in the 100 meters, finishing in 10.32 seconds (−1.1 m/s wind).

Bledman represented Trinidad and Tobago at the 2008 Summer Olympics in Beijing. He competed at the 4 × 100 m relay together with Marc Burns, Aaron Armstrong and Richard Thompson. He was the lead off man. In their qualification heat they placed first in front of Japan, the Netherlands and Brazil. Their time of 38.26 was the fastest of all sixteen teams participating in the first round and they qualified for the final. Armstrong was replaced by Emmanuel Callender for the final race and they sprinted to a time of 38.06 seconds, the second time after the Jamaican team, winning the silver medal. In 2022, Bledman and his teammates received the gold medal due to Jamaica's Nesta Carter testing positive for the prohibited substance methylhexaneamine.

He ran in the first round, but not the final of the men's 4 × 100 m at the 2009 World Championships where Trinidad and Tobago won silver.

On 4 June 2011, Bledman ran 9.93 over 100 m in Clermont, Florida, to become the 78th athlete to cross the 10-second barrier. He won his first national title in June 2012 by beating Richard Thompson over 100 m and ran a personal best time of 9.86 seconds, which is currently tied for the 27th fastest ever. At the 2011 World Championships, he qualified for the 100 m final as one of the fastest losers in the semi-final.

He was also a member of the relay team that won a silver medal at the 2012 Summer Olympics in London. He was part of the Trinidad and Tobago team 4 × 100 m team that won the bronze at the 2014 Commonwealth Games. He ran in the 100 m and the 4 × 100 m at the 2016 Summer Olympics.

== Personal bests ==
Distance	Time	venue
100 m	9.86 s (+1.4 m/s)	Port-of-Spain, Trinidad and Tobago (23 June 2012)
200 m	20.73 s	Lappeenranta, Finland (3 August 2008)

== International competitions ==
Year	Competition	Venue	Position	Event	Notes
Representing Trinidad and Tobago
2005	CARIFTA Games (U-20)	Bacolet, Trinidad and Tobago	8th	100 m	10.79 (+1.7 m/s)
2005	CARIFTA Games (U-20)	Bacolet, Trinidad and Tobago	1st	4 × 100 m relay	41.05
2005	World Youth Championships	Marrakesh, Morocco	3rd	100 m	10.55
2005	World Youth Championships	Marrakesh, Morocco	2nd	Sprint medley relay	1:52.51
2006	CARIFTA Games (U-20)	Les Abymes, Guadeloupe	2nd	100 m	10.57 (0.0 m/s)
2006	Central American and Caribbean; Junior Championships (U-20)	Port of Spain, Trinidad and Tobago	2nd	100 m	10.39 (+1.5 m/s)
2006	Central American and Caribbean; Junior Championships (U-20)	Port of Spain, Trinidad and Tobago	4th	4 × 100 m relay	40.80
2006	World Junior Championships	Beijing, China	7th	100 m	10.47 (-0.5 m/s)
2006	World Junior Championships	Beijing, China	54th (h)	200 m	25.57 (-0.6 m/s)
2007	CARIFTA Games (U-20)	Providenciales, Turks and Caicos Islands	2nd	100 m	10.41 (+1.2 m/s)
2007	Pan American Junior Championships	São Paulo, Brazil	1st	100 m	10.32
2007	Pan American Junior Championships	São Paulo, Brazil	2nd	4 × 100 m relay	40.11
2007	Pan American Games	Rio de Janeiro, Brazil	9th (sf)	100 m	10.34
2007	Pan American Games	Rio de Janeiro, Brazil	4th	4 × 100 m relay	39.23
2007	World Championships	Osaka, Japan	22nd (qf)	100 m	10.33
2008	Central American and Caribbean Championships	Cali, Colombia	10th (sf)	100 m	10.38
2008	Central American and Caribbean Championships	Cali, Colombia	1st	4 × 100 m relay	38.54
2008	Olympic Games	Beijing, China	1st	4 × 100 m relay	38.06
2009	Central American and Caribbean Championships	Havana, Cuba	6th	100 m	10.29
2009	Central American and Caribbean Championships	Havana, Cuba	1st	4 × 100 m relay	38.73
2009	World Championships	Berlin, Germany	2nd (h)	4 × 100 m relay	38.47
2010	NACAC U23 Championships	Miramar, United States	4th	100 m	10.19 (+1.7 m/s)
2010	Central American and Caribbean Games	Mayagüez, Puerto Rico	7th	100 m	10.32
2010	Central American and Caribbean Games	Mayagüez, Puerto Rico	1st	4 × 100 m relay	38.24
2011	Central American and Caribbean Championships	Mayagüez, Puerto Rico	1st	100 m	10.05
2011	Central American and Caribbean Championships	Mayagüez, Puerto Rico	2nd	4 × 100 m relay	38.89
2011	World Championships	Daegu, South Korea	8th (sf)	100 m	10.14
2011	World Championships	Daegu, South Korea	6th	4 × 100 m relay	39.01
2012	Olympic Games	London, United Kingdom	9th (sf)	100 m	10.04
2012	Olympic Games	London, United Kingdom	2nd	4 × 100 m relay	38.12
2013	World Championships	Moscow, Russia	11th (sf)	100 m	10.08
2013	World Championships	Moscow, Russia	7th	4 × 100 m relay	38.57
2014	World Relays	Nassau, Bahamas	2nd	4 × 100 m relay	38.04
2014	Commonwealth Games	Glasgow, United Kingdom	14th (sf)	100 m	10.24
2014	Commonwealth Games	Glasgow, United Kingdom	3rd	4 × 100 m relay	38.10
2015	World Relays	Nassau, Bahamas	7th	4 × 100 m relay	38.92
2015	Pan American Games	Toronto, Canada	4th	100 m	10.12
2015	Pan American Games	Toronto, Canada	3rd	4 × 100 m relay	38.69
2015	World Championships	London, United Kingdom	50th (h)	100 m	10.75
2016	Olympic Games	Rio de Janeiro, Brazil	23rd (h)	100 m	10.20
2016	Olympic Games	Rio de Janeiro, Brazil	6th (h)	4 × 100 m relay	37.96^{1}
2017	World Relays	Nassau, Bahamas	11th (h)	4 × 100 m relay	39.44
2017	World Championships	London, United Kingdom	29th (h)	100 m	10.26
2017	World Championships	London, United Kingdom	9th (h)	4 × 100 m relay	38.61
2018	World Indoor Championships	Birmingham, United Kingdom	26th (h)	60 m	6.79
2018	Commonwealth Games	Gold Coast, Australia	12th (sf)	100 m	10.30
2018	Commonwealth Games	Gold Coast, Australia	–	4 × 100 m relay	DQ
2018	Central American and Caribbean Games	Barranquilla, Colombia	12th (sf)	100 m	10.35
2018	Central American and Caribbean Games	Barranquilla, Colombia	4th	4 × 100 m relay	38.90
2019	Pan American Games	Lima, Peru	8th	100 m	10.43
2019	Pan American Games	Lima, Peru	2nd	4 × 100 m relay	38.46

^{1} Disqualified in the final.

=== Track records ===
As of 9 September 2024, Bledman holds the following track records for 100 metres.

Location	Time	Windspeed m/s	Date
Arima	10.08	0.0	10 May 2014
Mayagüez	10.05	–0.5	15 July 2011
Orlando	9.89	+0.9	26 May 2012
Sotteville-lès-Rouen	10.02	+0.6	6 July 2015
Toronto	9.95	+2.8	21 July 2015
