= Dan-Neil Telesford =

Trinidad and Tobago sprinter

Personal information
- Born: 9 September 1990 (age 35)
- Education: Wiley College
- Height: 1.83 m (6 ft 0 in)
- Weight: 77 kg (170 lb)

Sport
- Sport: Athletics
- Event(s): 100 metres, 200 metres
- College team: Wiley Wildcats
- Coached by: Tusculum university
Medal record
Representing Trinidad and Tobago
Pan American Games
| Bronze medal – third place | 2015 Toronto | 4x100m relay |

Dan-Neil Javan Telesford (born 9 September 1990) is a sprinter from Trinidad and Tobago. He won a bronze medal in the 4 × 100 metres relay at the 2015 Pan American Games.

== International competitions ==
| Year | Competition | Venue | Position | Event | Notes |
Representing Trinidad and Tobago
| 2015 | Pan American Games | Toronto, Canada | 3rd | 4 × 100 m relay | 38.69 |
| 2015 | NACAC Championships | San José, Costa Rica | 16th (h) | 200 m | 20.96^{1} |
| 2015 | NACAC Championships | San José, Costa Rica | 5th | 4 × 100 m relay | 38.90 |
| 2017 | World Relays | Nassau, Bahamas | 1st (B) | 4 × 100 m relay | 39.04 |
| 2017 | World Relays | Nassau, Bahamas | 4th | 4 × 200 m relay | 1:21.39 |
| 2017 | Universiade | Taipei, Taiwan | 5th | 200 m | 21.03 |
| 2017 | Universiade | Taipei, Taiwan | 11th (h) | 4 × 100 m relay | 40.13 |

^{1}Disqualified in the semifinals

== Personal bests ==
Outdoor

- 100 metres – 10.28 (+1.8 m/s, Port-of-Spain 2017)
- 200 metres – 20.50 (-1.0 m/s, Port-of-Spain 2017)
- 400 metres – 47.23 (Marabella 2011)

Indoor

- 200 metres – 21.96 (Fayetteville 2013)
- 400 metres – 49.31 (Cedar Falls 2013)
