= Athletics at the 2015 Pan American Games – Men's 200 metres =

Men's 200 metres at the 2015 Pan American Games
- Venue: CIBC Pan Am and Parapan Am Athletics Stadium
- Dates: July 23 – July 24
- Competitors: 29 from 21 nations
- Winning time: 19.88

Medalists
Gold medal	Andre De Grasse	Canada
Silver medal	Rasheed Dwyer	Jamaica
Bronze medal	Alonso Edward	Panama

The men's 200 metres sprint competition of the athletics events at the 2015 Pan American Games took place between the 23 and 24 of July at the CIBC Pan Am and Parapan Am Athletics Stadium in Toronto, Canada. The defending Pan American Games champion is Roberto Skyers from Cuba.

== Records ==
Prior to this competition, the existing world and Pan American Games records were as follows:

World record	Usain Bolt (JAM)	19.19	Berlin, Germany	August 20, 2009
Pan American Games record	Don Quarrie (JAM)	19.86	Cali, Colombia	August 3, 1971

== Qualification ==
Each National Olympic Committee (NOC) was able to enter up to two entrants providing they had met the minimum standard (21.00) in the qualifying period (January 1, 2014 to June 28, 2015).

== Schedule ==
Date	Time	Round
July 23, 2015	11:30	Heats
July 23, 2015	18:20	Semifinals
July 24, 2015	17:55	Final

== Results ==
All times shown are in seconds.

KEY:	q	Fastest non-qualifiers	Q	Qualified	NR	National record	PB	Personal best	SB	Seasonal best	DQ	Disqualified

=== Heats ===
Rank	Heat	Name	Nationality	Time	Wind	Notes
1	4	Andre De Grasse	Canada	20.17	+2.2	Q
2	4	Roberto Skyers	Cuba	20.18	+2.2	Q
3	1	Miguel Francis	Antigua and Barbuda	20.21	+2.4	Q
4	3	Rasheed Dwyer	Jamaica	20.25	+1.9	Q
5	3	Yancarlos Martínez	Dominican Republic	20.30	+1.9	Q, NR
6	4	BeeJay Lee	United States	20.34	+2.2	Q
7	2	Alonso Edward	Panama	20.39	+1.6	Q
8	2	Bruno de Barros	Brazil	20.41	+1.6	Q, SB
9	3	Brendon Rodney	Canada	20.43	+1.9	Q
10	3	Reynier Mena	Cuba	20.45	+1.9	q, SB
11	1	Wallace Spearmon	United States	20.49	+2.4	Q
12	1	Aldemir da Silva Junior	Brazil	20.54	+2.4	Q
13	4	Álex Quiñónez	Ecuador	20.59	+2.2	q
14	1	Antoine Adams	Saint Kitts and Nevis	20.62	+2.4	q
15	3	Rondel Sorrillo	Trinidad and Tobago	20.63	+1.9	q
16	1	Cesar Ramirez	Mexico	20.64	+2.4	
17	4	Burkheart Ellis	Barbados	20.70	+2.2	
18	1	Arturo Ramírez	Venezuela	20.74	+2.4	
19	2	Kyle Greaux	Trinidad and Tobago	20.75	+1.6	Q
20	4	Bernardo Baloyes	Colombia	20.89	+2.2	
21	2	Harold Houston	Bermuda	21.00	+1.6	
22	2	Jason Livermore	Jamaica	21.02	+1.6	
22	4	Lestrod Roland	Saint Kitts and Nevis	21.02	+2.2	
24	1	Elroy McBride	Bahamas	21.05	+2.4	
25	1	Rolando Palacios	Honduras	21.19	+2.4	
26	3	Gary Robinson	Costa Rica	21.28	+1.9	
27	2	Courtney Carl Williams	Saint Vincent and the Grenadines	21.35	+1.6	
28	3	Mark Anderson	Belize	22.44	+1.9	
	4	Yoandry Andujar	Dominican Republic	DSQ		

=== Semifinals ===
Rank	Heat	Name	Nationality	Time	Wind	Notes
1	1	Rasheed Dwyer	Jamaica	19.80	+2.0	Q, PR, PB
2	1	Wallace Spearmon	United States	20.03	+2.0	Q, SB
3	1	Miguel Francis	Antigua and Barbuda	20.05	+2.0	Q, NR
4	2	Alonso Edward	Panama	20.09	+1.0	Q
4	2	Roberto Skyers	Cuba	20.09	+1.0	Q, PB
6	2	Andre De Grasse	Canada	20.12	+1.0	Q
7	2	Yancarlos Martínez	Dominican Republic	20.22	+1.0	q, NR
8	2	BeeJay Lee	United States	20.23	+1.0	q
9	1	Brendon Rodney	Canada	20.29	+2.0	
10	1	Reynier Mena	Cuba	20.32	+2.0	PB
11	2	Rondel Sorrillo	Trinidad and Tobago	20.61	+1.0	
12	2	Aldemir da Silva Junior	Brazil	20.65	+1.0	
13	1	Bruno de Barros	Brazil	20.66	+2.0	
14	1	Kyle Greaux	Trinidad and Tobago	20.69	+2.0	
15	2	Álex Quiñónez	Ecuador	20.81	+1.0	
16	1	Antoine Adams	Saint Kitts and Nevis	20.82	+2.0	

=== Final ===
Wind: +0.3

Rank	Lane	Name	Nationality	Time	Notes
1st place, gold medalist(s)	8	Andre De Grasse	Canada	19.88	PB
2nd place, silver medalist(s)	4	Rasheed Dwyer	Jamaica	19.90	
3rd place, bronze medalist(s)	5	Alonso Edward	Panama	19.90	SB
4	6	Roberto Skyers	Cuba	20.02	NR
5	3	Wallace Spearmon	United States	20.11	
6	7	Miguel Francis	Antigua and Barbuda	20.20	
7	2	Yancarlos Martinez	Dominican Republic	20.47	
8	1	BeeJay Lee	United States	20.74	
