= Sean McLean =

American sprinter (born 1992)

Personal information
- Nationality: American
- Born: March 23, 1992 (age 34) Raleigh, North Carolina
- Height: 6 ft 2 in (1.88 m)
- Weight: 195 lb (88 kg)

Sport
- Sport: Running
- Events: 100 metres, 200 metres

Achievements and titles
- Personal bests: 100 m: 10.01 s (USA Championship Eugene, OR. 2015); 200 m: 20.24 s (British Grand Prix, 2016)
Medal record
Men's athletics
Representing the United States
Pan American Games
Gold medal – first place	2015 Toronto	4x100 m relay
Pan American Junior Championships
Gold medal – first place	2011 Miramar	4×100 m relay
Silver medal – second place	2011 Miramar	200 m

Sean McLean (born March 23, 1992) is an American sprinter who specializes in the 100 and 200 metres. He graduated from the Word of God Christian Academy in Raleigh, North Carolina, after previously attending Southeast Raleigh Magnet High School.

McLean won a silver medal in the 200 metres, and a gold medal in the 4×100 metres relay at the 2011 Pan American Junior Athletics Championships in Miramar, Florida. He was an All-USA high school track and field team selection by USA Today in 2010, and 2011. Mclean turned professional out of high school, turning down offers from some of the top track and field programs in the country.
