= Athletics at the 2015 Pan American Games =

- Athletics pictogram for the games
- Venues: CIBC Pan Am and Parapan Am Athletics Stadium; Ontario Place West Channel
- Dates: July 19–26
- No. of events: 47 (24 men, 23 women)
- Competitors: 709 from 41 nations

Athletics competitions at the 2015 Pan American Games in Toronto were held from July 19 to 26 at the newly built CIBC Pan Am and Parapan Am Athletics Stadium, located on the campus of York University. The racewalking and marathon events were held on the temporary circuits around the Ontario Place West Channel. The sport of athletics is split into distinct sets of events: track and field events, road running events, and racewalking events.

Mirroring the Olympic athletics program, both men and women had very similar schedules of events. Men competed in 24 events and women in 23, as their schedule lacks the 50 km race walk. In addition, both the men's 110 m hurdles and decathlon are reflected in the women's schedule by the 100 m hurdles and heptathlon, respectively.

== Competition schedule ==
The following is the competition schedule for the athletics competitions:

H	Heats	Q	Qualification	½	Semifinals	F	Final

Men
Event↓/Date →	Sun 19	Tue 21	Wed 22		Thu 23		Fri 24		Sat 25	Sun 26
100 m		H	½	F						
200 m					H	½	F			
400 m			½		F					
800 m			½		F					
1500 m					½		F			
5000 m									F	
10,000 m		F								
110 m hurdles							½	F		
400 m hurdles			½		F					
3000 m steeplechase		F								
4 × 100 m relay							½		F	
4 × 400 m relay							½		F	
Marathon									F	
20 km walk	F									
50 km walk										F
Long jump		Q	F							
Triple jump							F			
High jump									F	
Pole vault		F								
Shot put		F								
Discus throw					F					
Javelin throw							F			
Hammer throw			F							
Decathlon			F							

Women
Event↓/Date →	Sat 18	Sun 19	Tue 21		Wed 22		Thu 23		Fri 24	Sat 25
100 m			H		½	F				
200 m							H	½	F	
400 m					½		F			
800 m			½		F					
1500 m									½	F
5000 m			F							
10,000 m							F			
100 m hurdles			½	F						
400 m hurdles			½		F					
3000 m steeplechase									F	
4 × 100 m relay									½	F
4 × 400 m relay									½	F
Marathon	F									
20 km walk		F								
Long jump							Q		F	
Triple jump			F							
High jump					F					
Pole vault							F			
Shot put					F					
Discus throw									F	
Javelin throw			F							
Hammer throw			F							
Heptathlon							F			

== Medal table ==
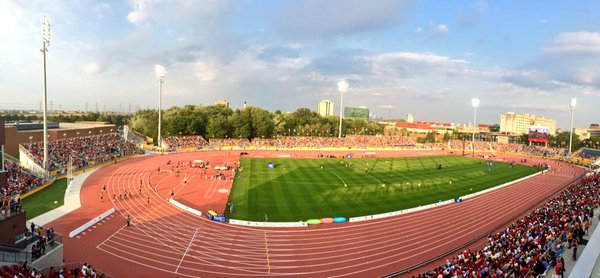
The CIBC Pan Am and Parapan Am Athletics Stadium hosted the track and field competitions

* Host nation (Canada)

Rank	Nation	Gold	Silver	Bronze	Total
1	United States	13	15	13	41
2	Canada*	11	7	9	27
3	Cuba	5	3	1	9
4	Jamaica	3	3	2	8
5	Trinidad and Tobago	3	2	1	6
6	Mexico	3	1	2	6
7	Brazil	2	5	6	13
8	Colombia	2	1	1	4
9	Bahamas	1	2	1	4
10	Ecuador	1	1	1	3
11	Dominican Republic	1	0	0	1
11	Saint Lucia	1	0	0	1
11	Venezuela	1	0	0	1
14	Argentina	0	1	2	3
14	Barbados	0	1	2	3
16	Antigua and Barbuda	0	1	0	1
16	Grenada	0	1	0	1
16	Guatemala	0	1	0	1
16	Peru	0	1	0	1
16	Puerto Rico	0	1	0	1
21	Chile	0	0	2	2
21	Uruguay	0	0	2	2
23	Panama	0	0	1	1
23	Saint Kitts and Nevis	0	0	1	1
23	Saint Vincent and the Grenadines	0	0	1	1
Totals (25 entries)		47	47	48	142

== Medalists ==
Key
GR	Pan American Games record	AR	Area record	NR	National record	PB	Personal best	SB	Seasonal best

=== Men's events ===
Event	Gold		Silver		Bronze	
100 metres	Andre De Grasse; Canada	10.05	Ramon Gittens; Barbados	10.07	Antoine Adams; Saint Kitts and Nevis	10.09
200 metres	Andre De Grasse; Canada	19.88 PB	Rasheed Dwyer; Jamaica	19.90	Alonso Edward; Panama	19.90 SB
400 metres	Luguelín Santos; Dominican Republic	44.56 SB	Machel Cedenio; Trinidad and Tobago	44.70	Kyle Clemons; United States	44.84 PB
800 metres	Clayton Murphy; United States	1:47.19	Rafith Rodríguez; Colombia	1:47.23	Ryan Martin; United States	1:47.73
1500 metres	Andrew Wheating; United States	3:41.41	Nathan Brannen; Canada	3:41.66	Charles Philibert-Thiboutot; Canada	3:41.79
5000 metres	Juan Luis Barrios; Mexico	13:46.47	David Torrence; United States	13:46.60	Víctor Aravena; Chile	13:46.94 PB
10,000 metres	Mohammed Ahmed; Canada	28:49.96	Aron Rono; United States	28:50.83	Juan Luis Barrios; Mexico	28:51.57
110 m hurdles	David Oliver; United States	13.07 GR	Mikel Thomas; Trinidad and Tobago	13.17 PB	Shane Brathwaite; Barbados	13.21 PB
400 m hurdles	Jeffery Gibson; Bahamas	48.51 NR	Javier Culson; Puerto Rico	48.67	Roxroy Cato; Jamaica	48.72 SB
3000 m steeplechase	Matthew Hughes; Canada	8:32.18	Alex Genest; Canada	8:33.83	Cory Leslie; United States	8:36.83
4 × 100 m relay	United States; BeeJay Lee; Wallace Spearmon; Kendal Williams; Remontay McClain; Sean McLean	38.27	Brazil; Gustavo dos Santos; Vítor Hugo dos Santos; Bruno de Barros; Aldemir da Silva Junior	38.68	Trinidad and Tobago; Rondel Sorrillo; Keston Bledman; Emmanuel Callender; Dan-Neil Telesford; Mikel Thomas	38.69
4 × 400 m relay	Trinidad and Tobago; Renny Quow; Jarrin Solomon; Emanuel Mayers; Machel Cedenio; Jehue Gordon	2:59.60 SB	Cuba; William Collazo; Adrian Chacon; Osmaidel Pellicier; Yoandys Lescay	2:59.84 SB	United States; Kyle Clemons; James Harris; Marcus Chambers; Kerron Clement; Jeshua Anderson	3:00.21
Marathon	Richer Pérez; Cuba	2:17:04 PB	Raúl Pacheco; Peru	2:17:13	Mariano Mastromarino; Argentina	2:17:45
20 km walk	Evan Dunfee; Canada	1:23:06	Inaki Gomez; Canada	1:24:25	Caio Bonfim; Brazil	1:24:43
50 km walk	Andrés Chocho; Ecuador	3:50:13 SB	Erick Barrondo; Guatemala	3:55:57	Horacio Nava; Mexico	3:57:28
High jump	Derek Drouin; Canada	2.37 m SB	Michael Mason; Canada	2.31 m	Donald Thomas; Bahamas	2.28 m
Pole vault	Shawnacy Barber; Canada	5.80 m =GR	Germán Chiaraviglio; Argentina	5.75 m NR	Mark Hollis; United States; Jacob Blankenship; United States	5.40 m
Long jump ^{†}	Jeffery Henderson; United States	8.54 m	Marquise Goodwin; United States	8.27 m	Emiliano Lasa; Uruguay	8.17 m
Triple jump	Pedro Pablo Pichardo; Cuba	17.54 m	Leevan Sands; Bahamas	16.99 m SB	Ernesto Revé; Cuba	16.94 m
Shot put	O'Dayne Richards; Jamaica	21.69 m GR, NR	Tim Nedow; Canada	20.53 m	Germán Lauro; Argentina	20.24 m
Discus throw	Fedrick Dacres; Jamaica	64.80	Ronald Julião; Brazil	64.65 SB	Russell Winger; United States	62.64
Hammer throw	Kibwé Johnson; United States	75.46 m	Roberto Janet; Cuba	74.78 m	Conor McCullough; United States	73.74 m
Javelin throw	Keshorn Walcott; Trinidad and Tobago	83.27 m	Riley Dolezal; United States	81.62 m SB	Júlio César de Oliveira; Brazil	80.94 m
Decathlon	Damian Warner; Canada	8659 points GR NR	Kurt Felix; Grenada	8269 points PB	Luiz Alberto de Araújo; Brazil	8179 points SB

=== Women's events ===
Event	Gold		Silver		Bronze	
100 metres	Sherone Simpson; Jamaica	10.95 SB	Ángela Tenorio; Ecuador	10.99 AR	Barbara Pierre; United States	11.01
200 metres	Kaylin Whitney; United States	22.65	Kyra Jefferson; United States	22.72	Simone Facey; Jamaica	22.74
400 metres	Kendall Baisden; United States	51.27	Shakima Wimbley; United States	51.36	Kineke Alexander; Saint Vincent and the Grenadines	51.50
800 metres	Melissa Bishop; Canada	1.59.62	Alysia Montaño; United States	1.59.76	Flávia de Lima; Brazil	2.00.40
1500 metres	Muriel Coneo; Colombia	4.09.05 NR	Nicole Sifuentes; Canada	4:09.13	Sasha Gollish; Canada	4:10.11
5000 metres	Juliana Paula dos Santos; Brazil	15:45.97 PB	Brenda Flores; Mexico	15:47.19	Kellyn Taylor; United States	15:52.78
10,000 metres	Brenda Flores; Mexico	32:41.33 GR	Desiree Davila; United States	32:43.99 SB	Lanni Marchant; Canada	32:46.03
100 m hurdles	Queen Harrison; United States	12.52 GR	Tenaya Jones; United States	12.84	Nikkita Holder; Canada	12.85
400 m hurdles	Shamier Little; United States	55.50	Sarah Wells; Canada	56.17	Déborah Rodríguez; Uruguay	56.41
3000 m steeplechase	Ashley Higginson; United States	9:48.12 GR	Shalaya Kipp; United States	9:49.96	Geneviève Lalonde; Canada	9:53.03
4 × 100 m relay	United States; Barbara Pierre; LaKeisha Lawson; Morolake Akinosun; Kaylin Whitney	42.58 GR	Jamaica; Samantha Henry-Robinson; Kerron Stewart; Schillonie Calvert; Simone Facey; Sherone Simpson	42.68	Canada; Crystal Emmanuel; Kimberly Hyacinthe; Jellisa Westney; Khamica Bingham	43.00
4 × 400 m relay	United States; Shamier Little; Kyra Jefferson; Shakima Wimbley; Kendall Baisden; Alysia Montaño	3:25.68	Jamaica; Anastasia Le-Roy; Verone Chambers; Chrisann Gordon; Bobby-Gaye Wilkins	3:27.27	Canada; Brianne Theisen-Eaton; Taylor Sharpe; Sage Watson; Sarah Wells; Audrey Jean-Baptiste	3:27.74 SB
Marathon	Adriana Aparecida da Silva; Brazil	2:35:40 GR	Lindsay Flanagan; United States	2:36:30	Rachel Hannah; Canada	2:41:06
20 km walk	Lupita González; Mexico	1:29:24 GR	Érica de Sena; Brazil	1:30:08	Paola Pérez; Ecuador	1:31:53 PB
High jump	Levern Spencer; Saint Lucia	1.94 m	Priscilla Frederick; Antigua and Barbuda	1.91 m PB	Akela Jones; Barbados	1.91 m PB
Pole vault	Yarisley Silva; Cuba	4.85 m GR	Fabiana Murer; Brazil	4.80 m	Jenn Suhr; United States	4.60 m
Long jump	Christabel Nettey; Canada	6.90 m	Bianca Stuart; Bahamas	6.69 m	Sha'Keela Saunders; United States	6.66 m
Triple jump	Caterine Ibargüen; Colombia	15.08 m	Keila Costa; Brazil	14.50 m	Yosiris Urrutia; Colombia	14.38 m
Shot put	Cleopatra Borel; Trinidad and Tobago	18.67 m	Jillian Camarena-Williams; United States	18.65 m	Natalia Ducó; Chile	18.01 m
Discus throw	Denia Caballero; Cuba	65.39 m	Yaime Pérez; Cuba	64.99 m	Gia Lewis-Smallwood; United States	61.26 m
Hammer throw	Rosa Rodríguez; Venezuela	71.61 m	Amber Campbell; United States	71.22 m	Sultana Frizell; Canada	69.51 m
Javelin throw	Elizabeth Gleadle; Canada	62.83 m	Kara Winger; United States	61.44 m	Jucilene de Lima; Brazil	60.42 m
Heptathlon	Yorgelis Rodríguez; Cuba	6332 points GR	Heather Miller; United States	6178 points	Vanessa Spínola; Brazil	6035 points

== Participating nations ==
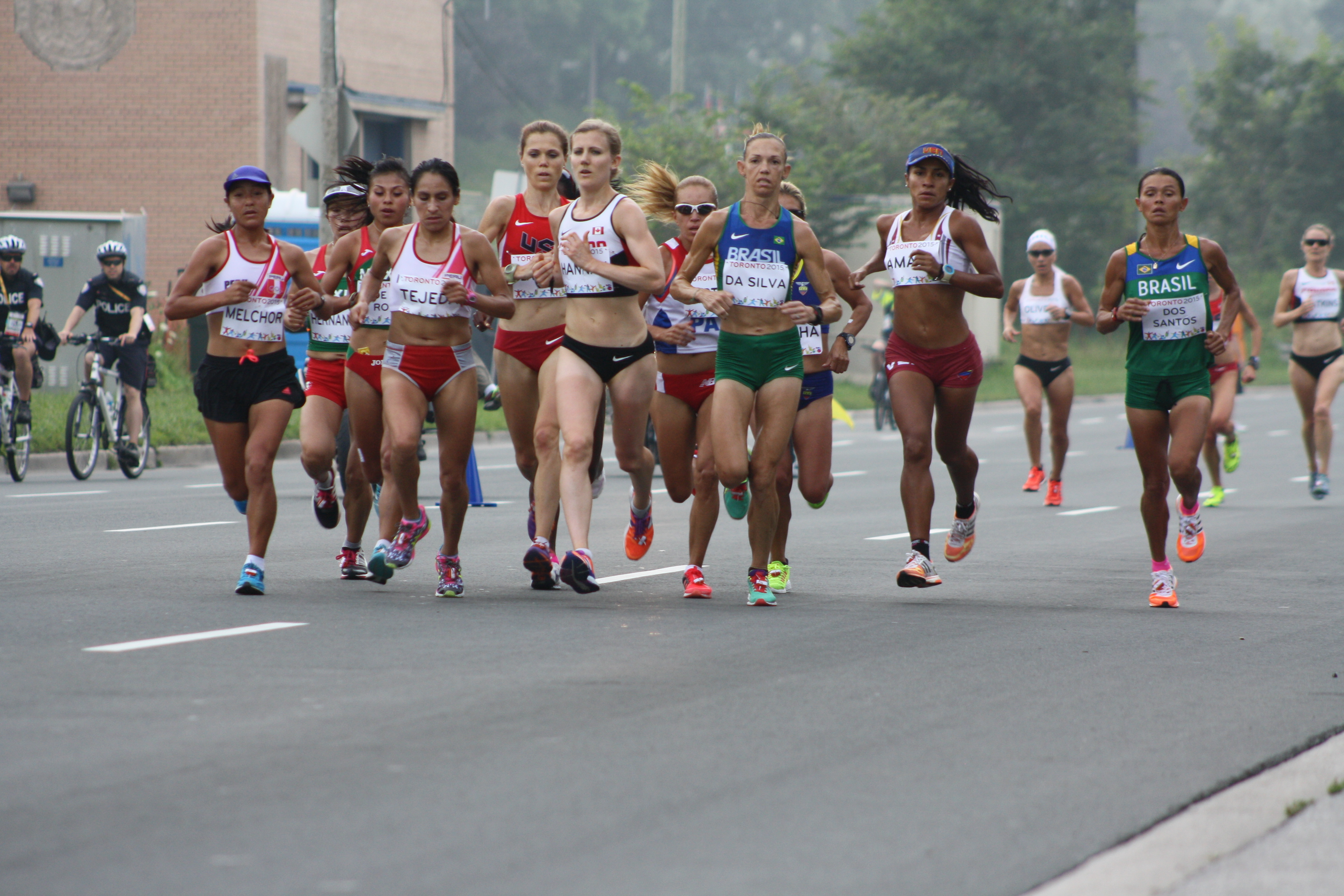
The lead pack in the Pan American Games women's marathon.

All 41 participating countries have qualified athletes. The number of athletes a nation has entered is in parentheses beside the name of the country.

- Antigua and Barbuda (6)
- Argentina (11)
- Aruba (1)
- Bahamas (29)
- Barbados (14)
- Belize (2)
- Bermuda (5)
- Bolivia (4)
- Brazil (80)
- British Virgin Islands (4)
- Canada (88)
- Cayman Islands (2)
- Chile (37)
- Colombia (22)
- Costa Rica (9)
- Cuba (58)
- Dominica (4)
- Dominican Republic (1)
- Ecuador (16)
- El Salvador (2)
- Grenada (4)
- Guatemala (7)
- Guyana (3)
- Haiti (6)
- Honduras (1)
- Jamaica (41)
- Mexico (35)
- Nicaragua (2)
- Panama (6)
- Paraguay (3)
- Peru (13)
- Puerto Rico (15)
- Saint Kitts and Nevis (8)
- Saint Lucia (2)
- Saint Vincent and the Grenadines (2)
- Suriname (2)
- Trinidad and Tobago (32)
- United States (84)
- Uruguay (5)
- Venezuela (27)
- Virgin Islands (5)

== Qualification ==
A total of 680 athletes will qualify to compete at the games. A nation may enter a maximum of two athletes per event, granted they meet the qualification standard. Qualification times and standards can be set from January 1, 2014, to June 28, 2015. The winner of each event contested at the 2014 Pan American Sports Festival will also qualify. Furthermore, a total of sixteen relay teams per event will qualify as well.

== See also ==
- 2015 World Championships in Athletics
- Athletics at the 2016 Summer Olympics
