= Remontay McClain =

American sprinter

Personal information
- Nationality: American
- Born: September 21, 1992 (age 33) Victorville, California, U.S.
- Height: 6 ft 2 in (1.88 m)
- Weight: 193 lb (88 kg)

Sport
- Sport: Running
- Events: 100 metres, 200 metres

Achievements and titles
- Personal bests: 60 m: 6.64 s (Azusa 2012); 100 m: 10.07 s (Eugene 2015); 200 m: 20.33 s (Chula Vista 2012)
Medal record
Men's Athletics
Representing the United States
Pan American Games
Gold medal – first place	2015 Toronto	4x100 m
NACAC Championships
Gold medal – first place	2015 Costa Rica	100 m

Remontay McClain (born September 21, 1992) is an American sprinter who specializes in the 100 and 200 metres dash. While attending Covina High School, McClain ran the second-fastest 100 metres by a high school athlete in 2010, behind only Oliver Bradwell.

A native of Victorville, California, McClain moved to Covina, California when he was 13. In his junior year at Covina High School, McClain won both the 100 m and 200 m California state championship. He was named a 2010 and 2011 All-USA track and field selection by USA Today. In his senior year, McClain repeated as 100 m and 200 m state champion, by setting Division 3 meet records in both events. He became only the third athlete in the 93 competitions of the CIF State Track and Field Championship meet to win back-to-back titles in the 100 and 200 meters, following Charlie Paddock (1917, 1918) and Randall Carroll (2008, 2009).

Also an American football player, McClain was listed as one of the best wide receivers in Southern California before Covina was knocked out of the CIF playoffs by Whittier Christian High School his senior season. He committed to Azusa Pacific University on November 10, 2010.

== 2010 ==
In June, McClain finished 9th in 21.89 in 200 meter prelims and 9th in 10.56 in 100 meter prelims at USATF Junior Outdoor Championships hosted at Drake Stadium in Des Moines, Iowa.

== 2011 ==
In June, McClain finished 5th in 10.33 in 100 meter prelims at USATF Junior Outdoor Championships hosted at Hayward Field in Eugene, Oregon.

== 2013 ==
In June, McClain finished 10th in 20.90 in 200 meter at USATF Outdoor Championships hosted at Drake Stadium in Des Moines, Iowa.

== 2014 ==
In June, McClain finished 9th in 20.49 in 200 meter and qualified for the 100 meter semifinal in 10.30 at USATF Outdoor Championships hosted at Hornet Stadium in Sacramento, California.

== 2015 ==
In June, McClain finished 5th in 10.07 in 100 meter at USATF Outdoor Championships hosted at Hayward Field, Eugene, Oregon.

On August 8, McClain won the 100 metre NACAC 2015 Senior Championships hosted at Estadio Nacional de Costa Rica, San Jose, Costa Rica.

== Personal bests ==
Event	Time (seconds)	Venue	Date
60 meters	6.64	Azusa Pacific University, Azusa, California	February 11, 2012
100 meters	10.07	Eugene, OR	June 28, 2015
200 meters	20.12	Cerritos College, Cerritos, CA	June 6, 2015

=== Track records ===
As of 6 September 2024, McClain holds the following track records for 100 metres and 200 metres.

==== 100 metres ====
Location	Time	Windspeed m/s	Date
Cerritos, California	10.08	+ 0.9	06/06/2015
Redlands	10.04	+ 5.0	18/05/2017
San Jose	10.09	– 0.1	08/08/2015

==== 200 metres ====
Location	Time	Windspeed m/s	Date
Chula Vista, CA	20.33	+ 2.4	09/06/2012
