= Elroy McBride =

Bahamian sprinter

Personal information
- Born: December 23, 1993 (age 32)
Medal record
Athletics
Representing Bahamas
CARIFTA Games Junior (U20)
Gold medal – first place	2012 Hamilton	4×400 m relay

Elroy McBride (born December 23, 1993) is a Bahamian sprinter from Abaco Islands in The Bahamas who competed in the 200m and 400. He attended Moores Island All-Age School in Moore's Island where he was a part of the Exterminators Track and Field Club, Coached by Pastor Anthony Williams. He then went on to compete for Southwestern Christian College and Texas Tech University.

McBride ran the 200m at the 2015 NACAC Championships in Athletics in San Jose, Costa Rica. He was also a part of the 4x100 relay at the 2015 Pan American Games in Toronto, Canada and the 2015 World Athletics Championships in Beijing, China. He ran on the 4x400 Relay Team at the 2017 IAAF World Relays in Nassau, Bahamas. As a Junior he competed in the 400m and 4x400 relay at the 2012 World Junior Championships in Athletics in Barcelona, Spain.

== Personal bests ==
Event	Time	Venue	Date
200 m	20.85 (+0.1)	Nassau, Bahamas	25 JUN 2016
200 m	20.67 (+2.2)	Lubbock, Texas	30 APR 2015
400m	46.73	Lubbock, Texas	30 APR 2015
