= Levi Cadogan =

Barbadian sprinter (born 1995)

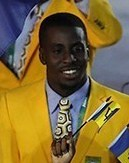
- Cadogan in 2016

Personal information
- Born: 8 November 1995 (age 31) Bridgetown, Barbados

Sport
- Sport: Track and field
Medal record
Representing Barbados
Central American and Caribbean Games
Silver medal – second place	2014 Veracruz	100 m

Levi Asher Cadogan (born 8 November 1995) is retired Barbadian athlete who specialised in the sprinting events. He won the silver medal at the 2014 Central American and Caribbean Games and finished fourth at the 2014 World Junior Championships.

Cadogan served a 20 month competition ban from 2017 to 2019 for violating anti-doping regulations after being found to have unintentionally ingested furosemide.

== Personal best ==
Event	Result	Venue	Date
Outdoor
100 metres	10.06 (wind: +1.7 m/s)	(Barbados) Saint Michael	20 June 2017
200 metres	20.45 (wind: +0.0 m/s)	(Barbados) Bridgetown	27 June 2016
Indoor
60 metres	6.62	(Germany) Karlsruhe	6 February 2016

== Competition record ==
Year	Competition	Venue	Position	Event	Notes
Representing Barbados
2012	Central American and Caribbean Junior Championships (U20)	San Salvador, El Salvador	4th	100 m	10.71
2012	Central American and Caribbean Junior Championships (U20)	San Salvador, El Salvador	6th	200 m	21.58
2012	Central American and Caribbean Junior Championships (U20)	San Salvador, El Salvador	2nd	4 × 400 m	3:14.31
2013	Central American and Caribbean Championships	Morelia, Mexico	4th	4 × 100 m	39.56
2013	World Championships	Moscow, Russia	15th (h)	4 × 100 m	38.94
2014	CARIFTA Games (U20)	Fort-de-France, Martinique	2nd	100 m	10.25
2014	CARIFTA Games (U20)	Fort-de-France, Martinique	3rd	200 m	20.67
2014	CARIFTA Games (U20)	Fort-de-France, Martinique	4th	4 × 400 m	3:18.33
2014	IAAF World Relays	Nassau, Bahamas	16th (h)	4 × 100 m	39.27
2014	IAAF World Relays	Nassau, Bahamas	4th	4 × 200 m	1:21.88
2014	World Junior Championships	Eugene, Oregon, United States	4th	100m	10.39 (wind: -0.6 m/s)
2014	World Junior Championships	Eugene, Oregon, United States	15th (h)	4 × 100 m relay	41.39
2014	Central American and Caribbean Games	Veracruz, Mexico	2nd	100 m	10.27
2014	Central American and Caribbean Games	Veracruz, Mexico	7th (sf)	200 m	21.16
2015	NACAC Championships	San José, Costa Rica	3rd	100 m	10.13 (-0.1 m/s)
2015	NACAC Championships	San José, Costa Rica	3rd	4 × 100 m relay	38.55
2015	World Championships	Beijing, China	19th (sf)	100 m	10.19
2016	NACAC U23 Championships	San Salvador, El Salvador	3rd	100 m	10.37
2016	NACAC U23 Championships	San Salvador, El Salvador	4th	200 m	20.86
2016	Olympic Games	Rio de Janeiro, Brazil	67th (h)	200 m	21.02
2017	World Championships	London, United Kingdom	14th (h)	4 × 100 m relay	39.19
