= Rondel Sorrillo =

Trinidad and Tobago sprinter

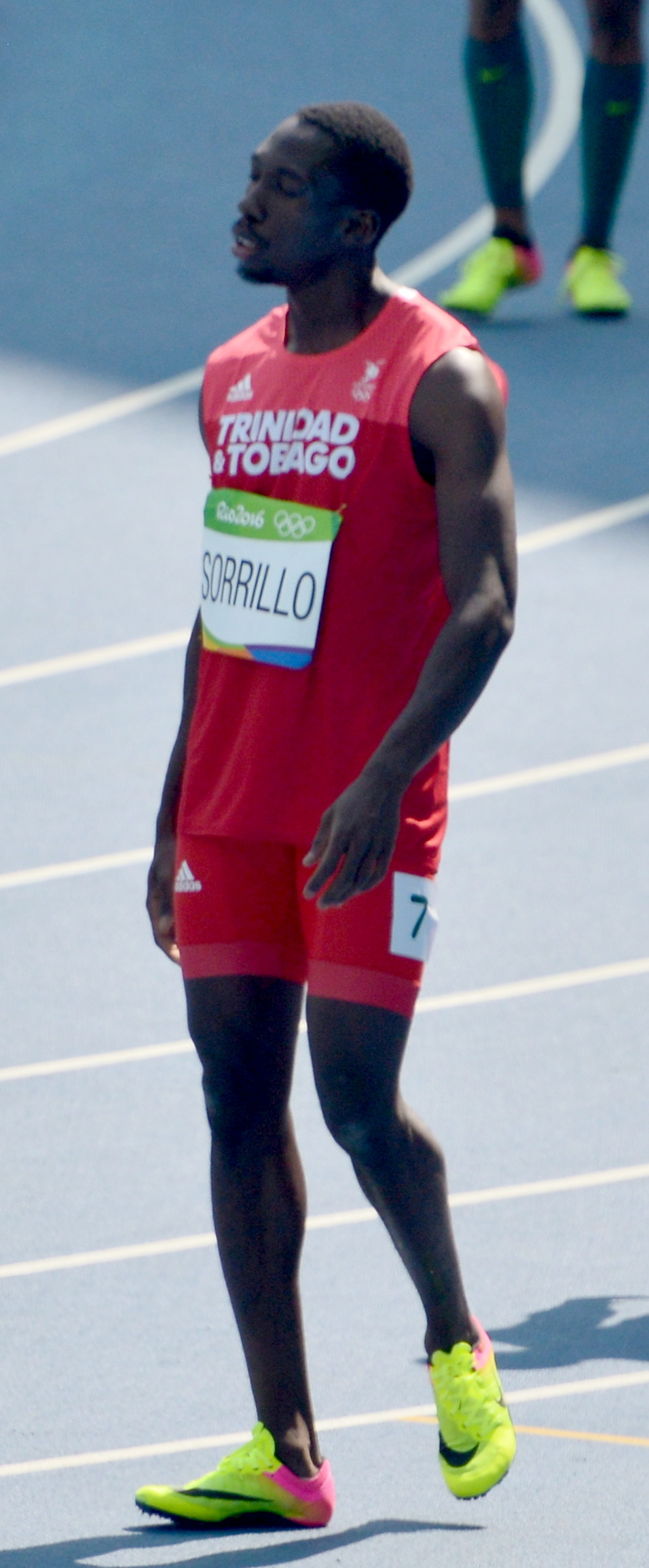
- Sorrillo at the 2016 Olympics

Personal information
- Nationality: Trinidad and Tobago
- Born: 24 January 1986 (age 40) La Brea, Trinidad and Tobago
- Education: University of Trinidad and Tobago; University of Kentucky
- Height: 1.78 m (5 ft 10 in)
- Weight: 62 kg (137 lb)

Sport
- Country: Trinidad and Tobago
- Sport: Track and field
- Events: Sprints, 100 metres, 200 metres
- College team: University of Kentucky
- Club: Palo Seco; Kentucky Wildcats; La Brea
- Coached by: Edrick Floreal

Achievements and titles
- Personal bests: 100 m: 9.99; 200 m: 20.16
Medal record
Representing Trinidad and Tobago
Commonwealth Games
Bronze medal – third place	2014 Glasgow	4 x 100m relay
Pan American Games
Bronze medal – third place	2015 Toronto	4 x 100m relay
Central American and Caribbean Games
Gold medal – first place	2010 Mayaguez	4 x 100m relay
Silver medal – second place	2010 Mayaguez	200 m

Rondel Kelvin Sorrillo (born 24 January 1986) is a Trinidad and Tobago sprinter, who specializes in the 200 metres. He was the first University of Kentucky athlete to win the men's 200 m title at the NCAA championships, winning it in 2010.

Sorrillo competed in the 200 meters event at the 2008 Olympic Games, but without reaching the final round. He ran a personal best for the 100 m at the 2012 national championships, placing third with a time of 10.03 seconds. He represented Trinidad and Tobago in both the 100 and 200 metres at the 2012 Summer Olympics.

He was part of the Trinidad and Tobago 4 × 100 m team that won the bronze medal at the 2014 Commonwealth Games.

His personal best time for the 200 metres is 20.16 seconds. He also has a 9.99 second (+1.7) personal best in the 100 meters, achieved in 2016 while finishing second in the Trinidad and Tobago Olympic Trials. At 30 years, 152 days, he became the third oldest person to achieve a sub-10 second time for the first time; and 6.57 seconds in the 60 meters, achieved in January 2015 in Lexington.

== International competitions ==
Year	Competition	Venue	Position	Event	Notes
Representing Trinidad and Tobago
2006	NACAC U23 Championships	Santo Domingo, Dominican Republic	3rd	4 × 100 m relay	39.98
2007	NACAC Championships	San Salvador, El Salvador	3rd	4 × 100 m relay	39.92
2008	Central American and Caribbean Championships	Cali, Colombia	2nd	200 m	20.71
2008	Olympic Games	Beijing, China	21st (qf)	200 m	20.63
2009	Central American and Caribbean Championships	Havana, Cuba	2nd	200 m	20.72
2009	Central American and Caribbean Championships	Havana, Cuba	1st	4 × 100 m relay	38.73
2009	World Championships	Berlin, Germany	13th (sf)	200 m	20.63
2010	Central American and Caribbean Games	Mayagüez, Puerto Rico	2nd	200 m	20.59
2010	Central American and Caribbean Games	Mayagüez, Puerto Rico	1st	4 × 100 m relay	38.24
2011	Central American and Caribbean Championships	Mayagüez, Puerto Rico	2nd	200 m	20.64
2011	Central American and Caribbean Championships	Mayagüez, Puerto Rico	2nd	4 × 100 m relay	38.89
2011	World Championships	Daegu, South Korea	7th	200 m	20.34
2012	Olympic Games	London, United Kingdom	23rd (sf)	100 m	10.31
2012	Olympic Games	London, United Kingdom	34th (h)	200 m	20.76
2013	World Championships	Moscow, Russia	26th (h)	200 m	10.25
2013	World Championships	Moscow, Russia	7th	4 × 100 m relay	38.57
2014	IAAF World Relays	Nassau, Bahamas	2nd	4 × 100 m relay	38.04
2014	Commonwealth Games	Glasgow, United Kingdom	9th	200 m	20.57
2014	Commonwealth Games	Glasgow, United Kingdom	3rd	4 × 100 m relay	38.10
2016	World Indoor Championships	Portland, United States	20th (sf)	60 m	6.68
2016	World Indoor Championships	Portland, United States	5th (h)	4 × 400 m relay	3:07.83
2016	Olympic Games	Rio de Janeiro, Brazil	29th (h)	100 m	10.23
2016	Olympic Games	Rio de Janeiro, Brazil	14th (sf)	200 m	20.33
2016	Olympic Games	Rio de Janeiro, Brazil	6th (h)	4 × 100 m relay	37.96^{1}

^{1}Disqualified in the final
