= 2011 World Championships in Athletics – Men's 100 metres =

Men's 100 metres at the 2011 World Championships
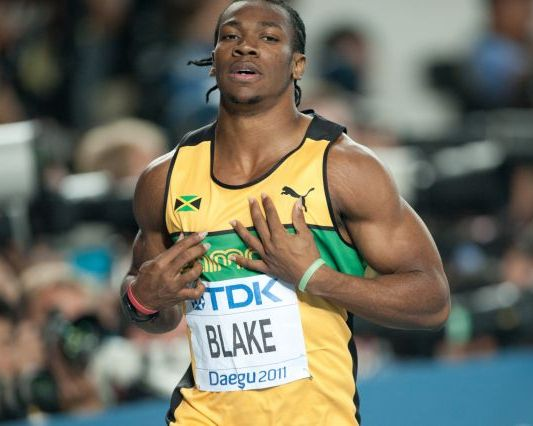
- Yohan Blake became the event's youngest ever champion amidst Usain Bolt's disqualification.
- Venue: Daegu Stadium
- Dates: 27 August (heats); 28 August (finals)
- Competitors: 74 from 61 nations

Medalists
| gold medal | Yohan Blake (9.92); Jamaica |
| silver medal | Walter Dix (10.08); United States |
| bronze medal | Kim Collins (10.09); Saint Kitts and Nevis |

Official Video

The men's 100 metres at the 2011 World Championships in Athletics was held at the Daegu Stadium on August 27 and August 28. The event was won by Yohan Blake of Jamaica, who became the youngest ever world champion in the 100 metres at 21 years, 245 days, as highly favored defending champion and world record holder Usain Bolt was disqualified from the final for making a false start. Seventy four athletes started the competition, with 61 nations being represented (18 of them in the preliminaries only). It was the first global final to be held following the introduction of the no-false start rule.

The four fastest 100-metre runners of 2011 were absent: Mike Rodgers (9.85 sec) and Steve Mullings (9.80 sec) had been banned for doping offences, while Tyson Gay (9.79 sec) and 2011 world leader Asafa Powell (9.78 sec) could not compete due to injuries.

A preliminary round was introduced, where those entrants who had not obtained the 100 m qualification standard had to compete in a further qualifying stage before making it into the first round proper. This reduced the event to a three-round competition, as opposed to the traditional four, for qualified runners. Kim Kuk-Young (the host nation's sole entrant) was disqualified in this round for a false start. Abdouraim Haroun was the fastest preliminary runner, Keiron Rogers broke the Anguillian record, and while the slowest of the round was Sogelau Tuvalu, his time of 15.66 seconds was a personal best for the shot put specialist.

Usain Bolt had the fastest time of the first day (10.10) while his Jamaican compatriots won three of the other seven heats. Christophe Lemaitre, Kim Collins and Walter Dix were the other winners. In the first of the semi-finals, Yohan Blake became the first man under ten seconds. Bolt won the second race as the second-fastest qualifier (10.05) and Collins won the third to become the oldest ever 100 m finalist. Frenchman Jimmy Vicaut became only the second junior athlete ever to qualify for the 100 m final, after Darrel Brown in 2003. The most prominent eliminations were Olympic silver medallist Richard Thompson (the fastest entrant that year with 9.85 sec) and 2004 Olympic champion Justin Gatlin. Dwain Chambers (a 2009 finalist) false-started, while sub-9.9 sec runners Michael Frater and Ngonidzashe Makusha also failed to progress.

In the 100 m final defending champion Usain Bolt caused an upset by false starting – Yohan Blake had made a slight movement but Bolt was the one who left his blocks, being immediately disqualified. In his absence, it was quick starter Kim Collins who led for the first half of the race. However, Blake was strongest in the second half, taking the lead and sprinting to win the gold medal with a time of 9.92 seconds into the −1.4 m/s headwind. Walter Dix made up ground on Collins, with the American edging into the silver medal position at the line by a margin of 0.01 seconds. At 35 years, 145 days old, bronze medallist Collins became the oldest ever world medallist for the men's 100 m.

== Medalists ==
| Gold | Silver | Bronze |
|---|---|---|
| Yohan Blake; Jamaica | Walter Dix; United States | Kim Collins; Saint Kitts and Nevis |

== Records ==
Prior to the competition, the records were as follows:

| World record | Usain Bolt (JAM) | 9.58 | Berlin, Germany | 16 August 2009 |
| Championship record | Usain Bolt (JAM) | 9.58 | Berlin, Germany | 16 August 2009 |
| World Leading | Asafa Powell (JAM) | 9.78 | Lausanne, Switzerland | 30 June 2011 |
| African Record | Olusoji Fasuba (NGR) | 9.85 | Doha, Qatar | 12 May 2006 |
| Asian Record | Samuel Francis (QAT) | 9.99 | Amman, Jordan | 26 July 2007 |
| North, Central American and Caribbean record | Usain Bolt (JAM) | 9.58 | Berlin, Germany | 16 August 2009 |
| South American Record | Robson da Silva (BRA) | 10.00 | Mexico, Mexico | 22 July 1988 |
| European Record | Francis Obikwelu (POR) | 9.86 | Athens, Greece | 22 August 2004 |
| Oceanian record | Patrick Johnson (AUS) | 9.93 | Mito, Japan | 5 May 2003 |

== Qualification standards ==
| A time | B time |
|---|---|
| 10.18 | 10.25 |

== Schedule ==
| Date | Time | Round |
|---|---|---|
| August 27, 2011 | 12:55 | Preliminary round |
| August 27, 2011 | 21:45 | Heats |
| August 28, 2011 | 18:30 | Semifinals |
| August 28, 2011 | 20:45 | Final |

== Results ==
| KEY: | q | Fastest non-qualifiers | Q | Qualified | NR | National record | PB | Personal best | SB | Seasonal best |

=== Preliminary round ===
Qualification: First 3 in each heat (Q) and the next 1 fastest (q) advance to the heats.

Wind:
Heat 1: +1.7 m/s, Heat 2: +1.2 m/s, Heat 3: -1.3 m/s, Heat 4: -0.9 m/s

| Rank | Heat | Name | Nationality | Time | Notes |
|---|---|---|---|---|---|
| 1 | 1 | Abdouraim Haroun | Chad | 10.44 | Q, NR |
| 2 | 2 | Chi Ho Tsui | Hong Kong | 10.45 | Q |
| 3 | 1 | Keiron Rogers | Anguilla | 10.55 | Q, NR |
| 4 | 3 | Gérard Kobéané | Burkina Faso | 10.64 | Q |
| 5 | 2 | Mohamed Fadlin | Indonesia | 10.70 | Q |
| 6 | 3 | Geronimo Goeloe | Aruba | 10.73 | Q, SB |
| 7 | 3 | Foo Ee Yeo | Singapore | 10.76 | Q |
| 8 | 4 | Noor Imran Hadi | Malaysia | 10.77 | Q |
| 9 | 1 | Jurgen Themen | Suriname | 10.84 | Q |
| 10 | 3 | Delivert Arsene Kimbembe | Congo | 10.85 | q |
| 11 | 4 | Dmitrii Ilin | Kyrgyzstan | 10.86 | Q |
| 12 | 2 | Tilak Ram Tharu | Nepal | 11.00 | Q, PB |
| 13 | 4 | Moudjib Toyb | Comoros | 11.07 | Q |
| 14 | 4 | Karl Farrugia | Malta | 11.21 | |
| 15 | 4 | Francis Manioru | Solomon Islands | 11.28 | SB |
| 16 | 2 | Rodman Teltull | Palau | 11.31 | PB |
| 17 | 1 | George Pine | Kiribati | 11.34 | SB |
| 18 | 1 | Kitavanah Kountavong | Laos | 11.42 | PB |
| 18 | 4 | Federico Gorrieri | San Marino | 11.42 | |
| 20 | 1 | Joshua Jeremiah | Nauru | 11.44 | PB |
| 21 | 3 | Joseph Andy Lui | Tonga | 11.48 | |
| 22 | 3 | Bledee Jarry | Liberia | 11.49 | PB |
| 23 | 2 | Mohamed Ghassem Ahmed Taled | Mauritania | 11.50 | PB |
| 24 | 1 | Okilani Tinilau | Tuvalu | 11.58 | |
| 25 | 1 | Christopher Lima da Costa | São Tomé and Príncipe | 11.61 | PB |
| 26 | 2 | Massoud Azizi | Afghanistan | 11.64 | SB |
| 27 | 2 | John Howard | Federated States of Micronesia | 11.71 | SB |
| 28 | 3 | Ah Chong Sam Chong | Samoa | 12.36 | PB |
| 29 | 3 | Orrin Ogumoro Pharmin | Northern Mariana Islands | 12.60 | PB |
| 30 | 4 | Sogelau Tuvalu | American Samoa | 15.66 | PB |
| | 2 | Kim Kuk-Young | South Korea | DQ | |

=== Heats ===
Qualification: First 3 in each heat (Q) and the next 3 fastest (q) advance to the semifinals.

Wind:
Heat 1: −1.7 m/s, Heat 2: −1.7 m/s, Heat 3: −1.0 m/s, Heat 4: −1.3 m/s, Heat 5: −1.2 m/s, Heat 6: −0.7 m/s, Heat 7: −1.2 m/s

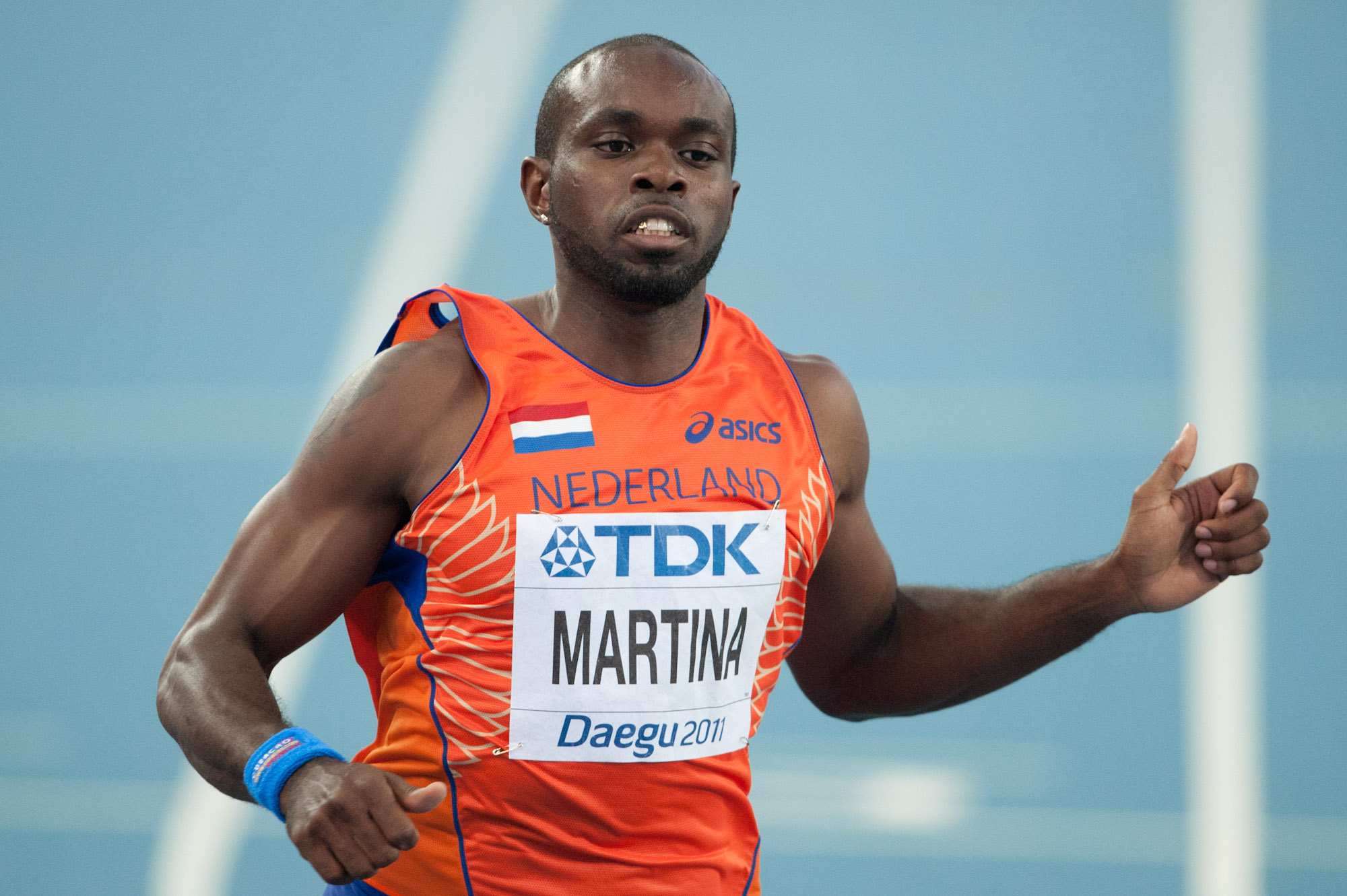
Churandy Martina competing in Daegu

| Rank | Heat | Name | Nationality | Time | Notes |
|---|---|---|---|---|---|
| 1 | 6 | Usain Bolt | Jamaica | 10.10 | Q |
| 2 | 4 | Yohan Blake | Jamaica | 10.12 | Q |
| 3 | 1 | Kim Collins | Saint Kitts and Nevis | 10.13 | Q |
| 4 | 3 | Christophe Lemaitre | France | 10.14 | Q |
| 5 | 2 | Walter Dix | United States | 10.25 | Q |
| 5 | 4 | Jimmy Vicaut | France | 10.25 | Q |
| 7 | 5 | Nesta Carter | Jamaica | 10.26 | Q |
| 7 | 7 | Michael Frater | Jamaica | 10.26 | Q |
| 9 | 2 | Harry Aikines-Aryeetey | Great Britain & N.I. | 10.28 | Q |
| 9 | 6 | Dwain Chambers | Great Britain & N.I. | 10.28 | Q |
| 11 | 3 | Justin Gatlin | United States | 10.31 | Q |
| 11 | 4 | Ngonidzashe Makusha | Zimbabwe | 10.31 | Q |
| 13 | 1 | Trell Kimmons | United States | 10.32 | Q |
| 13 | 2 | Keston Bledman | Trinidad and Tobago | 10.32 | Q |
| 13 | 3 | Churandy Martina | Netherlands | 10.32 | Q |
| 16 | 4 | Justyn Warner | Canada | 10.33 | q |
| 16 | 7 | Jaysuma Saidy Ndure | Norway | 10.33 | Q |
| 18 | 1 | Richard Thompson | Trinidad and Tobago | 10.34 | Q |
| 18 | 5 | Daniel Bailey | Antigua and Barbuda | 10.34 | Q |
| 18 | 3 | Marlon Devonish | Great Britain & N.I. | 10.34 | q |
| 21 | 7 | Dariusz Kuć | Poland | 10.36 | Q |
| 22 | 6 | Ángel David Rodríguez | Spain | 10.37 | Q |
| 23 | 2 | Andrew Hinds | Barbados | 10.41 | q |
| 24 | 5 | Aziz Ouhadi | Morocco | 10.42 | Q |
| 24 | 5 | Rytis Sakalauskas | Lithuania | 10.42 | |
| 24 | 4 | Ramon Gittens | Barbados | 10.42 | |
| 27 | 7 | Reto Schenkel | Switzerland | 10.44 | |
| 28 | 4 | Ben Youssef Meité | Ivory Coast | 10.45 | |
| 29 | 7 | Aaron Armstrong | Trinidad and Tobago | 10.48 | |
| 30 | 1 | Suwaibou Sanneh | Gambia | 10.50 | |
| 31 | 1 | Ronalds Arājs | Latvia | 10.52 | |
| 32 | 5 | Marek Niit | Estonia | 10.53 | |
| 32 | 6 | Simon Magakwe | South Africa | 10.53 | |
| 34 | 6 | Nilson André | Brazil | 10.54 | |
| 35 | 5 | Aziz Zakari | Ghana | 10.55 | |
| 36 | 2 | Jason Smyth | Ireland | 10.57 | |
| 36 | 2 | Ogho-Oghene Egwero | Nigeria | 10.57 | |
| 38 | 1 | Peter Emelieze | Nigeria | 10.58 | |
| 39 | 4 | Gérard Kobéané | Burkina Faso | 10.59 | |
| 40 | 6 | Gerald Phiri | Zambia | 10.60 | |
| 41 | 3 | Carlos Jorge | Dominican Republic | 10.62 | |
| 41 | 7 | Álvaro Gómez | Colombia | 10.62 | |
| 43 | 3 | Gabriel Mvumvure | Zimbabwe | 10.63 | |
| 44 | 7 | Chi Ho Tsui | Hong Kong | 10.65 | |
| 45 | 6 | Abdouraim Haroun | Chad | 10.72 | |
| 46 | 5 | Mohammad Noor Imran A Hadi | Malaysia | 10.75 | |
| 47 | 2 | Geronimo Goeloe | Aruba | 10.84 | |
| 48 | 5 | Foo Ee Yeo | Singapore | 10.85 | |
| 49 | 1 | Delivert Arsene Kimbembe | Congo | 10.94 | |
| 49 | 4 | Jurgen Themen | Suriname | 10.94 | |
| 51 | 3 | Keiron Rogers | Anguilla | 10.96 | |
| 52 | 2 | Mohamed Fadlin | Indonesia | 11.00 | |
| 52 | 3 | Dmitrii Ilin | Kyrgyzstan | 11.00 | |
| 54 | 6 | Moudjib Toyb | Comoros | 11.12 | |
| 55 | 7 | Tilak Ram Tharu | Nepal | 11.32 | |
| | 1 | Adrian Griffith | Bahamas | DQ | |

=== Semifinals ===
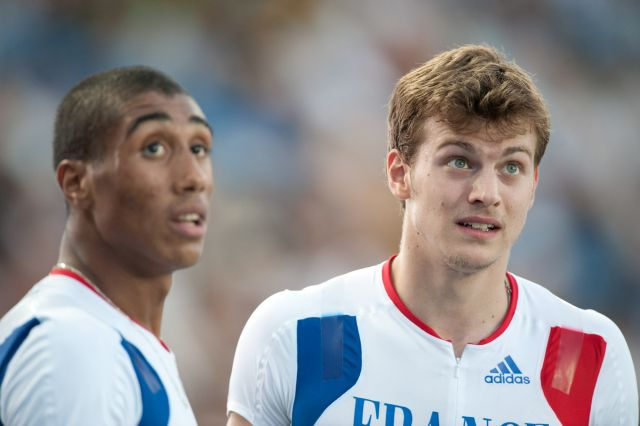
Frenchmen Jimmy Vicaut and Christophe Lemaitre both made the final.

Qualification: First 2 in each heat (Q) and the next 2 fastest (q) advance to the Final.

Wind:
Heat 1: −0.4 m/s, Heat 2: −1.0 m/s, Heat 3: −0.8 m/s

| Rank | Heat | Name | Nationality | Time | Notes |
|---|---|---|---|---|---|
| 1 | 1 | Yohan Blake | Jamaica | 9.95 | Q, SB |
| 2 | 1 | Walter Dix | United States | 10.05 | Q |
| 2 | 2 | Usain Bolt | Jamaica | 10.05 | Q |
| 4 | 3 | Kim Collins | Saint Kitts and Nevis | 10.08 | Q |
| 5 | 1 | Jimmy Vicaut | France | 10.10 | q |
| 6 | 2 | Christophe Lemaitre | France | 10.11 | Q |
| 7 | 1 | Daniel Bailey | Antigua and Barbuda | 10.14 | q |
| 8 | 1 | Keston Bledman | Trinidad and Tobago | 10.14 | |
| 9 | 3 | Nesta Carter | Jamaica | 10.16 | Q |
| 10 | 2 | Richard Thompson | Trinidad and Tobago | 10.20 | |
| 11 | 2 | Trell Kimmons | United States | 10.21 | |
| 11 | 2 | Jaysuma Saidy Ndure | Norway | 10.21 | |
| 13 | 2 | Michael Frater | Jamaica | 10.23 | |
| 13 | 3 | Harry Aikines-Aryeetey | Great Britain & N.I. | 10.23 | |
| 13 | 3 | Justin Gatlin | United States | 10.23 | |
| 16 | 2 | Marlon Devonish | Great Britain & N.I. | 10.25 | |
| 17 | 3 | Ngonidzashe Makusha | Zimbabwe | 10.27 | |
| 18 | 3 | Churandy Martina | Netherlands | 10.29 | |
| 19 | 1 | Andrew Hinds | Barbados | 10.32 | |
| 20 | 3 | Aziz Ouhadi | Morocco | 10.45 | |
| 21 | 3 | Justyn Warner | Canada | 10.47 | |
| 22 | 1 | Ángel David Rodríguez | Spain | 10.49 | |
| 23 | 2 | Dariusz Kuć | Poland | 10.51 | |
| | 1 | Dwain Chambers | Great Britain & N.I. | DQ | |

=== Final ===
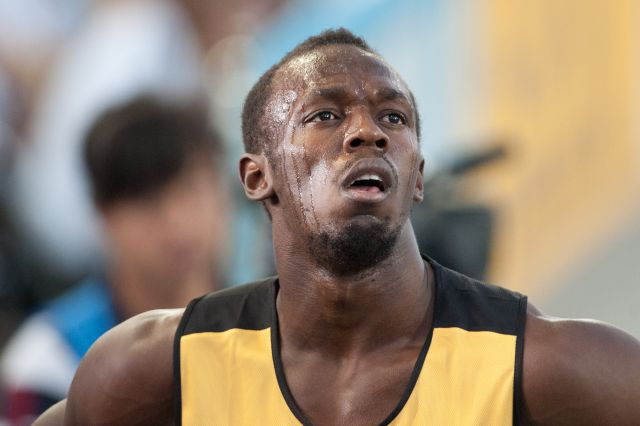
Defending champion Usain Bolt false started and was disqualified.

Wind: −1.4 m/s

| Rank | Lane | Name | Nationality | Time | Notes |
|---|---|---|---|---|---|
| 1st place, gold medalist(s) | 6 | Yohan Blake | Jamaica | 9.92 | SB |
| 2nd place, silver medalist(s) | 4 | Walter Dix | United States | 10.08 | |
| 3rd place, bronze medalist(s) | 3 | Kim Collins | Saint Kitts and Nevis | 10.09 | |
| 4 | 8 | Christophe Lemaitre | France | 10.19 | |
| 5 | 2 | Daniel Bailey | Antigua and Barbuda | 10.26 | |
| 6 | 1 | Jimmy Vicaut | France | 10.27 | |
| 7 | 7 | Nesta Carter | Jamaica | 10.95 | |
| | 5 | Usain Bolt | Jamaica | DQ | R 162.7 |
