= 2011 World Championships in Athletics – Women's 200 metres =

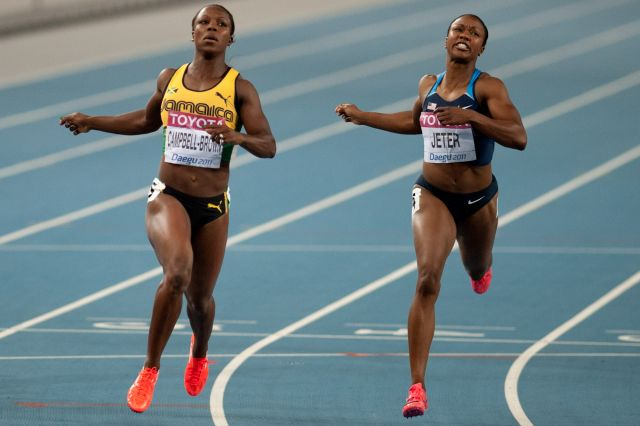
The finish of the women's 200 metre race at Daegu, Veronica Campbell-Brown ahead of Carmelita Jeter.

Official Video

The Women's 200 metres at the 2011 World Championships in Athletics was held at the Daegu Stadium on September 1 and 2.

The defending three-time world champion Allyson Felix and reigning two time Olympic champion Veronica Campbell-Brown were the principal contenders, although both were aiming for sprint doubles of 200/400 m and 100/200 m, respectively. Shalonda Solomon was the world-leader before the championships with her run of 22.15 seconds which made her the 2011 US champion. Other contenders included Carmelita Jeter, who was second in the rankings, and Jeneba Tarmoh (the fourth American runner) who was ranked fifth.

The results of the three semifinals placed three Jamaicans and three Southern California athletes as the automatic qualifiers. Debbie Ferguson-McKenzie and Hrystyna Stuy were the time qualifiers.

In the final, Campbell-Brown burst out of the blocks, making up the stagger on Solomon to her outside. In the home stretch, Campbell-Brown and Jeter separated from the rest of the field, until Campbell-Brown pulled ahead for a clear victory. Defending champion Felix, who looked sluggish throughout the season, closed fast to challenge Jeter near the line.

== Medalists ==
Gold	Silver	Bronze
Veronica Campbell-Brown; Jamaica	Carmelita Jeter; United States	Allyson Felix; United States

== Records ==
Prior to the competition, the records were as follows:

World record	Florence Griffith-Joyner (USA)	21.34	Seoul, South Korea	29 September 1988
Championship record	Silke Gladisch-Möller (GDR)	21.74	Rome, Italy	3 September 1987
World Leading	Shalonda Solomon (USA)	22.15	Eugene, OR, United States	26 June 2011
African record	Mary Onyali-Omagbemi (NGR)	22.07	Zürich, Switzerland	14 August 1996
Asian record	Li Xuemei (CHN)	22.01	Shanghai, China	22 October 1997
North, Central American and Caribbean record	Florence Griffith-Joyner (USA)	21.34	Seoul, South Korea	29 September 1988
South American record	Ana Claudia Silva (BRA)	22.48	São Paulo, Brazil	6 August 2011
European record	Marita Koch (GDR)	21.71	Karl-Marx-Stadt, East Germany	10 June 1979
European record	Marita Koch (GDR)	21.71	Potsdam, East Germany	21 July 1984
European record	Heike Drechsler (GDR)	21.71	Jena, East Germany	29 June 1986
European record	Heike Drechsler (GDR)	21.71	Stuttgart, West Germany	29 August 1986
Oceanian record	Melinda Gainsford-Taylor (AUS)	22.23	Stuttgart, Germany	13 July 1997

== Qualification standards ==
A time	B time
11.29	11.38

== Schedule ==
Date	Time	Round
September 1, 2011	10:50	Heats
September 1, 2011	19:25	Semifinals
September 2, 2011	20:55	Final

== Results ==
KEY:	q	Fastest non-qualifiers	Q	Qualified	NR	National record	PB	Personal best	SB	Seasonal best

=== Heats ===
Qualification: First 4 in each heat (Q) and the next 4 fastest (q) advance to the semifinals.

Wind:
Heat 1: -0.1 m/s, Heat 2: -0.5 m/s, Heat 3: -0.3 m/s, Heat 4: +0.3 m/s, Heat 5: -0.2 m/s

Rank	Heat	Name	Nationality	Time	Notes
1	5	Veronica Campbell-Brown	Jamaica	22.46	Q
2	5	Ivet Lalova	Bulgaria	22.62	Q, SB
3	2	Carmelita Jeter	United States	22.68	Q
4	3	Dafne Schippers	Netherlands	22.69	Q, NR
4	4	Shalonda Solomon	United States	22.69	Q
6	1	Myriam Soumaré	France	22.71	Q, SB
6	3	Allyson Felix	United States	22.71	Q
8	4	Mariya Ryemyen	Ukraine	22.77	Q
9	1	Kerron Stewart	Jamaica	22.83	Q
10	5	Debbie Ferguson-McKenzie	Bahamas	22.86	Q
11	1	Yuliya Gushchina	Russia	22.88	Q, SB
12	4	Kai Selvon	Trinidad and Tobago	22.89	Q, PB
13	5	Hrystyna Stuy	Ukraine	22.92	Q, PB
14	5	Anyika Onuora	Great Britain & N.I.	22.93	q, PB
15	2	Sherone Simpson	Jamaica	22.94	Q
16	3	Ana Cláudia Lemos Silva	Brazil	22.96	Q
17	1	Nivea Smith	Bahamas	23.09	Q
17	2	Elizabeta Savlinis	Russia	23.09	Q
19	3	Janelle Redhead	Grenada	23.11	Q
20	3	Allison Peter	U.S. Virgin Islands	23.17	q
21	4	Anthonique Strachan	Bahamas	23.20	Q
22	4	Nelkis Casabona	Cuba	23.21	q
23	1	Chisato Fukushima	Japan	23.25	q
24	5	Moa Hjelmer	Sweden	23.31	
25	4	Anna Kiełbasińska	Poland	23.34	
26	3	Endurance Abinuwa	Nigeria	23.53	
27	1	Jeneba Tarmoh	United States	23.60	
28	2	Yelizaveta Bryzhina	Ukraine	23.70	Q
28	2	Vanda Gomes	Brazil	23.70	
30	4	Kimberly Hyacinthe	Canada	23.83	
31	2	Viktoriya Zyabkina	Kazakhstan	24.09	
32	3	Phumlile Ndzinisa	Swaziland	24.15	NR
33	5	Maryam Tousi	Iran	24.17	
34	4	Hinikissia Albertine Ndikert	Chad	24.81	PB
35	2	Mary Jane Vincent	Mauritius	25.20	SB
36	5	Fanny Shonobi	Gambia	25.55	SB
37	1	Chan Seyha	Cambodia	26.34	PB
38	3	Afa Ismail	Maldives	26.48	
	1	Ramona van der Vloot	Suriname	DNS	
	2	Blessing Okagbare	Nigeria	DNS	

=== Semifinals ===
Qualification: First 2 in each heat (Q) and the next 2 fastest (q) advance to the final.

Wind:
Heat 1: -0.7 m/s, Heat 2: -0.1 m/s, Heat 3: -1.8 m/s

Rank	Heat	Name	Nationality	Time	Notes
1	2	Shalonda Solomon	United States	22.46	Q
2	1	Carmelita Jeter	United States	22.47	Q
3	3	Veronica Campbell-Brown	Jamaica	22.53	Q
4	3	Allyson Felix	United States	22.67	Q
5	2	Kerron Stewart	Jamaica	22.77	Q
6	2	Hrystyna Stuy	Ukraine	22.79	q, PB
7	2	Debbie Ferguson-McKenzie	Bahamas	22.85	q
8	1	Sherone Simpson	Jamaica	22.88	Q
9	2	Dafne Schippers	Netherlands	22.92	
10	1	Mariya Ryemyen	Ukraine	22.94	
11	1	Ana Cláudia Lemos Silva	Brazil	22.97	
12	1	Myriam Soumaré	France	23.02	
13	3	Ivet Lalova	Bulgaria	23.03	
14	2	Elizabeta Savlinis	Russia	23.04	
15	1	Nivea Smith	Bahamas	23.06	
16	2	Anyika Onuora	Great Britain & N.I.	23.08	
17	2	Kai Selvon	Trinidad and Tobago	23.11	
18	3	Yuliya Gushchina	Russia	23.26	
19	1	Nelkis Casabona	Cuba	23.32	
20	1	Chisato Fukushima	Japan	23.52	
21	2	Allison Peter	U.S. Virgin Islands	23.56	
22	3	Janelle Redhead	Grenada	23.57	
23	3	Anthonique Strachan	Bahamas	23.85	
	3	Yelizaveta Bryzhina	Ukraine	DNF	

=== Final ===
Wind: -1.0 m/s

Rank	Lane	Name	Nationality	Time	Notes
1st place, gold medalist(s)	5	Veronica Campbell-Brown	Jamaica	22.22	SB
2nd place, silver medalist(s)	4	Carmelita Jeter	United States	22.37	
3rd place, bronze medalist(s)	3	Allyson Felix	United States	22.42	
4	6	Shalonda Solomon	United States	22.61	
5	8	Kerron Stewart	Jamaica	22.70	
6	1	Debbie Ferguson-McKenzie	Bahamas	22.96	
7	2	Hrystyna Stuy	Ukraine	23.02	
8	7	Sherone Simpson	Jamaica	23.17	
