= 2011 World Championships in Athletics – Women's 4 × 100 metres relay =

Official Video

The Women's 4 × 100 metres relay event at the 2011 World Championships in Athletics was held at the Daegu Stadium on 4 September.

Runners from the United States had provided the fastest times before the competition, but bad baton exchanges had seen their teams disqualified at both the 2008 Olympics and the 2009 World Championships. The Americans and Jamaica, the defending world relay champions, were seen as the primary contenders for the title. Ukraine and Russia (the Olympic title holder) were the next fastest entrants into the championships.

The first semi-final was won by a ragged looking Jamaican team. France followed Jamaica into the final. In third place, Brazil set the South American record and qualified for the final by time. China false started out of the event. The second semi-final was won by Trinidad and Tobago, setting their national record, with Ukraine following them into the final. Russia also qualified on time. In the third semi-final, the USA, running in lane 2 ran the world leader to qualify, along with Nigeria. In lane 3, Bahamas' Anthonique Strachan fell as the modern version of the golden girls tried to qualify. Bahamas eventually finished while Germany was unable to complete their first handoff.

In the final, Shelly-Ann Fraser-Pryce put Jamaica into the lead, but strong legs from Allyson Felix and Marshevet Myers brought the United States back into contention. Despite their recent history of poor handoffs, the United States executed their final baton exchange perfectly, gaining a couple of metres on Jamaica. Given the lead, Carmelita Jeter was able to hold off a closing Veronica Campbell-Brown for the win. Jamaica set their national record in second. Ukraine's Hrystyna Stuy in lane 8 ran down France and Trinidad and Tobago to finish a distant third.

== Medalists ==
Gold	Silver	Bronze
United States; Bianca Knight; Allyson Felix; Marshevet Myers; Carmelita Jeter; Shalonda Solomon*; Alexandria Anderson*	Jamaica; Shelly-Ann Fraser-Pryce; Kerron Stewart; Sherone Simpson; Veronica Campbell-Brown; Jura Levy*	Ukraine; Olesya Povh; Nataliya Pohrebnyak; Mariya Ryemyen; Hrystyna Stuy

== Records ==
World record	East Germany (Silke Gladisch-Möller, Sabine Rieger, Ingrid Auerswald-Lange, Marlies Göhr)	41.37	Canberra, Australia	6 October 1985
Championship record	United States (Chryste Gaines, Marion Jones, Inger Miller, Gail Devers)	41.47	Athens, Greece	9 August 1997
World leading	United States Red (Lauryn Williams, Allyson Felix, Marshevet Myers, Carmelita Jeter)	42.28	Philadelphia, PA, United States	5 August 2011
African record	Nigeria (Beatrice Utondu, Faith Idehen, Christy Opara-Thompson, Mary Onyali-Omagbemi)	42.39	Barcelona, Spain	7 August 1992
Asian record	China (Lin Xiao, Yali Li, Xiaomei Liu, Li Xuemei)	42.23	Shanghai, China	23 October 1997
North, Central American and Caribbean record	United States (Chryste Gaines, Marion Jones, Inger Miller, Gail Devers)	41.47	Athens, Greece	9 August 1997
South American record	Brazil (Lucimar Aparecida de Moura, Katia Regina Santos, Luciana dos Santos, Rosemar Maria Neto)	42.97	Bogotá, Colombia	10 July 2004
European record	East Germany (Silke Gladisch-Möller, Sabine Rieger, Ingrid Auerswald-Lange, Marlies Göhr)	41.37	Canberra, Australia	6 October 1985
Oceanian record	Australia (Rachael Massey, Suzanne Broadrick, Jodi Lambert, Melinda Gainsford-Taylor)	42.99	Pietersburg, South Africa	18 March 2000

== Qualification standards ==
A time	B time
44.00

== Schedule ==
Date	Time	Round
4 September 2011	18:30	Heats
4 September 2011	20:35	Final

== Results ==
KEY:	q	Fastest non-qualifiers	Q	Qualified	NR	National record	PB	Personal best	SB	Seasonal best

=== Heats ===
Qualification: First 2 of each heat (Q) plus the 2 fastest times (q) advance to the final.

Rank	Heat	Nation	Athletes	Time	Notes
1	3	United States	Bianca Knight, Shalonda Solomon, Marshevet Myers, Alexandria Anderson	41.94	Q, WL
2	1	Jamaica	Shelly-Ann Fraser-Pryce, Kerron Stewart, Sherone Simpson, Jura Levy	42.23	Q, SB
3	1	France	Myriam Soumaré, Céline Distel, Lina Jacques-Sébastien, Véronique Mang	42.60	Q, SB
4	2	Ukraine	Olesya Povh, Nataliya Pohrebnyak, Mariya Ryemyen, Hrystyna Stuy	42.63	Q, SB
5	3	Nigeria	Gloria Asumnu, Oludamola Osayomi, Agnes Osazuwa, Blessing Okagbare	42.74	Q, SB
6	2	Russia	Yuliya Gushchina, Natalia Rusakova, Elizabeta Savlinis, Aleksandra Fedoriva	42.78	q, SB
7	1	Brazil	Ana Cláudia Lemos Silva, Vanda Gomes, Franciela Krasucki, Rosângela Santos	42.92	q, AR
8	3	Netherlands	Kadene Vassell, Dafne Schippers, Anouk Hagen, Jamile Samuel	43.44	NR
9	1	Colombia	Yomara Hinestroza, Maria Alejandra Idrobo, Darlenys Obregón, Norma González	43.53	SB
10	2	Australia	Hayley Butler, Melissa Breen, Charlotte van Veenendaal, Sally Pearson	43.79	
11	1	Japan	Nao Okabe, Momoko Takahashi, Chisato Fukushima, Saori Imai	43.83	
12	2	Great Britain & N.I.	Tiffany Porter, Anyika Onuora, Laura Turner, Jeanette Kwakye	43.95	
13	3	Switzerland	Clélia Reuse, Jacqueline Gasser, Ellen Sprunger, Léa Sprunger	44.04	
14	3	Belarus	Anna Bagdanovich, Yuliya Balykina, Alena Neumiarzhitskaya, Hanna Liapeshka	44.38	
15	2	South Korea	Eum Jeesu, Kim So-yeon, Lee Sunae, Park So-Yeun	46.14	SB
16	1	Spain	Plácida Martínez, Amparo Cotán, Concepción Montaner, Ruth Beitia	46.24	
17	3	Bahamas	Sheniqua Ferguson, Nivea Smith, Anthonique Strachan, Debbie Ferguson-McKenzie	50.62	
	3	Germany	Yasmin Kwadwo, Anne Möllinger, Cathleen Tschirch, Marion Wagner	DNF	
	2	Poland	Anna Kiełbasińska, Marika Popowicz, Marta Jeschke, Agnieszka Ligięza	DNF	
	1	China	Wei Yongli, Liang Qiuping, Jiang Lan, Tao Yujia	DSQ	FS
	2	Trinidad and Tobago	Kai Selvon, Kelly-Ann Baptiste, Semoy Hackett, Michelle-Lee Ahye	DQ	Semoy Hackett's Drug Test

=== Final ===
Rank	Lane	Nation	Athletes	Time	Notes
1st place, gold medalist(s)	4	United States	Bianca Knight, Allyson Felix, Marshevet Myers, Carmelita Jeter	41.56	WL
2nd place, silver medalist(s)	6	Jamaica	Shelly-Ann Fraser-Pryce, Kerron Stewart, Sherone Simpson, Veronica Campbell-Brown	41.70	NR
3rd place, bronze medalist(s)	8	Ukraine	Olesya Povh, Nataliya Pohrebnyak, Mariya Ryemyen, Hrystyna Stuy	42.51	SB
4	5	France	Myriam Soumaré, Céline Distel, Lina Jacques-Sébastien, Véronique Mang	42.70	
5	1	Russia	Yuliya Gushchina, Natalia Rusakova, Elizabeta Savlinis, Aleksandra Fedoriva	42.93	
6	7	Nigeria	Gloria Asumnu, Oludamola Osayomi, Agnes Osazuwa, Blessing Okagbare	42.93	
7	2	Brazil	Ana Cláudia Lemos Silva, Vanda Gomes, Franciela Krasucki, Rosângela Santos	43.10	
	3	Trinidad and Tobago	Kai Selvon, Kelly-Ann Baptiste, Semoy Hackett, Michelle-Lee Ahye	(42.58)	Semoy Hackett's Drug Test
