= Great Britain and Northern Ireland at the 2011 World Championships in Athletics =

- WA code: GBR
- National federation: UK Athletics
- Website: www.uka.org.uk

in Daegu
- Competitors: 59
- Medals Ranked 6th: Gold 3 Silver 3 Bronze 1 Total 7

World Championships in Athletics appearances (overview)
- 1976; 1980; 1983; 1987; 1991; 1993; 1995; 1997; 1999; 2001; 2003; 2005; 2007; 2009; 2011; 2013; 2015; 2017; 2019; 2022; 2023; 2025

The United Kingdom of Great Britain and Northern Ireland (often referred to as Great Britain) competed at the 2011 World Championships in Athletics from 27 August - 4 September 2011.

== Team selection ==
UK Athletics announced a team of 67 athletes on August 9 in preparation for the competition. Team GB was represented by defending world champions Phillips Idowu and Jessica Ennis in the triple jump and the heptathlon respectively, as well as Lisa Dobriskey and Jenny Meadows who won silver and bronze medals at the 2009 World Championships respectively. Selected athletes had achieved at least one of the competition's A or B qualifying standards.

Head coach Charles van Commenne had expressed a target of 10 medal opportunities ahead of the 2012 Summer Olympics in London. Apart from the defending medallists, the team also includes the women's 400m gold and silver medallists from the 2007 World Championships, Christine Ohuruogu and Nicola Sanders, respectively and two individual medallists from the 1999 World Championships, 100m bronze medallist Dwain Chambers and women's triple jump silver medallist Yamila Aldama.

In addition, the team included 2 athletes invited by the IPC for exhibition events: Michael Bushell, 400m T53 (wheelchair) men, and Rochelle Woods, 800m T54 (wheelchair) women.

The following athletes appeared on the preliminary entry list, but not on the official start list of the specific event, resulting in total number of 59 competitors:

Key:	Did not participate	Competed in another event

	Event	Athlete
Men	4 x 100 metres relay	Mark Lewis-Francis
Men	4 x 100 metres relay	Daniel Talbot
Men	4 x 400 metres relay	Richard Buck
Men	4 x 400 metres relay	Luke Lennon-Ford
Women	4 x 100 metres relay	Montell Douglas
Women	4 x 100 metres relay	Abiodun Oyepitan
Women	4 x 100 metres relay	Asha Philip
Women	4 x 400 metres relay	Eilidh Child
Women	4 x 400 metres relay	Nadine Okyere

== Medallists ==
The following British competitors won medals at the Championships

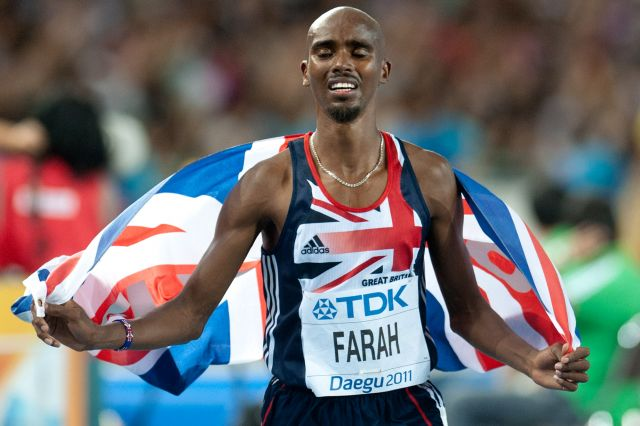
Mo Farah won both the gold medal in the 5000 metres event and a silver medal in the 10,000 metres event at this year's championships

Medal	Name	Event	Date
Gold	Jessica Ennis	Heptathlon	30 August
Gold	Dai Greene	400 metres hurdles	1 September
Gold	Mo Farah	5000 metres	4 September
Silver	Mo Farah	10 000 metres	28 August
Silver	Hannah England	1500 metres	1 September
Silver	Phillips Idowu	Triple jump	4 September
Bronze	Andy Turner	110 metres hurdles	29 August

== Results ==
=== Men ===
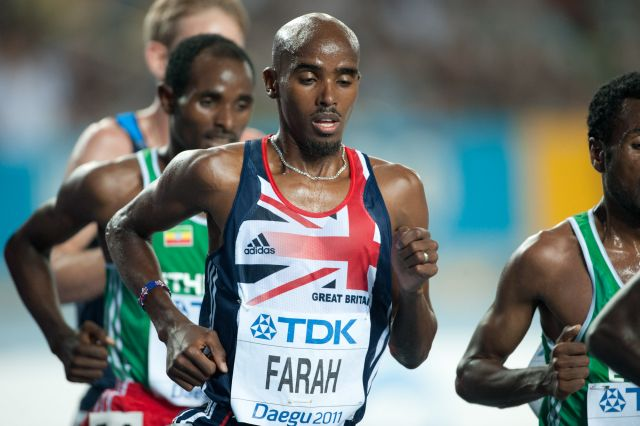
Mo Farah was the most successful British athlete in Daegu with a gold and a silver medal.

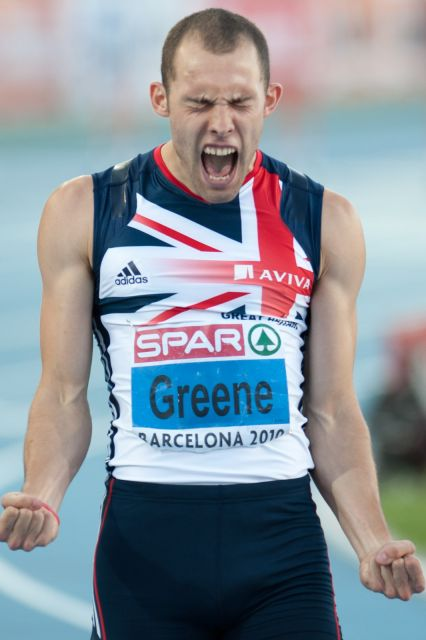
Dai Greene won the men's 400 metre hurdles

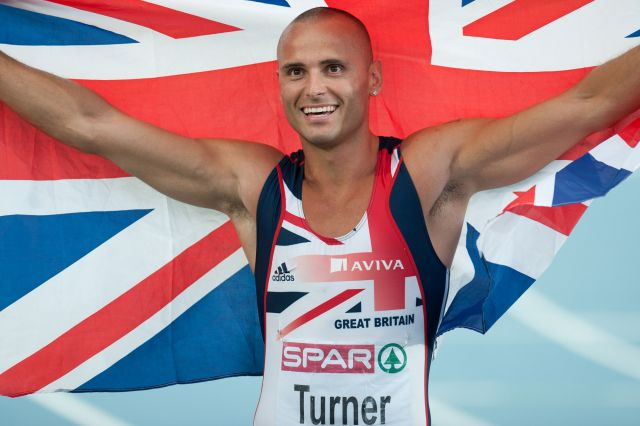
Andy Turner won bronze in the high hurdles

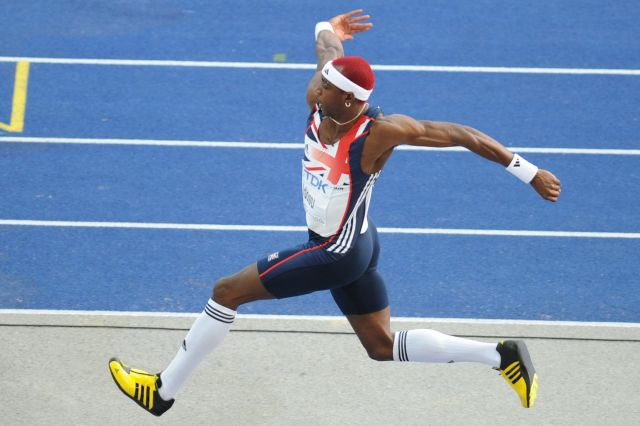
Phillips Idowu, silver medal winner in the triple jump

Athlete	Event	Preliminaries		Heats		Semifinals		Final	
Athlete	Event	Time Width Height	Rank	Time Width Height	Rank	Time Width Height	Rank	Time Width Height	Rank
Harry Aikines-Aryeetey	100 metres			10.29	2 Q	10.23	3	Did not advance	
Dwain Chambers	100 metres			10.34	4 q	DQ		Did not advance	
Marlon Devonish	100 metres			10.28	2 Q	10.25	7	Did not advance	
James Ellington	200 metres			20.82	4	Did not advance			
Christian Malcolm	200 metres			20.66	4 q	20.88	5	Did not advance	
Martyn Rooney	400 metres			45.30 (SB)	2 Q	46.09	7	Did not advance	
Andrew Osagie	800 metres			1:46.08	2 Q	1:46.12	4	Did not advance	
Michael Rimmer	800 metres			1.47:11	5	Did not advance			
James Shane	1500 metres			3:41.17	19	Did not advance			
Mo Farah	5000 metres			13:38.03	2 Q			13:23.36	Gold medal
Mo Farah	10,000 metres							27:14.07	Silver medal
Andrew Lemoncello	Marathon							DNS	
Lee Merrien	Marathon							2:16:59	22
Dave Webb	Marathon							2:15:48 (SB)	15
Lawrence Clarke	110 m hurdles			13.65	5	Did not advance			
Andy Turner	110 m hurdles			13.32	2 Q	13.44	4 q	13.44	Bronze medal
William Sharman	110 m hurdles			13.52	4 q	13.51	3 Q	13.67	5
Dai Greene	400 m hurdles			48.52	1 Q	48.62	1 Q	48.26	Gold medal
Jack Green	400 m hurdles			50.39	4 Q	49.62	5	Did not advance	
Nathan Woodward	400 m hurdles			49.06	2 Q	49.57	6	Did not advance	
Harry Aikines-Aryeetey; Marlon Devonish; Christian Malcolm; Craig Pickering	4 x 100 metres relay			38.29	1 Q			DNF	
Richard Strachan; Nigel Levine; Chris Clarke; Martyn Rooney	4 x 400 metres relay			3:00.38 (SB)	4 q			3:01.16	7
Greg Rutherford	Long jump	8.00	7					Did not advance	
Chris Tomlinson	Long jump	8.02	7 q					7.87	11
Phillips Idowu	Triple jump	17.17	2 Q					17.77 (SB)	Silver medal
Martyn Bernard	High jump	2.21	29					Did not advance	
Tom Parsons	High jump	2.25	19					Did not advance	
Steve Lewis	Pole vault	5.50	6 q					5.65 (SB)	9
Abdul Buhari	Discus throw	60.21	13					Did not advance	
Brett Morse	Discus throw	62.38	5 q					62.69	12
Carl Myerscough	Discus throw	60.29	17					Did not advance	

=== Women ===
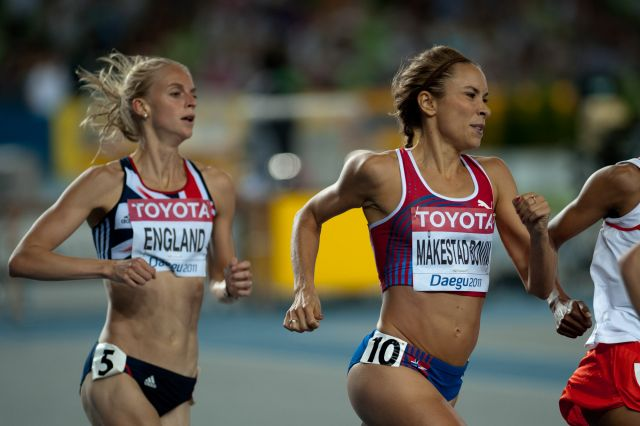
Hannah England (left) was an unexpected silver medalist in the 1500 metres

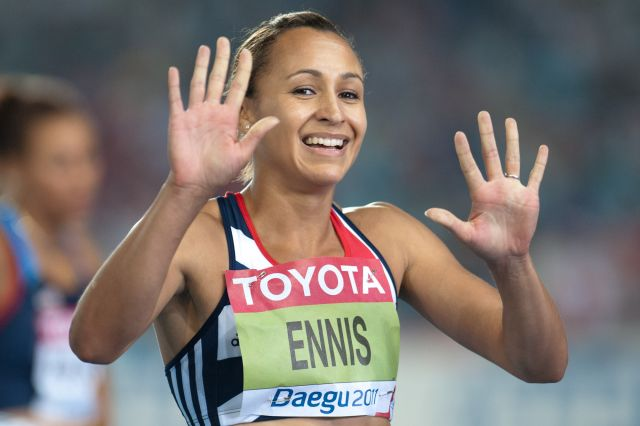
Jessica Ennis won in the heptathlon; her award and ceremony were presented at the 2017 World Championships following doping-related disqualifications.

Athlete	Event	Preliminaries		Heats		Semifinals		Final	
Athlete	Event	Time Width Height	Rank	Time Width Height	Rank	Time Width Height	Rank	Time Width Height	Rank
Jeanette Kwakye	100 metres	BYE		11.42	3 Q	11.48	6	Did not advance	
Anyika Onuora	100 metres	BYE		11.41	5	Did not advance			
Laura Turner	100 metres	BYE		11.45	4	Did not advance			
Anyika Onuora	200 metres			22.93 (PB)	5 q	23.08	7	Did not advance	
Lee McConnell	400 metres			52.75	3 Q	51.97	7	Did not advance	
Christine Ohuruogu	400 metres			DQ		Did not advance			
Nicola Sanders	400 metres			52.65	5 q	52.47	6	Did not advance	
Emma Jackson	800 metres			2:01.17	5 q	1:59.77 (PB)	5	Did not advance	
Jenny Meadows	800 metres			2:01.11	1 Q	1:59.07	3	Did not advance	
Marilyn Okoro	800 metres			1:59.74	4 Q	2:01.54	7	Did not advance	
Lisa Dobriskey	1500 metres			4:12.70	11	Did not advance			
Hannah England	1500 metres			4:13.45	1 Q	4:08.31	6 q	4:05.68	Silver medal
Helen Clitheroe	5000 metres			5:37.73	8 q			15:21.22	12
Alyson Dixon	Marathon							2:50:51	42
Susan Partridge	Marathon							2:35:57	24
Tiffany Porter	100 m hurdles			12.84	1 Q	12.56 (NR)	1 Q	12.63	4
Eilidh Child	400 m hurdles			56.18	3 Q	55.89	6	Did not advance	
Perri Shakes-Drayton	400 m hurdles			55.90	2 Q	55.07	3	Did not advance	
Barbara Parker	3000 metres steeplechase			9:38.21	5 q			9:56.66	14
Jeanette Kwakye; Anyika Onuora; Tiffany Porter; Laura Turner	4 x 100 metres relay			43.95	5			Did not advance	
Christine Ohuruogu; Nicola Sanders; Lee McConnell; Perri Shakes-Drayton	4 x 400 metres relay			3:23.05 (SB)	2 Q			3:23.63	4
Johanna Jackson	20 kilometres walk							1:35:32	23
Shara Proctor	Long jump	6.34	11					Did not advance	
Yamilé Aldama	Triple jump	14.35 (SB)	2 q					14.50 (SB)	5
Holly Bleasdale	Pole vault	NM						Did not advance	
Kate Dennison	Pole vault	4.50m	8					Did not advance	
Sophie Hitchon	Hammer throw	64.93	13					Did not advance	
Goldie Sayers	Javelin throw	62.19	4 Q					58.18	10

Heptathlon

Jessica Ennis	Heptathlon			
Jessica Ennis	Event	Results	Points	Rank
	100 m hurdles	12.93	1133	2
	High jump	1.86	1054	3
	Shot put	14.67 (PB)	839	7
	200 m	23.27	1052	1
	Long jump	6.51	1010	2
	Javelin throw	39.95	666	21
	800 m	2:07.81	997	2
Total			6751	Gold medal

Louise Hazel	Heptathlon			
Louise Hazel	Event	Results	Points	Rank
	100 m hurdles	13.24 (PB)	1089	4
	High jump	1.74 (PB)	903	6
	Shot put	12.36 (SB)	685	8
	200 m	24.25	957	1
	Long jump	6.25	927	10
	Javelin throw	41.75	701	17
	800 m	2:15.44	887	16
Total			6149	14
