= 2011 World Championships in Athletics – Women's 100 metres =

Women's 100 metres at the 2011 World Championships
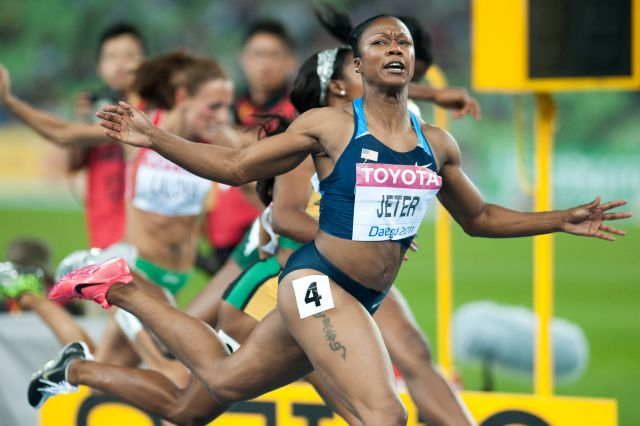
- Carmelita Jeter winning the 100m. In the background Shelly-Ann Fraser-Pryce (4th) and Ivet Lalova (7th).
- Venue: Daegu Stadium
- Dates: 28 August (heats); 29 August (finals)
- Competitors: 55 from 40 nations
- Winning time: 10.90

Medalists
gold medal	Carmelita Jeter; United States
silver medal	Veronica Campbell-Brown; Jamaica
bronze medal	Kelly-Ann Baptiste; Trinidad and Tobago

Official Video

The Women's 100 metres at the 2011 World Championships in Athletics was held at the Daegu Stadium on August 27, 28 and 29.

Prior to the championships, American Carmelita Jeter held the fastest time of the year (10.70 seconds) and the 2009 bronze medalist entered the competition as the second fastest woman of all time. Veronica Campbell-Brown, the 2007 champion, was the next fastest athlete (10.76) and the only woman to have beaten Jeter that year. The reigning world and Olympic champion, Shelly-Ann Fraser-Pryce was also in contention, although her preparations were affected by injury. Marshevet Myers, Kerron Stewart, and Kelly-Ann Baptiste were ranked in the top five for the 100 m before the race.

In the final, Jeter got out of the blocks with Fraser-Pryce, who is known for her fast starts. The two were even through the first half of the race until Jeter pulled away for a clear win. Fast closing Campbell-Brown and Baptiste edged past Fraser-Pryce at the finish.

== Medalists ==
Gold	Silver	Bronze
Carmelita Jeter; United States	Veronica Campbell-Brown; Jamaica	Kelly-Ann Baptiste; Trinidad and Tobago

== Records ==
Prior to the competition, the records were as follows:

World record	Florence Griffith-Joyner (USA)	10.49	Indianapolis, IN, United States	16 July 1988
Championship record	Marion Jones (USA)	10.70	Seville, Spain	28 August 1999
World Leading	Carmelita Jeter (USA)	10.70	Eugene, OR, United States	4 June 2011
African Record	Glory Alozie (NGR)	10.90	La Laguna, Spain	5 June 1999
Asian Record	Li Xuemei (CHN)	10.79	Shanghai, China	18 October 1997
North, Central American and Caribbean record	Florence Griffith-Joyner (USA)	10.49	Indianapolis, IN, United States	16 July 1988
South American record	Ana Claudia Silva (BRA)	11.15	São Paulo, Brazil	4 September 2010
European Record	Christine Arron (FRA)	10.73	Budapest, Hungary	19 August 1998
Oceanian record	Melinda Gainsford-Taylor (AUS)	11.12	Sestriere, Italy	31 July 1994

== Qualification standards ==
A time	B time
11.29	11.38

== Schedule ==
Date	Time	Round
August 27, 2011	11:30	Preliminary round
August 28, 2011	12:10	Heats
August 29, 2011	19:30	Semifinals
August 29, 2011	21:45	Final

== Results ==
KEY:	q	Fastest non-qualifiers	Q	Qualified	NR	National record	PB	Personal best	SB	Seasonal best

=== Preliminary round ===
Qualification: First 3 in each heat (Q) and the next 4 fastest (q) advance to the heats.

Wind:
Heat 1: -0.1 m/s, Heat 2: -0.5 m/s, Heat 3: +1.8 m/s, Heat 4: +1.8 m/s, Heat 5: -1.3 m/s

Rank	Heat	Name	Nationality	Time	Notes
1	2	Delphine Atangana	Cameroon	11.57	Q
2	3	Phobay Kutu-Akoi	Liberia	11.62	Q
3	4	Jung Hye-Lim	South Korea	11.90	Q
4	4	Liao Ching-Hsien	Chinese Taipei	11.98	Q
5	5	Norjannah Hafiszah Jamaludin	Malaysia	12.06	Q
6	1	Kaina Martinez	Belize	12.14	Q, PB
7	3	Vladislava Ovcharenko	Tajikistan	12.26	Q
8	2	Ahamada Feta	Comoros	12.27	Q, SB
9	1	Joanne Pricilla Loutoy	Seychelles	12.29	Q, PB
9	2	Diane Borg	Malta	12.29	Q
11	5	Aneterica Quive	Mozambique	12.31	Q
12	3	Patricia Taea	Cook Islands	12.44	Q, NR
13	5	Martina Pretelli	San Marino	12.47	Q
14	5	Ivana Rožman	Macedonia	12.48	q
15	2	Gloria Diogo	São Tomé and Príncipe	12.52	q, SB
16	2	Djénébou Danté	Mali	12.62	q, SB
17	1	Lovelite Detenamo	Nauru	12.63	Q, PB
18	3	Pollara Cobb	Guam	12.64	q
19	3	Nafissa Souleymane	Niger	12.74	PB
20	5	Yvonne Bennett	Northern Mariana Islands	12.78	
21	4	Alda Paulo	Angola	12.85	Q, PB
22	1	Shinelle Proctor	Anguilla	12.89	PB
23	4	Maguy Safi Makanda	DR Congo	13.05	PB
24	3	Joycelyn Taurikeni	Solomon Islands	13.16	PB
25	1	Chandra Kala Thapa	Nepal	13.17	SB
26	5	Susan Tama	Vanuatu	13.29	PB
27	2	Maysa Rejepova	Turkmenistan	13.43	PB
28	3	Rubie Joy Gabriel	Palau	13.48	PB
29	1	Boudsadee Vongdala	Laos	13.56	SB
30	1	Kabotaake Romeri	Kiribati	13.71	PB
31	5	Belinda Talakai	Tonga	13.73	
32	4	Asenate Manoa	Tuvalu	13.92	
33	4	Megan West	American Samoa	13.95	PB
34	4	Bounkou Camara	Mauritania	14.05	SB
35	2	Mihter Wendolin	Micronesia	14.69	
	1	Youlia Camara	Guinea	DSQ	

=== Heats ===
Qualification: First 3 in each heat (Q) and the next 3 fastest (q) advance to the semifinals.

Wind:
Heat 1: +0.3 m/s, Heat 2: +1.4 m/s, Heat 3: +1.0 m/s, Heat 4: +0.1 m/s, Heat 5: +0.9 m/s, Heat 6: +2.2 m/s, Heat 7: +0.5 m/s

Rank	Heat	Name	Nationality	Time	Notes
1	3	Ivet Lalova	Bulgaria	11.09	Q
1	5	Blessing Okagbare	Nigeria	11.09	Q
3	6	Myriam Soumaré	France	11.11	PB, Q
4	2	Kerron Stewart	Jamaica	11.12	Q
4	5	Shelly-Ann Fraser-Pryce	Jamaica	11.12	Q
6	3	Oludamola Osayomi	Nigeria	11.14	Q
7	6	Marshevet Myers	United States	11.15	Q
8	7	Veronica Campbell-Brown	Jamaica	11.18	Q
9	2	Ruddy Zang Milama	Gabon	11.19	Q
9	7	Véronique Mang	France	11.19	Q
9	3	Michelle-Lee Ahye	Trinidad and Tobago	11.20	Q, PB
12	1	Carmelita Jeter	United States	11.20	Q
12	2	Ezinne Okparaebo	Norway	11.20	Q, NR
14	6	Olesya Povh	Ukraine	11.25	Q
15	4	Kelly-Ann Baptiste	Trinidad and Tobago	11.26	Q
15	5	Ana Cláudia Lemos Silva	Brazil	11.26	Q
15	2	Semoy Hackett	Trinidad and Tobago	11.26	q
18	7	Aleksandra Fedoriva	Russia	11.27	Q, PB
19	7	Yasmin Kwadwo	Germany	11.28	q, PB
20	6	Jura Levy	Jamaica	11.33	q
20	7	Nataliya Pohrebnyak	Ukraine	11.33	
22	4	Chisato Fukushima	Japan	11.34	Q
23	1	Sheniqua Ferguson	Bahamas	11.35	Q
23	5	Inna Eftimova	Bulgaria	11.35	
23	6	Leena Günther	Germany	11.35	
26	4	Rosângela Santos	Brazil	11.36	Q
27	4	Mikele Barber	United States	11.39	
28	4	Anyika Onuora	Great Britain & N.I.	11.40	
29	1	Jeanette Kwakye	Great Britain & N.I.	11.41	Q
30	3	Laura Turner	Great Britain & N.I.	11.44	
31	3	Guzel Khubbieva	Uzbekistan	11.45	
32	1	Nelkis Casabona	Cuba	11.45	
32	2	Andreea Ograzeanu	Romania	11.46	
34	4	Delphine Atangana	Cameroon	11.55	
35	3	Yomara Hinestroza	Colombia	11.56	
36	2	Phobay Kutu-Akoi	Liberia	11.60	
37	5	Olga Bludova	Kazakhstan	11.62	
38	1	Marta Jeschke	Poland	11.72	
39	7	Norjannah Hafiszah Jamaludin	Malaysia	11.73	
40	6	Jung Hye-Lim	South Korea	11.87	
41	1	Liao Ching-Hsien	Chinese Taipei	12.15	
42	1	Kaina Martinez	Belize	12.17	
43	5	Diane Borg	Malta	12.21	
43	6	Ahamada Feta	Comoros	12.21	
45	7	Vladislava Ovcharenko	Tajikistan	12.23	
46	3	Martina Pretelli	San Marino	12.27	
47	7	Djénébou Danté	Mali	12.31	PB
48	2	Joanne Pricilla Loutoy	Seychelles	12.34	
49	4	Aneterica Quive	Mozambique	12.39	
50	2	Ivana Rožman	Macedonia	12.42	
51	6	Gloria Diogo	São Tomé and Príncipe	12.45	
52	5	Lovelite Detenamo	Nauru	12.50	NR
53	1	Pollara Cobb	Guam	12.55	NR
54	3	Patricia Taea	Cook Islands	12.62	
55	4	Alda Paulo	Angola	13.01	
	5	Natasha Mayers	Saint Vincent and the Grenadines	DNS	

=== Semifinals ===
Qualification: First 2 in each heat (Q) and the next 2 fastest (q) advance to the final.

Wind:
Heat 1: -1.3 m/s, Heat 2: -1.4 m/s, Heat 3: -1.5 m/s

Rank	Heat	Name	Nationality	Time	Notes
1	3	Carmelita Jeter	United States	11.02	Q
2	2	Shelly-Ann Fraser-Pryce	Jamaica	11.03	Q
3	3	Kelly-Ann Baptiste	Trinidad and Tobago	11.05	Q
4	2	Veronica Campbell-Brown	Jamaica	11.06	Q
5	2	Blessing Okagbare	Nigeria	11.22	q
6	3	Ivet Lalova	Bulgaria	11.23	q
7	1	Kerron Stewart	Jamaica	11.26	Q
8	2	Semoy Hackett	Trinidad and Tobago	11.35	
9	1	Marshevet Myers	United States	11.38	Q
10	2	Ruddy Zang Milama	Gabon	11.43	
11	3	Véronique Mang	France	11.44	
12	1	Myriam Soumaré	France	11.47	
13	1	Ezinne Okparaebo	Norway	11.48	
13	1	Michelle-Lee Ahye	Trinidad and Tobago	11.48	
13	1	Jeanette Kwakye	Great Britain & N.I.	11.48	
13	2	Olesya Povh	Ukraine	11.48	
17	3	Jura Levy	Jamaica	11.53	
18	1	Yasmin Kwadwo	Germany	11.54	
18	3	Aleksandra Fedoriva	Russia	11.54	
20	3	Ana Cláudia Lemos Silva	Brazil	11.55	
21	1	Oludamola Osayomi	Nigeria	11.58	
22	2	Sheniqua Ferguson	Bahamas	11.59	
22	3	Chisato Fukushima	Japan	11.59	
24	2	Rosângela Santos	Brazil	11.61	

=== Final ===
Wind: -1.4 m/s

Rank	Lane	Name	Nationality	Time	Notes
1st place, gold medalist(s)	4	Carmelita Jeter	United States	10.90	
2nd place, silver medalist(s)	8	Veronica Campbell-Brown	Jamaica	10.97	
3rd place, bronze medalist(s)	5	Kelly-Ann Baptiste	Trinidad and Tobago	10.98	
4	3	Shelly-Ann Fraser-Pryce	Jamaica	10.99	
5	2	Blessing Okagbare	Nigeria	11.12	
6	6	Kerron Stewart	Jamaica	11.15	
7	1	Ivet Lalova	Bulgaria	11.27	
8	7	Marshevet Myers	United States	11.33	
