= Jamaica at the 2011 World Championships in Athletics =

- WA code: JAM
- National federation: Jamaica Athletics Administrative Association
- Website: www.trackandfieldja.com/frontpage.php

in Daegu
- Competitors: 45
- Medals: Gold 4 Silver 4 Bronze 1 Total 9

World Championships in Athletics appearances
- 1983; 1987; 1991; 1993; 1995; 1997; 1999; 2001; 2003; 2005; 2007; 2009; 2011; 2013; 2015; 2017; 2019; 2022; 2023

Jamaica competed at the 2011 World Championships in Athletics from August 27 to September 4 in Daegu, South Korea.

== Team selection ==
A team of 51 athletes was announced to represent the country in the event. The team is led by Olympic gold medalists and defending or former world champions Usain Bolt, Melaine Walker, Shelly-Ann Fraser-Pryce, and Veronica Campbell Brown. Because only the names of the athletes were published, the assignment of athletes to events is tentatively due to this year's performances. Publication of the entry list solves this problem.

The following athletes appeared on the preliminary Entry List, but not on the Official Start List of the specific event, resulting in a total number of 45 competitors:

KEY:	Did not participate	Competed in another event

	Event	Athlete
Men	100 metres	Asafa Powell
Men	200 metres	Kenroy Anderson
Men	110 m hurdles	Keiron Stewart
Men	4 x 100 metres relay	Asafa Powell
Men	4 x 100 metres relay	Mario Forsythe
Men	4 x 400 metres relay	DeWayne Barrett
Women	100 metres	Sherone Simpson
Women	200 metres	Aleen Bailey
Women	400 metres	Davita Prendergast
Women	4 x 100 metres relay	Schillonie Calvert
Women	4 x 100 metres relay	Aleen Bailey

== Medalists ==
The following competitors from Jamaica won medals at the Championships

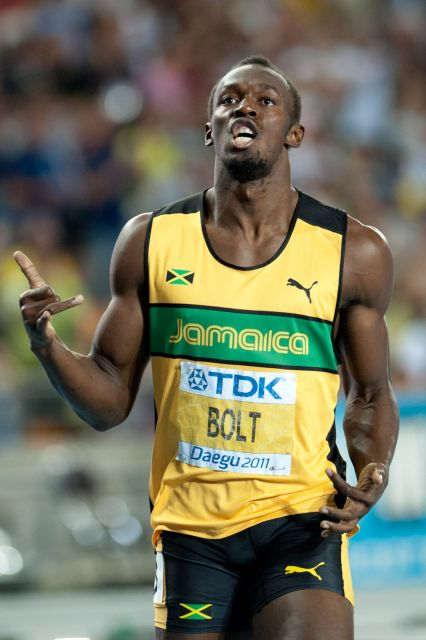
Usain Bolt won both the gold medal in the Men's 200 metres and 4 x 100 metres relay event at this year's championships

Medal	Athlete	Event
Gold	Yohan Blake	100 metres
Gold	Usain Bolt	200 metres
Gold	Nesta Carter; Michael Frater; Yohan Blake; Usain Bolt; Dexter Lee	4 x 100 metres relay
Gold	Veronica Campbell Brown	200 metres
Silver	Veronica Campbell Brown	100 metres
Silver	Melaine Walker	400 m hurdles
Silver	Shelly-Ann Fraser-Pryce; Kerron Stewart; Sherone Simpson; Veronica Campbell Brown; Jura Levy	4 x 100 metres relay
Silver	Rosemarie Whyte; Davita Prendergast; Novlene Williams-Mills; Shericka Williams; Shereefa Lloyd; Patricia Hall	4 x 400 metres relay
Bronze	Allodin Fothergill; Jermaine Gonzales; Riker Hylton; Leford Green; Lansford Spence	4 x 400 metres relay

== Results ==
=== Men ===
Athlete	Event	Preliminaries		Heats		Semifinals		Final	
Athlete	Event	Time Width Height	Rank	Time Width Height	Rank	Time Width Height	Rank	Time Width Height	Rank
Usain Bolt	100 metres			10.10	1	10.05	2	DSQ - False start	
Michael Frater	100 metres			10.26	7	10.23	13	Did not advance	
Yohan Blake	100 metres			10.12	2	9.95 (SB)	1	9.92 (SB)	1st place, gold medalist(s)
Nesta Carter	100 metres			10.26	7	10.16	9	10.95	7
Usain Bolt	200 metres			20.30	1	20.31	2	19.40 WL	1st place, gold medalist(s)
Nickel Ashmeade	200 metres			20.47	5	20.32	3	20.29	5
Mario Forsythe	200 metres			20.68	15	20.63	10	Did not advance	
Marvin Anderson	200 metres			21.09	38	Did not advance			
Jermaine Gonzales	400 metres			45.12	5	44.99	2	44.99	4
Riker Hylton	400 metres			45.54	21	46.99	24	Did not advance	
Dwight Thomas	110 m hurdles			13.31	4	13.56	8	Did not finish	
Andrew Riley	110 m hurdles			13.47	8	13.75	14	Did not advance	
Richard Phillips	110 m hurdles			13.53	12	13.76	15	Did not advance	
Isa Phillips	400 m hurdles			48.64 SB	4	49.16	10	Did not advance	
Leford Green	400 m hurdles			49.45	14	49.29	11	Did not advance	
Josef Robertson	400 m hurdles			50.29	26	50.39	22	Did not advance	
Nesta Carter; Michael Frater; Yohan Blake; Usain Bolt; Dexter Lee	4 x 100 metres relay			38.07 SB	3			37.04 WR	1st place, gold medalist(s)
Allodin Fothergill; Jermaine Gonzales; Riker Hylton; Leford Green; Lansford Spence	4 x 400 metres relay			2:59.13 SB	2			3:00.10	3rd place, bronze medalist(s)
Damar Forbes	Long jump	7.91	20					Did not advance	
Wilbert Walker	Triple jump	15.97	24					Did not advance	
Jason Morgan	Discus throw	61.75	18					Did not advance	

Decathlon

Maurice Smith	Decathlon			
Maurice Smith	Event	Results	Points	Rank
	100 m	10.98	865	15
	Long jump	7.06 m	828	22
	Shot put	15.15 m	799	8
	High jump	1.93 m	740	22
	400 m	50.27	802	19
	110 m hurdles	14.68	889	15
	Discus throw	45.63 m	780	13
	Pole vault	Did not advance		
	Javelin throw	Did not advance		
	1500 m	Did not advance		
Total		Did not finish		

=== Women ===
Athlete	Event	Preliminaries		Heats		Semifinals		Final	
Athlete	Event	Time Width Height	Rank	Time Width Height	Rank	Time Width Height	Rank	Time Width Height	Rank
Veronica Campbell Brown	100 metres			11.18	8	11.06	4	10.97	2nd place, silver medalist(s)
Shelly-Ann Fraser-Pryce	100 metres			11.12	4	11.03	2	10.99	4
Kerron Stewart	100 metres			11.12	4	11.26	7	11.15	6
Jura Levy	100 metres			11.33	20	11.53	17	Did not advance	
Veronica Campbell Brown	200 metres			22.46	1	22.53	3	22.22 SB	1st place, gold medalist(s)
Kerron Stewart	200 metres			22.83	9	22.77	5	22.70	5
Sherone Simpson	200 metres			22.94	15	22.88	8	23.17	8
Shericka Williams	400 metres			51.66 Q	9	50.46 Q, SB	5	50.79	6
Novlene Williams-Mills	400 metres			51.30 Q	2	50.48 Q	6	52.89	8
Rosemarie Whyte	400 metres			51.38 Q	5	50.90	10	Did not advance	
Kenia Sinclair	800 metres			2:01.66	15	1:58.93	7	1:58.66	7
Brigitte Foster-Hylton	100 m hurdles			12.96 SB	11	12.87 SB	10	Did not advance	
Indira Spence	100 m hurdles			13.07 SB	17	12.93 PB	13	Did not advance	
Vonette Dixon	100 m hurdles			12.82	4	13.00	17	Did not advance	
Melaine Walker	400 m hurdles			54.86	1	54.97	5	52.73 SB	2nd place, silver medalist(s)
Kaliese Spencer	400 m hurdles			54.93	3	55.02	6	54.01	4
Ristananna Tracey	400 m hurdles			55.96	14	55.55	13	Did not advance	
Nickiesha Wilson	400 m hurdles			56.08	16	56.58	19	Did not advance	
Korene Hinds	3000 metres steeplechase			9:52.11	20			Did not advance	
Mardrea Hyman	3000 metres steeplechase			DNF				Did not advance	
Shelly-Ann Fraser-Pryce; Kerron Stewart; Sherone Simpson; Veronica Campbell Brown; Jura Levy	4 x 100 metres relay			42.23 SB	2			41.70 NR	2nd place, silver medalist(s)
Rosemarie Whyte; Davita Prendergast; Novlene Williams-Mills; Shericka Williams; Shereefa Lloyd; Patricia Hall	4 x 400 metres relay			3:22.01 SB	2			3:18.71 NR	2nd place, silver medalist(s)
Jovanee Jarrett	Long jump	6.19	28					Did not advance	
Kimberly Williams	Triple jump	14.06	14					Did not advance	
