= Yelena Churakova =

Russian track and field athlete

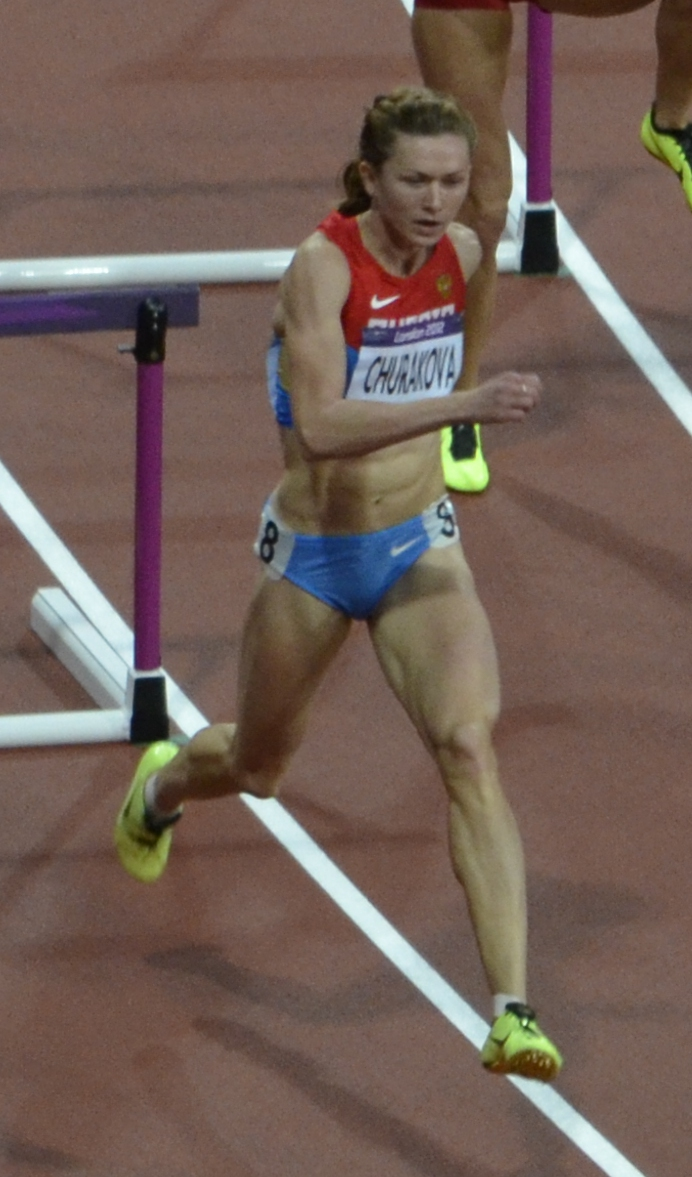
- Yelena Churakova at the 2012 Summer Olympics

Personal information
- Born: December 16, 1986 (age 38)
- Height: 1.74 m (5 ft 8 1/2 in)
- Weight: 56 kg (123 lb)

Sport
- Country: Russia
- Sport: Athletics
- Event: 400 metres hurdles

Yelena Anatolyevna Churakova (Russian: Елена Анатольевна Чуракова; born December 16, 1986) is a Russian track and field athlete who specialises in the 400 metres hurdles. She participated in the 2012 Olympics, reaching a semifinal.

In January 2013, she tested positive for testosterone and on April 2 was disqualified for two years.

== International competitions ==
Year	Competition	Venue	Position	Event	Notes
2009	World Championships	Berlin, Germany	5th (sf)	400 m hurdles	56.11
2011	World Championships	Daegu, South Korea	8th	400 m hurdles	55.17
2012	European Championships	Helsinki, Finland	5th	400 m hurdles	54.78 (PB)
2012	Olympic Games	London, United Kingdom	5th (sf)	400 m hurdles	55.70
