= Yannick Lesourd =

French sprinter

Personal information
- Nationality: French
- Born: 3 April 1988 (age 38) Dreux, Eure-et-Loir

Sport
- Sport: Running

Achievements and titles
- Personal best: 100 m: 10.29 s (Albi 2011)
Medal record
Men's Athletics
Representing France
World Championships
Silver medal – second place	2011 Daegu	4 × 100 m relay
European Junior Championships
Silver medal – second place	2007 Hengelo	100 m

Yannick Lesourd (born 3 April 1988 in Dreux) is a French track and field sprint athlete.

Lesourd represented France at the 2008 Summer Olympics in Beijing. He competed at the 4 × 100 metres relay together with Martial Mbandjock, Manuel Reynaert and Samuel Coco-Viloin. In their qualification heat they placed sixth in a time of 39.53 seconds and they were eliminated.

At the 2011 World Championships in Daegu, South Korea, Lesourd won a silver medal alongside teammates Teddy Tinmar, Christophe Lemaitre, and Jimmy Vicaut. The four contributed to an unexpected second-place finish with a time of 38.20 seconds, though fell well behind Jamaica's world record-setting run of 37.04 seconds. According to accounts from French journalists, the four gained their advantage after the American, British, and Trinidadian teams suffered mishaps during the final baton exchanges. The French team, in lane 8, avoided the mishaps and seized the opportunity.
