= Carmelita Jeter =

American sprinter (born 1979)

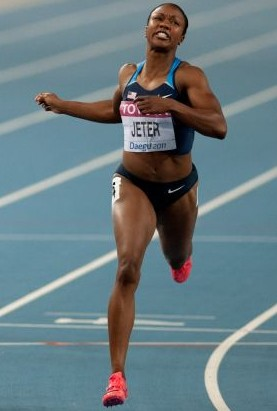
- Jeter at the 2011 World Championships

Personal information
- Born: November 24, 1979 (age 46) Los Angeles, California, U.S.
- Height: 5 ft 4 in (1.63 m)
- Weight: 135 lb (61 kg)

Sport
- Country: United States
- Sport: Running
- Events: 100 meters, 200 meters
Medal record
Event	1st	2nd	3rd
Olympic Games	1	1	1
World Championships	3	1	3
World Indoor Championships	0	1	0
World Athletics Final	2	0	0
Total	6	3	4
Olympic Games
Gold medal – first place	2012 London	4 × 100 m relay
Silver medal – second place	2012 London	100 m
Bronze medal – third place	2012 London	200 m
World Championships
Gold medal – first place	2007 Osaka	4 × 100 m relay
Gold medal – first place	2011 Daegu	100 m
Gold medal – first place	2011 Daegu	4 × 100 m relay
Silver medal – second place	2011 Daegu	200 m
Bronze medal – third place	2007 Osaka	100 m
Bronze medal – third place	2009 Berlin	100 m
Bronze medal – third place	2013 Moscow	100 m
World Indoor Championships
Silver medal – second place	2010 Doha	60 m
World Relay Championships
Silver medal – second place	2015 Nassau	4 × 100 m relay
World Athletics Final
Gold medal – first place	2007 Stuttgart	100 m
Gold medal – first place	2009 Thessaloniki	100 m

Carmelita Jeter (/ˈdʒɛtər/ JET-tər, born November 24, 1979) is a retired American sprinter, who competed in the 60 metres, 100 m and 200 m. For over a decade, between 2009 and 2021, Jeter was called the "Fastest woman alive" after running a 100 m personal best of 10.64 seconds at the 2009 Shanghai Golden Grand Prix. In the 100 m, she was the 2011 world champion and the 2012 Olympic silver medalist.

She won the 100 m bronze at the 2007 World Championships in Athletics and a gold at the World Athletics Final. She won a second World Championship bronze in 2009. Her personal best of 10.64 s makes her the fifth fastest woman ever in the 100 m, behind Florence Griffith Joyner (10.49 s), Elaine Thompson-Herah (10.54 s), Shelly-Ann Fraser-Pryce (10.60 s), and Melissa Jefferson-Wooden (10.61 s).

In May 2023, she was named the new head coach of the track & field and cross country programs at the University of Nevada, Las Vegas (UNLV).

== Early life ==
Jeter was born on November 24, 1979.

Jeter attended Bishop Montgomery High School in Torrance, California. Initially, basketball was the preferred sport in her family, and her younger brother, Eugene, later joined the Sacramento Kings. Her basketball coach suggested that she try out track, and an 11.7-second run confirmed her natural talent for sprinting. Jeter graduated from California State University, Dominguez Hills, which is located in Carson, California, with a bachelor's degree in physical education. Jeter set the record for most NCAA medals by a CSUDH track athlete and became the university's first U.S. Olympic Trials qualifier. A recurring hamstring problem kept her out of competition for much of 2003–05, and it was not until 2007 that she made her first impact in senior track and field athletics, having undergone treatment with deep tissue massage.

== International success ==
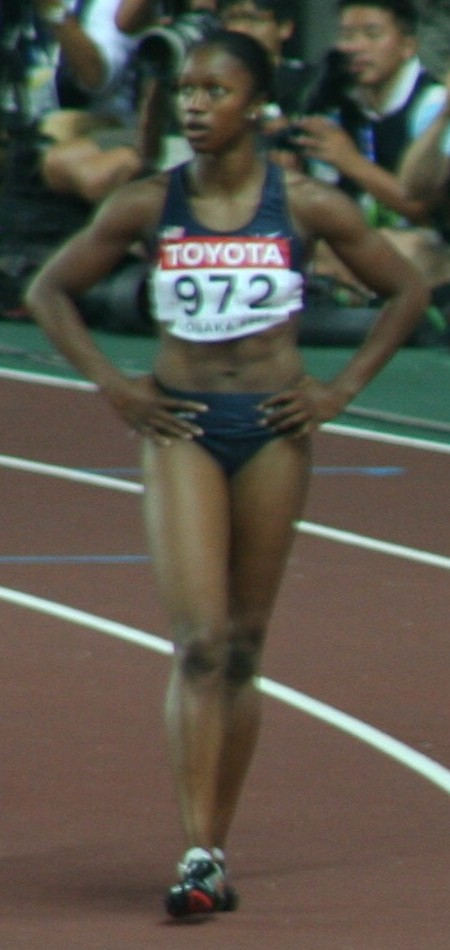
Jeter at the 2007 World Championships

In 2007, Jeter won a silver medal in the 60 meters at the USA Indoor Track and Field Championships with a personal best of 7.17 seconds, and she remained in good form, improving her 100 m best to 11.04 seconds to take fourth place in the 100 m at the Adidas Track Classic. Building upon this, she qualified for her first major competition by finishing third at the national championships behind Torri Edwards and Lauryn Williams. She went on to win the bronze medal at the World Championships in a personal best time of 11.02 seconds, as well as taking the 100 m gold at the 2007 World Athletics Final.

The following year, she competed at the 100 and 200 m U.S. Olympic trials. Although she set a 100 m best of 10.97 seconds in the quarter-finals, she did not progress beyond the semifinals, finishing just two hundredths out of the qualifying positions. A sixth-place finish in the 200 m meant she had not made the 2008 Summer Olympics team, despite being one of the favourites for selection. She qualified for the 100 and 200 m races at the 2008 World Athletics Final, but only managed fourth and fifth place, respectively. She changed coach in November, deciding to work with John Smith, who had previously coached athletes such as Maurice Greene. Smith began completely remodelling Jeter's running style.

In her 2009 season, she showed strong performances going into the 2009 World Championships in Athletics. She ran 7.11 seconds in the 60 m in the indoor season, the fastest by any athlete that year and a personal best. She remained in-form in her outdoor season, recording a fast 10.96 seconds at the Mt. SAC Relays, winning gold at the 2009 Nike Prefontaine Classic, and taking her first national title at the 2009 U.S. Outdoor Championships. At the 2009 London Grand Prix, she placed first in the 100 m, clocking a personal best of 10.92; it was the third-fastest time at that point of the season, only slower than Jamaica's Shelly-Ann Fraser and Kerron Stewart. A week prior to the start of the World Championships, Jeter was part of a United States 4 × 100 m relay team that ran the fastest women's sprint relay in twelve years. Lauryn Williams, Allyson Felix, Muna Lee, and Jeter finished with a time of 41.58 seconds, bringing them to eighth on the all-time list.

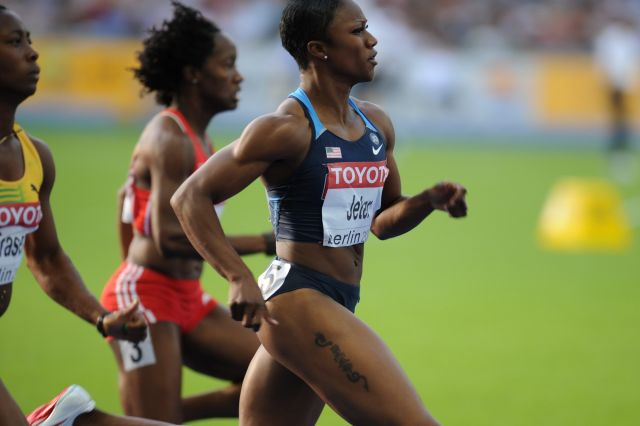
Jeter running in the World Championships in Berlin

At the 2009 World Athletics Championships, in Berlin, Jeter was one of the favorites for the gold medal as a 10.83-second personal best in the semis made her the fastest qualifier for the final. She ended up with her second World Championship bronze medal in the 100 m, however, finishing a tenth of a second behind Fraser and Stewart. The races after the championships proved more successful: she beat strong opposition in the IAAF Golden League meets in Zurich and Brussels with two sub-10.90 runs.

Jeter was also selected to run as part of the US relay team as the anchor runner. However, in their heat, during the change over between Alexandria Anderson and Muna Lee, Lee horrifically injured her leg which caused elimination from the relay event. Jamaica eventually claimed the gold medals.

She entered the 2009 IAAF World Athletics Final having won her last three races by a significant margin. Even taking this into account, Jeter surprised with one of the highlights of the final edition of the IAAF World Athletics Final. She won the 100 m race in Thessaloniki, Greece with a time of 10.67, to become the third fastest woman in history and set a championship record. This was the fastest run in twelve years; a time which had only been bettered by Marion Jones and Florence Griffith-Joyner, and 0.16 seconds faster than Jeter had ever run before. She ran even faster a week later at the Shanghai Golden Grand Prix, winning in 10.64 seconds (the fourth fastest time ever) to become the second fastest woman outright.

Her fast times were a double-edged sword in that they brought as much suspicion as they did appreciation. At age 30, Jeter had improved her personal record by over a third of a second within a single season and she ranked between Jones and Griffith-Joyner in the all-time lists. Given the history of the women's sprints and speculation about performance-enhancing drug use, Jeter said "I can't be upset about those questions [but] It's unfortunate that I work this hard and I don't get the credit I should get". She improved her 60 m best to 7.02 seconds to win at the USA Indoor Track and Field Championships. This was still slower than LaVerne Jones-Ferrette, and Jeter resolved to improve further for the 2010 IAAF World Indoor Championships.

She retired in 2017 after injury prevented her from competing in the 2016 Olympics.

== Achievements ==
=== International competitions ===
Representing the United States
Year	Competition	Venue	Position	Event	Time
2007	World Championships	Osaka, Japan	3rd	100 m	11.02
2007	World Championships	Osaka, Japan	1st (heats)	4 × 100 m relay	42.24
2007	IAAF World Athletics Final	Stuttgart, Germany	3rd	100 m	11.10
2008	IAAF World Athletics Final	Stuttgart, Germany	4th	100 m	11.21
2008	IAAF World Athletics Final	Stuttgart, Germany	5th	200 m	22.98
2009	World Championships	Berlin, Germany	3rd	100 m	10.90
2009	World Championships	Berlin, Germany	− (f)	4 × 100 m relay	DQ
2009	IAAF World Athletics Final	Tessaloniki, Greece	1st	100 m	10.67
2010	World Indoor Championships	Doha, Qatar	2nd	60 m	7.05
2011	World Championships	Daegu, South Korea	1st	100 m	10.90
2011	World Championships	Daegu, South Korea	2nd	200 m	22.37
2011	World Championships	Daegu, South Korea	1st	4 × 100 m relay	41.56
2012	Olympic Games	London, United Kingdom	2nd	100 m	10.78
2012	Olympic Games	London, United Kingdom	3rd	200 m	22.14
2012	Olympic Games	London, United Kingdom	1st	4 × 100 m relay	40.82 OR WR
2013	World Championships	Moscow, Russia	3rd	100 m	10.94
2015	World Relays	Nassau, Bahamas	2nd	4 × 100 m relay	42.32

=== Personal bests ===
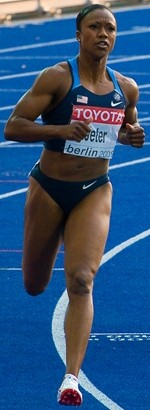
Jeter at the 2009 World Championships

Event	Time (seconds)	Venue	Date
55 meters	6.84	Fresno, California, United States	January 21, 2008
60 meters	7.02	Albuquerque, United States	February 28, 2010
100 meters	10.64	Shanghai, China	September 20, 2009
200 meters	22.11	Eugene, United States	June 30, 2012

- All information from IAAF profile.

Awards
Preceded by Allyson Felix	Women's Jesse Owens Award; 2011	Succeeded by Incumbent
