= 2011 World Championships in Athletics – Men's 4 × 100 metres relay =

Official Video

The Men's 4 × 100 metres relay event at the 2011 World Championships in Athletics was held at the Daegu Stadium on 4 September 2011.

The winning margin was 1.16 seconds which as of 2024 remains the only time the men's 4 × 100 metres relay has been won by more than a second at these championships.

USA won the first semi-final with deliberate handoffs, setting the world leader. France followed them into the final. The second semi-final was won by Trinidad and Tobago, ahead of favored Jamaica. Saint Kitts and Nevis set their national record in making the time qualifier in third. The third semi-final was much closer as Great Britain led Poland, with Italy making the final time qualifier.

In the final, Nesta Carter put Jamaica out into the lead, but Justin Gatlin ran down Michael Frater to put the USA even with Jamaica. On the third leg, Yohan Blake again edged Jamaica into the lead. Going into the final handoff, Darvis Patton of USA clipped Britain's Harry Aikines-Aryeetey and fell into a forward roll. American anchor Walter Dix never saw the baton and the British team also did not finish the race. In addition, Patton's fall seriously impeded Richard Thompson, Trinidad and Tobago's anchor, which caused his team to finish last. Meanwhile Usain Bolt took the baton and pulled away. Jamaica bettered their own World Record to finish in a time of 37.04. It was the only world record to be set at the championships. France finished second with Saint Kitts and Nevis third.

== Medalists ==
Usain Bolt wins the gold medal for Jamaica

Gold	Silver	Bronze
Jamaica; Nesta Carter; Michael Frater; Yohan Blake; Usain Bolt; Dexter Lee*	France; Teddy Tinmar; Christophe Lemaitre; Yannick Lesourd; Jimmy Vicaut	Saint Kitts and Nevis; Jason Rogers; Kim Collins; Antoine Adams; Brijesh Lawrence

== Records ==
Prior to the competition, the established records were as follows.

World record	Jamaica (Nesta Carter, Michael Frater, Usain Bolt, Asafa Powell)	37.10	Beijing, PR China	22 August 2008
Championship record	Jamaica (Usain Bolt, Michael Frater, Steve Mullings, Asafa Powell)	37.31	Berlin, Germany	22 August 2009
World leading	United States (Trell Kimmons, Mike Rodgers, Justin Gatlin, Walter Dix)	37.90	Lignano Sabbiadoro, Italy	19 July 2011
African record	Nigeria (Osmond Ezinwa, Olapade Adeniken, Francis Obikwelu, Davidson Ezinwa)	37.94	Athens, Greece	9 August 1997
Asian record	Japan (Nobuharu Asahara, Shinji Takahira, Shingo Suetsugu, Naoki Tsukahara)	38.03	Osaka, Japan	1 September 2007
North, Central American and Caribbean record	Jamaica (Nesta Carter, Michael Frater, Usain Bolt, Asafa Powell)	37.10	Beijing, PR China	22 August 2008
South American record	Brazil (Vicente de Lima, Édson Ribeiro, André da Silva, Claudinei da Silva)	37.90	Sydney, Australia	30 September 2000
European record	Great Britain (Jason Gardener, Darren Campbell, Marlon Devonish, Dwain Chambers)	37.73	Seville, Spain	29 August 1999
Oceanian record	Australia (Paul Henderson, Tim Jackson, Steve Brimacombe, Damien Marsh)	38.17	Gothenburg, Sweden	12 August 1995

== Schedule ==
Date	Time	Round
4 September 2011	19:00	Heats
4 September 2011	21:00	Final

== Results ==
KEY:	q	Fastest non-qualifiers	Q	Qualified	NR	National record	PB	Personal best	SB	Seasonal best

=== Heats ===
Qualification: First 2 of each heat (Q) plus the 2 fastest times (q) advance to the final.

Rank	Heat	Nation	Athletes	Time	Notes
1	1	United States	Trell Kimmons, Justin Gatlin, Maurice Mitchell, Travis Padgett	37.79	Q, WL
2	2	Trinidad and Tobago	Keston Bledman, Marc Burns, Aaron Armstrong, Richard Thompson	37.91	Q, SB
3	2	Jamaica	Nesta Carter, Michael Frater, Yohan Blake, Dexter Lee	38.07	Q, SB
4	3	Great Britain & N.I.	Christian Malcolm, Craig Pickering, Marlon Devonish, Harry Aikines-Aryeetey	38.29	Q, SB
5	3	Poland	Paweł Stempel, Dariusz Kuć, Robert Kubaczyk, Kamil Kryński	38.37	Q, SB
6	1	France	Teddy Tinmar, Christophe Lemaitre, Yannick Lesourd, Jimmy Vicaut	38.38	Q, SB
7	3	Italy	Michael Tumi, Simone Collio, Emanuele Di Gregorio, Fabio Cerutti	38.41	q, SB
8	2	Saint Kitts and Nevis	Jason Rogers, Kim Collins, Antoine Adams, Brijesh Lawrence	38.47	q, NR
9	2	Japan	Yuichi Kobayashi, Masashi Eriguchi, Shinji Takahira, Hitoshi Saito	38.66	SB
10	3	Australia	Anthony Alozie, Matt Davies, Aaron Rouge-Serret, Isaac Ntiamoah	38.69	SB
11	2	South Africa	Hannes Dreyer, Ofentse Mogawane, Roscoe Engel, Thuso Mpuang	38.72	SB
12	2	China	Chen Qiang, Liang Jiahong, Su Bingtian, Lao Yi	38.87	SB
13	2	Puerto Rico	Marcos Amalbert, Carlos Rodríguez, Marquis Holston, Miguel López	39.04	NR
14	1	Portugal	Ricardo Monteiro, João Ferreira, Arnaldo Abrantes, Yazaldes Nascimento	39.09	SB
15	1	Ghana	Emmanuel Kubi, Tim Abeyie, Ashhad Agyapong, Aziz Zakari	39.17	
16	1	Chinese Taipei	Wang Wen-Tang, Liu Yuan-Kai, Tsai Meng-Lin, Yi Wei-Chen	39.30	
17	3	Canada	Sam Effah, Gavin Smellie, Jared Connaughton, Justyn Warner	39.28	
18	3	Thailand	Weerawat Pharueang, Suppachai Chimdee, Sompote Suwannarangsri, Jirapong Meenapra	39.54	SB
	1	Brazil	Diego Cavalcanti, Sandro Viana, Nilson André, Bruno de Barros	DSQ	
	3	South Korea	Yeo Ho-Suah, Cho Kyu-won, Kim Kukyoung, Lim Hee-nam	DSQ	
	3	Netherlands	Giovanni Codrington, Brian Mariano, Jerrel Feller, Patrick van Luijk	DSQ	
	2	Germany	Tobias Unger, Marius Broening, Sebastian Ernst, Alex Schaf	DNF	
	1	Switzerland	Pascal Mancini, Reto Schenkel, Alex Wilson, Marc Schneeberger	DNF	

=== Final ===
Rank	Lane	Nation	Athletes	Time	Notes
1st place, gold medalist(s)	6	Jamaica	Nesta Carter, Michael Frater, Yohan Blake, Usain Bolt	37.04	WR
2nd place, silver medalist(s)	8	France	Teddy Tinmar, Christophe Lemaitre, Yannick Lesourd, Jimmy Vicaut	38.20	SB
3rd place, bronze medalist(s)	1	Saint Kitts and Nevis	Jason Rogers, Kim Collins, Antoine Adams, Brijesh Lawrence	38.49	
4	7	Poland	Paweł Stempel, Dariusz Kuć, Robert Kubaczyk, Kamil Kryński	38.50	
5	2	Italy	Michael Tumi, Simone Collio, Emanuele Di Gregorio, Fabio Cerutti	38.96	
6	5	Trinidad and Tobago	Keston Bledman, Marc Burns, Aaron Armstrong, Richard Thompson	39.01 *	
	4	United States	Trell Kimmons, Justin Gatlin, Darvis Patton, Walter Dix	DNF	
	3	Great Britain & N.I.	Christian Malcolm, Craig Pickering, Marlon Devonish, Harry Aikines-Aryeetey	DNF	

* Trinidad and Tobago's Aaron Armstrong tripped over USA's falling Darvis Patton, causing them to finish last.
