= Trinidad and Tobago at the 2011 World Championships in Athletics =

- WA code: TRI
- National federation: National Association of Athletics Administrations of Trinidad & Tobago
- Website: www.ttnaaa.org

in Daegu
- Competitors: 16
- Medals: Gold 0 Silver 0 Bronze 1 Total 1

World Championships in Athletics appearances
- 1983; 1987; 1991; 1993; 1995; 1997; 1999; 2001; 2003; 2005; 2007; 2009; 2011; 2013; 2015; 2017; 2019; 2022; 2023

Trinidad and Tobago competed at the 2011 World Championships in Athletics from August 27 to September 4 in Daegu, South Korea.

== Team selection ==
A team of 20 athletes was announced to represent the country in the event. The team was to be led by the sprinters Richard "Torpedo" Thompson and Kelly-Ann Baptiste. The final team on the entry list comprised 19 athletes. The following athletes appeared on the preliminary entry list, but not on the official start list of the specific event: resulting in a total number of 16 competitors:

KEY:	Did not participate	Competed in another event

	Event	Athlete
Men	4 x 100 metres relay	Rondel Sorrillo
Men	4 x 100 metres relay	Emmanuel Callender
Men	4 x 400 metres relay	Jehue Gordon
Men	4 x 400 metres relay	Jovon Toppin
Women	200 metres	Semoy Hackett
Women	4 x 100 metres relay	Ayanna Hutchinson
Women	4 x 100 metres relay	Reyare Thomas

== Medalists ==
The following competitor from Trinidad and Tobago won a medal at the Championships

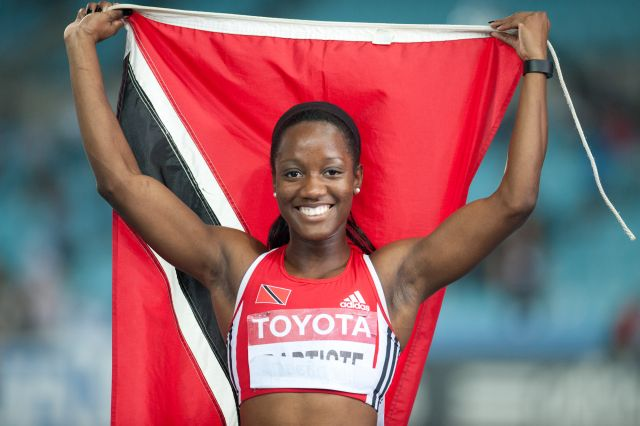
Kelly-Ann Baptiste won a bronze medal in the Women's 100 metres event

Medal	Athlete	Event
Bronze	Kelly-Ann Baptiste	100 metres

== Results ==
=== Men ===
Athlete	Event	Preliminaries		Heats		Semifinals		Final	
Athlete	Event	Time Width Height	Rank	Time Width Height	Rank	Time Width Height	Rank	Time Width Height	Rank
Keston Bledman	100 metres			10.32	13 Q	10.14	7	Did not advance	
Richard Thompson	100 metres			10.34	18 Q	10.20	10	Did not advance	
Aaron Armstrong	100 metres			10.48	29	Did not advance			
Rondel Sorrillo	200 metres			20.68	15	20.56	8	20.34	7
Emmanuel Callender	200 metres			20.97	33	Did not advance			
Renny Quow	400 metres			44.84 SB	4 Q	45.72	13	Did not advance	
Jehue Gordon	400 m hurdles			49.90	24 Q	49.08	9	Did not advance	
Keston Bledman; Marc Burns; Aaron Armstrong; Richard Thompson	4 x 100 metres relay			37.91 SB	2			39.01	6
Zwede Hewitt; Jarrin Solomon; Deon Lendore; Renny Quow	4 x 400 metres relay			3:02.47	12			Did not advance	

=== Women ===
Athlete	Event	Preliminaries		Heats		Semifinals		Final	
Athlete	Event	Time Width Height	Rank	Time Width Height	Rank	Time Width Height	Rank	Time Width Height	Rank
Kelly-Ann Baptiste	100 metres			11.26	15	11.05	3	10.98	3rd place, bronze medalist(s)
Semoy Hackett	100 metres			11.26	15	11.35	8	Did not advance	
Michelle-Lee Ahye	100 metres			11.19 PB	9	11.48	13	Did not advance	
Kai Selvon	200 metres			22.89 PB	12	23.11	17	Did not advance	
Kai Selvon; Kelly-Ann Baptiste; Semoy Hackett; Michelle-Lee Ahye	4 x 100 metres relay			DQ				DQ	
Cleopatra Borel	Shot put	18.95	7 Q					17.62	13
