= Nigeria at the 2011 World Championships in Athletics =

- WA code: NGR
- National federation: Athletics Federation of Nigeria
- Website: www.athleticsnigeria.org

in Daegu
- Competitors: 15
- Medals: Gold 0 Silver 0 Bronze 0 Total 0

World Championships in Athletics appearances
- 1983; 1987; 1991; 1993; 1995; 1997; 1999; 2001; 2003; 2005; 2007; 2009; 2011; 2013; 2015; 2017; 2019; 2022; 2023; 2025

Nigeria competed at the 2011 World Championships in Athletics from August 27 to September 4 in Daegu, South Korea.

== Team selection ==
A team of 17 athletes was announced to represent the country in the event. The team was led by "Africa track queen" Blessing Okagbare competing in the 100m 4 × 100 m and Long Jump events. However, the IAAF has rejected the USA-born duo of sprinter, Gloria Asumnu and quarter-miler, Ibukun Blessing Mayungbe as eligible athletes to compete for Nigeria at the 13th IAAF World Championships in Athletics.

The final team on the entry list comprises the names of 14 athletes. After a protest by the Athletics Federation of Nigeria, Gloria Asumnu was declared eligible to start competing for Nigeria and participated in the Women's 4 x 100 metres relay event.

The following athletes appeared on the preliminary Entry List, but not on the Official Start List of the specific event, resulting in a total number of 15 competitors:

KEY:	Did not participate	Competed in another event

	Event	Athlete
Women	4 x 100 metres relay	Seun Adigun
Women	4 x 100 metres relay	Endurance Abinuwa
Women	4 x 400 metres relay	Endurance Abinuwa

== Results ==
=== Men ===
Athlete	Event	Preliminaries		Heats		Semifinals		Final	
Athlete	Event	Time Width Height	Rank	Time Width Height	Rank	Time Width Height	Rank	Time Width Height	Rank
Ogho-Oghene Egwero	100 metres			10.57	36	Did not advance			
Peter Emelieze	100 metres			10.58	38	Did not advance			
Stanley Gbagbeke	Long jump	DNS						Did not advance	
Tosin Oke	Triple jump	16.60	16					Did not advance	

=== Women ===
Athlete	Event	Preliminaries		Heats		Semifinals		Final	
Athlete	Event	Time Width Height	Rank	Time Width Height	Rank	Time Width Height	Rank	Time Width Height	Rank
Blessing Okagbare	100 metres			11.09	1	11.22	5	11.12	5
Oludamola Osayomi	100 metres			11.14	6	11.58	21	Did not advance	
Endurance Abinuwa	200 metres			23.53	26	Did not advance			
Blessing Okagbare	200 metres			DNS		Did not advance			
Seun Adigun	100 m hurdles			13.13 SB	21	13.14	19	Did not advance	
Muizat Ajoke Odumosu	400 m hurdles			56.23	19 Q	56.41	17	Did not advance	
Gloria Asumnu; Oludamola Osayomi; Agnes Osazuwa; Blessing Okagbare	4 x 100 metres relay			42.74 SB	6			42.93	7
Omolara Omotosho; Muizat Ajoke Odumosu; Margaret Etim; Bukola Abogunloko	4 x 400 metres relay			3:25.59 SB	7			3:29.82	8
Blessing Okagbare	Long jump	6.36	18					Did not advance	
Doreen Amata	High jump	1.95 =NR	7					1.93	8
