= 2011 World Championships in Athletics – Women's 400 metres hurdles =

Women's 400 metres hurdles at the 2011 World Championships in Athletics
- Venue: Daegu Stadium
- Location: Daegu, South Korea
- Dates: 29 August 2011; 30 August 2011; 1 September 2011
- Winning time: 52.47 s NR

Medalists
gold medal	Lashinda Demus	United States
silver medal	Melaine Walker	Jamaica
bronze medal	Natalya Antyukh	Russia

Official Video

The Women's 400 metres hurdles event at the 2011 World Championships in Athletics was held at the Daegu Stadium on August 29, 30 and September 1.

Kaliese Spencer had the fastest time of the year before the competition and led in the Diamond League rankings. Fellow Jamaican Melaine Walker (the reigning world and Olympic champion) was also present, as was Lashinda Demus, the runner-up in 2009. Czech athlete Zuzana Hejnová was the second fastest entrant and was second in the rankings in the Diamond League. The three medallists from the 2010 European Championships – Natalya Antyukh, Vania Stambolova, and Perri Shakes-Drayton – were the other athletes in contention for a medal.

Lashinda Demus in lane 3, broke quickly from the start, quickly making up the stagger on lane 4 Zuzana Hejnová. In lane 8, defending champion Melaine Walker was also out fast. Demus maintained her advantage as Kaliese Spencer made a run at her, but Spencer faltered. The stretch run was the top two finishers from the previous championship, but the medals were reversed as Demus set a new National Record for the United States and the number three all time mark in the event.

== Medalists ==
Gold	Silver	Bronze
Lashinda Demus; United States	Melaine Walker; Jamaica	Natalya Antyukh; Russia

== Records ==
World record	Yuliya Pechonkina (RUS)	52.34	Tula, Russia	8 August 2003
Championship record	Melaine Walker (JAM)	52.42	Berlin, Germany	20 August 2009
World leading	Kaliese Spencer (JAM)	52.79	London, Great Britain	5 August 2011
African record	Nezha Bidouane (MAR)	52.90	Sevilla, Spain	25 August 1999
Asian record	Qing Han (CHN)	53.96	Beijing, China	9 September 1993
Asian record	Yinglan Song (CHN)	53.96	Guangzhou, China	22 November 2001
North, Central American and Caribbean record	Melaine Walker (JAM)	52.42	Berlin, Germany	20 August 2009
South American record	Lucimar Teodoro (BRA)	55.84	Belém, Brazil	24 May 2009
European record	Yuliya Pechonkina (RUS)	52.34	Tula, Russia	8 August 2003
Oceanian record	Debbie Flintoff-King (AUS)	53.17	Seoul, South Korea	28 September 1988

== Qualification standards ==
A time	B time
55.40	56.55

== Schedule ==
Date	Time	Round
August 29, 2011	12:20	Heats
August 30, 2011	19:00	Semifinals
September 1, 2011	21:15	Final

== Results ==
KEY:	q	Fastest non-qualifiers	Q	Qualified	NR	National record	PB	Personal best	SB	Seasonal best

=== Heats ===
Qualification: First 4 in each heat (Q) and the next 4 fastest (q) advance to the semifinals.

Rank	Heat	Name	Nationality	Time	Notes
1	5	Melaine Walker	Jamaica	54.86	Q
2	5	Natalya Antyukh	Russia	54.88	Q
3	1	Kaliese Spencer	Jamaica	54.93	Q
3	3	Lashinda Demus	United States	54.93	Q
5	1	Anastasiya Rabchenyuk	Ukraine	55.08	Q
6	1	Queen Harrison	United States	55.11	Q
7	2	Zuzana Hejnová	Czech Republic	55.12	Q
8	4	Vania Stambolova	Bulgaria	55.29	Q
9	2	Elena Churakova	Russia	55.39	Q
10	2	Élodie Ouédraogo	Belgium	55.40	Q, PB
10	2	Hanna Titimets	Ukraine	55.40	Q
12	1	Lauren Boden	Australia	55.78	Q, SB
13	3	Perri Shakes-Drayton	Great Britain & N.I.	55.90	Q
14	4	Ristananna Tracey	Jamaica	55.96	Q
15	3	Hanna Yaroshchuk	Ukraine	55.99	Q
16	3	Nickiesha Wilson	Jamaica	56.08	Q
17	5	Wenda Theron	South Africa	56.13	Q, PB
18	4	Eilidh Child	Great Britain & N.I.	56.18	Q
19	4	Muizat Ajoke Odumosu	Nigeria	56.23	Q, SB
20	5	Jasmine Chaney	United States	56.28	Q
21	1	Vera Barbosa	Portugal	56.31	q
22	2	Sara Petersen	Denmark	56.32	q, NR
23	2	Nikolina Horvat	Croatia	56.60	q
24	5	Satomi Kubokura	Japan	56.66	q
25	5	Manuela Gentili	Italy	56.71	
26	4	Nagihan Karadere	Turkey	56.76	
27	1	Christine Merrill	Sri Lanka	57.05	
28	3	Jailma de Lima	Brazil	57.21	
29	3	Birsen Engin	Turkey	57.22	
30	2	Hanitrasoa Olga Razanamalala	Madagascar	57.25	PB
31	4	Stine Meland Tomb	Norway	57.51	
32	5	Amaliya Sharoyan	Armenia	58.54	NR
33	3	Sharolyn Scott	Costa Rica	58.78	
34	1	Bimbo Miel Ayedou	Benin	58.80	
35	4	Déborah Rodríguez	Uruguay	59.52	
36	5	Son Kyeong-mi	South Korea	1:00.21	
37	4	Jessica Aguilera	Nicaragua	1:02.78	
38	3	Fatima Sulaiman Dahman	Yemen	1:11.49	PB

=== Semifinals ===
Qualification: First 2 in each heat (Q) and the next 2 fastest (q) advance to the final.

Rank	Heat	Name	Nationality	Time	Notes
1	3	Lashinda Demus	United States	53.82	Q
2	2	Natalya Antyukh	Russia	54.51	Q
3	1	Vania Stambolova	Bulgaria	54.72	Q
4	3	Zuzana Hejnová	Czech Republic	54.76	Q
5	2	Melaine Walker	Jamaica	54.97	Q
6	1	Elena Churakova	Russia	55.02	Q
6	1	Kaliese Spencer	Jamaica	55.02	q
8	2	Anastasiya Rabchenyuk	Ukraine	55.06	q
9	3	Perri Shakes-Drayton	Great Britain & N.I.	55.07	
10	1	Hanna Yaroshchuk	Ukraine	55.09	
11	1	Élodie Ouédraogo	Belgium	55.29	PB
12	2	Queen Harrison	United States	55.44	
13	3	Ristananna Tracey	Jamaica	55.55	
14	3	Hanna Titimets	Ukraine	55.82	
15	1	Eilidh Child	Great Britain & N.I.	55.89	
16	1	Jasmine Chaney	United States	55.97	
17	2	Muizat Ajoke Odumosu	Nigeria	56.41	
18	3	Sara Petersen	Denmark	56.49	
19	2	Nickiesha Wilson	Jamaica	56.58	
20	3	Lauren Boden	Australia	56.68	
21	2	Satomi Kubokura	Japan	56.87	
22	1	Nikolina Horvat	Croatia	57.02	
23	2	Wenda Theron	South Africa	57.06	
24	3	Vera Barbosa	Portugal	57.70	

=== Final ===
Rank	Lane	Name	Nationality	Time	Notes
1st place, gold medalist(s)	3	Lashinda Demus	United States	52.47	WL, NR
2nd place, silver medalist(s)	8	Melaine Walker	Jamaica	52.73	SB
3rd place, bronze medalist(s)	5	Natalya Antyukh	Russia	53.85	
4	2	Kaliese Spencer	Jamaica	54.01	
5	1	Anastasiya Rabchenyuk	Ukraine	54.18	SB
6	6	Vania Stambolova	Bulgaria	54.23	
7	4	Zuzana Hejnová	Czech Republic	54.23	
8	7	Elena Churakova	Russia	55.17	
