= Barbados at the 2011 World Championships in Athletics =

- WA code: BAR
- National federation: Amateur Athletic Association of Barbados
- Website: www.aaabarbados.com

in Daegu
- Competitors: 4
- Medals: Gold 0 Silver 0 Bronze 0 Total 0

World Championships in Athletics appearances
- 1983; 1987; 1991; 1993; 1995; 1997; 1999; 2001; 2003; 2005; 2007; 2009; 2011; 2013; 2015; 2017; 2019; 2022; 2023

Barbados sent five athletes to the 2011 World Championships in Athletics in Daegu, South Korea. The team was led by the defending 100m hurdles world champion Ryan Brathwaite.

== Results ==
=== Men ===
Athlete	Event	Preliminaries		Heats		Semifinals		Final	
Athlete	Event	Time Width Height	Rank	Time Width Height	Rank	Time Width Height	Rank	Time Width Height	Rank
Andrew Hinds	100 metres			10.41 q	23	10.32	19	Did not advance	
Ramon Gitten	100 metres			10.42	24	Did not advance			
Ryan Brathwaite	110 m hurdles			13.57	18	Did not advance			

=== Women ===
Athlete	Event	Preliminaries		Heats		Semifinals		Final	
Athlete	Event	Time Width Height	Rank	Time Width Height	Rank	Time Width Height	Rank	Time Width Height	Rank
Kierre Beckles	100 m hurdles			13.44	31	Did not advance			
