= Orrin Ogumoro Pharmin =

Northern Mariana Islander sprinter

Personal information
- Nationality: Northern Mariana Islander
- Born: 8 December 1986 (age 39)

Sport
- Sport: Track and field
- Event: 100m

Orrin Ogumoro Pharmin (born 8 December 1986) is a Northern Mariana Islander sprinter. He competed in the 100 metres event at the 2011 World Championships in Athletics.
