= Sogelau Tuvalu =

American Samoan track and field athlete (born 1994)

Personal information
- Born: 5 June 1994 (age 32) American Samoa

Sport
- Country: American Samoa
- Sport: Athletics
- Events: 100 metres Shot put

Achievements and titles
- Personal best: 100m - 15.66s
- Updated on 5 March 2018

Sogelau Tuvalu (born 5 June 1994) is an American Samoan track and field athlete who represented American Samoa at the 2011 World Championships in Athletics in the 100 meters, despite being trained as a shot putter.

== 2011 World Athletics Championships ==
Having not qualified to compete at the shot put event, Tuvalu was entered into the 100 meters at the 2011 World Athletics Championships in Daegu, which had no qualification standard for smaller nations. Running in the fourth heat of the preliminary round, Tuvalu finished 5 seconds slower than first-placed Malaysian Mohd Noor Imran, finishing in 15.66s. Tuvalu is also one of the youngest debutants in the history of the World Athletics Championships, making his first and only appearance aged 17.
