= Yelizaveta Demirova =

Russian sprinter

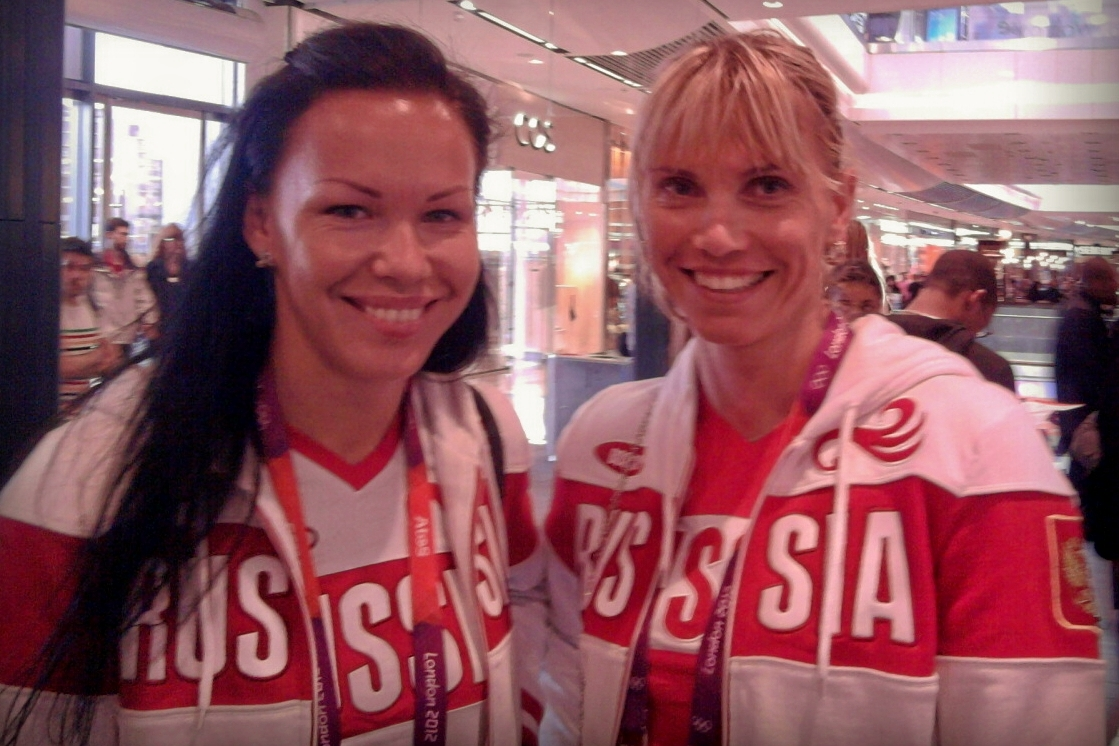
- Demirova (left)

Medal record

Women's athletics

Representing Russia

European Championships
Bronze medal – third place	2014 Zürich	4 x 100 m

Yelizaveta Demirova (née Savlinis; born 14 August 1987 in Gatchina) is a Russian track and field sprinter.

At the 2012 Summer Olympics, she competed in the Women's 200 metres and ran in the 4 × 100 m heats for the Russian team.
