= Nesta Carter =

Jamaican sprinter (born 1985)

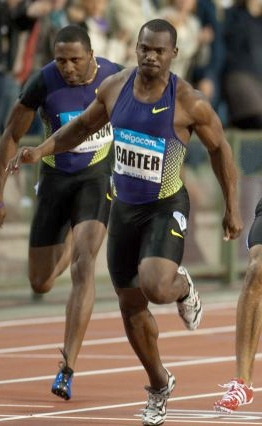
- Carter at the 2010 Memorial Van Damme

Personal information
- Born: October 11, 1985 (age 41) Banana Ground, Manchester, Jamaica
- Height: 1.73 m (5 ft 8 in)
- Weight: 78 kg (172 lb)

Sport
- Sport: Running
- Events: 100 metres, 200 metres
- Club: MVP Track & Field Club

Achievements and titles
- Personal bests: 100 m: 9.78 s (Rieti 2010); 200 m: 20.25 s (Kingston 2011)
Medal record
Men's athletics
Representing Jamaica
Olympic Games
Gold medal – first place	2012 London	4 × 100 m relay
Disqualified	2008 Beijing	4 × 100 m relay
World Championships
Gold medal – first place	2011 Daegu	4 × 100 m relay
Gold medal – first place	2013 Moscow	4 × 100 m relay
Gold medal – first place	2015 Beijing	4 × 100 m relay
Silver medal – second place	2007 Osaka	4 × 100 m relay
Bronze medal – third place	2013 Moscow	100 m
World Indoor Championships
Silver medal – second place	2012 Istanbul	60 m
World Relay Championships
Gold medal – first place	2014 Nassau	4 × 100 m relay
Silver medal – second place	2015 Nassau	4 × 100 m relay
Athletics World Cup
Silver medal – second place	2018 London	4×100 m relay
Central American and Caribbean Games
Gold medal – first place	2018 Barranquilla	100 m
Bronze medal – third place	2018 Barranquilla	4 × 100 m
World Junior Championships
Silver medal – second place	2004 Grosseto	4 × 100 m relay
Representing Americas
Continental Cup
Gold medal – first place	2014 Marrakesh	4 × 100 m

Nesta Carter OD (born October 11, 1985) is a Jamaican retired sprinter who specialized in the 100 metres event. Carter was successful as part of the Jamaican 4 × 100 metres relay team, taking gold and setting successive world records at the 2011 World Championships and 2012 London Olympics. He also won a 4 × 100 m silver medal at the 2007 World Championship and a gold at the 2015 World Championships. On August 11, 2013, Carter secured an individual 100 m World Championship bronze medal in Moscow, behind Justin Gatlin and teammate Usain Bolt. He followed this with another gold in the 4 × 100 metres relay.

In August 2010 he became only the fifth sprinter to run the 100 metres in less than 9.8 seconds. His 100 m personal best of 9.78 currently ranks him as the twelfth fastest man of all time, behind fellow Jamaicans Usain Bolt, Yohan Blake, Asafa Powell, Kishane Thompson, and Oblique Seville, Americans Tyson Gay, Justin Gatlin, Christian Coleman, Trayvon Bromell and Fred Kerley, and Kenyan Ferdinand Omanyala.

On 25 January 2017, the International Olympic Committee sanctioned Carter for doping at the 2008 Olympic Games, meaning that Carter and his teammates lost their gold medals for the men's 4 × 100 m relay. On 31 August 2021 Carter officially announced his retirement.

== Career ==
Carter attended Manchester High School in central Jamaica. He is a member of the MVP (a Jamaican track and field club. MVP stands for Maximising Velocity and Power).

=== 2002 ===
Representing his high school at the ISSA Championships Carter finished second in the Class 2 100 m in 11.58 s (wind −1.3 m/s), and fourth in the 200 m in 22.54 (wind −2.0 m/s). The 4 × 100 m relay team did not finish their heat.

=== 2003 ===
Carter's 11.01 was thirteenth fastest in the semi-finals of the Class 1 100 m at the ISSA Championships and he did not advance to the final. He finished seventh in the 200 m final, in 22.01 s. His school did not field a team for the 4 × 100 m relay.

=== 2004 ===
In April he finished third in the CARIFTA Games Under 20 200 m, in 21.10 (wind −1.4 m/s), and won gold with the Jamaican 4 × 100 m relay team in 39.48 s. Carter finished fourth in the 200 m at the June CAC Junior Championships, his time 21.35 s, and ran the third leg of the 4 × 100 m relay team which finished first in 40.63 s. He finished fourth in the 200 m semi-final at the July World Junior Championships in 21.24 s. In the semi-final of the 4 × 100 m relay Carter ran the third leg and the team qualified for the final in 39.90 s. The Jamaica team finished second in the final without Carter.

=== 2005 ===
At the ISSA Championships Carter finished second in the Class 1 100 m in 10.59 s, and second in the 200 m in 21.00 s. No relay team was fielded by his school.

=== 2006 ===
At the Jamaica International Invitational Carter won the 100 m B race in 10.41 s.

=== 2007 ===
In May Carter finished joint-third at the Jamaica International Invitational meet and won the Grande Premio Brasil Caixa de Atletismo in 10.20 s, his first win of an IAAF Grand Prix event.

At the Osaka World Championships Carter won his heat in 10.17 s, finished fourth in the quarter-final in 10.23 and finished seventh in the semi-final of the 100 m, his time 10.28 s. Carter ran the third leg of the 4 × 100 m relay team which finished second in a new national record of 37.89 s.

=== 2008 ===
At the inaugural UTech Track and Field Classic Carter ran a personal best 20.38 in the 200 m, bettering his previous best by 0.40 s.

Carter was named UTech Sportsman of the Year 2007/2008 on April 10.

Carter ran the third leg of the 4 × 100 m relay at the Penn Relays, the team winning the USA vs The World event in 39.14 s.

On May 25 Carter successfully defended his title at the Grande Premio Brasil Caixa de Atletismo, winning in 10.19 s. One week later he won the 100 m at DKB-ISTAF in a personal best 10.08, his first win at a Golden League event.

Carter did not report for the start of the 100 m final at the National Trials, due to a leg cramp. He made the Jamaican team for the Olympics after running a personal best 20.31 in the final of the 200 m.

At the July DN Galan in Stockholm Carter won race two in 9.98 s, a new personal best that made him just the fifth Jamaican under the 10 second barrier.

At the 2008 Olympics in Beijing he ran the third leg of the 4 × 100 metres relay semi-final with Michael Frater, Dwight Thomas and Asafa Powell. Their time of 38.31 s ranked second of sixteen nations in the first round. Thomas was replaced by Usain Bolt for the final, Carter ran the first leg and the team set a new world record of 37.10 s, claiming the gold medal. The split time for Carter's lead-off leg of the relay was 10.34 (USATF High Performance registered split analysis). In 2017 Carter was found guilty of using performance-enhancing drugs, resulting in him and the rest of the Jamaican team being stripped of the gold medals.

Carter equaled his personal best of 9.98 when he finished third at Athletissima 2008 in Lausanne. The race was won by Asafa Powell in a new personal best of 9.72 s.

At the Zagreb 2008 event Carter won in 10.23 s. Four days later Carter finished second in the 100 m at the World Athletics final in 10.07 s.

Carter was honoured in a homecoming celebration and received an Order of Distinction (Officer Rank) in recognition of his achievements at the Olympics.

=== 2009 ===
Carter ran on the MVP 4 × 100 m relay team at the Milo Western Relays held at the GC Foster College on February 14. The team recorded a new meet record and world leading time of 38.72 s.

Carter was nominated for the Laureus World Team of the Year award on April 16, as a member of the 2008 Jamaica Olympic sprint team. Two days later Carter ran a leg of the 4 × 100 m at the UTech Track and Field Classic at the National Stadium in Kingston, Jamaica. The winning time of 38.46 was a new meet record. Carter also finished third in the 200 m at the event in 20.69.

Carter next competed at the Penn Relays on April 25, in the 4 × 100 m relay. Asafa Powell on the fourth leg pulled up and finished ninth in 41.24. A report in the Jamaica Observer on the morning of the event indicated that Powell had injured his ankle in training and was not expected to run. On May 8 he finished seventh in 10.34 with a reported calf cramp at the Qatar Athletic Super Grand Prix.

At the Reebok Grand Prix in New York, Carter finished a disappointing ninth in 10.16 s. His entry was withdrawn from the Prefontaine Classic on the day of the event. A week before the National Championships on June 26 the Jamaica Amateur Athletic Association confirmed that no entry had been received for Carter. The president of MVP track club cited an injury.

=== 2010 ===
In 2010 Carter made some huge improvements in the 100 m races that he had run in the year, by lowering his PB in the 100 m from 9.91 to 9.78—ran in Rieti, Italy on August 29—which equalled the fastest time of 2010 over 100 m set by Tyson Gay a few weeks earlier in the year. The time also ranked Carter as the 5th fastest of all time, while still being the fourth fastest in Jamaica, behind Asafa Powell (9.72), Yohan Blake (9.69) and Usain Bolt (9.58).

=== 2011 ===
Carter managed to make the 100 m at the 2011 World Athletics Championships with Michael Frater, Yohan Blake and defending champion Usain Bolt. Carter, Blake and Bolt all made it to the final, though Carter had reportedly injured his leg just after the semi-final. In one of the most controversial finals, Usain Bolt false started and was immediately disqualified from the race under the IAAF's new false start policy. Yohan Blake won the gold in 9.92, with Walter Dix in second in 10.08, and Kim Collins in third in 10.09. Carter trailed in last (7th, due to Bolt's elimination) in 10.95. However, he managed to recover for his injury in time for the 4 × 100 m relay. Jamaica retained their world title in 37.04 seconds, a new world record and the first sub-37.10 by a relay team.

=== 2012 ===
As part of the Jamaican 4 × 100 metres relay team, setting the world record and Olympic record on August 11, 2012, at the 2012 London Olympics, of 36.84 seconds. This makes him part of the only 4 × 100 metres relay team so far to have gone under 37 seconds.

=== 2013 ===
In 2013, Carter participated at the Madrid Invitational, breaking the meeting record at 9.87, also being his season best. At the Moscow World Championships, Carter won the bronze medal in the 100 m in 9.95, behind American Justin Gatlin (9.85) and Jamaican teammate Usain Bolt (9.77). He won a third world championship relay gold, leading off the Jamaican relay team, made up of Carter, Kemar Bailey-Cole, Nickel Ashmeade and Bolt. The team won in 37.36 seconds. This win was Jamaica's fifth consecutive major championship sprint relay gold, winning the Olympics in Beijing 2008 and London 2012, and the world titles in Berlin 2009, Daegu 2011 and Moscow 2013.

=== 2014 ===
Carter confirmed interest in the World Indoor Championships in Sopot pending team selection.

=== 2015 ===
Carter went to the new season with a slow start. His season best was 9.98, behind American Ryan Bailey and teammate Asafa Powell. At the 2015 Bahamas World Relays, Nesta Carter ran the first leg at the 4 × 100 m relay, with exactly the same team that ran at the 2013 World Championships, which ended second behind USA relay team that consisted of Michael Rodgers, Justin Gatlin, Tyson Gay and Ryan Bailey. At the 2015 IAAF World Championships, the Jamaican team went on to the finals of the 4 × 100 meter relay, that consisted of Carter, Asafa Powell, Nickel Ashmeade and Usain Bolt, which ended with another gold medal with 37.37. This was Carter's fourth world title with the Jamaican team.

=== 2016 – failed anti-doping test ===
Carter failed an anti-doping test for the banned stimulant methylhexanamine when traces of the drug were found in Carter's A and B samples. This happened when 454 frozen blood and urine samples from the 2008 Summer Olympics in Beijing were retested by the International Olympic Committee.

As a result, on 25 January 2017, Jamaica team lost their gold from the 4 × 100 metres and thus resulting in Trinidad & Tobago being the new gold medalists from the 2008 Summer Olympics. Carter appealed, but an international sports tribunal upheld a ruling against him.

== Accomplishments and major competition results ==
=== Personal bests ===
Event	Location	Time
100 m	Rieti, Italy	9.78 s
200 m	Kingston, Jamaica	20.25 s

=== Competition record ===
==== Time progression in the 100 m ====
All information taken from World Athletics profile

Year	Time	Windspeed	City	Date
2003	11.01	1.5 m/s	Kingston	April 5
2004	10.56	2.0 m/s	Spanish Town	June 12
2005	10.59	−0.4 m/s	Kingston	March 18
2006	10.20	−1.6 m/s	Spanish Town	June 4
2007	10.11	1.0 m/s	Kingston	June 23
2008	9.98	1.0 m/s	Stockholm	July 22
2009	9.91	2.0 m/s	Shanghai	September 20
2010	9.78	0.9 m/s	Rieti	August 29
2011	9.89	1.3 m/s	Brussels	September 16
2012	9.95	1.5 m/s	Kingston	June 29
2013	9.87	1.8 m/s	Madrid	July 13
2014	9.96	2.0 m/s	Stockholm	August 21
2015	9.98	1.8 m/s	Kingston	May 9
2017	10.27	0.4 m/s	Kingston	May 20
2018	10.07	1.7 m/s	Barranquilla	July 30
2019	10.24	0.9 m/s	Kingston	June 8
2020	10.18	1.6 m/s	Kingston	July 25
2021	10.51	−1.8 m/s	Kingston	March 20

==== Time progression in the 200 m ====
Year	Time	Windspeed	City	Date
2004	21.10	1.4	Hamilton	April 11
2006	20.78	−0.5	Zurich	August 18
2008	20.31	1.1	Kingston	June 29
2011	20.25	1.6	Kingston	May 7

=== Track records ===
As of 6 September 2024, Carter holds the following track records for 100 metres.

Location	Time	Windspeed m/s	Date
Barranquilla	9.92	+2.1	29/07/2018
Madrid	9.87	+1.8	13/07/2013
Nottwil	9.86	+1.0	08/08/2010
