= Anyika Onuora =

British sprinter

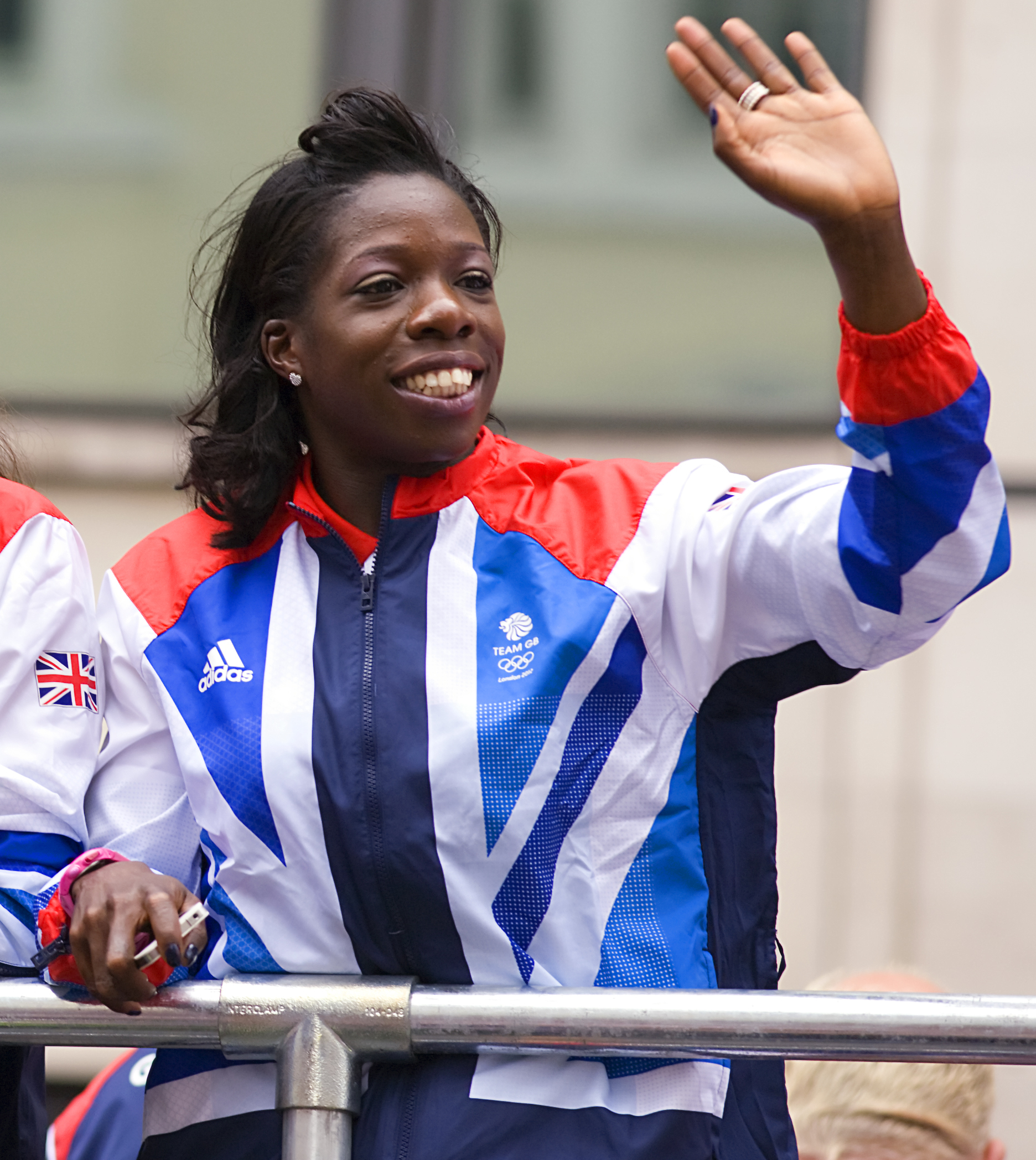
- Onuora at the Our Greatest Team Parade in 2012

Personal information
- Nationality: British (English)
- Born: 28 October 1984 (age 41) Liverpool, England
- Height: 1.78 m (5 ft 10 in)
- Weight: 76 kg (168 lb)

Sport
- Club: Liverpool Harriers
Medal record
Women's athletics
Representing Great Britain
Olympic Games
Bronze medal – third place	2016 Rio de Janeiro	4 × 400 m relay
World Championships
Bronze medal – third place	2015 Beijing	4 × 400 m relay
World Indoor Championships
Bronze medal – third place	2018 Birmingham	4 × 400 m
European Championships
Gold medal – first place	2014 Zurich	4 × 100 m relay
Gold medal – first place	2016 Amsterdam	4 × 400 m relay
Silver medal – second place	2006 Gothenburg	4 × 100 m relay
Bronze medal – third place	2016 Amsterdam	400 m
Bronze medal – third place	2018 Berlin	4 × 400 m relay
Representing England
Commonwealth Games
Silver medal – second place	2006 Melbourne	4 × 100 m relay
Bronze medal – third place	2014 Glasgow	4 × 100 m relay
Bronze medal – third place	2014 Glasgow	4 × 400 m relay

Anyika Onuora // (born 28 October 1984) is a British retired sprint track and field athlete who competed in the 100 metres, 200 metres and 400 metres, and also the 4 × 100 metres relay and 4 × 400 metres relay.

Specialising in the short sprints and sprint relays in her early career, and despite being part of the Great Britain 4 × 100 metres relay team that took gold at the 2014 European Athletics Championships, a move on her coaches suggestion to the longer 400 sprint and relay in her later career led to her most significant individual and relay successes. In the 4 × 400 metres relay, she won a World Championship bronze medal in 2015, while in 2016 an individual bronze in the 400 metres, and relay gold in the 4 × 400 metres relay at the European Championships were followed by an Olympic bronze medal in the 4 × 400 metres relay.

== Career ==
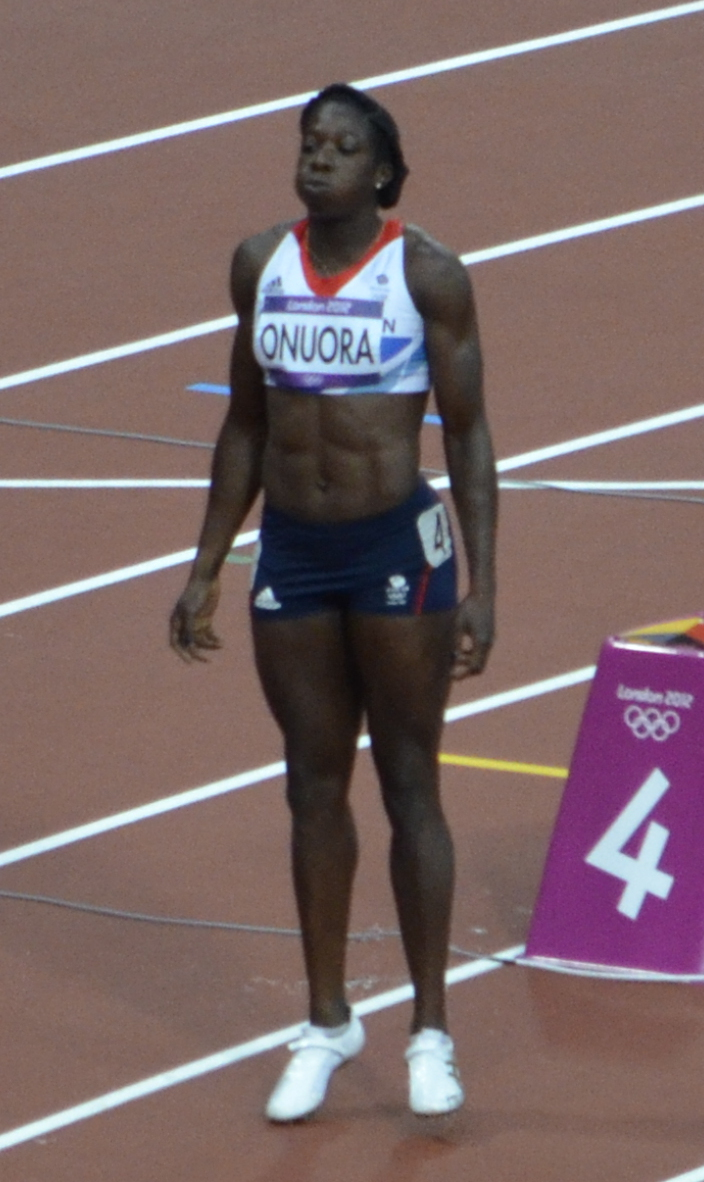
Onuora on track at the 2012 Summer Olympics

Her first major junior international competition was the 2003 European Athletics Junior Championships, where she finished fifth in the 100 m event and won a silver medal with the British 4 × 100 metres relay team. She competed in her first major senior tournaments in 2006: at the Melbourne Commonwealth Games she reached the semi-finals of the 100 m and won her second silver medal in the 4 × 100 m relay with the English team. Five months later at her first European Athletics Championships, she achieved the same feat again, reaching the individual semi-finals and taking another silver medal with the relay team. She also competed in the 2006 IAAF World Cup, representing Europe, but finished last, despite recording a season's best for the team. A technical lane mix-up with the United States team resulted in a poor performance for the British team and disqualification for the American team.

Onuora was chosen to represent Great Britain at the 2008 Beijing Olympics as a back-up runner in the relay team; however, ultimately she did not compete for the team.

She competed at the 2009 Manchester City Games in a 150 metres street race, winning the "B" final of the women's event.

On 28 August 2014, she helped set the British record in the Women's 4 × 100 m running the 3rd leg, alongside Asha Philip, Ashleigh Nelson and Desirèe Henry in the Diamond League in Zurich. This broke the British record set 11 days before at the 2014 European Athletics Championships.

She was a member of the bronze medal-winning British women's 4 × 400 metres relay team at the 2016 Rio Olympics.

== Personal life ==
She was born to Nigerian parents. She is the sister of former footballer Iffy Onuora and the academic Emy Onuora, author of the 2015 book Pitch Black, on the experiences of black British footballers.

Onuora graduated from Liverpool John Moores University in 2008 with a degree in economics.

In October 2015, 10 months before winning her bronze medal in Rio 2016, Onuora had become severely unwell from malaria after visiting her late father's home village in Nigeria. Few of her fellow GB athletes were aware that she had been unwell and could not walk due to illness, never mind train in preparation for the Rio Olympics selection trials. Despite this, she qualified for the Olympics, and by 2016 had recovered sufficiently to win gold and bronze medals in Amsterdam and Rio.

== Personal bests ==
Event	Best	Location	Date
60 metres	7.31 s	Bratislava, Slovakia	29 January 2006
100 metres	11.18 s	Zeulenroda, Germany	29 May 2011
200 metres	22.64 s	Glasgow, Great Britain	31 July 2014
400 metres	50.87 s	Beijing, China	25 August 2015

- All information taken from IAAF profile.
