= Saint Kitts and Nevis at the 1996 Summer Olympics =

- IOC code: SKN
- NOC: Saint Kitts and Nevis Olympic Committee
- Website: www.sknoc.org

in Atlanta
- Competitors: 10 in 1 sport
- Flag bearer: Diane Francis
- Medals: Gold 0 Silver 0 Bronze 0 Total 0

Summer Olympics appearances (overview)
- 1996; 2000; 2004; 2008; 2012; 2016; 2020; 2024; 2028

Saint Kitts and Nevis competed in the Olympic Games for the first time at the 1996 Summer Olympics in Atlanta, United States. The country sent ten athletes to compete, all in the sport of athletics. None of the athletes received a medal.

== Background ==
Saint Kitts and Nevis Amateur Athletics Association was formed in 1977 and joined the International Olympic Committee in 1993. Prior to the Olympics, Kim Collins earned a bronze medal at the CARIFTA Games in the men's under 20 category. During the 1995 IAAF World Championships, Ricardo Liddie and Kim Collins competed in the 4 x 100 relay, but did not advance past the first round.

== Competitors ==
The following is the list of number of competitors in the Games.

Sport	Men	Women	Total
Athletics	4	6	10
Total	4	6	10

== Athletics ==
Saint Kitts and Nevis sent ten competitors to the 1996 Olympic Games, the most ever for the country.

Kim Collins, the only man from St. Kitts and Nevis to compete in an individual event, competed in both the 100 m sprint and the 4 × 100 m relay at the age of 20. He finished the first heat of the 100 m sprint in third place with a time of 10.27, which was fast enough to qualify him for the quarterfinals. Collins ran a little slower in the second heat—finishing with a time of 10.34—which was not sufficient to qualify for the semifinals.

The men's 4 × 100 m relay team consisted of Ricardo Liddie, Bertram Haynes, Kim Collins, and Alain Maxime Isiah. They finished the first heat with a time of 40.12, garnering fourth place in the heat. This was not fast enough to advance to the next round, and they were eliminated from competition.

Diane Francis was the only woman to compete in an individual event, the 400 m. She finished the first heat with a time of 52.48, and placed fifth in the heat. With this time, she advanced to the quarterfinals. In the quarterfinals her time improved to 52.24, which was not high enough to advance to the semifinals.

Bernadeth Prentice, Bernice Morton, Elricia Francis, and Valma Bass competed in the 4 × 100 m relay. The team received a DNF (did not finish), and therefore did not advance to the next round of competition.

St. Kitts and Nevis also participated in the 4 × 400 m relay. Bernadeth Prentice, Diane Francis, Valma Bass, and Tamara Wigley competed in the 4 × 400 m relay. Three of the four athletes on the team also competed in other events at these Games. The group finished with a time of 3:35.12, garnering a seventh-place finish in their heat. They did not advance to the next round and were eliminated. Also Ayne Allen was a part of the 4x400 metres relay but was unable to run.

Key

- Note – Ranks given for track events are within the athlete's heat only
- Q = Qualified for the next round
- q = Qualified for the next round as a fastest loser or, in field events, by position without achieving the qualifying target
- NR = National record
- N/A = Round not applicable for the event
- Bye = Athlete not required to compete in round

Men

Athlete	Event	Heat		Quarterfinal		Semifinal		Final	
Athlete	Event	Result	Rank	Result	Rank	Result	Rank	Result	Rank
Kim Collins	100 m	10.27	3 Q	10.34	5	did not advance			
Ricardo Liddie; Bertram Haynes; Kim Collins; Alain Maxime Isiah	4 × 100 m relay	40.12	4	—N/a		did not advance			

Women

Athlete	Event	Heat		Quarterfinal		Semifinal		Final	
Athlete	Event	Result	Rank	Result	Rank	Result	Rank	Result	Rank
Diane Francis	400 m	52.48	5 q	52.24	7	did not advance			
Bernadeth Prentice; Bernice Morton; Elricia Francis; Valma Bass	4 × 100 m relay	did not finish		—N/a				did not advance	
Bernadeth Prentice; Diane Francis; Valma Bass; Tamara Wigley	4 × 400 m relay	3:35.12	7	—N/a				did not advance	
