= Saint Kitts and Nevis at the 2024 Summer Olympics =

- IOC code: SKN
- NOC: Saint Kitts and Nevis Olympic Committee
- Website: www.sknoc.org

in Paris, France 26 July 2024 – 11 August 2024
- Competitors: 3 (2 men and 1 woman) in 2 sports
- Flag bearers (opening): Naquille Harris; Zahria Allers-Liburd
- Flag bearer (closing): Naquille Harris
- Medals: Gold 0 Silver 0 Bronze 0 Total 0

Summer Olympics appearances (overview)
- 1996; 2000; 2004; 2008; 2012; 2016; 2020; 2024

Saint Kitts and Nevis competed at the 2024 Summer Olympics in Paris, France, from 26 July to 11 August 2024. This was the nation's eighth appearance at the Summer Olympics. The delegation consisted of three athletes: Naquille Harris and Zahria Allers-Liburd, who competed in athletics, and Troy Nisbett, who competed in swimming. The Saint Kitts and Nevis Olympic Committee was formed in 1986 and recognised by the IOC in 1993.

Saint Kitts and Nevis did not win any medals during the Paris Olympics. Harris won his preliminary race and advanced to the first round where he was eliminated. Allers-Liburd also won her preliminary race and advanced to the first round where she was eliminated. Nisbett placed 69th in his heats round and did not advance. Harris and Allers-Liburd were the flagbearers in the opening ceremony, and Harris was the flagbearer at the closing ceremony.

== Background ==
The Saint Kitts and Nevis Olympic Committee was formed on 27 May 1986 and recognised by the International Olympic Committee (IOC) in 1993. The appearance of Saint Kitts and Nevis at the Paris Summer Olympics marked their eighth consecutive summer appearance since it first entered the Games during the 1996 Summer Olympics. They debuted at the 1996 Olympic Games with 10 athletes, the most they have ever sent to the Games. Saint Kitts and Nevis has never won an Olympic medal. Sprinter Kim Collins was the first athlete from the country to reach the final round in an Olympic event in the 2000 Summer Olympics in Sydney, Australia. Collins reach the finals again in the 2004 and 2008 Summer Olympics. He is the only athlete from the country to reach an Olympic final round.

The 2024 Summer Olympics were held from 26 July to 11 August 2024 in Paris, France. Saint Kitts and Nevis sent a delegation of three athletes. Harris and Allers-Liburd were the flagbearers for Saint Kitts and Nevis in the opening ceremony, while Harris was the sole flagbearer at the closing ceremony.

== Competitors ==
The following is the list of number of competitors in the Games.

Sport	Men	Women	Total
Athletics	1	1	2
Swimming	1	0	1
Total	2	1	3

== Athletics ==
Saint Kitts and Nevis was represented by one male and one female athlete at the 2024 Summer Olympics in athletics: Naquille Harris in the men's 100 metres run and Zahria Allers-Liburd in the women's 100 metres run. Both qualified via universality place. This was Harris's debut appearance at the Olympics. On 3 August, he participated in the preliminaries of the men's 100 metres race in heat five. He finished the race in 10.33 seconds, first out of eight competitors in his heat, (Note: Including Dominique Lasconi Mulamba who was disqualified and didn't race) and advanced to the first round. In the first round, which also took place on 3 August, Harris was drawn into heat three. He finished the race with a time of 10.38 seconds, seventh out of nine athletes in his heat, and failed to advance to the semifinals. The gold medal was eventually won in 9.79 seconds by Noah Lyles of America; the silver was won by Kishane Thompson of Jamaica, and the bronze was earned by Fred Kerley of America.

Allers-Liburd made her debut appearance at this Olympics. On 2 August, she participated in the preliminaries of the women's 100 metres race in heat four. She finished the race in 11.73 seconds, first out of nine competitors in her heat, and advanced to the first round. The first round, which also took place on 2 August, Allers-Liburd was drawn into heat six. She finished the race with a time of 11.89 seconds, eight out of nine athletes in her heat, and failed to advance to the semifinals. The gold medal was won in 10.72 seconds by Julien Alfred of Saint Lucia, the silver by Sha'Carri Richardson of America, and the bronze by Melissa Jefferson of America.

Key

- Note–Ranks given for track events are within the athlete's heat only
- Q = Qualified for the next round

Track events

Athlete	Event	Preliminary		Heat		Semifinal		Final	
Athlete	Event	Result	Rank	Result	Rank	Result	Rank	Result	Rank
Naquille Harris	Men's 100 m	10.33	1 Q	10.38	7	Did not advance			
Zahria Allers-Liburd	Women's 100 m	11.73	1 Q	11.89	8	Did not advance			

== Swimming ==
Troy Nisbett qualified through a universality spot. Nisbett became the first swimmer to represent the country at the Olympics. He was also the youngest ever Olympian from Saint Kitts and Nevis.

Nisbett was making his debut appearance at the Olympics. On 1 August, he participated in the heats of the men's 50 metres freestyle, and was drawn into heat two. He finished the race in 28.71 seconds, 69th out of 74 total competitors, (Note: Including Shane Ryan who did not start) and failed to advance to the first round. The gold medal was eventually won in 21.25 seconds by Cameron McEvoy of Australia, the silver by Ben Proud of Great Britain, and the bronze by Florent Manaudou of France.

Athlete	Event	Heat		Semi-Final		Final	
Athlete	Event	Time	Rank	Time	Rank	Time	Rank
Troy Nisbett	Men's 50 m freestyle	28.71	69	Did not advance			

Qualifiers for the latter rounds (Q) of all events were decided on a time only basis, therefore positions shown are overall results versus competitors in all heats.

== See also ==
- Saint Kitts and Nevis at the 2023 Pan American Games
