= Saint Kitts and Nevis at the 2020 Summer Olympics =

- Flag of Saint Kitts and Nevis
- IOC code: SKN
- NOC: Saint Kitts and Nevis Olympic Committee
- Website: www.sknoc.org

in Tokyo, Japan 23 July 2021 – August 8, 2021
- Competitors: 2 in 1 sport
- Flag bearers (opening): Amya Clarke; Jason Rogers
- Flag bearer (closing): N/A
- Medals: Gold 0 Silver 0 Bronze 0 Total 0

Summer Olympics appearances (overview)
- 1996; 2000; 2004; 2008; 2012; 2016; 2020; 2024

Saint Kitts and Nevis competed at the 2020 Summer Olympics in Tokyo. Originally scheduled to take place from 24 July to 9 August 2020, the event was postponed to 23 July to 8 August 2021, because of the COVID-19 pandemic. This was the nation's seventh appearance at the Summer Olympics since their debut in 1996. The delegation consisted of two athletes, competing in athletic events; Jason Rogers and Amya Clarke. For the first time, in an effort to promote gender equality, two flagbearers, one male and one female were allowed at the Olympics. Both athletes from Saint Kitts and Nevis bore the national flag at the opening ceremony. Saint Kitts and Nevis did not win any medals during the Tokyo Olympics. Rogers ranked third in the first round of the men's 100 metres and advanced to the semifinals where he was eliminated. Clarke also ranked third in her preliminary round of the women's 100 metres and advanced to round 1 where she ranked 7th and was eliminated.

== Background ==
The Saint Kitts and Nevis Olympic Committee was first formed on 27 May 1986. The committee was recognised by the International Olympic Committee (IOC) in 1993 at a session of the IOC in Monte Carlo, Monaco. The appearance of Saint Kitts and Nevis at the Tokyo Summer Olympics marked their seventh consecutive summer appearance since it first entered the Games during the 1996 Summer Olympics. They debuted at the 1996 Olympic Games with 10 athletes, the most they have ever sent to the Games. Prior to the 2020 Olympics, Saint Kitts and Nevis had not won an Olympic medal. Sprinter Kim Collins, who competed at six Summer Olympics from 1996 to 2016, is the first athlete from the country to reach the final round in an Olympic event. He achieved it in the 2000 Summer Olympics in Sydney, Australia. Collins would go onto reach the finals again in the 2004 and 2008 Summer Olympics. He is currently the only athlete from the country to reach an Olympic final round.

The 2020 Summer Olympics were originally due to be held from 24 July to 9 August 2020, but were delayed to 23 July to 8 August 2021 due to the COVID-19 pandemic. For the 2020 Summer Olympics, Saint Kitts and Nevis sent a delegation of two athletes. The team at the 2020 Games featured two track and field athlete. Sprinter Jason Rogers participating in the men's 100 metres was making his third consecutive appearance at the Summer Olympics. 22 year old Amya Clarke was making her Olympic debut at the 2020 Games. She competed in the women's 100 metres. Both Clarke and Rogers were the flagbearers for Saint Kitts and Nevis in the opening ceremony. No athletes from Saint Kitts and Nevis were present for the closing ceremony due to COVID-19 related protocols that required athletes to leave Japan within 48 hours from completion of their final event.

== Athletics ==
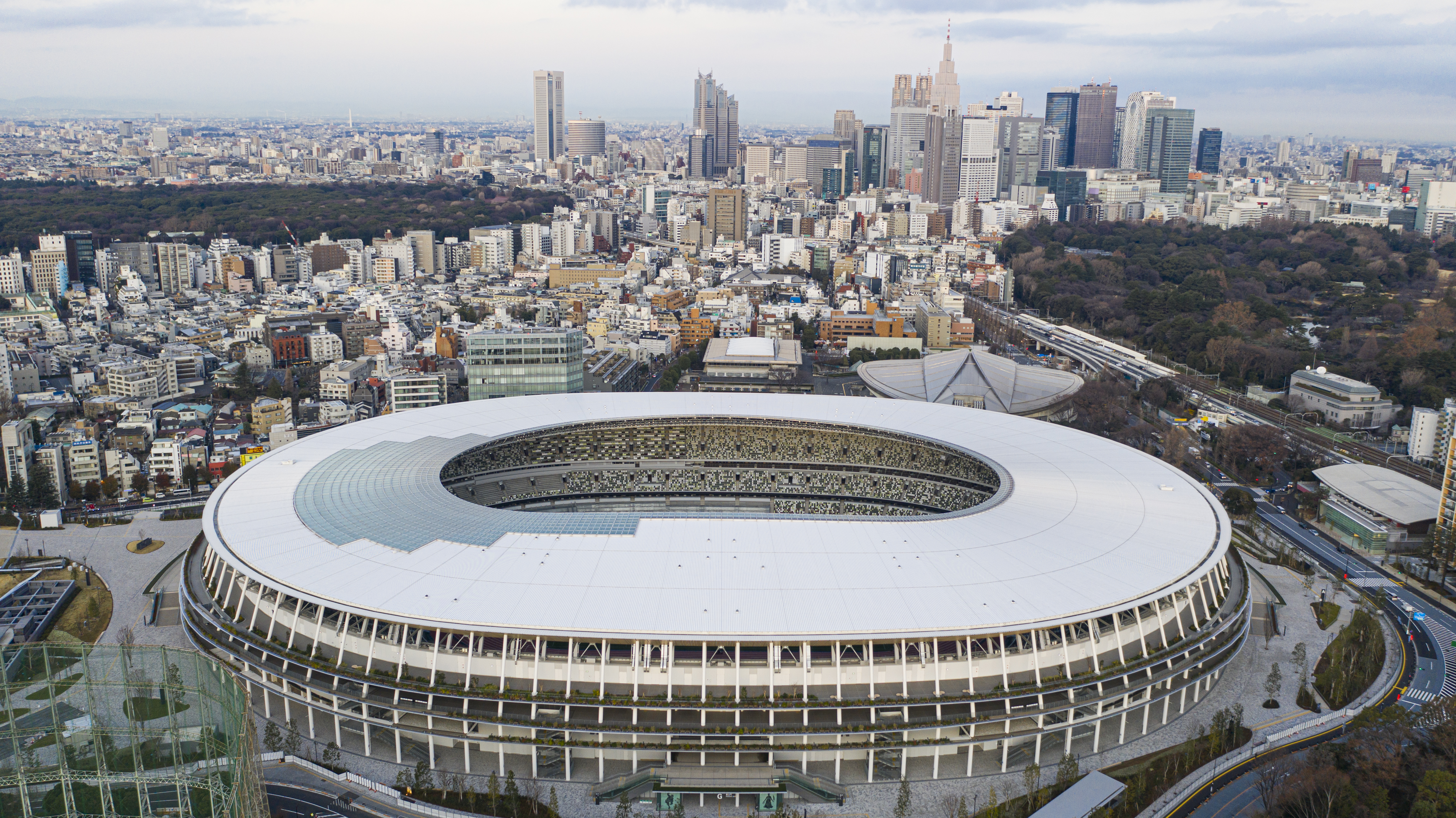
The Japan National Stadium, where the track and field events took place.

Athletes from Saint Kitts and Nevis achieved the entry standards for the games either by their qualifying time or by their world ranking. Up to a maximum of three athletes could compete in each track and field event.

Saint Kitts and Nevis was represented by one male and one female athlete at the 2020 Summer Olympics in athletics: Jason Rogers in the men's 100 metres run and Amya Clarke in the women's 100 metres run. This marked the third Olympic appearance for Rogers and the first Olympic appearance for Clarke.

Jason Rogers was making his third Olympic appearance, having previously represented Saint Kitts and Nevis at the 2012 Summer Olympics and 2016 Summer Olympics. On 31 July, he participated in the first round of the men's 100 metres race, and was drawn into heat four. He finished the race in 10.21 seconds, third out of nine competitors in his heat, and advanced to the semi-finals. (Note: One athlete, Mark Odhiambo, did not start.) In the semifinals, which took place on 1 August, Rogers was drawn into heat three. He finished the race with a time of 10.12 seconds, fifth out of eight athletes in his heat, and failed to advance to the finals. (Note: One athlete, CJ Ujah, was disqualified.) The gold medal was eventually won in 9.80 seconds by Marcell Jacobs of Italy; the silver was won by Fred Kerley of United States, and the bronze was earned by Andre De Grasse of Canada.

Amya Clarke was making her debut appearance at the Olympics. She participated in the women's 100 metres and was drawn into the first heat in the preliminary round. The preliminary round took place on 30 July and Clarke finished third out of nine athletes in her heat with a time of 11.67 seconds and advanced to round 1. She was drawn in heat four and finished with a time of 11.71 seconds. She finished last in her heat and did not advance to later rounds. (Note: One athlete, Vitória Cristina Rosa, did not start.) The medals in the event were won by athletes from Jamaica; gold was won by Elaine Thompson-Herah, silver by Shelly-Ann Fraser-Pryce and bronze by Shericka Jackson.

Key

- Note–Ranks given for track events are within the athlete's heat only
- Q = Qualified for the next round
- q = Qualified for the next round as a fastest loser or, in field events, by position without achieving the qualifying target
- NR = National record
- N/A = Round not applicable for the event
- Bye = Athlete not required to compete in round

Track & road events

Athlete	Event	Heat		Quarterfinal		Semifinal		Final	
Athlete	Event	Result	Rank	Result	Rank	Result	Rank	Result	Rank
Jason Rogers	Men's 100 m	Bye		10.21	3 Q	10.12	6	Did not advance	
Amya Clarke	Women's 100 m	11.67	3 Q	11.71	7	Did not advance			

== See also ==
- List of Saint Kitts and Nevis records in athletics
- Saint Kitts and Nevis at the Olympics
