= Saint Kitts and Nevis at the Olympics =

- IOC code: SKN
- NOC: Saint Kitts and Nevis Olympic Committee
- Website: www.sknoc.org
- Medals: Gold 0 Silver 0 Bronze 0 Total 0

Summer appearances
- 1996; 2000; 2004; 2008; 2012; 2016; 2020; 2024; 2028

Saint Kitts and Nevis first participated at the Olympic Games in 1996, and have competed in every Summer Olympic Games since then. The nation has not competed at the Winter Olympic Games.

Saint Kitts and Nevis have competed primarily in athletics, but in 2024 sent their first athlete to compete in swimming. The country has yet to win an Olympic medal. Its highest placement so far is 6th, achieved by sprinter Kim Collins at the men's 100 meters event at the 2004 Summer Olympics and the men's 200 meters event at the 2008 Summer Olympics.

== Olympic overview ==
=== 1996 Summer Olympics ===
The first year Saint Kitts and Nevis participated in the Olympics, they sent ten athletes, the most the country has ever sent. Kim Collins and Diane Francis both advanced to the quarterfinals of their events, in the 100 meter sprint and 400 meter dash respectively. They were both eliminated in the quarterfinals and did not advance to the semifinals.

The rest of Saint Kitts and Nevis' participants took part in relay races. The men's 4 × 100 relay team placed fourth in their heat with a time of 40.12 seconds, the women's 4 × 100 relay team received a DNF (did not finish), and the women's 4 × 400 relay team finished seventh in their heat with a time of 3:35.12 minutes. None of the relay teams advanced to the next round.

=== 2000 Summer Olympics ===
Saint Kitts and Nevis only sent one male and one female athlete to the 2000 Summer Olympics, who both performed well. Kim Collins advanced to the semifinals in both the 100 meter and 200 meter sprints, but was eliminated from the 200 meter sprints. He advanced to the finals of the 100 meter sprint and placed seventh, with a time of 10.17. Valma Bass advanced to the semifinals in the 100 meter and 200 meter sprints, but was eliminated from both.

=== 2004 Summer Olympics ===
For the second consecutive Olympics, Saint Kitts and Nevis sent one male and one female to compete in athletics at the 2004 Summer Olympics. Kim Collins once again made it to the finals of the 100 meter. He finished sixth in the 100 meter with a time of ten seconds. Collins was the oldest athlete to compete for Saint Kitts and Nevis at the age of 28. Tiandra Ponteen ran the 400 m dash, advancing to the semifinals. She finished fifth with a time of 51.33 seconds and did not advance to the finals.

=== 2008 Summer Olympics ===
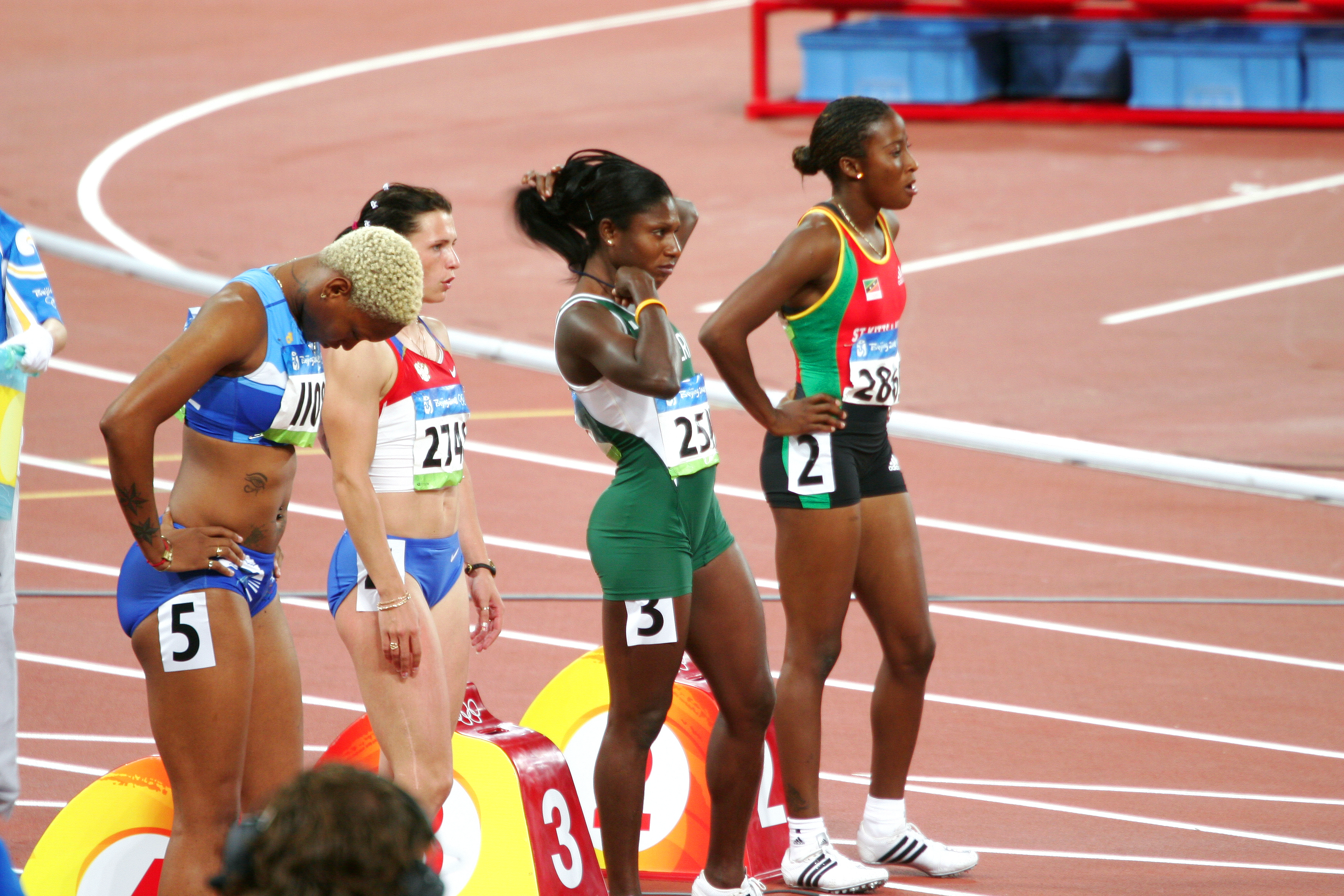
Hodge (right) in the first heat of the second round of the women's 100m sprint

Saint Kitts and Nevis sent one male and three female athletes to the 2008 Summer Olympics, who all competed in athletics. Kim Collins competed in two events, and was the only athlete from Saint Kitts and Nevis to advance to the finals. Collins finished in sixth place in the 200 meters, with a time of 20.59 seconds.

=== 2012 Summer Olympics ===
Saint Kitts and Nevis sent seven athletes to the 2012 Summer Olympics. One athlete, the sprinter Tameka Williams, admitted prior to competing in the London Games that she took Blast Off Red, which is typically used to increase the performance of horses and greyhounds. It was announced on July 29 that she would not compete. Kim Collins, who has competed in every Olympics that Saint Kitts and Nevis has participated in, was not allowed to compete by his Olympic committee. Collins was required to stay in the Olympic village, but instead stayed with his wife (who was also his coach), closer to the track. The committee said he had violated team rules, and did not allow him to compete.

The 4 × 100 meter relay team, made up of—Antoine Adams, Delwayne Delaney, Brijesh Lawrence, Jason Rogers, and Lestrod Roland—set a national record for Saint Kitts and Nevis with a time of 38.41 seconds. They placed sixth and did not advance to the next round.

=== 2016 Summer Olympics ===
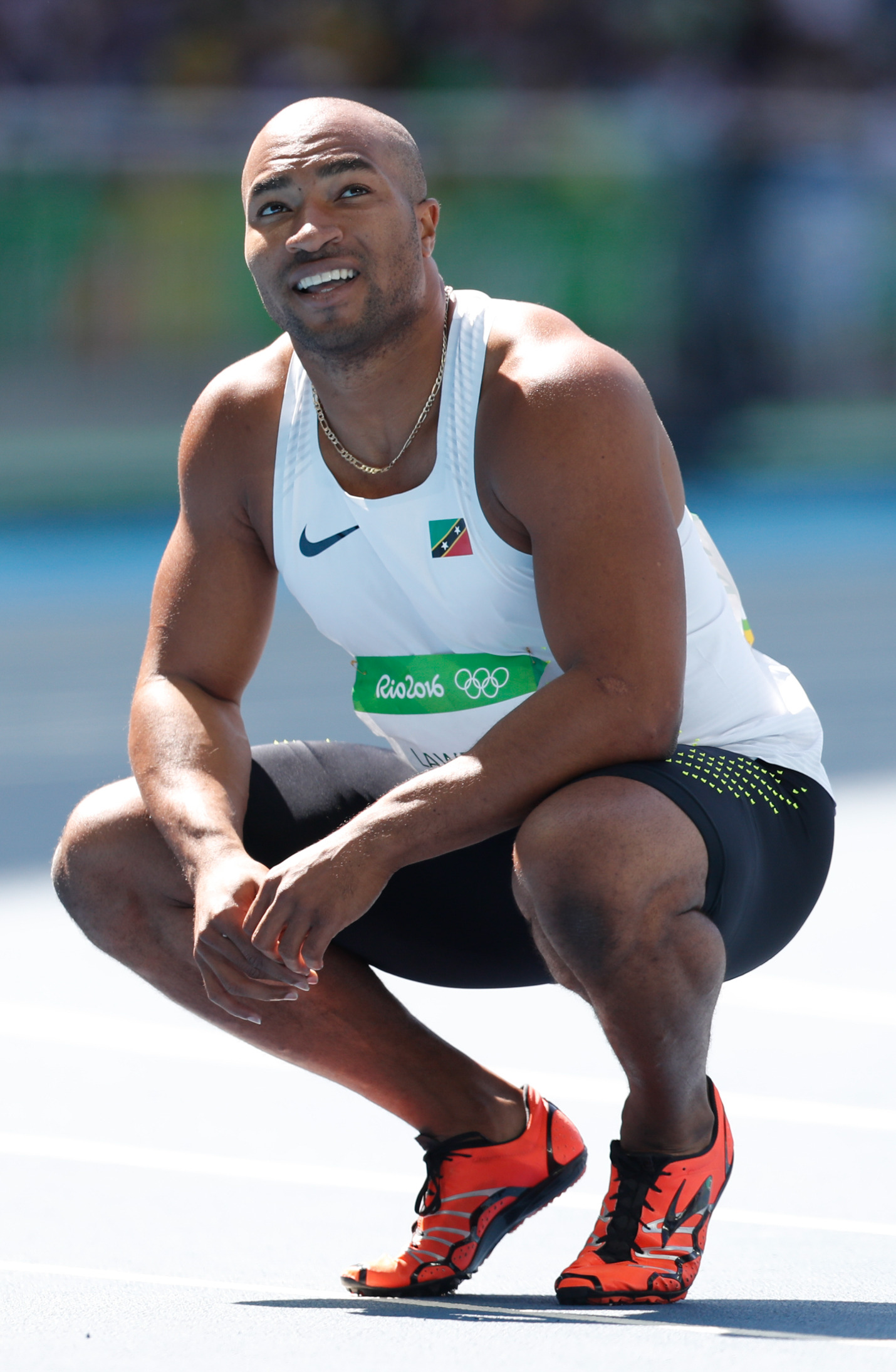
Brijesh Lawrence during the 100 meter sprint heats.

Saint Kitts and Nevis had seven participants at the 2016 Summer Olympics, led by team captain Antoine Adams. At 40 years old, Kim Collins was the first 40-year old to run a sub 10 second 100-meter dash, for his fifth consecutive Olympic Games. He was the oldest sprinter at these Games. Collins advanced the furthest of any Saint Kitts and Nevis athlete, reaching the semifinals of the 100 meter dash. He finished sixth in his heat with a time of 10.12 seconds and did not advance to the finals.

=== 2020 Summer Olympics ===
Saint Kitts and Nevis sent one male and one female athlete to compete in athletics at the 2020 Summer Olympics. Jason Rogers ran the 100 m sprint, advancing to the semifinals. He finished sixth with a time of 10.12 seconds and did not advance to the finals. Amya Clarke ran the 100 m sprint, advancing to round one. She finished seventh with a time of 11.71 seconds and did not advance to the next round.

=== 2024 Summer Olympics ===
Saint Kitts and Nevis sent two males and one female athlete to compete in athletics and swimming at the 2024 Summer Olympics. Naquille Harris ran the 100 m sprint. Placing seventh in the first-round heats, he did not advance to the semifinals. Zahria Allers-Liburd ran the 200 m sprint. Placing eighth in the first-round heats, she did not advance to the semifinals. Troy Nisbett became the first swimmer to represent Saint Kitts and Nevis at the Olympics, and the youngest ever Olympian from the country. In the heats he ranked 69th and did not advance to the semifinals.

== Medal tables ==
=== Medals by Summer Games ===
Games	Athletes	Gold	Silver	Bronze	Total	Rank
1996 Atlanta	10	0	0	0	0	–
2000 Sydney	2	0	0	0	0	–
2004 Athens	2	0	0	0	0	–
2008 Beijing	4	0	0	0	0	–
2012 London	7	0	0	0	0	–
2016 Rio de Janeiro	7	0	0	0	0	–
2020 Tokyo	2	0	0	0	0	–
2024 Paris	3	0	0	0	0	–
2028 Los Angeles	future event					
2032 Brisbane	future event					
Total		0	0	0	0	–

== Flagbearers ==
Summer Olympics
Games	Athlete	Sport
1996 Atlanta	Diane Francis	Athletics
2000 Sydney	Kim Collins	Athletics
2004 Athens	Kim Collins	Athletics
2008 Beijing	Virgil Hodge	Athletics
2012 London	Kim Collins	Athletics
2016 Rio de Janeiro	Antoine Adams	Athletics
2020 Tokyo	Amya Clarke	Athletics
2020 Tokyo	Jason Rogers	Athletics
2024 Paris	Naqille Harris	Athletics
2024 Paris	Zahria Allers-Liburd	Athletics

== See also ==
- Saint Kitts and Nevis national athletics team
