= Saint Kitts and Nevis at the 2008 Summer Olympics =

- IOC code: SKN
- NOC: Saint Kitts and Nevis Olympic Committee
- Website: www.sknoc.org

in Beijing
- Competitors: 4 in 1 sports
- Flag bearer: Virgil Hodge
- Medals: Gold 0 Silver 0 Bronze 0 Total 0

Summer Olympics appearances (overview)
- 1996; 2000; 2004; 2008; 2012; 2016; 2020; 2024

The Saint Kitts and Nevis National Olympic Committee sent four athletes to the 2008 Summer Olympics in Beijing, China. All four participated in the track and field competitions across four different events. Three women (Tiandra Ponteen, Virgil Hodge, and Meritzer Williams) and one man (Kim Collins) comprised the Kittitian delegation. Williams and Ponteen did not advance past Qualifications in their events; Hodge reached quarterfinals in both the 100m and 200m sprints; and Collins, who participated in two events, reached the Semifinal round in the 100m sprint, and ranked sixth in the finals in the 200m sprint. Saint Kitts and Nevis did not win any medals during the Beijing Olympics. The flag bearer for the team at the opening ceremony was first-time Olympian Virgil Hodge.

== Background ==
The appearance of Saint Kitts and Nevis at the Beijing Summer Olympics marked its fourth consecutive summer appearance since it first entered the Games during the 1996 Summer Olympics. Saint Kitts' and Nevis' delegation to the 2008 Olympics included four athletes: Kim Collins, Virgil Hodge, Tiandra Ponteen, and Meritzer Williams. All four participated in track and field-related events. Of the four, two (Ponteen and Collins) represented the country previously in the 2004 Summer Olympics in Athens. The 2008 Games marked Williams as the youngest Kittitian yet to participate on behalf of her country, and Collins the oldest. Virgil Hodge was Saint Kitts' and Nevis' flagbearer. As a result of Collins' achievements in his events, the Kim Collins Pavilion was christened for him in the then newly created Silver Jubilee Athletic Stadium.

== Athletics ==
=== Men's 100m sprint ===
Kim Collins was the only Kittitian participant in the men's 100m sprint, which began its Qualifications round on 14 August. Collins, who was placed in heat two, ranked second in the event with a time of 10.17 seconds. Collins was 0.01 seconds slower than Asafa Powell of Jamaica, who was the fastest in Collins' heat. Overall, Kim Collins ranked fourth out of 80 athletes and was 0.04 seconds slower than Tyrone Edgar of the United Kingdom, who ranked first in qualifications overall.

In the 15 August Quarterfinals, Collins was placed in heat three and, with a time of 10.07, ranked second in his heat behind Marc Burns of Trinidad and Tobago. Burns was 0.02 seconds faster than Collins during Quarterfinals. Overall, Collins ranked 7th out of 40 athletes. His time was within 0.15 seconds of Jamaica's Usain Bolt, who held the fastest time during quarterfinals. Collins progressed to semifinals.

Kim Collins ran the 100 meter sprint during Quarterfinals in 10.05 seconds. Participating in heat one, Collins ranked fifth. Overall, Collins tied American sprinter Tyson Gay for ninth place out of 16, and did not progress to finals.

=== Men's 200m sprint ===
Kim Collins participated in the men's 200m dash. During the 17 August qualifications, Collins raced in heat three, placing second out of eight people. With a time of 20.55 seconds, Collins fell 0.06 seconds short of the United Kingdom's Marlon Devonish, who was the fastest in his heat; and was 0.3 seconds faster than Jamaica's Marvin Anderson, who took third place in the heat. Overall, Collins ranked seventh out of 62 athletes during the qualification round, falling 0.11 seconds short of American finalist Wallace Spearmon, who ranked third overall, and 0.3 seconds short of Zimbabwean finalist Brian Dzingai, who ranked first overall. Collins continued to quarterfinals.

During the 18 August quarterfinals, Collins raced American Shawn Crawford and Jamaican Usain Bolt, among others, in heat one. He placed third, after the two athletes, with a time of 20.43 seconds, tying with Devonish. Collins ranked 12th out of 31 athletes, ranking immediately behind Churandy Martina of the Netherlands Antilles. Collins qualified for semifinals.

During semifinals, Collins was placed in heat two. With a time of 20.25, he ranked fourth out of seven in his heat, defeating Devonish; Mauritius' Stephan Buckland; and Antigua and Barbuda's Brendan Christian. He was slower than Spearmon, Crawford, and Bolt. Collins ranked seventh overall, tying with Christian Malcolm of the United Kingdom, and moved on to finals.

Kim Collins finished eighth in the Finals, but his position was shifted up to sixth place after the disqualifications of Martina and Spearmon, who would have respectively taken the silver and bronze medals. Collins ranked immediately behind Christian Malcolm.

=== Women's 100m sprint ===
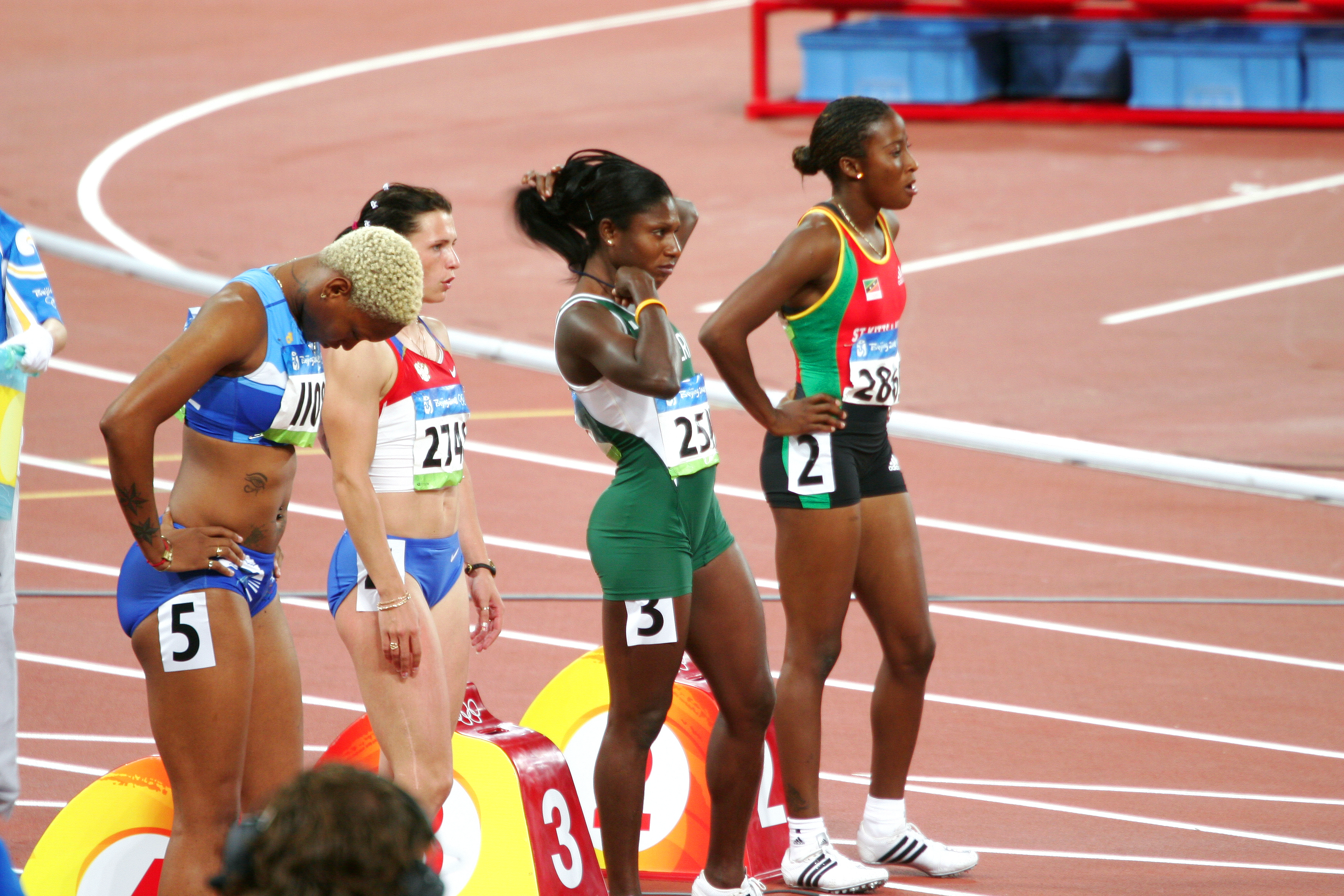
Hodge (right) in the first heat of the second round of the women's 100m sprint

Virgil Hodge was the only Kittitian to participate in the women's 100m sprint. She was placed in heat three during the qualification round on 15 August. Hodge was the fourth fastest person in her heat, completing the sprint in 11.48 seconds. She fell 0.04 seconds short of Uzbekistan's Guzel Khubbieva, who ranked third in the heat; and 0.15 seconds short of the United States' Muna Lee, who ranked first in her heat during the qualification round. Overall in the event, Virgil Hodge tied Jamaica's Sherone Simpson for 28th place out of 85 sprinters, and progressed to the next round.

Hodge competed during quarterfinals, in which she was placed in Heat 1. Hodge, again, ranked fourth in her heat of eight people, completing the sprint in 11.45 seconds. Hodge was 0.13 seconds slower than Jeanette Kwakye of the United Kingdom, who ranked third place in the heat, and 0.39 seconds slower than Shelly-Ann Frazer of Jamaica, who was the fastest in the heat; she was also 0.23 seconds faster than Jade Latoya Bailey of Barbados, who was the slowest runner in her heat. Overall, Hodge tied Norwegian sprinter Ezinne Okparaebo for 23rd place out of 40 sprinters. She did not progress to semifinals.

=== Women's 200m sprint ===
Meritzer Williams and Virgil Hodge participated in the women's 200 meters sprint. During the 18 August Qualifications, Hodge was placed in heat one, and Williams in heat three. Hodge ranked third in her heat, earning a time of 23.14 seconds, falling behind Susanthika Jayasinghe of Sri Lanka and Allyson Felix of the United States. Felix, who ranked first and later became silver medalist, was 0.12 seconds faster than Hodge in this round. Meritzer Williams earned a time of 23.83 seconds in her round, ranking seventh of eight in her heat, just ahead of eighth-place runner Benin's Fabienne Fereaz. American runner Marshevet Hooker, who ranked first in Williams' heat and later took fifth place in finals, was 0.76 seconds faster than Meritzer Williams.

Overall in the first qualifying round, Virgil Hodge ranked 18th out of 46. Meritzer Williams ranked 38th. Meritzer Williams did not advance to quarterfinals, but Hodge did.

Virgil Hodge was placed in heat four, competing against athletes like Jamaica's Sherone Simpson and the United States' Muna Lee. She ran her event in 23.17 seconds, earning fifth of eight in her heat and falling 0.02 seconds behind Bulgaria's Ivet Lalova. Overall, however, Hodge raked 19th out of 31. Hodge fell short of Simpson, who ranked first in quarterfinals, by 0.57 seconds.

=== Women's 400m sprint ===
Tiandra "Angie" Ponteen participated in the women's 400m sprint. She was the only Kittitian to participate in the event at the Beijing Olympics. Ponteen was placed in the first heat of her qualifying round, which took place on 16 August. She ran the 400 meters in 52.41 seconds, a full second behind American runner DeeDee Trotter, finishing fifth out of seven in her heat. Overall, Tiandra Ponteen ranked 27th out of 50 runners. She did not progress to further rounds. Ponteen was 1.87 seconds slower than bronze medalist Sanya Richards of the United States, who ranked first in the 16 August Round 1 qualifying round.

=== Summary ===
Men

Athlete	Event	Heat		Quarterfinal		Semifinal		Final	
Athlete	Event	Result	Rank	Result	Rank	Result	Rank	Result	Rank
Kim Collins	100 m	10.17	2 Q	10.01	2 Q	10.05	5	Did not advance	
Kim Collins	200 m	20.55	2 Q	20.43	3 Q	20.25	4 Q	20.59	6

Women

Athlete	Event	Heat		Quarterfinal		Semifinal		Final	
Athlete	Event	Result	Rank	Result	Rank	Result	Rank	Result	Rank
Virgil Hodge	100 m	11.48	4 q	11.45	4	Did not advance			
Virgil Hodge	200 m	23.14	3 Q	23.17	5	Did not advance			
Meritzer Williams	200 m	23.83	7	Did not advance					
Tiandra Ponteen	400 m	52.41	5	—N/a		Did not advance			

Key

- Note–Ranks given for track events are within the athlete's heat only
- Q = Qualified for the next round
- q = Qualified for the next round as a fastest loser or, in field events, by position without achieving the qualifying target
- NR = National record
- N/A = Round not applicable for the event
- Bye = Athlete not required to compete in round

== See also ==
- Saint Kitts and Nevis at the 2007 Pan American Games
- Saint Kitts and Nevis at the 2010 Central American and Caribbean Games
