= Saint Kitts and Nevis at the 2004 Summer Olympics =

- IOC code: SKN
- NOC: Saint Kitts and Nevis Olympic Committee
- Website: www.sknoc.org

in Athens
- Competitors: 2 in 1 sport
- Flag bearer: Kim Collins
- Medals: Gold 0 Silver 0 Bronze 0 Total 0

Summer Olympics appearances (overview)
- 1996; 2000; 2004; 2008; 2012; 2016; 2020; 2024

Saint Kitts and Nevis took part in the 2004 Summer Olympics, which were held in Athens, Greece, from August 13 to 29. The country's participation at Athens marked its third appearance at the Summer Olympics. The delegation included two track and field athletes: Kim Collins in the men's 100 meters, and Tiandra Ponteen in the women's 400 meters.

== Background ==
Saint Kitts and Nevis made its Olympic debut at the 1996 Summer Olympics in Atlanta, United States sending 10 athletes. The 2004 summer games marked the nation's third olympic appearance. Kim Collins, who competed in the men's 100 meters, had previously competed in both the 1996 and 2000 Summer Games.

The Saint Kitts and Nevis Olympic Committee was first formed on May 27, 1986. The committee gained recognition by the International Olympic Committee (IOC) in 1993 at a session of the IOC in Monte Carlo, Monaco.

== Athletics ==
Saint Kitts and Nevis was represented by one male and one female athlete at the 2004 Summer Olympics in athletics: Kim Collins in the men's 100 meter run and Tiandra Ponteen in the women's 400 meters run. This marked the third Olympic appearance for Collins and the first Olympic appearance for Ponteen.

Kim Collins was the only male athlete competing for Saint Kitts and Nevis at the 2004 Summer Olympics and competed in the men's 100 meters. Collins finished sixth out of the eighty-two athletes that competed in the event. The medals in the event went to athletes from the United States and Portugal.

Tiandra Ponteen was the only female athlete competing for Saint Kitts and Nevis at the 2004 Summer Olympics, and competed in the women's 400 meters. Ponteen finished fourth in her heat, and fifth in the semi-finals for the event. The medals in the event went to athletes from the Bahamas, Mexico, and Russia.

Key

- Note–Ranks given for track events are within the athlete's heat only
- Q = Qualified for the next round
- q = Qualified for the next round as a fastest loser or, in field events, by position without achieving the qualifying target
- NR = National record
- N/A = Round not applicable for the event
- Bye = Athlete not required to compete in round

Men

Athlete	Event	Heat		Quarterfinal		Semifinal		Final	
Athlete	Event	Result	Rank	Result	Rank	Result	Rank	Result	Rank
Kim Collins	100 m	10.11	1 Q	10.05	2 Q	10.02	4 Q	10.00	6

Women

Athlete	Event	Heat		Semifinal		Final	
Athlete	Event	Result	Rank	Result	Rank	Result	Rank
Tiandra Ponteen	400 m	51.17	4 q	51.33	5	did not advance	
