= Saint Kitts and Nevis at the 2016 Summer Olympics =

- IOC code: SKN
- NOC: Saint Kitts and Nevis Olympic Committee
- Website: www.sknoc.org

in Rio de Janeiro
- Competitors: 7 in 1 sport
- Flag bearer: Antoine Adams
- Medals: Gold 0 Silver 0 Bronze 0 Total 0

Summer Olympics appearances (overview)
- 1996; 2000; 2004; 2008; 2012; 2016; 2020; 2024

Saint Kitts and Nevis competed at the 2016 Summer Olympics in Rio de Janeiro, from August 5 to 21, 2016. This was the nation's sixth consecutive appearance at the Summer Olympics.

The St. Kitts and Nevis Olympic Committee sent the nation's largest delegation to the Games since its debut in 1996, due to the participation of the men's 4 × 100 m relay squad. A total of seven athletes, six men and one woman, were selected to the Saint Kitts and Nevis team, competing only in the track and field event. The most notable of the roster was Kim Collins, who was the first athlete from Saint Kitts and Nevis to participate in five Olympic Games. Meanwhile, sprinter Antoine Adams, the most experienced Olympian returning from London 2012, served as the nation's team captain and flag bearer in the opening ceremony. St. Kitts and Nevis, however, has yet to win its first ever Olympic medal.

== Background ==
The appearance of Saint Kitts and Nevis at the Rio Summer Olympics marked its sixth consecutive summer appearance since it first entered the Games during the 1996 Summer Olympics. Antoine Adams was the St. Kitts and Nevis' flag bearer for these Games. They debuted at the 1996 Olympic Games with 10 athletes, the most they have ever sent to the Games.

== Athletics ==
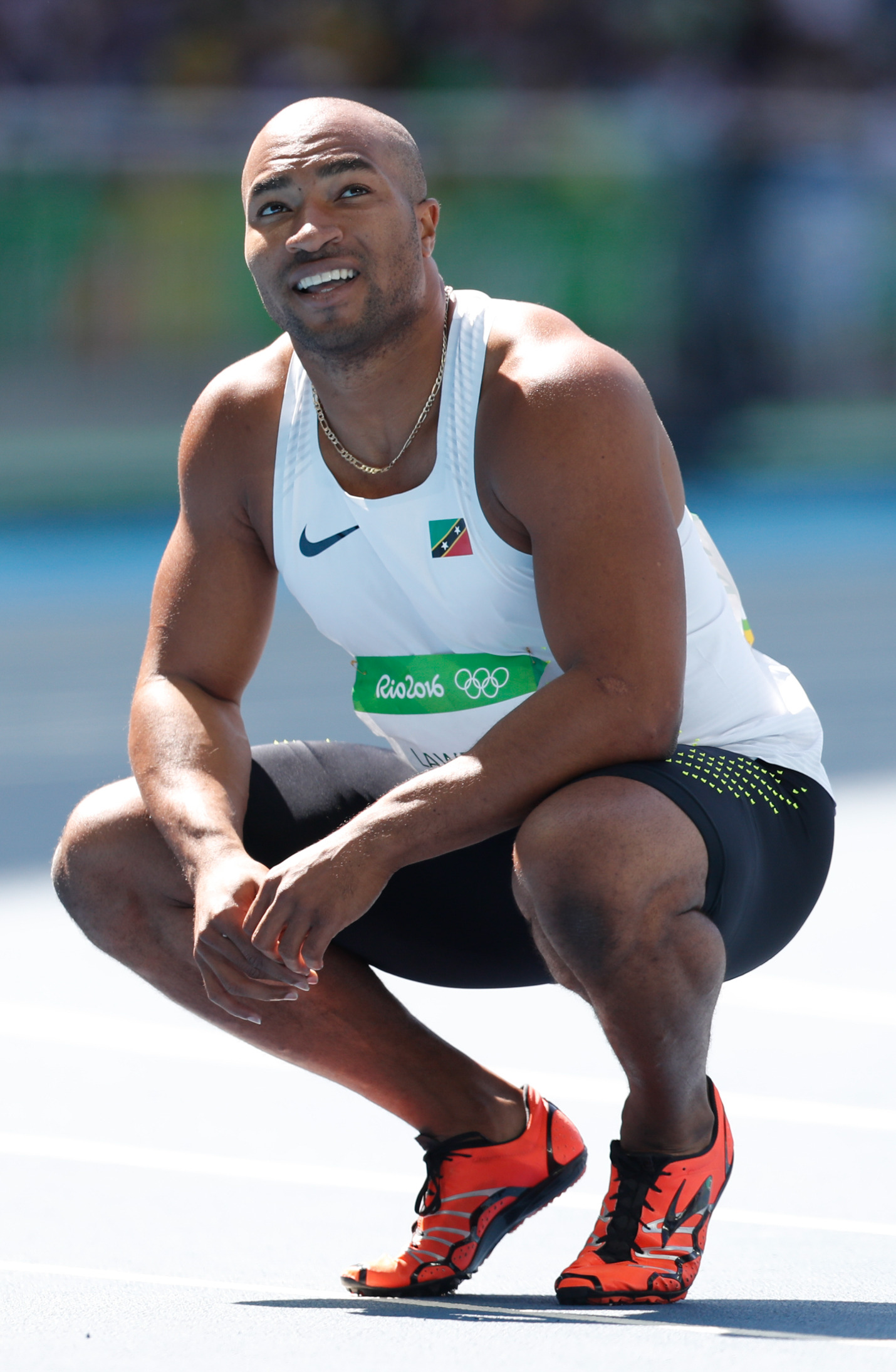
Brijesh Lawrence during the 100 m sprint heats

All of Saint Kitts and Nevis athletes competed in the sport of athletics. The country had three competitors in the men's 100 m sprint, one in the men's 200 m sprint, a men's 4 × 100 m relay team, and one competitor in the women's 200 m sprint.

Antoine Adams was the flagbearer for Saint Kitts and Nevis. He competed in three events, and did not advance past the first round in any of them. He qualified for the men's 100 m sprint on June 13, 2015, by finishing with a time of 10.03. The maximum allowed time to qualify was 10.16. He finished his heat with a time of 10.39, placing eighth and last, failing to advance to the next round. Adams qualified for the 200 m sprint with a time of 20.38; the maximum time allowed was 20.50. In the event at Rio, Adams finished in fifth with a time of 20.49. He did not advance to the next round.

Kim Collins competed in his fifth consecutive Olympic Games, and was the oldest sprinter at these Games. While most sprinters peak in their 20s, Collins set his personal record after reaching the age of 40, and became the first individual to run a sub-10 second 100 m dash in the process. He ran a 9.93 100 m dash, which was fast enough to qualify for Rio. He competed in both the 100 m sprint and 4 × 100 m relay. Collins was the only St. Kitts and Nevis athlete to make it out of the first round. He finished his heat with a time of 10.18 and fourth place. He improved his time in the semifinals, finishing with a time of 10.12. This put him in sixth place and he did not advance to the finals.

Brijesh Lawrence qualified for the 100 m dash with a time of 10.15. At Rio, he finished as the slowest of the three St. Kitts and Nevis 100 m sprinters, with a time of 10.55. He finished eighth in his heat, which did not qualify him for the next round.

Jason Rogers, one of the relay team members, missed qualifying for the Olympics when he finished with a time of 10.17 for the 100 m dash.

The 4 × 100 m relay team—consisting of Antoine Adams, Allistar Clarke, Kim Collins, and Jason Rogers—qualified with a time of 38.76. The qualification times for relay times are an average of the two best times for the team. In the 4 × 100 meter relay, Saint Kitts and Nevis finished with the slowest time in either heat, placing ahead of the Dominican Republic.

Tameka Williams, the sole woman representative for Saint Kitts and Nevis, competed in the 200 m sprint. She qualified but did not participate in the 2012 Olympics after she voluntarily told her officials she had taken a banned substance. Williams missed qualifying for the 100 m dash; the time required was 11.32, and her best time was 11.33. She did qualify for the 200 m sprint with a time of 23.05; the required time was 23.20. She finished sixth in her heat with a time of 23.61 and did not advance to the next round.

Key

- Note: Ranks given for track events are within the athlete's heat only
- Q = Qualified for the next round
- q = Qualified for the next round as a fastest loser or, in field events, by position without achieving the qualifying target
- NR = National record
- N/A = Round not applicable for the event
- Bye = Athlete not required to compete in round

Track & road events

Athlete	Event	Heat		Quarterfinal		Semifinal		Final		Notes
Athlete	Event	Result	Rank	Result	Rank	Result	Rank	Result	Rank	Notes
Antoine Adams	Men's 100 m	Bye		10.39	8	did not advance				
Kim Collins	Men's 100 m	Bye		10.18	4 q	10.12	6	did not advance		
Brijesh Lawrence	Men's 100 m	Bye		10.55	8	did not advance				
Antoine Adams	Men's 200 m	20.49	5	—N/a		did not advance				
Antoine Adams; Allistar Clarke; Kim Collins; Jason Rogers	Men's 4 × 100 m relay	39.81	7	—N/a				did not advance		
Tameka Williams	Women's 200 m	23.61	6	—N/a		did not advance				

== See also ==
- Saint Kitts and Nevis at the 2015 Pan American Games
