= Saint Kitts and Nevis at the 2000 Summer Olympics =

- IOC code: SKN
- NOC: Saint Kitts and Nevis Olympic Committee
- Website: www.sknoc.org

in Sydney
- Competitors: 2 in 1 sport
- Flag bearer: Kim Collins
- Medals: Gold 0 Silver 0 Bronze 0 Total 0

Summer Olympics appearances (overview)
- 1996; 2000; 2004; 2008; 2012; 2016; 2020; 2024

Saint Kitts and Nevis took part in the 2000 Summer Olympics, which were held in Sydney, Australia, from September 13 to October 1. The country's participation marked its second appearance at the Summer Olympics since its debut at the 1996 Summer Olympics in Atlanta. The delegation included two track and field athletes: Kim Collins and Valma Bass.

== Background ==
Saint Kitts and Nevis participated in three Olympics between its Olympic debut at the 1996 games in Atlanta, United States, and the 2000 Summer Olympics in Sydney, Australia. Saint Kitts and Nevis made their first appearance at the Olympics in 1996, sending ten athletes. Kim Collins previously competed at the 1996 Summer Olympics in both the men's 100 meters and the men's 4 × 100 meters relay. Valma Bass previously partook in the 1996 Summer Olympics in the women's 4 × 100 meters relay.

The Saint Kitts and Nevis Olympic Committee was first formed on May 27, 1986. The committee gained recognition by the International Olympic Committee in 1993 at a session of the IOC in Monte Carlo, Monaco.

== Competitors ==
The following is the list of number of competitors in the Games.

Sport	Men	Women	Total
Athletics	1	1	2
Total	1	1	2

== Athletics ==
Saint Kitts and Nevis was represented by one male and one female athlete at the 2000 Summer Olympics in athletics: Kim Collins in both the men's 100 and 200 meter runs and Valma Bass in both the women's 100 and 200 meter runs. This was the second Olympic appearance for both Collins and Bass; both athletes had previously competed at the 1996 Summer Olympics.

Collins competed in both the 100 meter and 200 meter dashes. Collins finished seventh out of ninety-seven athletes that competed in the 100 meter event. The medals in the 100 meter event went to athletes from the United States, Trinidad and Tobago, and Barbados. Collins placed fifth in the semifinals for the 200 meter event, and thus failed to advance to the finals. The medals in the 200 meter event went to athletes from Greece, Great Britain, and Trinidad and Tobago.

Bass competed in both the 100 and 200 meter sprints. Bass finished seventh in the semifinals for the 100 meter event, and eighth in the semifinals for the 200 meter sprint. She failed to advance in both rounds. The medals in the 100 meter event went to athletes from Greece and Jamaica. In the 200 meter event, athletes from the Bahamas, Sri Lanka, and Jamaica received medals.

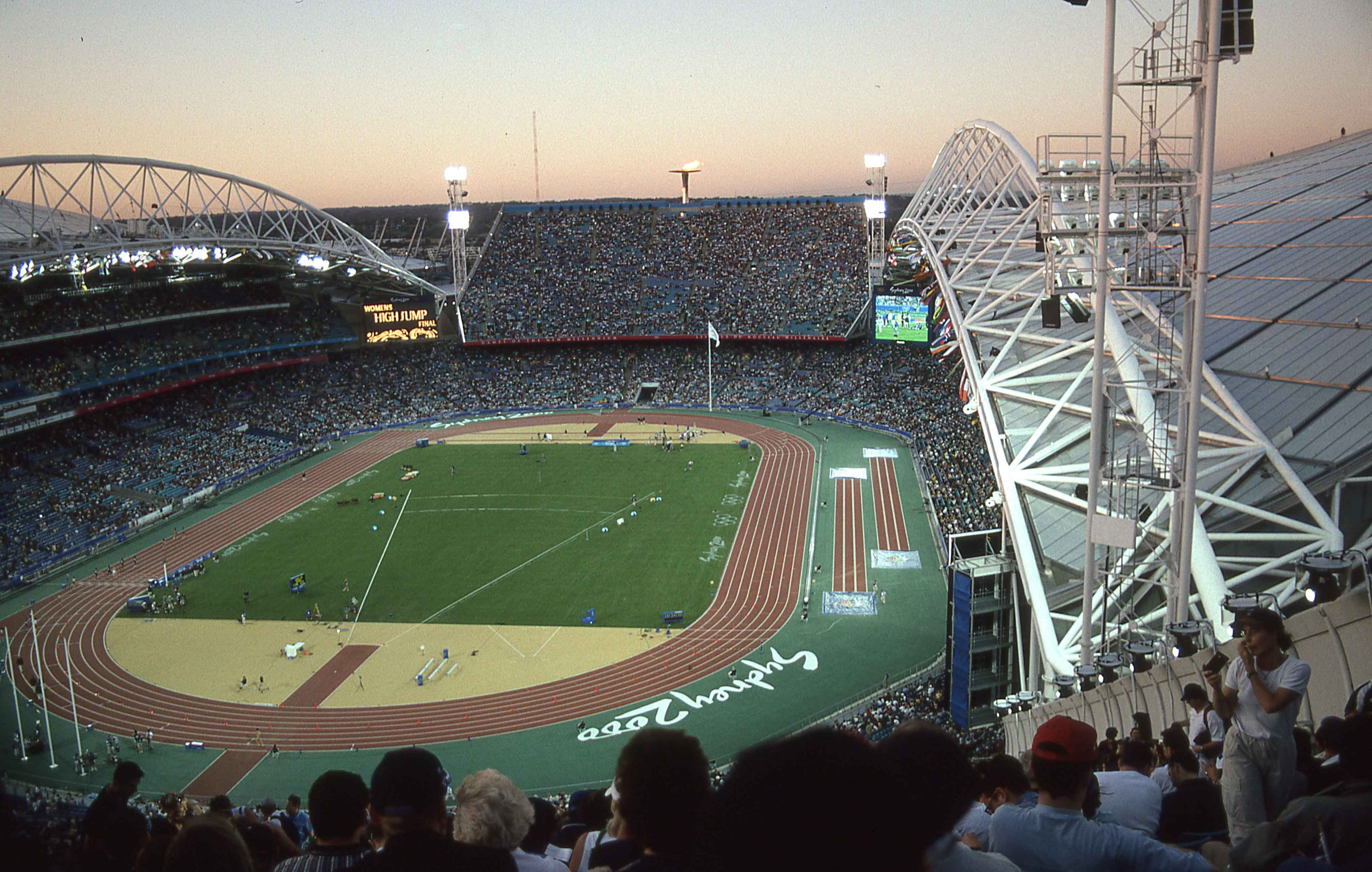
Stadium Australia where both Bass and Collins competed in athletics

Key

- Note–Ranks given for track events are within the athlete's heat only
- Q = Qualified for the next round
- q = Qualified for the next round as a fastest loser or, in field events, by position without achieving the qualifying target
- NR = National record
- N/A = Round not applicable for the event
- Bye = Athlete not required to compete in round

Men

Athlete	Event	Heat		Quarterfinal		Semifinal		Final		Notes
Athlete	Event	Result	Rank	Result	Rank	Result	Rank	Result	Rank	Notes
Kim Collins	100 m	10.39	2 Q	10.19	2 Q	10.20	4 Q	10.17	7	
Kim Collins	200 m	20.52	2 Q	20.47	3 Q	20.57	5	did not advance		

Women

Athlete	Event	Heat		Semifinal		Final		Notes
Athlete	Event	Result	Rank	Result	Rank	Result	Rank	Notes
Valma Bass	100 m	11.45	3 Q	11.60	7	did not advance		
Valma Bass	200 m	23.37	4Q	23.57	8	did not advance		
