= 2010–2012 NORCECA Beach Volleyball Continental Cup =

The North American zone see the zones divided into two Caribbean, Central and Central American zones. The two Caribbean zones will meet and then go up against the Central American zone in the inter-zonal tournaments. Both Caribbean zones will have an elimination bracket where two teams per country competing in a two-game series, if there is a tie a fifth game will be played by both countries. In the second round of the bracket the series will be a best of three. The winner and runner up of the main bracket and of the repechage will advance to the next round. The winner of the 2010–12 Continental Beach Volleyball Cup will advance to the Olympics. 29 out of 31 possible nations entered plus two non-IOC members (Anguilla and Curaçao) entered both the men's and women's tournaments.

== Men ==
=== Did not enter ===
- Bermuda
- Haiti

=== Zonal ===
==== EVCA ====
This zonal tournament was held in St. John's, Antigua and Barbuda, in November 2010.

Quarterfinals
1	Saint Kitts and Nevis	4
8	Saint Vincent and the Grenadines	0
4	Dominica	4
5	Anguilla	0
3	Antigua and Barbuda	3
6	Grenada	1
7	British Virgin Islands	1
2	Saint Lucia	3

Semifinals
1	Saint Kitts and Nevis	2
4	Dominica	0
3	Antigua and Barbuda	1
2	Saint Lucia	2

Finals
1	Saint Kitts and Nevis	1
2	Saint Lucia	2

Repechage

Final of repechage
Saint Vincent and the Grenadines	2
Anguilla	0
Grenada	2
British Virgin Islands	1

Playoff
Antigua and Barbuda	2
Saint Vincent and the Grenadines	0
Grenada	0
Dominica	2

- Anguilla is not a member of the IOC, and thus was not able to qualify for the games.

==== CAZOVA ====
This zonal tournament was held in Chaguanas, Trinidad and Tobago, in December 2010.

Quarterfinals
1	Jamaica	3
8	Virgin Islands	1
4	Barbados	2
5	Bahamas	3
3	Aruba	4
6	Curaçao	0
7	Suriname	1
2	Trinidad and Tobago	3

Semifinals
1	Jamaica	1
5	Bahamas	2
3	Aruba	1
2	Trinidad and Tobago	2

Finals
5	Bahamas	2
2	Trinidad and Tobago	1

Repechage

Final of repechage
Virgin Islands	1
Barbados	2
Curaçao	2
Suriname	1

Playoff
Aruba	1
Barbados	2
Curaçao	1
Jamaica	2

- Curaçao is not a member of the IOC, and thus was not able to qualify for the games.

==== AFECAVOL ====
The competition was held in Montelimar, Nicaragua, in January 2011.

Quarterfinals
1	Costa Rica	-
BYE	-
4	Nicaragua	3
5	Honduras	0
3	El Salvador	3
6	Belize	0
7	Panama	0
2	Guatemala	3

Semifinals
1	Costa Rica	3
4	Nicaragua	1
3	El Salvador	2
2	Guatemala	3

Finals
1	Costa Rica	3
2	Guatemala	1

Repechage

Final of repechage
BYE	-
Honduras	-
Belize	2
Panama	3

Playoff
El Salvador	3
Honduras	0
Panama	0
Nicaragua	3

==== Central ====
6 teams will compete, with the top 4 advancing to the next round. The competition was held in Boca Chica, Dominican Republic, in April 2011.

Quarterfinals
1	Puerto Rico	-
BYE	-
4	United States	0
5	Canada	4
3	Mexico	4
6	Dominican Republic	0
BYE	-
Cuba

Semifinals
1	Puerto Rico	1
5	Canada	3
3	Mexico	1
2	Cuba	3

Finals
5	Canada	3
2	Cuba	2

Repechage

Final of repechage
United States	-
BYE	-
BYE	-
Dominican Republic	-

Finals
United States	2
Mexico	3
Puerto Rico	3
Dominican Republic	1

=== Inter-Zonal ===
==== ECVA vs. CAZOVA ====
The competition was held in Cayman Islands in December 2011.

Round 1
Dominica	0
Cayman Islands	2
Jamaica	2
Saint Vincent and the Grenadines	0

Quarterfinals
Bahamas	2
Cayman Islands	1
Saint Kitts and Nevis	2
Barbados	1
Trinidad and Tobago	2
Antigua and Barbuda	0
Jamaica	2
Saint Lucia	0

Semifinals
Bahamas	2
Saint Kitts and Nevis	1
Trinidad and Tobago	2
Jamaica	1

Finals
Bahamas	1
Trinidad and Tobago	2

Repechage

Round 1		Round 2		Round 3
Saint Vincent and the Grenadines	0
Barbados	2	Barbados	0
		Cayman Islands	2
				Jamaica	2
				Cayman Islands	0

Round 1		Round 2		Round 3
				Saint Lucia	1
				Saint Kitts and Nevis	2
		Dominica	0
Dominica	2	Saint Lucia	2
Antigua and Barbuda	1

5th place match
1	Saint Lucia	1
2	Cayman Islands	2

==== AFECAVOL vs. ECVA/CAZOVA ====
The competition was held in Montelimar, Nicaragua, in February 2012.

Round 1
El Salvador	3
Cayman Islands	1
Saint Kitts and Nevis	2
Panama	3

Quarterfinals
Trinidad and Tobago	1
El Salvador	3
Guatemala	3
Jamaica	1
Bahamas	1
Nicaragua	3
Panama	1
Costa Rica	3

Semifinals
El Salvador	2
Guatemala	3
Nicaragua	0
Costa Rica	4

Finals
Guatemala	2
Costa Rica	3

Repechage

Round 1		Round 2		Round 3
Cayman Islands	1
Jamaica	2	Jamaica	2
		Trinidad and Tobago	1
				Jamaica	1
				Nicaragua	2

Round 1		Round 2		Round 3
				Panama	0
				El Salvador	2
		Panama	2
Saint Kitts and Nevis	2	Saint Kitts and Nevis	1
Bahamas	1

=== Continental Cup Final ===
- Canada
- Costa Rica
- Cuba
- El Salvador
- Guatemala
- Mexico
- Nicaragua
- Puerto Rico

== Women ==
=== Did not enter ===
- Bermuda
- Haiti

=== Zonal ===
==== EVCA ====
This zonal tournament was held in St. John's, Antigua and Barbuda, in November 2010.

Quarterfinals
Saint Lucia	3
Dominica	2
Antigua and Barbuda	3
Saint Vincent and the Grenadines	1
Grenada	3
British Virgin Islands	1
Anguilla	0
Saint Kitts and Nevis	4

Semifinals
Saint Lucia	2
Antigua and Barbuda	1
Grenada	0
Saint Kitts and Nevis	2

Final
Saint Lucia
1	Saint Kitts and Nevis	2

Repechage

Final of repechage
Dominica	2
Saint Vincent and the Grenadines	0
British Virgin Islands	1
Anguilla	2

Playoff
Grenada	0
Dominica	3
Anguilla	0
Antigua and Barbuda	3

==== CAZOVA ====
This zonal tournament was held in Chaguanas, Trinidad and Tobago, in December 2010.

Quarterfinals
1	Trinidad and Tobago	2
8	Virgin Islands	0
4	Curaçao	2
5	Aruba	0
3	Barbados	2
6	Suriname	0
7	Bahamas	0
2	Jamaica	2

Semifinals
1	Trinidad and Tobago	2
4	Curaçao	1
3	Barbados	2
2	Jamaica	1

Final
1	Trinidad and Tobago	2
3	Barbados	0

Final of repechage
Virgin Islands	2
Aruba	1
Suriname	2
Bahamas	1

Playoff
Jamaica	2
Virgin Islands	1
Suriname	1
Curaçao	2

==== AFECAVOL ====
The competition was held in Montelimar, Nicaragua, in January 2011.

Quarterfinals
1	Costa Rica	-
BYE	-
4	Nicaragua	4
5	Belize	0
3	El Salvador	3
6	Honduras	1
7	Panama	3
2	Guatemala	2

Semifinals
1	Costa Rica	3
4	Nicaragua	1
3	El Salvador	2
7	Panama	3

Finals
1	Costa Rica	3
7	Panama	1

Repechage

Final of repechage
BYE	-
Belize	-
Honduras	2
Guatemala	3

Playoff
El Salvador	3
Belize	0
Guatemala	3
Nicaragua	2

==== Central ====
6 teams will compete, with the top 4 advancing to the next round. The competition was held in Boca Chica, Dominican Republic, in April 2011.

Quarterfinals
1	Puerto Rico	-
BYE	-
4	Mexico	1
5	Canada	3
3	United States	4
6	Dominican Republic	0
BYE	-
2	Cuba

Semifinals
1	Puerto Rico	1
5	Canada	3
3	United States	1
2	Cuba	3

Finals
5	Canada	2
2	Cuba	3

Repechage

Final of repechage
Mexico	-
BYE	-
BYE	-
Dominican Republic	-

Finals
Mexico	3
United States	2
Puerto Rico	3
Dominican Republic	1

=== Inter-Zonal ===
==== ECVA vs. CAZOVA ====
The competition was held in Cayman Islands in December 2011.

Round 1
Antigua and Barbuda	1
Cayman Islands	2
Jamaica	2
Grenada	0

Quarterfinals
Trinidad and Tobago	2
Cayman Islands	1
Saint Lucia	0
Curaçao	2
Barbados	2
Dominica	0
Jamaica	2
Saint Kitts and Nevis	1

Semifinals
Trinidad and Tobago	2
Curaçao	1
Barbados	2
Jamaica	1

Finals
Trinidad and Tobago	0
Barbados	2

Repechage

Round 1		Round 2		Round 3
Grenada	0
Saint Lucia	2	Saint Lucia	1
		Cayman Islands	2
				Cayman Islands	1
				Jamaica	2

Round 1		Round 2		Round 3
				Saint Kitts and Nevis	1
				Curaçao	2
		Saint Kitts and Nevis	2
Antigua and Barbuda	2	Antigua and Barbuda	0
Dominica	0

5th place match
1	Cayman Islands	2
2	Saint Kitts and Nevis	1

==== AFECAVOL vs. ECVA/CAZOVA ====
The competition was held in Mal Pais, Costa Rica, in February 2012.

Round 1
El Salvador	4
Cayman Islands	0
Jamaica	0
Nicaragua	4

Quarterfinals
Barbados	0
El Salvador	4
Panama	2
Curaçao	3
Trinidad and Tobago	2
Guatemala	3
Nicaragua	2
Costa Rica	3

Semifinals
El Salvador	3
Curaçao	1
Guatemala	1
Costa Rica	3

Finals
El Salvador	0
Costa Rica	4

Repechage

Round 1		Round 2		Round 3
Cayman Islands	2
Panama	1	Cayman Islands	2
		Barbados	1
				Cayman Islands	0
				Guatemala	2

Round 1		Round 2		Round 3
				Nicaragua	2
				Curaçao	0
		Nicaragua	2
Jamaica	1	Trinidad and Tobago	0
Trinidad and Tobago	2

=== Continental Cup Final ===
- Canada
- Costa Rica
- Cuba
- El Salvador
- Guatemala
- Mexico
- Nicaragua
- Puerto Rico

== See also ==
- Volleyball at the 2012 Summer Olympics
