= Ruwida El-Hubti =

Libyan athlete (born 1989)

Ruwida El-Hubti (born 16 April 1989) is an Olympic athlete from Libya. At the 2004 Summer Olympics, she competed in the Women's 400 metres. She finished last in her heat with a time of 1:03.57, almost 11 seconds slower than anyone else in the heat, and the slowest of anyone in the competition. However, she did set a national record.
