= Athletics at the 2004 Summer Olympics – Women's 400 metres =

Women's 400 metres at the Games of the XXVIII Olympiad
- Venue: Athens Olympic Stadium
- Dates: 21–24 August
- Competitors: 42 from 31 nations
- Winning time: 49.42

Medalists
1st place, gold medalist(s)		Tonique Williams-Darling	Bahamas
2nd place, silver medalist(s)		Ana Guevara	Mexico
3rd place, bronze medalist(s)		Natalya Antyukh	Russia

The women's 400 metres at the 2004 Summer Olympics as part of the athletics program were held at the Athens Olympic Stadium from August 21 to 24. The winning margin was 0.14 seconds.

The first round had split a full roster of runners into eight heats with the first three gaining a direct qualification and then the next six fastest across all heats advancing to the semifinals. The top two runners in each of the three semifinal heats moved on directly to the final, and they are immediately joined by the next two fastest from any of the semifinals.

Coming into the final, the fastest qualifiers were Monique Hennagan and Natalya Antyukh challenging each other in their semi final, Tonique Williams-Darling racing DeeDee Trotter in theirs, with world champion Ana Guevara cruising her semi final just staying ahead of Christine Amertil. In the final, Hennagan again went for the lead with Amertil and Natalya Nazarova each taking their shot at her in the first 200, only to fade after. Starting slightly slower, Williams came on strongly on the backstretch, marked by Guevara around the second turn. Coming off the turn Guevara had Williams where she wanted her, and Sanya Richards about even with Hennigan a couple of steps behind, with Antyukh and Trotter another step behind. Less than 50 meters from the finish, Guevara moved into the lead, but Williams kicked it into a different gear and pulled away to finish with gold. On the inside, Trotter rocketed past Richards and was gaining on Hennagan. Hennagan tried to fight, long striding with a slowing cadence to the finish, losing ground to a fast closing Antyukh. Defeated, Guevara gave up the fight and glided across the finish line with silver. 3 meters back, Antyukh clearly beat a wilting Hennagan, who still managed to hold off the fast closing Trotter.

== Records ==
Prior to the competition, the existing World record, Olympic record, and world leading time were as follows:

World record	Marita Koch (GDR)	47.60 s	Canberra, Australia	6 October 1985
Olympic record	Marie-José Pérec (FRA)	48.25 s	Atlanta, United States	29 July 1996
World Leading	Tonique Williams-Darling (BAH)	49.15 s	Paris, France	23 July 2004

No new records were set during the competition.

== Qualification ==
The qualification period for athletics was 1 January 2003 to 9 August 2004. For the men's 400 metres, each National Olympic Committee was permitted to enter up to three athletes that had run the race in 51.50 seconds or faster during the qualification period. If an NOC had no athletes that qualified under that standard, one athlete that had run the race in 52.30 seconds or faster could be entered.

== Schedule ==
All times are Eastern European Summer Time (UTC+3)

Date	Time	Round
Saturday, 21 August 2004	09:50	Round 1
Sunday, 22 August 2004	22:20	Semifinals
Tuesday, 24 August 2004	22:50	Final

== Results ==
=== Round 1 ===
Qualification rule: The first three finishers in each heat (Q) plus the next six fastest overall runners (q) advanced to the semifinals.

==== Heat 1 ====
Rank	Lane	Athlete	Nation	Time	Notes
1	8	Ana Guevara	Mexico	50.93	Q
2	5	Lee McConnell	Great Britain	51.19	Q
3	4	Grażyna Prokopek	Poland	51.29	Q, PB
4	7	Fatou Bintou Fall	Senegal	51.87	q
5	2	Hortense Bewouda	Cameroon	52.11	
6	6	Oksana Luneva	Kyrgyzstan	52.94	
7	3	Ruwida El-Hubti	Libya	1:03.57	NR

==== Heat 2 ====
Rank	Lane	Athlete	Nation	Time	Notes
1	4	Monique Hennagan	United States	51.02	Q
2	8	Mariyana Dimitrova	Bulgaria	51.29	Q
3	7	Kaltouma Nadjina	Chad	51.50	Q
4	3	Nadia Davy	Jamaica	52.04	
5	2	Maria Laura Almirão	Brazil	52.10	
6	6	Kirsi Mykkänen	Finland	52.53	
7	5	Bo Fanfang	China	56.01	

==== Heat 3 ====
Rank	Lane	Athlete	Nation	Time	Notes
1	3	Natalya Nazarova	Russia	50.82	Q
2	7	Donna Fraser	Great Britain	51.19	Q
3	2	Hazel-Ann Regis	Grenada	51.66	Q
4	5	Estie Wittstock	South Africa	51.89	q
5	6	Amy Mbacké Thiam	Senegal	52.44	
6	8	Amantle Montsho	Botswana	53.77	NR
7	4	Zamira Amirova	Uzbekistan	54.43	

==== Heat 4 ====
Rank	Lane	Athlete	Nation	Time	Notes
1	7	Natalya Antyukh	Russia	50.54	Q
2	5	DeeDee Trotter	United States	50.56	Q
3	6	Novlene Williams	Jamaica	50.59	Q, PB
4	3	Aliann Pompey	Guyana	51.33	q
5	8	Egle Uljas	Estonia	51.91	q, NR
6	2	Svetlana Bodritskaya	Kazakhstan	53.35	
7	4	Shifana Ali	Maldives	1:00.92	NR

==== Heat 5 ====
Rank	Lane	Athlete	Nation	Time	Notes
1	8	Tonique Williams-Darling	Bahamas	51.20	Q
2	5	Sviatlana Usovich	Belarus	51.37	Q
3	3	Antonina Yefremova	Ukraine	51.53	Q
4	2	Mireille Nguimgo	Cameroon	51.90	q
5	4	Allison Beckford	Jamaica	52.85	
6	7	Sandrine Thiébaud-Kangni	Togo	52.87	
7	6	Damayanthi Dharsha	Sri Lanka	54.58	

==== Heat 6 ====
Rank	Lane	Athlete	Nation	Time	Notes
1	2	Sanya Richards	United States	50.11	Q
2	3	Christine Amertil	Bahamas	50.23	Q, PB
3	7	Christine Ohuruogu	Great Britain	50.50	Q, PB
4	8	Tiandra Ponteen	Saint Kitts and Nevis	51.17	q
5	4	Geisa Coutinho	Brazil	52.18	
6	5	Makelesi Bulikiobo	Fiji	53.58	
7	6	Salamtou Hassane	Niger	1:03.28	NR

=== Semifinals ===
Qualification rule: The first two finishers in each heat (Q) plus the next two fastest overall runners (q) moved on to the final.

==== Semifinal 1 ====
Rank	Lane	Athlete	Nation	Time	Notes
1	4	Ana Guevara	Mexico	50.15	Q
2	3	Christine Amertil	Bahamas	50.17	Q, PB
3	5	Sanya Richards	United States	50.54	q
4	1	Christine Ohuruogu	Great Britain	51.00	
5	2	Tiandra Ponteen	Saint Kitts and Nevis	51.33	
6	6	Sviatlana Usovich	Belarus	51.42	
7	7	Hazel-Ann Regis	Grenada	51.47	
8	8	Egle Uljas	Estonia	53.13	

==== Semifinal 2 ====
Rank	Lane	Athlete	Nation	Time	Notes
1	4	Tonique Williams-Darling	Bahamas	50.00	Q
2	5	DeeDee Trotter	United States	50.14	Q, PB
3	3	Natalya Nazarova	Russia	50.63	q
4	1	Fatou Bintou Fall	Senegal	51.21	
5	8	Kaltouma Nadjina	Chad	51.57	
6	2	Estie Wittstock	South Africa	51.77	
7	6	Donna Fraser	Great Britain	51.94	
8	7	Grażyna Prokopek	Poland	51.96	

==== Semifinal 3 ====
Rank	Lane	Athlete	Nation	Time	Notes
1	5	Monique Hennagan	United States	49.88	Q
2	4	Natalya Antyukh	Russia	50.04	Q
3	1	Novlene Williams	Jamaica	50.85	
4	6	Mariyana Dimitrova	Bulgaria	51.20	PB
5	7	Aliann Pompey	Guyana	51.61	
6	2	Antonina Yefremova	Ukraine	51.90	
7	8	Mireille Nguimgo	Cameroon	52.21	
8	3	Lee McConnell	Great Britain	52.63	

=== Final ===
Rank	Lane	Athlete	Nation	Time	Notes
1st place, gold medalist(s)	4	Tonique Williams-Darling	Bahamas	49.42	
2nd place, silver medalist(s)	3	Ana Guevara	Mexico	49.56	SB
3rd place, bronze medalist(s)	6	Natalya Antyukh	Russia	49.89	
4	5	Monique Hennagan	United States	49.97	
5	1	DeeDee Trotter	United States	50.00	PB
6	2	Sanya Richards	United States	50.19	
7	8	Christine Amertil	Bahamas	50.37	
8	7	Natalya Nazarova	Russia	50.65	
