= Troy Nisbett =

Nevisian swimmer (born 2009)

Personal information
- Nationality: Nevisian
- Born: 6 January 2009 (age 17)

Sport
- Sport: Swimming
- Strokes: Freestyle

Troy Nisbett (born 6 January 2009) is a Nevisian swimmer. He was the first swimmer to represent Saint Kitts and Nevis at the Olympic Games, competing at the 2024 Summer Olympics, and is Saint Kitts and Nevis' youngest ever Olympian. He has also competed at the World Aquatics Championships and twice at the CARIFTA Aquatics Championships.

== Career ==
Troy Nisbett was born on 6 January 2009. He competed in the 50 m freestyle and 100 m freestyle events at the 2024 World Aquatics Championships, in which he swam times of 29.23 and 1:05.84, respectively. After the event, the Department of Nevis said: "one thing that always stands out is the impact of first steps [...] introducing ambassador Troy Nisbett". The following month, Nisbett competed at the 2024 CARIFTA Aquatics Championships in The Bahamas.

At 15 years old, Nisbett became the first swimmer to represent Saint Kitts and Nevis at the Olympic Games by qualifying for the 2024 Summer Olympics in Paris, France, through universality. He competed in the 50 m freestyle, in which he finished 69th out of 73 swimmers in the event with a time of 28.71. This performance also made him Nevis' third Olympian and the youngest ever Olympian to represent Saint Kitts and Nevis. Nisbett also competed at the 2025 CARIFTA Aquatics Championships.

=== Training ===
Nisbett has been coached by James Weekes since he was six years old, and Weekes accompanied Nisbett at his Olympic debut. Nisbett trains in the ocean surrounding his home island of Nevis, which Weekes says is a slightly disadvantageous training environment due to the waves, currents, and the salt water being more buoyant than the fresh water in swimming pools. During the lead-up to the 2024 Olympics, Nisbett trained in an Olympic-sized pool for the first time.
