= Saint Kitts and Nevis national athletics team =

National sports team

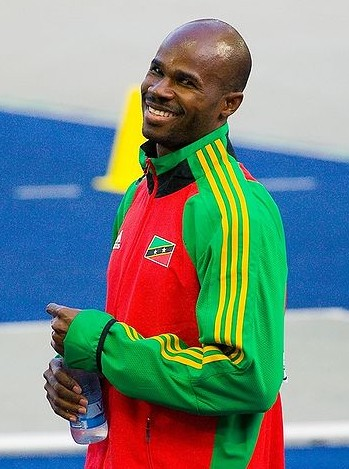
Kim Collins, the only gold medalist in the history of Saint Kitts and Nevis.

The Saint Kitts and Nevis national athletics team represents Saint Kitts and Nevis at the international athletics competitions such as Olympic Games or World Athletics Championships.

== Medal count ==
Saint Kitts and Nevis has 5 participations in the Summer Olympic of 27 editions held from 1896 to 2012.

| Competition | Medal table | | | | |
| Competition | 1st place, gold medalist(s) | 2nd place, silver medalist(s) | 3rd place, bronze medalist(s) | Tot. | Rank |
|---|---|---|---|---|---|
| Summer Olympics | 0 | 0 | 0 | 0 | - |
| World Championships | 1 | 0 | 4 | 5 | 57 |
| Total | 1 | 0 | 4 | 5 | |

== See also ==
- Saint Kitts and Nevis at the Olympics
- Saint Kitts and Nevis records in athletics
- Athletics Summer Olympics medal table
- World Championships medal table
