= Amya Clarke =

Saint Kitts and Nevis athlete (born 1999)

Personal information
- Full name: Amya Briana Clarke
- Nationality: Saint Kitts and Nevis
- Born: 10 September 1999 (age 26)
- Height: 5’5
- Weight: 130 lb (59 kg)

Sport
- Sport: Track and field
- Event: 100 metres
Medal record
Women's athletics
Representing Saint Kitts and Nevis
Junior Pan American Games
| Silver medal – second place | 2021 Cali-Valle | 100 m |
NACAC U23 Championships
| Silver medal – second place | 2021 San José | 100 m |

Amya Briana Clarke (born 10 September 1999) is an athlete from Saint Kitts and Nevis. She competed over 100 metres at the 2020 Olympic Games and was a silver medalist at the 2021 Junior Pan American Games and the 2021 NACAC U23 Championships.

== Biography ==
From Christ Church where she attended Saddlers Secondary School before going to Iowa Western Community College, and the University of Akron in Ohio. In June 2021, under the universality rule within the Olympic qualifying criteria which allows smaller nations with developing sports programs to send representatives to the competition she was confirmed as being selected for the delayed 2020 Summer Olympics in the 100 metres, where she qualified from her preliminary heat with a time of 11.67 seconds. She was awarded the honour of being the flag bearer for her nation in the opening ceremony. She won the 100 m silver medal in the 2021 NACAC U23 Championships. She won the 2021 Junior Pan American Games 100 m silver medal at the games held in Colombia.

Olympic Games
| Preceded by Antoine Adams | Flagbearer for Saint Kitts and Nevis (with Jason Rogers); Tokyo 2020 | Succeeded by Zahria Allers-Liburd; Naqille Harris |
