= Malmö Games =

Swedish sporting event

- Date: February or July
- Location: Malmö Arena, Sweden
- Event type: Track and field
- Established: 2015
- Website: Malmö Games

The Malmö Games was an indoor track and field competition. It was held in 2015 and took place at the Malmö Arena in Malmö, Sweden.

== Indoor meeting records ==
=== Men ===
Men's meeting records of the Malmö Games
Event	Record	Athlete	Nationality	Date	Ref.
60 m	6.52	Kim Collins	Saint Kitts and Nevis	25 February 2015	
60 m hurdles	7.52	Orlando Ortega	Cuba	25 February 2015	
60 m hurdles	7.52	Aries Merritt	United States	25 February 2015	
High jump	2.34 m	Mutaz Essa Barshim	Qatar	25 February 2015	
Pole vault	5.92 m	Renaud Lavillenie	France	25 February 2015	
Long jump	7.78 m	Tobias Montler Nilsson	Sweden	25 February 2015	

=== Women ===
Women's meeting records of the Malmö Games
Event	Record	Athlete	Nationality	Date	Ref.
60 m	7.14	Murielle Ahouré	Ivory Coast	25 February 2015	
60 m hurdles	7.83	Sharika Nelvis	United States	25 February 2015	
High jump	1.76 m	Sandra Christensen	Denmark	25 February 2015	
Pole vault	4.25 m	Malin Dahlström	Sweden	25 February 2015	
Long jump	6.83 m	Ivana Španović	Serbia	25 February 2015	
