= Saint Kitts and Nevis Olympic Committee =

National Olympic Committee

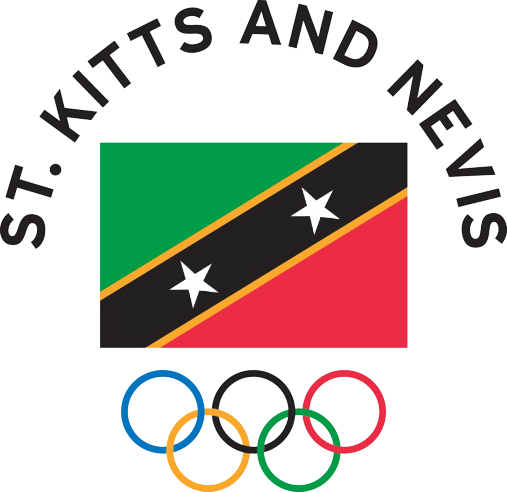
- Country: Saint Kitts and Nevis
- Code: SKN
- Created: 1986
- Recognized: 1993
- Continental Association: PASO
- Headquarters: Basseterre
- President: Alphonso Bridgewater
- Secretary General: Glenville Jeffer
- Website: www.sknoc.org

The Saint Kitts and Nevis Olympic Committee (IOC code: SKN) is the National Olympic Committee (NOC) representing Saint Kitts and Nevis at the Olympic Games. It is also the body responsible for Saint Kitts and Nevis's representation at the Commonwealth Games. The executive board consists of the president, secretary general, vice president, assistant secretary general, and four members. The president is Alphonso Bridgewater and the secretary general is Glenville Jeffers. The committee has overseen six Olympic and five Commonwealth Games, winning one gold medal at the 2002 Commonwealth Games, by Kim Collins in the 100 meters.

== History ==
The Saint Kitts and Nevis Olympic Association was founded with a constitution on 27 May 1986. Saint Kitts and Nevis Amateur Athletics Association was formed in 1977 and joined the International Olympic Committee (IOC) in 1993. The Association created a National Olympic Committee (NOC), which was first officially recognized in 1993. The NOC and Commonwealth Games Association (CGA) both governed multiple sports prior to 1998. Since they both shared the same member organizations, the CGA merged with the NOC, making the NOC responsible for both the Olympic Games and the Commonwealth Games. The constitution was revised on 10 June 2004; ratified 30 November 2006; and approved by the IOC 1 June 2007. The NOC was officially located at the Charles Wilkin Building in Basseterre, Saint Kitts from 1994 to 2005, when it moved to the Olympic House. In June 2015, it launched a strategic plan to aid in the development of sport in Saint Kitts and Nevis for the following nine years until 2024. As of April 2020, the president is Alphonso Bridgewater and the secretary general is Glenville Jeffers. The NOC is a part of the Pan American Sports Organisation.

== Events ==
=== Olympics ===
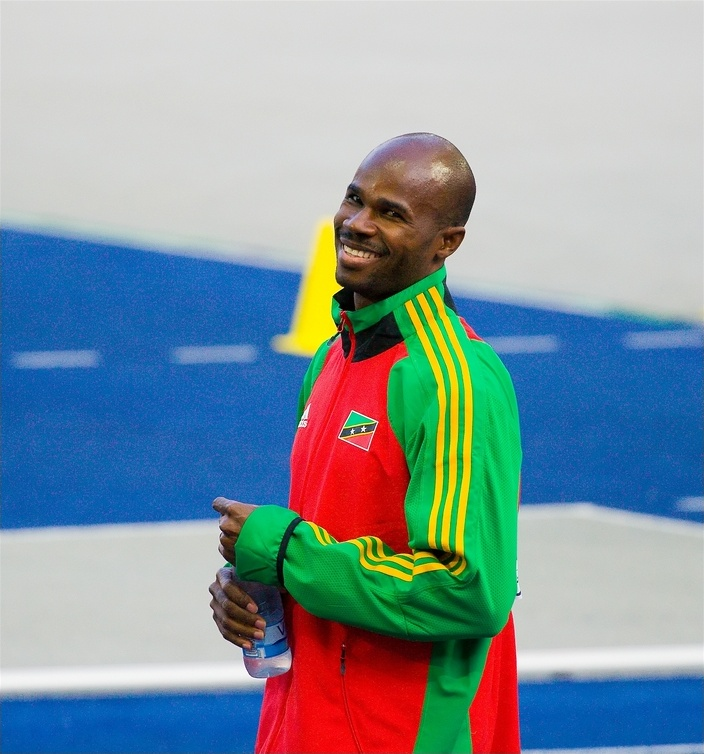
Kim Collins competed at five of the first six Olympic Games for the committee.

Saint Kitts and Nevis participates in the Olympic Games in the Summer Olympics and have not competed at the Winter Games. Saint Kitts and Nevis entered the Olympic Games for the first time at the 1996 Summer Games in Atlanta, United States. The delegation featured one athlete in both the men's and women's 100-meter sprints and three relay teams. Both sprinters reached the quarter-finals of the respective events, with the relay teams not advancing past the first round.

Four years later, at the 2000 Summer Games, two athletes were sent, with Kim Collins reaching the final of the 100 meter event; placing seventh. At the following event in 2004, Collins placed one better, reaching sixth position in the same event. Collins competed in the 200 meters in 2008 also finishing fourth, with a time of 20.59 seconds. The NOC did not allow Collins to compete in 2012 stating had violated team rules, and did not allow him to compete. The 4 × 100 relay team of Delwayne Delaney, Brijesh Lawrence, Jason Rogers, and Lestrod Roland made a new national record during the first round of 38.41 seconds but did not progress past the first round.

The 2016 Olympics featured seven participants, led by team captain Antoine Adams. At the event, Collins was the first 40-year-old to run a 100 meters under 10 seconds, where he was the oldest sprinter at the Games. Collins advanced the furthest of any Saint Kitts and Nevis athlete, reaching the semi-finals of the event. He finished sixth in his heat with a time of 10.12 seconds and did not advance to the finals. Adams and Lawrence both reached the quarter-finals in the same event.

=== Commonwealth Games ===
Prior to 1998, the nation's participation in the Commonwealth Games and the Commonwealth Youth Games was organised by the Saint Kitts and Nevis Commonwealth Games Association. Since that time, the Olympic Committee has been in charge of participation. Saint Kitts and Nevis joined the Commonwealth Games Federation and first participated in the Commonwealth Games in 1978 (as part of Saint Christopher-Nevis-Anguilla) where they participated in both athletics (100 and 800 meters) and cycling (road and track). The committee has subsequently sent teams to compete in every Commonwealth Games since 1990. The nation has won just one medal at the Games, a gold for Kim Collins in the 100 meters at the 2002 Games. The country has participated in athletics, cycling and table tennis.

== Affiliates ==
The NOC's affiliates feature:

- St Kitts and Nevis Amateur Athletic Association (SKNAAA)
- St Kitts – Nevis Amateur Basketball Association (SKNABA)
- St Kitts and Nevis Amateur Boxing Association (SKNABA)
- St Kitts – Nevis Football Association (SKNFA)
- St Kitts and Nevis Table Tennis Association (SKNTTA)
- St Christopher and Nevis Taekwondo Federation (SCNTF)
- St Kitts Amateur Volleyball Association (SKAVA)
- St Kitts Netball Association (SKNA)
- St Kitts & Netball Aquatics Federation (SKNAF)
- St Kitts & Nevis Sailing Association (SKNSA)
- St Kitts and Nevis Tennis Association (SKNTA)
- St Kitts and Nevis Handball Association (SKNHA)

== See also ==
- Saint Kitts and Nevis at the Olympics
- Saint Kitts and Nevis at the Commonwealth Games
