= Saint Kitts and Nevis at the 2012 Summer Olympics =

- IOC code: SKN
- NOC: Saint Kitts and Nevis Olympic Committee
- Website: www.sknoc.org

in London
- Competitors: 7 in 1 sport
- Flag bearers: Kim Collins (opening); Antoine Adams (closing)
- Medals: Gold 0 Silver 0 Bronze 0 Total 0

Summer Olympics appearances (overview)
- 1996; 2000; 2004; 2008; 2012; 2016; 2020; 2024; 2028

Saint Kitts and Nevis competed at the 2012 Summer Olympics in London, United Kingdom from 27 July to 12 August 2012. This was the nation's fifth consecutive appearance at the Olympics.

The St. Kitts and Nevis Olympic Committee sent a total of seven athletes to the Games, six men and one woman, to compete in athletics. Two of these athletes did not compete at these Games. Sprinter Tameka Williams withdrew from the games after admitting using a banned substance. Meanwhile, veteran sprinter Kim Collins, who carried the nation's flag for the third time at the opening ceremony, was sent home by the sporting committee, reportedly for spending the night with his wife at a London hotel.

== Background ==
The appearance of Saint Kitts and Nevis at the London Summer Olympics marked its fifth consecutive summer appearance since it first entered the Games during the 1996 Summer Olympics. As of these Olympics, Saint Kitts and Nevis had not won an Olympic medal. Kim Collins and Antoine Adams were the flagbearers for Saint Kitts and Nevis in the opening and closing ceremonies, respectively. They debuted at the 1996 Olympic Games with ten athletes, the most they have ever sent to the Games.

== Athletics ==
Antoine Adams finished fourth in the quarterfinals of the 100 meter sprint with a time of 10.22 seconds, advancing him to the semifinals. His seventh place finish in the semifinals, with a time of 10.27 seconds, eliminated him from competition. Adams also competed in the 200 meter sprint, finishing second in his heat with a time of 20.59 seconds, advancing to the semifinals. He was disqualified during the semifinals heat.

The 20 year old Jason Rogers ran the 100 meters. He finished fifth in his heat with a time of 10.30 seconds, and did not qualify for the semifinals.

The 4 × 100 meter men's relay team—made up of Antoine Adams, Delwayne Delaney, Brijesh Lawrence, Jason Rogers, and Lestrod Roland—set a national record during the event with a time of 38.41 seconds. Although they set a national record, they placed sixth, which was not fast enough to advance them to the next round.

Kim Collins, who has competed in every Games that Saint Kitts and Nevis has participated in, was set to run the 100 meters. Collins was not allowed to compete by his Olympic committee after they found out he stayed with his wife, outside of the Olympic village. Collins was required to get permission to stay outside the village for multiple nights in a row, and the committee stated he violated team discipline rules. On the issue of not being allowed to compete, Collins said "I feel that I should stay in a hotel with my wife, with or without their permission, that's the honest to God truth whether they like it or not." He planned to never race for the country again, stating, "This is how it ends, it ends on a really sad note. I should have been allowed to run. I don't see what is the big deal, I am a grown man, I'm just about to become a grandfather." Collins would later compete in the 2016 Olympics for Saint Kitts and Nevis.

Tameka Williams qualified to run in the 100 meter and 200 meter sprints. Williams, who would later compete in the 2016 Rio Olympics, was disqualified because she admitted that she used a banned substance. She voluntarily told her Olympic committee about using a banned substance, and it was announced on July 29 that she would not compete. Williams admitted to using a drug named Blast Off Red, which is typically used to enhance the performance of racehorses and greyhounds. Williams had posted on Facebook that she was innocent and had passed drug tests prior to the Olympics. While the drug is not listed as prohibited by the World Anti-Doping Agency, it falls into the category of veterinary medicine and therefore its use is not permitted.

Men

Athlete	Event	Heat		Quarterfinal		Semifinal		Final		Notes
Athlete	Event	Result	Rank	Result	Rank	Result	Rank	Result	Rank	Notes
Antoine Adams	100 meter	Bye		10.22	4 q	10.27	7	Did not advance		
Antoine Adams	200 meter	20.59	2 Q	—N/a		DSQ		Did not advance		
Jason Rogers	100 meter	Bye		10.30	5	Did not advance				
Kim Collins	100 meter	Bye		DNS		Did not advance				
Antoine Adams; Brijesh Lawrence; Jason Rogers; Lestrod Roland	4 × 100 meter relay	38.41 NR	6	—N/a				Did not advance		

Key

- Note–Ranks given for track events are within the athlete's heat only
- Q = Qualified for the next round
- q = Qualified for the next round as a fastest loser or, in field events, by position without achieving the qualifying target
- NR = National record
- N/A = Round not applicable for the event
- Bye = Athlete not required to compete in round
