= Bernadeth Prentice =

Saint Kitts and Nevis athlete (born 1969)

Bernadeth Angela Prentice (born 31 May 1969) is an athlete from Saint Kitts and Nevis.

She was a member of the first ever team to represent Saint Kitts and Nevis at the Olympic Games when she competed in the 4 x 100 metres relay and the 4 x 400 metres relay at the 1996 Summer Olympics. The team failed to finish and came in seventh place in the respective events and so did not qualify for the final.
