= Alain Maxime Isiah =

Saint Kitts and Nevis athlete (born 1977)

Personal information
- Nationality: Saint Kitts and Nevis
- Born: 19 December 1977 (age 48)

Sport
- Country: Saint Kitts and Nevis
- Sport: athletics
- Event: Sprint
Medal record
athletics
Representing Saint Kitts and Nevis

Alain Maxime Isiah (born 19 December 1977) is a Saint Kitts and Nevis athlete.

He was part of the first ever team to represent Saint Kitts and Nevis at the Olympic Games when he competed at the 1996 Summer Olympic Games in the 4 x 100 metres relay, the relay team finished four in their heat so didn't advance to the next round.
