= Ricardo Liddie =

Saints Kitts and Nevis athlete (born 1966)

Ricardo Liddie (born 5 February 1966) he is a retired athlete from Saint Kitts and Nevis.

He was part of the first team to represent Saint Kitts and Nevis at the Olympic Games when he competed at the 1996 Summer Olympic Games in the 4 x 100 metres relay. The relay team finished fourth in its heat so did not advance to the next round. He also competed in the relay at the 1995 World Championships in Athletics where the team finished 24th.
