= Elricia Francis =

Saint Kitts and Nevis athlete (born 1975)

Elricia Patricia Francis (born 11 October 1975) is a Saint Kitts and Nevis athlete.

She was part of the first ever team to represent Saint Kitts and Nevis at the Olympic Games when she competed at the 1996 Summer Olympic Games in the 4 x 100 metres relay, but the team failed to finish so didn't qualify for the next round.
