= Athletics at the 2008 Summer Olympics – Men's 200 metres =

Men's 200 metres at the Games of the XXIX Olympiad
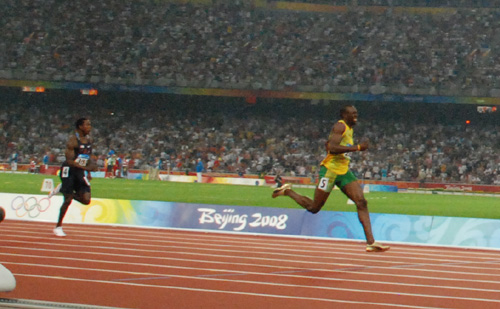
- Usain Bolt and Shawn Crawford in the closing stages of the final
- Venue: Beijing National Stadium
- Dates: August 18; August 20 (final)
- Competitors: 63 from 53 nations
- Winning time: 19.30 WR

Medalists
1st place, gold medalist(s)		Usain Bolt; Jamaica
2nd place, silver medalist(s)		Shawn Crawford; United States
3rd place, bronze medalist(s)		Walter Dix; United States

Official video @ YouTube

The men's 200 metres at the 2008 Summer Olympics took place on 18–20 August at the Beijing National Stadium. There were 63 competitors from 53 nations. Jamaican Usain Bolt set a new world record of 19.30 seconds in the final, and won by the largest margin of victory (0.66 seconds, after two disqualifications) in an Olympic 200 metres final (previously, Walter Tewksbury had a 0.6 seconds margin of victory in the first Olympic 200 m final in 1900). It was Jamaica's first victory in the event since 1976 and second overall, matching Canada and Italy for second-most (after the United States' 17 wins). The apparent silver and bronze medalists, Churandy Martina of the Netherlands Antilles and Wallace Spearmon of the United States, were both disqualified. Those medals went to Americans Shawn Crawford and Walter Dix, who had been fourth and fifth across the finish line; Crawford gave his silver medal to Martina afterward. Crawford was the 10th man to win two medals in the 200 metres, and the third for whom those medals were gold and silver; nobody had yet won two gold medals.

== Background ==
This was the 25th appearance of the event, which was not held at the first Olympics in 1896 but has been on the program ever since. Two of the eight finalists from the 2004 Games returned: gold medalist Shawn Crawford of the United States and sixth-place finisher Stéphane Buckland of Mauritius. 2005 World Champion Justin Gatlin was serving a doping suspension; 2007 World Champion Tyson Gay had suffered a hamstring injury at the U.S. trials and did not make the team. Without those top Americans, the heavy favorite was Usain Bolt of Jamaica. Bolt had competed in 2004 but had struggled through injury and did not make the quarterfinals; in 2008, he was healthy and, by the time of the 200 metres, had already set a world record in the 100 metres in Beijing.

Ecuador, Jordan, Malta, and Uzbekistan each made their debut in the event. The United States made its 24th appearance, most of any nation, having missed only the boycotted 1980 Games.

== Summary ==
Bolt won by over half a second, even before a pair of disqualifications, breaking the world record in the event. Controversy arose within minutes after the medal race when American Wallace Spearmon, who had finished third in 19.95 seconds, was disqualified for stepping out of his lane. United States officials filed a protest, but withdrew it after seeing the video and noticing that silver medalist Churandy Martina (19.82 seconds), who had won the second ever Olympic medal for the Netherlands Antilles, also stepped out of his lane. They filed an appeal, which after more than an hour of deliberation was accepted. On March 6, 2009, the Court of Arbitration for Sport rejected an appeal by the National Olympic Committee of the Netherlands Antilles against Martina's disqualification. American Shawn Crawford, who had been awarded the silver medal, reportedly gave his medal to Martina on August 28, 2008 in a show of sportsmanship.

== Qualification ==
Each National Olympic Committee (NOC) was able to enter up to three entrants providing they had met the A qualifying standard (20.59) in the qualifying period (1 January 2007 to 23 July 2008). NOCs were also permitted to enter one athlete providing he had met the B standard (20.75) in the same qualifying period.

The qualifying standards were 20.59 seconds (A standard) and 20.75 seconds (B standard).

== Competition format ==
The competition used the four round format introduced in 1920: heats, quarterfinals, semifinals, and a final. The "fastest loser" system introduced in 1960 was used in the heats and quarterfinals.

There were 8 heats of 8 or 9 runners each (the first time that 9 runners were placed in a heat), with the top 3 men in each advancing to the quarterfinals along with the next 8 fastest overall. The quarterfinals consisted of 4 heats of 8 athletes each; the 3 fastest men in each heat and the next 4 fastest overall advanced to the semifinals. There were 2 semifinals, each with 8 runners. The top 4 athletes in each semifinal advanced. The final had 8 runners. The races were run on a 400 metre track.

== Records ==
Prior to this competition, the existing world record, Olympic record, and world leading time were as follows:

World record	Michael Johnson (USA)	19.32 s	Atlanta, United States	1 August 1996
Olympic record	Michael Johnson (USA)	19.32 s	Atlanta, United States	1 August 1996
World Leading	Usain Bolt (JAM)	19.67 s	Athens, Greece	13 July 2008

Usain Bolt set a new world record in the final, running the race in 19.30 seconds.

== Schedule ==
For the second Games, the three-day schedule with semifinals and final on different day was used.

All times are China Standard Time (UTC+8)

Date	Time	Round
Monday, 18 August 2008	10:05; 20:05	Heats; Quarterfinals
Tuesday, 19 August 2008	21:25	Semifinals
Wednesday, 20 August 2008	22:20	Final

== Results ==
All times shown are in seconds.

=== Heats ===
The first round was held on 18 August. The first three runners of each heat (Q) plus the next eight overall fastest runners (q) qualified for the quarterfinals.

==== Heat 1 ====
Rank	Lane	Athlete	Nation	Reaction	Time	Notes
1	4	Shawn Crawford	United States	0.216	20.61	Q
2	6	Marcin Jędrusiński	Poland	0.199	20.64	Q
3	7	Stephan Buckland	Mauritius	0.229	20.98	Q
4	1	Jiří Vojtík	Czech Republic	0.165	21.05	
5	9	Fanuel Kenosi	Botswana	0.211	21.09	
6	3	Adam Harris	Guyana	0.163	21.36	
7	5	Khalil Al-Hanahneh	Jordan	0.184	21.55	SB
8	2	Solomon Bockarie	Sierra Leone	0.216	22.16	

==== Heat 2 ====
Rank	Lane	Athlete	Nation	Reaction	Time	Notes
1	3	Brian Dzingai	Zimbabwe	0.172	20.25	Q
2	5	Christian Malcolm	Great Britain	0.178	20.42	Q, SB
3	4	Christopher Williams	Jamaica	0.166	20.53	Q
4	8	Shinji Takahira	Japan	0.175	20.58	q, SB
5	2	Amr Ibrahim Mostafa Seoud	Egypt	0.172	20.75	q
6	9	Thuso Mpuang	South Africa	0.166	20.87	q
7	6	Daniel Grueso	Colombia	0.232	21.15	
8	7	Arnaldo Abrantes	Portugal	0.173	21.46	

==== Heat 3 ====
Rank	Lane	Athlete	Nation	Reaction	Time	Notes
1	8	Marlon Devonish	Great Britain	0.157	20.49	Q, SB
2	5	Kim Collins	Saint Kitts and Nevis	0.175	20.55	Q
3	7	Marvin Anderson	Jamaica	0.175	20.85	Q
4	9	Matic Osovnikar	Slovenia	0.189	20.89	q, SB
5	2	Chris Lloyd	Dominica	0.185	20.90	
6	6	Heber Viera	Uruguay	0.210	20.93	
7	4	Cristián Reyes	Chile	0.165	21.20	
8	3	Franklin Nazareno	Ecuador	0.174	21.26	

==== Heat 4 ====
Rank	Lane	Athlete	Nation	Reaction	Time	Notes
1	5	Roman Smirnov	Russia	0.166	20.76	Q
2	3	Walter Dix	United States	0.185	20.77	Q
3	9	Rolando Palacios	Honduras	0.202	20.81	Q
4	8	Ángel David Rodríguez	Spain	0.162	20.87	q
5	2	Bruno de Barros	Brazil	0.162	21.15	
6	7	Desislav Gunev	Bulgaria	0.178	21.55	
7	6	Vyacheslav Muravyev	Kazakhstan	0.206	21.68	
8	4	Nicolai Portelli	Malta	0.180	22.31	

==== Heat 5 ====
Rank	Lane	Athlete	Nation	Reaction	Time	Notes
1	6	Rondel Sorrillo	Trinidad and Tobago	0.193	20.58	Q
2	4	Usain Bolt	Jamaica	0.177	20.64	Q
3	2	Kristof Beyens	Belgium	0.148	20.69	Q
4	9	Marc Schneeberger	Switzerland	0.137	20.86	q
5	7	José Acevedo	Venezuela	0.270	21.06	
6	8	Ihor Bodrov	Ukraine	0.172	21.38	
7	3	Mohamad Siraj Tamim	Lebanon	0.206	21.80	PB
8	1	Oleg Juravlyov	Uzbekistan	0.145	22.31	
9	5	Juan Zeledon	Nicaragua	0.173	23.39	

==== Heat 6 ====
Rank	Lane	Athlete	Nation	Reaction	Time	Notes
1	3	Wallace Spearmon	United States	0.184	20.46	Q
2	4	Jaysuma Saidy Ndure	Norway	0.161	20.54	Q, SB
3	2	Paul Hession	Ireland	0.190	20.59	Q
4	8	Seth Amoo	Ghana	0.140	20.91	
5	7	Ronalds Arājs	Latvia	0.218	21.22	
6	5	Jayson Jones	Belize	0.162	21.54	
7	6	Nabie Foday Fofanah	Guinea	0.247	21.68	
—	9	Bryan Barnett	Canada	0.164	DNF	

==== Heat 7 ====
Rank	Lane	Athlete	Nation	Reaction	Time	Notes
1	6	Obinna Metu	Nigeria	0.168	20.62	Q
2	9	Ramil Guliyev	Azerbaijan	0.175	20.78	Q, SB
3	8	Churandy Martina	Netherlands Antilles	0.172	20.78	Q
4	4	Sandro Viana	Brazil	0.159	20.84	q
5	5	Jamial Rolle	Bahamas	0.162	20.93	
6	2	Shingo Suetsugu	Japan	0.185	20.93	
7	7	Omar Jouma Bilal Al-Salfa	United Arab Emirates	0.184	21.00	
—	3	Alexander Nelson	Great Britain	—	DNS	

==== Heat 8 ====
Rank	Lane	Athlete	Nation	Reaction	Time	Notes
1	6	Aaron Armstrong	Trinidad and Tobago	0.183	20.57	Q
2	8	Brendan Christian	Antigua and Barbuda	0.164	20.58	Q
3	7	Jared Connaughton	Canada	0.146	20.60	Q
4	9	Visa Hongisto	Finland	0.145	20.62	q, SB
5	3	Marco Cribari	Switzerland	0.171	20.98	
6	2	James Dolphin	New Zealand	0.161	20.98	
7	5	Zhang Peimeng	China	0.150	21.06	SB
—	4	Samuel Francis	Qatar	—	DNS	

=== Quarterfinals ===
The quarterfinals were held on 18 August. First 3 in each heat (Q) and the next 4 fastest (q) advance to the semifinals.

==== Quarterfinal 1 ====
Rank	Lane	Athlete	Nation	Reaction	Time	Notes
1	4	Usain Bolt	Jamaica	0.186	20.29	Q
2	7	Shawn Crawford	United States	0.198	20.42	Q
3	6	Kim Collins	Saint Kitts and Nevis	0.233	20.43	Q, SB
4	5	Marlon Devonish	Great Britain	0.146	20.43	q, SB
5	9	Jared Connaughton	Canada	0.151	20.45	q
6	3	Amr Seoud	Egypt	0.151	20.45	NR
7	8	Rolando Palacios	Honduras	0.248	20.87	
8	2	Ángel David Rodríguez	Spain	0.172	20.96	

==== Quarterfinal 2 ====
Rank	Lane	Athlete	Nation	Reaction	Time	Notes
1	4	Brian Dzingai	Zimbabwe	0.182	20.23	Q
2	7	Walter Dix	United States	0.162	20.27	Q
3	8	Christopher Williams	Jamaica	0.159	20.28	Q
4	6	Christian Malcolm	Great Britain	0.188	20.30	q, SB
5	9	Stephan Buckland	Mauritius	0.188	20.37	q, SB
6	5	Roman Smirnov	Russia	0.161	20.62	
7	3	Shinji Takahira	Japan	0.185	20.63	
8	2	Matic Osovnikar	Slovenia	0.171	20.95	

==== Quarterfinal 3 ====
Rank	Lane	Athlete	Nation	Reaction	Time	Notes
1	5	Brendan Christian	Antigua and Barbuda	0.166	20.26	Q
2	8	Churandy Martina	Netherlands Antilles	0.155	20.42	Q
3	9	Kristof Beyens	Belgium	0.155	20.50	Q
4	6	Marcin Jędrusiński	Poland	0.199	20.58	=SB
5	4	Aaron Armstrong	Trinidad and Tobago	0.155	20.58	
6	7	Obinna Metu	Nigeria	0.195	20.65	
7	2	Sandro Viana	Brazil	0.168	21.07	
8	3	Marc Schneeberger	Switzerland	0.156	21.48	

==== Quarterfinal 4 ====
Rank	Lane	Athlete	Nation	Reaction	Time	Notes
1	8	Paul Hession	Ireland	0.190	20.32	Q, SB
2	4	Wallace Spearmon	United States	0.202	20.39	Q
3	6	Jaysuma Saidy Ndure	Norway	0.131	20.45	Q, SB
4	7	Rondel Sorrillo	Trinidad and Tobago	0.164	20.63	
5	5	Ramil Guliyev	Azerbaijan	0.174	20.66	NR
6	3	Visa Hongisto	Finland	0.124	20.76	
7	2	Thuso Mpuang	South Africa	0.162	21.04	
—	9	Marvin Anderson	Jamaica	0.187	DNF	

=== Semifinals ===
The semifinals were held on 19 August. First 4 in each heat (Q) advance to the Final.

==== Semifinal 1 ====
Rank	Lane	Athlete	Nation	Reaction	Time	Notes
1	7	Churandy Martina	Netherlands Antilles	0.154	20.11	Q, NR
2	6	Brian Dzingai	Zimbabwe	0.184	20.17	Q, =SB
3	4	Walter Dix	United States	0.161	20.19	Q
4	3	Christian Malcolm	Great Britain	0.181	20.25	Q, SB
5	5	Paul Hession	Ireland	0.175	20.38	
6	9	Christopher Williams	Jamaica	0.217	20.45	
7	2	Jared Connaughton	Canada	0.146	20.58	
8	8	Kristof Beyens	Belgium	0.211	20.69	

==== Semifinal 2 ====
Rank	Lane	Athlete	Nation	Reaction	Time	Notes
1	6	Usain Bolt	Jamaica	0.175	20.09	Q
2	5	Shawn Crawford	United States	0.196	20.12	Q
3	7	Wallace Spearmon	United States	0.196	20.14	Q
4	8	Kim Collins	Saint Kitts and Nevis	0.191	20.25	Q, SB
5	4	Brendan Christian	Antigua and Barbuda	0.135	20.29	
6	2	Stephan Buckland	Mauritius	0.141	20.48	
7	3	Marlon Devonish	Great Britain	0.258	20.57	
—	9	Jaysuma Saidy Ndure	Norway	—	DNS	

=== Final ===
Rank	Lane	Athlete	Nation	Reaction	Time	Notes
1st place, gold medalist(s)	5	Usain Bolt	Jamaica	0.182	19.30	WR
2nd place, silver medalist(s)	4	Shawn Crawford	United States	0.210	19.96	
3rd place, bronze medalist(s)	8	Walter Dix	United States	0.151	19.98	
4	6	Brian Dzingai	Zimbabwe	0.185	20.22	
5	3	Christian Malcolm	Great Britain	0.212	20.40	
6	2	Kim Collins	Saint Kitts and Nevis	0.165	20.59	
—	7	Churandy Martina	Netherlands Antilles	0.144	~~19.82~~	DSQ
—	9	Wallace Spearmon	United States	0.167	~~19.95~~	DSQ
				Wind: -0.9 m/s		
