= Tiandra Ponteen =

Saint Kitts and Nevis sprinter (born 1984)

Medal record

Athletics

Representing Saint Kitts and Nevis

CAC Junior Championships (U20)
Bronze medal – third place	2002 Bridgetown	400 m
Bronze medal – third place	2002 Bridgetown	4x100 m relay

CAC Junior Championships (U17)
Silver medal – second place	2000 San Juan	200 m
Silver medal – second place	2000 San Juan	400 m

CARIFTA Games Junior (U20)
Gold medal – first place	2003 Port of Spain	200 m
Silver medal – second place	2001 Bridgetown	400 m
Silver medal – second place	2003 Port of Spain	400 m
Bronze medal – third place	2001 Bridgetown	200 m

CARIFTA Games Youth (U17)
Bronze medal – third place	1999 Fort-de-France	200 m
Bronze medal – third place	1999 Fort-de-France	400 m

Tiandra Tamika Ponteen (born 9 November 1984) is a Saint Kitts and Nevis sprinter who specializes in the 200 metres and the 400 metres.

She won the 400 metres silver medal at the 2005 Central American and Caribbean Championships. She reached the semi-final at the 1999 World Youth Championships, the 2002 World Junior Championships (in 200 m), the 2004 Olympic Games, the 2005 World Championships and the 2009 World Championships. She also competed at the 2000 World Junior Championships, the 2008 Olympic Games and the 2010 World Indoor Championships without progressing from the first round.

Her personal best times are 23.41 seconds in the 200 metres, achieved in April 2005 in Oxford; and 50.83 in the 400 metres, achieved in June 2005 in Sacramento. On the indoor track she has 23.24 seconds in the 200 metres, achieved in February 2006 in Fayetteville. She also holds the Saint Kitts record in the 4 x 100 metres relay, with 44.41 seconds achieved in July 2004 in Bogotá together with Carol Clarke, Nathandra John and Virgil Hodge.

Competing for the Florida Gators track and field team, Ponteen won the 2005 400 meters at the NCAA Division I Indoor Track and Field Championships in a time of 50.91 seconds.
