= Zahria Allers-Liburd =

Kittian sprinter (born 2002)

Personal information
- Born: 6 March 2002 (age 24)
- Height: 1.70 m (5 ft 7 in)

Sport
- Country: Saint Kitts and Nevis
- Sport: Athletics
- College team: USF

Achievements and titles
- Personal bests: 100 m: 11.43 (Tampa 2024); 200 m: 23.05 (Lexington 2024); 400 m: 53.82i (Chicago 2024)

Zahria Allers-Liburd (born 6 March 2002) is a Kittian sprinter. She competed at the 2024 Summer Olympics in the 100 m.

== Career ==
Competing for USF, Allers-Liburd competed at both the 2021 and 2024 Division 1 NCAA Championships, in the 4x100 m and 4x400 m relays respectively.

In 2024, Allers-Liburd won both the 100 m and 200 m titles at the Saint Kitts & Nevis Championships. She was selected to compete at the 2024 Summer Olympics in the 100 m via universality place. She won her preliminary round with a time of 11.89s to qualify for the heats where she was eliminated.

== Personal life ==
Allers-Liburd attended St. Thomas Aquinas for High School. She has a Medical Doctor degree from the University of Florida College of Medicine.
