= Kim Collins =

Saint Kitts and Nevis sprinter

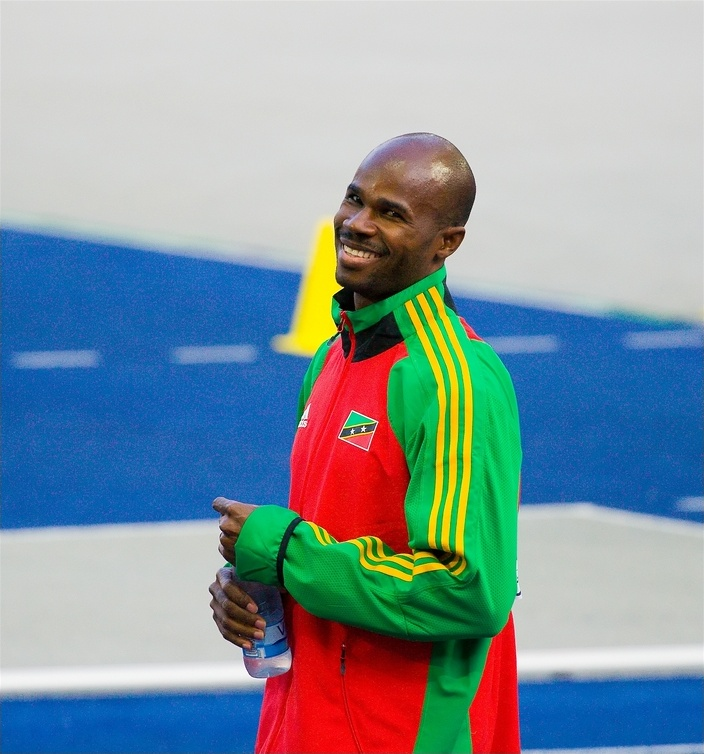

Personal information
- Nationality: Saint Kitts and Nevis
- Born: 5 April 1976 (age 50) Ogee's, Saint Peter Basseterre Parish, Saint Christopher-Nevis-Anguilla
- Height: 1.80 m (5 ft 11 in)
- Weight: 77 kg (170 lb)

Sport
- Sport: Running

Achievements and titles
- Personal bests: 60 m: 6.47; 100 m: 9.93; 200 m: 20.20
Medal record
Men's athletics
Representing Saint Kitts and Nevis
World Championships
| Gold medal – first place | 2003 Paris | 100 m |
| Bronze medal – third place | 2001 Edmonton | 200 m |
| Bronze medal – third place | 2005 Helsinki | 100 m |
| Bronze medal – third place | 2011 Daegu | 100 m |
| Bronze medal – third place | 2011 Daegu | 4 × 100 m |
World Indoor Championships
| Silver medal – second place | 2003 Birmingham | 60 m |
| Silver medal – second place | 2008 Valencia | 60 m |
Commonwealth Games
| Gold medal – first place | 2002 Manchester | 100 m |
Pan American Games
| Silver medal – second place | 2011 Guadalajara | 100 m |
CAC Championships
| Gold medal – first place | 2001 Guatemala City | 100 m |
| Gold medal – first place | 2001 Guatemala City | 200 m |
| Gold medal – first place | 2003 St George's | 100 m |
| Silver medal – second place | 1999 Bridgetown | 100 m |
| Silver medal – second place | 1999 Bridgetown | 4 × 100 m relay |
| Bronze medal – third place | 2011 Mayagüez | 4 × 100 m relay |
Representing Americas
Continental Cup/World Cup
| Silver medal – second place | 2002 Madrid | 100 m |
| Gold medal – first place | 2014 Marrakesh | 4 × 100 m relay |
| Bronze medal – third place | 2014 Marrakesh | 4 × 400 m relay |

Kim Collins (born 5 April 1976) is a Kittitian former track and field sprinter. In 2003, he became the World Champion in the 100 metres. He represented his country at the Summer Olympics on five occasions, from 1996 to 2016, and was the country's first athlete to reach an Olympic final. He competed at ten editions of the World Championships in Athletics, from 1995 to 2015, winning five medals. He was a twice runner-up in the 60 metres at the IAAF World Indoor Championships (2003, 2008). At regional level, he was a gold medallist at the Commonwealth Games and a silver medallist at the Pan American Games. As of 2023, he is the only individual world champion from Saint Kitts and Nevis.

Collins holds a personal best of 9.93 seconds for the 100 m, which is a Saint Kitts and Nevis national record and a M40 world record for men over 40. This makes him the only man over forty years of age to break the 10-second barrier. His indoor personal best of 6.47 seconds for the 60 m is a national record and a M35 world record.

Collins was the bronze medallist over 200 m at the 2001 World Championships in Athletics and became the 100 m champion at the 2002 Commonwealth Games. He won a silver medal over 60 metres at the 2003 IAAF World Indoor Championships, before going on to take his outdoor crown. He also won sprint medals at the 2005 World Championships, 2008 IAAF World Indoor Championships and 2011 World Championships. A dispute with the Saint Kitts and Nevis administrators saw Collins dropped from the 2012 Olympic Games and he did not return to international duty until 2015.

== Biography ==
Collins competed in college for Texas Christian University. He competed on behalf of his country in the 1996, 2000, 2004, 2008, and 2016 Summer Olympics.

Collins made his debut at major championship at the 1996 Olympics, where he qualified for the second round in the 100 m. He improved quickly, and at the 2000 Summer Olympics, he became the first athlete from his nation to qualify for an Olympic final, finishing 7th in the 100 m. The next year, Collins would win St. Kitts' first World Championship medal, when he tied for the bronze medal in the 200 m.

At the 2002 Commonwealth Games, he won his first major title. After the 100 m race, which Collins won after two other favourites pulled out of the final with injuries, he failed a doping test, testing positive for the beta agonist Salbutamol. However, it was found that the banned substance was part of the asthma medication Collins had been taking for several years, but had neglected to mention to the medical commission. Collins eventually was allowed to keep his title, and got away with a warning.

Collins was featured on a set of two stamps from St Kitts issued in 2002.

The 100 m at the 2003 World Championships became the biggest triumph of his career. With Olympic and World Champion Maurice Greene eliminated in the semi-finals, the field was wide open. In a very close race, where the top four athletes finished within 0.02 seconds, Collins won and became the first world champion from Saint Kitts and Nevis.

At the 2004 Olympics, Collins again made the final of the 100, finishing 6th. At the 2005 World Championships, Collins claimed a bronze medal in the 100 m behind Justin Gatlin and Michael Frater though he was given the same time as the latter.

Finishing fourth in his heat, Collins qualified for the finals in the men's 200 m race in the 2008 Beijing Olympics and finished in sixth place on 20 August 2008. He competed at the 2009 World Championships and reached the quarter-finals of the competition, but he was eliminated after finishing in fourth place behind eventual finalists Asafa Powell, Darvis Patton and Marc Burns. He announced his retirement from international athletics in September that year, bringing an end to a career that spanned almost 17 years.

Collins returned to athletics on 29 January 2011 at the Aviva International Match in Glasgow, reversing his retirement at the age of 34, and he finished fourth in the 200 metres. He then won at the Russian Winter Meeting in Moscow. He set a 60 m personal best and national record of 6.52 seconds to win at the PSD Bank Meeting in Düsseldorf, overhauling his best mark which he had set nearly eleven years earlier. That time did not stand for as long, however, as he ran 6.50 seconds in the heats of the BW-Bank Meeting a few days later. Collins won both his heat and semi-final races in the 100 m at the 2011 World Championships before finishing third and winning a bronze medal in the final after the disqualification of Usain Bolt. At the men's 4 × 100 m relay qualifying heats, Collins ran the second leg for the St Kitts and Nevis relay squad and helped clock a national record of 38.47, leading to St. Kitts and Nevis' first-ever final. The last event saw Collins team up with Jason Rogers, Antoine Adams and Brijesh Lawrence to clock 38.49 to win the bronze medal.

At the XVI PanAmerican Games in Guadalajara 2011, Collins broke the 28-year-old PanAmerican Games record with a time of 10.00 in the early heat. He finished second in the finals to Jamaica's Lerone Clarke. His silver medal was the first-ever medal for St. Kitts and Nevis at the Pan-Am Games.

Collins was expelled by his team from the 2012 Summer Olympics in London on 4 August 2012 for missing training sessions. He said he was being punished for spending time with his wife.

Collins was the oldest sprinter at 2016 Summer Olympics, his fifth consecutive appearance at the Olympics. While most sprinters peak in their 20s, Collins set his personal record after reaching the age of 40, and became the first individual to run a sub-10 second 100 m dash in the process. He ran a 9.93 100 m dash, which was fast enough to qualify for Rio de Janeiro. He competed in both the 100 m sprint and 4 × 100 m relay. Collins was the only St. Kitts and Nevis athlete to make it out of the first round. He finished his heat with a time of 10.18 and fourth place. He improved his time in the semifinals, finishing with a time of 10.12. This put him in sixth place and he did not advance to the finals.

In 2018 Collins announced his retirement, he competed at the 60 m at the 2018 IAAF World Indoor Championships. His last performance at a World Championship.

25 August was declared Kim Collins Day by the government of St. Kitts and Nevis in honour of Collins’ gold at the World Championships in Paris, France in 2003.

== Statistics ==
=== Personal bests ===
| Event | Environment | Time (sec) | Record | Wind (m/s) | Date | Competition | Venue | Location | Country |
|---|---|---|---|---|---|---|---|---|---|
| 50 metres | Indoor | 5.75 | | —N/a | 10 February 2009 | Meeting Pas de Calais | Arena Stade Couvert de Liévin | Liévin | France |
| 55 metres | Indoor | 6.24 | | —N/a | 24 February 2001 | WAC Indoor Championships | Reno Livestock Events Center | Reno, Nevada | United States |
| 60 metres | Indoor | 6.47 | NR | —N/a | 17 February 2015 | Pedro's Cup | Atlas Arena | Łódź | Poland |
| 60 metres | Outdoor | 6.48 | NR | +0.3 | 29 July 2014 | Grand Prix of Cheb | Atletický Stadion Cheb | Cheb | Czech Republic |
| 100 metres | Outdoor | 9.93 | NR | +1.9 | 29 May 2016 | NRW-Gala Bottrop | Jahnstadion | Bottrop | Germany |
| 200 metres | Outdoor | 20.20 | | +0.1 | 9 August 2001 | World Championships | Commonwealth Stadium | Edmonton | Canada |
| 400 metres | Outdoor | 46.93 | | —N/a | 22 April 2000 | TCU Invitational | Lowdon Track and Field Complex | Fort Worth, Texas | United States |
| 4 × 100 metres relay | Outdoor | 37.97 | | —N/a | 13 September 2014 | Continental Cup | Stade de Marrakech | Marrakesh | Morocco |

- All information from IAAF Profile

=== Seasonal bests ===
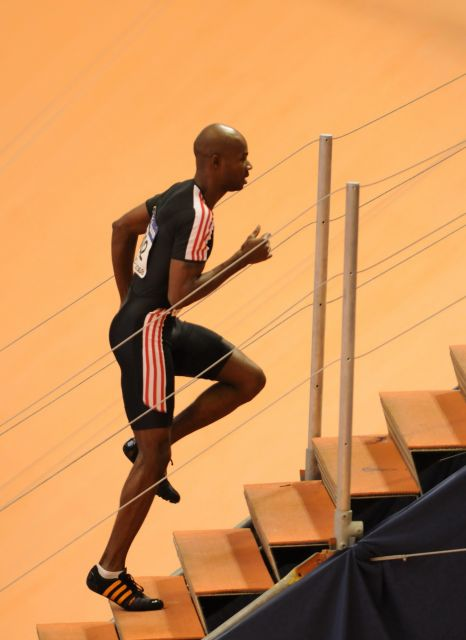
Kim Collins during World Indoor Championships 2008 in Valencia

View source data.

=== International competition record ===
| Year | Competition | Venue | Position | Event | Notes |
|---|---|---|---|---|---|
| 1995 | CARIFTA Games (U20) | George Town, Cayman Islands | 3rd | 100 m | 10.75 |
| 1995 | Pan American Junior Championships | Santiago, Chile | 2nd | 100 m | 10.4 |
| 1995 | Pan American Junior Championships | Santiago, Chile | DNS (f) | 200 m | — |
| 1995 | World Championships | Gothenburg, Sweden | 6th (h) | 4 × 100 m relay | 40.12 |
| 1996 | Olympic Games | Atlanta, United States | 5th (qf) | 100 m | 10.34 |
| 1996 | Olympic Games | Atlanta, United States | 4th (h) | 4 × 100 m relay | 40.12 |
| 1997 | World Championships | Athens, Greece | 8th (h) | 200 m | 21.73 |
| 1998 | Central American and Caribbean Games | Maracaibo, Venezuela | 23rd (sf) | 100 m | 10.77 |
| 1998 | Central American and Caribbean Games | Maracaibo, Venezuela | 18th (h) | 200 m | 22.37 |
| 1999 | Central American and Caribbean Championships | Bridgetown, Barbados | 2nd | 100 m | 10.31 |
| 1999 | Central American and Caribbean Championships | Bridgetown, Barbados | 2nd | 4 × 100 m relay | 40.83 |
| 1999 | World Championships | Seville, Spain | 4th (h) | 100 m | 10.50 |
| 1999 | World Championships | Seville, Spain | 6th (h) | 200 m | 20.95 |
| 2000 | NACAC Under-25 Championships | Monterrey, Mexico | 1st | 100 m | 10.46 |
| 2000 | NACAC Under-25 Championships | Monterrey, Mexico | 1st | 200 m | 20.53 |
| 2000 | Olympic Games | Sydney, Australia | 7th | 100 m | 10.17 |
| 2000 | Olympic Games | Sydney, Australia | 5th (semis) | 200 m | 20.57 |
| 2001 | Central American and Caribbean Championships | Guatemala City, Guatemala | 1st | 100 m | 10.04 |
| 2001 | Central American and Caribbean Championships | Guatemala City, Guatemala | 1st | 200 m | 20.55 |
| 2001 | World Championships | Edmonton, Canada | 5th | 100 m | 10.07 |
| 2001 | World Championships | Edmonton, Canada | 3rd | 200 m | 20.20 |
| 2002 | Commonwealth Games | Manchester, United Kingdom | 1st | 100 m | 9.98 |
| 2002 | World Cup | Madrid, Spain | 2nd | 100 m | 10.06 |
| 2002 | World Cup | Madrid, Spain | 2nd | 4 × 100 m relay | 38.32 |
| 2003 | World Indoor Championships | Birmingham, United Kingdom | 2nd | 60 m | 6.53 |
| 2003 | Central American and Caribbean Championships | St. George's, Grenada | 1st | 100 m | 10.13 |
| 2003 | Central American and Caribbean Championships | St. George's, Grenada | DNS (f) | 200 m | - |
| 2003 | Central American and Caribbean Championships | St. George's, Grenada | 5th | 4 × 100 m relay | 39.88 |
| 2003 | World Championships | Saint-Denis, France | 1st | 100 m | 10.07 |
| 2004 | Olympic Games | Athens, Greece | 6th | 100 m | 10.00 |
| 2005 | World Championships | Helsinki, Finland | 3rd | 100 m | 10.05 |
| 2007 | Pan American Games | Rio de Janeiro, Brazil | 5th | 100 m | 10.31 |
| 2007 | Pan American Games | Rio de Janeiro, Brazil | 8th | 4 × 100 m relay | 40.20 |
| 2007 | World Championships | Osaka, Japan | 5th (sf) | 100 m | 10.21 |
| 2008 | World Indoor Championships | Valencia, Spain | 2nd | 60 m | 6.54 |
| 2008 | Olympic Games | Beijing, China | 5th (sf) | 100 m | 10.05 |
| 2008 | Olympic Games | Beijing, China | 6th | 200 m | 20.59 |
| 2009 | World Championships | Berlin, Germany | 4th (qf) | 100 m | 10.20 |
| 2009 | World Championships | Berlin, Germany | 6th (qf) | 200 m | 20.84 |
| 2011 | Central American and Caribbean Games | Mayagüez, Puerto Rico | 3rd | 4 × 100 m relay | 39.07 |
| 2011 | World Championships | Daegu, South Korea | 3rd | 100 m | 10.09 |
| 2011 | World Championships | Daegu, South Korea | 4th (semis) | 200 m | 20.64 |
| 2011 | World Championships | Daegu, South Korea | 3rd | 4 × 100 m relay | 38.49 |
| 2011 | Pan American Games | Guadalajara, Mexico | 2nd | 100 m | 10.04 |
| 2012 | Olympic Games | London, United Kingdom | DNS | 100 m | - |
| 2014 | Continental Cup | Marrakesh, Morocco | 1st | 4 × 100 m relay | 37.97 |
| 2014 | Continental Cup | Marrakesh, Morocco | 3rd | 4 × 400 m relay | 3:02.78 |
| 2015 | World Championships | Beijing, China | 26th (h) | 100 m | 10.16 |
| 2016 | World Indoor Championships | Portland, United States | 8th | 60 m | 6.56 |
| 2016 | Olympic Games | Rio de Janeiro, Brazil | 17th (sf) | 100 m | 10.12 |
| 2016 | Olympic Games | Rio de Janeiro, Brazil | 15th (h) | 4 × 100 m relay | 39.81 |
| 2018 | World Indoor Championships | Birmingham, United Kingdom | 24th (h) | 60 m | 6.77 |

- 2002 IAAF Grand Prix Final runner-up
- 2003 IAAF World Athletics Final fifth placer
- 2004 IAAF World Athletics Final fifth placer
- 2008 IAAF World Athletics Final fourth placer

== National titles ==
- NCAA Division I Men's Indoor Track and Field Championships
  - 60 m: 2001
  - 200 m: 2001
- NCAA Division I Men's Outdoor Track and Field Championships
  - 4 × 100 m relay: 2001

== Circuit wins ==
60 metres

- Russian Winter Meeting: 2011, 2013, 2015
- PSD Bank Meeting: 2011, 2015, 2016
- ISTAF Indoor: 2014, 2015, 2016
- Copernicus Cup: 2015
- Pedro's Cup: 2015
- Birmingham Indoor Grand Prix: 2015
- Malmö Games: 2015

100 metres

- Vardinogianneia: 2001
- Athletissima: 2001
- Bélem Grand Premio Brasil de Atletismo: 2002
- Żywiec Cup: 2002, 2003
- Prefontaine Classic: 2002, 2003
- DN Galan: 2002
- Adidas Track Classic: 2003
- London Grand Prix: 2003
- British Grand Prix: 2004, 2005, 2016
- Brothers Znamensky Memorial: 2008
- Meeting Lille Métropole: 2008
- Kawasaki Super Meet: 2011
- FBK Games: 2011
- Janusz Kusociński Memorial: 2011
- Meeting International de Sotteville-lès-Rouen: 2012
- Great CityGames Manchester: 2013, 2016
- Meeting Grand Prix IAAF de Dakar: 2013
- Ostrava Golden Spike: 2013
- Gyulai István Memorial: 2013, 2014
- Meeting International Mohammed VI d'Athlétisme de Rabat: 2014
- Berlin ISTAF: 2015, 2016

200 metres

- Vardinogianneia: 2001

4 × 100 metres relay

- DN Galan: 2007

=== Track records ===
As of September 2024, Collins holds the following track records for 100 metres and 200 metres.

==== 100 metres ====
| Location | Time | Windspeed m/s | Date | Notes |
|---|---|---|---|---|
| Basseterre | 9.94 | +3.4 | 13/06/2015 | |
| Wattenscheid | 10.08 | +2.3 | 02/08/2009 | |
| Bottrop | 9.93; NR | +1.9 | 29/05/2016 | |
| Guatemala City | 10.04 | –0.2 | 20/07/2001 | |
| Kumagaya | 10.01 | +2.3 | 06/09/2016 | |
| Tomblaine | 9.96 | +2.4 | 08/07/2012 | Track record shared with Mike Rodgers (USA) from the same race. |

==== 200 metres ====
| Location | Time | Windspeed m/s | Date |
|---|---|---|---|
| Gold Coast | 20.37 | +2.1 | 10/09/2000 |

== See also ==
- 100 metres at the Olympics
- List of World Championships in Athletics medalists (men)
- List of IAAF World Indoor Championships medalists (men)
- List of Commonwealth Games medallists in athletics (men)
- List of Pan American Games medalists in athletics (men)
- List of 2011 Pan American Games medalists
- List of men's Olympic and World Championship athletics sprint champions
- Afro-Kittitian and Nevisian
- List of masters athletes
- List of athletes with the most appearances at Olympic Games
- List of Pan American Games records in athletics

Olympic Games
| Preceded by Diane Francis; Virgil Hodge | Flagbearer for Saint Kitts and Nevis; 2000 Sydney, 2004 Athens; 2012 London | Succeeded by Virgil Hodge; Antoine Adams |
