= 2009 World Championships in Athletics – Men's 100 metres =

Men's 100 metres at the 2009 World Championships
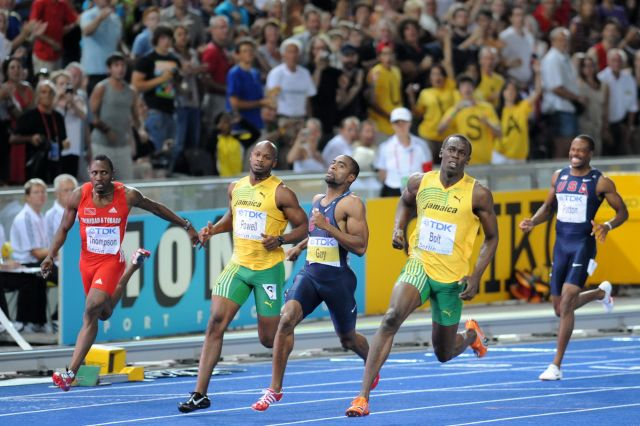
- Usain Bolt (center right) wins his first world title in world record time.
- Venue: Olympiastadion (Berlin)
- Dates: 15 August (heats and quarter-finals); 16 August (semi-finals and final)
- Competitors: 90
- Winning time: 9.58 WR

Medalists
gold medal	Usain Bolt	Jamaica
silver medal	Tyson Gay	United States
bronze medal	Asafa Powell	Jamaica

Official Video

The men's 100 metres at the 2009 World Championships in Athletics were held at the Olympic Stadium on August 15 and August 16. The two main contenders for the event were the reigning World Champion Tyson Gay and Usain Bolt, the reigning Olympic champion and world record holder. Gay entered the competition with a season's best of 9.77 seconds (an American record) while Bolt's season's best was 9.79 seconds. Four other competitors had broken the 10-second barrier during the last months before the World Championship: former world record holder Asafa Powell, Olympic finalist Churandy Martina and emerging sprinters Daniel Bailey and Mike Rodgers.

The first day saw a number of high-profile athletes eliminated; Derrick Atkins, the 2007 silver medallist, did not pass the first round. Churandy Martina, area record holders Samuel Francis and Olusoji Fasuba, Simeon Williamson, and 2003 gold medallist Kim Collins were all knocked out in the quarter-finals. Also, a double false start meant disqualification for the new European junior record holder Christophe Lemaitre. Gay, Powell and Rodgers ended with the fastest times of the day, although Bolt and Bailey comfortably won heat five, exchanging smiles and glances in the process. The semi-finals saw Bolt—typically slow out of the blocks—false start for the first time over 100 m, but he eventually finished in 9.89 seconds (the fastest ever semi-final). Six of the eight qualifying athletes broke 10 seconds, and US champion Rodgers was the biggest name not to qualify.

The final, which was advertised in Berlin as "Das Duell" between Gay and Bolt, proved to be historic. By the 20-metre mark, Bolt had already taken a slight lead of 0.01 seconds, and he continued to pull away from the rest of the pack until the finish. He finished in a world record-breaking time of 9.58 seconds, beating Gay by some distance, even though the American had run 9.71 seconds, which was the third fastest time ever. Bolt beat his own previous mark that he set when winning gold at the 2008 Summer Olympics in Beijing by over a tenth of a second, an achievement statisticians claimed was 20 years ahead of schedule in the long term scheme of the 100 metres world record progression. So emphatic was Bolt's winning time, that both bronze medal winner Powell and sixth placed Dwain Chambers said they were happy just taking part in the fastest race in history.

They get away first time. Tyson Gay right alongside Usain Bolt, but here he goes, streaking away already. It's Bolt all the way, he's looking 'round at Gay. Watch the clock – it's gold for Bolt! And again! He's done it again! A new world record for Usain Bolt! They say lightning doesn't strike twice! Can you believe it? He is flying!

The world belongs to Bolt, Berlin belongs to Bolt; 9.58, stunning, absolutely stunning! Gay was good – he was very, very good...there are adjectives which are inadequate to describe this man. He is brilliant beyond compare. We have seen nothing like this, ever, ever. He writes his own history with every stride that he takes. He is a star beyond compare, a talent beyond compare...frightening, absolutely frightening.

— Steve Cram on the BBC television broadcast of the final

== Records ==
Prior to the competition, the records were as follows:

World record	Usain Bolt (JAM)	9.69	Beijing, China	16 August 2008
Championship record	Maurice Greene (USA)	9.80	Seville, Spain	22 August 1999
World Leading	Tyson Gay (USA)	9.77	Rome, Italy	10 July 2009
African record	Olusoji Fasuba (NGR)	9.85	Doha, Qatar	12 May 2006
Asian record	Samuel Francis (QAT)	9.99	Amman, Jordan	26 July 2007
North American record	Usain Bolt (JAM)	9.69	Beijing, China	16 August 2008
South American record	Robson da Silva (BRA)	10.00	Mexico, Mexico	22 July 1988
European record	Francis Obikwelu (POR)	9.86	Athens, Greece	22 August 2004
Oceanian record	Patrick Johnson (AUS)	9.93	Mito, Japan	5 May 2003

The following new world championship and North American records were set during the competition.

Date	Event	Athlete	Time	Notes
16 August	Final	Usain Bolt (JAM)	9.58 s	WR, CR, WL

== Qualification standards ==
A time	B time
10.21	10.28

== Schedule ==
Date	Time	Round
August 15, 2009	11:40	Heats
August 15, 2009	18:50	Quarterfinals
August 16, 2009	19:10	Semifinals
August 16, 2009	21:35	Final

== Results ==
KEY:	q	Fastest non-qualifiers	Q	Qualified	NR	National record	PB	Personal best	SB	Seasonal best

=== Heats ===
Qualification: First 3 in each heat (Q) and the next 4 fastest (q) advance to the quarterfinals.

Rank	Heat	Name	Nationality	Time	Notes
1	11	Tyson Gay	United States	10.16	Q
2	4	Dwain Chambers	Great Britain & N.I.	10.18	Q
3	9	Usain Bolt	Jamaica	10.20	Q
4	8	Samuel Francis	Qatar	10.21	Q
5	6	Christophe Lemaitre	France	10.23	Q
6	8	Emmanuel Callander	Trinidad and Tobago	10.24	Q
7	12	Michael Rodgers	United States	10.25	Q
8	5	Daniel Bailey	Antigua and Barbuda	10.26	Q
8	2	Darvis Patton	United States	10.26	Q
8	8	Churandy Martina	Netherlands Antilles	10.26	Q
11	8	Daniel Grueso	Colombia	10.27	q
12	3	Martial Mbandjock	France	10.28	Q
12	11	Kim Collins	Saint Kitts and Nevis	10.28	Q
12	12	Naoki Tsukahara	Japan	10.28	Q
12	8	Rolando Palacios	Honduras	10.28	q, SB
16	1	Michael Frater	Jamaica	10.30	Q
16	7	Andrew Hinds	Barbados	10.30	Q
16	9	Gerald Phiri	Zambia	10.30	Q
16	9	Egwero Ogho-Oghene	Nigeria	10.30	Q
20	4	Olusoji Fasuba	Nigeria	10.31	Q
21	4	Monzavous Edwards	United States	10.32	Q
22	7	Simeon Williamson	Great Britain & N.I.	10.34	Q
23	2	Emanuele Di Gregorio	Italy	10.35	Q
23	5	Jaysuma Saidy Ndure	Norway	10.35	Q
23	12	Adam Harris	Guyana	10.35	Q
23	7	Ronald Pognon	France	10.35	Q
23	7	Martin Keller	Germany	10.35	q, SB
28	10	Richard Thompson	Trinidad and Tobago	10.36	Q
28	11	Fabio Cerutti	Italy	10.36	Q
30	5	Adrian Griffith	Bahamas	10.37	Q
31	3	Obinna Metu	Nigeria	10.38	Q
31	2	Masashi Eriguchi	Japan	10.38	Q
31	3	Asafa Powell	Jamaica	10.38	Q
34	6	Marc Burns	Trinidad and Tobago	10.39	Q
34	7	Ángel David Rodríguez	Spain	10.39	q, SB
36	3	Aziz Ouhadi	Morocco	10.40	
37	1	Arnaldo Abrantes	Portugal	10.41	Q
37	2	Barakat Al-Harthi	Oman	10.41	
37	4	Ben Youssef Meité	Ivory Coast	10.41	
40	10	Tyrone Edgar	Great Britain & N.I.	10.42	Q
40	9	Bryan Barnett	Canada	10.42	
40	5	Tobias Unger	Germany	10.42	
43	3	Derrick Atkins	Bahamas	10.44	
44	6	Dariusz Kuć	Poland	10.46	Q
44	5	Adrian Durant	U.S. Virgin Islands	10.46	
46	1	Shintaro Kimura	Japan	10.47	Q
46	12	Ramon Gittens	Barbados	10.47	
48	1	Simone Collio	Italy	10.49	
49	2	Stefan Schwab	Germany	10.50	
50	12	Cédric Nabe	Switzerland	10.51	
51	1	Matic Osovnikar	Slovenia	10.52	
52	4	Shehan Abeypitiyage	Sri Lanka	10.53	
53	10	Simon Magakwe	South Africa	10.54	Q
53	7	Basílio de Moraes Júnior	Brazil	10.54	
55	9	José Carlos Moreira	Brazil	10.55	
55	1	Béranger Aymard Bosse	Central African Republic	10.55	
57	10	Aziz Zakari	Ghana	10.57	
58	6	Ryan Moseley	Austria	10.58	
59	11	Kemar Hyman	Cayman Islands	10.59	
60	4	Wilfried Bingangoye	Gabon	10.62	
61	2	Liaquat Ali	Pakistan	10.64	
62	6	Franklin Nazareno	Ecuador	10.71	
63	11	Carlos Jorge	Dominican Republic	10.73	
64	10	Idrissa Sanou	Burkina Faso	10.74	
65	8	Fernando Lumain	Indonesia	10.76	
66	6	Chi Ho Tsui	Hong Kong	10.77	
67	10	Mhadjou Youssouf	Comoros	10.89	SB
68	12	Danny D'Souza	Seychelles	10.92	
69	1	Jack Iroga	Solomon Islands	10.98	SB
70	8	Hussain Haleem	Maldives	11.00	NR
71	8	Suwaibou Sanneh	Gambia	11.02	SB
72	10	Desislav Gunev	Bulgaria	11.07	
73	4	Mohamed Faisal	Brunei	11.12	PB
74	2	Oumar Bella Bah	Guinea	11.20	PB
75	3	Ivano Bucci	San Marino	11.24	
75	5	Jurgen Themen	Suriname	11.24	
77	7	Denvil Ruan	Anguilla	11.31	PB
78	9	Aisea Tohi	Tonga	11.32	
78	6	Mohamed Masudul Karim	Bangladesh	11.32	SB
80	11	Aaron Victorian	American Samoa	11.37	PB
81	11	Tiraa Arere	Cook Islands	11.55	
82	9	Okilani Tinilau	Tuvalu	11.57	SB
83	3	Leon Mengloi	Palau	11.60	PB
84	7	Soulisack Silisavadymao	Laos	11.66	SB
85	10	Nooa Takooa	Kiribati	11.74	PB
86	6	Quaski Itaia	Nauru	11.76	SB
87	5	Yondan Namelo	Federated States of Micronesia	11.78	PB
88	4	Masoud Azizi	Afghanistan	11.79	SB
89	12	Phillip Poznanski	Marshall Islands	11.97	PB
90	12	Clayton Kenty	Northern Mariana Islands	12.29	PB
	1	Dominic Carroll	Gibraltar	DNF	
	2	Delivert Arsene Kimbembe	Congo	DNS	

=== Quarterfinals ===
Qualification: First 3 in each heat(Q) and the next 1 fastest(q) advance to the semifinals.

Rank	Heat	Name	Nationality	Time	Notes
1	3	Asafa Powell	Jamaica	9.95	Q
2	4	Tyson Gay	United States	9.98	Q
3	2	Michael Rodgers	United States	10.01	Q
4	5	Daniel Bailey	Antigua and Barbuda	10.02	Q
5	5	Usain Bolt	Jamaica	10.03	Q
6	1	Dwain Chambers	Great Britain & N.I.	10.04	Q, SB
7	3	Darvis Patton	United States	10.05	Q
8	1	Richard Thompson	Trinidad and Tobago	10.08	Q
9	4	Michael Frater	Jamaica	10.09	Q
10	2	Tyrone Edgar	Great Britain & N.I.	10.12	Q
10	3	Marc Burns	Trinidad and Tobago	10.12	Q
12	5	Monzavous Edwards	United States	10.15	Q
12	2	Naoki Tsukahara	Japan	10.15	Q
14	4	Jaysuma Saidy Ndure	Norway	10.16	Q
14	2	Gerald Phiri	Zambia	10.16	q, NR
16	5	Churandy Martina	Netherlands Antilles	10.19	
16	2	Egwero Ogho-Oghene	Nigeria	10.19	
18	3	Kim Collins	Saint Kitts and Nevis	10.20	
18	3	Samuel Francis	Qatar	10.20	
20	1	Martial Mbandjock	France	10.22	Q
21	4	Andrew Hinds	Barbados	10.23	
21	5	Simeon Williamson	Great Britain & N.I.	10.23	
23	5	Rolando Palacios	Honduras	10.24	SB
24	3	Olusoji Fasuba	Nigeria	10.25	
25	1	Emanuele Di Gregorio	Italy	10.26	
26	5	Emmanuel Callander	Trinidad and Tobago	10.27	
26	3	Ronald Pognon	France	10.27	
28	4	Adrian Griffith	Bahamas	10.28	
29	4	Obinna Metu	Nigeria	10.36	
30	4	Fabio Cerutti	Italy	10.37	
31	5	Dariusz Kuć	Poland	10.38	
32	1	Adam Harris	Guyana	10.39	
32	4	Ángel David Rodríguez	Spain	10.39	SB
34	1	Arnaldo Abrantes	Portugal	10.40	
34	1	Martin Keller	Germany	10.40	
36	1	Masashi Eriguchi	Japan	10.45	
37	3	Shintaro Kimura	Japan	10.54	
38	2	Simon Magakwe	South Africa	10.71	
	2	Christophe Lemaitre	France	DSQ	
	2	Daniel Grueso	Colombia	DSQ	

=== Semifinals ===
First 4 of each Semifinal will be directly qualified(Q) for the Finals.

==== Semifinal 1 ====
Rank	Lane	Name	Nationality	React	Time	Notes
1	6	Usain Bolt	Jamaica	0.135	9.89	Q
2	4	Daniel Bailey	Antigua and Barbuda	0.135	9.96	Q
3	3	Darvis Patton	United States	0.152	9.98	Q, SB
4	8	Marc Burns	Trinidad and Tobago	0.159	10.01	Q, SB
5	5	Michael Rodgers	United States	0.154	10.04	
6	1	Martial Mbandjock	France	0.138	10.18	
7	2	Jaysuma Saidy Ndure	Norway	0.143	10.20	
	7	Tyrone Edgar	Great Britain & N.I.		DSQ	

==== Semifinal 2 ====
Rank	Lane	Name	Nationality	React	Time	Notes
1	5	Tyson Gay	United States	0.143	9.93	Q
2	4	Asafa Powell	Jamaica	0.133	9.95	Q
3	3	Richard Thompson	Trinidad and Tobago	0.132	9.98	Q, SB
4	6	Dwain Chambers	Great Britain & N.I.	0.182	10.04	Q, SB
5	7	Michael Frater	Jamaica	0.153	10.14	
6	2	Monzavous Edwards	United States	0.146	10.14	
7	1	Gerald Phiri	Zambia	0.143	10.19	
8	8	Naoki Tsukahara	Japan	0.152	10.25	

=== Final ===
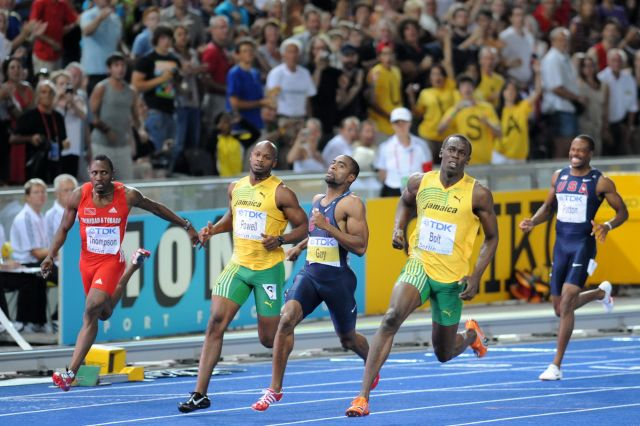
Usain Bolt (center right) defeating all opposition to win his first world title

Rank	Lane	Name	Nationality	React	Time	Notes
1st place, gold medalist(s)	4	Usain Bolt	Jamaica	0.146	9.58	WR
2nd place, silver medalist(s)	5	Tyson Gay	United States	0.144	9.71	NR
3rd place, bronze medalist(s)	6	Asafa Powell	Jamaica	0.134	9.84	SB
4	3	Daniel Bailey	Antigua and Barbuda	0.129	9.93	
5	8	Richard Thompson	Trinidad and Tobago	0.119	9.93	SB
6	1	Dwain Chambers	Great Britain & N.I.	0.121	10.00	SB
7	2	Marc Burns	Trinidad and Tobago	0.165	10.00	SB
8	7	Darvis Patton	United States	0.149	10.34	
