= Trinidad and Tobago at the 2025 World Athletics Championships =

- Flag of Trinidad and Tobago
- WA code: TTO

in Tokyo, Japan 13 September 2025 – 21 September 2025
- Competitors: 4 (2 men and 2 women)
- Medals Ranked 14th: Gold 1 Silver 1 Bronze 0 Total 2

World Athletics Championships appearances
- 1983; 1987; 1991; 1993; 1995; 1997; 1999; 2001; 2003; 2005; 2007; 2009; 2011; 2013; 2015; 2017; 2019; 2022; 2023; 2025

Trinidad and Tobago competed at the 2025 World Athletics Championships in Tokyo, Japan, from 13 to 21 September 2025.

== Medallists ==
Medal	Athlete	Event	Date
Gold	Keshorn Walcott	Men's javelin throw	September 18
Silver	Jereem Richards	Men's 400 metres	September 18

== Results ==
Trinidad and Tobago entered 4 athletes to the championships.

Key

- Q = Qualified for the next round
- q = Qualified for the next round as a fastest loser or, in field events, by position without achieving the qualifying target
- NR = National record
- PB = Personal best
- SB = Season best
- N/A = Round not applicable for the event

=== Men ===
Track and road events

Athlete	Event	Heat		Semifinal		Final	
Athlete	Event	Result	Rank	Result	Rank	Result	Rank
Jereem Richards	400 metres	44.64	1 Q	44.12 SB	3 q	43.72 NR	2nd place, silver medalist(s)

Field events

Athlete	Event	Qualification		Final	
Athlete	Event	Distance	Position	Distance	Position
Keshorn Walcott	Javelin throw	83.93	9 q	88.16 SB	1st place, gold medalist(s)

=== Women ===
Track and road events

Athlete	Event	Heat		Semifinal		Final	
Athlete	Event	Result	Rank	Result	Rank	Result	Rank
Leah Bertrand	100 metres	11.29	4	Did not advance			
Leah Bertrand	200 metres	23.33	6	Did not advance			

Field events

Athlete	Event	Qualification		Final	
Athlete	Event	Distance	Position	Distance	Position
Tyra Gittens-Spotsville	Long jump	6.05	32	Did not advance	
