= Saint Kitts and Nevis at the 2022 World Athletics Championships =

- Flag of Saint Kitts and Nevis
- WA code: SKN

in Eugene, United States 15 July 2022 – 24 July 2022
- Competitors: 1 (1 woman)
- Medals: Gold 0 Silver 0 Bronze 0 Total 0

World Athletics Championships appearances
- 1983; 1987; 1991; 1993; 1995; 1997; 1999; 2001; 2003; 2005; 2007; 2009; 2011; 2013; 2015; 2017; 2019; 2022; 2023; 2025

Saint Kitts and Nevis competed at the 2022 World Athletics Championships in Eugene, Oregon, United States, which were held from 15 to 24 July 2022. The athlete delegation of the country was composed of one competitor, sprinter Amya Clarke. Clarke competed in the women's 100 metres and failed to make it past the qualifying heats.

== Background ==
The 2022 World Athletics Championships in Eugene, Oregon, United States, were held from 15 to 24 July 2022. To qualify for the World Championships, athletes had to reach an entry standard (e.g. time and distance), place in a specific position at select competitions, be a wild card entry, or qualify through their World Athletics Ranking at the end of the qualification period.

As Saint Kitts and Nevis did not meet any of the four standards, they could send either one male or one female athlete in one event of the Championships who has not yet qualified. The St. Kitts Nevis Athletics selected sprinter Amya Clarke who held a personal and season's best of 11.41 seconds in the women's 100 metres, her entered event. This was her first participation for Saint Kitts and Nevis at the World Championships. The official delegation of the nation consisted of Clarke and her coach Lonzo Wilkin, while president of St. Kitts Nevis Athletics Delwayne Delaney attended the Championships as a guest of World Athletics.

== Results ==
Key

- Q = Qualified for the next round
- q = Qualified for the next round as a fastest loser or, in field events, by position without achieving the qualifying target
- NR = National record
- PB = Personal best
- SB = Season best
- N/A = Round not applicable for the event

=== Women ===
Clarke competed in the qualifying heats of the women's 100 metres on 16 July 2022 in the second heat against six other competitors. There, she recorded a time of 11.98 seconds and placed last, failing to advance further as only the top three of each heat and the next three fastest athletes would only be able to do so.

Track and road events

Athlete	Event	Heat		Semi-final		Final	
Athlete	Event	Result	Rank	Result	Rank	Result	Rank
Amya Clarke	100 m	11.98	44	Did not advance			
