= Kyrgyzstan at the 2017 World Championships in Athletics =

- WA code: KGZ

in London
- Competitors: 3
- Medals: Gold 0 Silver 0 Bronze 0 Total 0

World Championships in Athletics appearances
- 1993; 1995; 1997; 1999; 2001; 2003; 2005; 2007; 2009; 2011; 2013; 2015; 2017; 2019; 2022; 2023; 2025

Kyrgyzstan competed at the 2017 World Championships in Athletics in London, Great Britain, from 4–13 August 2017.

== Results ==
(q – qualified, NM – no mark, SB – season best)

=== Women ===
Track and road events

Athlete	Event	Final	
Athlete	Event	Result	Rank
Daria Maslova	10,000 metres	31:57.23 SB	17
Iuliia Andreeva	Marathon	2:53:17 SB	66
Viktoriia Poliudina	Marathon	2:40:28 PB	42
