= Saint Kitts and Nevis at the 2023 World Athletics Championships =

- Flag of Saint Kitts and Nevis
- WA code: SKN

in Budapest, Hungary 19 August 2023 – 27 August 2023
- Competitors: 1 (1 man and 0 women)
- Medals: Gold 0 Silver 0 Bronze 0 Total 0

World Athletics Championships appearances
- 1983; 1987; 1991; 1993; 1995; 1997; 1999; 2001; 2003; 2005; 2007; 2009; 2011; 2013; 2015; 2017; 2019; 2022; 2023; 2025

Saint Kitts and Nevis competed at the 2023 World Athletics Championships in Budapest, Hungary, which were held from 19 to 27 August 2023. The athlete delegation of the country was composed of one competitor, sprinter Nadale Buntin who would compete in the men's 200 metres. He qualified for the Championships upon being selected by St. Kitts Nevis Athletics. In the heats, Brown placed equal fifth alongside another athlete though failed to advance to the semifinals.

== Background ==
The 2023 World Athletics Championships in Budapest, Hungary, were held from 19 to 27 August 2023. The Championships were held at the National Athletics Centre. To qualify for the World Championships, athletes had to reach an entry standard (e.g. time or distance), place in a specific position at select competitions, be a wild card entry, or qualify through their World Athletics Ranking at the end of the qualification period.

As Saint Kitts and Nevis did not meet any of the four standards, they could send either one male or one female athlete in one event of the Championships who has not yet qualified. The Cayman Islands Athletic Association selected sprinter Nadale Buntin who held a personal best of 20.49 seconds and was ranked 98th in the world at the time of his selection for the Championships. This was Buntin's first appearance for Saint Kitts and Nevis at the World Athletics Championships.

== Results ==
Key

- Q = Qualified for the next round
- q = Qualified for the next round as a fastest loser or, in field events, by position without achieving the qualifying target
- NR = National record
- PB = Personal best
- SB = Season best
- N/A = Round not applicable for the event

=== Men ===
Buntin competed in the heats of the men's 200 metres on 23 August. He raced in the fourth heat against seven other competitors. There, he recorded a time of exactly 20.894 seconds, which was rounded off to 20.90 seconds, to place equal fifth alongside Zoltán Wahl of Hungary. Though, Buntin did not place high enough in the round and failed to advance to the semifinals.

Track and road events

Athlete	Event	Heat		Semifinal		Final	
Athlete	Event	Result	Rank	Result	Rank	Result	Rank
Nadale Buntin	200 metres	20.90	=5	Did not advance			
