= Saint Kitts and Nevis at the 2011 World Championships in Athletics =

- WA code: SKN
- National federation: Saint Kitts & Nevis Amateur Athletic Association

in Daegu
- Competitors: 4
- Medals: Gold 0 Silver 0 Bronze 2 Total 2

World Championships in Athletics appearances
- 1983; 1987; 1991; 1993; 1995; 1997; 1999; 2001; 2003; 2005; 2007; 2009; 2011; 2013; 2015; 2017; 2019; 2022; 2023

Saint Kitts and Nevis competed at the 2011 World Championships in Athletics from August 27 to September 4 in Daegu, South Korea.

== Team selection ==
A team of 5 athletes was announced to represent the country in the event. The team is led by former 100m sprint world champion Kim Collins.

The following athletes appeared on the preliminary Entry List, but not on the Official Start List of the specific event, resulting in a total number of 4 competitors:

KEY:	Did not participate	Competed in another event

	Event	Athlete
Men	4 x 100 metres relay	Delwayne Delaney

== Medalists ==
The following competitors from Saint Kitts and Nevis won medals at the Championships

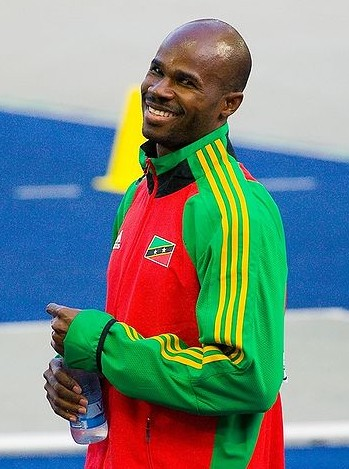
Kim Collins the 35-year-old World champion of 2003, being the oldest ever World 100m finalist, won a bronze medal in this event, and led his teammates in their first final ever to a further bronze medal in the 4 × 100 m relay (foto archived from 2009)

Medal	Athlete	Event
Bronze	Kim Collins	100 metres
Bronze	Jason Rogers; Kim Collins; Antoine Adams; Brijesh Lawrence	4 x 100 metres relay

All participating athletes won at least one medal.

== Results ==
=== Men ===
Athlete	Event	Preliminaries		Heats		Semifinals		Final	
Athlete	Event	Time Width Height	Rank	Time Width Height	Rank	Time Width Height	Rank	Time Width Height	Rank
Kim Collins	100 metres			10.13	3 Q	10.08	4 Q	10.09	3rd place, bronze medalist(s)
Kim Collins	200 metres			20.52 SB	7	20.64	11	Did not advance	
Brijesh Lawrence	200 metres			21.16	43	Did not advance			
Jason Rogers; Kim Collins; Antoine Adams; Brijesh Lawrence	4 x 100 metres relay			38.47 NR	8			38.49	3rd place, bronze medalist(s)
