= Nigeria at the 2009 World Championships in Athletics =

- WA code: NGR

in Berlin
- Competitors: 25
- Medals: Gold 0 Silver 0 Bronze 0 Total 0

World Championships in Athletics appearances
- 1983; 1987; 1991; 1993; 1995; 1997; 1999; 2001; 2003; 2005; 2007; 2009; 2011; 2013; 2015; 2017; 2019; 2022; 2023; 2025

Nigeria competed at the 2009 World Championships in Athletics from 15 to 23 August 2009. A team of 25 athletes was announced in preparation for the competition. The selected athletes had achieved one of the competition's qualifying standards.

The team won no medals; its best result was the 6th-place finish by the women's 4x400 meter relay team.

== Team selection ==
Track and road events

Event	Athletes	
Event	Men	Women
100 metres (Men's, Women's)	Peter Emelieze; Olusoji A. Fasuba; Obinna Metu; Egwero Ogho-Oghene	Blessing Okagbare; Halimat Ismaila
200 metres (Men's, Women's)	Obinna Metu	Gloria Kemasuode; Oludamola Osayomi
400 metres (Men's, Women's)	James Godday; Saul Weigopwa	Folasade Abugan; Amaka Ogoegbunam
100 metres hurdles (Women's)	—	Seun Adigun; Toyin Augustus; Jessica Ohanaja
110 metres hurdles (Men's)	Selim Nurudeen	—
400 metres hurdles (Women's)		Amaka Ogoegbunam; Muizat Ajoke Odumosu
4 x 100 metres relay (Women's)		Christy Opara-Thompson; Beatrice Utondu; Faith Idehen; Mary Onyali-Omagbemi
4 x 400 metres relay (Men's, Women's)	Saul Weigopwa; Noah Akwu; Amaechi Morton; Bola Gee Lawal	Falilat Ogunkoya; Fatima Yusuf; Olabisi Afolabi; Charity Opara

Field and combined events

Event	Athletes	
Event	Men	Women
High jump (Women's)		Doreen Amata
Long jump (Men's, Women's)	Stanley Gbabeke	Blessing Okagbare
Triple jump (Men's)	Tosin Oke	
Shot put (Women's)		Vivian Chukwuemeka
