= Papua New Guinea at the 2017 World Championships in Athletics =

- Flag of Papua New Guinea
- WA code: PNG
- National federation: Athletics Papua New Guinea
- Website: Official website

in London, United Kingdom 4–13 August 2017
- Competitors: 3 in 4 events
- Medals: Gold 0 Silver 0 Bronze 0 Total 0

World Championships in Athletics appearances
- 1983; 1987; 1991; 1993; 1995; 1997; 1999; 2001; 2003; 2005; 2007; 2009; 2011; 2013; 2015; 2017; 2019; 2022; 2023; 2025

Papua New Guinea competed at the 2017 World Championships in Athletics in London, Great Britain, from 4–13 August 2017.

== Results ==
=== Men ===
Track and road events

Athlete	Event	Heat		Semifinal		Final	
Athlete	Event	Result	Rank	Result	Rank	Result	Rank
Ephraim Lerkin	400 metres hurdles	52.36	35	Did not advance			

=== Women ===
Track and road events

Athlete	Event	Heat		Semifinal		Final	
Athlete	Event	Result	Rank	Result	Rank	Result	Rank
Toea Wisil	100 metres	11.41	27	Did not advance			
Toea Wisil	200 metres	23.93	42	Did not advance			

Field events

Athlete	Event	Qualification		Final	
Athlete	Event	Distance	Position	Distance	Position
Rellie Kaputin	Long jump	5.59 m	30	Did not advance	
