= Switzerland at the 2025 World Athletics Championships =

- Flag of Switzerland
- WA code: SUI

in Tokyo, Japan 13−21 September 2025
- Competitors: 31 (9 men and 22 women)
- Medals Ranked 19th: Gold 1 Silver 0 Bronze 0 Total 1

World Athletics Championships appearances
- 1976; 1980; 1983; 1987; 1991; 1993; 1995; 1997; 1999; 2001; 2003; 2005; 2007; 2009; 2011; 2013; 2015; 2017; 2019; 2022; 2023; 2025

Switzerland competed at the 2025 World Athletics Championships in Tokyo, Japan, from 13 to 21 September 2025.

== Medallists ==
Medal	Athlete	Event	Date
Gold	Ditaji Kambundji	Women's 100 metres hurdles	September 15

== Results ==
Switzerland entered 31 athletes to the championships.

Key

- Q = Qualified for the next round
- q = Qualified for the next round as a fastest loser or, in field events, by position without achieving the qualifying target
- NR = National record
- PB = Personal best
- SB = Season best
- N/A = Round not applicable for the event

=== Men ===
Track and road events

Athlete	Event	Heat		Semifinal		Final	
Athlete	Event	Result	Rank	Result	Rank	Result	Rank
Timothé Mumenthaler	200 metres	20.39	3 Q	20.66	7	Did not advance	
William Reais	200 metres	20.38 SB	4 q	20.59	7	Did not advance	
Lionel Spitz	400 metres	45.57	7	Did not advance			
Ivan Pelizza	800 metres	1:45.65	5	Did not advance			
Dominic Lobalu	5000 metres	13:19.57	11	—N/a		Did not advance	
Dominic Lobalu	10,000 metres	—N/a				29:11.65 SB	14
Jason Joseph	110 metres hurdles	13.27	1 Q	13.18	2 Q	DNF	
Julien Bonvin	400 metres hurdles	49.53	9	Did not advance			

Field events

Athlete	Event	Qualification		Final	
Athlete	Event	Distance	Position	Distance	Position
Simon Ehammer	Long jump	7.99	11 q	8.30	4
Simon Wieland	Javelin throw	82.26 NR	14	Did not advance	

Combined events – Decathlon

Athlete	Event	100 m	LJ	SP	HJ	400 m	110H	DT	PV	JT	1500 m	Final	Rank
Simon Ehammer	Result	10.66	7.97	14.28	NM	DNS	—N/a						DNF
Simon Ehammer	Points	938	1053	745	0	DNS	—N/a						DNF

=== Women ===
Track and road events

Athlete	Event	Heat		Semifinal		Final	
Athlete	Event	Result	Rank	Result	Rank	Result	Rank
Géraldine Frey	100 metres	11.25	3 Q	11.34	7	Did not advance	
Salomé Kora	100 metres	11.23	2 Q	11.30	7	Did not advance	
Léonie Pointet	200 metres	23.04	4	Did not advance			
Lore Hoffmann	800 metres	1:59.76	6	Did not advance			
Veronica Vancardo	800 metres	2:01.13	4	Did not advance			
Audrey Werro	800 metres	1:58.43	1 Q	1:56.99	2 Q	1:56.17	6
Lilly Nägeli	1500 metres	4:12.30	12	Did not advance			
Joceline Wind	1500 metres	4:04.29	8	Did not advance			
Ditaji Kambundji	100 metres hurdles	12.59	2 Q	12.44	2 Q	12.24 NR	1st place, gold medalist(s)
Céline Bürgi; Ajla Del Ponte; Géraldine Frey; Léonie Pointet	4 × 100 metres relay	Did not finish		—N/a		Did not advance	
Iris Caligiuri; Annina Fahr; Catia Gubelmann; Lena Wernli	4 × 400 metres relay	3:27.46 SB	6	—N/a		Did not advance	

Field events

Athlete	Event	Qualification		Final	
Athlete	Event	Distance	Position	Distance	Position
Lea Bachmann	Pole vault	4.45	16	Did not advance	
Angelica Moser	Pole vault	4.60	1 q	4.65	5
Pascale Stöcklin	Pole vault	4.45	21	Did not advance	
Annik Kälin	Long jump	6.36	25	Did not advance	
Miryam Mazenauer	Shot put	16.41	33	Did not advance	

Combined events – Heptathlon

Athlete	Event	100H	HJ	SP	200 m	LJ	JT	800 m	Final	Rank
Annik Kälin	Result	DNS								
