= Nigeria at the 2025 World Athletics Championships =

- Flag of Nigeria
- WA code: NGR

in Tokyo, Japan 13 September 2025 – 21 September 2025
- Competitors: 15 (8 men and 7 women)
- Medals Ranked 27th: Gold 0 Silver 1 Bronze 0 Total 1

World Athletics Championships appearances
- 1983; 1987; 1991; 1993; 1995; 1997; 1999; 2001; 2003; 2005; 2007; 2009; 2011; 2013; 2015; 2017; 2019; 2022; 2023; 2025

Nigeria competed at the 2025 World Athletics Championships in Tokyo, Japan, from 13 to 21 September 2025.

== Medallists ==
Medal	Athlete	Event	Date
Silver	Tobi Amusan	Women's 100 metres hurdles	September 15

== Results ==
Nigeria entered 15 athletes to the championships.

Key

- Q = Qualified for the next round
- q = Qualified for the next round as a fastest loser or, in field events, by position without achieving the qualifying target
- NR = National record
- PB = Personal best
- SB = Season best
- N/A = Round not applicable for the event

=== Men ===
Track and road events

Athlete	Event	Heat		Semifinal		Final	
Athlete	Event	Result	Rank	Result	Rank	Result	Rank
Kayinsola Ajayi	100 metres	9.88	2 Q	9.93	2	10.00	6
Israel Okon Sunday	100 metres	10.04	1 Q	10.14	7	Did not advance	
Udodi Onwuzurike	200 metres	20.27	2 Q	20.26	7	Did not advance	
Samuel Ogazi	400 metres	45.97	5	Did not advance			
Chidi Okezie	400 metres	45.66	8	Did not advance			
Ezekiel Nathaniel	400 metres hurdles	48.37	1 Q	47.47	1 Q	47.11 NR	4

Field events

Athlete	Event	Qualification		Final	
Athlete	Event	Distance	Position	Distance	Position
Charles Godfred	Long jump	7.79	24	Did not advance	
Chukwuebuka Enekwechi	Shot put	20.83	7 q	21.52	5

=== Women ===
Track and road events

Athlete	Event	Heat		Semifinal		Final	
Athlete	Event	Result	Rank	Result	Rank	Result	Rank
Rosemary Chukwuma	100 metres	11.27	5	Did not advance			
Tobi Amusan	100 metres hurdles	12.53	1 Q	12.36	1 Q	12.29	2nd place, silver medalist(s)

Field events

Athlete	Event	Qualification		Final	
Athlete	Event	Distance	Position	Distance	Position
Ese Brume	Long jump	6.46	19	Did not advance	
Prestina Ochonogor	Long jump	6.05	33	Did not advance	
Obiageri Amaechi	Discus throw	55.69	33	Did not advance	
Chioma Onyekwere-Lyons	Discus throw	59.45	20	Did not advance	
Oyesade Olatoye	Hammer throw	68.82	21	Did not advance	
