= Hungary at the 2025 World Athletics Championships =

- Flag of Hungary
- WA code: HUN

in Tokyo, Japan 13 September 2025 – 21 September 2025
- Competitors: 17 (7 men and 10 women)
- Medals Ranked 41st: Gold 0 Silver 0 Bronze 1 Total 1

World Athletics Championships appearances (overview)
- 1976; 1980; 1983; 1987; 1991; 1993; 1995; 1997; 1999; 2001; 2003; 2005; 2007; 2009; 2011; 2013; 2015; 2017; 2019; 2022; 2023; 2025

Hungary competed at the 2025 World Athletics Championships in Tokyo, Japan, from 13 to 21 September 2025.

== Medallists ==
Medal	Athlete	Event	Date
Bronze	Bence Halász	Men's hammer throw	September 16

== Results ==
Hungary entered 17 athletes to the championships: 10 women and 7 men.

Key

- Q = Qualified for the next round
- q = Qualified for the next round as a fastest loser or, in field events, by position without achieving the qualifying target
- NR = National record
- PB = Personal best
- SB = Season best
- N/A = Round not applicable for the event

=== Men ===
Track and road events

Athlete	Event	Heat		Semifinal		Final	
Athlete	Event	Result	Rank	Result	Rank	Result	Rank
Patrik Simon Enyingi	400 metres	45.25	5	Did not advance			
Attila Molnár	400 metres	44.55 NR	3 Q	44.94	5	Did not advance	
Bence Venyercsán	20 kilometres walk	—N/a				1:23:06	32
Bence Venyercsán	35 kilometres walk	—N/a				2:39:14	22

Field events

Athlete	Event	Qualification		Final	
Athlete	Event	Distance	Position	Distance	Position
Márton Böndör	Pole vault	5.40 m	26	Did not advance	
Bence Halász	Hammer throw	78.42	4 Q	82.69	3rd place, bronze medalist(s)
Dániel Rába	Hammer throw	76.21 SB	11 q	75.22	11
Ármin Szabados	Hammer throw	77.20	9 Q	77.15	8

=== Women ===
Track and road events

Athlete	Event	Heat		Semifinal		Final	
Athlete	Event	Result	Rank	Result	Rank	Result	Rank
Boglárka Takács	100 metres	11.12	4 q	11.32	8	Did not advance	
Boglárka Takács	200 metres	23.18	5	Did not advance			
Nóra Szabó	Marathon	—N/a				2:31:41	15
Luca Kozák	100 metres hurdles	12.96	4 q	13.01	5	Did not advance	
Anna Tóth	100 metres hurdles	13.06	6	Did not advance			
Sára Mátó	400 metres hurdles	56.11	7	Did not advance			
Tiziana Spiller	20 kilometres walk	—N/a				1:35:32	36
Viktória Madarász	35 kilometres walk	—N/a				DNF	

Field events

Athlete	Event	Qualification		Final	
Athlete	Event	Distance	Position	Distance	Position
Lilianna Bátori	High jump	1.88	20	Did not advance	
Hanga Klekner	Pole vault	4.25	25	Did not advance	
Zsanett Németh	Hammer throw	66.97	27	Did not advance	
