= 2025 World Athletics Championships =

Athletics competition in Tokyo, Japan

World Athletics Championships Tokyo 2025
- Host city: Tokyo
- Country: Japan
- Motto: Every Second, Sugoi
- Organizers: World Athletics, JAAF
- Edition: 20th
- Nations: 198
- Athletes: 2202
- Sport: Athletics
- Events: 49
- Dates: 13–21 September 2025
- Opened by: Fumihito, Crown Prince of Japan
- Closed by: World Athletics President Sebastian Coe
- Main venue: National Stadium
- Website: Tokyo25

The 2025 World Athletics Championships (Japanese: 2025年世界陸上競技選手権大会) were the twentieth edition of the World Athletics Championships, and were held from 13 to 21 September 2025 in Tokyo, Japan.

The championships used the National Stadium, rebuilt for the Tokyo 2020 Olympic and Paralympic Games. Full capacity attendances were permitted at a major sporting event in Japan for the first time since the COVID-19 pandemic in the early 2020s (the most recent with full capacity had been the 2019 Rugby World Cup).

This was the third time that the championships were held in Japan, following the 1991 event in Tokyo at the former National Stadium, and the 2007 event in Osaka.

K, member of the Japanese boy band &TEAM, was selected as the official supporter for 2025 World Athletics Championships.

A total of 53 nations won medals at the championships, more than in any previous edition. Samoa, Saint Lucia and Uruguay won their first ever medals at the championships, while Tanzania won their first ever gold medal. The United States has won the most medals in the latest edition of World Athletics Championships, with over 450 total medals.

== Host selection and venue ==
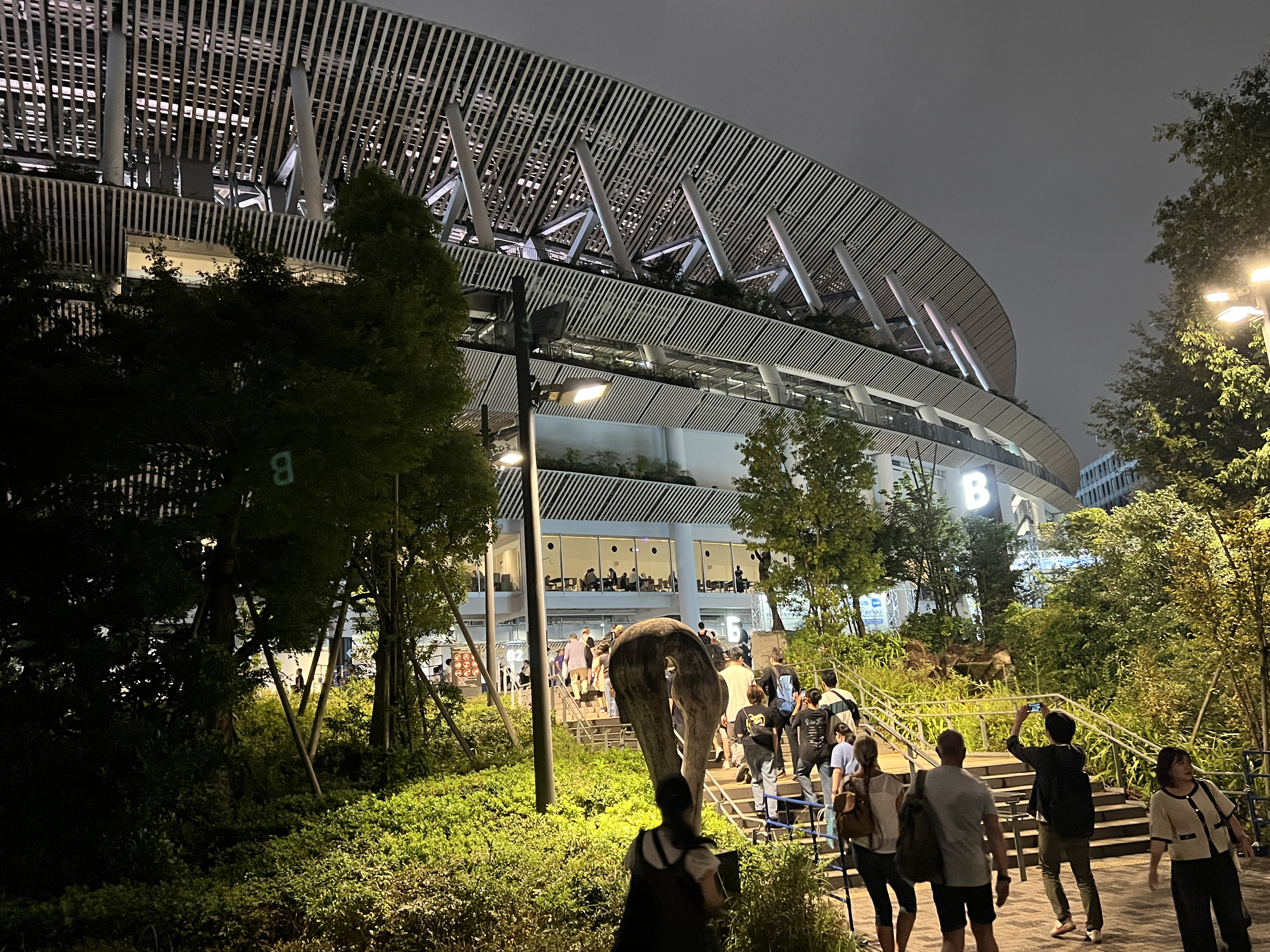
Japan National Stadium on Sept. 20, 2025, the eighth night of the 2025 World Athletics Championships

- Nairobi, Kenya (Kasarani Stadium)
- Singapore (National Stadium)
- Tokyo, Japan (National Stadium)
- Chorzów, Poland (Silesian Stadium)

In October 2019, World Athletics president Sebastian Coe stated consideration of a direct choice for Kenya to host this championship.

Kenya confirmed its bid for the championships in October 2021.

In 2022, Japan and Singapore entered bids to host the championships. In July 2022, Tokyo was selected by World Athletics to host the 2025 event, after it scored the highest in the bid evaluation. The National Stadium in Tokyo became the first major spectator event for athletics after the 2020 Summer Olympics were held behind closed doors in response with the then-still ongoing COVID-19 pandemic. Coe welcomed the selection, but stated that his "ambition to see a World Championships in Africa... is undiminished".

== Qualification ==
World Athletics approved the timetable and qualification system for the 2025 World Athletics Championships on 31 July 2024.

=== Window ===
The qualifying window for the marathon and 35 km race walk was 5 November 2023 until 4 May 2025. For the 10,000 m, 20 km race walk, combined events and relays, the window ran from 25 February 2024 to 24 August 2025. For all other events, entry standards could be achieved from 1 August 2024 to 24 August 2025.

=== Entry standards ===
The qualification system for the championships was based on a combination of entry standards and world rankings. The entry standards were set with the aim of qualifying about 50% of the athletes.

The top five finishers at Platinum Label marathons and winners of individual events at area championships (except for the marathon), regardless of marks, were considered as having achieved the entry standard.

The top three athletes in the 2024–25 World Athletics Cross Country Tour – not qualified through entry standards or other ways – were deemed to be qualified for the 10,000 m.

The 2025 World Athletics Relays in Guangzhou, China were used as a qualifying event for the relays, with the top 14 teams in each event securing their place at the World Championships.

Event	Men	Quota	Women	Quota
100 metres	10.00	48	11.07	48
200 metres	20.16	48	22.57	48
400 metres	44.85	48	50.75	48
800 metres	1:44.50	56	1:59.00	56
1500 metres / Mile	3:33.00 / 3:50.00	56	4:01.50 / 4:19.90	56
5000 metres	13:01.00	42	14:50.00	42
10,000 metres / 10 km road	27:00.00	27	30:20.00	27
Marathon	2:06:30	100	2:23:30	100
3000 metres steeplechase	8:15.00	36	9:18.00	36
110/100 metres hurdles	13.27	40	12.73	40
400 metres hurdles	48.50	40	54.65	40
High jump	2.33	36	1.97	36
Pole vault	5.82	36	4.73	36
Long jump	8.27	36	6.86	36
Triple jump	17.22	36	14.55	36
Shot put	21.50	36	18.80	36
Discus throw	67.50	36	64.50	36
Hammer throw	78.20	36	74.00	36
Javelin throw	85.50	36	64.00	36
Decathlon / Heptathlon	8550	24	6500	24
20 kilometres race walk	1:19:20	50	1:29:00	50
35 kilometres race walk	2:28:00	50	2:48:00	50
4 × 100 metres relay	Top 14 at the 2025 World Athletics Relays + 2 from Top Lists	16	Top 14 at the 2025 World Athletics Relays + 2 from Top Lists	16
4 × 400 metres relay	Top 14 at the 2025 World Athletics Relays + 2 from Top Lists	16	Top 14 at the 2025 World Athletics Relays + 2 from Top Lists	16
4 × 400 metres relay mixed	Top 14 at the 2025 World Athletics Relays + 2 from Top Lists	16	Top 14 at the 2025 World Athletics Relays + 2 from Top Lists	16

== Event schedule ==
In August 2024, World Athletics released the timetable for the championships.

Legend
Key	P	Q	H	½	F
Value	Preliminary round	Qualifiers	Heats	Semifinals	Final

M = morning session, E = evening session

Men
Date	Sep 13		Sep 14			Sep 15		Sep 16		Sep 17	Sep 18	Sep 19	Sep 20		Sep 21	
Event	M	E	M	E		M	E	E		E	E	E	M	E	M	E
100 m	P	H		½	F											
200 m										H	½	F				
400 m				H				½			F					
800 m								H			½			F		
1500 m			H				½			F						
5000 m												H				F
10,000 m				F												
Marathon						F										
3000 m steeplechase		H					F									
110 m hurdles							H	½	F							
400 m hurdles							H			½		F				
Decathlon													F			
High jump				Q				F								
Pole vault		Q					F									
Long jump							Q			F						
Triple jump										Q		F				
Shot put	Q	F														
Discus throw													Q			F
Hammer throw						Q		F								
Javelin throw										Q	F					
20 km walk													F			
35 km walk	F															
4 × 100 m relay														H		F
4 × 400 m relay														H		F

Women
Date	Sep 13		Sep 14			Sep 15			Sep 16	Sep 17	Sep 18	Sep 19	Sep 20		Sep 21	
Event	M	E	M	E		M	E		E	E	E	E	M	E	M	E
100 m		H		½	F											
200 m										H	½	F				
400 m				H					½		F					
800 m											H	½				F
1500 m		H		½					F							
5000 m											H			F		
10,000 m		F														
Marathon			F													
3000 m steeplechase						H				F						
100 m hurdles			H				½	F								
400 m hurdles						H				½		F				
Heptathlon												F				
High jump											Q					F
Pole vault						Q				F						
Long jump		Q		F												
Triple jump									Q		F					
Shot put													Q	F		
Discus throw	Q			F												
Hammer throw			Q				F									
Javelin throw												Q		F		
20 km walk													F			
35 km walk	F															
4 × 100 m relay														H		F
4 × 400 m relay														H		F

Mixed
Date	Sep 13	
Event	M	E
4 × 400 m relay	H	F

== Medal table ==
* Host nation (Japan)

Rank	Nation	Gold	Silver	Bronze	Total
1	United States	16	5	5	26
2	Kenya	7	2	2	11
3	Canada	3	1	1	5
4	Netherlands	2	2	2	6
5	Botswana	2	0	1	3
5	New Zealand	2	0	1	3
5	Spain	2	0	1	3
5	Sweden	2	0	1	3
9	Portugal	2	0	0	2
10	Jamaica	1	6	3	10
11	Italy	1	3	3	7
12	Germany	1	3	1	5
13	Brazil	1	2	0	3
14	Trinidad and Tobago	1	1	0	2
15	Australia	1	0	3	4
16	Cuba	1	0	2	3
17	Ecuador	1	0	1	2
17	France	1	0	1	2
19	Switzerland	1	0	0	1
19	Tanzania	1	0	0	1
21	Great Britain & N.I.	0	3	2	5
22	China	0	2	2	4
22	Ethiopia	0	2	2	4
24	Mexico	0	2	0	2
25	Bahrain	0	1	1	2
25	Belgium	0	1	1	2
27	Algeria	0	1	0	1
27	Dominica	0	1	0	1
27	Dominican Republic	0	1	0	1
27	Greece	0	1	0	1
27	Grenada	0	1	0	1
27	Ireland	0	1	0	1
27	Latvia	0	1	0	1
27	Lithuania	0	1	0	1
27	Morocco	0	1	0	1
27	Nigeria	0	1	0	1
27	Poland	0	1	0	1
27	Puerto Rico	0	1	0	1
27	South Korea	0	1	0	1
40	Japan*	0	0	2	2
41	Colombia	0	0	1	1
41	Czech Republic	0	0	1	1
41	Hungary	0	0	1	1
41	Qatar	0	0	1	1
41	Saint Lucia	0	0	1	1
41	Samoa	0	0	1	1
41	Serbia	0	0	1	1
41	Slovakia	0	0	1	1
41	Slovenia	0	0	1	1
41	South Africa	0	0	1	1
41	Ukraine	0	0	1	1
41	Uruguay	0	0	1	1
41	Venezuela	0	0	1	1
Totals (53 entries)		49	49	51	149

== Medal summary ==
=== Men ===
Event	Gold		Silver		Bronze	
100 metres	Oblique Seville; Jamaica	9.77 PB	Kishane Thompson; Jamaica	9.82	Noah Lyles; United States	9.89 SB
200 metres	Noah Lyles; United States	19.52	Kenny Bednarek; United States	19.58 SB	Bryan Levell; Jamaica	19.64 PB
400 metres	Collen Kebinatshipi; Botswana	43.53 NR, WL	Jereem Richards; Trinidad and Tobago	43.72 NR	Bayapo Ndori; Botswana	44.20 SB
800 metres	Emmanuel Wanyonyi; Kenya	1:41.86 CR	Djamel Sedjati; Algeria	1:41.90 SB	Marco Arop; Canada	1:41.95 SB
1500 metres	Isaac Nader; Portugal	3:34.10	Jake Wightman; Great Britain and Northern Ireland	3:34.12	Reynold Cheruiyot; Kenya	3:34.25
5000 metres	Cole Hocker; United States	12:58.30	Isaac Kimeli; Belgium	12:58.78 SB	Jimmy Gressier; France	12:59.33
10,000 metres	Jimmy Gressier; France	28:55.77 SB	Yomif Kejelcha; Ethiopia	28:55.83 SB	Andreas Almgren; Sweden	28:56.02
4 × 100 metres relay	United States; Christian Coleman; Kenny Bednarek; Courtney Lindsey; Noah Lyles; Ronnie Baker*; Trayvon Bromell*; T'Mars McCallum*	37.29 WL	Canada; Aaron Brown; Jerome Blake; Brendon Rodney; Andre De Grasse	37.55 SB	Netherlands; Nsikak Ekpo; Taymir Burnet; Xavi Mo-Ajok; Elvis Afrifa	37.81 NR
4 × 400 metres relay	Botswana; Lee Eppie; Letsile Tebogo; Bayapo Ndori; Collen Kebinatshipi; Leungo Scotch*	2:57.76	United States; Vernon Norwood; Jacory Patterson; Khaleb McRae; Rai Benjamin; Demarius Smith*; Christopher Bailey*; Jenoah McKiver*; Bryce Deadmon*	2:57.83 SB	South Africa; Lythe Pillay; Udeme Okon; Wayde van Niekerk; Zakhiti Nene; Gardeo Isaacs*; Leendert Koekemoer*	2:57.83
110 metres hurdles	Cordell Tinch; United States	12.99	Orlando Bennett; Jamaica	13.08 PB	Tyler Mason; Jamaica	13.12 =PB
400 metres hurdles	Rai Benjamin; United States	46.52 SB	Alison dos Santos; Brazil	46.84	Abderrahman Samba; Qatar	47.06 SB
3000 metres steeplechase	Geordie Beamish; New Zealand	8:33.88	Soufiane El Bakkali; Morocco	8:33.95	Edmund Serem; Kenya	8:34.56
Marathon	Alphonce Simbu; Tanzania	2:09:48 SB	Amanal Petros; Germany	2:09:48	Iliass Aouani; Italy	2:09:53
20 kilometres walk	Caio Bonfim; Brazil	1:18:35	Wang Zhaozhao; China	1:18:43	Paul McGrath; Spain	1:18:45
35 kilometres walk	Evan Dunfee; Canada	2:28:22	Caio Bonfim; Brazil	2:28:55 SB	Hayato Katsuki; Japan	2:29:16
High jump	Hamish Kerr; New Zealand	2.36 m =AR, WL	Woo Sang-hyeok; South Korea	2.34 m =SB	Jan Štefela; Czech Republic	2.31 m
Pole vault	Armand Duplantis; Sweden	6.30 m WR	Emmanouil Karalis; Greece	6.00 m	Kurtis Marschall; Australia	5.95 m PB
Long jump	Mattia Furlani; Italy	8.39 m PB	Tajay Gayle; Jamaica	8.34 m =SB	Shi Yuhao; China	8.33 m SB
Triple jump	Pedro Pichardo; Portugal	17.91 m WL	Andrea Dallavalle; Italy	17.64 m PB	Lázaro Martínez; Cuba	17.49 m SB
Shot put	Ryan Crouser; United States	22.34 m SB	Uziel Muñoz; Mexico	21.97 m NR	Leonardo Fabbri; Italy	21.94 m
Discus throw	Daniel Ståhl; Sweden	70.47 m SB	Mykolas Alekna; Lithuania	67.84 m	Alex Rose; Samoa	66.96 m
Javelin throw	Keshorn Walcott; Trinidad and Tobago	88.16 m SB	Anderson Peters; Grenada	87.38 m	Curtis Thompson; United States	86.67 m
Hammer throw	Ethan Katzberg; Canada	84.70 m CR, AR	Merlin Hummel; Germany	82.77 m PB	Bence Halász; Hungary	82.69 m
Decathlon	Leo Neugebauer; Germany	8804 SB	Ayden Owens-Delerme; Puerto Rico	8784 NR	Kyle Garland; United States	8703
WR world record | AR area record | CR championship record | GR games record | NR national record | OR Olympic record | PB personal best | SB season best | WL world leading (in a given season)

* Indicates the athletes only competed in the preliminary heats and received medals

=== Women ===
Event	Gold		Silver		Bronze	
100 metres	Melissa Jefferson-Wooden; United States	10.61 CR	Tina Clayton; Jamaica	10.76 PB	Julien Alfred; Saint Lucia	10.84
200 metres	Melissa Jefferson-Wooden; United States	21.68 WL	Amy Hunt; Great Britain and Northern Ireland	22.14	Shericka Jackson; Jamaica	22.18
400 metres	Sydney McLaughlin-Levrone; United States	47.78 CR, AR, WL	Marileidy Paulino; Dominican Republic	47.98 NR	Salwa Eid Naser; Bahrain	48.19 SB
800 metres	Lilian Odira; Kenya	1:54.62 CR, PB	Georgia Hunter Bell; Great Britain and Northern Ireland	1:54.90 PB	Keely Hodgkinson; Great Britain and Northern Ireland	1:54.91
1500 metres	Faith Kipyegon; Kenya	3:52.15	Dorcus Ewoi; Kenya	3:54.92 PB	Jessica Hull; Australia	3:55.16
5000 metres	Beatrice Chebet; Kenya	14:54.36	Faith Kipyegon; Kenya	14:55.07 SB	Nadia Battocletti; Italy	14:55.42
10,000 metres	Beatrice Chebet; Kenya	30:37.61	Nadia Battocletti; Italy	30:38.23 NR	Gudaf Tsegay; Ethiopia	30:39.65 SB
4 × 100 metres relay	United States; Melissa Jefferson-Wooden; Twanisha Terry; Kayla White; Sha'Carri Richardson; Jacious Sears*	41.75	Jamaica; Shelly-Ann Fraser-Pryce; Tia Clayton; Tina Clayton; Jonielle Smith; Jodean Williams*	41.79 SB	Germany; Sina Mayer; Rebekka Haase; Sophia Junk; Gina Lückenkemper	41.87
4 × 400 metres relay	United States; Isabella Whittaker; Lynna Irby-Jackson; Aaliyah Butler; Sydney McLaughlin-Levrone; Alexis Holmes*; Rosey Effiong*; Quanera Hayes*; Britton Wilson*	3:16.61 CR	Jamaica; Dejanea Oakley; Stacey Ann Williams; Andrenette Knight; Nickisha Pryce; Roneisha McGregor*	3:19.25 SB	Netherlands; Eveline Saalberg; Lieke Klaver; Lisanne De Witte; Femke Bol; Myrte van der Schoot*	3:20.18 SB
100 metres hurdles	Ditaji Kambundji; Switzerland	12.24 NR	Tobi Amusan; Nigeria	12.29	Grace Stark; United States	12.34
400 metres hurdles	Femke Bol; Netherlands	51.54 WL	Jasmine Jones; United States	52.08 PB	Emma Zapletalová; Slovakia	53.00 NR
3000 metres steeplechase	Faith Cherotich; Kenya	8:51.59 CR	Winfred Yavi; Bahrain	8:56.46	Sembo Almayew; Ethiopia	8:58.86 PB
Marathon	Peres Jepchirchir; Kenya	2:24:43 SB	Tigst Assefa; Ethiopia	2:24:45	Julia Paternain; Uruguay	2:27:23
20 kilometres walk	María Pérez; Spain	1:25:54 SB	Alegna González; Mexico	1:26:06 AR	Nanako Fujii; Japan	1:26:18 NR
35 kilometres walk	María Pérez; Spain	2:39:01	Antonella Palmisano; Italy	2:42:24	Paula Milena Torres; Ecuador	2:42:44 NR
High jump	Nicola Olyslagers; Australia	2.00 m	Maria Żodzik; Poland	2.00 m PB	Yaroslava Mahuchikh; Ukraine Angelina Topić; Serbia	1.97 m 1.97 m SB
Pole vault	Katie Moon; United States	4.90 m SB	Sandi Morris; United States	4.85 m SB	Tina Šutej; Slovenia	4.80 m SB
Long jump	Tara Davis-Woodhall; United States	7.13 m WL	Malaika Mihambo; Germany	6.99 m	Natalia Linares; Colombia	6.92 m =AU23R
Triple jump	Leyanis Pérez; Cuba	14.94 m WL	Thea LaFond; Dominica	14.89 m SB	Yulimar Rojas; Venezuela	14.76 m SB
Shot put	Jessica Schilder; Netherlands	20.29 m	Chase Jackson; United States	20.21 m	Maddi Wesche; New Zealand	20.06 m =PB
Discus throw	Valarie Allman; United States	69.48 m	Jorinde van Klinken; Netherlands	67.50 m SB	Silinda Morales; Cuba	67.25 m PB
Javelin throw	Juleisy Angulo; Ecuador	65.12 m NR	Anete Sietiņa; Latvia	64.64 m PB	Mackenzie Little; Australia	63.58 m
Hammer throw	Camryn Rogers; Canada	80.51 m AR, WL	Zhao Jie; China	77.60 m PB	Zhang Jiale; China	77.10 m
Heptathlon	Anna Hall; United States	6888	Kate O'Connor; Ireland	6714 NR	Katarina Johnson-Thompson; Great Britain and Northern Ireland Taliyah Brooks; United States	6581 SB 6581 PB
WR world record | AR area record | CR championship record | GR games record | NR national record | OR Olympic record | PB personal best | SB season best | WL world leading (in a given season)

* Indicates the athletes only competed in the preliminary heats and received medals

=== Mixed ===
Event	Gold		Silver		Bronze	
4 × 400 metres relay	United States; Bryce Deadmon; Lynna Irby; Jenoah McKiver; Alexis Holmes	3:08.80 =CR	Netherlands; Eugene Omalla; Lieke Klaver; Jonas Phijffers; Femke Bol; Eveline Saalberg*	3:09.96 SB	Belgium; Dylan Borlée; Imke Vervaet; Alexander Doom; Helena Ponette; Jonathan Sacoor*	3:10.61

== Participating nations ==
On 5 September 2025, World Athletics officially published the final entry lists to the championships. 2127 athletes from 196 competed at the championships.

- Athlete Refugee Team (6)
- Albania (1)
- Algeria (9)
- American Samoa (1)
- Andorra (1)
- Angola (1)
- Anguilla (1)
- Antigua and Barbuda (1)
- Argentina (5)
- Armenia (2)
- Australia (86)
- Austria (10)
- Azerbaijan (1)
- Bahamas (15)
- Bahrain (8)
- Bangladesh (1)
- Barbados (3)
- Belgium (47)
- Belize (1)
- Benin (2)
- Bermuda (1)
- Bolivia (1)
- Bosnia and Herzegovina (1)
- Botswana (12)
- Brazil (47)
- British Virgin Islands (6)
- Brunei (1)
- Bulgaria (4)
- Burkina Faso (2)
- Burundi (4)
- Cambodia (1)
- Cameroon (4)
- Canada (59)
- Cape Verde (1)
- Cayman Islands (1)
- Chad (1)
- Chile (14)
- China (73)
- Colombia (18)
- Comoros (1)
- Republic of the Congo (1)
- Cook Islands (1)
- Costa Rica (3)
- Croatia (8)
- Cuba (17)
- Cyprus (5)
- Czech Republic (25)
- Democratic Republic of the Congo (1)
- Denmark (9)
- Djibouti (3)
- Dominica (3)
- Dominican Republic (4)
- Ecuador (14)
- Egypt (4)
- El Salvador (1)
- Equatorial Guinea (1)
- Eritrea (6)
- Estonia (10)
- Ethiopia (36)
- Fiji (1)
- Finland (27)
- France (73)
- French Polynesia (1)
- Gabon (1)
- The Gambia (1)
- Georgia (1)
- Germany (82)
- Ghana (8)
- Gibraltar (1)
- Great Britain and Northern Ireland (64)
- Greece (19)
- Grenada (4)
- Guam (1)
- Guatemala (3)
- Guinea (2)
- Guinea-Bissau (1)
- Guyana (1)
- Haiti (2)
- Honduras (1)
- Hong Kong (1)
- Hungary (17)
- Iceland (3)
- India (19)
- Indonesia (1)
- Iraq (1)
- Iran (1)
- Ireland (29)
- Israel (8)
- Italy (89)
- Ivory Coast (5)
- Jamaica (62)
- Japan (80) (hosts)
- Jordan (1)
- Kazakhstan (5)
- Kenya (56)
- Kiribati (1)
- South Korea (8)
- Kosovo (1)
- Kuwait (1)
- Kyrgyzstan (1)
- Laos (1)
- Latvia (4)
- Lebanon (1)
- Lesotho (1)
- Liberia (3)
- Lithuania (11)
- Luxembourg (4)
- Macau (1)
- Madagascar (1)
- Malaysia (1)
- Maldives (1)
- Mali (1)
- Malta (1)
- Marshall Islands (1)
- Mauritius (1)
- Mexico (19)
- Federated States of Micronesia (1)
- Moldova (2)
- Mongolia (4)
- Montenegro (1)
- Montserrat (1)
- Morocco (19)
- Mozambique (1)
- Myanmar (1)
- Namibia (2)
- Nicaragua (1)
- Nauru (1)
- Nepal (1)
- Netherlands (53)
- New Zealand (14)
- Niger (2)
- Nigeria (15)
- North Macedonia (2)
- Northern Mariana Islands (1)
- Norway (28)
- Oman (1)
- Pakistan (1)
- Palau (1)
- Palestine (1)
- Panama (2)
- Papua New Guinea (1)
- Paraguay (2)
- Philippines (2)
- Peru (10)
- Poland (62)
- Portugal (31)
- Puerto Rico (12)
- Qatar (11)
- Romania (9)
- Rwanda (3)
- Saint Kitts and Nevis (1)
- Saint Lucia (2)
- Saint Vincent and the Grenadines (2)
- Samoa (1)
- San Marino (1)
- São Tomé and Príncipe (1)
- Saudi Arabia (5)
- Senegal (4)
- Serbia (6)
- Seychelles (1)
- Singapore (2)
- Slovakia (9)
- Slovenia (10)
- Solomon Islands (1)
- South Africa (48)
- South Sudan (1)
- Spain (56)
- Sri Lanka (3)
- Sudan (1)
- Suriname (1)
- Sweden (35)
- Syria (1)
- Switzerland (32)
- Chinese Taipei (2)
- Tajikistan (1)
- Tanzania (2)
- Thailand (2)
- Timor-Leste (1)
- Tonga (1)
- Togo (1)
- Trinidad and Tobago (4)
- Tunisia (4)
- Turkey (20)
- Turkmenistan (1)
- Turks and Caicos Islands (1)
- Uganda (21)
- Ukraine (23)
- United States (143)
- Uruguay (9)
- Uzbekistan (3)
- Vanuatu (1)
- Venezuela (4)
- Vietnam (1)
- Virgin Islands (2)
- Zambia (7)
- Zimbabwe (8)

Number of athletes by nation

Ranking	NOC	Athletes
1	United States	141
2	Australia	88
2	China	88
2	Italy	88
5	Germany	83
6	Japan	80
7	France	77
8	Great Britain and Northern Ireland	67
8	Jamaica	67
10	Kenya	62
11	Canada	59
11	Poland	59
13	Spain	55
14	Netherlands	53
15	South Africa	49
16	Brazil	47
17	Belgium	45
18	Ethiopia	36
19	Sweden	35
20	Portugal	32
21	Switzerland	31
22	Finland	29
23	Norway	28
24	Czech Republic	25
24	Ireland	25
26	Ukraine	23
27	Greece	21
27	Uganda	21
29	Turkey	20
30	India	19
30	Mexico	19
30	Morocco	19
33	Colombia	18
33	Hungary	18
35	Cuba	17
36	Bahamas	15
36	Nigeria	15
38	Chile	14
38	Ecuador	14
38	New Zealand	14
41	Botswana	12
41	Puerto Rico	12
41	Qatar	12
44	Lithuania	11
45	Algeria	10
45	Austria	10
45	Estonia	10
45	Peru	10
45	Slovenia	10
50	Denmark	9
50	Israel	9
50	Romania	9
50	Saint Kitts and Nevis	9
50	Uruguay	9
55	Bahrain	8
55	Croatia	8
55	Ghana	8
55	South Korea	8
55	Zimbabwe	8
60	Eritrea	7
61	Athlete Refugee Team	6
61	British Virgin Islands	6
61	Serbia	6
61	Zambia	6
65	Argentina	5
65	Cyprus	5
65	Ivory Coast	5
65	Saudi Arabia	5
69	Bulgaria	4
69	Burundi	4
69	Cambodia	4
69	Dominican Republic	4
69	Egypt	4
69	Grenada	4
69	Latvia	4
69	Luxembourg	4
69	Mongolia	4
69	Senegal	4
69	Trinidad and Tobago	4
69	Tunisia	4
69	Venezuela	4
82	Barbados	3
82	Costa Rica	3
82	Djibouti	3
82	Dominica	3
82	Guatemala	3
82	Iceland	3
82	Liberia	3
82	Rwanda	3
82	Sri Lanka	3
82	Uzbekistan	3
92	Armenia	2
92	Benin	2
92	Burkina Faso	2
92	Guinea	2
92	Haiti	2
92	North Macedonia	2
92	Namibia	2
92	Niger	2
92	Moldova	2
92	Panama	2
92	Paraguay	2
92	Philippines	2
92	Saint Lucia	2
92	Saint Vincent and the Grenadines	2
92	Singapore	2
92	Chinese Taipei	2
92	Tanzania	2
92	Thailand	2
92	Virgin Islands	2
92	Tuvalu	2
111	Afghanistan	1
111	Albania	1
111	American Samoa	1
111	Andorra	1
111	Angola	1
111	Anguilla	1
111	Antigua and Barbuda	1
111	Azerbaijan	1
111	Bangladesh	1
111	Belize	1
111	Bermuda	1
111	Bolivia	1
111	Bosnia and Herzegovina	1
111	Brunei	1
111	Cambodia	1
111	Cape Verde	1
111	Cayman Islands	1
111	Chad	1
111	Comoros	1
111	Republic of the Congo	1
111	Cook Islands	1
111	Democratic Republic of the Congo	1
111	El Salvador	1
111	Equatorial Guinea	1
111	Fiji	1
111	French Polynesia	1
111	Gabon	1
111	The Gambia	1
111	Georgia	1
111	Gibraltar	1
111	Guam	1
111	Guinea-Bissau	1
111	Guyana	1
111	Honduras	1
111	Hong Kong	1
111	Indonesia	1
111	Iraq	1
111	Iran	1
111	Jordan	1
111	Kiribati	1
111	Kuwait	1
111	Kyrgyzstan	1
111	Laos	1
111	Lebanon	1
111	Lesotho	1
111	Macau	1
111	Madagascar	1
111	Malawi	1
111	Malaysia	1
111	Maldives	1
111	Mali	1
111	Malta	1
111	Marshall Islands	1
111	Mauritius	1
111	Federated States of Micronesia	1
111	Montenegro	1
111	Montserrat	1
111	Mozambique	1
111	Myanmar	1
111	Nicaragua	1
111	Nauru	1
111	Nepal	1
111	Northern Mariana Islands	1
111	Oman	1
111	Pakistan	1
111	Palau	1
111	Palestine	1
111	Papua New Guinea	1
111	Saint Kitts and Nevis	1
111	Samoa	1
111	San Marino	1
111	São Tomé and Príncipe	1
111	Seychelles	1
111	Solomon Islands	1
111	South Sudan	1
111	Sudan	1
111	Suriname	1
111	Syria	1
111	Tajikistan	1
111	Timor-Leste	1
111	Tonga	1
111	Togo	1
111	Turkmenistan	1
111	Turks and Caicos Islands	1
111	Vanuatu	1
111	Vietnam	1
196	Total	2,107
