= Trinidad and Tobago at the 2022 World Athletics Championships =

- Flag of Trinidad and Tobago
- WA code: TTO
- National federation: National Association of Athletics Administrations of Trinidad & Tobago
- Website: ttnaaa.org

in Eugene, United States 15 July 2022 – 24 July 2022
- Competitors: 11 (8 men and 3 women) in 8 events
- Medals: Gold 0 Silver 0 Bronze 0 Total 0

World Athletics Championships appearances
- 1983; 1987; 1991; 1993; 1995; 1997; 1999; 2001; 2003; 2005; 2007; 2009; 2011; 2013; 2015; 2017; 2019; 2022; 2023; 2025

Trinidad and Tobago competed at the 2022 World Athletics Championships in Eugene, United States, from 15 to 24 July 2022.

== Results ==
Trinidad and Tobago entered 11 athletes.

Key

- Q = Qualified for the next round
- q = Qualified for the next round as a fastest loser or, in field events, by position without achieving the qualifying target
- NR = National record
- PB = Personal best
- SB = Season best
- N/A = Round not applicable for the event

=== Men ===
Track and road events

Athlete	Event	Preliminary		Heat		Semi-final		Final	
Athlete	Event	Result	Rank	Result	Rank	Result	Rank	Result	Rank
Jerod Elcock	100 metres	—N/a		10.22 (+0.1)	34	did not advance			
Eric Harrison Jr.	200 metres	—N/a		20.54 (−0.3)	25	did not advance			
Jereem Richards	200 metres	—N/a		20.35 (+0.0)	17 Q	19.86	4 q	20.08	6
Dwight St. Hillaire	400 metres	—N/a		46.60	33	did not advance			
Dwight St. Hillaire; Jereem Richards; Asa Guevara; Kashief King*; Shakeem Mc Kay	4 x 400 metres relay	—N/a		3:02.75 SB	7 q	—N/a		3:00.03	5 SB

Field events

Athlete	Event	Qualification		Final	
Athlete	Event	Distance	Position	Distance	Position
Keshorn Walcott	Javelin throw	78.87	16	did not advance	

=== Women ===
Track and road events

Athlete	Event	Heat		Semi-final		Final	
Athlete	Event	Result	Rank	Result	Rank	Result	Rank
Michelle-Lee Ahye	100 metres	11.18 (+0.1)	11 Q	11.24 (+0.4)	18	did not advance	

Field events

Athlete	Event	Qualification		Final	
Athlete	Event	Distance	Position	Distance	Position
Tyra Gittens	Long jump	6.44	19	did not advance	
Portious Warren	Shot put	16.65	25	did not advance	
