= Botswana at the 2025 World Athletics Championships =

- Flag of Botswana
- WA code: BOT

in Tokyo, Japan 13 September 2025 – 21 September 2025
- Competitors: 12 (11 men and 1 woman)
- Medals Ranked 5th: Gold 2 Silver 0 Bronze 1 Total 3

World Athletics Championships appearances
- 1983; 1987; 1991; 1993; 1995; 1997; 1999; 2001; 2003; 2005; 2007; 2009; 2011; 2013; 2015; 2017; 2019; 2022; 2023; 2025

Botswana competed at the 2025 World Athletics Championships in Tokyo, Japan, from 13 to 21 September 2025.

== Medallists ==
Medal	Name	Event	Date
Gold	Busang Collen Kebinatshipi	Men's 400 metres	18 September
(gold) Gold	Lee Eppie; Letsile Tebogo; Bayapo Ndori; Collen Kebinatshipi; Leungo Scotch*	Men's 4 × 400 metres relay	21 September
Bronze	Bayapo Ndori	Men's 400 metres	18 September

== Results ==
Botswana entered 12 athletes to the championships: 11 men and 1 woman.

Key

- Q = Qualified for the next round
- q = Qualified for the next round as a fastest loser or, in field events, by position without achieving the qualifying target
- NR = National record
- PB = Personal best
- SB = Season best
- N/A = Round not applicable for the event

=== Men ===
Track and road events

Athlete	Event	Heat		Semifinal		Final	
Athlete	Event	Result	Rank	Result	Rank	Result	Rank
Letsile Tebogo	100 metres	10.07	1 Q	9.94 SB	2 Q	Disqualified	
Letsile Tebogo	200 metres	20.18	1 Q	19.95	2 Q	19.65 SB	4
Lee Bhekempilo Eppie	400 metres	44.44	2 Q	44.51	2 Q	44,77	8
Busang Collen Kebinatshipi	400 metres	44.48 SB	4 q	43.61	1 Q	43,53 NR, WL	1st place, gold medalist(s)
Bayapo Ndori	400 metres	44.36	1 Q	44.21 SB	1 Q	44.20 SB	3rd place, bronze medalist(s)
Kethobogile Haingura	800 metres	1:45.02	3 Q	1:46.05	6	Did not advance	
Tshepiso Masalela	800 metres	1:44.74	2 Q	1:43.80	4 q	1:42.77	8
Victor Ntweng	400 metres hurdles	48.54 PB	3 Q	49.61	8	Did not advance	
Kemorena Tisang	400 metres hurdles	48.72	5 q	Disqualified		Did not advance	
Lee Bhekempilo Eppie; Busang Collen Kebinatshipi; Bayapo Ndori; Leungo Scotch*; Letsile Tebogo	4 × 400 metres relay	2:57.68 SB	1 Q	—N/a		2:57.76	1st place, gold medalist(s)

Women

Track and road events

Athlete	Event	Heat		Semifinal		Final	
Athlete	Event	Result	Rank	Result	Rank	Result	Rank
Oratile Nowe	800 metres	2:00.02	2 Q	1:58.43	4	Did not advance	
