= 2025 World Athletics Championships – Men's 400 metres =

Men's 400 metres at the 2025 World Athletics Championships
- Venue: National Stadium
- Location: Tokyo, Japan
- Dates: 14 September (heats); 16 September (semi-finals); 18 September (final)
- Competitors: 49 from 27 nations
- Winning time: 43.53 NR, WL

Medalists
gold medal	Collen Kebinatshipi	Botswana
silver medal	Jereem Richards	Trinidad and Tobago
bronze medal	Bayapo Ndori	Botswana

The men's 400 metres at the 2025 World Athletics Championships was held at the National Stadium in Tokyo on 14, 16 and 18 September 2025.

== Records ==
Before the competition records were as follows:

Record	Athlete & Nat.	Perf.	Location	Date
World record	Wayde van Niekerk (RSA)	43.03	Rio de Janeiro, Brazil	14 August 2016
Championship record	Michael Johnson (USA)	43.18	Seville, Spain	26 August 1999
World Leading	Zakithi Nene (RSA)	43.76	Nairobi, Kenya	31 May 2025
African Record	Wayde van Niekerk (RSA)	43.03	Rio de Janeiro, Brazil	14 August 2016
Asian Record	Youssef Ahmed Masrahi (KSA)	43.93	Beijing, China	23 August 2015
European Record	Matthew Hudson-Smith (GBR)	43.44	Paris, France	7 August 2024
North, Central American and Caribbean record	Michael Johnson (USA)	43.18	Seville, Spain	26 August 1999
Oceanian record	Darren Clark (AUS)	44.38	Seoul, South Korea	26 September 1988
South American Record	Anthony Zambrano (COL)	43.93	Tokyo, Japan	2 August 2021

The following records were set at the competition:

Record	Athlete & Nat.	Perf.	Date
World Leading	Collen Kebinatshipi (BOT)	43.53	18 September 2025

== Qualification standard ==
The standard to qualify automatically for entry was 44.85.

== Schedule ==
The event schedule, in local time (UTC+9), was as follows:

Date	Time	Round
14 September	18:35	Heats
16 September	21:35	Semi-finals
18 September	22:10	Final

== Results ==
=== Heats ===
The heats took place on 14 September. The first three athletes in each heat ( Q ) and the six fastest ( q ) qualify for the semi-finals.

==== Heat 1 ====
Place	Lane	Athlete	Nation	Time	Notes
1	7	Jereem Richards	Trinidad and Tobago	44.64	Q
2	4	Lythe Pillay	South Africa	44.73	Q, SB
3	5	Charlie Dobson	Great Britain & N.I.	44.85	Q
4	8	Daniel Segers	Belgium	45.04	
5	2	Fuga Sato	Japan	45.10	SB
6	6	Brian Tinega	Kenya	45.13	
7	9	Oleksandr Pohorilko	Ukraine	45.44	
8	3	Maksymilian Szwed	Poland	45.67	

==== Heat 2 ====
Place	Lane	Athlete	Nation	Time	Notes
1	5	Bayapo Ndori	Botswana	44.36	Q
2	4	Yuki Joseph Nakajima	Japan	44.44	Q, NR
3	9	Bovel McPherson	Jamaica	44.51	Q, PB
4	6	Matthew Hudson-Smith	Great Britain & N.I.	44.68	q
5	8	Elián Larregina	Argentina	44.97	
6	7	Alexander Doom	Belgium	45.10	
7	3	Cooper Sherman	Australia	45.53	
8	2	Chidi Okezie	Nigeria	45.66	

==== Heat 3 ====
Place	Lane	Athlete	Nation	Time	Notes
1	8	Jacory Patterson	United States	43.90	Q
2	4	Rusheen McDonald	Jamaica	44.38	Q, SB
3	9	Edoardo Scotti	Italy	44.45	Q, NR
4	6	Collen Kebinatshipi	Botswana	44.48	q, SB
5	5	Samuel Ogazi	Nigeria	45.97	
6	2	Jean Paul Bredau	Germany	46.05	
7	7	Jonas Phijffers	Netherlands	46.26	
8	3	Umar Osman	Malaysia	46.43	

==== Heat 4 ====
Place	Lane	Athlete	Nation	Time	Notes
1	7	Christopher Bailey	United States	44.49	Q
2	5	Reece Holder	Australia	44.54	Q, =SB
3	6	Muzala Samukonga	Zambia	44.56	Q
4	8	Samuel Reardon	Great Britain & N.I.	44.70	q
5	9	Patrik Simon Enyingi	Hungary	45.25	
6	4	Kevin Kipkorir	Kenya	45.39	
7	2	Lionel Spitz	Switzerland	45.57	
8	3	Eugene Omalla	Netherlands	45.97	

==== Heat 5 ====
Place	Lane	Athlete	Nation	Time	Notes
1	7	Zakithi Nene	South Africa	44.34	Q
2	5	Vernon Norwood	United States	44.55 [.544]	Q
3	8	Attila Molnár	Hungary	44.55 [.548]	Q, NR
4	2	Ammar Ibrahim	Qatar	44.63	q, PB
5	6	Rok Ferlan	Slovenia	44.91	q
6	9	Mihai Dringo	Romania	45.21	
7	3	Luca Sito	Italy	46.22	
8	4	Antonio Watson	Jamaica	46.23	

==== Heat 6 ====
Place	Lane	Athlete	Nation	Time	Notes
1	8	Khaleb McRae	United States	44.25	Q
2	6	Lee Eppie	Botswana	44.44	Q
3	5	Kirani James	Grenada	44.66	Q
4	3	Delano Kennedy	Jamaica	44.74	q, PB
5	7	George Mutinda	Kenya	45.07	
6	9	Christopher Morales Williams	Canada	45.26	
7	4	Alexander Ogando	Dominican Republic	45.59	
8	2	Isaya Klein Ikkink	Netherlands	46.32	

=== Semi-finals ===
The semi-finals took place on 16 September. The first two athletes in each heat ( Q ) and the two fastest ( q ) qualified for the final.

==== Heat 1 ====
Place	Lane	Athlete	Nation	Time	Notes
1	7	Zakithi Nene	South Africa	44.20	Q
2	6	Lee Eppie	Botswana	44.51	Q
3	8	Reece Holder	Australia	44.63	
4	2	Ammar Ibrahim	Qatar	44.74	
5	4	Attila Molnár	Hungary	44.94	
6	9	Bovel McPherson	Jamaica	44.99	
7	5	Christopher Bailey	United States	45.05	
8	3	Samuel Reardon	Great Britain & N.I.	45.10	

==== Heat 2 ====
Place	Lane	Athlete	Nation	Time	Notes
1	3	Collen Kebinatshipi	Botswana	43.61	Q, NR, WL
2	7	Rusheen McDonald	Jamaica	44.04	Q, SB
3	6	Jereem Richards	Trinidad and Tobago	44.12	q, SB
4	5	Jacory Patterson	United States	44.19	q
5	9	Edoardo Scotti	Italy	44.77	
6	8	Lythe Pillay	South Africa	44.82	
7	4	Charlie Dobson	Great Britain & N.I.	44.85	
8	2	Rok Ferlan	Slovenia	45.71	

==== Heat 3 ====
Place	Lane	Athlete	Nation	Time	Notes
1	5	Bayapo Ndori	Botswana	44.21	Q, SB
2	7	Yuki Joseph Nakajima	Japan	44.53	Q
3	9	Muzala Samukonga	Zambia	44.60	
4	6	Khaleb McRae	United States	44.82	
5	8	Vernon Norwood	United States	44.83	
6	2	Matthew Hudson-Smith	Great Britain & N.I.	44.95	
7	3	Delano Kennedy	Jamaica	44.97 [.970]	
7	4	Kirani James	Grenada	44.97 [.970]	

=== Final ===
Place	Lane	Athlete	Nation	Time	Notes
1st place, gold medalist(s)	5	Collen Kebinatshipi	Botswana	43.53	NR, WL
2nd place, silver medalist(s)	2	Jereem Richards	Trinidad and Tobago	43.72	NR
3rd place, bronze medalist(s)	8	Bayapo Ndori	Botswana	44.20	SB
4	6	Rusheen McDonald	Jamaica	44.28	
5	7	Zakithi Nene	South Africa	44.55	
6	9	Yuki Joseph Nakajima	Japan	44.62	
7	3	Jacory Patterson	United States	44.70	
8	4	Lee Eppie	Botswana	44.77	
