= Saint Kitts and Nevis at the 2019 World Athletics Championships =

Saint Kitts and Nevis at the 2019 World Championships in Athletics
- Flag of Saint Kitts and Nevis
- WA code: SKN
- National federation: Saint Kitts & Nevis Amateur Athletic Association
- Website: sknaaa.com

in Doha, Qatar 27 September 2019 – 6 October 2019
- Competitors: 1 in 1 event
- Medals: Gold 0 Silver 0 Bronze 0 Total 0

World Championships in Athletics appearances
- 1983; 1987; 1991; 1993; 1995; 1997; 1999; 2001; 2003; 2005; 2007; 2009; 2011; 2013; 2015; 2017; 2019; 2022; 2023

Saint Kitts and Nevis competed at the 2019 World Championships in Athletics in Doha, Qatar, from 27 September to 6 October 2019.

== Results ==
Key

- Q = Qualified for the next round
- q = Qualified for the next round as a fastest loser or, in field events, by position without achieving the qualifying target
- NR = National record
- PB = Personal best
- SB = Season best
- N/A = Round not applicable for the event

=== Men ===
Track and road events

Athlete	Event	Preliminaries		Heat		Semifinal		Final	
Athlete	Event	Result	Rank	Result	Rank	Result	Rank	Result	Rank
Hakeem Huggins	100 metres	10.49	5	10.62	44	Did not advance			
