= 2025 World Athletics Championships – Women's 100 metres =

Women's 100 metres at the 2025 World Athletics Championships
- Venue: National Stadium
- Location: Tokyo, Japan
- Dates: 13 September (heats); 14 September (semi-finals & final)
- Competitors: 61 from 44 nations
- Winning time: 10.61 CR, WL

Medalists
gold medal	Melissa Jefferson-Wooden	United States
silver medal	Tina Clayton	Jamaica
bronze medal	Julien Alfred	Saint Lucia

The women's 100 metres at the 2025 World Athletics Championships was held at the National Stadium in Tokyo on 13 and 14 September 2025.

== Summary ==
After taking silver in the Olympics, defending champion Sha'Carri Richardson's 2025 season was more dominated by off-track drama than on-track results. With a bye, she didn't need to demonstrate her fitness in early season races. The world leader was Melissa Jefferson-Wooden who ran off a series of sub 10.8 performances topped off by her 10.65 at the US Championships which tied her for #5 of all time. Her closest challenger looked to be Olympic Champion Julien Alfred, who would have had an undefeated season save her loss to Jefferson-Wooden at the Prefontaine Classic.

In the first three heats, only Jefferson-Wooden dipped under 11 seconds. In the fourth heat, Alfred ran a 10.93 as the fastest qualifier. Daryll Neita was the only other one under 11 seconds. She would, however, not get out of the semis, finishing fourth in the first semi behind now Masters athlete Marie Josée Ta Lou-Smith, Shericka Jackson (who was also tied for #5 all time) and Richardson's season best 11.00. Alfred dominated the second semi with another 10.93 ahead of another Masters athlete, five time champion Shelly-Ann Fraser-Pryce (#3 all time) making her eighth World Championship final. Then Jefferson-Wooden blew apart the third semi final with a 10.73, ahead of Tina Clayton's 10.90 and final time qualifier Dina Asher-Smith. With Alfred and Ta Lou-Smith tied for #9 on the all-time list, the final would feature six of the top ten fastest women of all time.

In the final, Jefferson-Wooden was out fast. Only Clayton seemed in a position to challenge, Jefferson-Wooden stayed focused on the finish line separating from the field. Clearly behind them, Alfred won the battle for third finishing .04 ahead of Jackson, while Richardson's season best 10.94 was only good enough for fifth.

Jefferson-Wooden's personal best 10.61 moved her past Carmelita Jeter into sole possession of the #4 time ever, breaking Richardson's Championship Record. Clayton's 10.76 moved her to a tie for #15 of all time. At 21, she is one of the youngest medalist in the history of the event.

== Records ==
Before the competition records were as follows:

Record	Athlete & Nat.	Perf.	Location	Date
World Record	Florence Griffith Joyner (USA)	10.49	Indianapolis, United States	16 July 1988
Championship Record	Sha'Carri Richardson (USA)	10.65	Budapest, Hungary	21 August 2023
World Leading	Melissa Jefferson-Wooden (USA)	10.65	Eugene, United States	1 August 2025
African Record	Marie-Josée Ta Lou (CIV)	10.72	Fontvieille, Monaco	10 August 2022
Asian Record	Xuemei Li (CHN)	10.79	Shanghai, China	18 October 1997
European Record	Christine Arron (FRA)	10.73	Budapest, Hungary	19 August 1998
North, Central American and Caribbean Record	Florence Griffith Joyner (USA)	10.49	Indianapolis, United States	16 July 1988
Oceanian Record	Zoe Hobbs (NZL)	10.94	Ostrava, Czech Republic	25 June 2025
South American Record	Rosângela Santos (BRA)	10.91	London, United Kingdom	6 August 2017

== Qualification standard ==
The standard to qualify automatically for entry was 11.07.

== Schedule ==
The event schedule, in local time (UTC+9), was as follows:

Date	Time	Round
13 September	18:55	Heats
14 September	20:20	Semi-finals
14 September	22:13	Final

== Results ==
=== Heats ===
The heats took place on 13 September. The first three athletes in each heat ( Q ) and the next three fastest ( q ) qualified for the semi-finals.

==== Heat 1 ====
Place	Lane	Athlete	Nation	Time	Notes
1	6	Melissa Jefferson-Wooden	United States	10.99	Q
2	7	Zoe Hobbs	New Zealand	11.16	Q
3	4	Géraldine Frey	Switzerland	11.25	Q
4	5	Sade McCreath	Canada	11.41	
5	3	Lisa Mayer	Germany	11.45	
6	8	Bree Rizzo	Australia	11.45	
7	9	Julia Henriksson	Sweden	11.49	
8	1	Valentina Meredova	Turkmenistan	12.13	
9	2	Lujain Ibrahim Al-Humaid	Saudi Arabia	12.68	
				Wind: (−0.9 m/s)	

==== Heat 2 ====
Place	Lane	Athlete	Nation	Time	Notes
1	5	Tina Clayton	Jamaica	11.01	Q
2	6	Dina Asher-Smith	Great Britain & N.I.	11.07	Q
3	4	Ewa Swoboda	Poland	11.18	Q
4	1	Rani Rosius	Belgium	11.25	SB
5	7	Rosemary Chukwuma	Nigeria	11.27	
6	3	Lorène Bazolo	Portugal	11.34	
7	8	Karolína Maňasová	Czech Republic	11.37	
8	2	Fayza Issaka Abdoukerim	Togo	12.00	
9	9	Estelle Short	Cook Islands	12.55	SB
				Wind: (−0.4 m/s)	

==== Heat 3 ====
Place	Lane	Athlete	Nation	Time	Notes
1	7	Sha'Carri Richardson	United States	11.03	Q, SB
2	5	Shericka Jackson	Jamaica	11.04	Q
3	8	Torrie Lewis	Australia	11.08	Q, NR
4	6	Gina Lückenkemper	Germany	11.12	q
5	4	Anthaya Charlton	Bahamas	11.18	q
6	3	Herverge Etame Kole	Cameroon	11.55	
7	2	Pierrick-Linda Moulin	Gabon	11.58	
8	9	Natacha Ngoye	Congo	11.88	
				Wind: (−0.8 m/s)	

==== Heat 4 ====
Place	Lane	Athlete	Nation	Time	Notes
1	6	Julien Alfred	Saint Lucia	10.93	Q
2	3	Salomé Kora	Switzerland	11.23	Q
3	5	Audrey Leduc	Canada	11.26	Q
4	9	Polyniki Emmanouilidou	Greece	11.36	
5	4	Camille Rutherford	Bahamas	11.40	
6	7	Maboundou Koné	Ivory Coast	11.42	
7	8	Marlet Ospino	Colombia	11.63	
8	2	Nyasha Harris	Belize	12.25	
9	1	Chloe David	Vanuatu	12.40	PB
				Wind: (±0.0 m/s)	

==== Heat 5 ====
Place	Lane	Athlete	Nation	Time	Notes
1	5	Daryll Neita	Great Britain & N.I.	10.94	Q, SB
2	4	Twanisha Terry	United States	11.06	Q
3	7	Thelma Davies	Liberia	11.12	Q
4	6	Boglárka Takács	Hungary	11.12	q
5	3	Ana Carolina Azevedo	Brazil	11.24	
6	8	Liang Xiaojing	China	11.29	
7	2	Ella Connolly	Australia	11.43	
8	1	Alessandra Gasparelli	San Marino	11.78	
—	9	Alisar Youssef	Syria	DNS	
				Wind: (+0.5 m/s)	

==== Heat 6 ====
Place	Lane	Athlete	Nation	Time	Notes
1	4	Zaynab Dosso	Italy	11.10	Q
2	7	Amy Hunt	Great Britain & N.I.	11.13	Q
3	5	Kayla White	United States	11.16	Q
4	6	Leah Bertrand	Trinidad and Tobago	11.29	
5	8	Destiny Smith-Barnett	Liberia	11.33	
6	3	Viktória Forster	Slovakia	11.43	
7	2	Edna Ngandula	Zambia	11.59	PB
8	1	Rori Lowe	Honduras	11.93	NR
9	9	Gorete Semedo	São Tomé and Príncipe	11.98	
				Wind: (−0.1 m/s)	

==== Heat 7 ====
Place	Lane	Athlete	Nation	Time	Notes
1	4	Marie Josée Ta Lou-Smith	Ivory Coast	11.05	Q
2	6	Shelly-Ann Fraser-Pryce	Jamaica	11.09	Q
3	5	Liranyi Alonso	Dominican Republic	11.26	Q
4	7	Patrizia Van der Weken	Luxembourg	11.29	
5	3	Sina Mayer	Germany	11.41	
6	8	Gladymar Torres	Puerto Rico	11.52	
7	2	Tri-Tania Lowe	Anguilla	11.59	
8	9	María Ignacia Montt	Chile	11.68	
				Wind: (−0.4 m/s)	

=== Semi-finals ===
The heats took place on 14 September. The first two athletes in each heat ( Q ) and the next two fastest ( q ) qualified for the final.

==== Heat 1 ====
Place	Lane	Athlete	Nation	Time	Notes
1	4	Marie Josée Ta Lou-Smith	Ivory Coast	10.94	Q
2	7	Shericka Jackson	Jamaica	10.97	Q
3	6	Sha'Carri Richardson	United States	11.00	q, SB
4	5	Daryll Neita	Great Britain & N.I.	11.06	
5	9	Liranyi Alonso	Dominican Republic	11.16	
6	3	Kayla White	United States	11.20	
7	8	Salomé Kora	Switzerland	11.30	
8	2	Boglárka Takács	Hungary	11.32	
				Wind: (−0.3 m/s)	

==== Heat 2 ====
Place	Lane	Athlete	Nation	Time	Notes
1	4	Julien Alfred	Saint Lucia	10.93	Q
2	5	Shelly-Ann Fraser-Pryce	Jamaica	11.00	Q
3	7	Amy Hunt	Great Britain & N.I.	11.05	
4	6	Twanisha Terry	United States	11.07	
5	3	Zoe Hobbs	New Zealand	11.09	
6	2	Anthaya Charlton	Bahamas	11.14	
7	9	Géraldine Frey	Switzerland	11.34	
8	8	Ewa Swoboda	Poland	11.36	
				Wind: (+0.1 m/s)	

==== Heat 3 ====
Place	Lane	Athlete	Nation	Time	Notes
1	6	Melissa Jefferson-Wooden	United States	10.73	Q
2	5	Tina Clayton	Jamaica	10.90	Q
3	4	Dina Asher-Smith	Great Britain & N.I.	11.02	q
4	2	Gina Lückenkemper	Germany	11.11	
5	8	Torrie Lewis	Australia	11.14	
6	7	Zaynab Dosso	Italy	11.22	
7	3	Thelma Davies	Liberia	11.24	
8	9	Audrey Leduc	Canada	11.34	
				Wind: (+0.2 m/s)	

=== Final ===
Place	Lane	Athlete	Nation	Time	Notes
1st place, gold medalist(s)	4	Melissa Jefferson-Wooden	United States	10.61	CR, WL, PB
2nd place, silver medalist(s)	6	Tina Clayton	Jamaica	10.76	PB
3rd place, bronze medalist(s)	5	Julien Alfred	Saint Lucia	10.84	
4	3	Shericka Jackson	Jamaica	10.88	=SB
5	2	Sha'Carri Richardson	United States	10.94	SB
6	8	Shelly-Ann Fraser-Pryce	Jamaica	11.03	
7	7	Marie Josée Ta Lou-Smith	Ivory Coast	11.04	
8	9	Dina Asher-Smith	Great Britain & N.I.	11.08	
				Wind: (+0.3 m/s)	
