= Papua New Guinea at the 2022 World Athletics Championships =

- Flag of Papua New Guinea
- WA code: PNG

in Eugene, United States 15 July 2022 – 24 July 2022
- Competitors: 1 (1 man)
- Medals: Gold 0 Silver 0 Bronze 0 Total 0

World Athletics Championships appearances
- 1983; 1987; 1991; 1993; 1995; 1997; 1999; 2001; 2003; 2005; 2007; 2009; 2011; 2013; 2015; 2017; 2019; 2022; 2023; 2025

Papua New Guinea competed at the 2022 World Athletics Championships in Eugene, Oregon, United States, which were held from 15 to 24 July 2022. The athlete delegation of the territory was composed of one competitor, sprinter Terrence Talio. He competed in the preliminary heats of the men's 200 metres but was disqualified due to lane infringement.

== Background ==
The 2022 World Athletics Championships in Eugene, Oregon, United States, were held from 15 to 24 July 2022. To qualify for the World Championships, athletes had to reach an entry standard (e.g. time and distance), place in a specific position at select competitions, be a wild card entry, or qualify through their World Athletics Ranking at the end of the qualification period.

As Papua New Guinea did not meet any of the four standards, they could send either one male or one female athlete in one event of the Championships who has not yet qualified. Athletics Papua New Guinea selected sprinter Terrence Talio who would compete in the men's 200 metres. At the time of his selection, he had a personal best of 21.55 seconds in the event and was unranked within the World Athletics Rankings. Previously, Talio had represented Papua New Guinea at the 2022 Oceania Athletics Championships and 2022 Pacific Mini Games.

== Results ==
Key

- Q = Qualified for the next round
- q = Qualified for the next round as a fastest loser or, in field events, by position without achieving the qualifying target
- NR = National record
- PB = Personal best
- SB = Season best
- N/A = Round not applicable for the event

=== Men ===
Talio competed in the first preliminary heat of the men's 200 metres on 18 July against six other athletes. There, he was disqualified due to lane infringement and was thus unranked, failing to advance further to the semifinals as only the top three of each heat and the three next fastest would only be able to do so.

Track and road events

| Athlete | Event | Heat | | Semi-final | | Final | |
| Athlete | Event | Result | Rank | Result | Rank | Result | Rank |
|---|---|---|---|---|---|---|---|
| Terrence Talio | 200 metres | DQ | | did not advance | | | |
