= Saint Kitts and Nevis at the 2015 World Championships in Athletics =

- WA code: SKN

in Beijing
- Competitors: 3
- Medals: Gold 0 Silver 0 Bronze 0 Total 0

World Championships in Athletics appearances
- 1983; 1987; 1991; 1993; 1995; 1997; 1999; 2001; 2003; 2005; 2007; 2009; 2011; 2013; 2015; 2017; 2019; 2022; 2023

Saint Kitts and Nevis competed at the 2015 World Championships in Athletics in Beijing, China, from 22 to 30 August 2015.

== Results ==
(q – qualified, NM – no mark, SB – season best)

=== Men ===
Track and road events

Athlete	Event	Heat		Semifinal		Final	
Athlete	Event	Result	Rank	Result	Rank	Result	Rank
Kim Collins	100 metres	10.16	26	did not advance			
Brijesh Lawrence	100 metres	10.40	39	did not advance			
Antoine Adams	100 metres	10.23	31	did not advance			
Antoine Adams	200 metres	20.75	39	did not advance			
