= Republic of the Congo at the 2015 World Championships in Athletics =

- WA code: CGO

in Beijing
- Competitors: 1
- Medals: Gold 0 Silver 0 Bronze 0 Total 0

World Championships in Athletics appearances
- 1987; 1991; 1993; 1995; 1997; 1999; 2001; 2003; 2005; 2007–2009; 2011; 2013; 2015; 2017; 2019; 2022; 2023; 2025

Congo competed at the 2015 World Championships in Athletics in Beijing, China, from 22 August 2015 to 30 August 2015.

== Results ==
(q – qualified, NM – no mark, SB – season best)

=== Men ===
Field events

Athlete	Event	Qualification		Final	
Athlete	Event	Distance	Position	Distance	Position
Franck Elemba	Shot put	19.40	21	Did not advance	
