= Papua New Guinea at the 2023 World Athletics Championships =

- Flag of Papua New Guinea
- WA code: PNG

in Budapest, Hungary 19 August 2023 – 27 August 2023
- Competitors: 1 (1 man and 0 women)
- Medals: Gold 0 Silver 0 Bronze 0 Total 0

World Athletics Championships appearances
- 1983; 1987; 1991; 1993; 1995; 1997; 1999; 2001; 2003; 2005; 2007; 2009; 2011; 2013; 2015; 2017; 2019; 2022; 2023

Papua New Guinea competed at the 2023 World Athletics Championships in Budapest, Hungary, which were held from 19 to 27 August 2023. The athlete delegation of the country was composed of one competitor, sprinter Leroy Kamau who would compete in the men's 200 metres. He qualified upon being selected by Athletics Papua New Guinea and aimed to break his personal best. Alsadi placed eighth in his heat out of the nine competitors that competed in his heat and did not advance to the semifinals.

== Background ==
The 2023 World Athletics Championships in Budapest, Hungary, were held from 19 to 27 August 2023. The Championships were held at the National Athletics Centre. To qualify for the World Championships, athletes had to reach an entry standard (e.g. time or distance), place in a specific position at select competitions, be a wild card entry, or qualify through their World Athletics Ranking at the end of the qualification period.

As Papua New Guinea did not meet any of the four standards, they could send either one male or one female athlete in one event of the Championships who has not yet qualified. Athletics Papua New Guinea selected sprinter Leroy Kamau who would make his World Championships debut at this edition of the event. At the time, he was unranked in the world for the event. Kamau was initially entered in the men's 100 metres but this was changed. Before the championships, Kamau trained in Port Moresby with his coach and aimed to break his own personal best of 20.99 seconds.

== Results ==
Key

- Q = Qualified for the next round
- q = Qualified for the next round as a fastest loser or, in field events, by position without achieving the qualifying target
- NR = National record
- PB = Personal best
- SB = Season best
- N/A = Round not applicable for the event

=== Men ===
Kamau competed in the heats of the men's 200 metres on 23 August against eight other competitors. He raced in the second heat and recorded a time of 21.18 for a new season's best. He placed eighth in his heat and did not advance to the semifinals of the event.

Track and road events

Athlete	Event	Heat		Semifinal		Final	
Athlete	Event	Result	Rank	Result	Rank	Result	Rank
Leroy Kamau	200 metres	21.18 SB	8	Did not advance			
