= Saint Kitts and Nevis at the 2013 World Championships in Athletics =

- WA code: SKN

in Moscow
- Competitors: 6
- Medals: Gold 0 Silver 0 Bronze 0 Total 0

World Championships in Athletics appearances
- 1983; 1987; 1991; 1993; 1995; 1997; 1999; 2001; 2003; 2005; 2007; 2009; 2011; 2013; 2015; 2017; 2019; 2022; 2023

Saint Kitts and Nevis is competing at the 2013 World Championships in Athletics in Moscow, Russia, from 10–18 August 2013. A team of 6 athletes was announced to represent the country in the event.

== Results ==
(q – qualified, NM – no mark, SB – season best)

=== Men ===
Athlete	Event	Preliminaries		Heats		Semifinals		Final	
Athlete	Event	Time	Rank	Time	Rank	Time	Rank	Time	Rank
Antoine Adams	100 metres	bye round		10.18	18 q	10.17	16	did not advance	
Jason Rogers	100 metres	bye round		10.19	19 Q	10.15	13	did not advance	
Antoine Adams	200 metres			20.56	16 Q	20.47	13	did not advance	
Lestrod Roland	200 metres			21.37	43	did not advance			
Antoine Adams; Allistar Clarke; Delwayne Delaney; Brijesh Lawrence; Jason Rogers; Lestrod Roland	4 × 100 metres relay								
