= Papua New Guinea at the 1983 World Championships in Athletics =

- Flag of Papua New Guinea
- WA code: PNG

in Helsinki, Finland August 7–14, 1983
- Competitors: 2 (1 man and 1 woman) in 4 events
- Medals: Gold 0 Silver 0 Bronze 0 Total 0

World Championships in Athletics appearances
- 1983; 1987; 1991; 1993; 1995; 1997; 1999; 2001; 2003; 2005; 2007; 2009; 2011; 2013; 2015; 2017; 2019; 2022; 2023

Papua New Guinea competed at the 1983 World Championships in Athletics in Helsinki, Finland, from August 7 to 14, 1983.

== Men ==
Track and road events

Athlete	Event	Heat		Quarterfinal		Semifinal		Final	
Athlete	Event	Result	Rank	Result	Rank	Result	Rank	Result	Rank
Paiwa Bogela	400 metres	Did not start		Did not advance					
Paiwa Bogela	400 metres hurdles	54.68	32	—		Did not advance			

== Women ==
Track and road events

Athlete	Event	Heat		Quarterfinal		Semifinal		Final	
Athlete	Event	Result	Rank	Result	Rank	Result	Rank	Result	Rank
Elanga Buala	200 metres	25.59	32 q	DNS		Did not advance			
Elanga Buala	400 metres	57.37	26 q	56.96	23	Did not advance			
