= Papua New Guinea at the 2019 World Athletics Championships =

Papua New Guinea at the 2019 World Championships in Athletics
- Flag of Papua New Guinea
- WA code: PNG
- National federation: Athletics Papua New Guinea
- Website: Official website

in Doha, Qatar 2019
- Competitors: 1 (1 woman) in 1 event
- Medals: Gold 0 Silver 0 Bronze 0 Total 0

World Championships in Athletics appearances
- 1983; 1987; 1991; 1993; 1995; 1997; 1999; 2001; 2003; 2005; 2007; 2009; 2011; 2013; 2015; 2017; 2019; 2022; 2023

Papua New Guinea competed at the 2019 World Championships in Athletics in Doha, Qatar, from 27 September 2019.

Rellie Kaputin, initially selected, was replaced by another athlete due to her injury in August.

== Results ==
=== Women ===
Track and road events

Athlete	Event	Heat		Semifinal		Final	
Athlete	Event	Result	Rank	Result	Rank	Result	Rank
Adrine Monagi	100 m hurdles	14.00	35	Did not advance			
