= Trinidad and Tobago at the 2015 World Championships in Athletics =

- WA code: TTO

in Beijing
- Competitors: 19
- Medals Ranked 22nd: Gold 0 Silver 1 Bronze 1 Total 2

World Championships in Athletics appearances
- 1983; 1987; 1991; 1993; 1995; 1997; 1999; 2001; 2003; 2005; 2007; 2009; 2011; 2013; 2015; 2017; 2019; 2022; 2023

Trinidad and Tobago competed at the 2015 World Championships in Athletics in Beijing, China, from 22 to 30 August 2015.

== Medalists ==
The following competitors from Trinidad and Tobago won medals at the Championships

Medal	Athlete	Event	Date
Silver	Renny Quow; Lalonde Gordon; Deon Lendore; Machel Cedenio; Jarrin Solomon*	Men's 4 × 400 metres relay	30 August
Bronze	Kelly-Ann Baptiste; Michelle-Lee Ahye; Reyare Thomas; Semoy Hackett; Khalifa St. Fort*	Women's 4 × 100 metres relay	29 August

== Results ==
(q – qualified, NM – no mark, SB – season best)

=== Men ===
Track and road events

Athlete	Event	Heat		Semifinal		Final	
Athlete	Event	Result	Rank	Result	Rank	Result	Rank
Keston Bledman	100 metres	10.75	50	did not advance			
Rondel Sorrillo	100 metres	DNS		did not advance			
Kyle Greaux	200 metres	20.51	31	did not advance			
Machel Cedenio	400 metres	44.54	8 Q	44.64	8 q	45.06	7
Renny Quow	400 metres	44.54 SB	8 Q	44.98	16	did not advance	
Lalonde Gordon	400 metres	44.97	18 Q	44.70	9	did not advance	
Mikel Thomas	110 metres hurdles	DQ		did not advance			
Jehue Gordon	400 metres hurdles	49.91	31	did not advance			
Renny Quow; Lalonde Gordon; Deon Lendore; Machel Cedenio; Jarrin Solomon*	4 × 400 metres relay	2:58.67 SB	2 Q	—		2:58.20 NR	2nd place, silver medalist(s)

Field events

Athlete	Event	Qualification		Final	
Athlete	Event	Result	Rank	Result	Rank
Keshorn Walcott	Javelin throw	76.83	26	did not advance	

=== Women ===
Track and road events

Athlete	Event	Heat		Semifinal		Final	
Athlete	Event	Result	Rank	Result	Rank	Result	Rank
Michelle-Lee Ahye	100 metres	10.98	4 Q	10.97 SB	8 Q	10.98	5
Kelly-Ann Baptiste	100 metres	11.13	13 Q	10.90	6 Q	11.01	6
Semoy Hackett	100 metres	11.16 SB	15 Q	11.13 SB	14	did not advance	
Semoy Hackett	200 metres	22.89	11 Q	22.75	11	did not advance	
Reyare Thomas	200 metres	23.09	22 Q	23.03	18	did not advance	
Kamaria Durant	200 metres	23.25	30	did not advance			
Sparkle McKnight	400 metres hurdles	55.77	15 Q	56.21	17	did not advance	
Kelly-Ann Baptiste; Michelle-Lee Ahye; Reyare Thomas; Semoy Hackett; Khalifa St. Fort*	4 × 100 metres relay	42.24 NR	3 Q	—		42.03 NR	3rd place, bronze medalist(s)

Field events

Athlete	Event	Qualification		Final	
Athlete	Event	Result	Rank	Result	Rank
Cleopatra Borel	Shot put	18.55	6 Q	17.43	12
