= Republic of the Congo at the 2011 World Championships in Athletics =

- WA code: CGO
- National federation: Fédération Congolaise d'Athlétisme
- Website: www.athlecongo.com

in Daegu
- Competitors: 1
- Medals: Gold 0 Silver 0 Bronze 0 Total 0

World Championships in Athletics appearances
- 1987; 1991; 1993; 1995; 1997; 1999; 2001; 2003; 2005; 2007–2009; 2011; 2013; 2015; 2017; 2019; 2022; 2023

The Republic of the Congo competed at the 2011 World Championships in Athletics from August 27 to September 4 in Daegu, South Korea. One athlete was announced to represent the country in the event.

== Results ==
=== Men ===
| Athlete | Event | Preliminaries | | Heats | | Semifinals | | Final | |
| Athlete | Event | Time Width Height | Rank | Time Width Height | Rank | Time Width Height | Rank | Time Width Height | Rank |
|---|---|---|---|---|---|---|---|---|---|
| Delivert Arsene Kimbembe | 100 metres | 10.85 | 10 (q) | 10.94 | 49 | Did not advance | | | |
