= Trinidad and Tobago at the 2009 World Championships in Athletics =

- WA code: TRI

in Berlin
- Competitors: 20
- Medals: Gold 0 Silver 1 Bronze 2 Total 3

World Championships in Athletics appearances
- 1983; 1987; 1991; 1993; 1995; 1997; 1999; 2001; 2003; 2005; 2007; 2009; 2011; 2013; 2015; 2017; 2019; 2022; 2023

Trinidad and Tobago competed at the 2009 World Championships in Athletics from 15–23 August. A team of 20 athletes was announced in preparation for the competition. Selected athletes had achieved one of the competition's qualifying standards.

== Team selection ==
Track and road events

Event	Athletes	
Event	Men	Women
100 metres	Darrel Brown; Marc Burns; Emmanuel Callender; Richard Thompson	Kelly-Ann Baptiste; Semoy Hackett; Ayanna Hutchinson
200 metres	Aaron Armstrong; Emmanuel Callender; Rondel Sorrillo; Richard Thompson	Kelly-Ann Baptiste; Semoy Hackett
400 metres	Renny Quow; Jarrin Solomon	
100 metre hurdles	—	Aleesha Barber
400 metre hurdles	Jehue Gordon	Josanne Lucas
4 x 100 metres relay	Unknown	

Field and combined events

Event	Athletes	
Event	Men	Women
Shot put		Annie Alexander; Cleopatra Borel-Brown
