= Iuliia Andreeva =

Kyrgyzstani long-distance runner

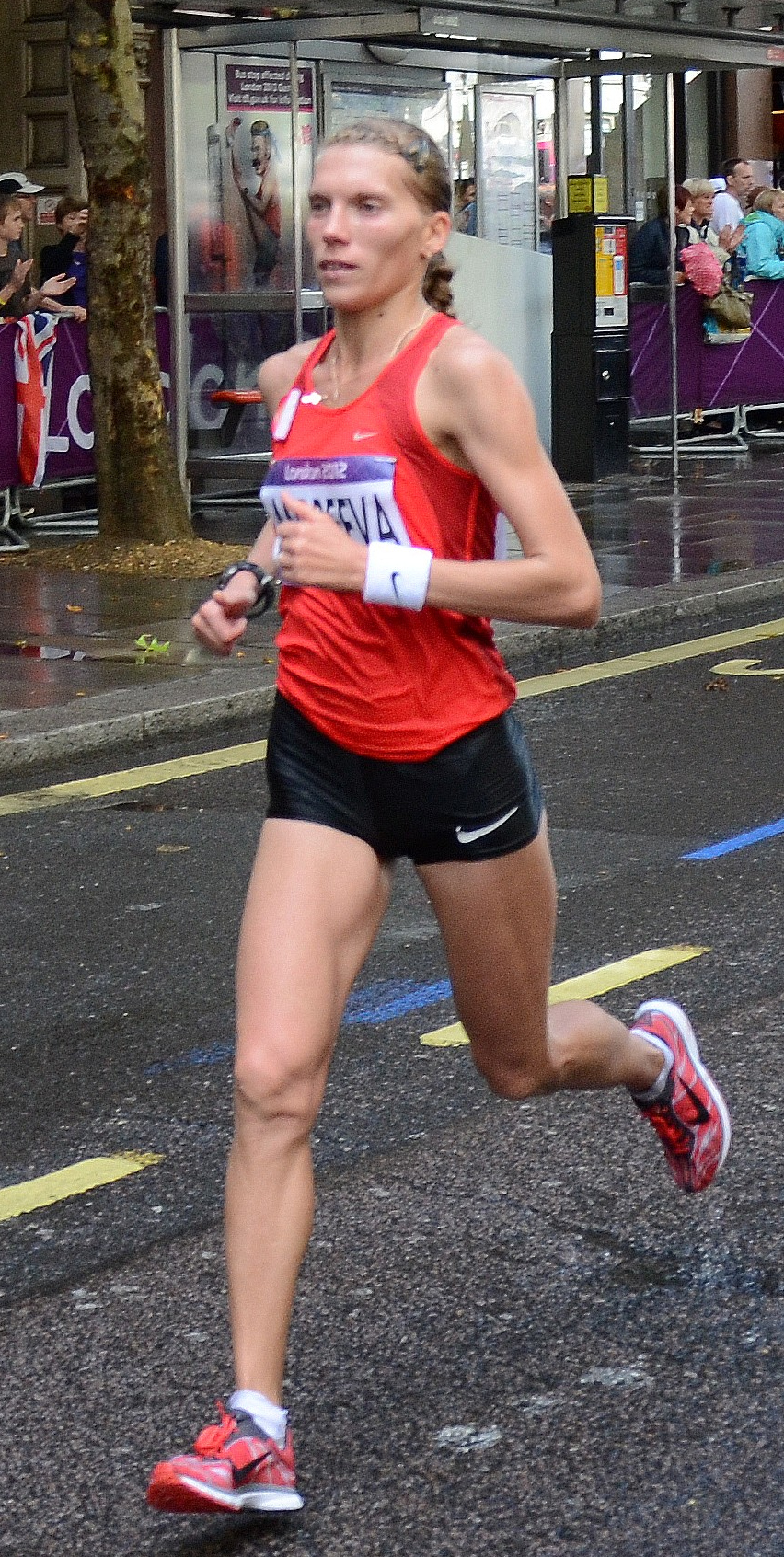
- Andreeva at the 2012 Olympics

Personal information
- Full name: Iuliia Vladimirovna Andreeva; Юлия Владимировна Андреева
- Born: 7 March 1981 (age 45) Frunze, Kirghizia, Soviet Union
- Height: 1.68 m (5 ft 6 in)
- Weight: 51 kg (112 lb)
- Spouse: Grigoriy Andreev

Sport
- Country: Kyrgyzstan
- Sport: Athletics
- Events: Marathon, 10,000 m
- Coached by: Grigoriy Andreev

Achievements and titles
- Personal bests: 10,000 m – 33:27.21 (2008); Mar – 2:30:58 (2012)

Iuliia Vladimirovna Andreeva (née Arkhipova born 7 March 1981) is a Kyrgyzstani long-distance runner. She competed in the marathon at the 2008, 2012 and 2016 Olympics and placed 58th–59th. She has qualified for the 2020 Summer Olympics in the women's marathon event.

She is married to and is coached by the Olympic marathon runner Grigoriy Andreyev, they have one daughter.
