= Devilert Arsene Kimbembe =

Congolese sprinter

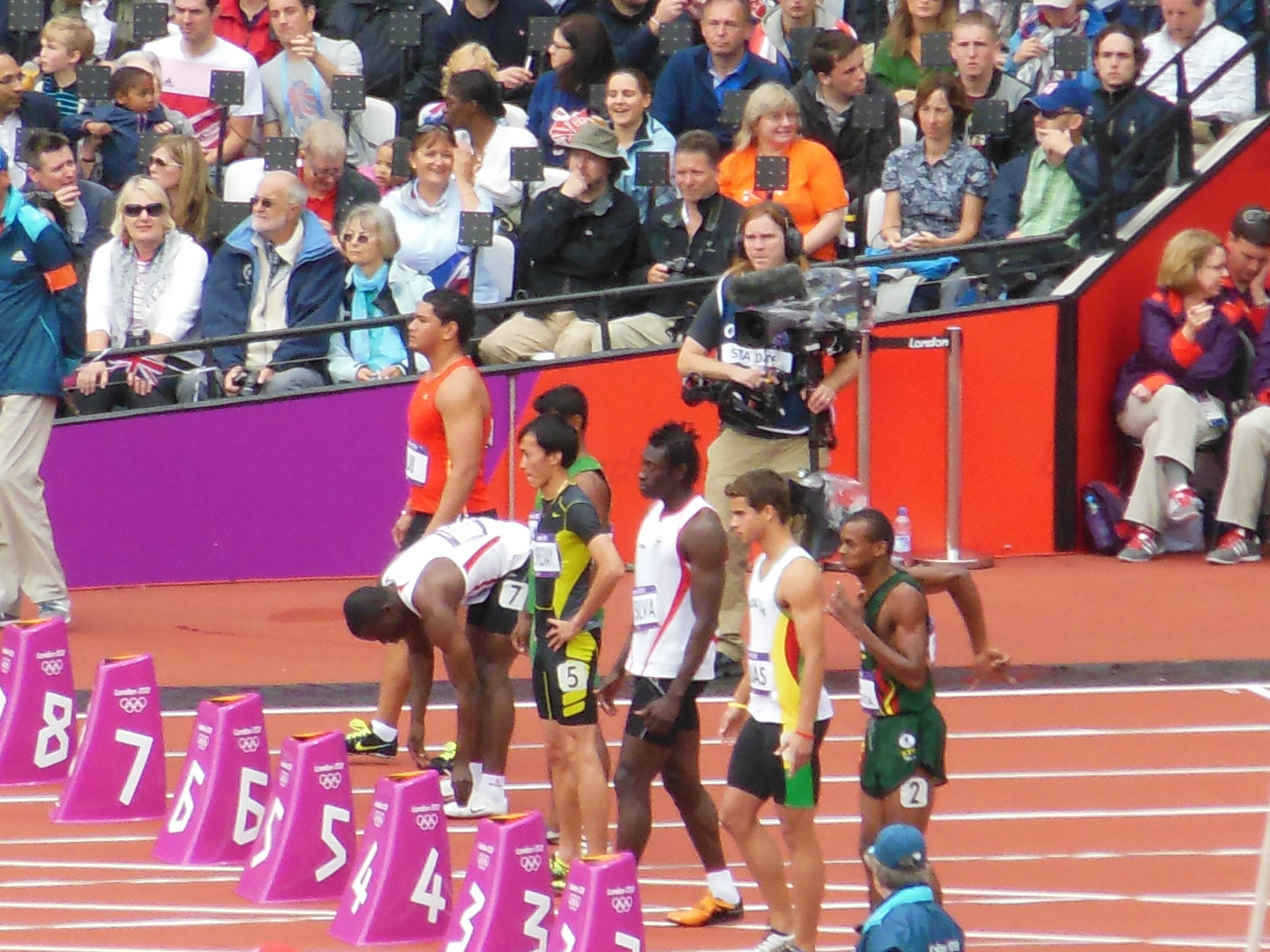
Kimbembe before the start of heat 1 of the 100 m at the 2012 Summer Olympics.

Devilert Arsene Kimbembe (born 1984 in Brazzaville) is a Congolese sprinter. He competed in the Men's 100m event at the 2012 Summer Olympics where he qualified in the preliminaries with a seasonal best time of 10.68 but was eliminated in the first round.
