= St. Kitts Nevis Athletics =

Governing body for athletics in Saint Kitts and Nevis

- Sport: Athletics
- Jurisdiction: Association
- Abbreviation: SKNA
- Founded: 1961
- Affiliation: World Athletics
- Affiliation date: 1978
- Regional affiliation: NACAC
- Headquarters: Basseterre
- President: Glenville Jeffers
- Vice president: Val Henry
- Secretary: Francil Morris
- Replaced: Saint Kitts Amateur Athletic and Cycling Association
- (Saint Kitts and Nevis)

St. Kitts Nevis Athletics, until 2018 the Saint Kitts & Nevis Amateur Athletic Association (SKNAAA), is the governing body for the sport of athletics in Saint Kitts and Nevis.

== History ==
SKNAAA was founded in 1961. After separating from the Saint Kitts Amateur Athletic and Cycling Association in 1977, SKNAAA was affiliated to the IAAF (now World Athletics) in 1978.

Current president is Glenville Jeffers. He was elected in December 2009 and re-elected in January 2014.

It was renamed to St. Kitts Nevis Athletics in 2018.

== Affiliations ==
SKNAAA is the national member federation for Saint Kitts and Nevis in the following international organisations:

- International Association of Athletics Federations (IAAF)
- North American, Central American and Caribbean Athletic Association (NACAC)
- Association of Panamerican Athletics (APA)
- Central American and Caribbean Athletic Confederation (CACAC)
- Leeward Islands Athletic Association (LIAA)^{†}

^{†}: The Nevis Amateur Athletic Association (NAAA) is separately affiliated to the LIAA.

Moreover, it is part of the following national organisations:

- Saint Kitts and Nevis Olympic Committee (SKNOC)

== National records ==
SKNAAA maintains the Saint Kitts and Nevis records in athletics.
