= Vanuatu at the World Athletics Championships =

- WA code: VAN
- National federation: Athletics Vanuatu
- Website: athletics-oceania.com/vanuatu/
- Medals: Gold 0 Silver 0 Bronze 0 Total 0

World Athletics Championships appearances (overview)
- 1983; 1987; 1991; 1993; 1995; 1997; 1999; 2001; 2003; 2005; 2007; 2009; 2011; 2013; 2015; 2017; 2019; 2022; 2023; 2025

Vanuatu has competed at every edition of the World Athletics Championships since its inception in 1983. Its competing country code is VAN. The country has not won any medals at the competition and as of 2017 no Vanuatuan athlete has progressed beyond the first round of an event.

== 2009 ==
Vanuatu competed at the 2009 World Championships in Athletics from 15–23 August. A team of 2 athletes was announced in preparation for the competition.

Event	Athletes
Women's 100 metres	Elis Lapenmal
Men's 800 metres	Arnold Sorina

== 2011 ==
Vanuatu competed at the 2011 World Championships in Athletics from August 27 to September 4 in Daegu, South Korea. A team of 2 athletes was announced to represent the country in the event.

Athlete	Event	Preliminaries		Heats		Semifinals		Final	
Athlete	Event	Result	Rank	Result	Rank	Result	Rank	Result	Rank
Arnold Sorina	400 metres			48.76 SB	32	Did not advance			
Susan Tama	100 metres	13.29 (PB)	26	Did not advance					

== 2013 ==
Vanuatu competed at the 2013 World Championships in Athletics in Moscow, Russia, from 10–18 August 2013. A team of one athlete was announced to represent the country in the event.

Athlete	Event	Preliminaries		Heats		Semifinals		Final	
Athlete	Event	Time	Rank	Time	Rank	Time	Rank	Time	Rank
Daniel Philimon	100 metres	11.53	23	did not advance					

== 2015 ==
Vanuatu competed at the 2015 World Championships in Athletics in Beijing, China, from 22–30 August 2015.

Athlete	Event	Preliminary Round		Heat		Semifinal		Final	
Athlete	Event	Result	Rank	Result	Rank	Result	Rank	Result	Rank
Womel Brandy Mento	100 metres	11.17 PB	18	did not advance					

== 2017 ==
Vanuatu will compete at the 2017 World Championships in Athletics in London, Great Britain, from 4–13 August 2017.

Athlete	Event	Heat		Semifinal		Final	
Athlete	Event	Result	Rank	Result	Rank	Result	Rank
Paul Nalau	200 metres	DQ	–	Did not advance			

== 2019 ==
Vanuatu will compete at the 2019 World Championships in Athletics in Doha, Qatar, from 27 September 2019.

Athlete	Event	Heat		Semifinal		Final	
Athlete	Event	Result	Rank	Result	Rank	Result	Rank
Tikie Terry Mael	400 metres		–	Did not advance			
