= Vanuatu at the 2023 World Athletics Championships =

- Flag of Vanuatu
- WA code: VAN

in Budapest, Hungary 19 August 2023 – 27 August 2023
- Competitors: 1 (0 men and 1 woman)
- Medals: Gold 0 Silver 0 Bronze 0 Total 0

World Athletics Championships appearances (overview)
- 1983; 1987; 1991; 1993; 1995; 1997; 1999; 2001; 2003; 2005; 2007; 2009; 2011; 2013; 2015; 2017; 2019; 2022; 2023

Vanuatu competed at the 2023 World Athletics Championships in Budapest, Hungary, which were held from 19 to 27 August 2023. The athlete delegation of the country was composed of one competitor, sprinter Chloe David who would compete in the women's 100 metres. She qualified upon being selected by Athletics Vanuatu. In the heats, David placed seventh out of the eight competitors that competed in her heat and did not advance to the semifinals of the event.

== Background ==
The 2023 World Athletics Championships in Budapest, Hungary, were held from 19 to 27 August 2023. The Championships were held at the National Athletics Centre. To qualify for the World Championships, athletes had to reach an entry standard (e.g. time or distance), place in a specific position at select competitions, be a wild card entry, or qualify through their World Athletics Ranking at the end of the qualification period.

As Vanuatu did not meet any of the four standards, they could send either one male or one female athlete in one event of the Championships who has not yet qualified. Athletics Vanuatu selected sprinter Chloe David who held a personal best of 12.60 seconds in the 100 metres at the time of her selection for the Championships.

== Results ==
Key

- Q = Qualified for the next round
- q = Qualified for the next round as a fastest loser or, in field events, by position without achieving the qualifying target
- NR = National record
- PB = Personal best
- SB = Season best
- N/A = Round not applicable for the event

=== Women ===
David competed in the heats of the women's 100 metres on 20 August against seven other competitors in her heat. She raced in the second heat and recorded a time of 12.88 seconds. There, she placed seventh, placing above Yunisleidy García who had been disqualified, and did not advance further to the semifinals.

Track and road events

Athlete	Event	Heat		Semifinal		Final	
Athlete	Event	Result	Rank	Result	Rank	Result	Rank
Chloe David	100 metres	12.88	7	Did not advance			
