= Draževo =

Draževo may refer to:

- Draževo, Novo Selo, North Macedonia
- Draževo (Bela Palanka), Serbia
