= Pandev =

Pandev (Macedonian: Пандев) is a Macedonian surname, it may refer to:

- Goran Pandev (born 1983), former Macedonian football player
- Riste Pandev (born 1991), Macedonian sprinter
- Saško Pandev (born 1987), Macedonian footballer playing for FK Turnovo
