= Mokrievo =

Mokrievo Мокриево
- Village
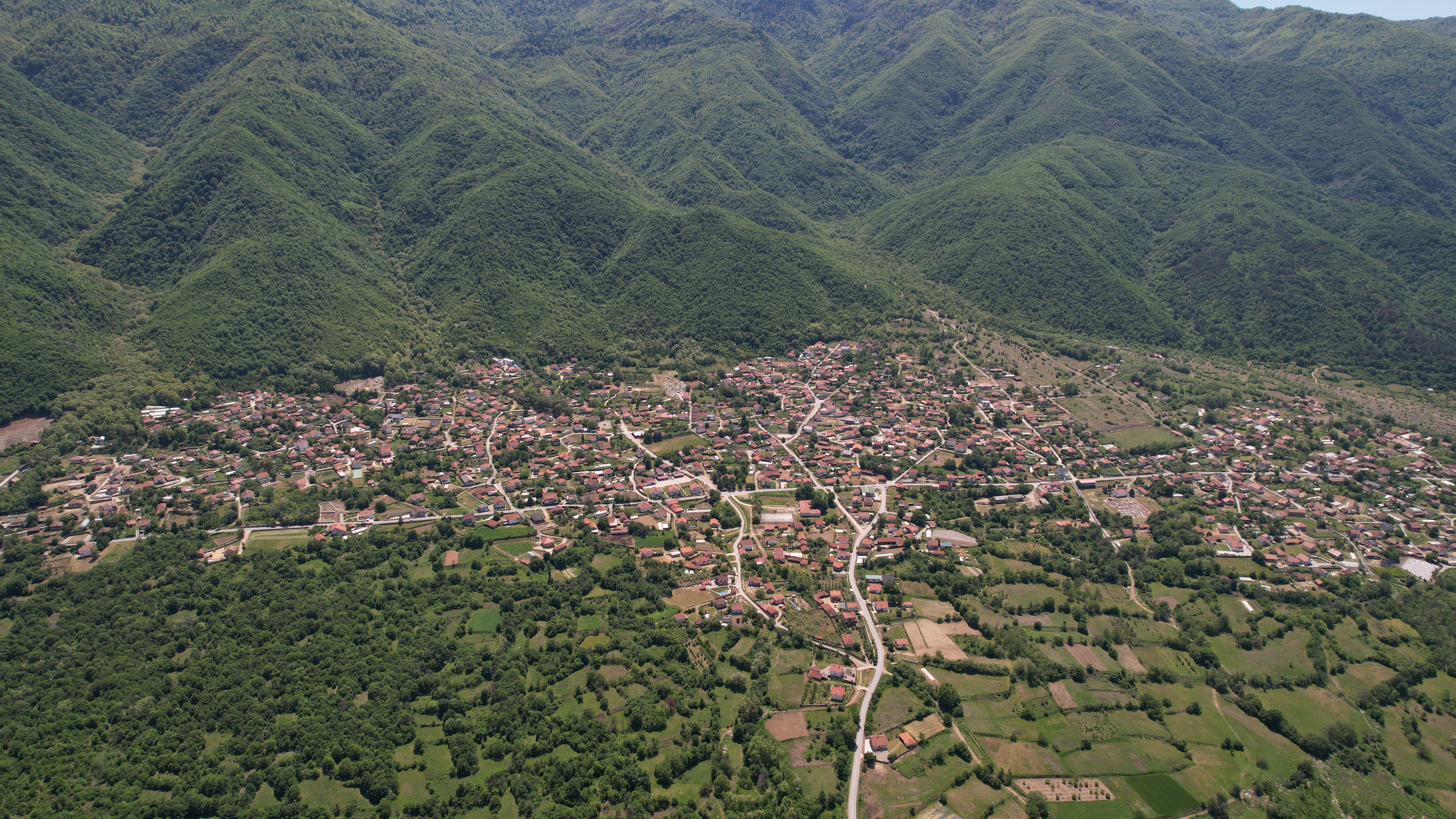
- Air view of the village

- Location within North Macedonia
- Coordinates: 41.375589°N 22.838104°E
- Country: North Macedonia
- Region: Southeastern
- Municipality: Novo Selo

Population (2002)
  - Total: 1,211
- Time zone: UTC+1 (CET)
  - Summer (DST): UTC+2 (CEST)
- Website: .

Mokrievo (Macedonian: Мокриево) is a village in the municipality of Novo Selo, North Macedonia. It is located close to the Greek and Bulgarian borders.

== Demographics ==
According to the 2002 census, the village had a total of 1,211 inhabitants. Ethnic groups in the village include:

- Macedonians 1,204
- Serbs 3
- Others 4

As of 2021, the village of Mokrievo has 678 inhabitants and the ethnic composition was the following:

- Macedonians – 625
- others – 1
- Person without Data - 51
