= Staro Konjarevo =

Staro Konjarevo Старо Коњарево
- Village
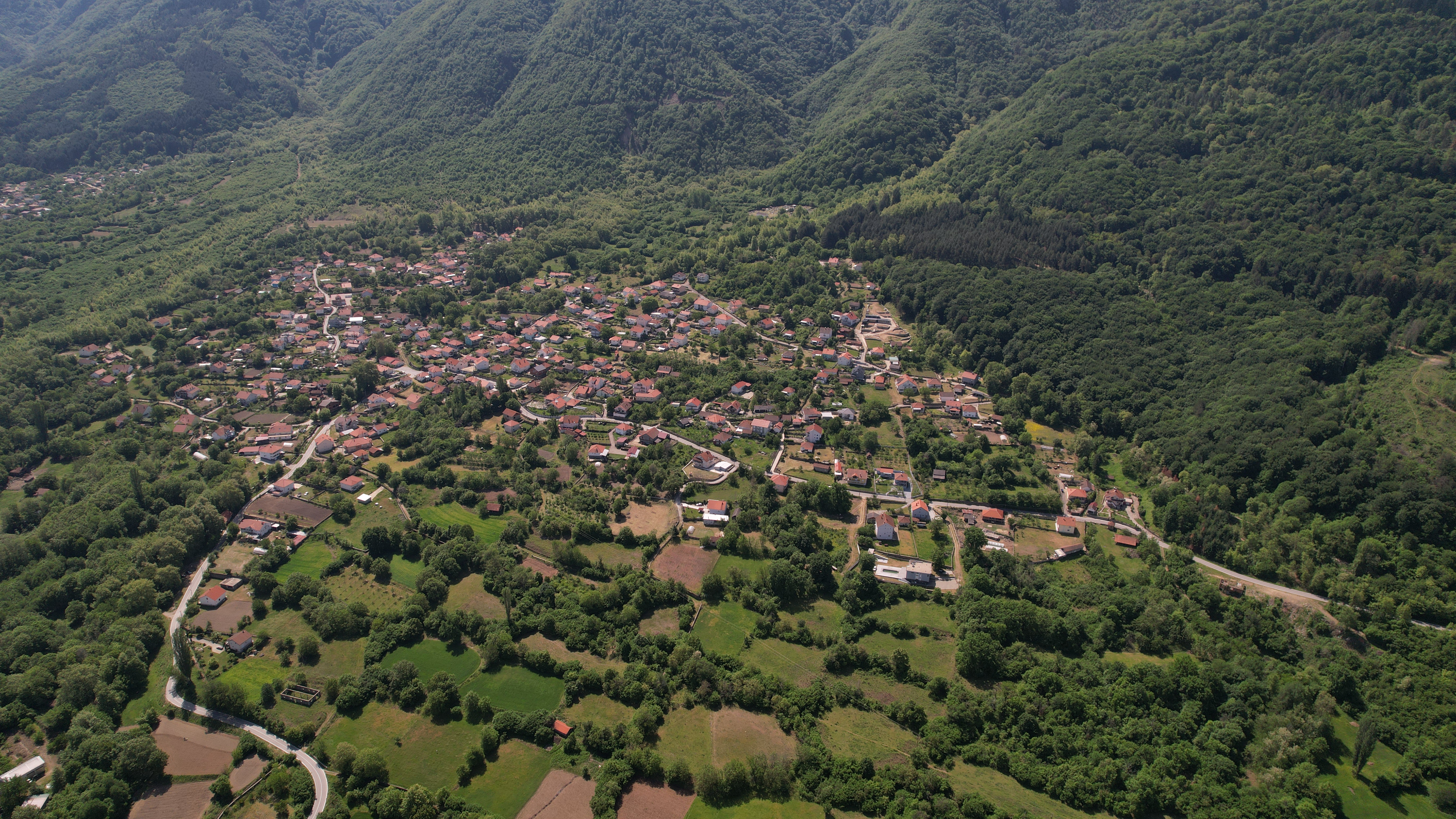
- Air view of the village

- Location within North Macedonia
- Coordinates: 41.438519°N 22.837553°E
- Country: North Macedonia
- Region: Southeastern
- Municipality: Novo Selo

Population (2002)
  - Total: 611
- Time zone: UTC+1 (CET)
  - Summer (DST): UTC+2 (CEST)
- Website: .

Staro Konjarevo (Macedonian: Старо Коњарево) is a village in North Macedonia. It is located close to the Bulgarian border in the Southeastern Region under the Municipality of Novo Selo.

== Demographics ==
According to the 2002 census, the village had a total of 611 inhabitants. Ethnic groups in the village include:

- Macedonians 611

As of 2021, the village of Staro Konjarevo has 300 inhabitants and the ethnic composition was the following:

- Macedonians – 269
- Person without Data – 31
