= Zubovo, Novo Selo =

Zubovo Зубово
- Village
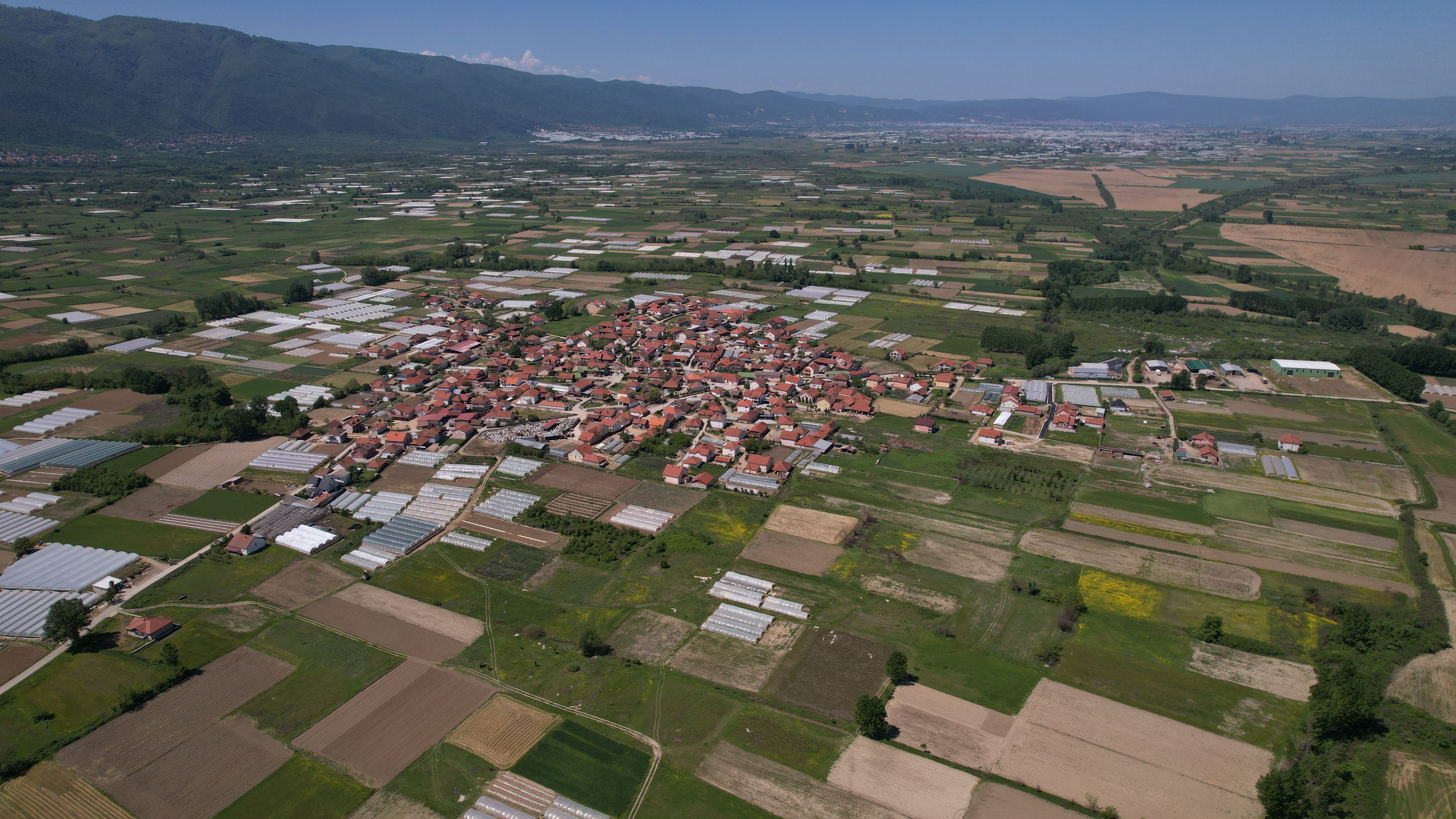
- Air view of the village

- Location within North Macedonia
- Coordinates: 41.409336°N 22.838977°E
- Country: North Macedonia
- Region: Southeastern
- Municipality: Novo Selo

Population (2002)
  - Total: 646
- Time zone: UTC+1 (CET)
  - Summer (DST): UTC+2 (CEST)
- Website: .

Zubovo (Macedonian: Зубово) is a village in the municipality of Novo Selo, North Macedonia.

== Demographics ==
According to the 2002 census, the village had a total of 648 inhabitants. Ethnic groups in the village include:

- Macedonians 646
- Others 2

As of 2021, the village of Zubovo has 447 inhabitants and the ethnic composition was the following:

- Macedonians – 428
- Person without Data - 19
