= Mahamat Goubaye Youssouf =

Chadian sprinter

Personal information
- Born: 27 July 1998 (age 27)

Sport
- Country: Chad
- Sport: Track and field
- Event: sprinter
- Updated on 29 August 2015

Mahamat Goubaye Youssouf (born 27 July 1998) is a male Chadian sprinter. He competed in the 100 metres event at the 2015 World Championships in Athletics in Beijing, China.

== See also ==
- Chad at the 2015 World Championships in Athletics
