= Vanuatu at the 1983 World Championships in Athletics =

- Flag of Vanuatu
- WA code: VAN

in Helsinki, Finland August 7–14, 1983
- Competitors: 2 (1 man and 1 woman) in 4 events
- Medals: Gold 0 Silver 0 Bronze 0 Total 0

World Championships in Athletics appearances
- 1983; 1987; 1991; 1993; 1995; 1997; 1999; 2001; 2003; 2005; 2007; 2009; 2011; 2013; 2015; 2017; 2019; 2022; 2023; 2025

Vanuatu competed at the 1983 World Championships in Athletics in Helsinki, Finland, which were held from 7 to 14 August 1983. The athlete delegation consisted of two athletes, sprinter Georges Taniel and thrower Maryline Adam. Both of the athletes competed in two events but failed to advance past the preliminary rounds for their events.

== Background ==
The 1983 World Championships in Athletics were held at the Helsinki Olympic Stadium in Helsinki, Finland. Under the auspices of the International Amateur Athletics Federation, this was the first edition of the World Championships. It was held from 7 to 14 August 1983 and had 41 different events. Among the competing teams was the nation of Vanuatu. For this edition of the World Championships in Athletics, sprinter Georges Taniel and thrower Maryline Adam competed.

== Men ==
Taniel first competed in the fifth qualifying heat of the men's 100 metres on 7 August against six other sprinters. There, he recorded a time of 11.02 seconds, placed sixth, and failed to advance further to the quarterfinals after not placing within the top three of his heat or being one of the next five fastest athletes. Six days later, he competed in the eighth qualifying heat of the men's 200 metres against six other sprinters. There, he recorded a time of 22.28 seconds and again placed sixth, failing to advance further to the quarterfinals after not placing within the top three of his heat or being one of the next eight fastest athletes.

Track and road events

Athlete	Event	Heat		Quarterfinal		Semifinal		Final	
Athlete	Event	Result	Rank	Result	Rank	Result	Rank	Result	Rank
Georges Taniel	100 metres	11.02	52	Did not advance					
Georges Taniel	200 metres	22.28	39	Did not advance					

== Women ==
Adam first competed in the qualifications for the women's shot put in Group A against nine other athletes. There, she recorded her farthest throw of 11.32 metres which placed her ninth in her group and 19th overall, failing to advance further as only the top 12 would be chosen to do so. Her placement remains as Vanuatu's best placing for a female athlete at any edition of the Championships. She then competed in the qualifications for the women's discus throw in Group A. There, she recorded her farthest throw of 33.36 metres which placed her tenth in her group and last overall, failing to advance further.

Field events

Athlete	Event	Qualification		Final	
Athlete	Event	Distance	Position	Distance	Position
Maryline Adam	Shot put	11.32	19	Did not advance	
Maryline Adam	Discus throw	33.36	20	Did not advance	
