= Samoilovo =

Samoilovo Самуилово
- Village
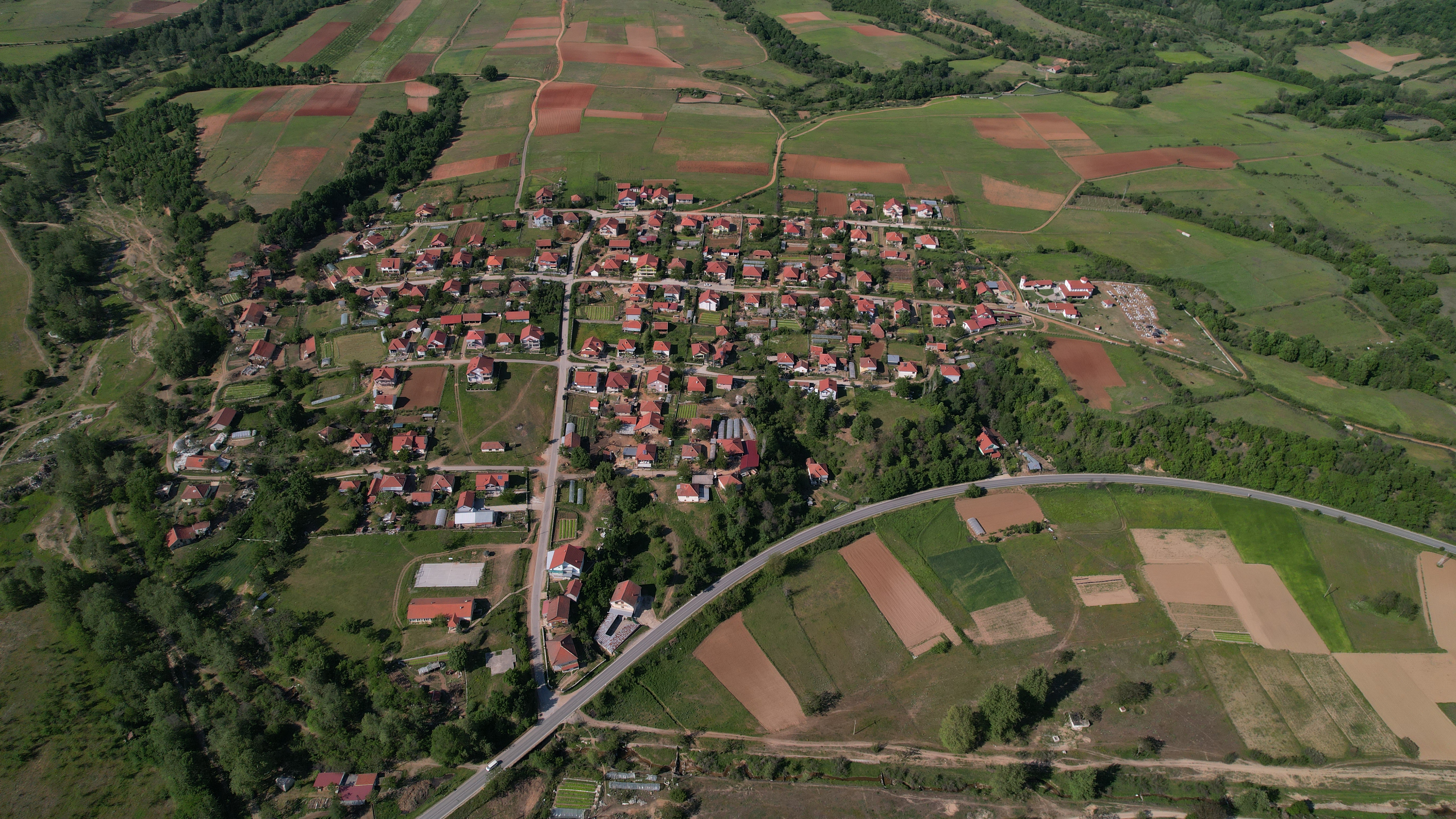
- Air view of the village

- Location within North Macedonia
- Coordinates: 41.403211°N 22.904795°E
- Country: North Macedonia
- Region: Southeastern
- Municipality: Novo Selo

Population (2021)
  - Total: 235
- Time zone: UTC+1 (CET)
  - Summer (DST): UTC+2 (CEST)
- Website: .

Samoilovo (Macedonian: Самуилово) is a village in the municipality of Novo Selo, North Macedonia.

== Demographics ==
According to the 2002 census, the village had a total of 348 inhabitants. Ethnic groups in the village include:

- Macedonians 345
- Serbs 2
- Others 1

As of 2021, the village of Samoilovo has 235 inhabitants and the ethnic composition was the following:

- Macedonians – 218
- Serbs – 1
- Person without Data - 16
