= 2018 Melanesian Championships in Athletics =

VII Melanesian Championships in Athletics
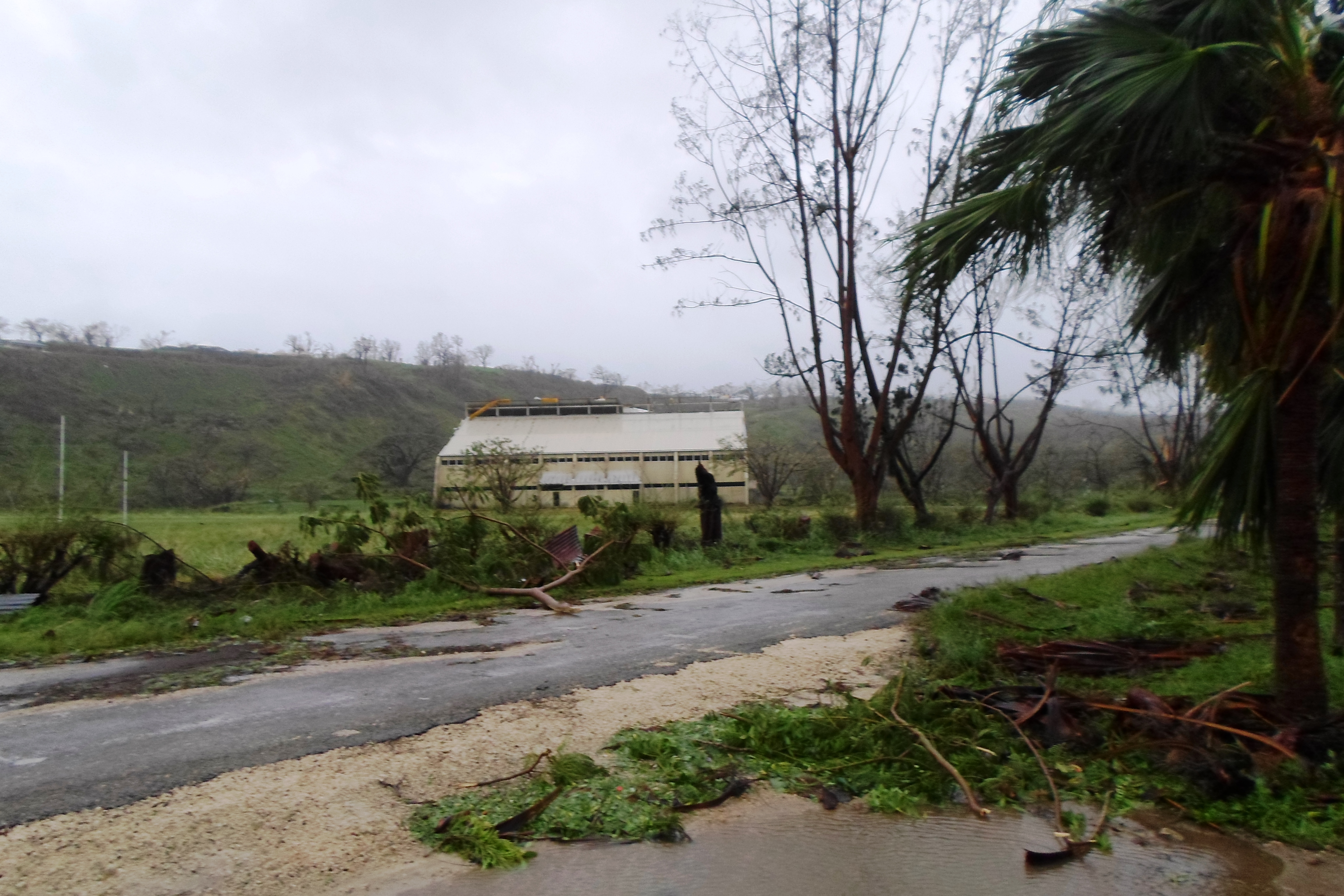
- Dates: 9-11 May
- Host city: Port Vila, Vanuatu
- Venue: Korman Stadium
- Level: Senior

The 2018 Melanesian Championships in Athletics took place on 9–11 May 2018. The event was held at the Korman Stadium in Port Vila, Vanuatu.

The U18 championships doubled as the official trial for the 2018 Summer Youth Olympics. In the senior men's 100 m, Anas Abu-Ganaba started the final conservatively, making up over a metre of distance over the last 40 metres to win the gold medal.

== Medal summary ==
=== Men ===
Event	Gold		Silver		Bronze	
100 metres (-1.1 m/s)	Anas Abu-Ganaba; Australia	10.69	Tikie Terry Mael; Vanuatu	10.73	Brandym Mento; Vanuatu	11.06
200 metres (-1.1 m/s)	Anas Abu-Ganaba; Australia	21.27	Tikie Terry Mael; Vanuatu	21.59	Brandym Mento; Vanuatu	22.02
400 metres	Jordan Sarmento; Australia	47.22	Bradly Toa; Vanuatu	49.10	Jackfrey Tamathui; Vanuatu	50.98

=== Women ===
Event	Gold		Silver		Bronze	
100 metres (-1.2 m/s)	Heleina Young; Fiji	12.03	Nicole Kay; Australia	12.31	Roselyne Nalin; Vanuatu	12.75
200 metres (-1.3 m/s)	Nicole Kay; Australia	24.50	Heleina Young; Fiji	24.77	Natasha Rudder; Australia	26.20
400 metres	Valentine Hello; Vanuatu	58.94	Fane Sauvakacolo; Fiji	1:00.19	Roselyne Nalin; Vanuatu	1:00.38
