= 2015 World Championships in Athletics – Men's 100 metres =

Men's 100 metres at the 2015 World Championships
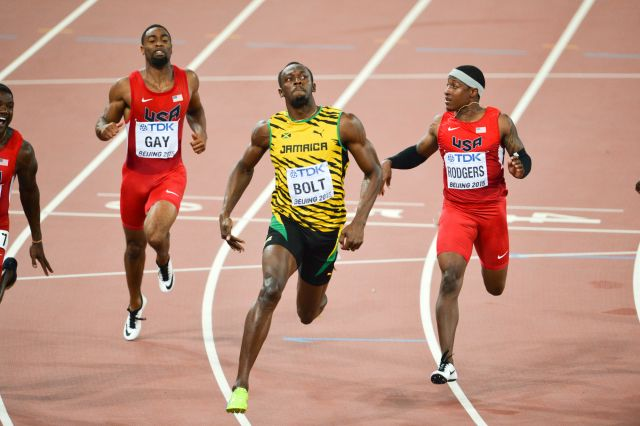
- 100 m final moment
- Venue: Beijing National Stadium
- Dates: 22 August (preliminary round & heats); 23 August (semifinal & final)
- Competitors: 69 from 51 nations
- Winning time: 9.79

Medalists
| gold medal | Usain Bolt | Jamaica |
| silver medal | Justin Gatlin | United States |
| bronze medal | Trayvon Bromell | United States |
| bronze medal | Andre De Grasse | Canada |

Video on YouTube Official Video

The men's 100 metres at the 2015 World Championships in Athletics was held at the Beijing National Stadium on 22 and 23 August.

For only the second time in the World Athletics Championships, the winning margin in the men's 100 metres was 0.01 seconds. The first time this happened was in 2003.

== Summary ==
Justin Gatlin had the world leading time in 2015. Gatlin ran 9.83 s in the heats and 9.77 s in the semi-final. Reigning champion Usain Bolt ran times of 9.96 s in both rounds. Jimmy Vicaut and Su Bingtian qualified for the final with tied fastest loser times of 9.986 s, so there were 9 competitors in the final.

In the final, Bolt finished one hundredth of a second ahead of Gatlin in a time of 9.79 s. There was a tie for third place, with Andre De Grasse and Trayvon Bromell both finishing in 9.911 s, and two bronze medals were awarded.

At 39 years, 139 days old, Kim Collins became the oldest ever competitor for the men's 100 m.

== Records ==
Prior to the competition, the records were as follows:

| World record | Usain Bolt (JAM) | 9.58 | Berlin, Germany | 16 August 2009 |
| Championship record | Usain Bolt (JAM) | 9.58 | Berlin, Germany | 16 August 2009 |
| World Leading | Justin Gatlin (USA) | 9.74 | Doha, Qatar | 15 May 2015 |
| African Record | Olusoji Fasuba (NGR) | 9.85 | Doha, Qatar | 12 May 2006 |
| Asian Record | Femi Ogunode (QAT) | 9.91 | Wuhan, China | 4 June 2015 |
| North, Central American and Caribbean record | Usain Bolt (JAM) | 9.58 | Berlin, Germany | 16 August 2009 |
| South American Record | Robson da Silva (BRA) | 10.00A | Mexico City, Mexico | 22 July 1988 |
| European Record | Francis Obikwelu (POR) | 9.86 | Athens, Greece | 22 August 2004 |
| European Record | Jimmy Vicaut (FRA) | 9.86 | Saint-Denis, France | 4 July 2015 |
| Oceanian record | Patrick Johnson (AUS) | 9.93 | Mito, Japan | 5 May 2003 |

== Qualification standards ==
Entry standards
10.16

== Schedule ==
| Date | Time | Round |
|---|---|---|
| 22 August 2015 | 12:40 | Preliminary round |
| 22 August 2015 | 19:20 | Heats |
| 23 August 2015 | 19:10 | Semifinals |
| 23 August 2015 | 21:15 | Final |

All times are local times (UTC+8)

== Results ==
=== Preliminary round ===
Qualification: Best 3 (Q) and next 3 fastest (q) qualify for the next round.

Wind:

Heat 1: -0.8 m/s, Heat 2: -0.3 m/s, Heat 3: -0.6 m/s

| Rank | Heat | Name | Nationality | Time | Notes |
|---|---|---|---|---|---|
| 1 | 2 | Barakat Al-Harthi | Oman | 10.31 | Q |
| 2 | 1 | Banuve Tabakaucoro | Fiji | 10.50 | Q |
| 3 | 3 | Jeffrey Vanan | Suriname | 10.55 | Q |
| 4 | 1 | Hassan Saaid | Maldives | 10.56 | Q |
| 5 | 3 | Holder da Silva | Guinea-Bissau | 10.58 | Q, SB |
| 6 | 2 | Rodman Teltull | Palau | 10.71 | Q, NR |
| 7 | 1 | Mohamed Fakhri Ismail | Brunei | 10.73 | Q |
| 8 | 3 | Yendountien Tiebekabe | Togo | 10.76 | Q |
| 9 | 1 | Mark Anderson | Belize | 10.84 | q |
| 10 | 3 | Yaspi Boby | Indonesia | 10.85 | q |
| 11 | 3 | Mahamat Goubaye Youssouf | Chad | 10.92 | q, PB |
| 12 | 2 | Riste Pandev | Macedonia | 10.94 | Q |
| 13 | 1 | João de Barros | São Tomé and Príncipe | 11.07 | |
| 14 | 1 | La Shondra David Mosa'ati | Tonga | 11.08 | PB |
| 15 | 3 | Rossene Mpingo | DR Congo | 11.10 | PB |
| 16 | 1 | Mohamed Lamine Dansoko | Guinea | 11.11 | PB |
| 17 | 3 | Masbah Ahmmed | Bangladesh | 11.13 | SB |
| 18 | 2 | Womel Brandy Mento | Vanuatu | 11.17 | PB |
| 19 | 2 | Grégory Bradai | French Polynesia | 11.29 | PB |
| 20 | 3 | Jidou El Moctar | Mauritania | 11.30 | PB |
| 21 | 1 | Leong Wang Kuong | Macau | 11.31 | SB |
| 22 | 3 | Claytus Taqimama | Solomon Islands | 11.58 | PB |
| 23 | 2 | Etimoni Timuani | Tuvalu | 11.72 | PB |
| 24 | 1 | Dagiero Dagiero | Nauru | 11.81 | PB |
| 25 | 2 | Kimwaua Makin | Kiribati | 11.98 | SB |
| 26 | 2 | Tashi Dendup | Bhutan | 12.15 | NR |
| | 2 | Béranger-Aymard Bossé | Central African Republic | DQ | |

=== Heats ===
Qualification: Best 3 (Q) and next 3 fastest (q) qualify for the next round.

Wind:

Heat 1: −0.1 m/s, Heat 2: −1.4 m/s, Heat 3: −0.3 m/s, Heat 4: +0.5 m/s, Heat 5: +0.3 m/s, Heat 6: +2.1 m/s, Heat 7: −0.2 m/s

| Rank | Heat | Name | Nationality | Time | Notes |
|---|---|---|---|---|---|
| 1 | 6 | Justin Gatlin | United States | 9.83w | Q |
| 2 | 4 | Trayvon Bromell | United States | 9.91 | Q |
| 3 | 5 | Jimmy Vicaut | France | 9.92 | Q |
| 4 | 1 | Asafa Powell | Jamaica | 9.95 | Q |
| 5 | 7 | Usain Bolt | Jamaica | 9.96 | Q |
| 6 | 7 | Mike Rodgers | United States | 9.97 | Q |
| 7 | 5 | Andre De Grasse | Canada | 9.99 | Q |
| 8 | 3 | Femi Ogunode | Qatar | 9.99 | Q |
| 9 | 3 | Ramon Gittens | Barbados | 10.02 | Q, PB |
| 10 | 1 | Su Bingtian | China | 10.03 | Q |
| 11 | 6 | Aaron Brown | Canada | 10.03w | Q |
| 12 | 5 | Jak Ali Harvey | Turkey | 10.04 | Q |
| 13 | 4 | Chijindu Ujah | Great Britain & N.I. | 10.05 | Q |
| 14 | 3 | Ben Youssef Meïté | Ivory Coast | 10.05 | Q, =NR |
| 15 | 7 | Churandy Martina | Netherlands | 10.06 | Q, SB |
| 16 | 6 | Henricho Bruintjies | South Africa | 10.07w | Q |
| 17 | 1 | Akani Simbine | South Africa | 10.09 | Q |
| 18 | 6 | Hassan Taftian | Iran | 10.10w | q |
| 19 | 2 | Tyson Gay | United States | 10.11 | Q |
| 20 | 3 | Richard Kilty | Great Britain & N.I. | 10.12 | q |
| 21 | 7 | Levi Cadogan | Barbados | 10.12 | q |
| 22 | 3 | Zhang Peimeng | China | 10.13 | SB |
| 23 | 5 | James Dasaolu | Great Britain & N.I. | 10.13 | |
| 24 | 4 | Julian Reus | Germany | 10.14 | Q |
| 25 | 1 | Kei Takase | Japan | 10.15 | |
| 26 | 6 | Kim Collins | Saint Kitts and Nevis | 10.16w | |
| 27 | 2 | Nickel Ashmeade | Jamaica | 10.19 | Q |
| 28 | 7 | Yancarlos Martínez | Dominican Republic | 10.19 | |
| 29 | 1 | Justyn Warner | Canada | 10.20 | |
| 30 | 6 | Aziz Ouhadi | Morocco | 10.22w | |
| 31 | 4 | Antoine Adams | Saint Kitts and Nevis | 10.23 | |
| 32 | 2 | Christophe Lemaitre | France | 10.24 | Q |
| 33 | 4 | Barakat Al-Harthi | Oman | 10.24 | SB |
| 34 | 7 | Reza Ghasemi | Iran | 10.25 | |
| 35 | 5 | Hua Wilfried Koffi | Ivory Coast | 10.29 | |
| 36 | 6 | Yazaldes Nascimento | Portugal | 10.29w | |
| 37 | 2 | Sven Knipphals | Germany | 10.31 | |
| 38 | 2 | Kemar Hyman | Cayman Islands | 10.32 | |
| 39 | 5 | Brijesh Lawrence | Saint Kitts and Nevis | 10.40 | |
| 40 | 1 | Jacques Riparelli | Italy | 10.41 | |
| 41 | 5 | Banuve Tabakaucoro | Fiji | 10.41 | |
| 42 | 7 | Hassan Saaid | Maldives | 10.42 | NR |
| 43 | 1 | Kim Kuk-young | South Korea | 10.48 | |
| 44 | 3 | Jeffrey Vanan | Suriname | 10.57 | |
| 45 | 1 | Yaspi Boby | Indonesia | 10.65 | |
| 46 | 2 | Holder da Silva | Guinea-Bissau | 10.68 | |
| 47 | 2 | Rodman Teltull | Palau | 10.72 | |
| 48 | 7 | Mohamed Fakhri Ismail | Brunei | 10.72 | |
| 49 | 3 | Yendountien Tiebekabe | Togo | 10.74 | |
| 50 | 3 | Keston Bledman | Trinidad and Tobago | 10.75 | |
| 51 | 4 | Mark Anderson | Belize | 10.87 | |
| 52 | 6 | Mahamat Goubaye Youssouf | Chad | 10.92w | |
| 53 | 5 | Riste Pandev | Macedonia | 11.31 | |
| | 2 | Anaso Jobodwana | South Africa | DQ | R 162.7 |
| | 4 | Mosito Lehata | Lesotho | DNS | |
| | 4 | Rondel Sorrillo | Trinidad and Tobago | DNS | |

=== Semifinals ===
Qualification: Best 2 (Q) and next 2 fastest (q) qualify for the final.

Wind:

Heat 1: −0.4 m/s, Heat 2: +0.9 m/s, Heat 3: −0.4 m/s

| Rank | Heat | Name | Nationality | Time | Notes |
|---|---|---|---|---|---|
| 1 | 2 | Justin Gatlin | United States | 9.77 | Q |
| 2 | 2 | Mike Rodgers | United States | 9.86 | Q, SB |
| 3 | 1 | Usain Bolt | Jamaica | 9.96 | Q |
| 3 | 1 | Andre De Grasse | Canada | 9.96 | Q |
| 3 | 3 | Tyson Gay | United States | 9.96 | Q |
| 6 | 3 | Asafa Powell | Jamaica | 9.97 | Q |
| 7 | 3 | Jimmy Vicaut | France | 9.99 | q |
| 7 | 1 | Trayvon Bromell | United States | 9.99 | q |
| 7 | 1 | Su Bingtian | China | 9.99 | q, =NR |
| 10 | 2 | Femi Ogunode | Qatar | 10.00 | |
| 11 | 2 | Akani Simbine | South Africa | 10.02 | |
| 12 | 3 | Ramon Gittens | Barbados | 10.04 | |
| 13 | 2 | Chijindu Ujah | Great Britain & N.I. | 10.05 | |
| 14 | 2 | Nickel Ashmeade | Jamaica | 10.06 | |
| 15 | 1 | Jak Ali Harvey | Turkey | 10.08 | |
| 16 | 3 | Churandy Martina | Netherlands | 10.09 | |
| 17 | 2 | Aaron Brown | Canada | 10.15 | |
| 18 | 3 | Ben Youssef Meïté | Ivory Coast | 10.17 | |
| 19 | 2 | Levi Cadogan | Barbados | 10.19 | |
| 20 | 1 | Christophe Lemaitre | France | 10.20 | |
| 20 | 3 | Hassan Taftian | Iran | 10.20 | |
| 20 | 3 | Richard Kilty | Great Britain & N.I. | 10.20 | |
| 23 | 1 | Henricho Bruintjies | South Africa | 10.21 | |
| 24 | 1 | Julian Reus | Germany | 10.28 | |

=== Final ===
The final was started at 21:15.

Wind: −0.5 m/s

| Rank | Lane | Name | Nationality | Time | Notes |
|---|---|---|---|---|---|
| 1st place, gold medalist(s) | 5 | Usain Bolt | Jamaica | 9.79 | SB |
| 2nd place, silver medalist(s) | 7 | Justin Gatlin | United States | 9.80 | |
| 3rd place, bronze medalist(s) | 3 | Trayvon Bromell | United States | 9.92 | |
| 3rd place, bronze medalist(s) | 9 | Andre De Grasse | Canada | 9.92 | PB |
| 5 | 4 | Mike Rodgers | United States | 9.94 | |
| 6 | 6 | Tyson Gay | United States | 10.00 | |
| 7 | 8 | Asafa Powell | Jamaica | 10.00 | |
| 8 | 1 | Jimmy Vicaut | France | 10.00 | |
| 9 | 2 | Su Bingtian | China | 10.06 | |
