= Smolari =

Smolari Смолари
- Village
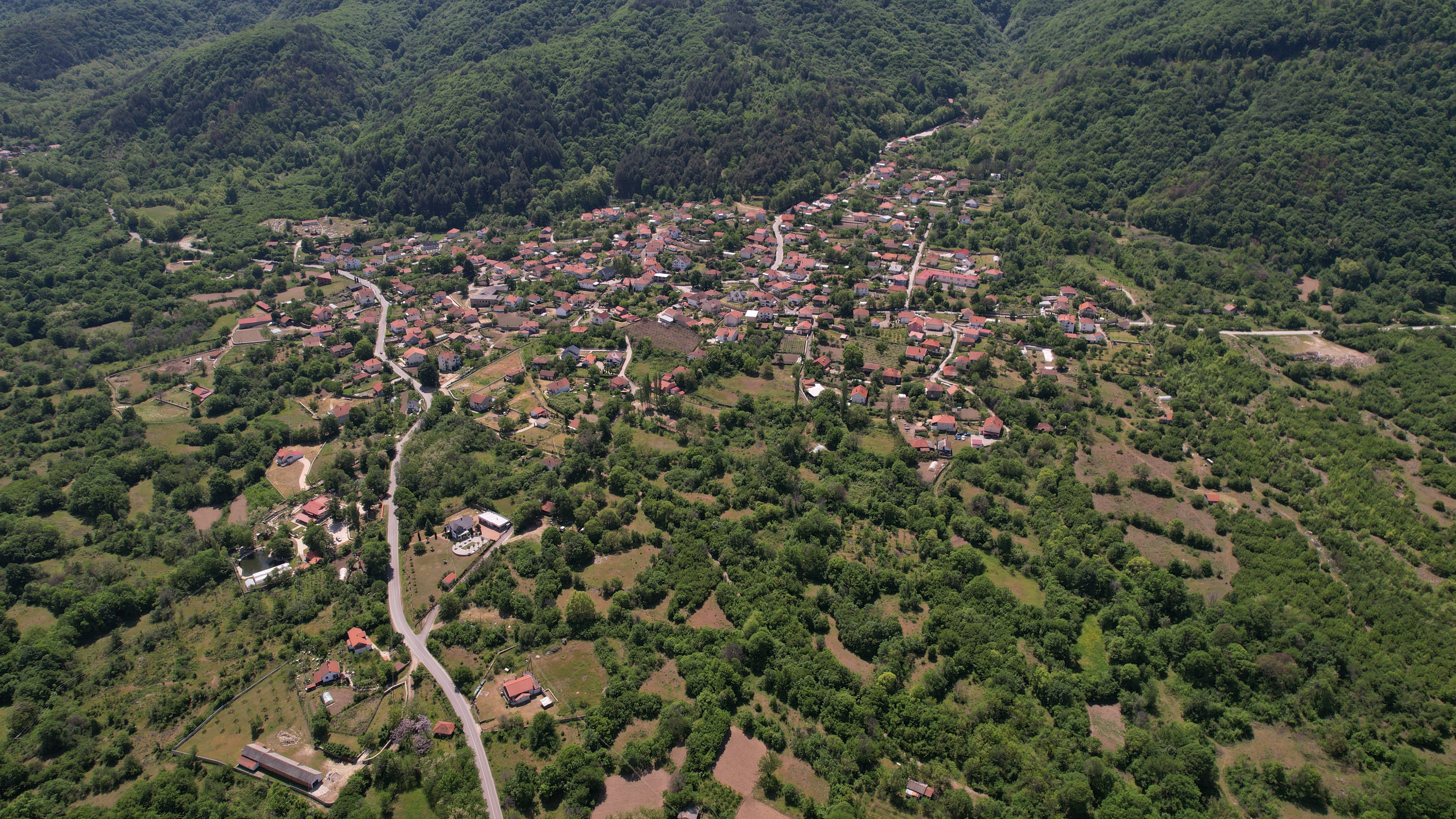
- Air view of the village

- Location within North Macedonia
- Coordinates: 41.376296°N 22.903540°E
- Country: North Macedonia
- Region: Southeastern
- Municipality: Novo Selo

Population (2021)
  - Total: 312
- Time zone: UTC+1 (CET)
  - Summer (DST): UTC+2 (CEST)

Smolari (Macedonian: Смолари) is a village in the municipality of Novo Selo, North Macedonia.

== Demographics ==
According to the 2002 census, the village had a total of 659 inhabitants. Ethnic groups in the village include:

- Macedonians – 659

As of 2021, the village of Smolari has 312 inhabitants and the ethnic composition was the following:

- Macedonians – 290
- Serbs – 1
- Person without Data – 21
