= Borisovo, Novo Selo =

Borisovo Борисово
- Village
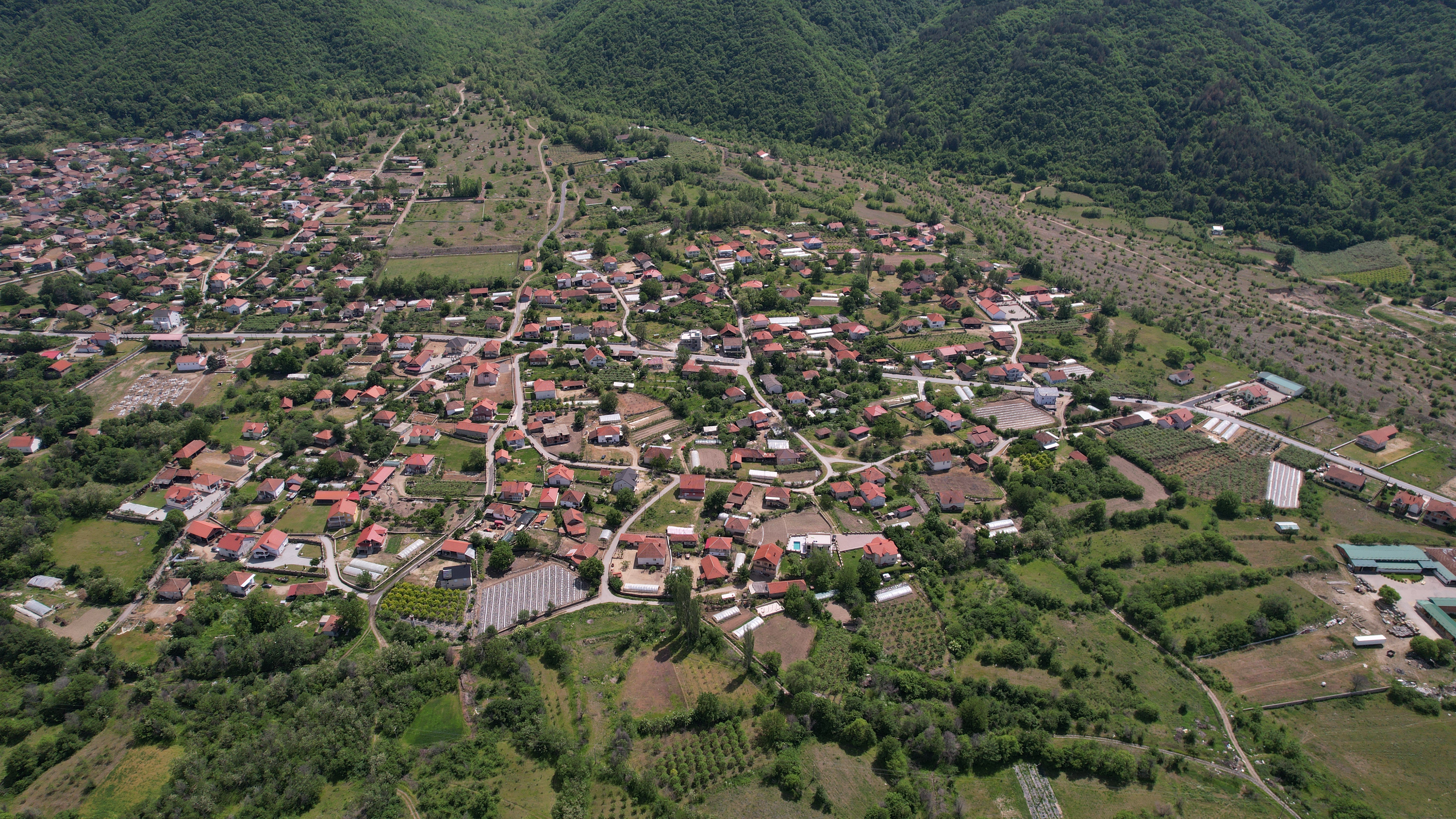
- Air view of the village

- Location within North Macedonia
- Coordinates: 41.378785°N 22.826198°E
- Country: North Macedonia
- Region: Southeastern
- Municipality: Novo Selo

Population (2021)
  - Total: 230
- Time zone: UTC+1 (CET)
  - Summer (DST): UTC+2 (CEST)
- Website: .

Borisovo (Macedonian: Борисово) is a village in the municipality of Novo Selo, North Macedonia.

== Demographics ==
According to the 2002 census, the village had a total of 409 inhabitants. Ethnic groups in the village include:

- Macedonians 408
- Serbs 1

As of 2021, the village of Borisovo has 230 inhabitants and the ethnic composition was the following:

- Macedonians – 213
- Person without Data - 17
