= Mokrino =

Mokrino Мокрино
- Village
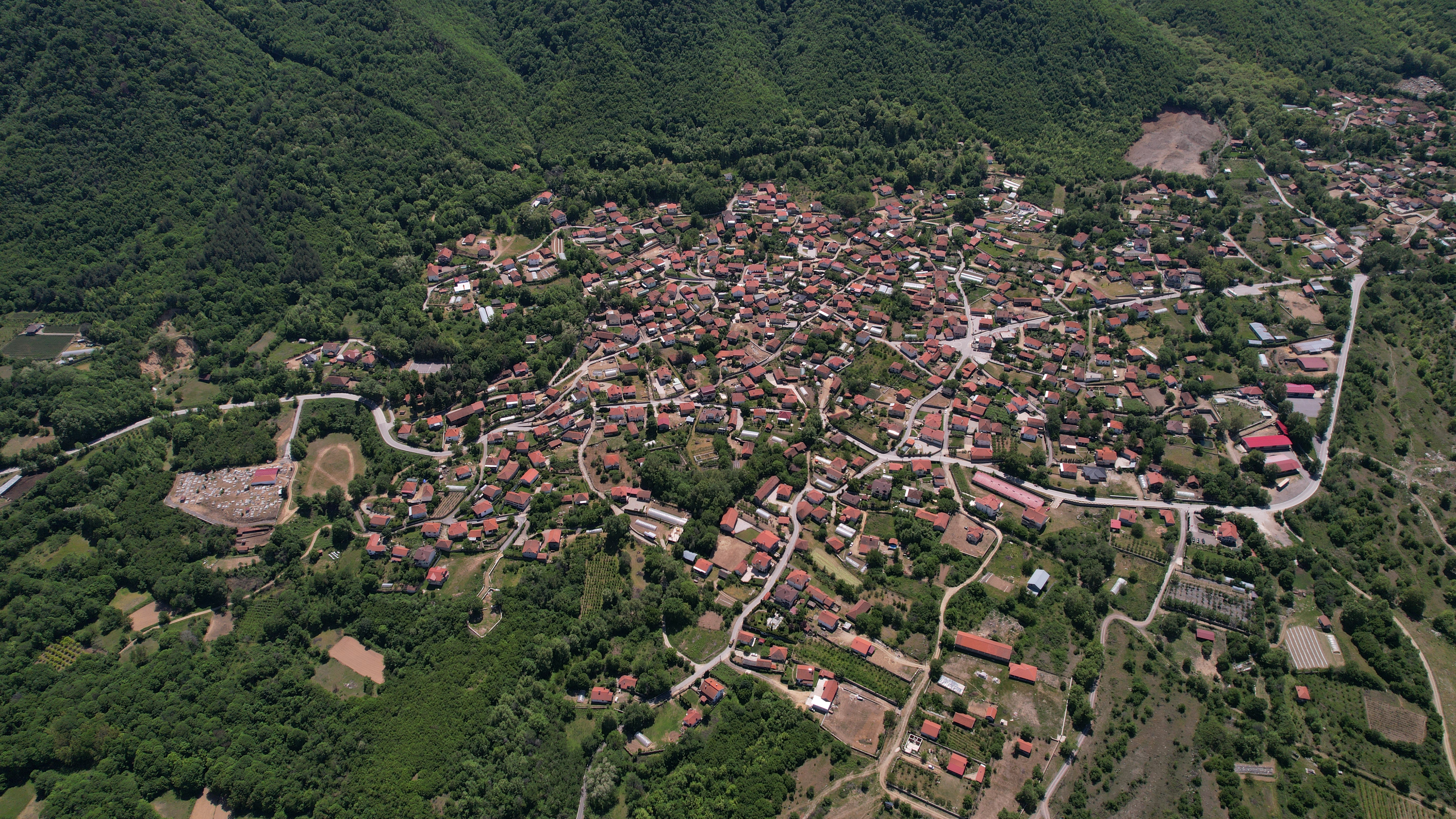
- Air view of the village

- Location within North Macedonia
- Coordinates: 41.377559°N 22.855098°E
- Country: North Macedonia
- Region: Southeastern
- Municipality: Novo Selo

Population (2021)
  - Total: 449
- Time zone: UTC+1 (CET)
  - Summer (DST): UTC+2 (CEST)

Mokrino (Macedonian: Мокрино) is a village in the municipality of Novo Selo, North Macedonia. It is located close to the Greek and Bulgarian borders.

== Demographics ==
According to the 2002 census, the village had a total of 748 inhabitants. Ethnic groups in the village include:

- Macedonians 747
- Others 1

As of 2021, the village of Mokrino has 449 inhabitants and the ethnic composition was the following:

- Macedonians – 417
- Person without Data - 32
