= Oman at the 2022 World Athletics Championships =

- WA code: OMA
- National federation: OAA

in Eugene, United States 15–24 July 2022
- Competitors: 1 (1 man and 0 women)

World Athletics Championships appearances
- 1983; 1987; 1991; 1993; 1995; 1997; 1999; 2001; 2003; 2005–2007; 2009; 2011; 2013; 2015; 2017; 2019; 2022; 2023

Oman competed at the 2022 World Athletics Championships in Eugene, United States, from 15 to 24 July 2022. It entered one athlete.

== Results ==
=== Men ===
Field events

Athlete	Event	Qualification		Final	
Athlete	Event	Distance	Position	Distance	Position
Salim Saleh Mus Al Yarabi	Long Jump	7.43	28	Did not qualify	
