= Macedonia at the 2011 World Championships in Athletics =

- WA code: MKD
- National federation: Atletska Federacija na Makedonija
- Website: www.afm.org.mk

in Daegu
- Competitors: 1
- Medals: Gold 0 Silver 0 Bronze 0 Total 0

World Championships in Athletics appearances
- 1995; 1997; 1999; 2001; 2003; 2005; 2007; 2009; 2011; 2013; 2015; 2017; 2019; 2022; 2023

Other related appearances
- Yugoslavia (1983–1991)

The Republic of Macedonia competed at the 2011 World Championships in Athletics from August 27 to September 4 in Daegu, South Korea. One athlete was announced to represent the country in the event.

== Results ==
=== Women ===
Athlete	Event	Preliminaries		Heats		Semifinals		Final	
Athlete	Event	Time Width Height	Rank	Time Width Height	Rank	Time Width Height	Rank	Time Width Height	Rank
Ivana Rožhman	100 metres	12.48 q	14	12.42	50	Did not advance			
