= Macedonia at the 2017 World Championships in Athletics =

- WA code: MKD

in London
- Competitors: 1 (1 woman) in 1 event
- Medals: Gold 0 Silver 0 Bronze 0 Total 0

World Championships in Athletics appearances
- 1995; 1997; 1999; 2001; 2003; 2005; 2007; 2009; 2011; 2013; 2015; 2017; 2019; 2022; 2023

Other related appearances
- Yugoslavia (1983–1991)

Macedonia competed at the 2017 World Championships in Athletics in London, United Kingdom, from 4–13 August 2017.

== Results ==
(q – qualified, NM – no mark, SB – season best)

=== Women ===
Track and road events

Athlete	Event	Heat		Semifinal		Final	
Athlete	Event	Result	Rank	Result	Rank	Result	Rank
Drita Islami	400 metres hurdles	1:00.38	38	Did not advance			
