= Womel Brandy Mento =

Vanuatuan sprinter

Personal information
- Born: 17 July 1997 (age 28)

Sport
- Country: Vanuatu
- Sport: Track and field
- Event: sprinter
- Updated on 29 August 2015

Womel Brandy Mento (born 17 July 1997) is a male Vanuatuan sprinter. He competed in the 100 metres event at the 2015 World Championships in Athletics in Beijing, China.

Mento also competed at the 2018 Melanesian Championships in Athletics in both the 100 m and 200 m. At the championships, he won bronze medals in both events.

== See also ==
- Vanuatu at the 2015 World Championships in Athletics
