= North Macedonia at the 2019 World Athletics Championships =

North Macedonia at the 2019 World Championships in Athletics
- WA code: MKD

in Doha
- Competitors: 1 (1 man) in 1 event
- Medals: Gold 0 Silver 0 Bronze 0 Total 0

World Championships in Athletics appearances
- 1995; 1997; 1999; 2001; 2003; 2005; 2007; 2009; 2011; 2013; 2015; 2017; 2019; 2022; 2023

Other related appearances
- Yugoslavia (1983–1991)

North Macedonia competed at the 2019 World Championships in Athletics in Doha, Qatar, starting on 27 September 2019.

== Results ==
(q – qualified, NM – no mark, SB – season best)

=== Men ===
Track and road events

Athlete	Event	Heat		Semifinal		Final	
Athlete	Event	Result	Rank	Result	Rank	Result	Rank
Jovan Stojoski	400 metres	47.92	38	Did not advance			
