= Novo Selo Municipality =

Municipality of North Macedonia

Coordinates: 41.42°N 22.87°E

Municipality of Novo Selo Општина Ново Село
- Municipality
- Flag Coat of arms

- Country: North Macedonia
- Region: Southeastern
- Municipal seat: Novo Selo

Government
  - Mayor: Ǵorǵe Božinov (VMRO-DPMNE)

Area
  - Total: 424.82 km^{2} (164.02 sq mi)

Population
  - Total: 6,972
  - Density: 16.41/km^{2} (42.51/sq mi)
- Time zone: UTC+1 (CET)
- Postal code: 2434
- Area code: 034
- Vehicle registration: SR
- Website: http://www.novoselo.gov.mk

Novo Selo (Macedonian: Ново Село) is a municipality in eastern North Macedonia. Novo Selo is also the name of the village where the municipal seat is found. Novo Selo means "New Village" in Macedonian and other Slavic languages. Novo Selo Municipality is part of the Southeastern statistical region.

== Demographics ==
According to the 2021 North Macedonia census, this municipality has 6,972 inhabitants. Ethnic groups in the municipality include:

	2002		2021	
	Number	%	Number	%
TOTAL	11,567	100	6,972	100
Macedonians	11,509	99.5	6,380	91.51
Serbs	25	0.22	6	0.09
Albanians			5	0.07
Roma	3	0.03		
Bosniaks	2	0.02		
Other / Undeclared / Unknown	28	0.23	14	0.2
Persons for whom data are taken from administrative sources			567	8.13

== Inhabited places ==
- Novo Selo (seat)
- Badilen
- Bajkovo
- Barbarevo
- Borisovo
- Draževo
- Kolešino
- Mokrievo
- Mokrino
- Novo Konjarevo
- Samoilovo
- Smolari
- Staro Konjarevo
- Stinik
- Sušica
- Zubovo

== History ==
The fertile soil, mild temperate climate and abundance of water and forest have offered favourable conditions for food and settlement of people since the ancient times. According to the historic evidence, it is believed that ever since the 5th century B.C. this region was inhabited by the Tracian (Peon) Tribes, and from their name, the region itself was called Paeonia. During these centuries, at the south of Peonia, the ancient Macedonian country was founded and started the expansion to the north. This country flourished during the reign of Philip and Alexander the Great.

In the period from the 5th to 7th centuries, the region was inhabited by the Slavs from the Strumjani Tribe. They were frequently attacked by other aggressor tribes, and as a result of the continuous attacks, Novo Selo was often forced to change its location. The first name of the settlement that can be found is “Volčji Dol,” after which the name “Selište” followed. It was named Yeniköy during Ottoman rule.

Towards the end of the 17th century and the beginning of the 18th century, during the period when the Ottoman Empire began to weaken, there was another movement to the location where Yeniköy ("New Village" for Turkish) is situated today. During the reign of the Ottoman Empire, Manus Georgiev Turnovski and Ivan Iliev Ajdinski were famous leaders from Novo Selo.

On 6 April 1941, at the time of the Second World War, Novo Selo was conquered by the German Army. According to the agreement of alliance that Germany had with Bulgaria, Novo Selo was under the occupation of the Bulgarian Army.

During the February Expedition, the partisan troops, led by Mihajlo Apostoloski, crossed the Ograzden Mountain, collided with the German Army in the “Kitka” locality, and succeeded in breaking through the enclosure. Then they proceeded through the village of Novo Konjarevo and the Belasica Mountain. On 10 September 1944 the Bulgarian Army left Novo Selo.

== Tourist attractions ==
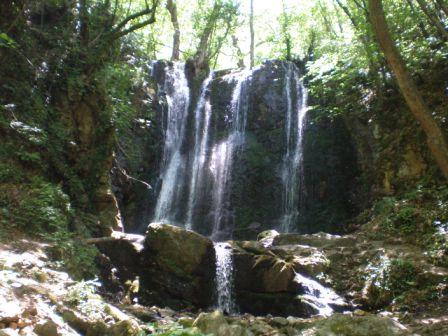
Koleshino Waterfall

=== Koleshino Waterfall ===
The Koleshino Waterfall can be found at an elevation of 610 m (2,001 ft), on the Baba River in the heart of the Belasica Mountain, surrounded by maple trees and stone cliffs. The water of this waterfall falls from the height of 16 m (52 ft).

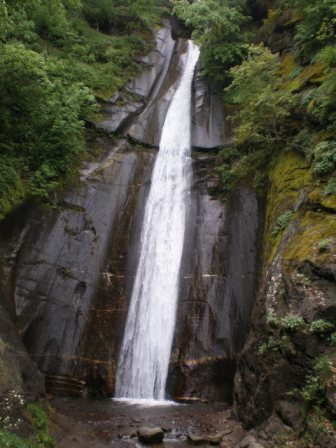
Smolare Waterfall

=== Smolare Waterfall ===
The Smolare Waterfall is found above the village of Smolare, at an elevation of 630 m (2,067 ft), located deep in the Belasica Mountain where the Lomnica River springs from among the hundred-year-old beech wood trees.

The water falls from the height of 36 m (118 ft), the tallest in the country. A pedestrian path was constructed in May 2003 to make the waterfall accessible to visitors. It is 580 m (1,903 ft) long, and has 300 stairs built from local stone, one small wooden bridge and one gazebo with a span of 16.5 m (54 ft). Along the whole length of the path there is a wooden fence built from the local materials.

=== Mokrino Springs ===
Mokrino Springs is found at the foot of the Belasica Mountain at an elevation of 330 m (1,083 ft) in the immediate vicinity of the village of Mokrino. Clear mountain water springs from the roots of the hundred-year-old trees at a capacity of sixty litres a second.

=== Crveno Pole or Red Field ===
The archeological site, “Crveno Pole” or “Red Field” is located 15 km north of the Municipal center of Novo Selo, 8.5 km (5.3 mi) north of the village Barbarevo. It is high in the Ograzden Mountain at an elevation of 1,200 m (3,937 ft).

On a plateau in the center of Red Field, there is a dispersed settlement. On the field of a few hectares there are found a few objects revealing the life and local economy of the ancient residents. The Belogasica River divides the settlement into two parts, the northern part named Janina Cheshma, (“Jane’s Tap”) and the southern part named Papri. Janina Cheshma is located in the western part of the settlement with a rectangular shape oriented north-south and measuring 4.5 by 3.5 m (15 by 11 ft). The tap was used from the 1st to 3rd centuries. Papri has two archeological objects. The first object is located on the southern part of the settlement. It is the remains of a foundation from a building that was constructed on a rock shelf. The foundation was made with stone and earth. The outdoor site surrounding the foundation has the remains of additional walls. The second object was built from stone and mud walls, using the construction technique “opus incertum.” Both objects were built on the rock and they follow the curve of the rock to the south. They are anchored in the rock, and therefore they are very stable.

Southeast of the settlement is the location of Gradishte. On the top of a hill, that has steep and inaccessible cliffs, lies the remains of a “castrum,” a defensive fort to provide protection to the citizens in case of danger. Remains of the foundation reveal the massive fortification of the structure.

A necropolis is positioned on the first hill from the southeast. It is known by the local citizens as “Goosharova Chookarka”, which means “Lizard Hill”. Stone crowns mark the graves on the surface of the earth. Burial in this necropolis started in 100 A.D. and lasted until the end of the 300 A.D. Fifty meters west of the Lizard Hill necropolis, there is the remains of another necropolis with different burial rituals, named Spasov’s Hill. The graves here were dug in the rock and the same rock was used to entomb the sites with a stone plate. This place was used as a necropolis starting in the 4th century.

=== Jane Sandanski House of Culture ===
The Municipality of Novo Selo hosts a cultural institution called the Jane Sandanski House of Culture. The House of Culture has operated for twenty years and provides the community with cultural activities, along with presentations, in the areas of painting, drama, theatre and music, literature, and education.

== Festivals ==
=== St. George's Day Meetings ===
The St. George's Day Meetings have a tradition lasting several years, and they take place every year on May 5, one day before the great Christian festival St. George's Day, when most of the settlements from the Municipality of Novo Selo have village family feasts.

There is also a parade of national costumes and folk-dancing group competition on this day. After the parade, the folk-dancing groups, having their own repertoire, perform in front of an audience. Ensembles from the all over North Macedonia attend these Meetings, and in the past few years, they have become international since groups from the neighboring countries attend place as well.

The Meetings are under the patronage of the Mayor of the Municipality of Novo Selo and are organised by the Jane Sandanski House of Culture from Novo Selo.

=== Ilinden's Meetings ===
On the day of the Macedonian holiday Ilinden (August 2), the centuries-old tradition of the Ilinden Meetings take place every year. These Meetings are organised in the village of Mokrino, situated in the heart of the Belasica Mountain under the hundred-year-old maple trees at the site of the Mokrino Springs. On the day of the Meetings, the people, who once lived in Mokrino, come back home in order to be there for the event. On the same day, the Council of the Village makes a sacrifice as a tribute to the Prophet St. Ilija, and the inhabitants believe that by making this sacrifice, the Prophet will protect them from evil during the whole year.

=== Gathering on St. Petka's Day ===
On the day of the Christian festival St. Petka’s Day (October 27) in the eponymous monastery in the village of Bajkovo, there is a nationwide gathering. On this day, the monastery organises lunch for all the visitors as a tribute to St. Petka. There are people from the whole country at this gathering who come to pay tribute to the Saint.

=== Meeting Under the Maple Trees ===
On June 6, as a tribute to the writer Vidoe Podgorec, the traditional meeting under the maple trees is organized in his birthplace, Koleshino. A number of writers from the whole country come to the Meeting, when excerpts from the works of the author are read. The Meeting is organized by the Grigor Prlicev Primary School from Koleshino.
