= Novo Konjarevo =

Novo Konjarevo Ново Коњарево
- Village
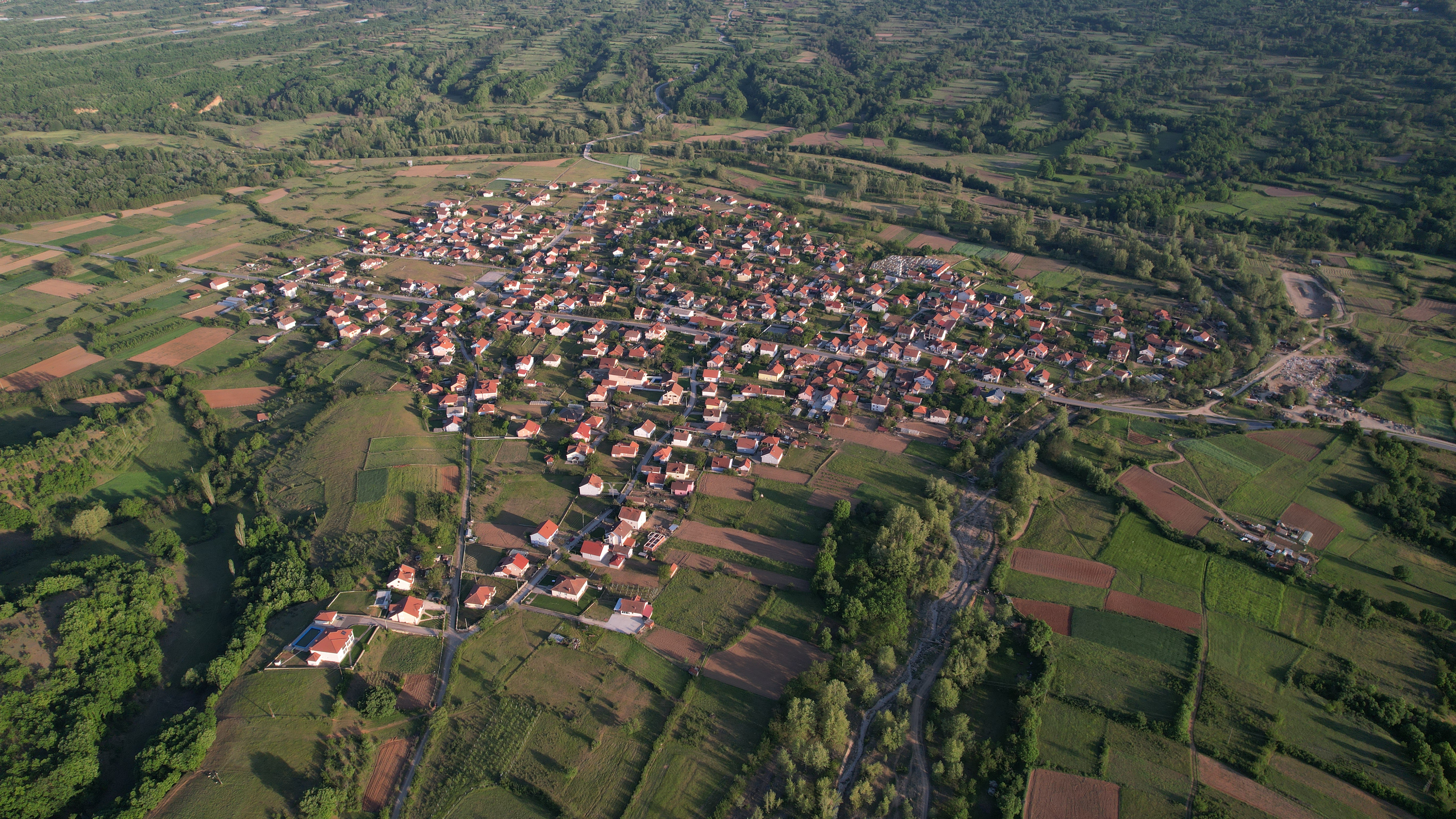
- Air view of the village

- Location within North Macedonia
- Coordinates: 41.395291°N 22.938908°E
- Country: North Macedonia
- Region: Southeastern
- Municipality: Novo Selo

Population (2021)
  - Total: 518
- Time zone: UTC+1 (CET)
  - Summer (DST): UTC+2 (CEST)
- Website: .

Novo Konjarevo (Macedonian: Ново Коњарево) is a village in the municipality of Novo Selo, North Macedonia. It is located close to the Bulgarian border.

== Demographics ==
According to the 2002 census, the village had a total of 934 inhabitants. Ethnic groups in the village include:

- Macedonians 932
- Serbs 2

As of 2021, the village of Novo Konjarevo has 518 inhabitants and the ethnic composition was the following:

- Macedonians – 448
- Albanians – 1
- Person without Data – 69
