= Draževo, Novo Selo =

Draževo Дражево
- Village
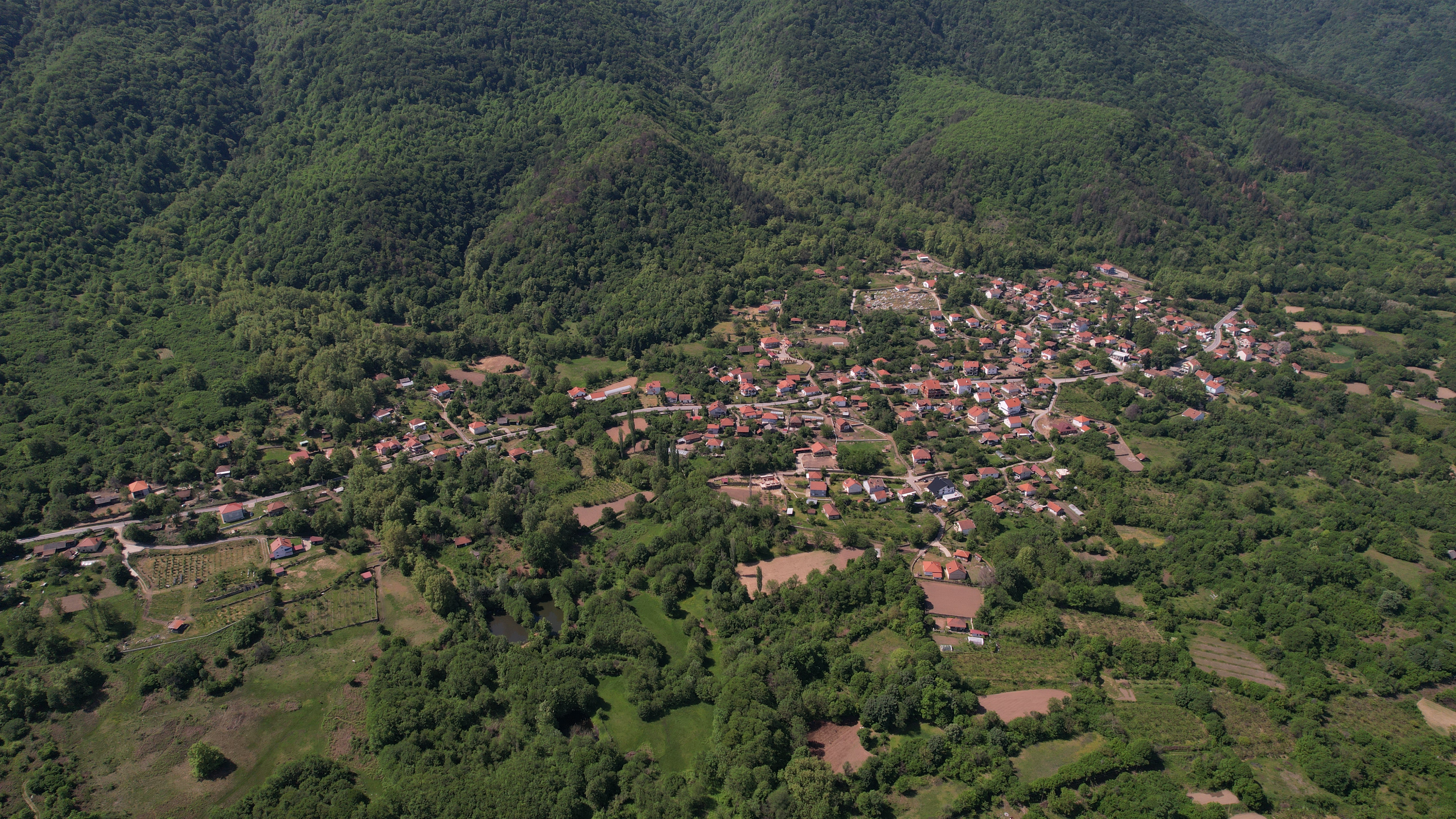
- Air view of the village

- Location within North Macedonia
- Coordinates: 41.374099°N 22.919507°E
- Country: North Macedonia
- Region: Southeastern
- Municipality: Novo Selo

Population (2021)
  - Total: 234
- Time zone: UTC+1 (CET)
  - Summer (DST): UTC+2 (CEST)
- Website: .

Draževo (Macedonian: Дражево) is a village in the municipality of Novo Selo, North Macedonia.

== Demographics ==
According to the 2002 census, the village had a total of 462 inhabitants. Ethnic groups in the village include:

- Macedonians 460
- Serbs 1
- Others 1

As of 2021, the village of Drazhevo has 234 inhabitants and the ethnic composition was the following:

- Macedonians – 200
- Serbs – 1
- Person without Data - 33
