= Togo at the 2023 World Athletics Championships =

- Flag of Togo
- WA code: TOG

in Budapest, Hungary 19 August 2023 – 27 August 2023
- Competitors: 1 (0 men and 1 woman)
- Medals: Gold 0 Silver 0 Bronze 0 Total 0

World Athletics Championships appearances
- 1983; 1987; 1991; 1993; 1995; 1997; 1999; 2001; 2003; 2005; 2007; 2009; 2011; 2013; 2015; 2017; 2019; 2022; 2023

Togo competed at the 2023 World Athletics Championships in Budapest, Hungary, which were held from 19 to 27 August 2023. The athlete delegation of the country was composed of one competitor, hurdler Naomi Akakpo who would compete in the women's 100 metres hurdles. She qualified upon being selected by the Fédération Togolaise d'Athlétisme. In the heats, she placed last out of the nine people that competed in her heat and did not advance further to the semifinals.

== Background ==
The 2023 World Athletics Championships in Budapest, Hungary, were held from 19 to 27 August 2023. The Championships were held at the National Athletics Centre. To qualify for the World Championships, athletes had to reach an entry standard (e.g. time or distance), place in a specific position at select competitions, be a wild card entry, or qualify through their World Athletics Ranking at the end of the qualification period.

As Togo did not meet any of the four standards, they could send either one male or one female athlete in one event of the Championships who has not yet qualified. The Fédération Togolaise d'Athlétisme selected hurdler Naomi Akakpo who had previously competed for the nation at the 2022 World Athletics Championships that were held a year prior.

== Results ==
Key

- Q = Qualified for the next round
- q = Qualified for the next round as a fastest loser or, in field events, by position without achieving the qualifying target
- NR = National record
- PB = Personal best
- SB = Season best
- N/A = Round not applicable for the event

=== Women ===
Akakpo competed in the heats of the women's 100 metres hurdles on 22 August against eight other competitors in her round. She recorded a time of 13.96 seconds in the round and placed last in her heat. Due to this, she did not advance further to the semifinals of the event.

Track and road events

Athlete	Event	Heat		Semifinal		Final	
Athlete	Event	Result	Rank	Result	Rank	Result	Rank
Naomi Akakpo	100 metres hurdles	13.96	9	Did not advance			
