= Oman at the 2023 World Athletics Championships =

- Flag of Oman
- WA code: OMA

in Budapest, Hungary 19 August 2023 – 27 August 2023
- Competitors: 1 (1 man and 0 women)
- Medals: Gold 0 Silver 0 Bronze 0 Total 0

World Athletics Championships appearances
- 1983; 1987; 1991; 1993; 1995; 1997; 1999; 2001; 2003; 2005–2007; 2009; 2011; 2013; 2015; 2017; 2019; 2022; 2023

Oman competed at the 2023 World Athletics Championships in Budapest, Hungary, which were held from 19 to 27 August 2023. The athlete delegation of the country was composed of one competitor, sprinter Mohamed Obaid Alsadi who would compete in the men's 200 metres. He qualified upon being selected by the Oman Athletic Association. Alsadi placed seventh in his heat out of the eight competitors that competed in his heat and did not advance to the semifinals.

== Background ==
The 2023 World Athletics Championships in Budapest, Hungary, were held from 19 to 27 August 2023. The Championships were held at the National Athletics Centre. To qualify for the World Championships, athletes had to reach an entry standard (e.g. time or distance), place in a specific position at select competitions, be a wild card entry, or qualify through their World Athletics Ranking at the end of the qualification period.

As Oman did not meet any of the four standards, they could send either one male or one female athlete in one event of the Championships who has not yet qualified. The Oman Athletic Association selected sprinter Mohamed Obaid Alsadi who previously competed for the nation at the 2017 IAAF World Championships held in London. At the time, he held a personal best of 20.62 seconds and was ranked 206 in the world for the event.

== Results ==
Key

- Q = Qualified for the next round
- q = Qualified for the next round as a fastest loser or, in field events, by position without achieving the qualifying target
- NR = National record
- PB = Personal best
- SB = Season best
- N/A = Round not applicable for the event

=== Men ===
Alsadi competed in the heats of the men's 200 metres on 23 August against seven other competitors. He raced in the fourth heat and recorded a time of 21.39 seconds. He would place seventh in his heat and would not advance further to the semifinals.

Track and road events

| Athlete | Event | Heat | | Semifinal | | Final | |
| Athlete | Event | Result | Rank | Result | Rank | Result | Rank |
|---|---|---|---|---|---|---|---|
| Mohamed Obaid Alsadi | 200 metres | 21.39 | 7 | Did not advance | | | |
