= North Macedonia at the 2022 World Athletics Championships =

- Flag of North Macedonia
- WA code: MKD

in Eugene, Oregon, United States 15 July 2022 – 24 July 2022
- Competitors: 1 (1 woman)
- Medals: Gold 0 Silver 0 Bronze 0 Total 0

World Athletics Championships appearances
- 1995; 1997; 1999; 2001; 2003; 2005; 2007; 2009; 2011; 2013; 2015; 2017; 2019; 2022; 2023

Other related appearances
- Yugoslavia (1983–1991)

North Macedonia competed at the 2022 World Athletics Championships in Eugene, Oregon, United States, from 15 to 24 July 2022.

== Results ==
North Macedonia entered one athlete.

Key

- Q = Qualified for the next round
- q = Qualified for the next round as a fastest loser or, in field events, by position without achieving the qualifying target
- NR = National record
- PB = Personal best
- SB = Season best
- N/A = Round not applicable for the event

=== Women ===
Track and road events

| Athlete | Event | Final | |
| Athlete | Event | Result | Rank |
|---|---|---|---|
| Adrijana Pop Arsova | Marathon | 2:41:20 | 28 |
