= Chloe David =

Vanuatuan sprinter (born 2005)

Personal information
- Nationality: Vanuatu
- Born: 3 June 2005 (age 21)
- Height: 174 cm (5 ft 9 in)

Sport
- Country: Vanuatu
- Sport: Athletics
- Event: 100 m

Achievements and titles
- Personal bests: 12.40s (100 m); 26.52s (200 m)

Chloe David (born 3 June 2005) is a Ni-Vanuatu sprinter. She represented Vanuatu in the women's 100 metres event at the 2024 Summer Olympics.

== Career ==
David represented Vanuatu at the 2022 Commonwealth Games in Birmingham, England, in the women's 100 and 200 metres event.

She participated in the women's 100 metres at the 2023 World Athletics Championships in Budapest, Hungary. She placed seventh in Heat 2 of the first round with a time of 12.88 seconds.

In 2024, She competed for Vanuatu in the women's 100 metres event at the Summer Olympics. She ran a personal best time of 12.44 seconds in Heat 3 of the preliminary round, she finished in sixth place and did not qualify for the next round.

In September 2025, she competed in the 100 metres at the 2025 World Championships in Tokyo, Japan, running a personal best 12.40 seconds.

== Personal life ==
David discovered her passion for athletics in primary school. She attended Suva Grammar School with her sister in Fiji. Her younger sister, Claudie, is also an athlete.
