= Vanuatu at the 2015 World Championships in Athletics =

- WA code: VAN

in Beijing
- Competitors: 1
- Medals: Gold 0 Silver 0 Bronze 0 Total 0

World Championships in Athletics appearances
- 1983; 1987; 1991; 1993; 1995; 1997; 1999; 2001; 2003; 2005; 2007; 2009; 2011; 2013; 2015; 2017; 2019; 2022; 2023

Vanuatu competed at the 2015 World Championships in Athletics in Beijing, China, from 22–30 August 2015.

== Results ==
(q – qualified, NM – no mark, SB – season best, PB - personal best)

=== Men ===
Track and road events

Athlete	Event	Preliminary Round		Heat		Semifinal		Final	
Athlete	Event	Result	Rank	Result	Rank	Result	Rank	Result	Rank
Womel Brandy Mento	100 metres	11.17 PB	18	did not advance					
