= Vanuatu at the 2009 World Championships in Athletics =

- WA code: VAN

in Berlin
- Competitors: 2
- Medals: Gold 0 Silver 0 Bronze 0 Total 0

World Championships in Athletics appearances
- 1983; 1987; 1991; 1993; 1995; 1997; 1999; 2001; 2003; 2005; 2007; 2009; 2011; 2013; 2015; 2017; 2019; 2022; 2023

Vanuatu competed at the 2009 World Championships in Athletics from 15–23 August. A team of 2 athletes was announced in preparation for the competition.

== Team selection ==
Track and road events

| Event | Athletes | |
| Event | Men | Women |
|---|---|---|
| 100 metres | | Elis Lapenmal |
| 800 metres | Arnold Sorina | |
