= Yendountien Tiebekabe =

Togolese sprinter (born 1991)

Personal information
- Born: 18 January 1991 (age 34)

Sport
- Country: Togo
- Sport: Track and field
- Event: 100 metres

Yendountien Tiebekabe (born 18 January 1991) is a Togolese sprinter. He competed in the 100 metres event at the 2015 World Championships in Athletics in Beijing, China. In 2019, he competed in the men's 100 metres event at the 2019 World Athletics Championships in Doha, Qatar. He competed in the preliminary round and he did not advance to compete in the heats.

Tiebekabe competed in the 2020 France Élite meeting in Pas-de-Calais.
