= Riste Pandev =

Macedonian sprinter

Personal information
- Nationality: Macedonian
- Born: 25 January 1994 (age 31) Novo Konjarevo, Novo Selo, Macedonia
- Height: 178 cm (5 ft 10 in)
- Weight: 67 kg (148 lb)

Sport
- Sport: Track and field
- Event: 100m
- Coached by: Vančo Stojanov

Riste Pandev (born 25 January 1994) is a Macedonian sprinter. He competed in the 100 metres event at the 2013 World Championships in Athletics. He holds the Macedonian record in the 100m with time of 10.61 placed in Pravets, Bulgaria on 15 June 2013. On 6 July 2014 he broke the Macedonian record on 200m with the time of 21.65 posted in La Chaux-de-Fonds, Switzerland.

== Personal achievements ==
Event	Result	Wind	Place	Date
50m Ind.	6.09		Wettingen (SUI)	11 January 2014
60m Ind.	6.86		Magglingen (SUI)	16 February 2013
100m	10.61	+1.5	Pravets (BUL)	15 June 2013
200m	21.65	-1.2	La Chaux-de-Fonds (SUI)	6 July 2014
200m Ind.	22.19		Magglingen (SUI)	25 January 2014
4 × 100 m	42.86		Banská Bystrica (SVK)	23 June 2013

- 4 × 100 m with Kristijan Efremov, Riste Ajdarov, Sasho Golubic
