= Daniel Philimon =

Vanuatuan sprinter

Personal information
- Nationality: Vanuatuan
- Born: 25 May 1995 (age 30)

Sport
- Sport: Track and field
- Event: 100m

Daniel Philimon (born 25 May 1995) is a Vanuatuan sprinter. He competed in the 100 metres event at the 2013 World Championships in Athletics.
