= Athletics Vanuatu =

Sports governing body in Vanuatu

- Sport: Athletics
- Founded: 1965
- Affiliation: IAAF
- Affiliation date: 1966
- Regional affiliation: OAA
- Headquarters: Port Vila, Efate
- President: Jansen Molisingi
- Vice president: Reynold Alatoa
- Secretary: David Benjimen
- Replaced: New Hebrides Amateur Athletic Association
- (Vanuatu)

Athletics Vanuatu, also known as Vanuatu Athletics Association, is the governing body for the sport of athletics in Vanuatu. Current president is former sprinter Jansen Molisingi. He was elected for the first time in February 2012.

== History ==
Athletics Vanuatu was founded in 1965 as New Hebrides Amateur Athletic Association by Rev. William Donald Francis, Alan Bell, and a few others, and was affiliated to the IAAF in the year 1966.

== Affiliations ==
- International Association of Athletics Federations (IAAF)
- Oceania Athletics Association (OAA)

Moreover, it is part of the following national organisations:

- Vanuatu Association of Sports and National Olympic Committee (VASANOC)

== National records ==
Athletics Vanuatu maintains the Vanuatuan records in athletics.
