= Flag of Vanuatu =

Vanuatu
- Flag of Vanuatu assuming an aspect ratio of 2:3
- Flaeg blong Vanuatu
- Use: National flag, civil and state ensign
- Proportion: 2:3, 3:5 or 19:36
- Adopted: 18 February 1980
- Design: A horizontal bicolor of red and green with a golden pall, fimbriated in black, with a black triangle filling the space at the hoist (alternately, a golden fillet pall surmounting a black gusset) and two gold crossed namele cycad fronds encircled in a gold boar tusk centered on the triangle.
- Designed by: Kalontas Mahlon

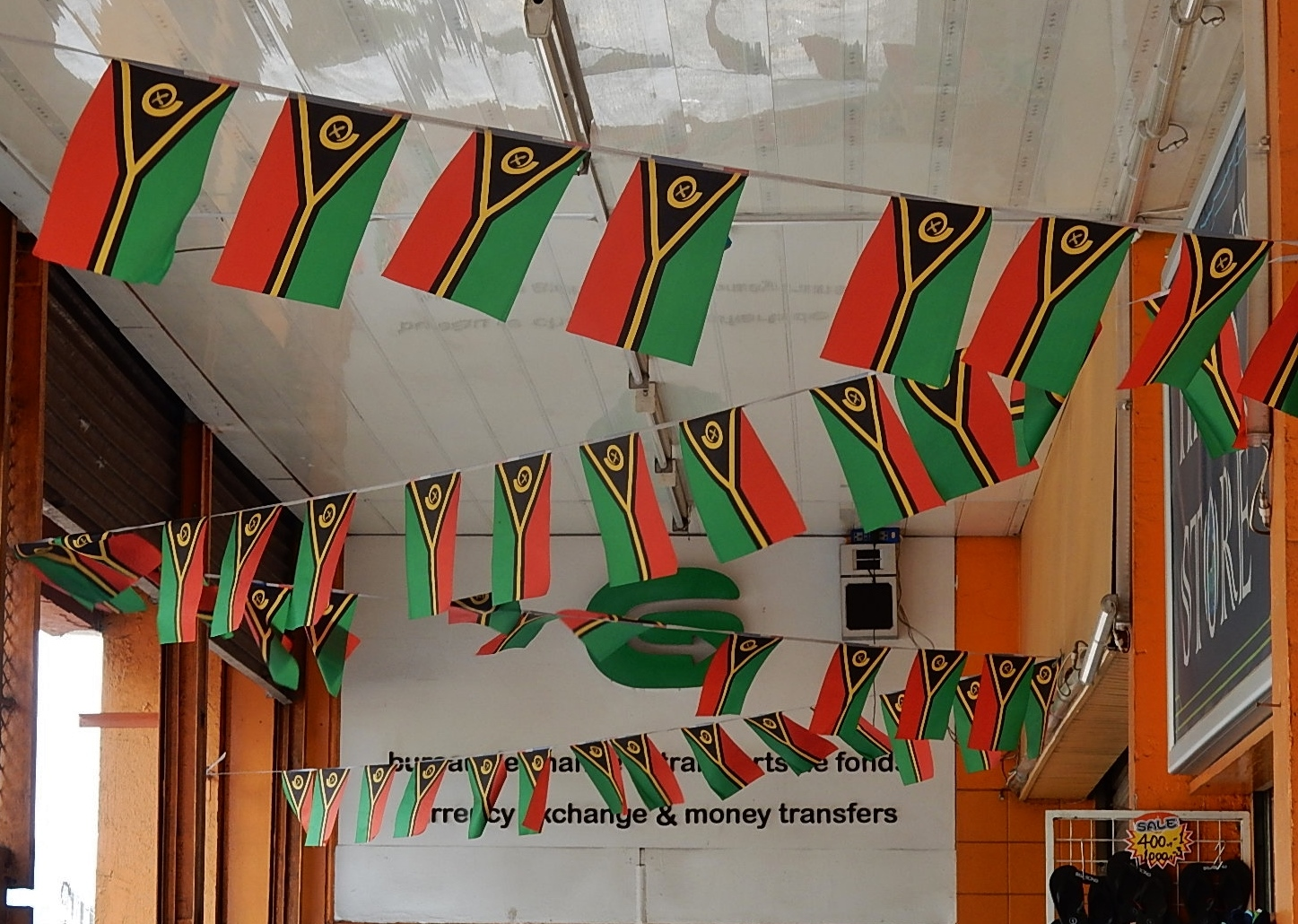
Vanuatu flag bunting flying prior to the 2016 Vanuatuan general election

The national flag of Vanuatu (flaeg blong Vanuatu) was adopted on 18 February 1980.

In 1977 a flag of almost the same colours and symbolism as the future national flag was designed by local artist Kalontas Malon and adopted by the Vanua'aku Pati. When the party led the New Hebrides to independence as Vanuatu in 1980, the colours of the party flag (red, green, black and yellow) were chosen to be the basis for the national flag on Independence Day, 30 July 1980. A parliamentary committee chose the final design based on submissions from local artists.

== Symbolism ==
Tusk and cycad frond detail

The green represents the richness of the islands, the red symbolises blood which unites humanity as humans, and the black the Melanesian ni-Vanuatu people. The Prime Minister of Vanuatu, Father Walter Lini, requested the inclusion of yellow and black fimbriations to make the black stand out. The yellow Y-shape (pall) represents the shape of Vanuatu islands on the map and the light of the gospel going through the pattern of the islands in the Pacific Ocean (approximately 83% of the people of Vanuatu profess Christianity).

The emblem in the black is a boar's tusk—the symbol of customs and tradition but also prosperity. It is worn as a pendant on the islands—along with two leaves of the local namele tree. These leaves are supposed to be a token of peace, and their 39 leaflets represent the original 39 members of the Parliament of Vanuatu.

== Construction ==
The government does not publish a formal specification sheet on its website. The construction sheet shown below is based on measurements from the official 2:3 flag image that appears in the State Flag and Armorial Bearings Public Declaration dated March 18, 1980.

== Other flags of Vanuatu ==
=== Government flag ===
Flag	Date	Use	Description
	1980–present	Presidential standard	A green field with a red border and the national coat of arms in the center

=== Military flags ===
Flag	Date	Use	Description
	1980–present	Naval ensign	A white field with the national flag in the canton
		Flag of the Vanuatu Mobile Forces	
		Flag of the Vanuatu Police Force	

=== Political flags ===
Flag	Date	Use	Description
Link to file	1966–present	Flag of the Nagriamel Movement	
Link to file	1971–present	Flag of the Vanua'aku Pati	

== Subnational flags from Vanuatu ==
=== Provincial flags ===
Flag	Date	Use	Description
	?–present	Flag of the Malampa Province	
	?–present	Flag of the Penama Province	
	?–present	Flag of the Sanma Province	
	?–present	Flag of the Shefa Province	
	?–present	Flag of the Tafea Province	
	?–present	Flag of the Torba Province	

=== Secessionist group flags ===
Flag	Date	Use	Description
	1980	Reconstructed secessionist flag of the Tafea Nation	
	1980	Flag of the island of Tanna, in Tafea Province, and of its secessionist movement	

=== City flags ===
Flag	Date	Use	Description
	2020–present	Flag of Port Vila	
	?–2020	Previous flag of Port Vila	
	?–present	Flag of Luganville	

== Historical flags of the New Hebrides ==
Flag	Date	Use	Description
	1845–1862	Flag of the Tuʻi Tonga Empire in Vanuatu	A white field with two red crosses, two blue crosses and the letters and a blue "M" and a red "A" in the center
	1862–1866	Flag of the Tuʻi Tonga Empire in Vanuatu	A white field with a red cross in the center
	1889–1890	Flag of Franceville	A vertical bicolour of white and red with a blue square in the center and five five-pointed stars inside the square
	1906–1953	Flag of the British New Hebrides	A Blue Ensign with the emblem of New Hebrides (with the Tudor Crown)
	1906–1953	Flag of the British resident commissioner	The Union Jack defaced with the emblem of New Hebrides (with the Tudor Crown)
	1953–1980	Flag of the British New Hebrides	A Blue Ensign with the emblem of New Hebrides (with the St Edward's Crown)
	1953–1980	Flag of the British resident commissioner	The Union Jack defaced with the emblem of New Hebrides (with the St Edward's Crown)
	1906–1940; 1944–1980	Flag of the French New Hebrides	A vertical tricolour of blue, white, and red (proportions 3:2)
	1940–1944	Flag of the Free French administration of New Hebrides	A vertical tricolour of blue, white, and red with the Cross of Lorraine
	1977–1978	Flag of the Vanuaaku People's Provisional Government	
	1980	Flag of the ephemeral Republic of Vemerana	A blue field with a green five-pointed star in the center

=== Pacific Games flags ===
Flag	Date	Use	Description
	1963	Flag attested as being used in the 1963 South Pacific Games	A vertical tricolour of blue, white, and red with the flags of France and the United Kingdom in the center
	1966; 1971	Flag attested as being used in the 1966 and 1971 South Pacific Games	A blue field with the emblem of the New Hebrides in the center
	1969	Dark blue version attested at the time of the 1969 South Pacific Games	Similar to the previous flag

== See also ==
- Coat of arms of Vanuatu

== Bibliography ==
- "Vanuatu". The World Factbook. United States Central Intelligence Agency. 20 June 2014. Archived from the original on 9 January 2021.
