= Brunei at the 2025 World Athletics Championships =

- Flag of Brunei
- WA code: BRU

in Tokyo, Japan 13 September 2025 – 21 September 2025
- Competitors: 1 (1 man and 0 women)
- Medals: Gold 0 Silver 0 Bronze 0 Total 0

World Athletics Championships appearances
- 1991; 1993; 1995; 1997; 1999; 2001; 2003; 2005; 2007; 2009; 2011; 2013; 2015; 2017; 2019; 2022–2023; 2025

Brunei competed at the 2025 World Athletics Championships in Tokyo, Japan, which were held from 13 to 21 September 2025. The athlete delegation of the country consisted of one competitor, sprinter Abdul Rahim Abdullah who competed in the men's 100 metres. Abdullah qualified upon being selected by the Brunei Darussalam Athletics Federation. In the preliminary round heats, he injured himself during the race and did not finish, thus not advancing further.

== Background ==
The 2025 World Athletics Championships in Tokyo, Japan, were held from 19 to 27 August 2023. The Championships were held at the Japan National Stadium. To qualify for the World Championships, athletes had to reach an entry standard (e.g. time or distance), place in a specific position at select competitions, be a wild card entry, or qualify through their World Athletics Ranking at the end of the qualification period.

As Brunei did not meet any of the four standards, they could send either one male or one female athlete in one event of the Championships who has not yet qualified. The Brunei Darussalam Athletics Federation selected sprinter Abdul Rahim Abdullah who would compete in the men's 100 metres. In the entry list for the Championships, he had a personal best of 10.77 seconds and was unranked within the World Athletics Rankings.

== Results ==
Key

- Q = Qualified for the next round
- q = Qualified for the next round as a fastest loser or, in field events, by position without achieving the qualifying target
- NR = National record
- PB = Personal best
- SB = Season best
- N/A = Round not applicable for the event

=== Men ===
Abdullah competed in the first preliminary round heat of the men's 100 metres on 13 September against eight other sprinters. There, he injured himself, only managing 40 metres on the track and did not finish the race. Thus, he did not advance further to the first round heats as he was not within the top two of his heat nor was he one of the two next fastest sprinters.

Track and road events

| Athlete | Event | Preliminary | | Heat | | Semifinal | | Final | |
| Athlete | Event | Result | Rank | Result | Rank | Result | Rank | Result | Rank |
|---|---|---|---|---|---|---|---|---|---|
| Abdul Rahim Abdullah | 100 metres | Did not finish | | Did not advance | | | | | |
