= Iraq at the 2025 World Athletics Championships =

- Flag of Iraq
- WA code: IRQ

in Tokyo, Japan 13 September 2025 – 21 September 2025
- Competitors: 1 (1 man and 0 women)
- Medals: Gold 0 Silver 0 Bronze 0 Total 0

World Athletics Championships appearances
- 1983; 1987–1995; 1997; 1999; 2001–2005; 2007; 2009; 2011; 2013; 2015; 2017; 2019; 2022; 2023; 2025

Iraq competed at the 2025 World Athletics Championships in Tokyo, Japan, from 13 to 21 September 2025.

== Results ==
Iraq entered 1 male athlete.

Key

- Q = Qualified for the next round
- q = Qualified for the next round as a fastest loser or, in field events, by position without achieving the qualifying target
- NR = National record
- PB = Personal best
- SB = Season best
- N/A = Round not applicable for the event

=== Men ===
Track and road events

Athlete	Event	Preliminary		Heat		Semifinal		Final	
Athlete	Event	Result	Rank	Result	Rank	Result	Rank	Result	Rank
Saif Al-Rammahi	100 metres	10.56	1 Q	10.58	8	Did not advance			
