= Timor-Leste at the World Athletics Championships =

Timor-Leste at the World Championships in Athletics
- WA code: TLS
- National federation: Federaçao Timor-Leste de Atletismo
- Medals: Gold 0 Silver 0 Bronze 0 Total 0

World Championships in Athletics appearances
- 2011; 2013; 2015–2017; 2019; 2022; 2023; 2025

East Timor has competed in the IAAF World Athletics Championships three times with their first appearance being in 2011 at Daegu, South Korea with Ribeiro de Carvalho competing in the men's 1500m. As of 2019, the country has not recorded any medals with East Timor's best performance being in the same year when Ribeiro de Carvalho placed 37th in the Men's 1500 metres.

== Entrants ==
Athlete	Event	Championships
Ribeiro de Carvalho	Men's 800 metres	2013
Ribeiro de Carvalho	Men's 1500 metres	2011
Roberto Belo Amaral Soares	Men's 800 metres	2019
