= Jamaica at the 2025 World Athletics Championships =

- Flag of Jamaica
- WA code: JAM

in Tokyo, Japan 13 September 2025 – 21 September 2025
- Competitors: 67 (35 men and 32 women)
- Medals Ranked 10th: Gold 1 Silver 6 Bronze 3 Total 10

World Athletics Championships appearances
- 1983; 1987; 1991; 1993; 1995; 1997; 1999; 2001; 2003; 2005; 2007; 2009; 2011; 2013; 2015; 2017; 2019; 2022; 2023; 2025

Jamaica competed at the 2025 World Athletics Championships in Tokyo, Japan, from 13 to 21 September 2025.

== Medalists ==
Medal	Athlete	Event	Date
Gold	Oblique Seville	Men's 100 metres	14 September
Silver	Tina Clayton	Women's 100 metres	14 September
Silver	Kishane Thompson	Men's 100 metres	14 September
Silver	Orlando Bennett	Men's 110 metres hurdles	16 September
Silver	Tajay Gayle	Men's long jump	17 September
Silver	Shelly-Ann Fraser-Pryce; Tia Clayton; Tina Clayton; Jonielle Smith; Jodean Williams*	Women's 4 × 100 metres relay	21 September
Silver	Dejanea Oakley; Stacey Ann Williams; Andrenette Knight; Nickisha Pryce; Roneisha McGregor*	Women's 4 × 400 metres relay	21 September
Bronze	Tyler Mason	Men's 110 metres hurdles	16 September
Bronze	Bryan Levell	Men's 200 metres	19 September
Bronze	Shericka Jackson	Women's 200 metres	19 September

* – Indicates the athlete competed in preliminaries but not the final

== Results ==
Jamaica entered 67 athletes to the championships: 35 men and 32 women.

Key

- Q = Qualified for the next round
- q = Qualified for the next round as a fastest loser or, in field events, by position without achieving the qualifying target
- NR = National record
- PB = Personal best
- SB = Season best
- N/A = Round not applicable for the event

=== Men ===
Track and road events

Athlete	Event	Heat		Semifinal		Final	
Athlete	Event	Result	Rank	Result	Rank	Result	Rank
Ackeem Blake	100 metres	10.07	2 Q	10.12	5	Did not advance	
Oblique Seville	100 metres	9.93	3 Q	9.86	1 Q	9.77 PB	1st place, gold medalist(s)
Kishane Thompson	100 metres	9.95	1 Q	9.85	2 Q	9.82	2nd place, silver medalist(s)
Adrian Kerr	200 metres	20.13	3 Q	20.08 PB	5	Did not advance	
Bryan Levell	200 metres	19.84	1 Q	19.78	1 Q	19.64 PB	3rd place, bronze medalist(s)
Christopher Taylor	200 metres	20.26 PB	3 Q	20.21 PB	5	Did not advance	
Delano Kennedy	400 metres	44.74 PB	4 q	44.97	7	Did not advance	
Rusheen McDonald	400 metres	44.38 SB	2 Q	44.04 SB	2 Q	44.28	4
Bovel McPherson	400 metres	44.51 PB	3 Q	44.99	6	Did not advance	
Antonio Watson	400 metres	46.23	8	Did not advance			
Navasky Anderson	800 metres	1:44.87	3 Q	1:43.72 NR	3 q	1:42.76 NR	7
Tyrice Taylor	800 metres	1:45.13	3 Q	1:46.56	7	Did not advance	
Orlando Bennett	110 metres hurdles	13.20	1 Q	13.27	1 Q	13,08 PB	2nd place, silver medalist(s)
Tyler Mason	110 metres hurdles	13.17 SB	1 Q	13.12	1 Q	13,12 PB	3rd place, bronze medalist(s)
Demario Prince	110 metres hurdles	13.31	4 Q	13.22	3	Did not advance	
Roshawn Clarke	400 metres hurdles	48.83	5 q	48.37	4	Did not advance	
Malik James-King	400 metres hurdles	48.27 SB	4 Q	48.01 SB	4	Did not advance	
Assinie Wilson	400 metres hurdles	49.91	8	Did not advance			
Ackeem Blake; Ryiem Forde; Oblique Seville; Kishane Thompson	4 × 100 metres relay	Did not finish		—N/a		Did not advance	
Jasauna Dennis; Delano Kennedy; Rusheen McDonald; Bovel McPherson*; Jevaughn Powell	4 × 400 metres relay	2:59.13 SB	4 q	—N/a		3:03.46	7

Field events

Athlete	Event	Qualification		Final	
Athlete	Event	Distance	Position	Distance	Position
Romaine Beckford	High jump	2.25	12 q	NM	
Raymond Richards	High jump	2.16	22	Did not advance	
Tajay Gayle	Long jump	8.28	1 Q	8.34 SB	2nd place, silver medalist(s)
Carey McLeod	Long jump	7.86	20	Did not advance	
Nikaoli Williams	Long jump	8.15	4 Q	7.85	9
Jordan Scott	Triple jump	17.19	2 Q	17.21	5
Fedrick Dacres	Discus throw	60.54	28	Did not advance	
Ralford Mullings	Discus throw	56.82	35	Did not advance	
Chad Wright	Discus throw	62.87	19	Did not advance	

=== Women ===
Track and road events

Athlete	Event	Heat		Semifinal		Final	
Athlete	Event	Result	Rank	Result	Rank	Result	Rank
Tina Clayton	100 metres	11.01	1 Q	10.90	2 Q	10.76 PB	2nd place, silver medalist(s)
Shelly-Ann Fraser-Pryce	100 metres	11.09	2 Q	11.00	2 Q	11.03	6
Shericka Jackson	100 metres	11.04	2 Q	10.97	2 Q	10.88 =SB	4
Shericka Jackson	200 metres	22.33	1 Q	21.99 SB	1 Q	22.18	3rd place, bronze medalist(s)
Gabrielle Matthews	200 metres	23.40	7	Did not advance			
Ashanti Moore	200 metres	22.57	2 Q	22.51	3	Did not advance	
Dejanea Oakley	400 metres	51.07	3 Q	51.42	7	Did not advance	
Nickisha Pryce	400 metres	49.91	1 Q	49.46 SB	3 q	49.97	8
Stacey-Ann Williams	400 metres	49.59 PB	2 Q	50.39	5	Did not advance	
Kelly-Ann Beckford	800 metres	2:02.63	4	Did not advance			
Natoya Goule-Toppin	800 metres	1:59.66	1 Q	1:59.58	5	Did not advance	
Adelle Tracey	800 metres	2:01.70	7	Did not advance			
Adelle Tracey	1500 metres	4:11.87	13	Did not advance			
Amoi Brown	100 metres hurdles	12.82	3 Q	12.93	6	Did not advance	
Ackera Nugent	100 metres hurdles	12.54	1 Q	12.63	3	Did not advance	
Megan Tapper	100 metres hurdles	Did not start		Did not advance			
Danielle Williams	100 metres hurdles	12.40	1 Q	12.44	2 Q	12.53	7
Andrenette Knight	400 metres hurdles	53.74	2 Q	54.35	5	Did not advance	
Shiann Salmon	400 metres hurdles	54.21 SB	2 Q	54.03 SB	2 Q	56.27	8
Tia Clayton; Tina Clayton; Shelly-Ann Fraser-Pryce; Jonielle Smith; Jodean Williams*	4 × 100 metres relay	41.80 SB	1 Q	—N/a		41.79 SB	2nd place, silver medalist(s)
Andrenette Knight; Roneisha McGregor*; Dejanea Oakley; Nickisha Pryce; Stacey-Ann Williams	4 × 400 metres relay	3:22.77 WL	1 Q	—N/a		3:19.25 SB	2nd place, silver medalist(s)

Field events

Athlete	Event	Qualification		Final	
Athlete	Event	Distance	Position	Distance	Position
Lamara Distin	High jump	NM		Did not advance	
Ackelia Smith	Long jump	6.34	26	Did not advance	
Shanieka Ricketts	Triple jump	14.30	5 q	14.56	5
Ackelia Smith	Triple jump	14.21	8 q	14.37	8
Lloydricia Cameron	Shot put	17.77	16	Did not advance	
Samantha Hall	Discus throw	63.32	10 q	60.69	12
Nayoka Clunis	Hammer throw	68.24	25	Did not advance	

=== Mixed ===
Track events

Athlete	Event	Heat		Final	
Athlete	Event	Result	Rank	Result	Rank
Leah Anderson (W); Zandrion Barnes (M); Dejanea Oakley (W); Jevaughn Powell (M)	4 × 400 metres relay	3:13.96	8	Did not advance	
