= 2025 World Athletics Championships – Men's 100 metres =

Men's 100 metres at the 2025 World Athletics Championships
- Venue: National Stadium
- Location: Tokyo, Japan
- Dates: 13 September (preliminary rounds & heats); 14 September (semi-finals & final)
- Competitors: 77 from 52 nations
- Winning time: 9.77

Medalists
gold medal	Oblique Seville	Jamaica
silver medal	Kishane Thompson	Jamaica
bronze medal	Noah Lyles	United States

The men's 100 metres at the 2025 World Athletics Championships was held at the National Stadium in Tokyo on 13 and 14 September 2025.

== Summary ==
Through the 2025 season, Kishane Thompson came in as the World leader, his 9.75 at the Jamaican Championships making him #6 of all time. During the opening heats he had such a lead he shut it down early and still cruised to a 9.95. Defending champion Noah Lyles had already been beaten by Thompson in the Diamond League. He ran a more serious race to equal 9.95. Snakebit at the last three major championships, Oblique Seville again showed signs of brilliance this season. He had the misfortune to get seeded into the fast heat as Gift Leotlela and Kayinsola Ajayi battled to sub 9.9 times in the heats, making Seville's 9.93 look like a desperate rescue.

Lyles and Ajayi ran through semi final one easily enough, bringing Akani Simbine sub 10 for a time qualifier. The highlight of the semis was the second heat where Thompson and Kenny Bednarek battled to an exact time tie at 9.844. In an extreme statistical rarity, 3rd and 4th place Zharnel Hughes and Jerome Blake also had an exact time tie in a non-qualifying 10.022. In the third semi, Seville showed his brilliance with a 9.86 separating from returning silver medalist and Olympic 200 gold medalist Letsile Tebogo.

In the final, Letsile Tebogo left everybody in the blocks. Unfortunately, the gun hadn't fired yet. After some discussion, he was disqualified. On the second calling, Oblique Seville (0.157s) and Kishane Thompson (0.160s) had the quickest reaction times, while Bednarek had the slowest reaction time (0.211s). By the halfway point, Thompson had a step on everybody but Seville. Over the last half, Noah Lyles accelerated in the final metres to secure third place, while Seville matched that kind of speed to ease past Thompson and take the win. Seville's winning time of 9.77 put him into the top ten of all time.

== Records ==
Before the competition records were as follows:

Record	Athlete & Nat.	Perf.	Location	Date
World record	Usain Bolt (JAM)	9.58	Berlin, Germany	16 August 2009
Championship record	Usain Bolt (JAM)	9.58	Berlin, Germany	16 August 2009
World Leading	Kishane Thompson (JAM)	9.75	Kingston, Jamaica	27 June 2025
African Record	Ferdinand Omanyala (KEN)	9.77	Nairobi, Kenya	18 September 2021
Asian Record	Su Bingtian (CHN)	9.83	Tokyo, Japan	1 August 2021
European Record	Marcell Jacobs (ITA)	9.80	Tokyo, Japan	1 August 2021
North, Central American and Caribbean record	Usain Bolt (JAM)	9.58	Berlin, Germany	16 August 2009
Oceanian record	Patrick Johnson (AUS)	9.93	Mito, Japan	5 May 2003
South American Record	Erik Cardoso (BRA)	9.93	São Paulo, Brazil	31 July 2025

== Qualification standard ==
The standard to qualify automatically for entry was 10.00.

== Schedule ==
The event schedule, in local time (UTC+9), was as follows:

Date	Time	Round
13 September	11:10	Preliminary round
13 September	20:35	Heats
14 September	20:45	Semi-finals
14 September	22:20	Final

== Results ==
=== Preliminary round ===
The preliminary round took place on 13 September. The first two athletes in each heat ( Q ) and the next two fastest ( q ) qualified for round 1.

==== Heat 1 ====
Place	Lane	Athlete	Nation	Time	Notes
1	6	Christopher Borzor	Haiti	10.41	Q
2	5	Zaid Ashraf Omar Al-Awamleh	Jordan	10.62	Q
3	3	D'Angelo Huisden	Suriname	10.89	
4	4	Sanjay Weekes	Montserrat	11.08	
5	9	Titali Kolomalu	Tonga	11.29	PB
6	1	Matthew Fiso	American Samoa	11.40	PB
7	2	Salin Tort	Cambodia	11.42	SB
8	7	Marcos Santos	Angola	11.72	
—	8	Abdul Rahim Abdullah	Brunei	DNF	
				Wind: (−0.8 m/s)	

==== Heat 2 ====
Place	Lane	Athlete	Nation	Time	Notes
1	6	Saif Al-Rammahi	Iraq	10.56	Q
2	4	Dylan Sicobo	Seychelles	10.79	Q
3	7	Olivier Mwimba	DR Congo	10.92	
4	5	Winzar Kakiouea	Nauru	10.93	
5	3	Stanislaus Kostka	Federated States of Micronesia	11.48	SB
6	8	Tyson Chinn	Palau	11.55	
7	2	Ty'ree Langidrik	Marshall Islands	11.68	SB
8	9	Sean Penalver	Gibraltar	11.87	SB
				Wind: (−0.6 m/s)	

==== Heat 3 ====
Place	Lane	Athlete	Nation	Time	Notes
1	7	Kuron Griffith	Barbados	10.47	Q
2	6	Alieu Joof	Gambia	10.60	Q
3	5	Favoris Muzrapov	Tajikistan	10.67	q
4	4	Hassan Saaid	Maldives	10.84	q
5	3	Kenaz Kaniwete	Kiribati	11.10	
6	9	Gregorio Ndong	Equatorial Guinea	11.48	PB
7	2	Manuel Ataide	Timor-Leste	11.59	SB
8	8	Theodore Cleveland Rodgers	Northern Mariana Islands	12.13	
				Wind: (−0.5 m/s)	

=== Round 1 (heats) ===
Round 1 took place on 13 September. The first three athletes in each heat ( Q ) and the next three fastest ( q ) qualified for the semi-finals.

==== Heat 1 ====
Place	Lane	Athlete	Nation	Time	Notes
1	4	Gift Leotlela	South Africa	9.87	Q, PB
2	7	Kayinsola Ajayi	Nigeria	9.88	Q, PB
3	6	Oblique Seville	Jamaica	9.93	Q
4	5	Romell Glave	Great Britain & N.I.	10.00	q, =PB
5	9	Zhenye Xie	China	10.21	=SB
6	3	Taymir Burnet	Netherlands	10.21	
7	8	Mamadou Fall Sarr	Senegal	10.25	
8	2	Zaid Ashraf Omar Al-Awamleh	Jordan	10.46	=SB
				Wind: (+0.3 m/s)	

==== Heat 2 ====
Place	Lane	Athlete	Nation	Time	Notes
1	5	Kishane Thompson	Jamaica	9.95	Q
2	3	Eliezer Adjibi	Canada	10.19	Q
3	6	Ronal Longa	Colombia	10.21	Q
4	8	Henrik Larsson	Sweden	10.22 [.216]	
5	2	Simon Hansen	Denmark	10.22 [.218]	
6	4	Eloy Benitez	Puerto Rico	10.23	
7	7	Yuhi Mori	Japan	10.37	
8	9	Hassan Saaid	Maldives	10.81	SB
				Wind: (+0.1 m/s)	

==== Heat 3 ====
Place	Lane	Athlete	Nation	Time	Notes
1	5	Noah Lyles	United States	9.95	Q
2	7	Ackeem Blake	Jamaica	10.07	Q
3	8	Terrence Jones	Bahamas	10.16	Q
4	3	Ali Al-Balushi	Oman	10.25	
5	6	Yoshihide Kiryu	Japan	10.28	
6	2	Christopher Borzor	Haiti	10.36	
7	9	Kuron Griffith	Barbados	10.40	
8	4	Felipe Bardi	Brazil	10.54	
				Wind: (−1.1 m/s)	

==== Heat 4 ====
Place	Lane	Athlete	Nation	Time	Notes
1	6	Kenneth Bednarek	United States	10.01	Q
2	5	Jerome Blake	Canada	10.05	Q
3	4	Jeremiah Azu	Great Britain & N.I.	10.10	Q
4	9	Puripol Boonson	Thailand	10.15	q
5	3	Rohan Browning	Australia	10.16	
6	8	Owen Ansah	Germany	10.21	
7	7	Carlos Flórez	Colombia	10.42	
8	2	Favoris Muzrapov	Tajikistan	10.70	
				Wind: (−0.8 m/s)	

==== Heat 5 ====
Place	Lane	Athlete	Nation	Time	Notes
1	8	Letsile Tebogo	Botswana	10.07	Q
2	2	Andre De Grasse	Canada	10.16	Q
3	5	Courtney Lindsey	United States	10.19	Q
4	3	Rikkoi Brathwaite	British Virgin Islands	10.23	
5	7	Lucas Ansah-Peprah	Germany	10.25	
6	6	Benjamin Azamati	Ghana	10.30	
7	4	Erik Cardoso	Brazil	10.32	
8	9	Dylan Sicobo	Seychelles	10.85	
				Wind: (−1.2 m/s)	

==== Heat 6 ====
Place	Lane	Athlete	Nation	Time	Notes
1	3	Israel Okon	Nigeria	10.04	Q
2	7	Zharnel Hughes	Great Britain & N.I.	10.06	Q
3	2	Lamont Marcel Jacobs	Italy	10.20	Q
4	5	T'Mars McCallum	United States	10.25	
5	4	Davonte Howell	Cayman Islands	10.33	
6	8	Joshua Azzopardi	Australia	10.41	
7	6	Retshidisitswe Mlenga	South Africa	10.42	
8	9	Alieu Joof	Gambia	10.54	
				Wind: (−0.6 m/s)	

==== Heat 7 ====
Place	Lane	Athlete	Nation	Time	Notes
1	4	Akani Simbine	South Africa	10.02	Q
2	7	Abdul-Rasheed Saminu	Ghana	10.09	Q
3	6	Ferdinand Omanyala	Kenya	10.12	Q
4	8	Elvis Afrifa	Netherlands	10.15	q
5	3	Xinrui Deng	China	10.23	
6	5	Emmanuel Eseme	Cameroon	10.24	
7	9	Abdul Hakim Sani Brown	Japan	10.37	
8	2	Saif Al-Rammahi	Iraq	10.58	
				Wind: (±0.0 m/s)	

=== Semi-finals ===
The semi-finals took place on 14 September. The first two athletes in each heat ( Q ) and the next two fastest ( q ) qualified for the final.

==== Heat 1 ====
Place	Lane	Athlete	Nation	Time	Notes
1	5	Noah Lyles	United States	9.92	Q
2	7	Kayinsola Ajayi	Nigeria	9.93	Q
3	6	Akani Simbine	South Africa	9.96	q
4	8	Jeremiah Azu	Great Britain & N.I.	10.05	
5	4	Ackeem Blake	Jamaica	10.12	
6	2	Lamont Marcel Jacobs	Italy	10.16	SB
7	9	Elvis Afrifa	Netherlands	10.20	
8	3	Eliezer Adjibi	Canada	10.27	
				Wind: (+0.1 m/s)	

==== Heat 2 ====
Place	Lane	Athlete	Nation	Time	Notes
1	4	Kenneth Bednarek	United States	9.85 [.844]	Q
1	5	Kishane Thompson	Jamaica	9.85 [.844]	Q
3	6	Zharnel Hughes	Great Britain & N.I.	10.03 [.022]	
3	7	Jerome Blake	Canada	10.03 [.022]	
5	3	Ferdinand Omanyala	Kenya	10.09	
6	8	Terrence Jones	Bahamas	10.10	
7	9	Puripol Boonson	Thailand	10.17	
8	2	Ronal Longa	Colombia	10.23	
				Wind: (+0.2 m/s)	

==== Heat 3 ====
Place	Lane	Athlete	Nation	Time	Notes
1	8	Oblique Seville	Jamaica	9.86	Q
2	5	Letsile Tebogo	Botswana	9.94	Q, SB
3	4	Gift Leotlela	South Africa	9.97	q
4	6	Abdul-Rasheed Saminu	Ghana	10.08	
5	3	Andre De Grasse	Canada	10.09 [.084]	
6	2	Romell Glave	Great Britain & N.I.	10.09 [.089]	
7	7	Israel Okon	Nigeria	10.14	
8	9	Courtney Lindsey	United States	10.18	
				Wind: (±0.0 m/s)	

=== Final ===
Place	Lane	Athlete	Nation	Time	Notes
1st place, gold medalist(s)	7	Oblique Seville	Jamaica	9.77	PB
2nd place, silver medalist(s)	5	Kishane Thompson	Jamaica	9.82	
3rd place, bronze medalist(s)	4	Noah Lyles	United States	9.89	SB
4	6	Kenneth Bednarek	United States	9.92	
5	9	Gift Leotlela	South Africa	9.95	
6	3	Kayinsola Ajayi	Nigeria	10.00	
7	2	Akani Simbine	South Africa	10.04	
—	8	Letsile Tebogo	Botswana	DQ	TR 16.8
				Wind: (+0.3 m/s)	
