= Jordan at the 2023 World Athletics Championships =

- Flag of Jordan
- WA code: JOR

in Budapest, Hungary 19 August 2023 – 27 August 2023
- Competitors: 1 (1 man and 0 women)
- Medals: Gold 0 Silver 0 Bronze 0 Total 0

World Athletics Championships appearances
- 1983; 1987; 1991; 1993; 1995; 1997; 1999; 2001; 2003; 2005; 2007; 2009; 2011; 2013; 2015; 2017; 2019; 2022; 2023; 2025

Jordan competed at the 2023 World Athletics Championships in Budapest, Hungary, which were held from 19 to 27 August 2023. The athlete delegation of the country was composed of one competitor, long-distance runner Moath Alkhawaldeh who competed in the men's marathon. He qualified for the Championships upon being selected by the Jordan Athletics Federation. In the event, he placed 51st overall and set a new season's best.

== Background ==
The 2023 World Athletics Championships in Budapest, Hungary, were held from 19 to 27 August 2023. The Championships were held at the National Athletics Centre. To qualify for the World Championships, athletes had to reach an entry standard (e.g. time or distance), place in a specific position at select competitions, be a wild card entry, or qualify through their World Athletics Ranking at the end of the qualification period.

As Jordan did not meet any of the four standards, they could send either one male or one female athlete in one event of the Championships who has not yet qualified. The Jordan Athletics Federation selected long-distance runner Moath Alkhawaldeh who held a personal best of 2:18:43 in the marathon and was ranked 1294th in the World Athletics Rankings. This edition of the Championships was Alkhawaldeh's first time competing in an international athletics competition.

== Results ==
Key

- Q = Qualified for the next round
- q = Qualified for the next round as a fastest loser or, in field events, by position without achieving the qualifying target
- NR = National record
- PB = Personal best
- SB = Season best
- N/A = Round not applicable for the event

=== Men ===
Alkhawaldeh competed in the men's marathon on 27 August against 84 other long-distance runners. There, he recorded a time of 2:22:33 and placed 51st out of the 59 long-distance runners that have completed the race. His time set a new season's best.

Track and road events

Athlete	Event	Final	
Athlete	Event	Result	Rank
Moath Alkhawaldeh	Marathon	2:22:33 SB	52
