= Israel Okon =

Nigerian sprinter (born 2006)

Israel Okon Sunday
Personal information
- Nationality: Nigerian
- Born: 11 November 2006 (age 19)
- Height: 183 cm (6 ft 0 in)

Sport
- Sport: Track and Field
- Event: Sprint

Achievements and titles
- Personal bests: 60m: 6.48 (Fayetteville, 2026); 100m: 9.99 (Lexington, 2026) NU20R; 200m: 19.94 (Lexington, 2026)
Medal record
Men's athletics
Representing Nigeria
African Games
Gold medal – first place	2023 Accra	4x100 m relay

Israel Okon Sunday (born 11 November 2006) is a Nigerian sprinter.

== Biography ==
In February 2024, he ran 10.20 seconds for the 100 metres as a 17 year-old to win the Athletics Federation of Nigeria (AFN) African Games National Trials in Asaba. He was a gold medalist in the 4x100m relay at the delayed 2023 African Games in March 2024.

He ran a personal best 20.80 seconds to win the Nigerian Olympic Trials over 200 metres in June 2024. He competed at the 2024 World Athletics U20 Championships in Lima, Peru in August 2024 where he reached the semi-finals of the 100 metres but had to pull out with injury.

From 2025, he began competing for the University of Auburn in the United States. He equalled the world under-20 record for 60 metres running 6.51 seconds at the Southeastern Conference Indoor Track & Field Championships in Texas on 1 March 2025. This also broke the African under-20 record set by Joshua Caleb that year. He ran 6.52 seconds to finish third in the men’s 60m at the 2025 NCAA Indoor Championships in Virginia Beach.

In September 2025, he was a semi-finalist in the 100 metres at the 2025 World Championships in Tokyo, Japan.

In March 2026, he placed fifth in the 60 m at the 2026 NCAA Indoor Championships in 6.57 seconds. Competing at the NCAA East Regional in Lexington, Kentucky on 29 May, he ran a personal best 19.94 seconds for the 200 metres and 9.99 seconds for the 100 metres to qualify in both events for the 2026 NCAA national championships. On 12 June, he placed second to Jaiden Reid in the 200 metres final at the 2026 NCAA Outdoor Championships, running 19.99 seconds.

While he was scheduled to compete at the 2026 Commonwealth Games in Glasgow, Okon withdrew due to a hamstring injury.

== National titles ==
- 100m - Gold, 10.04 - (Abeokuta, 2025)
- 200m - Gold, 20.80 - (Benin City, 2024)
