= Jordan at the 2013 World Aquatics Championships =

- Flag of Jordan
- FINA code: JOR
- National federation: Jordan Swimming Federation
- Website: www.jsf.com.jo/en_home.asp

in Barcelona, Spain
- Competitors: 3 in 1 sports
- Medals: Gold 0 Silver 0 Bronze 0 Total 0

World Aquatics Championships appearances
- 1973; 1975; 1978; 1982; 1986; 1991; 1994; 1998; 2001; 2003; 2005; 2007; 2009; 2011; 2013; 2015; 2017; 2019; 2022; 2023; 2024

Jordan competed at the 2013 World Aquatics Championships in Barcelona, Spain between 19 July and 4 August 2013.

== Swimming ==
Jordanian swimmers achieved qualifying standards in the following events (up to a maximum of 2 swimmers in each event at the A-standard entry time, and 1 at the B-standard):

Men

Athlete	Event	Heat		Semifinal		Final	
Athlete	Event	Time	Rank	Time	Rank	Time	Rank
Khader Baqleh	200 m freestyle	1:56.94	55	did not advance			
Khader Baqleh	800 m freestyle	8:43.13	33	—		did not advance	
Awse Ma'aya	100 m backstroke	59.75	41	did not advance			

Women

Athlete	Event	Heat		Semifinal		Final	
Athlete	Event	Time	Rank	Time	Rank	Time	Rank
Mira Shami	50 m butterfly	30.42	48	did not advance			

== See also ==
Jordan at other World Championships in 2013

- Jordan at the 2013 UCI Road World Championships
- Jordan at the 2013 World Championships in Athletics
