= Maldives at the 2023 World Athletics Championships =

- Flag of Maldives
- WA code: MDV

in Budapest, Hungary 19 August 2023 – 27 August 2023
- Competitors: 1 (1 man and 0 women)
- Medals: Gold 0 Silver 0 Bronze 0 Total 0

World Athletics Championships appearances
- 1987; 1991; 1993; 1995; 1997; 1999; 2001; 2003; 2005; 2007; 2009; 2011; 2013; 2015; 2017; 2019; 2022; 2023; 2025

The Maldives competed at the 2023 World Athletics Championships in Budapest, Hungary, which were held from 19 to 27 August 2023. The athlete delegation of the country was composed of one competitor, sprinter Nujoom Hassan who competed in the men's 100 metres. He qualified for the Championships upon being selected by the Athletics Association of Maldives. In the preliminary round, Hassan placed fourth and set a new personal best, failing to advance further.

== Background ==
The 2023 World Athletics Championships in Budapest, Hungary, were held from 19 to 27 August 2023. The Championships were held at the National Athletics Centre. To qualify for the World Championships, athletes had to reach an entry standard (e.g. time or distance), place in a specific position at select competitions, be a wild card entry, or qualify through their World Athletics Ranking at the end of the qualification period.

As the Maldives did not meet any of the four standards, they could send either one male or one female athlete in one event of the Championships who has not yet qualified. The Athletics Association of Maldives selected sprinter Nujoom Hassan, who would compete in the men's 100 metres. In the entry list for the Championships, he held no personal best nor a World Athletics Ranking. His last World Athletics-ratified competition before these Championships was the 2021 Maldives Championships.

== Results ==
Key

- Q = Qualified for the next round
- q = Qualified for the next round as a fastest loser or, in field events, by position without achieving the qualifying target
- NR = National record
- PB = Personal best
- SB = Season best
- N/A = Round not applicable for the event

=== Men ===
Hassan competed in the fourth preliminary heat on 19 August against six other sprinters. There, he recorded a time of 11.30 seconds and set a new personal best, placing fourth. Though, he failed to advance as he was not within the top two of his heat nor was he one of the two next fastest athletes.

Track and road events

Athlete	Event	Preliminary		Heat		Semifinal		Final	
Athlete	Event	Result	Rank	Result	Rank	Result	Rank	Result	Rank
Nujoom Hassan	100 metres	11.30 PB	4	Did not advance					
