= Iraq at the 2023 World Athletics Championships =

- Flag of Iraq
- WA code: IRQ

in Budapest, Hungary 19 August 2023 – 27 August 2023
- Competitors: 1 (1 man and 0 women)
- Medals: Gold 0 Silver 0 Bronze 0 Total 0

World Athletics Championships appearances
- 1983; 1987–1995; 1997; 1999; 2001–2005; 2007; 2009; 2011; 2013; 2015; 2017; 2019; 2022; 2023; 2025

Iraq competed at the 2023 World Athletics Championships in Budapest, Hungary, which were held from 19 to 27 August 2023. The athlete delegation of the country was composed of one competitor, sprinter Taha Hussein Yaseen who competed in the men's 200 metres. He qualified for the Championships upon being selected by the Iraqi Amateur Athletic Federation. In the first round heats, he placed sixth and failed to advance further.

== Background ==
The 2023 World Athletics Championships in Budapest, Hungary, were held from 19 to 27 August 2023. The Championships were held at the National Athletics Centre. To qualify for the World Championships, athletes had to reach an entry standard (e.g. time or distance), place in a specific position at select competitions, be a wild card entry, or qualify through their World Athletics Ranking at the end of the qualification period.

As Iraq did not meet any of the four standards, they could send either one male or one female athlete in one event of the Championships who has not yet qualified. The Iraqi Amateur Athletic Federation selected sprinter Taha Hussein Yaseen, who would compete in the men's 200 metres. In the entry list for the Championships, he held a personal and season's best of 20.89 seconds and ranked 303rd in the World Athletics Rankings.

== Results ==
Key

- Q = Qualified for the next round
- q = Qualified for the next round as a fastest loser or, in field events, by position without achieving the qualifying target
- NR = National record
- PB = Personal best
- SB = Season best
- N/A = Round not applicable for the event

=== Men ===
Yaseen competed in the seventh first round heat on 23 August against seven other sprinters. There, he recorded a time of 21.01 seconds and placed sixth, failing to advance further as he was not within the top three of his heat nor was he one of the three next fastest sprinters outside of the top three of their respective heats.

Track and road events

Athlete	Event	Heat		Semifinal		Final	
Athlete	Event	Result	Rank	Result	Rank	Result	Rank
Taha Hussein Yaseen	200 metres	21.01	6	Did not advance			
