= Athletics at the 2024 Summer Olympics – Men's 100 metres =

Men's 100 metres at the Games of the XXXIII Olympiad
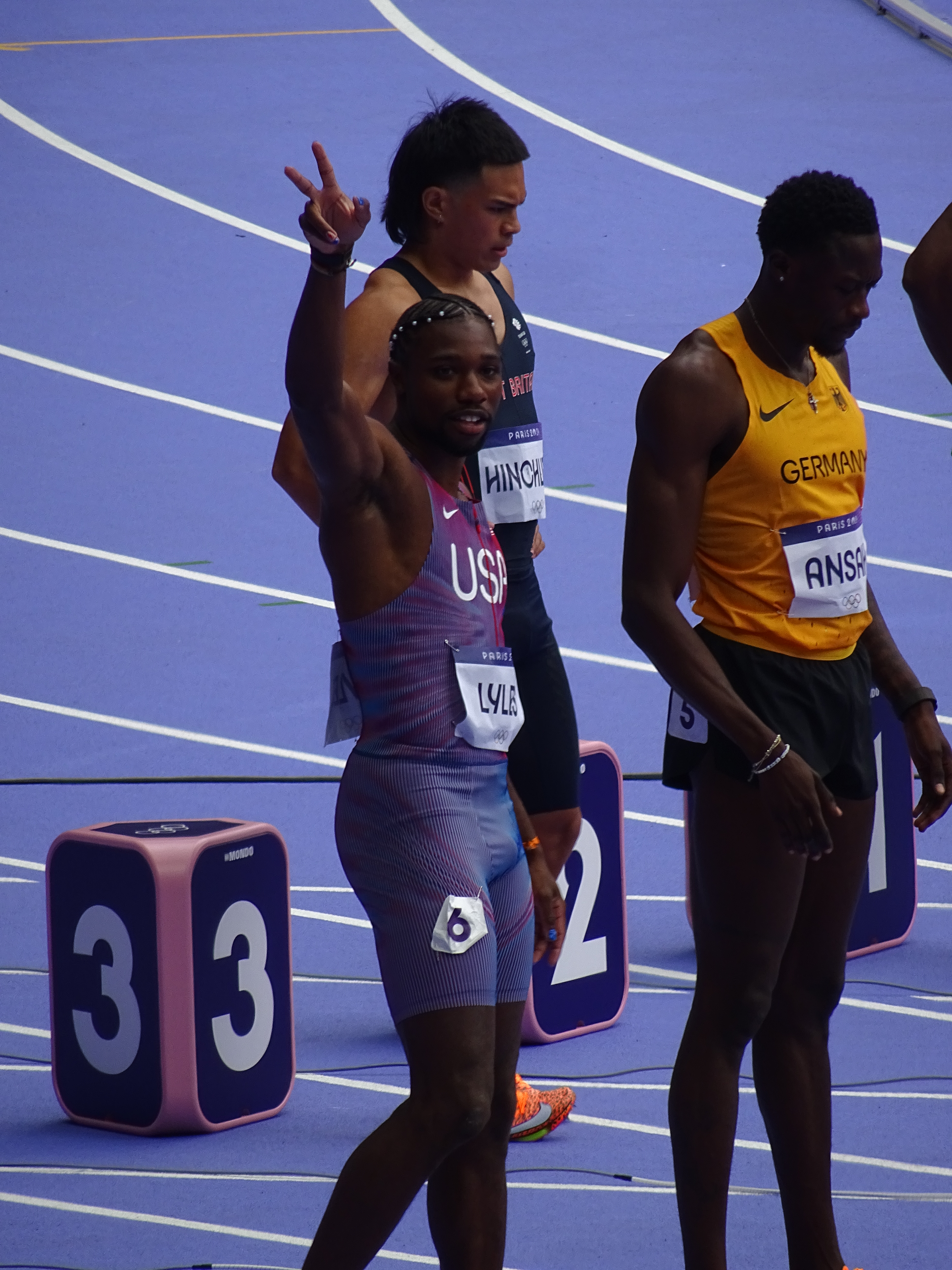
- Gold medallist Noah Lyles at the start of his first-round race
- Venue: Stade de France, Paris, France
- Dates: 3 August 2024 (preliminary round); 3 August 2024 (round 1); 4 August 2024 (semi-finals); 4 August 2024 (final)
- Competitors: 102 from 81 nations
- Winning time: 9.784

Medalists
1st place, gold medalist(s)		Noah Lyles	United States
2nd place, silver medalist(s)		Kishane Thompson	Jamaica
3rd place, bronze medalist(s)		Fred Kerley	United States

Official Video

The men's 100 metres event at the 2024 Summer Olympics took place on 3 August and 4 August at the Stade de France in Paris. Noah Lyles won the gold medal, setting a new personal best in the 100m and giving the United States its first victory in the event since 2004. Jamaican Kishane Thompson finished in second, taking the silver medal. The winning time of 9.79 was achieved by both Lyles and Thompson, but Lyles crossed the line 5 ms sooner to take gold. Lyles' teammate Fred Kerley finished third in 9.81, winning bronze.

== Summary ==
This was the thirtieth time that the men's 100 metres was contested at the Summer Olympics. Interestingly, the final contained 6 men who had recorded top-25 all-time records in the 100m, making this final one of the most tightly contested in history, as the difference between the fastest man in the field Fred Kerley (9.76) and the slowest Kenny Bednarek (9.87) was only 0.11 seconds. For the first time in 100m history, the final was contested by 8 men who had all run under 10 seconds in the semi-finals. In fact, 12 of the 27 semi-finalists all ran under 10 seconds, with the gap between 8th-placed semi-finalist Kenny Bednarek and 12th-placed Andre De Grasse being just 0.05 seconds.

Noah Lyles came through in 1st place, 0.005 seconds ahead of 2nd-placed Kishane Thompson, marking possibly one of the closest 1–2 finishes in Olympic 100-metre history. Both recorded times of 9.79; however, Lyles' time was 9.784, while Thompson's time was 9.789. Lyles had a slow start out of the blocks and, up until the 85-meter mark, was out of medal contention. Thompson was ahead for the entire race until the final inches of the race, where Lyles ran through.

During the final, Kishane Thompson was in lane 4 as the fastest qualifier with a time of 9.80 (he was also the fastest man in the world, this year). Lanes 6 and 7 contained Oblique Seville and Noah Lyles, respectively. These two men had competed in one of the semi-final heats, with Seville besting Lyles with a time of 9.81 to Lyles' 9.83. Fred Kerley, who won silver at the 2020 Summer Olympics was in lane 3 as the 4th fastest qualifier with a time of 9.84.

Places 5 to 8 ran the fastest times in history for those respective places. The time gap between 1st and 8th was only 0.12 seconds, which is the closest and overall fastest 100m race in history, and the first time in history that the entire field broke the 10-second barrier in a competitive race.

Fred Kerley finished with a season's best time taking 3rd place by just 0.01 ahead of Akani Simbine, who set a new national record for South Africa with a time of 9.82, bettering his time from the 2020 Olympics where he also finished 4th. Marcell Jacobs who was the gold medal winner in the 2020 Olympic 100 metres champion, finished 5th with a time of 9.85 which was also a season's best time for him. In 6th was Letsile Tebogo (who broke the 300 metres world record in February) also set a national record for Botswana with this time 9.86.

Kerley’s time of 9.81 was also the fastest time in history for any man who didn't finish either 1st/2nd in a final or didn't win their semi-final race. Noticeably absent in the final was Ferdinand Omanyala who had set the 2nd fastest time of 2024 just 6 weeks prior in June

Lyles' win was the first American gold medal in the 100m race since Justin Gatlin won in 2004. Lyles also set a seasons best and personal best with his winning time. The race was so close, Leigh Diffey calling the race for American NBC Sports declared Jamaican Kishane Thompson the winner, missing the American Noah Lyles.

The top 6 all ran times that would have guaranteed a gold, silver or bronze in every single Olympic 100m race prior (except for 2012). In fact, 6th-placed Letsile Tebogo's time of 9.86 would have won silver in each 100m Olympics apart from 2012 and 2020.

== Background ==
The men's 100 metres has been present on the Olympic athletics programme since 1896. The 100 metres is considered one of the blue ribbon events of the Olympics and is among the highest profile competitions at the games. It is the most prestigious 100 metres race at an elite level and is the shortest sprinting competition at the Olympics – a position it has held at every edition except for a brief period between 1900 and 1904, when a men's 60 metres was contested.

The 2024 season began with lower-than-average times, compared to other years. The top time in the world in April was 9.93 by 17 year old American high school runner Christian Miller, while elite races like the Diamond League were being won in times slower than 10 seconds. In June the times were noticeably faster. Season leaders were Kishane Thompson with 9.77, Ferdinand Omanyala 9.79, reigning World Champion Noah Lyles 9.80 and Oblique Seville 9.82. The podium from three years earlier all returned, defending champion Marcell Jacobs, Fred Kerley and Andre De Grasse.

Global records before the 2024 Summer Olympics
Record	Athlete (nation)	Time (s)	Location	Date
World record	Usain Bolt (JAM)	9.58	Berlin, Germany	16 August 2009
Olympic record	Usain Bolt (JAM)	9.63	London, United Kingdom	5 August 2012
World leading	Kishane Thompson (JAM)	9.77	Kingston, Jamaica	28 June 2024

Area records before the 2024 Summer Olympics
Area record	Athlete (nation)	Time (s)
North, Central America and Caribbean (records)	Usain Bolt (JAM)	9.58 WR
Africa (records)	Ferdinand Omanyala (KEN)	9.77
Europe (records)	Marcell Jacobs (ITA)	9.80
Asia (records)	Su Bingtian (CHN)	9.83
Oceania (records)	Patrick Johnson (AUS)	9.93
South America (records)	Felipe Bardi (BRA)	9.96

== Competition format ==
The event continued to use the preliminaries plus three main rounds format introduced in 2012. Athletes not meeting the qualification standard (that is, were entered through universality places) competed in the preliminaries; those who met the standard started in the first round. The 100 metres did not use the new repechage rounds introduced for other races in 2024, as there were already four rounds due to the preliminaries.

For the preliminary round, the top 2 in each of the 6 heats plus the next 4 fastest overall advanced to the first round, joining the automatic qualifiers. In the first round, the top 3 in each of the 8 heats plus the next 3 fastest overall advanced to the semi-finals (making 27 overall semi-finalists). The top 2 in each of the 3 semi-finals, plus the next 2 fastest overall, were the 8 finalists.

== Qualification ==
For the men's 100 metres event, the qualification period was between 1 July 2023 and 30 June 2024. 56 athletes were able to qualify for the event, with a maximum of three athletes per nation, by running the entry standard of 10.00 seconds or faster or by their World Athletics Ranking for this event. Additionally, universality places were given to NOCs that hadn't qualified athletes in any other event.

== Results ==
=== Preliminaries ===
The preliminary round was held on 3 August, starting at 10:35 (UTC+2) in the morning. Unlike other events from 200 metres to 1500 metres, no 'repechage' round was included in the 100 metres. Instead, a preliminary round for athletes with slower qualification times preceded the first round. The 56 athletes qualified to enter the event through achieving the qualifying standard or through ranking skipped this round. The 46 athletes entered through universality or invitational places competed.

Qualification Rules: First 2 in each heat (Q) and the best 4 of remaining athletes (q) advance to Round 1.

==== Heat 1 ====
Rank	Lane	Athlete	Nation	Time	Notes
1	2	Ebrahima Camara	The Gambia	10.29	Q
2	3	Muhd Azeem Fahmi	Malaysia	10.42	Q
3	4	Marc Brian Louis	Singapore	10.43	q
4	5	Sha Mahmood Noor Zahi	Afghanistan	10.64	NR
5	6	Seco Camara	Guinea-Bissau	10.76	
6	7	William Reed	Marshall Islands	11.29	PB
7	8	Karalo Maibuca	Tuvalu	11.30	NR
				Wind: +0.6 m/s	

==== Heat 2 ====
Rank	Lane	Athlete	Nation	Time	Notes
1	2	Davonte Howell	Cayman Islands	10.31	Q
2	4	Sibusiso Matsenjwa	Eswatini	10.39	Q
3	6	Didier Kiki	Benin	10.76 (.755)	
4	5	Hervé Toumandji	Central African Republic	10.76 (.760)	
5	7	Kenaz Kaniwete	Kiribati	11.29	PB
6	8	Darko Pešić	Montenegro	11.85	
—	3	Steven Sabino	Mozambique	DQ	TR 16.8
				Wind: -0.3 m/s	

==== Heat 3 ====
Rank	Lane	Athlete	Nation	Time	Notes
1	2	Noa Bibi	Mauritius	10.27	Q
2	5	Franko Burraj	Albania	10.60 (.596)	Q, PB
3	4	Favoris Muzrapov	Tajikistan	10.60 (.597)	
4	3	Diu Chun Hei	Hong Kong	10.62	
5	6	Melique García	Honduras	10.76	
6	7	Rija Gardiner	Madagascar	10.82	PB
7	9	Manuel Ataide	Timor-Leste	11.35	NR
8	8	Samer Al-Yafaee	Yemen	11.54	PB
				Wind: +0.1 m/s	

==== Heat 4 ====
Rank	Lane	Athlete	Nation	Time	Notes
1	2	Christopher Borzor	Haiti	10.26	Q
2	4	Marcos Santos	Angola	10.31	Q, NR
3	3	Hachim Maaroufou	Comoros	10.44	q
4	9	Taha Hussein Yaseen	Iraq	10.51	q, PB
5	5	Ibadulla Adam	Maldives	10.55	PB
6	6	Shaun Gill	Belize	11.17	
7	8	Scott Fiti	Federated States of Micronesia	11.61	SB
8	7	Ahmed Essabai	Libya	11.89	
				Wind: +0.2 m/s	

==== Heat 5 ====
Rank	Lane	Athlete	Nation	Time	Notes
1	3	Naquille Harris	Saint Kitts and Nevis	10.33	Q
2	2	Lalu Muhammad Zohri	Indonesia	10.35	Q
3	4	Fodé Sissoko	Mali	10.66	
4	7	Joseph Green	Guam	10.85	SB
5	6	Winzar Kakiouea	Nauru	11.15	
6	9	Remigio Santander	Equatorial Guinea	11.65	SB
7	8	Maleselo Fukofuka	Tonga	12.11	PB
—	5	Dominique Mulamba	Democratic Republic of the Congo	~~10.54~~ DQ	~~q, SB~~
				Wind: -0.4 m/s	

On 11 August 2024, Mulamba was issued with a provisional suspension (due to an Adverse Analytical Finding) and was disqualified from the Men’s 100m according to Anti-doping Rule 10.1.

==== Heat 6 ====
Rank	Lane	Athlete	Nation	Time	Notes
1	2	Arturo Deliser	Panama	10.34	Q
2	4	Dylan Sicobo	Seychelles	10.51	Q
3	5	Wissy Hoye	Gabon	10.59	
4	7	Jalen Lisse	Suriname	10.64	PB
5	3	Beppe Grillo	Malta	10.69	
6	8	Imranur Rahman	Bangladesh	10.73 (.727)	SB
7	6	Waisake Tewa	Fiji	10.73 (.729)	SB
8	9	Muhd Noor Firdaus Ar-Rasyid	Brunei	10.86	SB
				Wind: +0.3 m/s	

=== First round ===
Round 1 was held on 3 August, starting at 11:45 (UTC+2) in the morning.

==== Heat 1 ====
Rank	Lane	Athlete	Nation	Time	Notes
1	5	Kishane Thompson	Jamaica	10.00	Q
2	6	Benjamin Azamati	Ghana	10.08	Q
3	1	Reynaldo Espinosa	Cuba	10.11	Q
4	2	Felipe Bardi	Brazil	10.18	
5	9	Akihiro Higashida	Japan	10.19	
6	3	Lalu Muhammad Zohri	Indonesia	10.26	
7	8	Kayhan Özer	Turkey	10.34	
8	7	Sibusiso Matsenjwa	Eswatini	10.39	
	4	Jeremiah Azu	Great Britain	DQ	TR 16.8
				Wind: +0.6 m/s	

==== Heat 2 ====
Rank	Lane	Athlete	Nation	Time	Notes
1	2	Ferdinand Omanyala	Kenya	10.08	Q
2	1	Chituru Ali	Italy	10.12	Q
3	7	Joshua Hartmann	Germany	10.16	Q
4	4	Joshua Azzopardi	Australia	10.20	
5	6	Devin Augustine	Trinidad and Tobago	10.31	
6	9	Erik Cardoso	Brazil	10.35 (.344)	
7	3	Arturo Deliser	Panama	10.35 (.347)	
8	5	Jhonny Rentería	Colombia	10.38	
9	8	Muhd Azeem Fahmi	Malaysia	10.45	
				Wind: +0.2 m/s	

==== Heat 3 ====
Rank	Lane	Athlete	Nation	Time	Notes
1	3	Louie Hinchliffe	Great Britain	9.98	Q
2	6	Noah Lyles	United States	10.04	Q
3	4	Shaun Maswanganyi	South Africa	10.06	Q
4	7	Xie Zhenye	China	10.16	
5	5	Owen Ansah	Germany	10.22	
6	8	Ali Anwar Al-Balushi	Oman	10.26	
7	1	Naquille Harris	Saint Kitts and Nevis	10.38	
8	2	Markus Fuchs	Austria	10.59	
9	9	Dylan Sicobo	Seychelles	10.62	
				Wind: -0.2 m/s	

==== Heat 4 ====
Rank	Lane	Athlete	Nation	Time	Notes
1	6	Oblique Seville	Jamaica	9.99	Q
2	4	Abdul Hakim Sani Brown	Japan	10.02	Q
3	2	Puripol Boonson	Thailand	10.13	Q
4	3	Favour Ashe	Nigeria	10.16	q
5	5	Duan Asemota	Canada	10.17	
6	7	Terrence Jones	Bahamas	10.31	
7	1	Marcos Santos	Angola	10.40	
8	8	Franko Burraj	Albania	10.66	
9	9	Oliwer Wdowik	Poland	11.53	
				Wind: 0.0 m/s	

==== Heat 5 ====
Rank	Lane	Athlete	Nation	Time	Notes
1	2	Kayinsola Ajayi	Nigeria	10.02	Q
2	4	Marcell Jacobs	Italy	10.05	Q
3	5	Abdul-Rasheed Saminu	Ghana	10.06 (.053)	Q
4	6	Benjamin Richardson	South Africa	10.06 (.060)	q
5	1	Hassan Taftian	Iran	10.18	SB
6	3	Davonte Howell	Cayman Islands	10.24 (.232)	
7	9	Henrik Larsson	Sweden	10.24 (.232)	
8	7	Paulo André de Oliveira	Brazil	10.46	
	8	Marc Brian Louis	Singapore	DNS	
				Wind: -0.3 m/s	

==== Heat 6 ====
Rank	Lane	Athlete	Nation	Time	Notes
1	5	Akani Simbine	South Africa	10.03	Q
2	3	Ackeem Blake	Jamaica	10.06	Q
3	4	Rikkoi Brathwaite	British Virgin Islands	10.13	Q
4	1	Ebrahima Camara	The Gambia	10.21	
5	2	Wanya McCoy	Bahamas	10.24	
6	8	Rohan Browning	Australia	10.29	=SB
7	9	Simon Hansen	Denmark	10.39	
8	6	Emanuel Archibald	Guyana	10.40	
9	7	Hachim Maaroufou	Comoros	10.52	
				Wind: -1.1 m/s	

==== Heat 7 ====
Rank	Lane	Athlete	Nation	Time	Notes
1	2	Kenny Bednarek	United States	9.97	Q
2	1	Emmanuel Eseme	Cameroon	9.98	Q, SB
3	5	Andre De Grasse	Canada	10.07	Q
4	4	Emmanuel Matadi	Liberia	10.08	q
5	6	Ryuichiro Sakai	Japan	10.17	
6	3	Noa Bibi	Mauritius	10.19	
7	7	Ronal Longa	Colombia	10.29	=SB
8	8	José González	Dominican Republic	10.40	
9	9	Taha Hussein Yaseen	Iraq	10.50	PB
				Wind: +0.3 m/s	

==== Heat 8 ====
Rank	Lane	Athlete	Nation	Time	Notes
1	5	Fred Kerley	United States	9.97	Q
2	2	Letsile Tebogo	Botswana	10.01	Q
3	4	Zharnel Hughes	Great Britain	10.03	Q
4	3	Cejhae Greene	Antigua and Barbuda	10.17	
5	1	Christopher Borzor	Haiti	10.28	
6	6	Arthur Cisse	Ivory Coast	10.31	
8	9	Dorian Keletela	Refugee Olympic Team	10.58	
—	7	Aaron Brown	Canada	DQ	TR 16.8
—	8	Dominique Mulamba	Democratic Republic of the Congo	~~10.53~~ DQ	~~SB~~
				Wind: +0.2 m/s	

=== Semi-finals ===
The semi-finals were held on 4 August, starting at 20:00 (UTC+2) in the evening.

==== Heat 1 ====
Rank	Lane	Athlete	Nation	Time	Notes
1	6	Oblique Seville	Jamaica	9.81	Q, PB
2	4	Noah Lyles	United States	9.83	Q
3	5	Louie Hinchliffe	Great Britain	9.97	
4	7	Emmanuel Eseme	Cameroon	10.00	
5	9	Shaun Maswanganyi	South Africa	10.02	SB
6	1	Favour Ashe	Nigeria	10.08	
7	8	Chituru Ali	Italy	10.14	
8	2	Rikkoi Brathwaite	British Virgin Islands	10.15	
9	3	Benjamin Azamati	Ghana	10.17	
				Wind: +0.7 m/s	

==== Heat 2 ====
Rank	Lane	Athlete	Nation	Time	Notes
1	5	Akani Simbine	South Africa	9.87	Q
2	4	Letsile Tebogo	Botswana	9.91	Q
3	8	Marcell Jacobs	Italy	9.92	q, SB
4	7	Kenny Bednarek	United States	9.93	q
5	3	Ackeem Blake	Jamaica	10.06	
6	6	Kayinsola Ajayi	Nigeria	10.13	
7	9	Joshua Hartmann	Germany	10.16	
8	2	Emmanuel Matadi	Liberia	10.18	
9	1	Reynaldo Espinosa	Cuba	10.21	
				Wind: 0.0 m/s	

==== Heat 3 ====
Rank	Lane	Athlete	Nation	Time	Notes
1	4	Kishane Thompson	Jamaica	9.80	Q
2	7	Fred Kerley	United States	9.84	Q
3	9	Benjamin Richardson	South Africa	9.95	
4	5	Abdul Hakim Sani Brown	Japan	9.96	PB
5	2	Andre De Grasse	Canada	9.98	SB
6	3	Zharnel Hughes	Great Britain	10.01	
7	8	Abdul-Rasheed Saminu	Ghana	10.05	
8	6	Ferdinand Omanyala	Kenya	10.08	
9	1	Puripol Boonson	Thailand	10.14	
				Wind: +0.5 m/s	

=== Final ===
The final was held on 4 August, starting at 21:55 (UTC+2) in the evening.

Rank	Lane	Athlete	Nation	Time	Notes
1st place, gold medalist(s)	7	Noah Lyles	United States	9.79 (9.784)	PB
2nd place, silver medalist(s)	4	Kishane Thompson	Jamaica	9.79 (9.789)	
3rd place, bronze medalist(s)	3	Fred Kerley	United States	9.81	SB
4	5	Akani Simbine	South Africa	9.82	NR
5	9	Marcell Jacobs	Italy	9.85	SB
6	8	Letsile Tebogo	Botswana	9.86	NR
7	2	Kenny Bednarek	United States	9.88	
8	6	Oblique Seville	Jamaica	9.91	
				Wind: +1.0 m/s	
