= Brunei at the 2017 World Championships in Athletics =

- WA code: BRU

in London
- Competitors: 1 (1 man) in 1 event
- Medals: Gold 0 Silver 0 Bronze 0 Total 0

World Championships in Athletics appearances
- 1991; 1993; 1995; 1997; 1999; 2001; 2003; 2005; 2007; 2009; 2011; 2013; 2015; 2017; 2019; 2022; 2023

Brunei competed at the 2017 World Championships in Athletics in London, United Kingdom, 4–13 August 2017.

== Results ==
(q – qualified, NM – no mark, SB – season best)

=== Men ===
Track and road events

| Athlete | Event | Heat | | Semifinal | | Final | |
| Athlete | Event | Result | Rank | Result | Rank | Result | Rank |
|---|---|---|---|---|---|---|---|
| Muhd Noor Firadus ar-Rasyid | 200 metres | 22.36 | 45 | Did not advance | | | |
