= Kishane Thompson =

Jamaican athlete (born 2001)

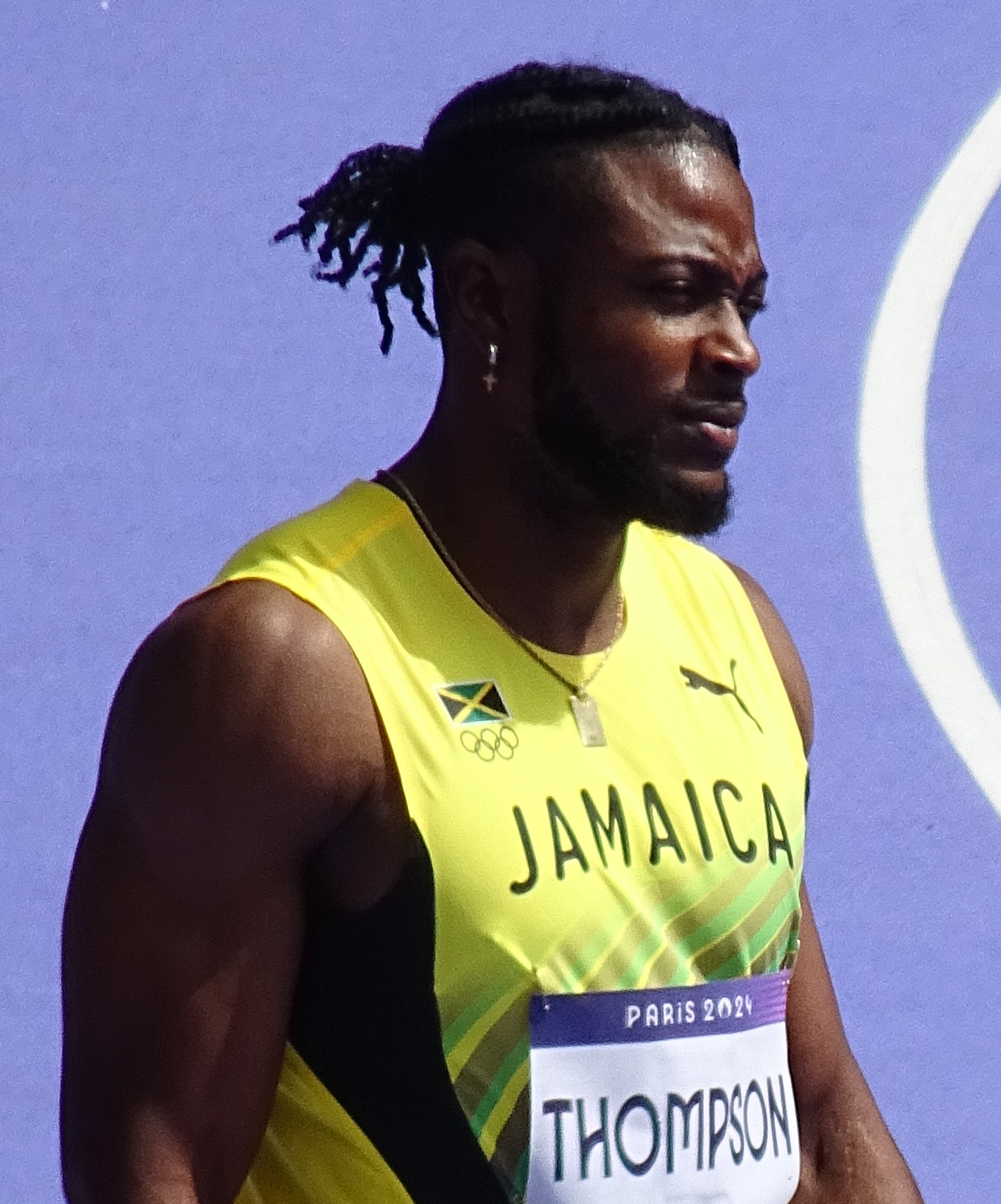
- Thompson at the 2024 Summer Olympics

Personal information
- Born: 17 July 2001 (age 25) Mitchell Town, Jamaica
- Height: 1.85 m (6 ft 1 in)
- Weight: 85 kg (187 lb)

Sport
- Sport: Athletics
- Event: Sprint
- College team: UTECH
- Club: MVP Track & Field Club
- Coached by: Stephen Francis

Achievements and titles
- Personal bests: 60 m: 6.45 s (Toruń, 2026); 100 m: 9.75 s (Kingston, 2025); 150 m: 14.92 s (on curve) (Miramar, 2026); 200 m: 20.92 s (Kingston, 2022)
Medal record
Men's athletics
Representing Jamaica
Olympic Games
Silver medal – second place	2024 Paris	100 m
World Championships
Silver medal – second place	2025 Tokyo	100 m
World Indoor Championships
Silver medal – second place	2026 Toruń	60 m

Kishane Thompson (born 17 July 2001) is a Jamaican track and field sprinter who competes in the 60 metres and 100 metres. He won the silver medal in the 100 metres at the 2024 Summer Olympics and 2025 World Championships, and over 60 metres at the 2026 World Indoor Championships.

== Biography ==
Thompson is from Mitchell Town Clarendon, Jamaica. Initially, he attended Bustamante High School; but he was recruited to Garvey Maceo High School because of his athletic talent, where he honed his skills under the tutelage of coach Neville Myton. He has a twin brother Kishaun who is not a professional athlete.

== Career ==
A member of the MVP Track Club, Thompson competed at the Jamaican Championships in June 2023, and ran 9.91 seconds for the 100 metres in his qualifying heat. However, he pulled-out of the competition prior to the semi-final. This was pre-planned, his coach Stephen Francis explained that due to a number of injuries in previous years he had a schedule to avoid multiple-round running that year.

=== 2023 ===
Thompson made his Diamond League debut competing in the 100 metres in Monaco on 21 July 2023, running 10.04 seconds to finish fifth. In September 2023, he lowered his 100 metres personal best to 9.85 seconds to finish second at the Diamond League event in Xiamen, China. At his last Diamond league match he ran 9.87 seconds to finish fourth in Eugene, Oregon.

=== 2024 ===
On 27 June 2024, he ran 9.82 seconds for the 100 metres in the opening round at the Jamaican Olympic trials in Kingston, Jamaica. In the subsequent final, he ran a new personal best of 9.77 seconds to win the Jamaican national title.

At the 2024 Summer Olympics, Thompson won silver behind Noah Lyles. Thompson and Lyles finished with the exact same time of 9.79 seconds, with Lyles ultimately awarded the gold medal by a margin of five-thousandths of a second after a photo finish.

The close finish led to a heated debate among sports enthusiasts and analysts. Many argued that the race was a "dead heat" and that the gold medal should have been shared between the two athletes since their times were identical. The confusion was further amplified when notable sports broadcasters, including NBC, initially reported that Thompson had won the race.

To his social media fans, he is unofficially known as Hurricane Kishane.

=== 2025 ===
In January 2025, he set a 60 metres personal best of 6.48 seconds at the Central Hurdles, Relays & Field Events Meet at the GC Foster College in St. Catherine. The time places him fifth on the Jamaican all-time list and was recorded into a −2.1 m/s headwind.

He opened his 2025 outdoor season with second place in the 100m at the 2025 Shanghai Diamond League, running a time of 9.99 seconds. He ran 9.88 seconds on 7 June 2025, at the Racers Grand Prix, a World Athletics Continental Tour Silver meeting, in Kingston, Jamaica. At the 2025 Jamaican Athletic Championships, Thompson ran 9.80 seconds (+0.4 m/s) in winning his semi-final and then he won the final in a new personal best of 9.75 seconds (+0.8 m/s), moving him to sixth on the all-time top list. He ran 9.85 seconds to win the 100 metres at the 2025 Prefontaine Classic on 5 July, and 9.87 seconds (+0.3) to win in the Diamond League in Silesia the following month.

At the 2025 World Championships held in Tokyo, he ran 9.82 seconds (+0.3) and won the silver medal in the men's 100 metres, finishing behind his compatriot Oblique Seville and ahead of Noah Lyles.

=== 2026 ===
Thompson ran a personal best 6.46 seconds for the 60 metres (+0.7) at the Gibson McCook Relays in Kingston on 1 March 2026. He won the silver medal representing Jamaica over 60 m at the 2026 World Athletics Indoor Championships in Toruń, Poland on 20 March, finishing runner-up to Jordan Anthony in 6.45 seconds. In Miramar on 4 April, Thompson ran a world best of 14.92 seconds (+1.3) for the 150 metres on the curve, beating the previous best of Linford Christie in 1994, although faster times have been recorded on a straight track.
