= Iraq at the 2019 World Athletics Championships =

Iraq at the 2019 World Championships in Athletics
- WA code: IRQ

in Doha
- Competitors: 1 (1 man)

World Championships in Athletics appearances
- 1983; 1987–1995; 1997; 1999; 2001–2005; 2007; 2009; 2011; 2013; 2015; 2017; 2019; 2022; 2023

Iraq competed at the 2019 World Athletics Championships in Doha, Qatar, from 27 September–6 October 2019.

== Result ==
Key

- Note–Ranks given for track events are for the entire round
- Q = Qualified for the next round
- q = Qualified for the next round as a fastest loser or, in field events, by position without achieving the qualifying target
- NR = National record
- GR = Games record
- PB = Personal best
- SB = Season best
- DNF = Did not finish
- DNS = Did not start
- NM = No mark
- N/A = Round not applicable for the event
- Bye = Athlete not required to compete in round

=== Men ===
Track and road events

| Athlete | Event | Heat | | Semifinal | | Final | |
| Athlete | Event | Result | Rank | Result | Rank | Result | Rank |
|---|---|---|---|---|---|---|---|
| Taha Hussein Yaseen | 400 m | 46.58 | 6 | Did not advance | | | |
