= Brunei at the 2009 World Championships in Athletics =

- WA code: BRU

in Berlin
- Competitors: 1
- Medals: Gold 0 Silver 0 Bronze 0 Total 0

World Championships in Athletics appearances
- 1991; 1993; 1995; 1997; 1999; 2001; 2003; 2005; 2007; 2009; 2011; 2013; 2015; 2017; 2019; 2022; 2023

Brunei competed at the 2009 World Championships in Athletics from 15–23 August in Berlin.

== Team selection ==
Event	Athletes	
Event	Men	Women
100 metres	Mohamed Faisal Ahad	

== Results ==
=== Men ===
Event	Athletes	Heats		Quarterfinals		Semifinal		Final	
Event	Athletes	Result	Rank	Result	Rank	Result	Rank	Result	Rank
100 m	Mohamed Faisal Ahad	11.12 PB	73	did not advance					
