= Joshua Caleb =

Nigerian sprinter (born 2006)

Personal information
- Nationality: Nigerian
- Born: 12 July 2006 (age 19)

Sport
- Sport: Track and Field
- Event: Sprint

Achievements and titles
- Personal best(s): 60m: 6.57 (Reno, 2025); 100m: 10.28 (Ellensburg, 2024); 200m: 20.82 (Spokane, 2025)

Joshua Caleb (born 12 July 2006) is a Nigerian sprinter.

== Career ==
He is from Okrika, Nigeria but began to attend University of Alaska Anchorage in January 2024 as a 17 year-old. During his debut year, he set six school records, and ran a 100 metres personal best of 10.34 seconds, the third-fastest in Great Northeast Athletic Conference (GNAC) outdoor history, and was named the GNAC Male Student-Athlete of the Year and the GNAC Male Freshman of the Year.

He ran 6.57 seconds for the 60 metres at the Nevada Silver & Blue Invitational, breaking the Nigerian record of 6.66 seconds set by Taiwo Ajibade in 2002 and the African U-20 record of 6.58 seconds set by Ibrahim Meite in 1994. The following day, he won the 200 metres race at the meet in a time of 20.86 seconds.

He finished fourth in 6.70 seconds in the men’s 60m final at the NCAA Division II Indoor Championships in Indianapolis in March 2025, having run 6.66 seconds to qualify for the final. He also had a sixth-place finish in the 200 metres in 21.29 seconds.

He was selected for the 60 metres at the 2025 World Athletics Indoor Championships in Nanjing in March 2025.
