= Iraq at the 2022 World Athletics Championships =

- Flag of Iraq
- WA code: IRQ

in Eugene, United States 15 July 2022 – 24 July 2022
- Competitors: 1 (1 man and 0 women)
- Medals: Gold 0 Silver 0 Bronze 0 Total 0

World Athletics Championships appearances
- 1983; 1987–1995; 1997; 1999; 2001–2005; 2007; 2009; 2011; 2013; 2015; 2017; 2019; 2022; 2023

Iraq competed at the 2022 World Athletics Championships in Eugene, United States, from 15 to 24 July 2022. Iraq had entered 1 athlete.

== Results ==
Key

- Q = Qualified for the next round
- q = Qualified for the next round as a fastest loser or, in field events, by position without achieving the qualifying target
- NR = National record
- PB = Personal best
- SB = Season best
- N/A = Round not applicable for the event

=== Men ===
Track and road events

Athlete	Event	Preliminary		Heat		Semi-final		Final	
Athlete	Event	Result	Rank	Result	Rank	Result	Rank	Result	Rank
Hussein Ali Al Khafaji	100 metres	10.65 (+0.0)	8 Q	10.55 (+0.5)	49	Did not advance			
