= Iraq at the 2011 World Championships in Athletics =

- WA code: IRQ
- National federation: Iraqi Athletics Federation

in Daegu
- Competitors: 1
- Medals: Gold 0 Silver 0 Bronze 0 Total 0

World Championships in Athletics appearances
- 1983; 1987–1995; 1997; 1999; 2001–2005; 2007; 2009; 2011; 2013; 2015; 2017; 2019; 2022; 2023

Iraq competed at the 2011 World Championships in Athletics from August 27 to September 4 in Daegu, South Korea.

== Team selection ==
A team of 2 athletes was announced to represent the country in the event.

However, the following athlete appeared on the preliminary Entry List, but not on the Official Start List of the specific event, resulting in the participation of only one competitor:

KEY:	Did not participate	Competed in another event

	Event	Athlete
Men	800 metres	Adnan Taess Akkar

== Results ==
=== Women ===
Athlete	Event	Preliminaries		Heats		Semifinals		Final	
Athlete	Event	Time Width Height	Rank	Time Width Height	Rank	Time Width Height	Rank	Time Width Height	Rank
Alaa Hikmat Al-Qaysi	400 metres			55.62	32	Did not advance			
