= Oblique Seville =

Jamaican sprinter

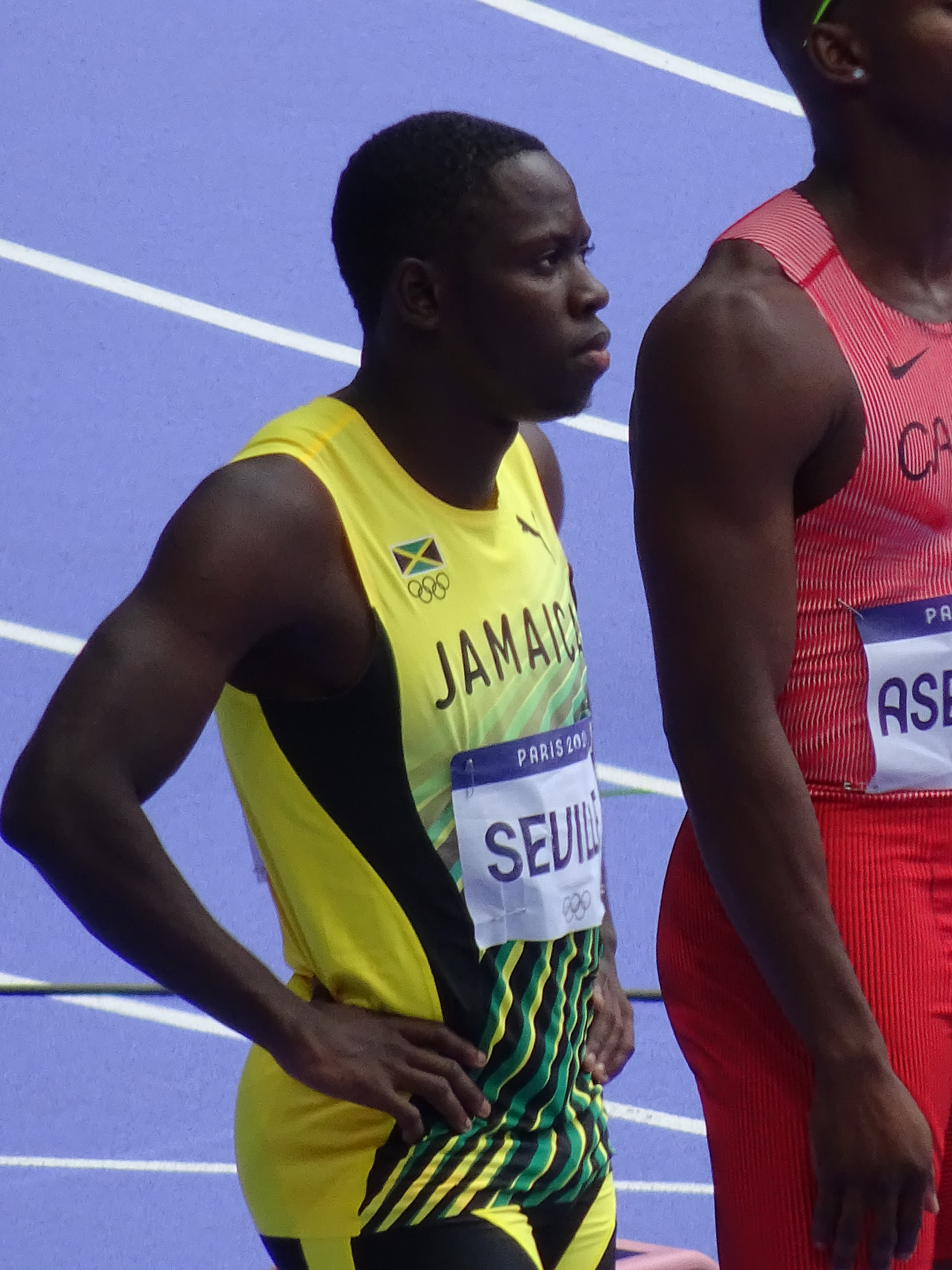
- Seville at the Paris 2024 Olympics

Personal information
- Born: 16 March 2001 (age 25)
- Education: Calabar High School
- Height: 1.70 m (5 ft 7 in)
- Weight: 73 kg (160 lb)

Sport
- Country: Jamaica
- Sport: Athletics
- Events: 100 m, 200 m
- Club: Racers Track Club
- Coached by: Glen Mills

Achievements and titles
- Personal bests: 60 m: 6.42 s NR (Kingston 2023); 100 m: 9.77 s (Tokyo 2025); 200 m: 20.13 s (Miramar 2025); 400 m: 46.98 s (Kingston 2026)
Medal record
Men's athletics
Representing Jamaica
World Championships
| Gold medal – first place | 2025 Tokyo | 100 m |
| Bronze medal – third place | 2023 Budapest | 4 × 100 m relay |
World Ultimate Championship
| Second place | 2026 Budapest | 100 m |
Diamond League
| First place | 2026 Brussels | 100 m |
Pan American U20 Championships
| Silver medal – second place | 2019 San José | 100 m |
| Silver medal – second place | 2019 San José | 4 × 100 m relay |
Carifta Games Junior (U20)
| Gold medal – first place | 2019 George Town | 100 meters |
| Gold medal – first place | 2019 George Town | 4 × 100 meters relay |

Oblique Seville (born 16 March 2001) is a Jamaican track and field sprinter. He won the 2025 World Athletics Championships men's 100 metre sprint, earning his first gold medal. Before that he had finished fourth in the same event at the 2022 and 2023 World Athletics Championships.

== Biography ==
Seville Seville was born and raised in St. Thomas, Jamaica. His cousin is fellow sprinter Ackeem Blake. He attended Holmwood Technical High School in Manchester, Jamaica and Calabar High School in St. Andrew, Jamaica.

== Career ==
=== Early career ===
Seville clocked 10.13s (+1.4) to claim the Class One 100 metres title at the 2019 ISSA Boys and Girls Athletics Championships in Kingston. It was the second fastest time ever in 2019 for this age group in Jamaica. At the 2019 CARIFTA Games in George Town, Cayman Islands, he won the 100 metres in a time of 10.24 s as well as the 4 × 100 metres relay. He also won the 100 m at the Jamaican U20 Championships in Kingston in 10.13 s. He finished second in the 100 m at the 2019 Pan American U20 Championships in San José, Costa Rica in 10.21s and won silver in the 4 × 100 metres relay.

=== 2020-2023 ===
The COVID-19 pandemic prevented him from competing for most of 2020 but Seville impressed again in April 2021 at the Jamaican Olympic Trials qualification, running the fastest 100 m time. At the actual Jamaican Olympic trials in June 2021 for the delayed 2020 Summer Games, he was the fourth fastest with 10.10 seconds. In the final Seville finished third in the 100 m behind Tyquendo Tracey, and Yohan Blake to secure his place at the Olympics.

At the Tokyo Olympics, Seville reached the Olympic semi-finals of the 100 metres in 10.09 (-0.2), and finished 4th in the men's 4 × 100 metres final in 37.84.

He qualified for the 100 m final at the 2022 World Athletics Championships in Eugene, Oregon. In the final, he finished fourth in 9.97 (-0.1).

Seville finished third in the 2023 Jamaican national championships 100 m race, behind surprise winner Rohan Watson. Competing at the 2023 World Athletics Championships in Budapest, he ran the same as his personal best in his first qualifying heat, running 9.86 seconds for the 100 metres. In the final of the 100 m he finished fourth in 9.88 seconds.

=== 2024 ===
In March, he lowered his 200 metres personal best time to 20.17 in Kingston, Jamaica. In May, he ran 19.96 for a straight 200 metres in Atlanta. He ran a personal best and world-leading time of 9.82 seconds to win the Racers Grand Prix in Kingston on 1 June, with Noah Lyles in second place.

In August 2024, at the Paris 2024 Olympics he further improved his 100 m personal best to 9.81 seconds to win his semi-final, before placing eighth in the final.

In December 2024, it was announced that he had signed up for the inaugural season of the Michael Johnson founded Grand Slam Track.

=== 2025 ===
In April, at the Kingston Grand Slam, the inaugural Grand Slam Track meeting, he finished second over 100 metres, running 10.08 seconds (−1.3 m/s). At the second event in Miami, he finished second over 100 metres and third in the 200 metres to finish overall runner-up to Kenny Bednarek in the two-race short sprint category. He improved his 100 m seasons best to 9.97 seconds at the Racers Grand Prix in Kingston, Jamaica on 7 June 2025. He ran 9.83 seconds to finish runner-up to Kishane Thompson in the 100 m at the 2025 Jamaican Athletics Championships.

On 19 July, he ran 9.86 seconds to win the 100 metres ahead of Noah Lyles and Letsile Tebogo at the London Diamond League, part of the 2025 Diamond League. The following month, he finished ahead of Lyles again winning in 9.87 (−0.3 m/s) at the Athletissima event in Lausanne in wet conditions.

On 14 September 2025 at the 2025 World Championships, Seville won the gold medal in the men's 100 metres, running 9.86 seconds in the semi-finals, and a new personal best of 9.77 seconds in the final to finish ahead of compatriot Kishane Thompson in second and Noah Lyles third. In October 2025, he had surgery to repair a toe injury he had since high school.

=== 2026 ===
At the Camperdown Classics in February in Kingston, he lowered his 400 m PB from 47.05 to 46.98 finishing 10th overall. In April, he raced at the Velocity Fest 19 meet clocking a 20.43 season opener in the 200 m. On 19 June, Seville won the 100 metre title at the Jamaican Athletics Championships with a time of 9.82 seconds. On 4 July, Seville ran 9.89 seconds to place second over 100 metres at the 2026 Prefontaine Classic.

On 10 July, he won in 9.88 seconds for the 100 m at the 2026 Herculis Diamond League event in Monaco. On 23 August, he competed over 100 m and won in a meeting record of 9.83 seconds (+1.4m/s) in the Diamond League at the 2026 Kamila Skolimowska Memorial in Silesia, Poland. At the 2026 Diamond League Final in Brussels on 4 September, Seville won the 100 metres title in a time of 9.90 seconds ahead of Emmanuel Eseme of Cameroon and Kayinsola Ajayi of Nigeria. On 12 September, he ran 9.90 seconds to place second behind Kenny Bednarek over 100 m at the inaugural World Ultimate Championship in Budapest.

== Athletics achievements ==
Information from her World Athletics profile unless otherwise noted.

=== Personal bests ===
| Type | Distance | Time (s) | Wind (m/s) | Venue | Date | Notes |
Individual events
| Outdoor | 60 metres | 6.42 | +0.9 | Kingston, Jamaica | 25 February 2023 | =NR |
| Outdoor | 100 metres | 9.77 | +0.3 | Tokyo, Japan | 14 September 2025 | |
| Outdoor | 200 metres | 20.13 | +0.2 | Miramar, United States | 4 May 2025 | |
| Outdoor | 400 metres | 46.98 | —N/a | Kingston, Jamaica | 14 February 2026 | |
Team events
| Outdoor | 4 × 100 metres relay | 37.68 | —N/a | Budapest, Hungary | 25 August 2023 | |

=== International competitions ===
Representing Jamaica
| Year | Competition | Venue | Position | Event | Time | Notes |
|---|---|---|---|---|---|---|
| 2019 | CARIFTA Games | George Town, Cayman Islands | 1st | 100 m | 10.24 | |
| 2019 | CARIFTA Games | George Town, Cayman Islands | 1st | 4 × 100 m relay | 39.46 | |
| 2019 | Pan American U20 Championships | San José, Costa Rica | 2nd | 100 m | 10.21 | |
| 2019 | Pan American U20 Championships | San José, Costa Rica | 2nd | 4 × 100 m relay | 39.20 | |
| 2021 | Olympic Games | Tokyo, Japan | 12th (sf) | 100 m | 10.09 | |
| 2021 | Olympic Games | Tokyo, Japan | 4th | 4 × 100 m relay | 37.84 | |
| 2022 | World Championships | Eugene, United States | 4th | 100 m | 9.97 | |
| 2022 | World Championships | Eugene, United States | 4th | 4 × 100 m relay | 38.06 | SB |
| 2023 | World Championships | Budapest, Hungary | 4th | 100 m | 9.88 | |
| 2023 | World Championships | Budapest, Hungary | 3rd | 4 × 100 m relay | 37.76 | |
| 2024 | Olympic Games | Paris, France | 8th | 100 m | 9.91 | |
| 2025 | World Championships | Tokyo, Japan | 1st | 100 m | 9.77 | PB |
| 2025 | World Championships | Tokyo, Japan | — | 4 × 100 m relay | DNF | |
| 2026 | World Ultimate Championship | Budapest, Hungary | 2nd | 100 m | 9.90 | |

=== Circuit performances ===
Grand Slam Track results
| Slam | Race group | Event | Pl. | Time | Prize money |
|---|---|---|---|---|---|
| 2025 Kingston Slam | Short sprints | 100 m | 2nd | 10.08 | US$30,000 |
| 2025 Kingston Slam | Short sprints | 200 m | 5th | 20.43 | US$30,000 |
| 2025 Miami Slam | Short sprints | 100 m | 2nd | 9.84 | US$50,000 |
| 2025 Miami Slam | Short sprints | 200 m | 3rd | 20.13 | US$50,000 |
