= Iraq at the 2009 World Championships in Athletics =

- WA code: IRQ

in Berlin
- Competitors: 2 (1 man, 1 woman)
- Medals: Gold 0 Silver 0 Bronze 0 Total 0

World Championships in Athletics appearances
- 1983; 1987–1995; 1997; 1999; 2001–2005; 2007; 2009; 2011; 2013; 2015; 2017; 2019; 2022; 2023

Iraq competes at the 2009 World Championships in Athletics from 15 to 23 August in Berlin.

== Team selection ==
Track and road events

Event	Athletes	
Event	Men	Women
100 metres		Dana Hussein Abdul-Razzaq

Field and combined events

Event	Athletes	
Event	Men	Women
Discus throw	Haidar Nasir	

== Results ==
=== Men ===
Field and combined events

Event	Athletes	Qualification		Final	
Event	Athletes	Result	Rank	Result	Rank
Discus throw	Haidar Nasir	NM		did not advance	

=== Women ===
Track and road events

Event	Athletes	Heats		Quarterfinals		Semifinal		Final	
Event	Athletes	Result	Rank	Result	Rank	Result	Rank	Result	Rank
100 m	Dana Hussein Abdul-Razzaq	12.38 SB	46	did not advance					
