= Mo'ath Alkhawaldeh =

Jordanian Olympic Athlete

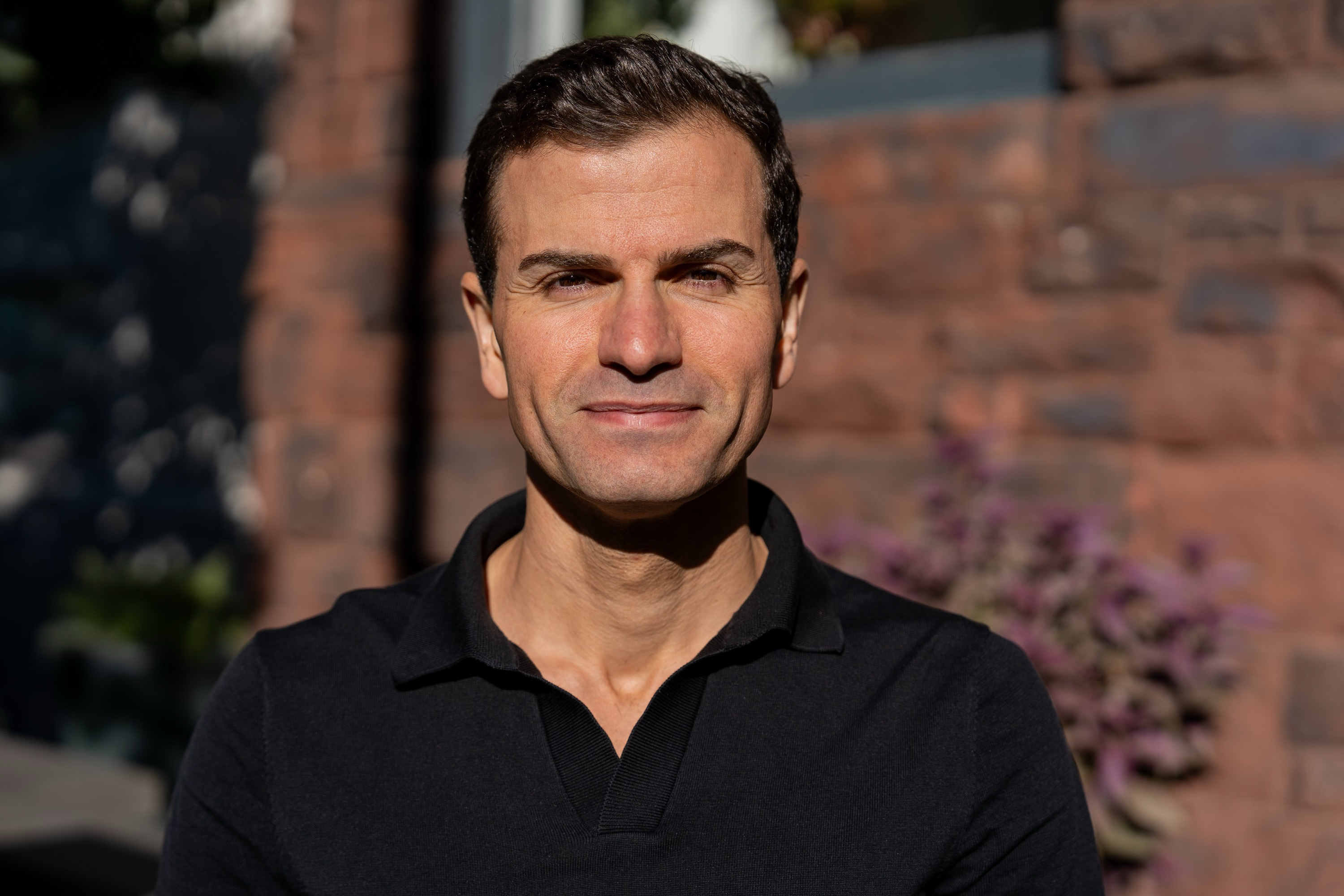
- Mo'ath Alkhawaldeh in 2024

Personal information
- Nationality: Jordanian
- Born: October 22, 1988 (age 38) Amman, Jordan
- Height: 5 ft 6 in (168 cm)
- Weight: 130 lb (59 kg)

Sport
- Country: Jordan
- Sport: Athletics
- Event: Marathon

Achievements and titles
- Personal best: Marathon: 2:17:55

Mo'ath Alkhawaldeh (born October 22, 1988) is a Jordanian Olympic runner, financial professional, and youth advocate. He represented Jordan in the marathon at the 2024 Summer Olympics in Paris and at the 2023 World Athletics Championships in Budapest. In addition to his athletic career, he works as a Financial and Program Manager at Princeton University.

== Early life and education ==
Alkhawaldeh was born in Jordan and began his running career in 2008. He earned an athletic scholarship to study in the United States, where he attended the New York Institute of Technology (NYIT). He received a Bachelor of Science in Accounting and a Master’s degree in Human Resource Management. During his college years, he was named NYIT’s Star Athlete of the Year in 2008 and a three-time East Coast Conference Runner of the Week in 2011.

== Athletic career ==
Alkhawaldeh has competed in numerous international marathons and road races. He holds a personal best of 2:17:55, recorded at the Valencia Marathon in 2024. He was one of the few athletes from Jordan to qualify for the Olympic marathon event, finishing 65th at the 2024 Summer Olympics in Paris with a time of 2:20:01.

In 2023, he represented Jordan in the men's marathon at the World Athletics Championships in Budapest, finishing 51st among 85 runners. He has trained under world-renowned coaches including Lee Troop and Ryan Hall.

== Professional career ==
Mo’ath Alkhawaldeh works in financial management at Princeton University, where he oversees budgeting, reporting, and compliance for international research programs.

== Honors and recognition ==
- 2015 – Named one of the “50 Most Influential People in Running” by Runner’s World
- 2016 – Selected for the “Rodale 100” for health and social impact
- 2017 – Recipient of the Athletes in Excellence Award by the Foundation for Global Sports Development

== Advocacy and community work ==
Alkhawaldeh is actively involved in sport-for-peace initiatives. He has worked with Generations For Peace to lead youth-focused sports programs in Tunisia, Rwanda, and Jordan. He is widely recognized for his efforts to promote inclusive athletic opportunities and mental wellness among underserved communities.

== Achievements ==
=== Road Racing Titles ===
- Rock 'n' Roll Washington DC Half Marathon – 13 November 2021: 1st place with a time of 1:07:48. Alkhawaldeh led the race from start to finish, averaging close to five minutes per mile.
- St. Jude Memphis Marathon – 3 December 2022: 1st place with a time of 2:26:19. This victory marked one of Alkhawaldeh's strongest marathon performances in the United States.
