= Timor-Leste at the 2011 World Championships in Athletics =

- WA code: TLS
- National federation: Federação de Timor-Leste de Atletismo
- Website: atletismutimorleste.multiply.com

in Daegu
- Competitors: 1
- Medals: Gold 0 Silver 0 Bronze 0 Total 0

World Championships in Athletics appearances
- 2011; 2013; 2015–2017; 2019; 2022; 2023

East Timor competed at the 2011 World Championships in Athletics from August 27 to September 4 in Daegu, South Korea. One athlete was announced to represent the country in the event.

== Results ==
=== Men ===
Athlete	Event	Preliminaries		Heats		Semifinals		Final	
Athlete	Event	Time Width Height	Rank	Time Width Height	Rank	Time Width Height	Rank	Time Width Height	Rank
Ribeiro Pinto de Carvalho	1500 metres			4:30.56 PB	37	Did not advance			
