= Timor-Leste at the 2013 World Championships in Athletics =

- WA code: TLS

in Moscow
- Competitors: 1
- Medals: Gold 0 Silver 0 Bronze 0 Total 0

World Championships in Athletics appearances
- 2011; 2013; 2015–2017; 2019; 2022; 2023

East Timor competed at the 2013 World Championships in Athletics from August 10 to August 18 in Moscow, Russia. A team of 1 athlete was announced to represent the country in the event.

== Results ==
(q – qualified, NM – no mark, SB – season best, PN - personal best)

=== Men ===
| Athlete | Event | Heats | | Semifinals | | Final | |
| Athlete | Event | Time | Rank | Time | Rank | Time | Rank |
|---|---|---|---|---|---|---|---|
| Ribeiro de Carvalho | 800 metres | 2:04.74 PB | 47 | did not advance | | | |
