= Manuel Ataide =

Timorese sprinter (born 2001)

Personal information
- Born: 9 March 2001 (age 25)
- Height: 1.76 m (5 ft 9 in)

Sport
- Sport: Athletics
- Events: 100 metres; 400 metres; 800 metres; 1500 metres

Achievements and titles
- Personal best(s): 100m: 11.35 (2024); 400m: 52.18 (2019); 800m: 1:55.24 (2023); 1500m: 4:08.98 (2018)

Manuel Belo Amaral Ataide (born 9 March 2001) is a Timorese sprinter. He competed in the men's 100 metres event at the 2024 Summer Olympics.

He was the closing ceremony flag bearer for East Timor at the 2024 Summer Olympics.
