= American Samoa at the World Athletics Championships =

- Flag of American Samoa
- WA code: ASA
- Medals: Gold 0 Silver 0 Bronze 1 Total 1

World Athletics Championships appearances (overview)
- 1987; 1991; 1993; 1995; 1997; 1999; 2001; 2003; 2005; 2007; 2009; 2011; 2013; 2015–2017; 2019; 2022; 2023; 2025

American Samoa has taken part in 15 editions of the World Athletics Championships, having won a bronze medal in 1999 by Lisa Misapeka in the women's hammer throw. It was the only medal won by an Oceania country other than Australia or New Zealand, until Alex Rose gave Samoa their first medal in 2025.

== Medalists ==
Medal	Name	Year	Event
Bronze	Lisa Misapeka	1999 Seville	Women's hammer throw

=== By event ===
Event	Gold	Silver	Bronze	Total
Hammer throw	0	0	1	1
Totals (1 entries)	0	0	1	1

=== By gender ===
Gender	Gold	Silver	Bronze	Total
Women	0	0	1	1
Men	0	0	0	0

== See also ==
- American Samoa at the Olympics
- American Samoa at the Paralympics
