= Samoa at the World Athletics Championships =

- Flag of Samoa
- WA code: SAM
- Medals: Gold 0 Silver 0 Bronze 1 Total 1

World Athletics Championships appearances (overview)
- 1983; 1987; 1991; 1993; 1995; 1997; 1999; 2001; 2003; 2005; 2007; 2009; 2011; 2013; 2015; 2017; 2019; 2022; 2023; 2025

Samoa has had a team in every edition of the World Athletics Championships, having won its first medal in athletics international competitions at the 2025 World Athletics Championships, by Alex Rose, with a 3rd place in discus throw. It was the second medal won by an athlete from the Samoan Islands, after American Samoan hammer thrower Lisa Misipeka who also won a bronze medal at the 1999 World Championships in Athletics. It is also the first major medal for Oceania without counting Australia or New Zealand.

== Medalists ==
| Medal | Name | Year | Event |
|---|---|---|---|
| Bronze | Alex Rose | 2025 Tokyo | Men's discus throw |

=== By event ===
| Event | Gold | Silver | Bronze | Total |
|---|---|---|---|---|
| Discus throw | 0 | 0 | 1 | 1 |
| Totals (1 entries) | 0 | 0 | 1 | 1 |

=== By gender ===
| Gender | Gold | Silver | Bronze | Total |
|---|---|---|---|---|
| Men | 0 | 0 | 1 | 1 |
| Women | 0 | 0 | 0 | 0 |

== See also ==
- Samoa at the Olympics
- Samoa at the Paralympics
