= Samoa at the 2025 World Athletics Championships =

- Flag of Samoa
- WA code: SAM

in Tokyo, Japan 13 September 2025 – 21 September 2025
- Competitors: 1 (1 man and 0 women)
- Medals Ranked 41st: Gold 0 Silver 0 Bronze 1 Total 1

World Athletics Championships appearances (overview)
- 1983; 1987; 1991; 1993; 1995; 1997; 1999; 2001; 2003; 2005; 2007; 2009; 2011; 2013; 2015; 2017; 2019; 2022; 2023; 2025

Samoa competed at the 2025 World Athletics Championships in Tokyo, Japan, from 13 to 21 September 2025. Alex Rose won the bronze medal in discus throw with a throw of 66.96m, which was Samoa's first ever medal at the World Championships.

== Medallists ==
Medal	Athlete	Event	Date
Bronze	Alex Rose	Men's discus throw	September 21

== Results ==
Samoa entered 1 male athlete to the championships.

Key

- Q = Qualified for the next round
- q = Qualified for the next round as a fastest loser or, in field events, by position without achieving the qualifying target
- NR = National record
- PB = Personal best
- SB = Season best
- N/A = Round not applicable for the event

=== Men ===
Field events

Athlete	Event	Qualification		Final	
Athlete	Event	Distance	Position	Distance	Position
Alex Rose	Discus throw	65.13m	10 q	66.96m	3rd place, bronze medalist(s)
