= 2007 World Championships in Athletics – Men's 100 metres =

Men's 100 metres at the 2007 World Championships
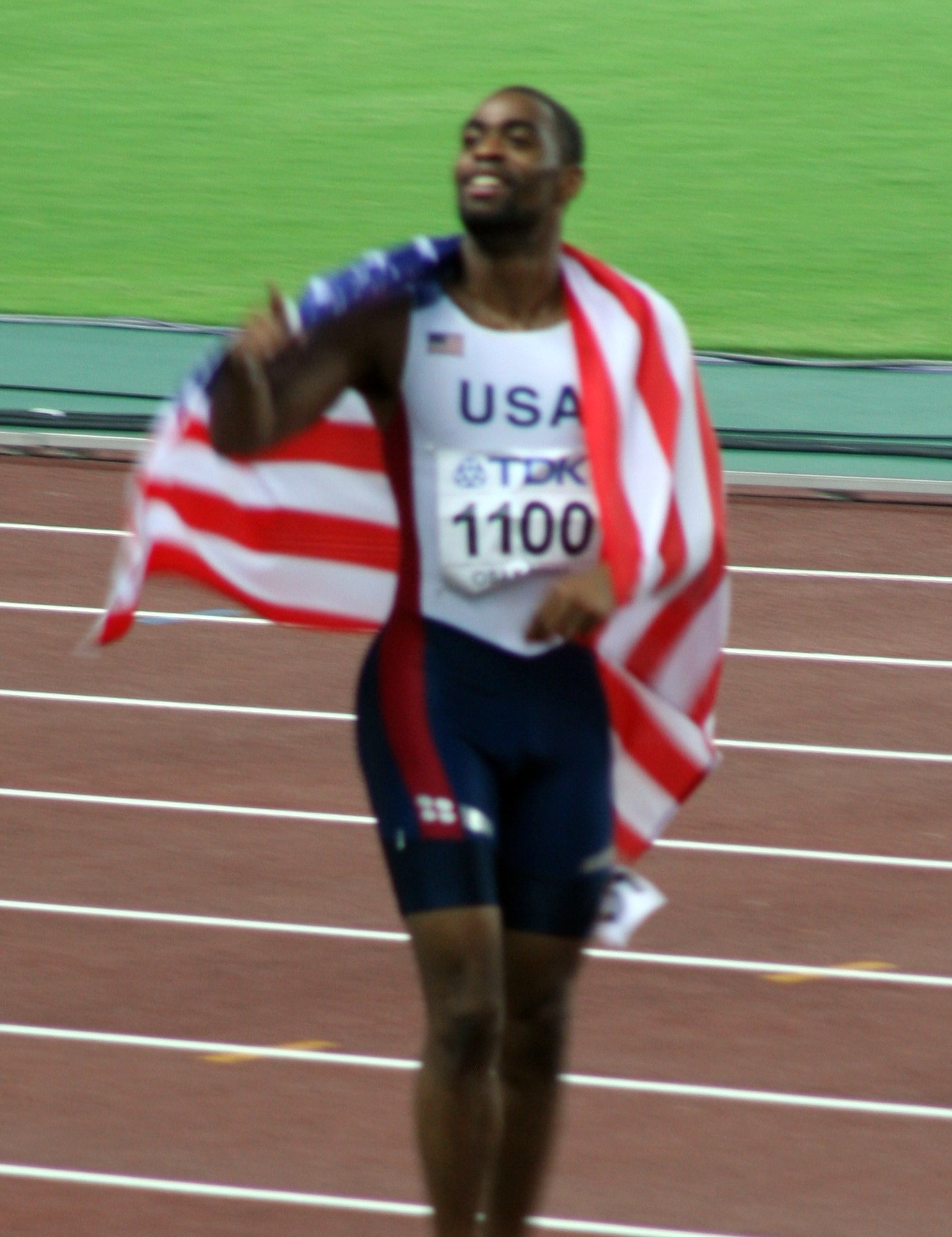
- Tyson Gay after winning the 100 m
- Venue: Osaka Nagai Stadium
- Dates: 25 August (heats and quarter-finals); 26 August (semi-finals and final)
- Competitors: 44
- Winning time: 9.85

Medalists
gold medal	Tyson Gay	United States
silver medal	Derrick Atkins	Bahamas
bronze medal	Asafa Powell	Jamaica

The 100 metres at the 2007 World Championships in Athletics was held at the Nagai Stadium on August 25 and August 26.

== Medalists ==
Gold	Silver	Bronze
Tyson Gay; United States	Derrick Atkins; Bahamas	Asafa Powell; Jamaica

== Records ==
World record	Asafa Powell	9.77	Athens, Greece	14 June 2005
World record	Asafa Powell	9.77	Gateshead, England	11 June 2006
World record	Asafa Powell	9.77	Zürich, Switzerland	18 August 2006
Championship record	Maurice Greene	9.80	Seville, Spain	22 August 1999

== Results ==
KEY:	q	Fastest non-qualifiers	Q	Qualified	NR	National record	PB	Personal best	SB	Seasonal best

=== Heats ===
Qualification: First 3 in each heat (Q) and the next 8 fastest (q) advance to the quarterfinals.

Rank	Heat	Lane	Name	Nationality	Time	Notes
1	3	4	Marlon Devonish	Great Britain & N.I.	10.13	Q
2	1	1	Nobuharu Asahara	Japan	10.14	Q, SB
3	2	3	Brendan Christian	Antigua and Barbuda	10.16	Q, SB
3	8	6	Churandy Martina	Netherlands Antilles	10.16	Q
5	7	1	Nesta Carter	Jamaica	10.17	Q
6	1	8	Tyson Gay	United States	10.19	Q
7	7	3	Naoki Tsukahara	Japan	10.20	Q, PB
8	5	2	Henry Vizcaíno	Cuba	10.21	Q
8	8	7	Mark Lewis-Francis	Great Britain & N.I.	10.21	Q
8	3	6	Matic Osovnikar	Slovenia	10.21	Q
11	3	2	Simone Collio	Italy	10.22	Q
11	8	5	Marc Burns	Trinidad and Tobago	10.22	Q
13	2	6	Craig Pickering	Great Britain & N.I.	10.24	Q
14	7	2	Patrick Johnson	Australia	10.25	Q
14	2	5	Derrick Atkins	Bahamas	10.25	Q
16	7	6	Rosario La Mastra	Italy	10.27	q, PB
16	2	9	Olusoji Fasuba	Nigeria	10.27	q
18	6	4	Keston Bledman	Trinidad and Tobago	10.29	Q
18	4	2	Richard Thompson	Trinidad and Tobago	10.29	Q
20	1	6	Sherwin Vries	South Africa	10.30	Q
21	4	3	Anson Henry	Canada	10.31	Q
21	5	6	Clement Campbell	Jamaica	10.31	Q
23	5	5	Vicente de Lima	Brazil	10.34	Q
23	6	3	Asafa Powell	Jamaica	10.34	Q
23	8	4	Josh Ross	Australia	10.34	q
23	1	4	Kim Collins	Saint Kitts and Nevis	10.34	q
27	6	7	Martial Mbandjock	France	10.36	Q
28	4	9	Ángel David Rodríguez	Spain	10.37	Q
29	6	1	Florin Suciu	Romania	10.38	q
30	5	9	J-Mee Samuels	United States	10.39	q
31	8	2	Dariusz Kuć	Poland	10.42	q
32	8	8	Jan Žumer	Slovenia	10.45	q
33	1	2	José Carlos Moreira	Brazil	10.46	
34	2	2	Sandro Viana	Brazil	10.46	
35	3	5	Gibrilla Pato Bangura	Sierra Leone	10.50	
36	5	8	Wilfried Bingangoye	Gabon	10.53	
37	7	4	Sébastien Gattuso	Monaco	10.55	NR
38	3	8	Béranger Bosse	Central African Republic	10.59	
39	4	4	Idrissa Sanou	Burkina Faso	10.61	
40	5	7	Yahya Hassan I. Habeeb	Saudi Arabia	10.65	
41	6	2	Holder da Silva	Guinea-Bissau	10.68	
42	6	9	Ruslan Abbasov	Azerbaijan	10.72	
43	4	8	Franklin Nazareno	Ecuador	10.73	
44	6	5	Boris Savic	Montenegro	10.88	
45	1	7	Muhammed Patoniah	Indonesia	10.92	PB
45	2	4	Darren Gilford	Malta	10.92	
47	7	9	Jurgen Themen	Suriname	10.96	PB
48	1	4	Tyrone Omar	Northern Mariana Islands	11.00	
49	3	9	JJ Capelle	Nauru	11.02	PB
50	7	7	Jack Howard	Federated States of Micronesia	11.03	SB
51	2	1	Keiron Rogers	Anguilla	11.05	
52	4	6	Chris Walasi	Solomon Islands	11.07	SB
53	1	5	Iowane Dovumatua	Fiji	11.09	
54	5	4	Aisea Tohi	Tonga	11.10	PB
55	3	7	Hin Fong Pao	Macau	11.21	PB
56	5	3	Muhammad Haziq Haji Awang	Brunei	11.22	PB
57	8	3	Mounir Mahadi	Chad	11.24	
58	6	8	Moussa Camara	Guinea	11.49	PB
59	1	3	Tim Natua	Kiribati	11.51	PB
60	6	6	Odingo Gordon	Montserrat	11.58	SB
61	2	8	Reginaldo Micha Ndong	Equatorial Guinea	11.59	SB
62	8	9	Waleed Anwari	Afghanistan	11.75	SB
63	2	7	Tika Ram Tharu	Nepal	11.83	PB
64	7	8	Dayne O'Hara	Norfolk Island	11.86	PB
65	4	7	Sloane Sanitoa	American Samoa	12.64	PB
66	4	5	Mark Jelks	United States	13.64	SB
–	5	5	Samuel Francis	Qatar	DNF	
–	3	3	Francis Obikwelu	Portugal	DQ	

=== Quarterfinals ===
First 4 of each Heat directly qualified (Q) for the Semifinals.

Rank	Heat	Lane	Name	Nationality	Time	Notes
1	1	7	Asafa Powell	Jamaica	10.01	Q
2	1	8	Derrick Atkins	Bahamas	10.02	Q
3	2	4	Tyson Gay	United States	10.06	Q
4	3	4	Churandy Martina	Netherlands Antilles	10.10	Q
5	2	7	Marlon Devonish	Great Britain & N.I.	10.13	Q
5	1	6	Matic Osovnikar	Slovenia	10.13	Q, NR
7	1	4	Nobuharu Asahara	Japan	10.16	Q
8	3	7	Mark Lewis-Francis	Great Britain & N.I.	10.17	Q, SB
9	3	5	Anson Henry	Canada	10.20	Q, SB
10	4	4	Craig Pickering	Great Britain & N.I.	10.21	Q
10	4	9	Marc Burns	Trinidad and Tobago	10.21	Q
12	3	6	Nesta Carter	Jamaica	10.23	Q
13	2	9	Olusoji Fasuba	Nigeria	10.24	Q
14	4	5	Brendan Christian	Antigua and Barbuda	10.26	Q
15	2	5	Clement Campbell	Jamaica	10.28	Q
16	3	9	J-Mee Samuels	United States	10.29	
16	3	8	Patrick Johnson	Australia	10.29	
18	4	3	Kim Collins	Saint Kitts and Nevis	10.30	Q
19	2	8	Simone Collio	Italy	10.31	
19	4	7	Naoki Tsukahara	Japan	10.31	
21	1	2	Rosario La Mastra	Italy	10.32	
22	2	6	Keston Bledman	Trinidad and Tobago	10.33	
23	3	2	Sherwin Vries	South Africa	10.36	
24	1	3	Dariusz Kuć	Poland	10.37	
25	4	2	Vicente de Lima	Brazil	10.38	
26	1	9	Martial Mbandjock	France	10.39	
26	2	3	Ángel David Rodríguez	Spain	10.39	
28	4	6	Henry Vizcaíno	Cuba	10.40	
29	3	3	Florin Suciu	Romania	10.41	
30	4	8	Josh Ross	Australia	10.42	
31	2	2	Jan Žumer	Slovenia	10.44	
31	1	5	Richard Thompson	Trinidad and Tobago	10.44	

=== Semifinals ===
First 4 of each Heat directly qualified (Q) for the Final.

Rank	Heat	Lane	Name	Nationality	Time	Notes
1	2	4	Tyson Gay	United States	10.00	Q
2	1	6	Derrick Atkins	Bahamas	10.04	Q
3	1	4	Asafa Powell	Jamaica	10.08	Q
4	2	7	Marlon Devonish	Great Britain & N.I.	10.12	Q
5	2	6	Churandy Martina	Netherlands Antilles	10.15	Q
6	1	9	Matic Osovnikar	Slovenia	10.17	Q
7	2	9	Olusoji Fasuba	Nigeria	10.18	Q
8	2	5	Mark Lewis-Francis	Great Britain & N.I.	10.19	
9	2	2	Anson Henry	Canada	10.20	SB
10	1	5	Marc Burns	Trinidad and Tobago	10.21	Q
10	1	2	Kim Collins	Saint Kitts and Nevis	10.21	SB
12	2	3	Nesta Carter	Jamaica	10.28	
12	2	8	Clement Campbell	Jamaica	10.28	
14	1	8	Brendan Christian	Antigua and Barbuda	10.29	
14	1	7	Craig Pickering	Great Britain & N.I.	10.29	
16	1	3	Nobuharu Asahara	Japan	10.36	

=== Final ===
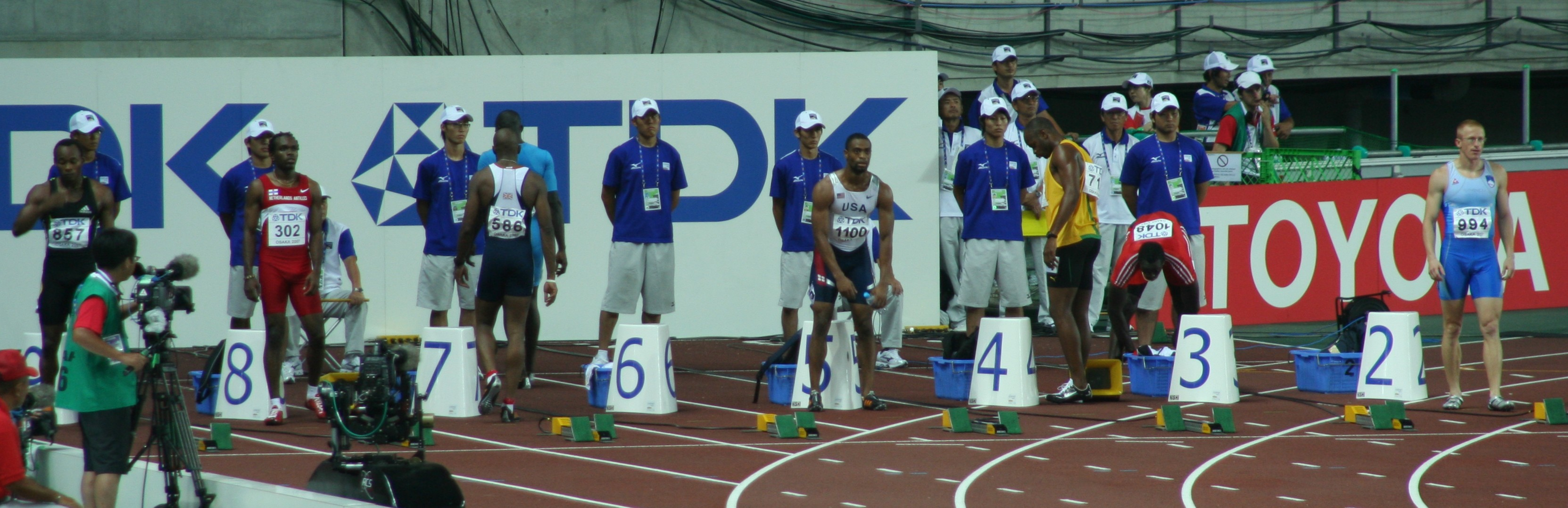
Final participants

Rank	Athlete	Nation	Time	Notes
Gold medal	Tyson Gay	United States	9.85	
Silver medal	Derrick Atkins	Bahamas	9.91	NR
Bronze medal	Asafa Powell	Jamaica	9.96	
4	Olusoji Fasuba	Nigeria	10.07	SB
5	Churandy Martina	Netherlands Antilles	10.08	
6	Marlon Devonish	Great Britain & N.I.	10.14	
7	Matic Osovnikar	Slovenia	10.23	
8	Marc Burns	Trinidad and Tobago	10.29	
