= American Samoa at the 2023 World Athletics Championships =

- Flag of American Samoa
- WA code: ASA

in Budapest, Hungary 19 August 2023 – 27 August 2023
- Competitors: 1 (1 man and 0 women)
- Medals: Gold 0 Silver 0 Bronze 0 Total 0

World Athletics Championships appearances (overview)
- 1987; 1991; 1993; 1995; 1997; 1999; 2001; 2003; 2005; 2007; 2009; 2011; 2013; 2015–2017; 2019; 2022; 2023; 2025

American Samoa competed at the 2023 World Athletics Championships in Budapest, Hungary, which were held from 19 to 27 August 2023. The athlete delegation of the country was composed of one competitor, sprinter Nathan Crumpton who competed in the men's 100 metres. He qualified for the Championships upon being selected by the American Samoa Track & Field Association. In the preliminary round, he placed fifth and set a new season's best without advancing further.

== Background ==
The 2023 World Athletics Championships in Budapest, Hungary, were held from 19 to 27 August 2023. The Championships were held at the National Athletics Centre. To qualify for the World Championships, athletes had to reach an entry standard (e.g. time or distance), place in a specific position at select competitions, be a wild card entry, or qualify through their World Athletics Ranking at the end of the qualification period.

As American Samoa did not meet any of the four standards, they could send either one male or one female athlete in one event of the Championships who has not yet qualified. The American Samoa Track & Field Association selected sprinter Nathan Crumpton, who would compete in the men's 100 metres. At the time of his selection, he had a personal best of 11.27 seconds in the event. Previously, he represented American Samoa at the 2020 Summer Olympics, 2022 World Athletics Championships, and 2022 Winter Olympics.

== Results ==
Key

- Q = Qualified for the next round
- q = Qualified for the next round as a fastest loser or, in field events, by position without achieving the qualifying target
- NR = National record
- PB = Personal best
- SB = Season best
- N/A = Round not applicable for the event

=== Men ===
Crumpton competed in the fourth preliminary round of the men's 100 metres on 19 August against six other sprinters. There, he recorded a time of 11.32 seconds for a new season's best and placed fifth, failing to advance further to the heats as only the top two of each heat and the two next fastest would be able to do so.

Track and road events

Athlete	Event	Preliminary		Heat		Semifinal		Final	
Athlete	Event	Result	Rank	Result	Rank	Result	Rank	Result	Rank
Nathan Crumpton	100 metres	11.32 SB	5	Did not advance					
