= Norfolk Island at the 2007 World Championships in Athletics =

- Flag of Norfolk Island
- WA code: NFI

in Osaka, Japan 25 August 2007 – 2 September 2007
- Competitors: 1 (1 man and 0 women)
- Medals: Gold 0 Silver 0 Bronze 0 Total 0

World Championships in Athletics appearances
- 1995; 1997; 1999; 2001; 2003–2005; 2007

Norfolk Island competed at the 2007 World Championships in Athletics in Osaka, Japan, from 25 August to 2 September 2007. As of 2024, this was the last time Norfolk Island participated at the World Athletics Championships.

== Results ==
Norfolk Island entered 1 athlete.

Key

- Q = Qualified for the next round
- q = Qualified for the next round as a fastest loser or, in field events, by position without achieving the qualifying target
- NR = National record
- PB = Personal best
- SB = Season best
- N/A = Round not applicable for the event

=== Men ===
Track and road events

| Athlete | Event | Heat | | Quarter-final | | Semifinal | | Final | | Final Rank |
| Athlete | Event | Result | Rank | Result | Rank | Result | Rank | Result | Rank | Final Rank |
|---|---|---|---|---|---|---|---|---|---|---|
| Dayne O'Hara | 100 metres | 11.86 PB | 8 | Did not advance | | | | | | 64 |
