= Samoa at the 2023 World Athletics Championships =

- Flag of Samoa
- WA code: SAM

in Budapest, Hungary 19 August 2023 – 27 August 2023
- Competitors: 1 (1 man and 0 women)
- Medals: Gold 0 Silver 0 Bronze 0 Total 0

World Athletics Championships appearances (overview)
- 1983; 1987; 1991; 1993; 1995; 1997; 1999; 2001; 2003; 2005; 2007; 2009; 2011; 2013; 2015; 2017; 2019; 2022; 2023; 2025

Samoa competed at the 2023 World Athletics Championships in Budapest, Hungary, which were held from 19 to 27 August 2023. The athlete delegation of the country was composed of one competitor, thrower Alex Rose who competed in the men's discus throw. He qualified for the Championships upon meeting the entry standard of 64.20 metres. He placed eighth in qualifying and advanced to the final where he placed 12th.

== Background ==
The 2023 World Athletics Championships in Budapest, Hungary, were held from 19 to 27 August 2023. The Championships were held at the National Athletics Centre. To qualify for the World Championships, athletes had to reach an entry standard (e.g. time or distance), place in a specific position at select competitions, be a wild card entry, or qualify through their World Athletics Ranking at the end of the qualification period.

Samoa was represented by one athlete, discus thrower Alex Rose, who qualified upon meeting the entry standard of 64.20 metres by throwing a distance of 64.56 metres in the finals of the 2022 Commonwealth Games. Before the Championships had started, Rose had a personal best of 70.39 metres set in April and was ranked ninth in the world. He was the only athlete from a Pacific Island nation to have qualified for the Championships based on merit.

== Results ==
Key

- Q = Qualified for the next round
- q = Qualified for the next round as a fastest loser or, in field events, by position without achieving the qualifying target
- NR = National record
- PB = Personal best
- SB = Season best
- N/A = Round not applicable for the event

=== Men ===
Rose first competed in the qualifying of the event in Group A against 16 other competitors. He recorded his farthest distance of 65.26 metres in his second attempt and placed eighth, qualifying as he was within the top 12 participants with the longest throwers. In the finals, he failed his first two attempts and threw 61.69 metres for his last. Overall, he placed last.

Field events

Athlete	Event	Qualification		Final	
Athlete	Event	Distance	Position	Distance	Position
Alex Rose	Discus throw	65.26	8 q	61.69	12
