= American Samoa at the 2009 World Championships in Athletics =

- WA code: ASA

in Berlin
- Competitors: 2
- Medals: Gold 0 Silver 0 Bronze 0 Total 0

World Championships in Athletics appearances
- 1987; 1991; 1993; 1995; 1997; 1999; 2001; 2003; 2005; 2007; 2009; 2011; 2013; 2015–2017; 2019; 2022; 2023; 2025

American Samoa fielded two competitors at the 2009 World Championships in Athletics in Berlin.

== Team selection ==
Event	Athletes	
Event	Men	Women
100 metres	Aaron Victorian	Savannah Sanitoa

== Results ==
=== Men ===
Event	Athletes	Heats		Quarterfinals		Semifinal		Final	
Event	Athletes	Result	Rank	Result	Rank	Result	Rank	Result	Rank
100 m	Aaron Victorian	11.37 PB	80	did not advance					

=== Women ===
Event	Athletes	Heats		Quarterfinals		Semifinal		Final	
Event	Athletes	Result	Rank	Result	Rank	Result	Rank	Result	Rank
100 m	Savannah Sanitoa	14.23	59	did not advance					
