= Samoa at the 2017 World Championships in Athletics =

- Flag of Samoa
- WA code: SAM
- National federation: Athletics Samoa
- Website: Official website

in London, United Kingdom 4–13 August 2017
- Competitors: 2 (2 men) in 3 events
- Medals: Gold 0 Silver 0 Bronze 0 Total 0

World Championships in Athletics appearances
- 1983; 1987; 1991; 1993; 1995; 1997; 1999; 2001; 2003; 2005; 2007; 2009; 2011; 2013; 2015; 2017; 2019; 2022; 2023; 2025

Samoa competed at the 2017 World Championships in Athletics in London, Great Britain; from 4–13 August 2017.

== Results ==
=== Men ===
Track and road events

Athlete	Event	Heat		Semifinal		Final	
Athlete	Event	Result	Rank	Result	Rank	Result	Rank
Jeremy Dodson	100 metres	10.52	42	Did not advance			
Jeremy Dodson	200 metres	20.81	36	Did not advance			

Field events

Athlete	Event	Qualification		Final	
Athlete	Event	Distance	Position	Distance	Position
Alex Rose	Discus throw	61.62	19	Did not advance	
