= Great Britain and Northern Ireland at the 2007 World Championships in Athletics =

- WA code: GBR
- National federation: UK Athletics
- Website: uka.org.uk

in Osaka
- Competitors: 60
- Medals Ranked 11th: Gold 1 Silver 1 Bronze 4 Total 6

World Championships in Athletics appearances (overview)
- 1976; 1980; 1983; 1987; 1991; 1993; 1995; 1997; 1999; 2001; 2003; 2005; 2007; 2009; 2011; 2013; 2015; 2017; 2019; 2022; 2023; 2025

The United Kingdom of Great Britain and Northern Ireland competed under the shortened name of Great Britain and Northern Ireland at the 2007 World Championships in Athletics.

Heading into the championships, UK Athletics set a target of three medals and fourteen top eight-placed athletes. Six medals were won and there were thirteen top eight finishes.

== Results ==
=== Finals ===
List of Britain's results, where athletes reached the final in that event (performances in heats, quarter-finals and semi-finals are not included.)

Position	Athlete	Event	Result	Notes
1st	Christine Ohuruogu	400 m W	49.61	PB
2nd	Nicola Sanders	400 m W	49.65	PB
3rd	Kelly Sotherton	Heptathlon	6510	SB
3rd	Christian Malcolm, Craig Pickering, Marlon Devonish, Mark Lewis-Frances	4 × 100 m M	37.90	SB
3rd	Christine Ohuruogu, Marilyn Okoro, Lee McConnell, Nicola Sanders	4 × 400 m W	3:20.04	NR
3rd	Joanne Pavey	10,000 m W	32:03.81	
4th	Laura Turner, Montell Douglas, Emily Freeman, Joice Maduaka	4 × 100 m W	42.87	
4th	Jessica Ennis	Heptathlon	6469	PB
6th	Marlon Devonish	100 m M	10.14	
6th	Phillips Idowu	Triple Jump M	17.09	
6th	Mo Farah	5,000 m M	13:47.54	
6th	Andrew Steele, Robert Tobin, Richard Buck, Martyn Rooney	4 × 400 m M	3:02.94	
7th	Brian Alldis	1,500 m Wheelchair M	3:28.41	
8th	Natasha Danvers-Smith	400 mH W	54:94	
8th	Shelley Woods	1,500 m Wheelchair W	3:40.84	
9th	Andrew Baddeley	1,500 m M	3:35.95	
9th	Joanne Pavey	5,000 m W	15:04.77	SB
9th	Mara Yamauchi	Marathon W	2:32:55	
10th	Tom Parsons	High Jump M	2.26	
11th	Dan Robinson	Marathon M	2:20.30	
14th	Martyn Bernard	High Jump M	2.21	
19th	Tracey Morris	Marathon W	2:36:40	SB
25th	Joanna Jackson	20 km Walk W	1:39:34	
51st	Peter Riley	Marathon M	2:36:00	SB

=== Qualification rounds ===
('Q': Automatic Qualifier, 'q': Fastest Loser Qualifier, '-': Did not qualify, 'DQ' – Disqualified, 'n/a' Not applicable, 'NMR': No Mark Recorded) SB: Season's Best, PB: Personal Best)

NOTE: Where an athlete reached a final, their result will be posted above ONLY and not below

100 m M

Athlete	Heats	Q?	Quarter-Final	Q?	Semi-final	Q?
Marlon Devonish	10.13	Q	10.13	Q	10.12	Q
Mark Lewis-Francis	10.21	Q	10.17 (SB)	Q	10.19	-
Craig Pickering	10.24	Q	10.21	Q	10.29	-

100 m W

Athlete	Heats	Q?	Quarter-Final	Q?	Semi-final	Q?
Montell Douglas	11.39	Q	11.43	-	n/a	-
Laura Turner	11.46	Q	11.32	Q	11.32	-
Jeanette Kwakye	11.26 (PB)	q	11.40	-	n/a	-

200 m W

Athlete	Heats	Q?	Quarter-Final	Q?	Semi-final	Q?
Joice Maduaka	23.22	Q	23.62	-	n/a	-
Emily Freeman	DQ	-	n/a	-	n/a	-

400 m M

Athlete	Heats	Q?	Semi-final	Q?
Tim Benjamin	45.44	Q	46.17	-
Martyn Rooney	45.47 (SB)	-	n/a	-
Andrew Steele	45.54	-	n/a	-

400 m W

Athlete	Heats	Q?	Semi-final	Q?
Lee McConnell	51.44 (SB)	Q	51.07 (SB)	-
Nicola Sanders	51.45	Q	49.77 (PB)	Q
Christine Ohuruogu	50.46 (SB)	Q	50.17 (PB)	Q

800 m M

Athlete	Heats	Q?	Semi-final	Q?
Michael Rimmer	1:45.66	Q	1:47.39	-

800 m W

Athlete	Heats	Q?	Semi-final	Q?
Jemma Simpson	2:00.47	Q	2:00.48	-
Jennifer Meadows	2:00.14 (PB)	Q	1:59.39 (PB)	-
Marilyn Okoro	2:01.79	Q	1:59.63 (PB)	-

1,500 m M

Athlete	Heats	Q?	Semi-final	Q?
Andrew Baddeley	3:39.60	Q	3:43.03	Q

1,500 m W

Athlete	Heats	Q?	Semi-final	Q?
Lisa Dobriskey	4:09.67	Q	4:08.39	-
Abby Westley	4:10.61	Q	4:16.21	-

5000 m M

Athlete	Qualifying	Q?
Mo Farah	13:39.13 (SB)	Q

5000 m W

Athlete	Qualifying	Q?
Joanne Pavey	15:11.83 (SB)	Q

110 m Hurdles

Athlete	Heats	Q?	Semi-final	Q?
Andy Turner	13.27 (PB)	Q	13.38	-

400 mH M

Athlete	Heats	Q?	Semi-final	Q?
Dale Garland	49.98	-	n/a	-

400 mH W

Athlete	Heats	Q?	Semi-final	Q?
Natasha Danvers-Smith	55.67	Q	54.08 (SB)	Q

3,000 m SC W

Athlete	Qualifying	Q?
Hatti Dean	9:43.23	-
Helen Clitheroe	9:45.59	-

3,000 m SC M

Athlete	Qualifying	Q?
Andrew Lemoncello	8:58.93	-

High Jump M

Athlete	Qualifying	Q?
Tom Parsons	2.29 (PB)	Q
Martyn Bernard	2.29 (PB)	Q
Germaine Mason	2.19	-

Long Jump M

Athlete	Qualifying	Q?
Christopher Tomlinson	7.89	-
Greg Rutherford	7.77	-

Triple Jump M

Athlete	Qualifying	Q?
Phillips Idowu	17.07	q

Pole Vault M

Athlete	Qualifying	Q?
Steven Lewis	NMR	-

Pole Vault W

Athlete	Qualifying	Q?
Kate Dennison	4.20 m	-

Javelin Throw W

Athlete	Qualifying	Q?
Goldie Sayers	57.23	-

4 × 100 m M

Athlete	Qualifying	Q?
Christian Malcolm, Craig Pickering, Marlon Devonish, Mark Lewis-Francis	38.33	Q

4 × 100 m W

Athlete	Qualifying	Q?
Laura Turner, Montell Douglas, Emily Freeman, Joice Maduaka	42.82 (SB)	Q

4 × 400 m M

Athlete	Qualifying	Q?
Andrew Steele, Robert Tobin, Richard Buck, Martyn Rooney	3:01.22 (SB)	q

4 × 400 m W

Athlete	Qualifying	Q?
Lee McConnell, Donna Fraser, Marilyn Okoro, Nicola Sanders	3:25.45 (SB)	Q

== Competitors ==
=== Actual List ===
This is the actual team of athletes that Great Britain sent to Osaka. Some of the athletes were added as reserves, or other reasons. See below for the original list.

=== Men ===
100 m: Marlon Devonish, Mark Lewis-Francis, Craig Pickering
400 m: Timothy Benjamin, Andrew Steele, Martyn Rooney
800 m: Michael Rimmer
1,500 m: Andrew Baddeley
5,000 m: Mo Farah
Marathon: Peter Riley, Dan Robinson
3,000 m Steeplechase: Andrew Lemoncello
110 m Hurdles: Andrew Turner
400 m Hurdles: Dale Garland
4 × 100 m Relay: Craig Pickering, Marlon Devonish, Tyrone Edgar, Mark Lewis-Francis, Christian Malcolm, Alex Nelson
4 × 400 m Relay: Timothy Benjamin, Martyn Rooney, Robert Tobin, Andrew Steele, Richard Buck

High Jump: Martyn Bernard, Germaine Mason, Tom Parsons
Long Jump: Greg Rutherford, Chris Tomlinson
Triple Jump: Phillips Idowu,

=== Women ===
100 m: Montell Douglas, Laura Turner, Jeanette Kwakye
200 m: Joice Maduaka, Emily Freeman
400 m: Christine Ohuruogu, Nicola Sanders, Lee McConnell
800 m: Jemma Simpson, Marilyn Okoro, Jennifer Meadows
1,500 m: Lisa Dobriskey, Abby Westley
5,000 m: Jo Pavey
10,000 m: Jo Pavey
Marathon: Tracey Morris, Mara Yamauchi
3,000 m Steeplechase: Hatti Dean, Helen Clitheroe
400 m Hurdles: Natasha Danvers-Smith
4 × 100 m Relay: Jeanette Kwakye, Montell Douglas, Emily Freeman, Joice Maduaka, Anyika Onuora, Laura Turner
4 × 400 m Relay: Nicola Sanders, Christine Ohuruogu, Lee McConnell, Vicki Barr, Jenny Meadows, Donna Fraser

Pole Vault: Kate Dennison
Javelin: Goldie Sayers
Heptathlon: Jessica Ennis, Kelly Sotherton
20 km Walk: Joanna Jackson
1500 m Wheelchair: Shelly Woods

=== Original List ===
The athletes below were the original list of competitors, however due to other circumstances, injury etc., some were replaced or more added. The revised list is above this list.

=== Men ===
100 m: Marlon Devonish, Mark Lewis-Francis, Craig Pickering
400 m: Timothy Benjamin, Andrew Steele, Martyn Rooney
800 m: Michael Rimmer
1,500 m: Andrew Baddeley
5,000 m: Mohammed Farah
Marathon: Peter Riley, Dan Robinson
3,000 m Steeplechase: Andrew Lemoncello
110 m Hurdles: Andrew Turner
400 m Hurdles: Dai Greene, Dale Garland
4 × 100 m Relay: Craig Pickering, Marlon Devonish, Tyrone Edgar, Mark Lewis-Francis, Christian Malcolm, Dwayne Grant
4 × 400 m Relay: Timothy Benjamin, Martyn Rooney, Robert Tobin, Andrew Steele, Richard Buck

High Jump: Martyn Bernard, Germaine Mason, Tom Parsons
Long Jump: Greg Rutherford, Chris Tomlinson
Triple Jump: Phillips Idowu,
1500 m Wheelchair: David Weir

=== Women ===
100 m: Montell Douglas, Laura Turner
200 m: Joice Maduaka, Jeanette Kwakye
400 m: Christine Ohuruogu, Nicola Sanders, Lee McConnell
800 m: Jemma Simpson, Marilyn Okoro, Becky Lyne
1,500 m: Lisa Dobriskey, Abby Westley
5,000 m: Jo Pavey
10,000 m: Jo Pavey
Marathon: Tracey Morris, Mara Yamauchi
3,000 m Steeplechase: Hatti Dean, Helen Clitheroe
400 m Hurdles: Natasha Danvers-Smith
4 × 100 m Relay: Jeanette Kwakye, Montell Douglas, Emily Freeman, Joice Maduaka, Anyika Onuora, Laura Turner
4 × 400 m Relay: Nicola Sanders, Christine Ohuruogu, Lee McConnell, Vicki Barr, Jenny Meadows, Donna Fraser

Pole Vault: Kate Dennison
Javelin: Goldie Sayers
Heptathlon: Jessica Ennis, Kelly Sotherton
20 km Walk: Joanna Jackson
1500 m Wheelchair: Shelly Woods
