= American Samoa at the 2007 World Championships in Athletics =

- Flag of American Samoa
- WA code: ASA

in Osaka, Japan 25 August 2007 – 2 September 2007
- Competitors: 1 (1 man and 0 women)
- Medals: Gold 0 Silver 0 Bronze 0 Total 0

World Championships in Athletics appearances
- 1987; 1991; 1993; 1995; 1997; 1999; 2001; 2003; 2005; 2007; 2009; 2011; 2013; 2015–2017; 2019; 2022; 2023; 2025

American Samoa competed at the 2007 World Championships in Athletics in Osaka, Japan, from 25 August to 2 September 2007.

== Results ==
American Samoa entered 1 athlete.

Key

- Q = Qualified for the next round
- q = Qualified for the next round as a fastest loser or, in field events, by position without achieving the qualifying target
- NR = National record
- PB = Personal best
- SB = Season best
- N/A = Round not applicable for the event

=== Men ===
Track and road events

Athlete	Event	Heat		Quarter-final		Semifinal		Final		Final Rank
Athlete	Event	Result	Rank	Result	Rank	Result	Rank	Result	Rank	Final Rank
Sloane Sanitoa	100 metres	12.64 PB	7	Did not advance						65
