= American Samoa at the 2013 World Championships in Athletics =

- WA code: ASA

in Moscow
- Competitors: 1
- Medals: Gold 0 Silver 0 Bronze 0 Total 0

World Championships in Athletics appearances
- 1987; 1991; 1993; 1995; 1997; 1999; 2001; 2003; 2005; 2007; 2009; 2011; 2013; 2015–2017; 2019; 2022; 2023; 2025

American Samoa competed at the 2013 World Championships in Athletics from August 10 to August 18 in Moscow, Russia. A team of 1 athlete was announced to represent the country in the event.

== Results ==
(q – qualified, NM – no mark, SB – season best)

=== Men ===
Athlete	Event	Preliminaries		Heats		Semifinals		Final	
Athlete	Event	Time	Rank	Time	Rank	Time	Rank	Time	Rank
Faresa Kapisi	100 metres	11.21	19 PB	did not advance					
