= France at the 2007 World Championships in Athletics =

- WA code: FRA
- National federation: Fédération Française d'Athlétisme

in Osaka
- Competitors: 54 (26 men and 28 women)
- Medals: Gold 0 Silver 2 Bronze 0 Total 2

World Championships in Athletics appearances
- 1976; 1980; 1983; 1987; 1991; 1993; 1995; 1997; 1999; 2001; 2003; 2005; 2007; 2009; 2011; 2013; 2015; 2017; 2019; 2022; 2023; 2025

France has been represented by 54 athletes at the 2007 World Championships in Athletics. Romain Mesnil (pole vault) and Yohann Diniz (50 km walk) won France's two silver medals. France sent a young squad, with 29 of the 54 total athletes under 25 years old (53%).

== Team ==
The 23 athletes with the best marks were:

- Christine Arron : 100 m, 200 m, 4 × 100 m
- Muriel Hurtis-Houairi : 200 m, 4 × 100 m
- Adrianna Lamalle : 100 m haies, 4 × 100 m
- Sophie Duarte : 3000 m steeple
- Julie Coulaud : 3000 m steeple
- Élodie Olivares : 3000 m steeple
- Melanie Skotnik : HJ
- Vanessa Boslak : PV
- Eunice Barber : LJ
- Teresa Nzola Meso Ba : TJ
- Manuela Montebrun : HT
- Marie Collonvillé : Heptathlon
- David Alerte : 200 m, 4 × 100 m
- Mehdi Baala : 1500 m
- Ladji Doucouré : 110 m hs
- Bouabdellah Tahri : 3000 m steeple
- Mahiedine Mekhissi-Benabbad : 3000 m steeple
- Vincent Zouaoui Dandrieux : 3000 m steeple
- Romain Mesnil : PV
- Romain Barras : Decathlon
- Yohann Diniz : 50 km walk
- Eddy Riva : 50 km walk
- David Boulanger : 50 km walk

Then, there are 12 athletes with good marks at the National Championships or with IAAF-Standard-A

- Solen Désert : 400 m, 4 × 400 m
- Maria Martins : 1500 m
- Mélina Robert-Michon : DT
- Amélie Perrin : HT
- Eddy De Lépine : 200 m, 4 × 100 m
- Leslie Djhone : 400 m, 4 × 400 m
- Mounir Yemmouni : 1500 m
- Bano Traoré : 110 m hs
- Naman Keïta : 400 hs, 4 × 400 m (testosterone case announced by IAAF)
- Jérôme Clavier : PV
- Julien Kapek : TJ
- Yves Niaré : SP
