= 2007 World Championships in Athletics =

Athletics competition in Osaka, Japan

- Host city: Osaka, Japan
- Nations: 199
- Athletes: 1,817
- Events: 47
- Dates: 24 August – 2 September 2007
- Opened by: Emperor Akihito
- Closed by: IAAF President Lamine Diack
- Main venue: Nagai Stadium

The 11th World Championships in Athletics, (Japanese: 2007年世界陸上競技選手権大会) under the auspices of the International Association of Athletics Federations (IAAF), were held at Nagai Stadium in Osaka, Japan from 24 August to 2 September 2007. 200 of the IAAF's 212 member federations entered a total of 1,978 athletes, the greatest number of competitors at any World Championships to date. Sarah Brightman, the world's best-selling soprano, performed her single Running at the opening ceremony.

== Bidding process ==
Having bid unsuccessfully to host the 2008 Summer Olympics, Osaka was one of three cities to express an interest in hosting the 2007 World Championships alongside Budapest, Hungary and Berlin, Germany. By the IAAF's October 1, 2002 deadline, Budapest and Berlin had both withdrawn their bids, and Osaka was announced as the host city on November 15, 2002, as the sole remaining candidate. Berlin later bid successfully for the 2009 World Championships.

== Major themes ==
=== Doping concerns ===
The IAAF stepped up its "war on doping" at the Osaka games, and for the first time, the number of drug tests exceeded 1,000. The IAAF lobbied the World Anti-Doping Agency to adopt stiffer penalties for first-time doping offences in WADA's code of practice. Before the Championships, former Olympic champion Ed Moses had voiced concerns about the extent of doping in the sport, and had even predicted that a medallist at the event would be found to have taken a banned substance. Despite these fears, the IAAF announced that only one of the samples taken over the course of the Championships was "suspicious" and required more examination. The governing body refused to elaborate further until more was known, but the French hurdler Naman Keïta admitted to having failed a drug test. The IAAF later confirmed that Keïta had tested positive for testosterone in an out-of-competition test at a training camp, and labelled the World Championships 'drug-free'.

=== Weather conditions ===
The Championships were held during an unseasonably hot summer in Japan, in contrast to the cool, wet and windy conditions of Helsinki two years earlier. Temperatures earlier in the month had reached 40 °C (104 °F), killing several people. Temperatures had eased somewhat by the start of the event, but with early-morning temperatures around 30 °C and humidity high, the IAAF maintained a colour-coded advisory scale warning of the risk of heat stroke. Casualties of the heat were not as high as initially feared, but dozens of athletes failed to finish the walks and marathons and a few did require medical treatment. Some athletes in shorter events blamed poor performances on the difficult conditions.

=== Attendance ===
Concerns had been raised in the week running up to the Championships about the low level of ticket sales – only 46% of seats had been filled by August 20. The Nagai Stadium was less than half full for the opening ceremony, and there were around 15,000 empty seats on the night of the men's 100 m final. A number of reasons were cited for the poor attendance, including high ticket prices (especially since the streets were lined during the marathons), the hot weather and the disappointing performance of the Japanese team. IAAF vice-president Sebastian Coe also suggested that the length of the Championships may have to be shortened in future to sustain the public's interest.

=== Notable performances ===
Despite no world records being broken, the Championships saw a number of significant personal and team achievements. The United States dominated the overall standings ahead of Kenya and Russia, equalling its best ever medal haul (first achieved in 1991) with 26, fourteen of them golds. The U.S. also set another Championship first by triumphing in all four relay races. These accomplishments were highlighted by three individual performances: Tyson Gay and Allyson Felix collected three gold medals each (Gay in the 100 and 200 metres and the 4 × 100 m relay, Felix in the 200 m and the two women's relays), a feat previously achieved only by Marita Koch, Carl Lewis and Maurice Greene; while Kenyan-born Bernard Lagat became the first man to win both the 1500 and 5000 m titles at the same World Championships. Perhaps the most unlikely American medal came from 110 m hurdler David Payne, who as first alternate had not travelled to Osaka with the rest of the team. After Dominique Arnold withdrew from the event with an injury, Payne only arrived in Japan the night before the heats, and proceeded to move through the rounds before taking bronze with a personal best.

Amongst prominent European successes were Swede Carolina Klüft's third consecutive world heptathlon title with a European record score, the victory of 39-year-old German Franka Dietzsch in the discus, which made her the second-oldest world champion ever and Nelson Évora's win in the triple jump, beating world-leading Brazilian Jadel Gregorio and defending champion Walter Davis. Christine Ohuruogu of Great Britain and Northern Ireland claimed a surprise gold in the women's 400 metres, less than a month after the expiry of a year-long ban imposed for missing three drug tests, while high jumper Kyriakos Ioannou claimed the first ever medal for Cyprus in a World Championships. Russia's Tatyana Lebedeva just missed out on an unprecedented long jump/triple jump double, but still ended up with a gold and a silver medal.

African countries were typically well represented in the middle and long-distance events, with Kenyans claiming both the men's and women's marathon titles and Ethiopia winning three golds.

Chinese athlete Liu Xiang, the only sprinter of non-African origin to clock sub-13 second 110m hurdles, took the gold medal at this event with a time of 12.95 seconds.

World Record Holders for the 20 km Walk, Jefferson Pérez, and 50 km Walk, Nathan Deakes, both won their respective events, confirming their dominance of the event. In Perez's case, this was his third World Championship Gold Medal in a row.

Host nation Japan gained its only medal on the final day with a bronze for Reiko Tosa in the women's marathon.

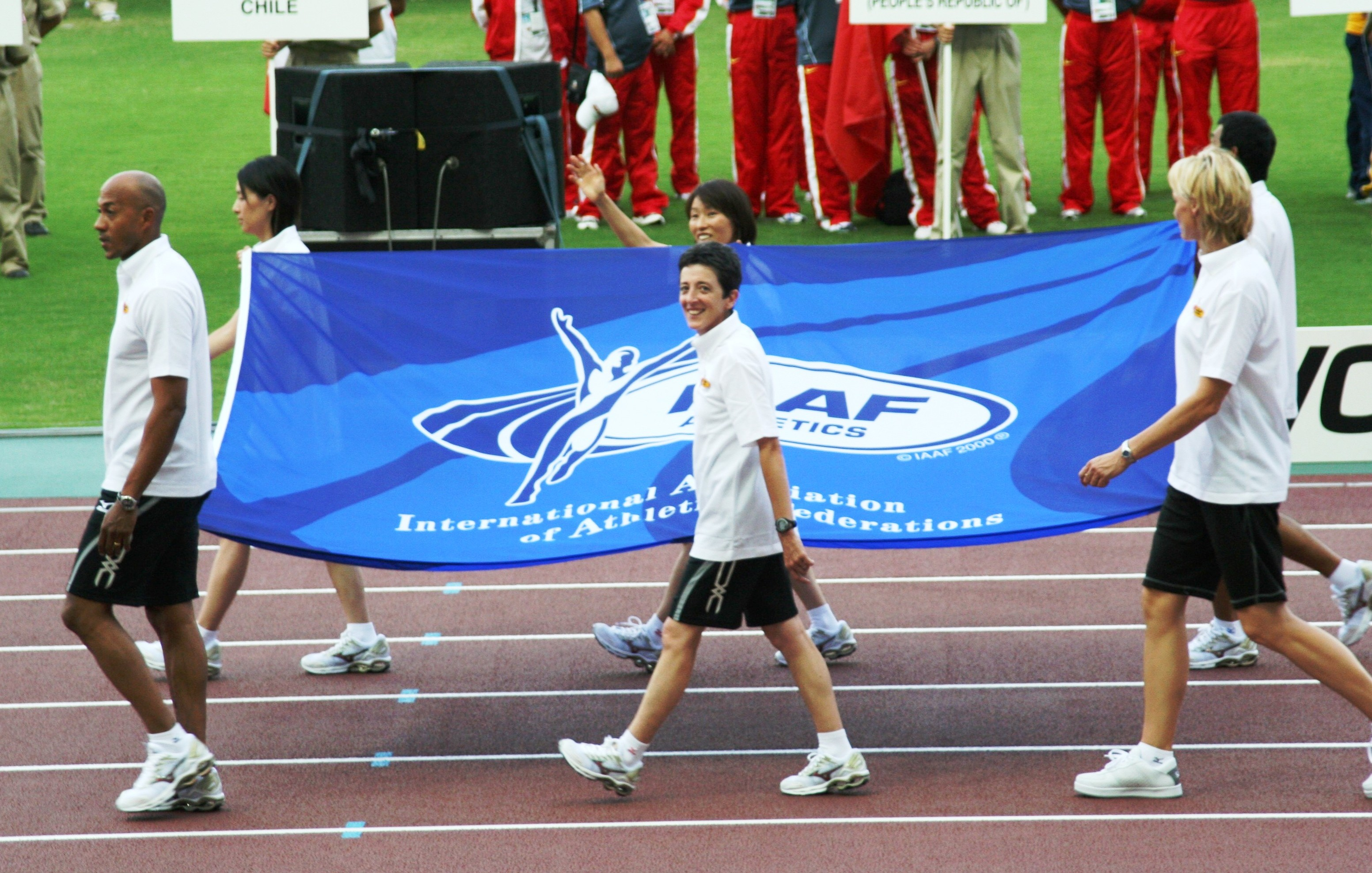
From opening ceremony

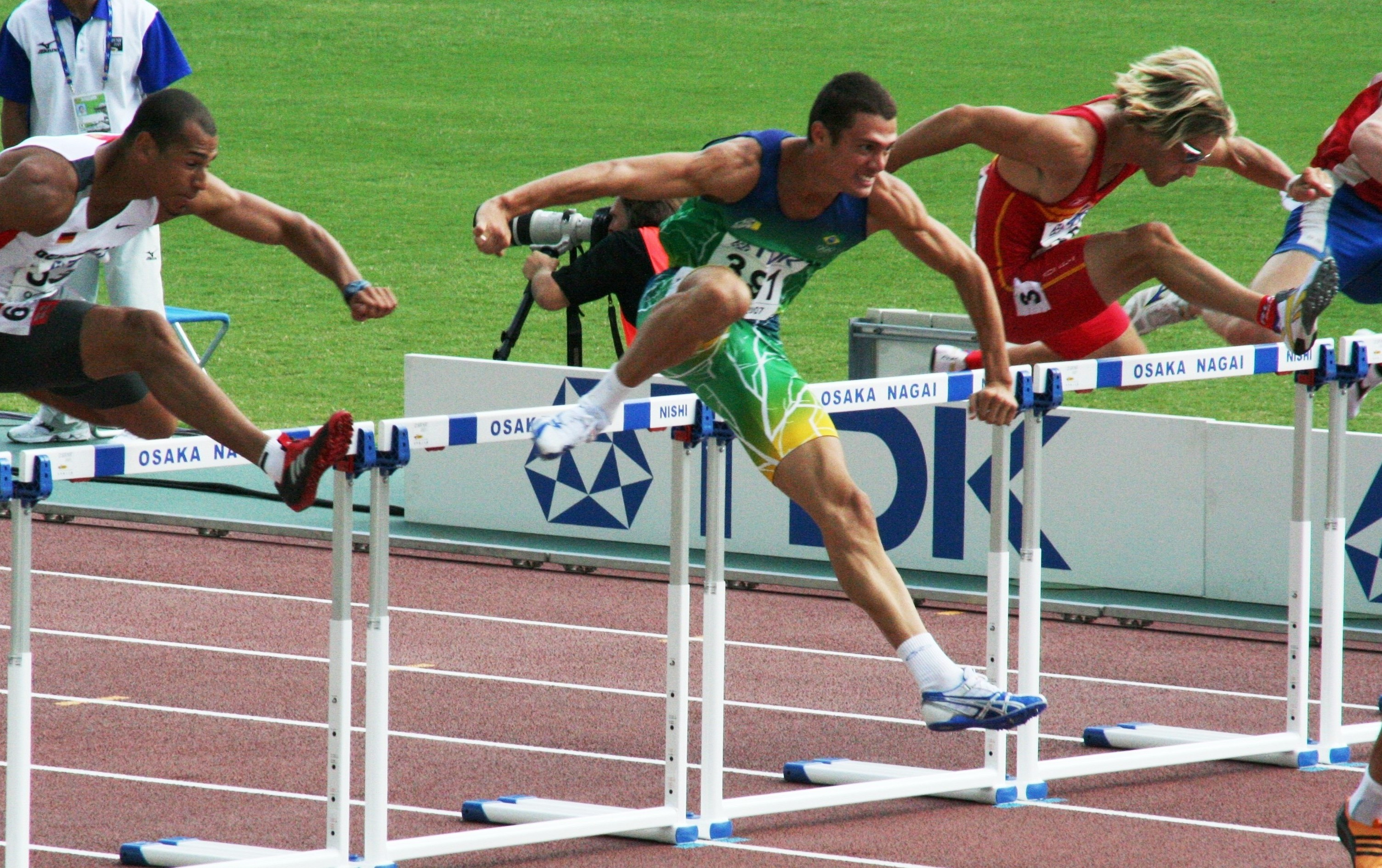
110 m hurdles heat in the men's decathlon

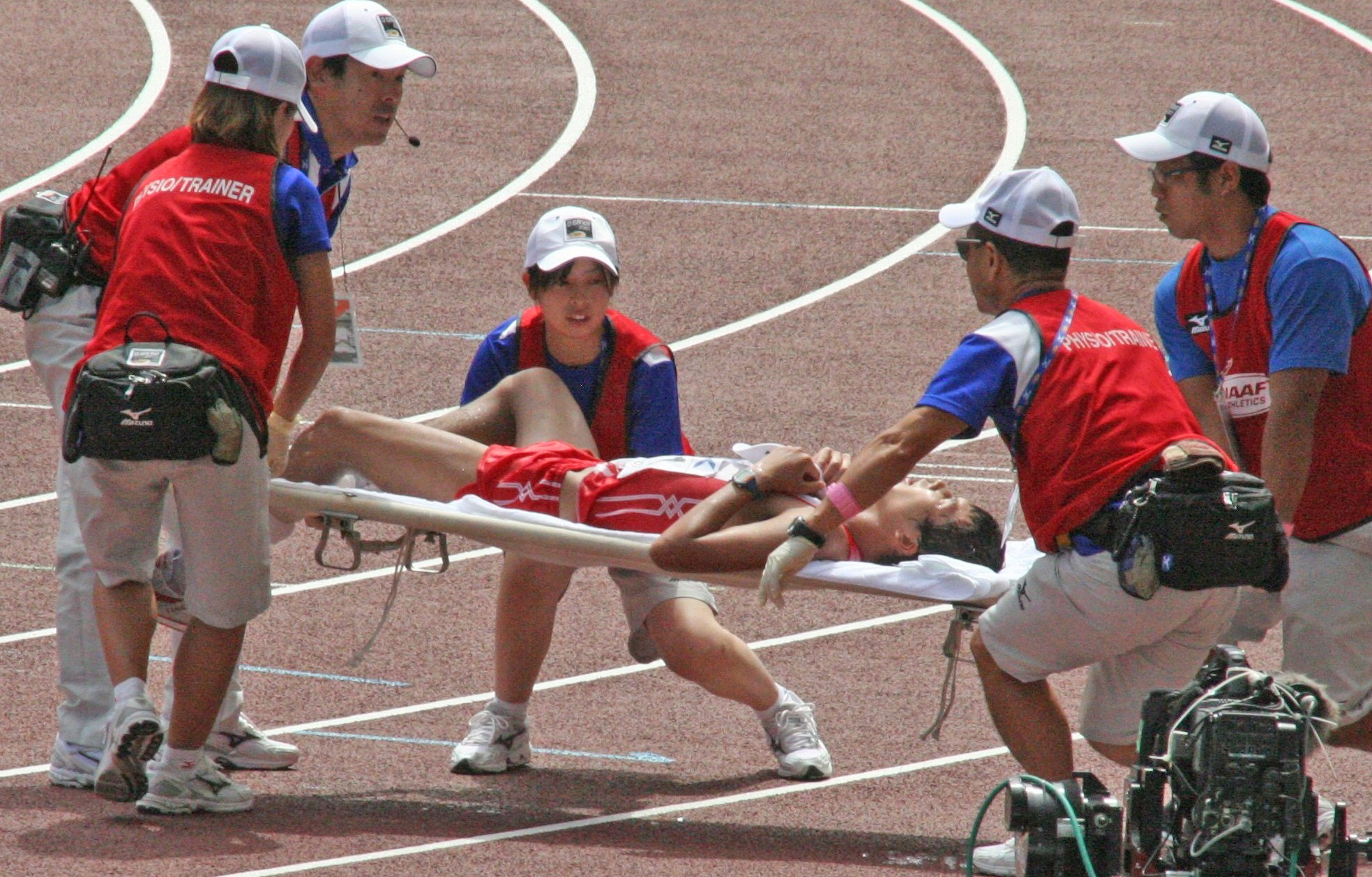
Japanese athlete is carried away after the 50 km walk.

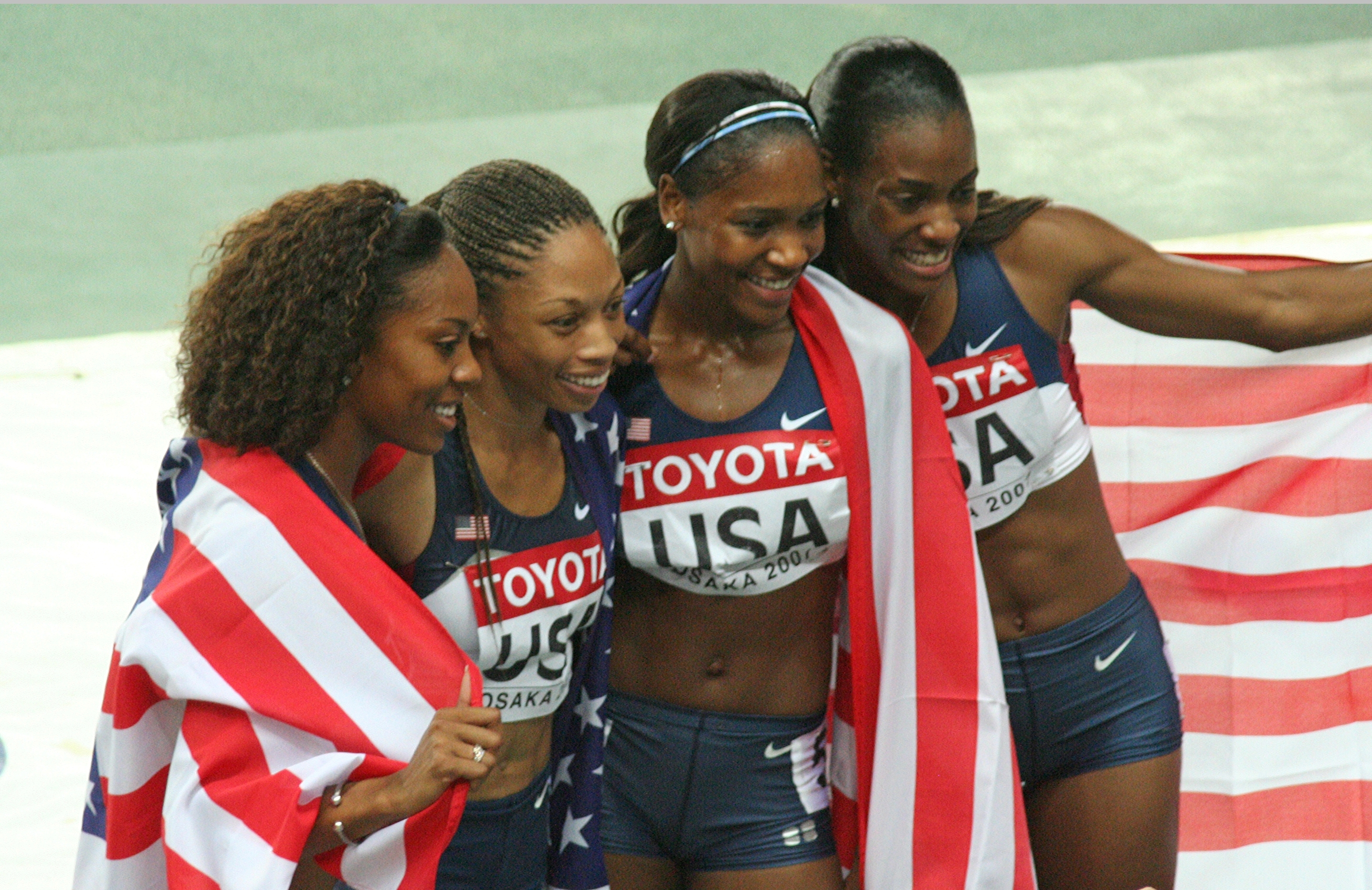
American women's 4 × 400 m relay team celebrate.

== Participating Nations ==
- Afghanistan (2)
- Albania (1)
- Algeria (10)
- American Samoa (1)
- Andorra (2)
- Angola (2)
- Anguilla (2)
- Antigua and Barbuda (2)
- Argentina (6)
- Armenia (1)
- Australia (44)
- Austria (3)
- Azerbaijan (1)
- Bahamas (16)
- Bahrain (10)
- Bangladesh (1)
- Barbados (2)
- Belarus (27)
- Belgium (17)
- Belize (2)
- Benin (2)
- Bolivia (2)
- Bosnia and Herzegovina (2)
- Botswana (8)
- Brazil (42)
- British Virgin Islands (1)
- Brunei (1)
- Bulgaria (10)
- Burkina Faso (2)
- Burundi (2)
- Cambodia (2)
- Cameroon (2)
- Canada (24)
- Cape Verde (2)
- Cayman Islands (1)
- Central African Republic (2)
- Chad (2)
- Chile (1)
- China (54)
- Chinese Taipei (3)
- Colombia (7)
- Democratic Republic of the Congo (2)
- Cook Islands (2)
- Costa Rica (2)
- Croatia (4)
- Cuba (32)
- Cyprus (2)
- Czech Republic (21)
- Denmark (5)
- Djibouti (2)
- Dominica (1)
- Dominican Republic (5)
- Ecuador (7)
- Egypt (4)
- El Salvador (2)
- Equatorial Guinea (2)
- Eritrea (4)
- Estonia (10)
- Ethiopia (32)
- Fiji (2)
- Finland (24)
- France (45)
- French Polynesia (2)
- Gabon (2)
- The Gambia (2)
- Georgia (1)
- Germany (56)
- Ghana (6)
- Gibraltar (1)
- Great Britain and Northern Ireland (50)
- Greece (25)
- Grenada (3)
- Guam (2)
- Guatemala (1)
- Guinea (1)
- Guinea-Bissau (2)
- Guyana (3)
- Haiti (3)
- Honduras (2)
- Hong Kong (2)
- Hungary (11)
- Iceland (1)
- India (10)
- Indonesia (2)
- Iran (2)
- Iraq (1)
- Ireland (15)
- Israel (7)
- Italy (34)
- Ivory Coast (2)
- Jamaica (42)
- Japan (77)
- Jordan (1)
- Kazakhstan (15)
- Kenya (37)
- Kiribati (2)
- Kuwait (2)
- Laos (1)
- Latvia (11)
- Lebanon (1)
- Lesotho (2)
- Liberia (1)
- Libya (1)
- Liechtenstein (2)
- Lithuania (6)
- Macau (2)
- Macedonia (2)
- Madagascar (2)
- Malawi (2)
- Malaysia (1)
- Maldives (2)
- Mali (3)
- Malta (2)
- Mauritania (2)
- Mauritius (2)
- Mexico (24)
- Federated States of Micronesia (2)
- Moldova (3)
- Monaco (1)
- Mongolia (2)
- Montenegro (2)
- Montserrat (1)
- Morocco (29)
- Mozambique (2)
- Myanmar (2)
- Namibia (2)
- Nauru (2)
- Nepal (1)
- Netherlands (9)
- Netherlands Antilles (1)
- New Zealand (10)
- Nicaragua (2)
- Niger (1)
- Nigeria (22)
- Norfolk Island (1)
- Northern Mariana Islands (2)
- Norway (14)
- Pakistan (2)
- Palau (2)
- Palestine (2)
- Panama (2)
- Papua New Guinea (2)
- Paraguay (1)
- Peru (1)
- Philippines (1)
- Poland (48)
- Portugal (24)
- Puerto Rico (2)
- Qatar (12)
- Romania (29)
- Russia (101)
- Rwanda (2)
- Saint Kitts and Nevis (2)
- Saint Lucia (1)
- Saint Vincent and the Grenadines (2)
- Samoa (2)
- San Marino (2)
- São Tomé and Príncipe (1)
- Saudi Arabia (10)
- Senegal (3)
- Serbia (6)
- Seychelles (2)
- Sierra Leone (1)
- Singapore (2)
- Slovakia (18)
- Slovenia (13)
- Solomon Islands (2)
- Somalia (2)
- South Africa (26)
- South Korea (11)
- Spain (46)
- Sri Lanka (1)
- Sudan (6)
- Suriname (2)
- Swaziland (2)
- Sweden (29)
- Switzerland (12)
- Syria (1)
- Tajikistan (2)
- Tanzania (6)
- Thailand (2)
- Togo (1)
- Tonga (2)
- Trinidad and Tobago (9)
- Tunisia (3)
- Turkey (13)
- Turkmenistan (2)
- Uganda (9)
- Ukraine (42)
- United Arab Emirates (1)
- United States (130)
- Uruguay (2)
- Uzbekistan (4)
- Vanuatu (2)
- Venezuela (2)
- Virgin Islands (1)
- Yemen (2)
- Zambia (2)
- Zimbabwe (5)

== Men's results ==
=== Track ===
2003 | 2005 | 2007 | 2009 | 2011

Event	Gold		Silver		Bronze	
100 metres	Tyson Gay; United States (USA)	9.85	Derrick Atkins; Bahamas (BAH)	9.91 NR	Asafa Powell; Jamaica (JAM)	9.96
200 metres	Tyson Gay; United States (USA)	19.76 CR	Usain Bolt; Jamaica (JAM)	19.91	Wallace Spearmon; United States (USA)	20.05
400 metres	Jeremy Wariner; United States (USA)	43.45 WL PB	LaShawn Merritt; United States (USA)	43.96 PB	Angelo Taylor; United States (USA)	44.32
800 metres	Alfred Kirwa Yego; Kenya (KEN)	1:47.09	Gary Reed; Canada (CAN)	1:47.10	Yuriy Borzakovskiy; Russia (RUS)	1:47.39
1500 metres	Bernard Lagat; United States (USA)	3:34.77	Rashid Ramzi; Bahrain (BHR)	3:35.00 SB	Shedrack Kibet Korir; Kenya (KEN)	3:35.04
5000 metres	Bernard Lagat; United States (USA)	13:45.87	Eliud Kipchoge; Kenya (KEN)	13:46.00	Moses Kipsiro; Uganda (UGA)	13:46.75
10,000 metres	Kenenisa Bekele; Ethiopia (ETH)	27:05.90 SB	Sileshi Sihine; Ethiopia (ETH)	27:09.03	Martin Mathathi; Kenya (KEN)	27:12.17
Marathon	Luke Kibet; Kenya (KEN)	2:15:59	Mubarak Hassan Shami; Qatar (QAT)	2:17:18	Viktor Röthlin; Switzerland (SUI)	2:17:25
110 metres hurdles	Liu Xiang; China (CHN)	12.95	Terrence Trammell; United States (USA)	12.99	David Payne; United States (USA)	13.02 PB
400 metres hurdles	Kerron Clement; United States (USA)	47.61 WL	Félix Sánchez; Dominican Republic (DOM)	48.01 SB	Marek Plawgo; Poland (POL)	48.12 NR
3000 metres steeplechase	Brimin Kipruto; Kenya (KEN)	8:13.82	Ezekiel Kemboi; Kenya (KEN)	8:16.94	Richard Mateelong; Kenya (KEN)	8:17.59
20 kilometres walk	Jefferson Pérez; Ecuador (ECU)	1:22:20	Paquillo Fernández; Spain (ESP)	1:22:40	Hatem Ghoula; Tunisia (TUN)	1:22:40
50 kilometres walk	Nathan Deakes; Australia (AUS)	3:43:53 SB	Yohann Diniz; France (FRA)	3:44:22 SB	Alex Schwazer; Italy (ITA)	3:44:38
4 × 100 metres relay	United States; Darvis Patton; Wallace Spearmon; Tyson Gay; Leroy Dixon; Rodney Martin*	37.78 WL	Jamaica; Marvin Anderson; Usain Bolt; Nesta Carter; Asafa Powell; Dwight Thomas*; Steve Mullings*	37.89 NR	Great Britain & N.I. Christian Malcolm; Craig Pickering; Marlon Devonish; Mark Lewis-Francis	37.90 SB
4 × 400 metres relay	United States; LaShawn Merritt; Angelo Taylor; Darold Williamson; Jeremy Wariner; Bershawn Jackson*; Kerron Clement*	2:55.56 WL	Bahamas; Avard Moncur; Michael Mathieu; Andrae Williams; Chris Brown; Nathaniel McKinney*	2:59.18 SB	Poland; Marek Plawgo; Daniel Dąbrowski; Marcin Marciniszyn; Kacper Kozłowski; Rafał Wieruszewski*; Witold Bańka*	3:00.05 SB
WR world record | AR area record | CR championship record | GR games record | NR national record | OR Olympic record | PB personal best | SB season best | WL world leading (in a given season)

Note: * Indicates athletes who ran in preliminary rounds.

=== Field ===
2003 | 2005 | 2007 | 2009 | 2011

Event	Gold		Silver		Bronze	
High jump	Donald Thomas; Bahamas (BAH)	2.35 WL	Yaroslav Rybakov; Russia (RUS)	2.35 WL	Kyriakos Ioannou; Cyprus (CYP)	2.35 WL
Pole vault	Brad Walker; United States (USA)	5.86	Romain Mesnil; France (FRA)	5.86 SB	Danny Ecker; Germany (GER)	5.81
Long jump	Irving Saladino; Panama (PAN)	8.57 AR	Andrew Howe; Italy (ITA)	8.47 NR	Dwight Phillips; United States (USA)	8.30
Triple jump	Nelson Évora; Portugal (POR)	17.74 NR	Jadel Gregório; Brazil (BRA)	17.59	Walter Davis; United States (USA)	17.33 SB
Shot put	Reese Hoffa; United States (USA)	22.04	Adam Nelson; United States (USA)	21.61 SB	Rutger Smith; Netherlands (NED)	21.13
Shot put	Reese Hoffa; United States (USA)	22.04	Adam Nelson; United States (USA)	21.61 SB	Andrei Mikhnevich; Belarus (BLR)	21.27
Discus throw	Gerd Kanter; Estonia (EST)	68.94	Robert Harting; Germany (GER)	66.68	Rutger Smith; Netherlands (NED)	66.42
Javelin throw	Tero Pitkämäki; Finland (FIN)	90.33	Andreas Thorkildsen; Norway (NOR)	88.61	Breaux Greer; United States (USA)	86.21
Hammer throw	Ivan Tsikhan; Belarus (BLR)	83.63 WL	Primož Kozmus; Slovenia (SLO)	82.29	Libor Charfreitag; Slovakia (SVK)	81.60 SB
Decathlon	Roman Šebrle; Czech Republic (CZE)	8676	Maurice Smith; Jamaica (JAM)	8644 NR	Dmitriy Karpov; Kazakhstan (KAZ)	8586 SB
WR world record | AR area record | CR championship record | GR games record | NR national record | OR Olympic record | PB personal best | SB season best | WL world leading (in a given season)

== Women's results ==
=== Track ===
2003 | 2005 | 2007 | 2009 | 2011

Event	Gold		Silver		Bronze	
100 metres	Veronica Campbell; Jamaica (JAM)	11.01	Lauryn Williams; United States (USA)	11.01 SB	Carmelita Jeter; United States (USA)	11.02 PB
200 metres	Allyson Felix; United States (USA)	21.81 WL	Veronica Campbell; Jamaica (JAM)	22.34 SB	Susanthika Jayasinghe; Sri Lanka (SRI)	22.63
400 metres	Christine Ohuruogu; Great Britain & N.I. (GBR)	49.61 PB	Nicola Sanders; Great Britain & N.I. (GBR)	49.65 PB	Novlene Williams; Jamaica (JAM)	49.66 SB
800 metres	Janeth Jepkosgei; Kenya (KEN)	1:56.04 WL	Hasna Benhassi; Morocco (MAR)	1:56.99	Mayte Martínez; Spain (ESP)	1:57.62 PB
1500 metres	Maryam Yusuf Jamal; Bahrain (BHR)	3:58.75 SB	Iryna Lishchynska; Ukraine (UKR)	4:00.69 SB	Daniela Yordanova; Bulgaria (BUL)	4:00.82 SB
1500 metres	Maryam Yusuf Jamal; Bahrain (BHR)	3:58.75 SB	Yelena Soboleva; Russia (RUS)	3:58.99	Daniela Yordanova; Bulgaria (BUL)	4:00.82 SB
5000 metres	Meseret Defar; Ethiopia (ETH)	14:57.91	Vivian Cheruiyot; Kenya (KEN)	14:58.50	Priscah Jepleting Cherono; Kenya (KEN)	14:59.21
10,000 metres	Tirunesh Dibaba; Ethiopia (ETH)	31:55.41 SB	Kara Goucher; United States (USA)	32:02.05 SB	Jo Pavey; Great Britain & N.I. (GBR)	32:03.81
10,000 metres	Tirunesh Dibaba; Ethiopia (ETH)	31:55.41 SB	Elvan Abeylegesse; Turkey (TUR)	31:59.40	Jo Pavey; Great Britain & N.I. (GBR)	32:03.81
Marathon	Catherine Ndereba; Kenya (KEN)	2:30:37	Zhou Chunxiu; China (CHN)	2:30:45	Reiko Tosa; Japan (JPN)	2:30:55
100 metres hurdles	Michelle Perry; United States (USA)	12.46	Perdita Felicien; Canada (CAN)	12.49 SB	Delloreen Ennis-London; Jamaica (JAM)	12.50 PB
400 metres hurdles	Jana Rawlinson; Australia (AUS)	53.31 SB	Yuliya Pechenkina; Russia (RUS)	53.50 SB	Anna Jesień; Poland (POL)	53.92
3000 metres steeplechase	Yekaterina Volkova; Russia (RUS)	9:06.57 CR PB	Tatyana Petrova; Russia (RUS)	9:09.19 PB	Eunice Jepkorir; Kenya (KEN)	9:20.09
20 kilometres walk	Olga Kaniskina; Russia (RUS)	1:30:09	Tatyana Shemyakina; Russia (RUS)	1:30:42	María Vasco; Spain (ESP)	1:30:47
4 × 100 metres relay	United States; Lauryn Williams; Allyson Felix; Mikele Barber; Torri Edwards; Carmelita Jeter*; Mechelle Lewis*	41.98 WL	Jamaica; Sheri-Ann Brooks; Kerron Stewart; Simone Facey; Veronica Campbell; Shelly-Ann Fraser*	42.01 SB	Belgium; Olivia Borlée; Hanna Mariën; Élodie Ouédraogo; Kim Gevaert	42.75 NR
4 × 400 metres relay	United States; DeeDee Trotter; Allyson Felix; Mary Wineberg; Sanya Richards; Monique Hennagan*; Natasha Hastings*	3:18.55 WL	Jamaica; Shericka Williams; Shereefa Lloyd; Davita Prendergast; Novlene Williams; Anastasia Le-Roy*	3:19.73 NR	Great Britain & N.I. Christine Ohuruogu; Marilyn Okoro; Lee McConnell; Nicola Sanders; Donna Fraser*	3:20.04 NR
WR world record | AR area record | CR championship record | GR games record | NR national record | OR Olympic record | PB personal best | SB season best | WL world leading (in a given season)

Note: * Indicates athletes who ran in preliminary rounds.

=== Field ===
2003 | 2005 | 2007 | 2009 | 2011

Event	Gold		Silver		Bronze	
High jump	Blanka Vlašić; Croatia (CRO)	2.05	Antonietta Di Martino; Italy (ITA); Anna Chicherova; Russia (RUS)	2.03 NR; 2.03 PB		
High jump	After an outstanding season, Vlašić was the big favourite coming into the final, and she did not disappoint. Di Martino and Chicherova gave the Croatian a run for her money though, as they both cleared 2.03 and shared second place. With Russians Slesarenko and Savchenko both clearing 2.00, this was the first ever women's high jump competition with 5 jumpers over 2.00 and also the first ever with 3 jumpers clearing 2.03.					
Pole vault	Yelena Isinbayeva; Russia (RUS)	4.80	Kateřina Baďurová; Czech Republic (CZE)	4.75; NR	Svetlana Feofanova; Russia (RUS)	4.75
Pole vault	Isinbayeva was the only one to vault over 4.80 m. Then she attacked the world record trying to jump 5.02 m, but failed. Three athletes beat the height of 4.75 m, but only Baďurová succeeded with her first attempt, taking silver. Feofanova took bronze, beating Monika Pyrek thanks to her better first attempt on 4.70 m.					
Long jump	Tatyana Lebedeva; Russia (RUS)	7.03	Lyudmila Kolchanova; Russia (RUS)	6.92	Tatyana Kotova; Russia (RUS)	6.90; SB
Long jump	Lebedeva twice jumped 7.03 m to head a Russian clean sweep of the medals.					
Triple jump	Yargelis Savigne; Cuba (CUB)	15.28; WL	Tatyana Lebedeva; Russia (RUS)	15.07	Marija Šestak; Slovenia (SLO)	14.72
Triple jump	Lebedeva's dominance of the event and her hopes of an unprecedented long jump/triple jump double were ended by Savigne, whose opening jump of 15.28 m proved decisive.					
Shot put	Valerie Vili; New Zealand (NZL)	20.54; WL / AR	Nadine Kleinert; Germany (GER)	19.77; SB	Li Ling; China (CHN)	19.38; PB
Shot put	Astapchuk lead throughout the rounds but Vili responded in the final round with a 20.54 throw. Astapchuk's last round effort of 20.48 was not enough to catch the New Zealander, who set a Commonwealth record.					
Discus throw	Franka Dietzsch; Germany (GER)	66.61	Yarelis Barrios; Cuba (CUB)	63.90; PB	Nicoleta Grasu; Romania (ROU)	63.40
Discus throw	Dietzsch's opening effort of 66.61 m proved enough to secure the gold medal for the third time in her career. At 39, she became the second-oldest athletics world champion in history. Darya Pishchalnikova initially finished second, but her silver medal was revoked in 2008 for manipulating drug samples.					
Javelin throw	Barbora Špotáková; Czech Republic (CZE)	67.07; NR	Christina Obergföll; Germany (GER)	66.46	Steffi Nerius; Germany (GER)	64.42
Javelin throw	The final was a battle between two pairs of German and Czech throwers which ended with a loss for this year unbeaten Obergföll. Špotáková improved the Czech national record (previously 66.21 held by herself since 2006) twice. She took an early lead for 66.40 m in her first attempt and secured the gold medal with her third throw (67.07) before Obergföll who reached 66.46 in the sixth attempt. Both Špotáková and Obergföl had a solid row of attempts over 60 m. Nerius (64.42) managed to get the bronze when she overcame Nikola Brejchová (63.73) in the fourth round.					
Hammer throw	Betty Heidler; Germany (GER)	74.76	Yipsi Moreno; Cuba (CUB)	74.74	Zhang Wenxiu; China (CHN)	74.39
Hammer throw	In a tight contest, Moreno's final round throw fell just 2 cm short of Heidler's 74.76, set in round two. Ivana Brkljačić failed to follow up on her qualification-leading throw of 74.69 and had to settle with 11th place.					
Heptathlon	Carolina Klüft; Sweden (SWE)	7032; WL / AR	Lyudmila Blonska; Ukraine (UKR)	6832; NR	Kelly Sotherton; Great Britain & N.I. (Great Britain and N.I.)	6510; SB
Heptathlon	Klüft set a European Record and became the second highest scorer ever in taking her third consecutive World Championship title and 19th consecutive heptathlon win. Sotherton had to fight with Jessica Ennis for a medal in the 800 m, after a poor javelin. Ennis won the 800 metres by only 0.19 seconds which was not enough, giving her the fourth place after Sotherton.					
WR world record | AR area record | CR championship record | GR games record | NR national record | OR Olympic record | PB personal best | SB season best | WL world leading (in a given season)

== Medal table ==
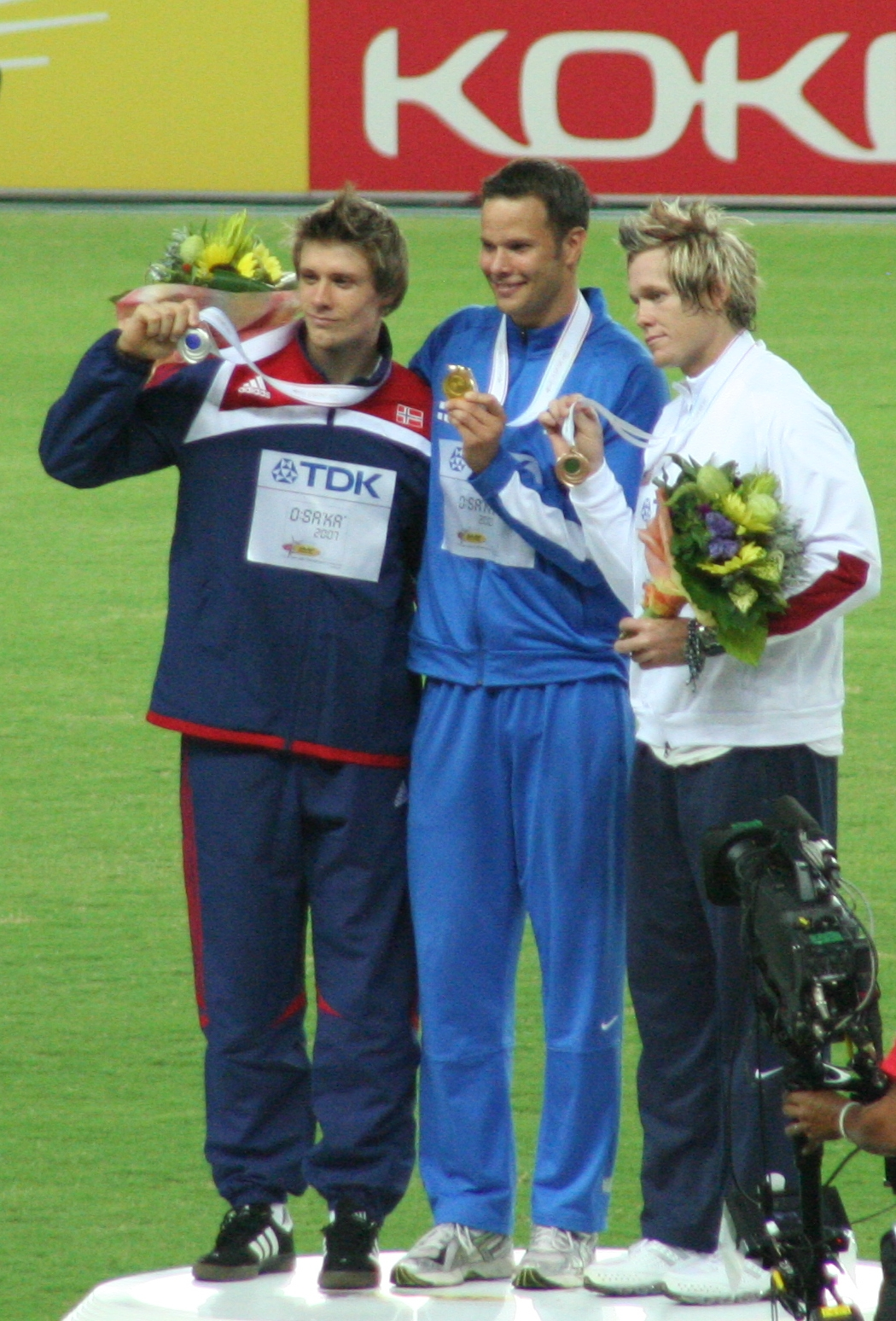
The victory ceremony for the men's javelin

* Host nation (Japan)

Rank	Nation	Gold	Silver	Bronze	Total
1	United States	14	5	7	26
2	Kenya	5	3	5	13
3	Russia	4	7	3	14
4	Ethiopia	3	1	0	4
5	Germany	2	3	2	7
6	Czech Republic	2	1	0	3
7	Australia	2	0	0	2
8	Jamaica	1	6	3	10
9	Bahamas	1	2	0	3
9	Cuba	1	2	0	3
11	Great Britain & N.I.	1	1	4	6
12	China	1	1	2	4
13	Bahrain	1	1	0	2
14	Belarus	1	0	0	1
14	Croatia	1	0	0	1
14	Ecuador	1	0	0	1
14	Estonia	1	0	0	1
14	Finland	1	0	0	1
14	New Zealand	1	0	0	1
14	Panama	1	0	0	1
14	Portugal	1	0	0	1
14	Sweden	1	0	0	1
23	Italy	0	2	1	3
24	Canada	0	2	0	2
24	France	0	2	0	2
24	Ukraine	0	2	0	2
27	Spain	0	1	2	3
28	Slovenia	0	1	1	2
29	Brazil	0	1	0	1
29	Dominican Republic	0	1	0	1
29	Morocco	0	1	0	1
29	Norway	0	1	0	1
29	Qatar	0	1	0	1
34	Poland	0	0	3	3
35	Netherlands	0	0	2	2
36	Belgium	0	0	1	1
36	Bulgaria	0	0	1	1
36	Cyprus	0	0	1	1
36	Japan*	0	0	1	1
36	Kazakhstan	0	0	1	1
36	Romania	0	0	1	1
36	Slovakia	0	0	1	1
36	Sri Lanka	0	0	1	1
36	Switzerland	0	0	1	1
36	Tunisia	0	0	1	1
36	Uganda	0	0	1	1
Totals (46 entries)		47	48	46	141

== Broadcasting ==
The broadcasters of the 2007 IAAF World Championships were as follows:

=== Japan ===
- Broadcaster – TBS (Host broadcaster) and MBS (Cooperator)
- Caster – Yūji Oda and Miho Nakai
- Fieldcaster – Beni Arashiro
- Official song – All my treasures (Yūji Oda)

=== Worldwide ===
This list is non-exhaustive.

- Arab World – Al Jazeera Sports
- Australia – SBS TV
- Belgium – Sporza
- Bosnia and Herzegovina – BHTV1
- Brazil – SporTV
- Bulgaria – BNT
- Canada – CBC
- Caribbean – CMC
- China – CCTV
- Croatia – HRT2
- Czech Republic – ČT2
- Denmark – DR2
- Estonia – ETV
- Europe – Eurosport
- Finland – YLE
- France – France Televisions
- Germany – ARD and ZDF
- Greece – ET1
- Israel – Channel 1
- Italy – RAI
- Latvia – LTV7
- Lithuania – LTV
- New Zealand – Sky Television
- Norway – NRK
- Philippines – NBN
- Poland – TVP
- Portugal – RTP2
- Russia – Sport-RTR
- Serbia – RTS2
- Slovakia – Dvojka
- South Korea – KBS
- Spain – TVE2
- Sweden – SVT1, 2, HD
- Switzerland – SRG-SSR
- Turkey – TRT
- United Kingdom – BBC
- United States – NBC, Versus and WCSN
- Venezuela – Meridiano TV
