= Canada at the 2007 World Championships in Athletics =

- WA code: CAN
- National federation: Athletics Canada

in Osaka
- Competitors: 30
- Medals: Gold 0 Silver 2 Bronze 0 Total 2

World Championships in Athletics appearances (overview)
- 1976; 1980; 1983; 1987; 1991; 1993; 1995; 1997; 1999; 2001; 2003; 2005; 2007; 2009; 2011; 2013; 2015; 2017; 2019; 2022; 2023; 2025

Canada competed at the 2007 World Championships in Athletics with 30 athletes. In order to qualify the athletes had met the world championship qualification standards. The qualification for the world Championship took place in early July at the Windsor Stadium in Windsor, Ontario. The highlighted event at the trials was the Woman's 100m Hurdles featuring "2003 World outdoor and indoor champion Perdita Felicien, Angela Whyte, and Priscilla Lopes who finished 1-3 respectively during the 2006 national championships". The Championships took place in Osaka, Japan in the Nagai Stadium and were the 11th World Championships held under the IAAF sanctions. The event lasted nine days spanning from August 25 to September 2.

== Summary ==
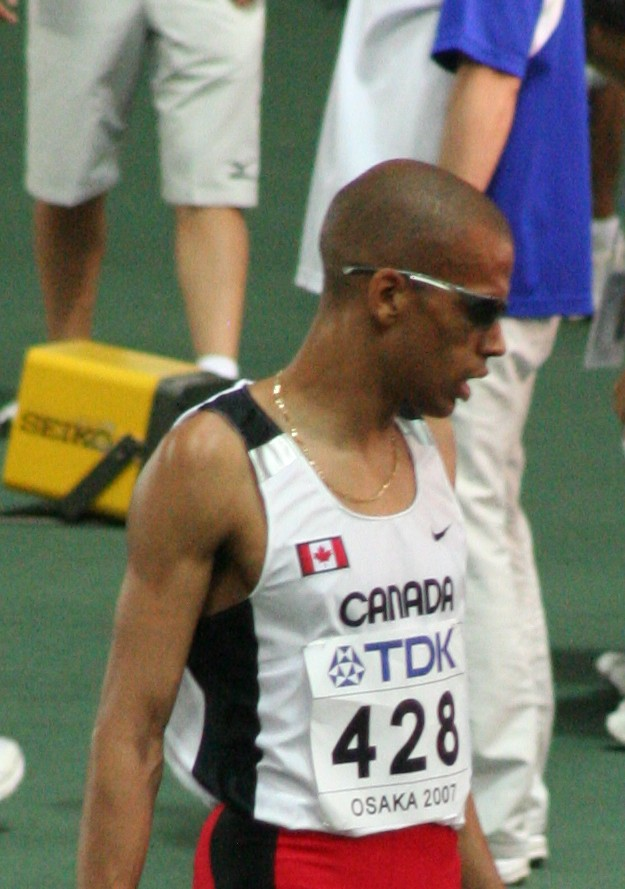
Canadian 800 m field's tracker Gary Reed on August 31, 2007, at the 2007 World Championships in Athletics in Osaka, Japan.

Three athletes brought home medals from the championships but only two were recognized under the IAAF. Gary Reeds was the favourite to watch going into the championships and brought home the silver medal in the Men's 800m. Reed held the Canadian record in the event with a time of 1:43.68 up until only recently in 2018 when it was broken by Brandon McBride. Reeds impressive performance at the championships captivated the Canadian Athletics fans back home, making it an "exciting moment in Canadian track and field history" The final in the 800m at the championship went out slow and Reed was leading at the bell with only 400m to go. The gold came down to the last two strides, Reed and Kirwa Yego fighting for the gold. With one of the closest margins for victory in world championship history, Yego managed to just out run Reed taking gold.

== Competitors ==
=== Men Qualifiers ===
100 m: Anson Henry

4 × 100 m relay: Richard Adu-Bobie, Bryan Barnett, Jared Connaughton, Anson Henry, Shannon King, Neville Wright

110 m hurdles: Jared MacLoed

200 m: Bryan Barnett

400 m: Tyler Christopher

400 m hurdles: Adam Kunkel

800 m: Gary Reed, Achraf Tadili

1500 m: Kevin Sullivan

10 000 m: Simon Bairu

50 km race walk: Tim Berrett

Hammer throw: Jim Steacy

Javelin throw: Scott Russell

Shot put: Dylan Armstrong

=== Women Qualifiers ===
100 m hurdles: Perdita Felicien, Priscilla Lopes, Angela White

800 m: Diane Cummins

1500 m: Carmen Douma-Hussar, Malindi Elmore, Hilary Stellingwerff

Marathon: Lioudmila Kortchaguina

Heptathlon: Jessica Zelinka

High Jump: Nicole Forrester

1500m Wheelchair (exhibition): Chantal Petitclerc, Diane Roy

== Final results ==
Position	Athlete	Event	Result	React	Notes
1st	Chantal Petitclerc	W 1500 m wheelchair	3.37.10	N/A	SB
2nd	Perdita Felicien	W 100 m hurdles	12.49	0.132	SB
2nd	Gary Reed	M 800 m	1.47.10	N/A	
6th	Tyler Christopher	M 400 m	44.71	0.169	
6th	Diane Roy	W 1500 m wheelchair	3.40.38	N/A	PB
8th	Angela Whyte	W 100 m hurdles	12.66	0.138	
9th	Dylan Armstrong	M Shot Put	20.23	N/A	

=== Results Legend ===
'Q': Automatic Qualifier, 'q': Fastest Loser Qualifier, '-': Did not qualify, 'DQ' - Disqualified, 'n/a' Not applicable, 'NMR': No Mark Recorded) SB: Season's Best, PB: Personal Best, 'EX': Exhibition event, does not count towards official medal count.

=== Medal Count ===
Canada received two medals at the World championships in Osaka both being silver. The gold medal won by Chantal Petitclerc in the Women's 1500m Wheelchair did not count in the total medal count. The event was not seen as an official event by the IAAF but as an exhibition event in the official rankings tables. Canada ranked 25th on the official medal table. Both Gary Reed and Perdita Felicien brought home silver in their respected events.

Position	Gold	Silver	Bronze	4th	5th	6th	7th	8th	9th	10th	11th - +	DNF/DNS/DQ	Points	Overall World Ranking
Numbers	0	2	0	0	0	1	0	1	1	0	4	3	18	T23

== See also ==
- Athletics Canada
- Sport in Canada
- 2007 World Championships in Athletics
