= American Samoa at the 2019 World Athletics Championships =

American Samoa at the 2019 World Championships in Athletics
- WA code: ASA

in Doha, Qatar 27 September 2019 – 6 October 2019
- Competitors: 1 (1 man and 0 women) in 1 event

World Championships in Athletics appearances
- 1987; 1991; 1993; 1995; 1997; 1999; 2001; 2003; 2005; 2007; 2009; 2011; 2013; 2015–2017; 2019; 2022; 2023

American Samoa competed at the 2019 World Athletics Championships in Doha, Qatar, from 27 September to 6 October 2019.

== Results ==
Athlete	Event	Preliminary		Heat		Semifinal		Final	
Athlete	Event	Result	Rank	Result	Rank	Result	Rank	Result	Rank
Nainoa Soto Thompson	100 metres	11.66	25	Did not advance					
