= American Samoa Track & Field Association =

Sports governing body in American Samoa

- Sport: Athletics
- Abbreviation: ASTFA
- Founded: 1976
- Affiliation: IAAF
- Affiliation date: 1986
- Regional affiliation: OAA
- Headquarters: Pago Pago, Tutuila
- President: Don Fuimaono Lutu
- Secretary: Deanna Fuimaono
- (American Samoa)

The American Samoa Track & Field Association (ASTFA) is the governing body for the sport of athletics in American Samoa.

== History ==
Athletes from American Samoa participated already at the 1969 and 1971 South Pacific Games.

ASTFA was founded in 1976, and was affiliated to the IAAF in the year 1986.

Current president is Don Fuimaono Lutu.

== Affiliations ==
- International Association of Athletics Federations (IAAF)
- Oceania Athletics Association (OAA)

Moreover, it is part of the following national organisations:

- American Samoa National Olympic Committee (ASNOC)

== National records ==
ASTFA maintains the American Samoan records in athletics.
