= Stocks and Securities Limited =

Financial services company in Jamaica

- Formerly: Atlas Publishers Limited, Paul Chen-Young & Company
- Company type: Privately held company
- Industry: Financial services
- Founded: 1973
- Founder: Paul Chen-Young
- Defunct: 2023
- Fate: Bankrupt after fraud
- Headquarters: Kingston, Jamaica
- Products: Stockbroker
- Website: www.sslinvest.com

Stocks and Securities Limited (SLL) was a financial services company in Jamaica. Originally known as Paul Chen-Young & Company. The company was implicated in a fraud scandal in 2023, which led to it declaring bankruptcy. It is now in receivership.

== History ==
The company was founded in 1973 as Atlas Publishers Limited. In 1977, it changed its name to Paul Chen-Young & Company Limited, when it entered the stock-brokering sector. Its founder was Paul Chen-Young, who had worked at the World Bank, Jamaica Development Bank, and Workers Bank. He also established his own consultancy firm, Paul Chen-Young Associates. One of the companies first activities was facilitating investment in government securities.

In 2006, the company name changed to Stocks and Securities Limited.

== Fraud scandal ==
On 11 January 2023, Usain Bolt became aware of discrepancies in his investment account with SSL, and on 12 January his manager Nugent Walker revealed this to the press. It was reported that a recently fired employee of SSL was implicated in the fraud, which included Bolt's funds. Later on 12 January, the Financial Services Commission of Jamaica issued instructions to SSL, informing it that it was now in enhanced oversight, while their investigation continued.

The Jamaica Observer reported that, a decade ago, Bolt had deposited $8 million USD with SSL, and in his most recent statement, that had increased to $10 million USD. The employee in question had apparently been employed by SSL for 25 years, and claimed to have taken $1.2 billion JMD to pay a family member's medical bills.
