= Sherwood Content =

- Small Town
- Location within Jamaica
- Coordinates: 18°23′26″N 77°37′49″W
- Country: Jamaica
- Parish: Trelawny Parish

Population
  - Estimate (2021): 1,499
- Time zone: UTC-5 (EST)

Sherwood Content is a small town in Trelawny Parish, Jamaica. It consists of two adjoining villages, Sherwood and Content. It is the home town of world record sprinter Usain Bolt. It contains the Sherwood Content Health Centre, a post office, Waldensia Baptist Church and Waldensia Primary School. Bolt has funded over $3 million in repairs to the health centre and gave the green light to a memorandum of understanding between the National People's Co-operative Bank (NPCB) and the Ministry of Health. The village contains a number of dilapidated 19th-century houses. William Knibb was reported to have shown an early interest in the area; Sherwood is associated with the Dawkins family.

== Notable people ==
- Usain Bolt, Jamaican athlete, Olympic gold medalist and world record sprinter
