= Austria at the World Athletics Championships =

- WA code: AUT
- National federation: Austrian Athletics Federation
- Website: www.oelv.at
- Medals Ranked 82nd: Gold 0 Silver 1 Bronze 3 Total 4

World Athletics Championships appearances (overview)
- 1983; 1987; 1991; 1993; 1995; 1997; 1999; 2001; 2003; 2005; 2007; 2009; 2011; 2013; 2015; 2017; 2019; 2022; 2023; 2025

Austria has participated in every edition of the World Athletics Championships since the inaugural event in 1983. Austria is 82nd on the all time medal table.

== Medalists ==
Medal	Name	Year	Event
Bronze	Sigrid Kirchmann	1993 Stuttgart	Women's high jump
Silver	Stephanie Graf	2001 Edmonton	Women's 800 metres
Bronze	Lukas Weißhaidinger	2019 Doha	Men's discus throw
Bronze	Verena Preiner	2019 Doha	Women's heptathlon

== Medal tables ==
=== By championships ===
Year	Gold	Silver	Bronze	Total
2001 Edmonton	0	1	0	1
2019 Doha	0	0	2	2
1993 Stuttgart	0	0	1	1
Totals (3 entries)	0	1	3	4

=== By event ===
Event	Gold	Silver	Bronze	Total
Middle distance	0	1	0	1
Combined events	0	0	1	1
Jumping	0	0	1	1
Throwing	0	0	1	1
Totals (4 entries)	0	1	3	4

=== By gender ===
Gender	Gold	Silver	Bronze	Total
Women	0	1	2	3
Men	0	0	1	1

== See also ==
- Austria at the Olympics
