= Austria at the 2025 World Athletics Championships =

- Flag of Austria
- WA code: AUT

in Tokyo, Japan 13−21 September 2025
- Competitors: 10 (5 men and 5 women)
- Medals: Gold 0 Silver 0 Bronze 0 Total 0

World Athletics Championships appearances (overview)
- 1983; 1987; 1991; 1993; 1995; 1997; 1999; 2001; 2003; 2005; 2007; 2009; 2011; 2013; 2015; 2017; 2019; 2022; 2023; 2025

Austria competed at the 2025 World Athletics Championships in Tokyo, Japan, from 13 to 21 September 2025.

== Results ==
Austria entered 10 athletes to the championships: 5 women and 5 men.

Key

- Q = Qualified for the next round
- q = Qualified for the next round as a fastest loser or, in field events, by position without achieving the qualifying target
- NR = National record
- PB = Personal best
- SB = Season best
- N/A = Round not applicable for the event

=== Men ===
Track and road events

Athlete	Event	Heat		Semifinal		Final	
Athlete	Event	Result	Rank	Result	Rank	Result	Rank
Raphael Pallitsch	1500 metres	3:42.40	6 Q	3:36.94	7	Did not advance	
Aaron Gruen	Marathon	—N/a				2:22:07	52
Enzo Diessl	110 metres hurdles	13.37	5 q	13.64	7	Did not advance	

Field events

Athlete	Event	Qualification		Final	
Athlete	Event	Distance	Position	Distance	Position
Endiorass Kingley	Triple jump	16.85 =NR	11 q	16.71	9
Lukas Weißhaidinger	Dicus throw	65.91	6 q	62.26	9

=== Women ===
Track and road events

Athlete	Event	Heat		Semifinal		Final	
Athlete	Event	Result	Rank	Result	Rank	Result	Rank
Susanne Gogl-Walli	400 metres	52.92	8	Did not advance			
Caroline Bredlinger	800 metres	2:00.25	5	Did not advance			
Julia Mayer	Marathon	—N/a				2:36:20 SB	33
Karin Strametz	100 metres hurdles	13.02	4	Did not advance			

Field events

Athlete	Event	Qualification		Final	
Athlete	Event	Distance	Position	Distance	Position
Victoria Hudson	Javelin throw	62.85	5 Q	59.52	10
