= Jamaica at the 2019 World Athletics Championships =

- WA code: JAM
- National federation: Jamaica Athletics Administrative Association
- Website: trackandfieldjm.com

in Doha, Qatar 27 September 2019 – 6 October 2019
- Competitors: 55 in 25 events
- Medals Ranked 3rd: Gold 3 Silver 5 Bronze 4 Total 12

World Athletics Championships appearances
- 1983; 1987; 1991; 1993; 1995; 1997; 1999; 2001; 2003; 2005; 2007; 2009; 2011; 2013; 2015; 2017; 2019; 2022; 2023

Jamaica competed at the 2019 World Athletics Championships in Doha, Qatar, from 27 September to 6 October 2019.

== Medalists ==
| Medal | Athlete | Event | Date |
|---|---|---|---|
| Gold | Tajay Gayle | Men's long jump | 28 September |
| Gold | Shelly-Ann Fraser-Pryce | Women's 100 m | 29 September |
| Gold | Natalliah Whyte; Shelly-Ann Fraser-Pryce; Jonielle Smith; Shericka Jackson; Natasha Morrison* | Women's 4 × 100 m relay | 5 October |
| Silver | Nathon Allen; Roneisha McGregor; Tiffany James; Javon Francis; Janieve Russell* | Mixed 4 × 400 m relay | 29 September |
| Silver | Fedrick Dacres | Men's discus throw | 30 September |
| Silver | Danniel Thomas-Dodd | Women's shot put | 3 October |
| Silver | Shanieka Ricketts | Women's triple jump | 5 October |
| Silver | Akeem Bloomfield; Nathon Allen; Terry Thomas; Demish Gaye; Javon Francis* | Men's 4 × 400 m relay | 6 October |
| Bronze | Shericka Jackson | Women's 400 m | 3 October |
| Bronze | Rushell Clayton | Women's 400 m hurdles | 4 October |
| Bronze | Danielle Williams | Women's 100 m hurdles | 6 October |
| Bronze | Anastasia Le-Roy; Tiffany James; Stephenie Ann McPherson; Shericka Jackson; Roneisha McGregor* | Women's 4 × 400 m relay | 6 October |

* – Indicates the athlete competed in preliminaries but not the final

== Results ==
Key

- Q = Qualified for the next round
- q = Qualified for the next round as a fastest loser or, in field events, by position without achieving the qualifying target
- NR = National record
- PB = Personal best
- SB = Season best
- N/A = Round not applicable for the event

=== Men ===
Track and road events

| Athlete | Event | Heat | | Semifinal | | Final | |
| Athlete | Event | Result | Rank | Result | Rank | Result | Rank |
|---|---|---|---|---|---|---|---|
| Yohan Blake | 100 metres | 10.07 | 4 Q | 10.09 | 5 Q | 9.97 | 5 |
| Tyquendo Tracey | 100 metres | 10.21 | 23 q | 10.11 | 8 | Did not advance | |
| Yohan Blake | 200 metres | 20.23 SB | 8 Q | 20.37 | 15 | Did not advance | |
| Rasheed Dwyer | 200 metres | 20.37 | 15 Q | 20.54 | 16 | Did not advance | |
| Andre Ewers | 200 metres | 20.41 | 21 q | 20.61 | 19 | Did not advance | |
| Demish Gaye | 400 metres | 45.02 | 3 Q | 44.66 SB | 7 q | 44.46 PB | 4 |
| Akeem Bloomfield | 400 metres | 45.34 | 11 Q | 44.77 | 8 q | 45.36 | 8 |
| Rusheen McDonald | 400 metres | 46.21 | 29 | Did not advance | | | |
| Orlando Bennett | 110 metres hurdles | 13.50 | 16 q | 13.60 | 19 | Did not advance | |
| Ronald Levy | 110 metres hurdles | 13.48 | 14 Q | DQ | – | Did not advance | |
| Omar McLeod | 110 metres hurdles | 13.17 | 2 Q | 13.08 | 1 Q | DQ | – |
| Andrew Riley | 110 metres hurdles | 13.67 | 25 Q | 13.57 | 16 | Did not advance | |
| Kemar Mowatt | 400 metres hurdles | 49.63 | 12 Q | 49.32 | 16 | Did not advance | |
| Oshane Bailey; Yohan Blake; Rasheed Dwyer; Tyquendo Tracey | 4 × 100 metres relay | 38.15 SB | 11 | — | | Did not advance | |
| Akeem Bloomfield; Nathon Allen; Terry Thomas; Demish Gaye; Javon Francis* | 4 × 400 metres relay | 3:00.76 SB | 2 Q | — | | 2:57.90 SB | 2nd place, silver medalist(s) |

* – Indicates the athlete competed in preliminaries but not the final

Field events

| Athlete | Event | Qualification | | Final | |
| Athlete | Event | Distance | Position | Distance | Position |
|---|---|---|---|---|---|
| Tajay Gayle | Long jump | 7.89 | 12 q | 8.69 WL | 1st place, gold medalist(s) |
| Jordan Scott | Triple jump | 14.73 | 33 | Did not advance | |
| O'Dayne Richards | Shot put | 20.07 | 22 | Did not advance | |
| Fedrick Dacres | Discus throw | 65.44 | 2 q | 66.94 | 2nd place, silver medalist(s) |
| Travis Smikle | Discus throw | 62.93 | 15 | Did not advance | |
| Chad Wright | Discus throw | 60.60 | 26 | Did not advance | |

=== Women ===
Track and road events

| Athlete | Event | Heat | | Semifinal | | Final | |
| Athlete | Event | Result | Rank | Result | Rank | Result | Rank |
|---|---|---|---|---|---|---|---|
| Shelly-Ann Fraser-Pryce | 100 metres | 10.80 | 1 Q | 10.81 | 1 Q | 10.71 WL | 1st place, gold medalist(s) |
| Jonielle Smith | 100 metres | 11.20 | 12 Q | 11.06 | 6 Q | 11.06 | 6 |
| Elaine Thompson | 100 metres | 11.14 | 6 Q | 11.00 | 4 Q | 10.93 | 4 |
| Schillonie Calvert | 200 metres | 23.52 | 35 | Did not advance | | | |
| Elaine Thompson | 200 metres | 22.61 | 7 Q | DNS | – | Did not advance | |
| Sashalee Forbes | 200 metres | 23.15 | 24 Q | 23.14 | 20 | Did not advance | |
| Shericka Jackson | 400 metres | 51.13 | 5 Q | 50.10 | 4 q | 49.47 PB | 3rd place, bronze medalist(s) |
| Anastasia Le-Roy | 400 metres | 52.26 | 35 | Did not advance | | | |
| Stephenie Ann McPherson | 400 metres | 51.21 | 8 Q | 50.70 SB | 6 Q | 50.89 | 6 |
| Natoya Goule | 800 metres | 2:01.01 | 2 Q | 2:00.33 | 7 q | 2:00.11 | 6 |
| Aisha Praught-Leer | 1500 metres | 4:09.81 | 29 | Did not advance | | | |
| Janeek Brown | 100 metres hurdles | 12.61 | 5 Q | 12.62 | 7 Q | 12.88 | 7 |
| Danielle Williams | 100 metres hurdles | 12.51 | 2 Q | 12.41 | 1 Q | 12.47 | 3rd place, bronze medalist(s) |
| Megan Tapper | 100 metres hurdles | 12.78 | 10 Q | 12.61 PB | 5 Q | DNF | – |
| Yanique Thompson | 100 metres hurdles | 12.85 | 13 Q | 12.80 SB | 10 | Did not advance | |
| Rushell Clayton | 400 metres hurdles | 55.23 | 9 Q | 54.17 | 3 Q | 53.74 PB | 3rd place, bronze medalist(s) |
| Shiann Salmon | 400 metres hurdles | 55.20 PB | 8 Q | 55.16 PB | 11 | Did not advance | |
| Ronda Whyte | 400 metres hurdles | 56.37 | 24 | Did not advance | | | |
| Natalliah Whyte; Shelly-Ann Fraser-Pryce; Jonielle Smith; Shericka Jackson; Natasha Morrison* | 4 × 100 metres relay | 42.11 SB | 1 Q | — | | 41.44 WL | 1st place, gold medalist(s) |
| Anastasia Le-Roy; Tiffany James; Stephenie Ann McPherson; Shericka Jackson; Roneisha McGregor* | 4 × 400 metres relay | 3:23.64 WL | 2 Q | — | | 3:22.37 SB | 3rd place, bronze medalist(s) |

* – Indicates the athlete competed in preliminaries but not the final

Field events

| Athlete | Event | Qualification | | Final | |
| Athlete | Event | Distance | Position | Distance | Position |
|---|---|---|---|---|---|
| Tissanna Hickling | Long jump | 6.49 | 16 | Did not advance | |
| Chanice Porter | Long jump | 6.57 | 10 q | 6.56 | 8 |
| Shanieka Ricketts | Triple jump | 14.42 | 1 Q | 14.92 | 2nd place, silver medalist(s) |
| Kimberly Williams | Triple jump | 14.20 | 11 q | 14.64 PB | 4 |
| Danniel Thomas-Dodd | Shot put | 19.32 | 1 Q | 19.47 | 2nd place, silver medalist(s) |
| Shadae Lawrence | Discus throw | 58.51 | 19 | Did not advance | |
| Shanice Love | Discus throw | 59.50 | 16 | Did not advance | |

=== Mixed ===
| Athlete | Event | Heat | | Final | |
| Athlete | Event | Result | Rank | Result | Rank |
|---|---|---|---|---|---|
| Nathon Allen; Roneisha McGregor; Tiffany James; Javon Francis; Janieve Russell* | 4 × 400 m relay | 3:12.73 NR | 2 Q | 3:11.78 NR | 2nd place, silver medalist(s) |

* – Indicates the athlete competed in preliminaries but not the final
