= Finland at the 2019 World Athletics Championships =

Finland at the 2019 World Championships in Athletics
- WA code: FIN
- National federation: Finnish Amateur Athletic Association
- Website: www.yleisurheilu.fi

in Doha, Qatar 27 September 2019 – 6 October 2019
- Competitors: 22 (8 men and 14 women) in 17 events
- Medals: Gold 0 Silver 0 Bronze 0 Total 0

World Championships in Athletics appearances
- 1976; 1980; 1983; 1987; 1991; 1993; 1995; 1997; 1999; 2001; 2003; 2005; 2007; 2009; 2011; 2013; 2015; 2017; 2019; 2022; 2023; 2025

Finland competed at the 2019 World Championships in Athletics in Doha, Qatar, from 27 September to 6 October 2019.

== Athlete selections ==
The Finnish Amateur Athletic Association named the first 4 athletes of the team on 25 March 2019. The list was extended with 7 further athletes on 1 July 2019. Taika Koilahti and Wilma Murto were added to the team based on their ranking on 10 September 2019 bringing the total number of athletes to 19.

== Results ==
=== Men ===
Track and road events

Athlete	Event	Heat		Semifinal		Final	
Athlete	Event	Result	Rank	Result	Rank	Result	Rank
Elmo Lakka	110 metres hurdles	13.73	28	Did not advance			
Topi Raitanen	3000 metres steeplechase	8:32.44	29	—N/a		Did not advance	
Jarkko Kinnunen	50 kilometres walk	—N/a				4:25:36	20
Aku Partanen	50 kilometres walk	—N/a				Did not finish	

Field events

Athlete	Event	Qualification		Final	
Athlete	Event	Result	Rank	Result	Rank
Simo Lipsanen	Triple jump	16.47	23	Did not advance	
Lassi Etelätalo	Javelin throw	82.26	12 q	82.49	4
Oliver Helander	Javelin throw	80.36	19	Did not advance	
Antti Ruuskanen	Javelin throw	75.05	28	Did not advance	

=== Women ===
Track and road events

Athlete	Event	Heat		Semifinal		Final	
Athlete	Event	Result	Rank	Result	Rank	Result	Rank
Reetta Hurske	100 metres hurdles	12.96	16 Q	13.24	21	Did not advance	
Annimari Korte	100 metres hurdles	12.97	18 Q	12.97	17	Did not advance	
Nooralotta Neziri	100 metres hurdles	12.92	15 q	12.89 SB	14	Did not advance	
Anne-Mari Hyryläinen	Marathon	—N/a				2:51:26	19
Alisa Vainio	Marathon	—N/a				2:56:30 SB	26
Tiia Kuikka	50 kilometres walk	—N/a				Did not start	
Sara Kuivisto	800 metres	2:03.15	20	Did not advance			
Sara Kuivisto	1500 metres	4:08.85 PB	25	Did not advance			
Camilla Richardsson	3000 metres steeplechase	9:53.06	38	—N/a		Did not advance	

Field events

Athlete	Event	Qualification		Final	
Athlete	Event	Result	Rank	Result	Rank
Ella Junnila	High jump	1.80	28	Did not advance	
Wilma Murto	Pole vault	4.35	22	Did not advance	
Taika Koilahti	Long jump	6.35	27	Did not advance	
Kristiina Mäkelä	Triple jump	14.26	6 q	13.99	12
Krista Tervo	Hammer throw	68.25	21	Did not advance	

Combined events – Heptathlon

Athlete	Event	100H	HJ	SP	200 m	LJ	JT	800 m	Total	Rank
Maria Huntington	Result	13.32	1.83	12.21	24.72	Did not start			Did not finish	
Maria Huntington	Points	1077	1016	675	913	Did not start			Did not finish	
