= Netherlands at the 2019 World Athletics Championships =

Netherlands at the 2019 World Championships in Athletics
- WA code: NED
- Website: www.atletiekunie.nl

in Doha, Qatar 27 September 2019 – 6 October 2019
- Competitors: 30 (11 men and 19 women) in 21 events
- Medals Ranked = 9th: Gold 2 Silver 0 Bronze 0 Total 2

World Championships in Athletics appearances
- 1976; 1980; 1983; 1987; 1991; 1993; 1995; 1997; 1999; 2001; 2003; 2005; 2007; 2009; 2011; 2013; 2015; 2017; 2019; 2022; 2023; 2025

Netherlands competed at the 2019 World Athletics Championships in Doha, Qatar, from 27 October to 6 October 2019. 30 athletes were selected to compete for the Netherlands.

== Medalists ==
| Medal | Name | Event | Date |
|---|---|---|---|
| Gold | Sifan Hassan | Women's 10,000 metres | 28 September |
| Gold | Sifan Hassan | Women's 1500 metres | 5 October |

== Results ==
=== Men ===
Track and road events

| Athlete | Event | Heat | | Semifinal | | Final | |
| Athlete | Event | Result | Rank | Result | Rank | Result | Rank |
|---|---|---|---|---|---|---|---|
| Taymir Burnet | 100 metres | 10.21 | 20 | Did not advance | | | |
| Taymir Burnet | 200 metres | 20.37 | 16 Q | 20.34 | 12 | Did not advance | |
| Nick Smidt | 400 metres hurdles | 50.54 | 26 | Did not advance | | | |
| Joris van Gool; Taymir Burnet; Hensley Paulina; Churandy Martina | 4 × 100 metres relay | 37.91 | 7 q | —N/a | | DSQ | |

Field events

| Athlete | Event | Qualification | | Final | |
| Athlete | Event | Distance | Position | Distance | Position |
|---|---|---|---|---|---|
| Douwe Amels | High jump | 2.22 | 19 | Did not advance | |
| Rutger Koppelaar | Pole vault | 5.45 | 23 | Did not advance | |
| Menno Vloon | Pole vault | Did not start | | Did not advance | |
| Denzel Comenentia | Shot put | 20.03 | 23 | Did not advance | |

Combined events – Decathlon

| Athlete | Event | 100 m | LJ | SP | HJ | 400 m | 110H | DT | PV | JT | 1500 m | Final | Rank |
|---|---|---|---|---|---|---|---|---|---|---|---|---|---|
| Pieter Braun | Result | 11.16 | 7.47 | 15.26 | 2.02 | 48.79 | 14.59 | 45.59 | 4.80 | 59.84 | 4:35.62 | 8222 | 7 |
| Pieter Braun | Points | 825 | 927 | 806 | 822 | 871 | 900 | 779 | 849 | 735 | 708 | 8222 | 7 |

=== Women ===
Track and road events

| Athlete | Event | Heat | | Semifinal | | Final | |
| Athlete | Event | Result | Rank | Result | Rank | Result | Rank |
|---|---|---|---|---|---|---|---|
| Dafne Schippers | 100 metres | 11.17 | 8 Q | 11.07 | 7 q | DNS | – |
| Marije van Hunenstijn | 100 metres | 11.48 | 35 | Did not advance | | | |
| Dafne Schippers | 200 metres | DNS | – | Did not advance | | | |
| Jamile Samuel | 200 metres | 22.90 | 17 | 23.02 | 15 | Did not advance | |
| Lisanne de Witte | 400 metres | 51.31 | 10 q | 51.41 | 11 | Did not advance | |
| Sifan Hassan | 1500 metres | 4:03.88 | 1 Q | 4:14.69 | 12 Q | 3:51.95 | 1st place, gold medalist(s) |
| Maureen Koster | 5000 metres | DNF | | —N/a | | Did not advance | |
| Sifan Hassan | 10,000 metres | —N/a | | | | 30:17.62 | 1st place, gold medalist(s) |
| Nadine Visser | 100 metres hurdles | 12.75 | 7 Q | 12.62 | 6 q | 12.66 | 6 |
| Femke Bol | 400 metres hurdles | 55.32 | 11 q | 56.37 | 22 | Did not advance | |
| Nargélis Statia Pieter; Marije van Hunenstijn; Jamile Samuel; Naomi Sedney | 4 × 100 metres relay | 43.01 | 9 | —N/a | | Did not advance | |
| Lieke Klaver; Lisanne de Witte; Bianca Baak; Femke Bol | 4 × 400 metres relay | 3:27.40 | 8 | —N/a | | 3:27.89 | 7 |

Field events

| Athlete | Event | Qualification | | Final | |
| Athlete | Event | Result | Rank | Result | Rank |
|---|---|---|---|---|---|
| Jorinde van Klinken | Discus throw | 58.58 | 18 | Did not advance | |
| Killiana Heymans | Pole vault | 4.20 | 31 | Did not advance | |

Combined events – Heptathlon

| Athlete | Event | 100H | HJ | SP | 200 m | LJ | JT | 800 m | Final | Rank |
|---|---|---|---|---|---|---|---|---|---|---|
| Anouk Vetter | Result | 13.55 | 1.74 | 14.10 | 24.43 | 6.20 | 54.17 | DNS | DNF | |
| Anouk Vetter | Points | 1043 | 903 | 801 | 940 | 912 | 941 | DNS | DNF | |
| Nadine Broersen | Result | 13.61 | 1.83 | 14.75 | 25.28 | 6.22 | 50.41 | 2:18.01 | 6392 | 6 |
| Nadine Broersen | Points | 1034 | 1016 | 844 | 861 | 918 | 868 | 851 | 6392 | 6 |
| Emma Oosterwegel | Result | 13.65 | 1.77 | 13.70 | 25.10 | 5.87 | 54.01 | 2:15.86 | 6250 | 7 |
| Emma Oosterwegel | Points | 1084 | 978 | 833 | 945 | 834 | 579 | 814 | 6250 | 7 |
