= 2019 World Athletics Championships – Men's 110 metres hurdles =

Men's 110 metres hurdles at the 2019 World Championships
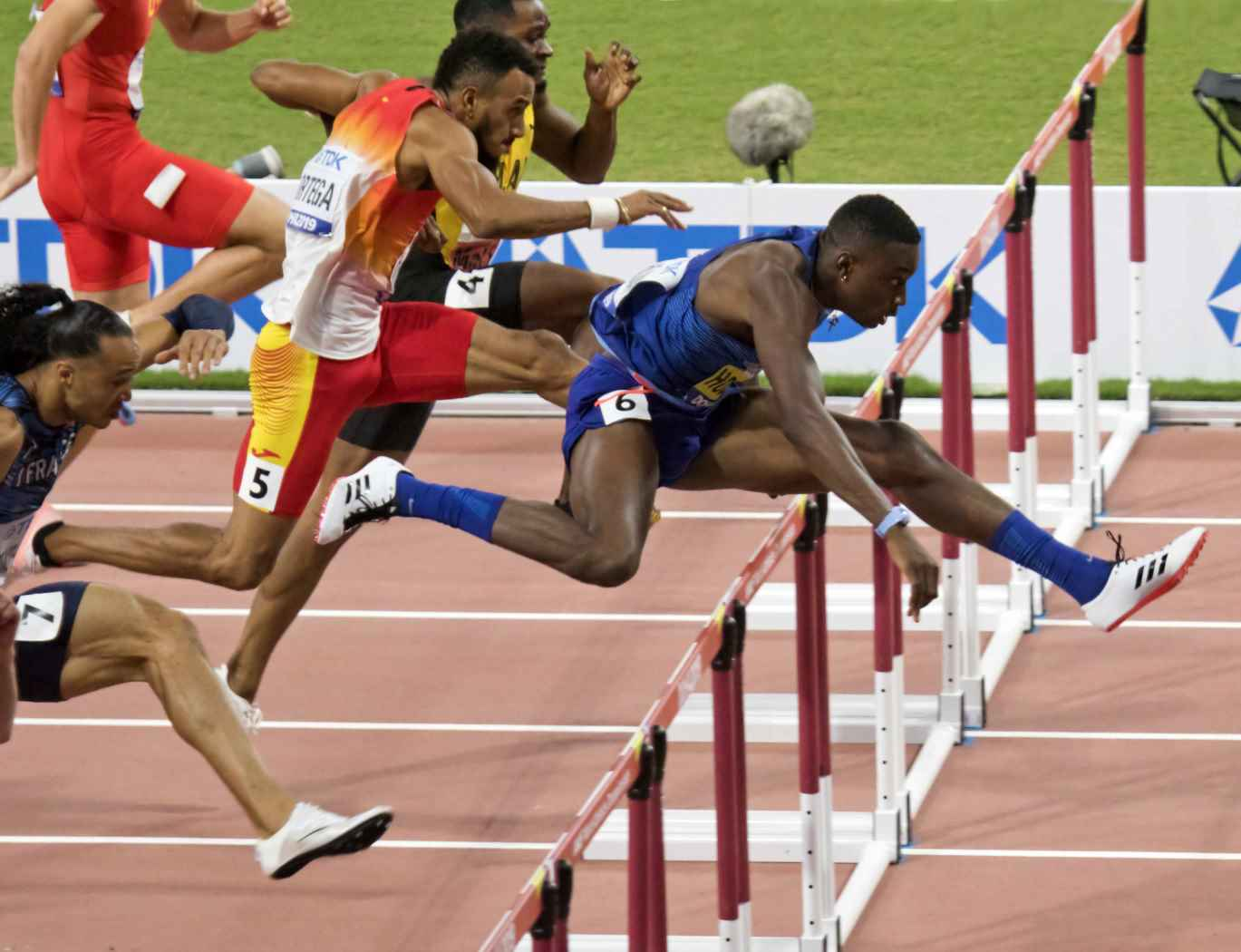
- The final underway.
- Venue: Khalifa International Stadium
- Dates: 30 September (heats); 2 October (semi-finals & final)
- Competitors: 39 from 27 nations
- Winning time: 13.10

Medalists
gold medal	Grant Holloway; United States
silver medal	Sergey Shubenkov; Authorised Neutral Athletes
bronze medal	Pascal Martinot-Lagarde; France
bronze medal	Orlando Ortega; Spain

The men's 110 metres hurdles at the 2019 World Athletics Championships was held at the Khalifa International Stadium in Doha from 30 September to 2 October.

== Summary ==
Five athletes returned from the 2017 final, the defending champion and Olympic champion Omar McLeod, silver medalist Sergey Shubenkov, Olympic silver medalist Orlando Ortega, Devon Allen and Shane Brathwaite, added as a 9th finalist after he was interfered with in the semi-finals when Ronald Levy drifted out of his lane.

In the final, McLeod and American collegian Grant Holloway got out even, but by the second hurdle, Holloway was edging ahead with Ortega the next behind. Holloway was gaining a little on every hurdle, and by the fourth, Pascal Martinot-Lagarde was even with Ortega. As Holloway's lead extended, McLeod pressed. McLeod rattled the eighth hurdle. Ortega again was slightly ahead of Martinot-Lagarde, but Shubenkov was also there moving fast on the outside. McLeod hit the 9th with his foot flat, losing his balance while running at full speed. He popped up trying to get over the final barrier, bumping Ortega to his right as he failed, crashing to the track. Holloway won by a metre with Shubenkov beating Martinot-Lagarde to the line. After the bump, Ortega managed to stay upright, crossing the line in fifth, his arms outstretched as if asking what could be done after he was interfered with.

Holloway continued celebrating all the way through the first turn and half way down the backstretch before dramatically flopping to the track on his back. McLeod was disqualified for interference. After the race, Spain filed a protest and Ortega was awarded a second bronze medal.

== Records ==
Before the competition records were as follows:

World record	Aries Merritt (USA)	12.80	Brussels, Belgium	7 September 2012
Championship record	Colin Jackson (GBR)	12.91	Stuttgart, Germany	20 August 1993
World Leading	Grant Holloway (USA)	12.98	Austin, United States	7 June 2019
African Record	Antonio Alkana (RSA)	13.11	Prague, Czech Republic	5 June 2017
Asian Record	Liu Xiang (CHN)	12.88	Lausanne, Switzerland	11 July 2006
North, Central American and Caribbean record	Aries Merritt (USA)	12.80	Brussels, Belgium	7 September 2012
South American Record	Gabriel Constantino (BRA)	13.18	Székesfehérvár, Hungary	9 July 2019
European Record	Colin Jackson (GBR)	12.91	Stuttgart, Germany	20 August 1993
Oceanian record	Kyle Vander-Kuyp (AUS)	13.29	Gothenburg, Sweden	11 August 1995

The following records were set at the competition:

Record	Perf.	Athlete	Nat.	Date
Swiss	13.39	Jason Joseph	SUI	30 Sep 2019

== Qualification standard ==
The standard to qualify automatically for entry was 13.46.

== Schedule ==
The event schedule, in local time (UTC+3), was as follows:

Date	Time	Round
30 September	20:05	Heats
2 October	20:05	Semi-finals
2 October	23:00	Final

== Results ==
=== Heats ===
The first four in each heat (Q) and the next four fastest (q) qualified for the semi-finals.

Rank	Heat	Lane	Name	Nationality	Time	Notes
1	5	9	Orlando Ortega	Spain	13.15	Q
2	1	9	Omar McLeod	Jamaica	13.17	Q
3	4	8	Grant Holloway	United States	13.22	Q
4	2	6	Sergey Shubenkov	Authorised Neutral Athletes	13.27	Q
5	4	7	Shunya Takayama	Japan	13.32	Q
6	1	3	Milan Trajkovic	Cyprus	13.37	Q, SB
7	2	8	Xie Wenjun	China	13.38	Q
8	2	5	Jason Joseph	Switzerland	13.39	Q, NR
9	1	6	Antonio Alkana	South Africa	13.41	Q
10	4	4	Konstadinos Douvalidis	Greece	13.43	Q, SB
11	4	6	Yaqoub Al-Youha	Kuwait	13.43	Q
12	3	5	Pascal Martinot-Lagarde	France	13.45	Q
13	1	7	Devon Allen	United States	13.46	Q
14	5	7	Ronald Levy	Jamaica	13.48	Q
15	1	2	Hassane Fofana	Italy	13.49	q
16	4	5	Orlando Bennett	Jamaica	13.50	q
17	2	3	Shane Brathwaite	Barbados	13.51	Q
18	3	9	Andrew Pozzi	Great Britain & N.I.	13.53	Q
19	4	2	Dimitri Bascou	France	13.53	q
20	5	6	Chen Kuei-ru	Chinese Taipei	13.57	Q
21	1	5	Nicholas Hough	Australia	13.60	q
22	2	4	Valdó Szűcs	Hungary	13.60	
23	1	8	Vitali Parakhonka	Belarus	13.65	
24	5	8	Wilhem Belocian	France	13.67	Q
25	3	2	Andrew Riley	Jamaica	13.67	Q
26	5	4	Zeng Jianhang	China	13.68	
27	5	5	Lorenzo Perini	Italy	13.70	
28	2	9	Elmo Lakka	Finland	13.73	
29	2	7	Taio Kanai	Japan	13.74	
30	5	2	Louis François Mendy	Senegal	13.75	
31	3	8	Yohan Chaverra	Colombia	13.76	Q
32	2	2	Eduardo Rodrigues	Brazil	13.92	
33	3	3	Ruan de Vries	South Africa	14.07	
34	5	3	Roger Iribarne	Cuba	14.37	
35	4	9	Anousone Xaysa	Laos	14.54	
36	4	1	Fadane Hamadi	Comoros	14.79	
	3	7	Jeffrey Julmis	Haiti	DQ	162.8
	3	4	Daniel Roberts	United States	DQ	168.6
	1	4	Gabriel Constantino	Brazil	DQ	168.7(b)
	4	3	Damian Czykier	Poland	DNS	
	3	6	Shunsuke Izumiya	Japan	DNS	

=== Semi-finals ===
The first two in each heat (Q) and the next two fastest (q) qualify for the final.

Rank	Heat	Lane	Name	Nationality	Time	Notes
1	2	5	Omar McLeod	Jamaica	13.08	Q
2	1	5	Grant Holloway	United States	13.10	Q
3	2	6	Pascal Martinot-Lagarde	France	13.12	Q, SB
4	3	4	Orlando Ortega	Spain	13.16	Q
5	1	6	Sergey Shubenkov	Authorised Neutral Athletes	13.18	Q
6	2	7	Xie Wenjun	China	13.22	q
7	3	7	Milan Trajkovic	Cyprus	13.29	Q, SB
8	2	9	Devon Allen	United States	13.36	q
9	3	5	Antonio Alkana	South Africa	13.47	
10	1	2	Dimitri Bascou	France	13.48	
11	2	8	Chen Kuei-ru	Chinese Taipei	13.52	
12	2	2	Hassane Fofana	Italy	13.52	
13	2	4	Jason Joseph	Switzerland	13.53	
14	3	9	Konstadinos Douvalidis	Greece	13.54	
15	1	9	Yaqoub Al-Youha	Kuwait	13.57	
16	3	8	Andrew Riley	Jamaica	13.57	
17	3	6	Shunya Takayama	Japan	13.58	
18	1	4	Andrew Pozzi	Great Britain & N.I.	13.60	
19	1	3	Orlando Bennett	Jamaica	13.60	
19	3	3	Wilhem Belocian	France	13.60	
21	3	2	Nicholas Hough	Australia	13.61	
22	2	3	Yohan Chaverra	Colombia	13.76	
23	1	8	Shane Brathwaite	Barbados	14.29	qJ
	1	7	Ronald Levy	Jamaica	DQ	168.6

=== Final ===
The final was started on 2 October at 23:00.

Rank	Lane	Name	Nationality	Time	Notes
1st place, gold medalist(s)	6	Grant Holloway	United States	13.10	
2nd place, silver medalist(s)	9	Sergey Shubenkov	Authorised Neutral Athletes	13.15	
3rd place, bronze medalist(s)	7	Pascal Martinot-Lagarde	France	13.18	
3rd place, bronze medalist(s)	5	Orlando Ortega	Spain	13.30	Awarded after an appeal
5	2	Xie Wenjun	China	13.29	
6	1	Shane Brathwaite	Barbados	13.61	
7	3	Devon Allen	United States	13.70	
8	8	Milan Trajkovic	Cyprus	13.87	
	4	Omar McLeod	Jamaica	DQ	163.2(b)
