= Orlando Ortega =

Spanish hurdler

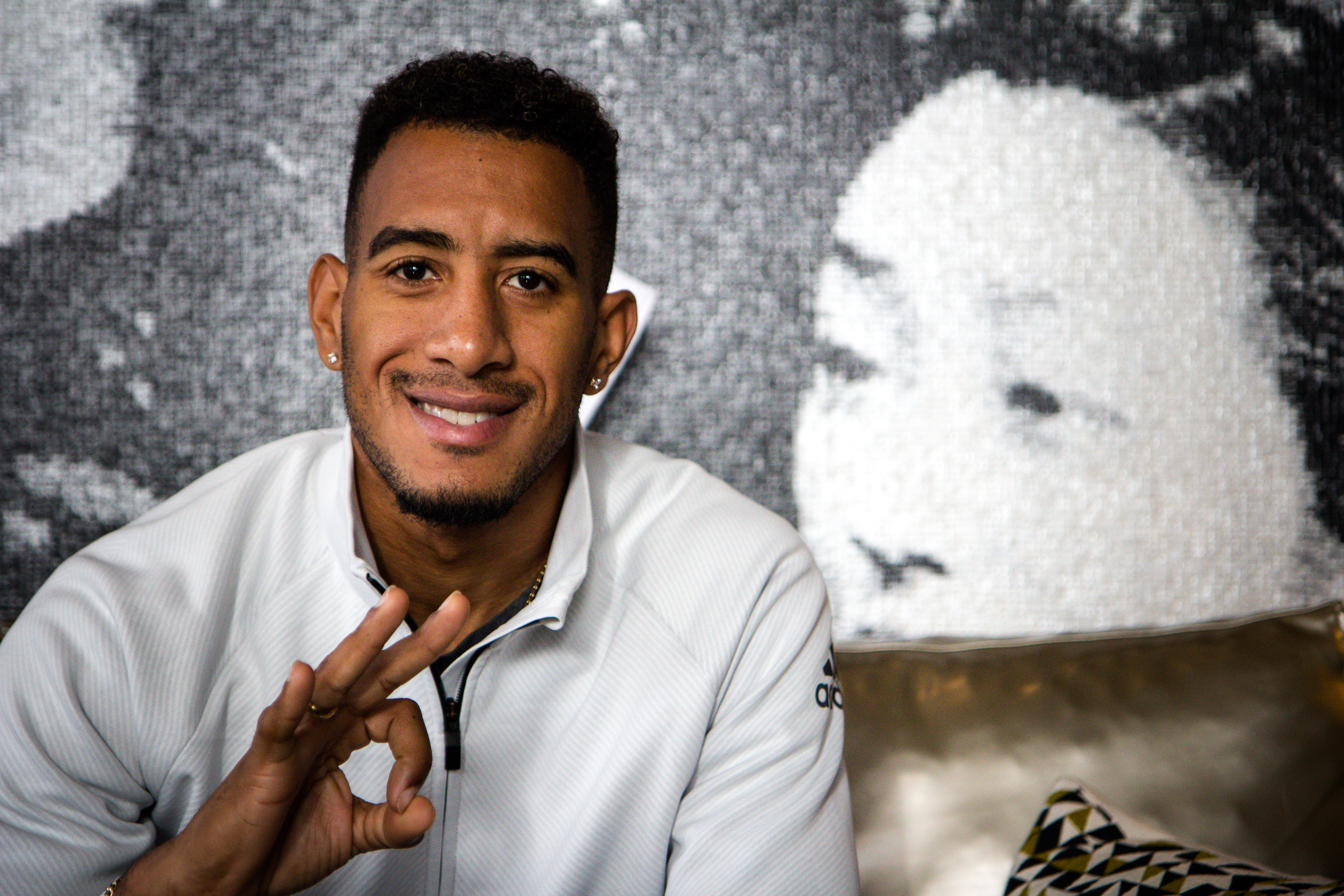
- Ortega in 2019

Personal information
- Full name: Orlando Ortega Alejo
- Nationality: Spanish
- Born: 29 July 1991 (age 35) Artemisa, Cuba
- Height: 1.85 m (6 ft 1 in)
- Weight: 70 kg (154 lb)

Sport
- Country: Spain
- Sport: Athletics
- Event: 110 metre hurdles

Achievements and titles
- Personal bests: 110 m hurdles: 12.94 s (+0.5 m/s) (Paris Saint-Denis 2015); 60 m hurdles: 7.45 s (Lódz 2015)
Medal record
Men's athletics
Representing Spain
Olympic Games
Silver medal – second place	2016 Rio de Janeiro	110 m hurdles
World Championships
Bronze medal – third place	2019 Doha	110 m hurdles
European Championships
Bronze medal – third place	2018 Berlin	110 m hurdles
Representing Cuba
Pan American Games
Bronze medal – third place	2011 Guadalajara	110 m hurdles

Orlando Ortega Alejo (born 29 July 1991) is a Cuban-born Spanish track and field athlete who competes in the 110 metres hurdles. His personal best for the event is 12.94 seconds and he was the silver medallist at the 2016 Olympics.

== Career ==
Ortega gradually rose through Cuba's ranks from 2007 onwards, taking youth and junior national titles in the hurdles. Ortega's grandmother and his first coach was Cristina Hechavarria, a 4 × 100 meter relay gold medalist at the Athletics at the 1967 Pan American Games. She died when Ortega was young, and in memory of her kept all his medals at her house. He was chosen to compete at the 2010 World Junior Championships in Athletics, but did not finish his heat. In his first year of senior competition in 2011, he established himself nationally with a win at the Barrientos Memorial meeting, winning with a personal best of 13.56 seconds. He improved further at a meeting in Havana running a time of 13.29 seconds. He was one hundredth of a second off his best in the final at the 2011 Pan American Games and claimed the bronze medal while fellow Cuban Dayron Robles took the title.

He competed on the European indoor circuit in early 2012; the highlight of the season was a second-place finish at the XL Galan and a 60 metres hurdles best of 7.57 seconds in Metz. He narrowly missed out on making the final at the 2012 IAAF World Indoor Championships, coming fifth in his heat. He began training under hurdles coach Santiago Antúnez, alongside Dayron Robles, and defeated his partner for the first time in Havana in May, improving his 110 m hurdles time to 13.09 seconds to become the third fastest Cuban ever in the event. He came third at the Adidas Grand Prix in New York in June. He came in sixth in the final 110m hurdles at the 2012 Summer Olympics.

He was studying a degree in physical education in Cuba.

During the 2013 World Championships in Moscow, he defected from Cuba and has competed for Spain since September 2013. International Association of Athletics Federations (IAAF) ruled he was not allowed to represent Spain officially until November 2016 — three full years after he officially became a Spanish resident – so he originally wasn't able to take part at the 2016 Summer Olympics. Eventually he was allowed to compete in the 2016 Summer Olympics and took home a silver medal in the 110m hurdles behind Omar McLeod.

Ortega won the bronze medal at the 2018 European Championships.

At the 2019 World Championships, Ortega qualified for the final, but finished 5th after Omar McLeod stumbled into him and arrested his momentum. Ortega was in second place until the incident. After an appeal by the Spanish Federation, the IAAF awarded him with a bronze medal.

== Competition record ==
Year	Competition	Venue	Position	Event	Notes
Representing Cuba
2011	Pan American Games	Guadalajara, Mexico	3rd	110 m hurdles	13.30
2012	Olympic Games	London, United Kingdom	6th	110 m hurdles	13.26 (s)
2012	World Indoor Championships	Istanbul, Turkey	9th (s)	60 m hurdles	7.71
2013	World Championships	Moscow, Russia	25th (h)	110 m hurdles	13.69
Representing Spain
2016	Olympic Games	Rio de Janeiro, Brazil	2nd	110 m hurdles	13.17
2017	European Indoor Championships	Belgrade, Serbia	7th	60 m hurdles	7.64
2017	World Championships	London, United Kingdom	7th	110 m hurdles	13.37
2018	European Championships	Berlin, Germany	3rd	110 m hurdles	13.34
2019	European Indoor Championships	Glasgow, United Kingdom	4th	60 m hurdles	7.64
2019	World Championships	Doha, Qatar	3rd	110 m hurdles	13.30
2024	European Championships	Rome, Italy	13th (sf)	110 m hurdles	13.64

=== Track records ===
As of 14 September 2024, Ortega holds the following track records for 110 metres hurdles.

Location	Time	Windspeed m/s	Date
Baie-Mahault	13.17	+ 0.3	08/05/2013
Gijón	13.09	+ 1.0	24/07/2016
Huelva	13.38	– 1.9	14/06/2017
La Nucia	13.33	– 0.1	01/09/2019
Marseille	13.15	– 0.3	03/09/2020
Minsk	13.21	+ 0.1	10/09/2019
Tomblaine	13.12	+ 1.1	27/06/2014
Warsaw	13.03	– 0.5	23/08/2014
