= Czech Republic at the 2019 World Athletics Championships =

- WA code: CZE

in Doha
- Competitors: 23 (9 men and 14 women)
- Medals: Gold 0 Silver 0 Bronze 0 Total 0

World Athletics Championships appearances
- 1993; 1995; 1997; 1999; 2001; 2003; 2005; 2007; 2009; 2011; 2013; 2015; 2017; 2019; 2022; 2023; 2025

Czech Republic competed at the 2019 World Athletics Championships in Doha, Qatar, from 27 September–6 October 2019.

== Result ==
For the first time in its independent history, the Czech Republic failed to win any medals at the World Athletics Championships.

Key

- Note–Ranks given for track events are for the entire round
- Q = Qualified for the next round
- q = Qualified for the next round as a fastest loser or, in field events, by position without achieving the qualifying target
- NR = National record
- GR = Games record
- PB = Personal best
- SB = Season best
- DNF = Did not finish
- DNS = Did not start
- NM = No mark
- N/A = Round not applicable for the event
- Bye = Athlete not required to compete in round

=== Men ===
Track and road events

Athlete	Event	Heat		Semifinal		Final	
Athlete	Event	Result	Rank	Result	Rank	Result	Rank
Jakub Holuša	1500 m	3:39.79	32	Did not advance			
Filip Sasínek	1500 m	3:38.17	27	Did not advance			
Vít Müller	400 m hurdles	50.15	22 Q	49.97	19	Did not advance	
Jan Tesař; Michal Desenský; Patrik Šorm; Vít Müller	4 × 400 m relay	3:02.97 SB	11	—N/a		Did not advance	

Field events

Athlete	Event	Qualification		Final	
Athlete	Event	Distance	Position	Distance	Position
Tomáš Staněk	Shot put	21.02	8 Q	20.79	10
Jakub Vadlejch	Javelin throw	84.31	6 Q	82.19	5
Vítězslav Veselý	Javelin throw	DNS		Did not advance	

=== Women ===
Track and road events

Athlete	Event	Heat		Semifinal		Final	
Athlete	Event	Result	Rank	Result	Rank	Result	Rank
Lada Vondrová	400 m	52.23	32 Q	52.25	20	Did not advance	
Diana Mezuliáníková	800 m	2:03.48	30	Did not advance			
Kristiina Mäki	1500 m	4:06.61 PB	8 q	4:17.65	23	Did not advance	
Zuzana Hejnová	400 m hurdles	55.33	12 Q	54.41	5 Q	54.23	5
Marcela Joglová	Marathon	—N/a				2:52:22	20
Anežka Drahotová	20 km walk	—N/a				1:38:29	19

Field events

Athlete	Event	Qualification		Final	
Athlete	Event	Distance	Position	Distance	Position
Romana Maláčová	Pole vault	4.35	=22	Did not advance	
Eliška Staňková	Discus throw	58.98 SB	17	Did not advance	
Kateřina Šafránková	Hammer throw	65.46	29	Did not advance	
Nikola Ogrodníková	Javelin throw	61.17	9 q	57.24	11
Irena Šedivá	Javelin throw	60.90	12 q	55.86	12
Barbora Špotáková	Javelin throw	62.15	6 q	59.87	9

Combined events – Heptathlon

Athlete	Event	100H	HJ	SP	200 m	LJ	JT	800 m	Final	Rank
Kateřina Cachová	Result	13.47 SB	1.74 SB	12.58 SB	24.95	5.79	46.11	2:16.85	5987	16
Kateřina Cachová	Points	1055	903	700	891	786	785	867	5987	16

=== Mixed ===
Track and road events

Athlete	Event	Heat		Final	
Athlete	Event	Result	Rank	Result	Rank
Jan Tesař; Lada Vondrová; Tereza Petržilková; Patrik Šorm	4 × 400 m relay	3:18.01	15	Did not advance	
