= 2019 World Athletics Championships – Women's heptathlon =

Women's heptathlon at the 2019 World Championships
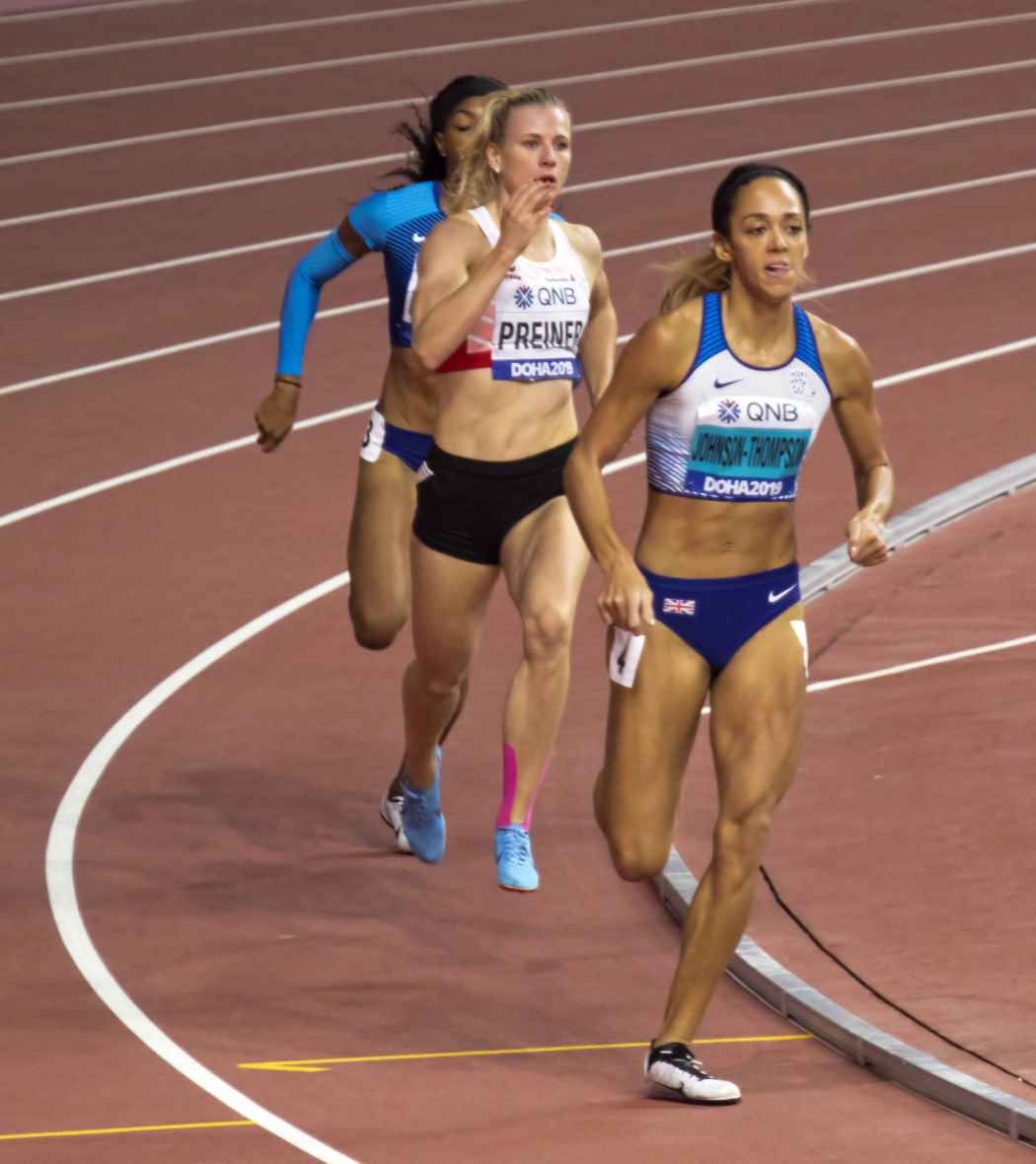
- Event winner Katarina Johnson-Thompson leads bronze medalist Verena Preiner in the 800 metres run
- Venue: Khalifa International Stadium
- Dates: 2–4 October
- Competitors: 20 from 12 nations
- Winning points: 6981

Medalists
gold medal	Katarina Johnson-Thompson	Great Britain
silver medal	Nafissatou Thiam	Belgium
bronze medal	Verena Preiner	Austria

Official video Video on YouTube Day 1 Video on YouTube Day 2

The women's heptathlon at the 2019 World Athletics Championships was held at the Khalifa International Stadium in Doha, Qatar, from 2 to 4 October 2019. The winning margin was 304 points.

== Records ==
Before the competition records were as follows:

Record	Perf.	Athlete	Nat.	Date	Location
World	7291	Jackie Joyner-Kersee	USA	24 Sep 1988	Seoul, South Kore
Championship	7128	Jackie Joyner-Kersee	USA	1 Sep 1987	Rome, Italy
World leading	6819	Nafissatou Thiam	BEL	23 Jun 2019	Talence, France
African	6423	Margaret Simpson	GHA	29 May 2005	Götzis, Austria
Asian	6942	Ghada Shouaa	SYR	26 May 1996	Götzis, Austria
NACAC	7291	Jackie Joyner-Kersee	USA	24 Sep 1988	Seoul, South Korea
South American	6285	Evelis Aguilar	COL	1 Aug 2018	Barranquilla, Colombia
European	7032	Carolina Klüft	SWE	26 Aug 2007	Osaka, Japan
Oceanian	6695	Jane Flemming	AUS	28 Jan 1990	Auckland, New Zealand

For the current records in each discipline see Women's heptathlon.

The following records were set at the competition:

Record	Discipline	Perf.	Athlete	Nat.	Date
World Leading		6981 pts	Katarina Johnson-Thompson	GBR	4 Oct 2019
Championship heptathlon best	100 metres hurdles	12.58sec	Kendell Williams	USA	2 Oct 2019
Championship heptathlon best	High jump	1.95m	Katarina Johnson-Thompson	GBR	2 Oct 2019
Championship heptathlon best	High jump	1.95m	Nafissatou Thiam	BEL	2 Oct 2019

== Schedule ==
The event schedule, in local time (UTC+3), is as follows:

Date	Time	Round
2 October	17:05	100 metres hurdles
2 October	18:15	High jump
2 October	20:30	Shot put
2 October	21:50	200 metres
3 October	18:15	Long jump
3 October	20:10	Javelin throw
4 October	00:05	800 metres

== Results ==
=== 100 metres hurdles ===
The 100 metres hurdles event was started on 2 October at 17:05.

Rank	Heat	Name	Nationality	Time	Points	Notes
1	3	Kendell Williams	United States	12.58	1189	CHB
2	3	Solène Ndama	France	12.90	1140	
3	3	Erica Bougard	United States	13.01	1123	
4	3	Marthe Koala	Burkina Faso	13.05	1117	NR
5	2	Katarina Johnson-Thompson	Great Britain & N.I.	13.09	1111	PB
6	3	Chari Hawkins	United States	13.23	1090	
7	2	Verena Preiner	Austria	13.25	1087	PB
8	2	Annie Kunz	United States	13.27	1084	PB
9	3	Maria Huntington	Finland	13.32	1077	
10	2	Nafissatou Thiam	Belgium	13.36	1071	SB
11	3	Odile Ahouanwanou	Benin	13.45	1058	
12	1	Kateřina Cachová	Czech Republic	13.47	1055	SB
13	1	Anouk Vetter	Netherlands	13.55	1043	SB
14	2	Noor Vidts	Belgium	13.58	1039	
15	2	Nadine Broersen	Netherlands	13.61	1034	
16	1	Emma Oosterwegel	Netherlands	13.65	1028	
17	1	Géraldine Ruckstuhl	Switzerland	13.84	1001	
18	1	Hanne Maudens	Belgium	13.90	993	PB
19	1	Ekaterina Voronina	Uzbekistan	14.64	890	
	2	Ivona Dadic	Austria	DQ	0	168.7(b)

=== High jump ===
The high jump event was started on 2 October at 18:15.

Rnk	Grp	Athlete	Nationality	1.56	1.59	1.62	1.65	1.68	1.71	1.74	1.77	1.80	1.83	1.86	1.89	1.92	1.95	1.98	Res	Pts	Nts	Overall	
Rnk	Grp	Athlete	Nationality	1.56	1.59	1.62	1.65	1.68	1.71	1.74	1.77	1.80	1.83	1.86	1.89	1.92	1.95	1.98	Res	Pts	Nts	Pts	Rnk
1	A	Katarina Johnson-Thompson	Great Britain & N.I.	–	–	–	–	–	–	–	–	–	o	xo	o	xo	o	xxx	1.95	1171	CHB	2282	1
2	A	Nafissatou Thiam	Belgium	–	–	–	–	–	–	–	–	–	xo	o	xo	o	xo	xxx	1.95	1171	CHB	2242	2
3	A	Erica Bougard	United States	–	–	–	–	–	–	o	xxo	xxo	o	xo	xxx				1.86	1054		2177	3
4	A	Maria Huntington	Finland	–	–	–	–	–	–	o	xo	xo	o	xxx					1.83	1016		2093	5
5	A	Nadine Broersen	Netherlands	–	–	–	–	–	o	o	o	o	xo	xxx					1.83	1016	SB	2050	7
6	B	Annie Kunz	United States	–	–	–	o	o	o	xo	xo	o	xxx						1.80	978	SB	2062	6
7	A	Ekaterina Voronina	Uzbekistan	–	–	–	–	o	o	o	xo	xxo	xxx						1.80	978		1868	17
8	B	Chari Hawkins	United States	–	–	–	–	–	o	o	o	xxx							1.77	941		2031	8
8	A	Noor Vidts	Belgium	–	–	–	–	o	o	o	o	xxx							1.77	941		1980	13
10	B	Verena Preiner	Austria	–	–	–	o	o	o	o	xo	xxx							1.77	941		2028	9
10	A	Kendell Williams	United States	–	–	–	–	–	o	o	xo	xxx							1.77	941		2130	4
12	B	Odile Ahouanwanou	Benin	–	–	–	o	o	o	xxo	xo	xxx							1.77	941	SB	1999	12
13	B	Emma Oosterwegel	Netherlands	–	–	–	o	o	o	xo	xxo	xxx							1.77	941	PB	1969	14
14	B	Marthe Koala	Burkina Faso	–	–	–	o	o	xo	o	xxx								1.74	903		2020	10
15	B	Kateřina Cachová	Czech Republic	–	o	o	xo	o	xo	xo	xxx								1.74	903	SB	1958	15
16	B	Anouk Vetter	Netherlands	–	–	–	o	o	xxo	xo	xxx								1.74	903		1946	16
17	A	Géraldine Ruckstuhl	Switzerland	–	–	–	xxo	o	o	xxx									1.71	867		1868	17
18	B	Solène Ndama	France	–	–	o	xo	xo	o	xxx									1.71	867		2007	11
19	B	Hanne Maudens	Belgium	–	–	–	o	o	xo	xxx									1.71	867		1860	19
	A	Ivona Dadic	Austria																DNS	0		DNF	

=== Shot put ===
The shot put event was started on 2 October at 20:30.

Rank	Group	Name	Nationality	Round			Result	Points	Notes	Overall	
Rank	Group	Name	Nationality	1	2	3	Result	Points	Notes	Pts	Rank
1	A	Nafissatou Thiam	Belgium	15.22	14.52	15.08	15.22	876		3118	1
2	A	Nadine Broersen	Netherlands	14.21	14.39	14.75	14.75	844		2894	4
3	A	Annie Kunz	United States	14.58	13.46	13.72	14.58	833	SB	2895	3
4	A	Géraldine Ruckstuhl	Switzerland	14.19	13.76	14.28	14.28	813		2681	16
5	A	Verena Preiner	Austria	14.21	13.69	13.73	14.21	808		2836	7
6	A	Odile Ahouanwanou	Benin	12.73	14.13	13.90	14.13	803		2802	8
7	A	Anouk Vetter	Netherlands	14.10	14.05	14.10	14.10	801		2747	13
8	B	Katarina Johnson-Thompson	Great Britain & N.I.	12.33	12.38	13.86	13.86	785	PB	3067	2
9	B	Emma Oosterwegel	Netherlands	13.70	13.53	12.79	13.70	774	PB	2743	15
10	A	Solène Ndama	France	x	13.57	13.68	13.68	773		2780	10
11	B	Ekaterina Voronina	Uzbekistan	12.81	13.61	13.66	13.66	771		2639	18
12	B	Chari Hawkins	United States	13.05	13.59	12.93	13.59	767	PB	2798	9
13	A	Noor Vidts	Belgium	12.83	13.55	12.46	13.55	764		2744	14
14	B	Marthe Koala	Burkina Faso	12.97	13.28	12.83	13.28	746	SB	2766	12
15	B	Hanne Maudens	Belgium	x	12.71	13.12	13.12	735		2595	19
16	B	Kendell Williams	United States	12.71	12.55	12.71	12.71	708		2838	6
17	B	Kateřina Cachová	Czech Republic	12.04	12.58	12.07	12.58	700	SB	2658	17
18	B	Erica Bougard	United States	12.36	12.17	12.33	12.36	685		2862	5
19	B	Maria Huntington	Finland	10.96	11.44	12.21	12.21	675		2768	11
	A	Ivona Dadic	Austria				DNS			DNF	

=== 200 metres ===
The 200 metres event was started on 2 October at 20:30.

Rank	Heat	Athlete	Nationality	Result	Points	Notes	Overall	
Rank	Heat	Athlete	Nationality	Result	Points	Notes	Pts	Rank
1	3	Katarina Johnson-Thompson	Great Britain & N.I.	23.08	1071	SB	4138	1
2	3	Kendell Williams	United States	23.62	1017	SB	3855	3
3	2	Hanne Maudens	Belgium	23.81	999	PB	3594	16
4	3	Erica Bougard	United States	23.89	991		3853	4
5	3	Verena Preiner	Austria	23.96	985	PB	3821	6
6	3	Odile Ahouanwanou	Benin	24.05	976		3778	7
7	3	Marthe Koala	Burkina Faso	24.29	953		3719	10
8	2	Solène Ndama	France	24.34	948		3728	9
9	2	Annie Kunz	United States	24.37	945		3840	5
10	2	Anouk Vetter	Netherlands	24.43	940		3687	12
11	2	Noor Vidts	Belgium	24.46	937		3681	13
12	1	Nafissatou Thiam	Belgium	24.60	924		4042	2
13	2	Maria Huntington	Finland	24.72	913		3681	13
14	2	Chari Hawkins	United States	24.81	904		3702	11
15	1	Kateřina Cachová	Czech Republic	24.95	891		3549	17
16	1	Ekaterina Voronina	Uzbekistan	25.03	884		3523	19
17	1	Emma Oosterwegel	Netherlands	25.10	878		3621	15
18	1	Géraldine Ruckstuhl	Switzerland	25.21	868		3549	17
19	1	Nadine Broersen	Netherlands	25.28	861		3755	8
	3	Ivona Dadic	Austria	DNS			DNF	

=== Long jump ===
The long jump event was started on 3 October at 18:15.

Rank	Group	Name	Nationality	Round			Result	Points	Notes	Overall	
Rank	Group	Name	Nationality	1	2	3	Result	Points	Notes	Pts	Rank
1	A	Katarina Johnson-Thompson	Great Britain & N.I.	6.32	6.77	x	6.77	1095		5233	1
2	A	Marthe Koala	Burkina Faso	6.44	x	6.30	6.44	988		4707	6
3	A	Hanne Maudens	Belgium	6.41	6.36	6.29	6.41	978		4572	11
4	A	Nafissatou Thiam	Belgium	6.25	6.35	6.40	6.40	975		5017	2
5	A	Verena Preiner	Austria	6.27	6.36	6.16	6.36	962	PB	4783	4
6	A	Kendell Williams	United States	x	x	6.28	6.28	937		4792	3
7	B	Nadine Broersen	Netherlands	6.22	6.10	x	6.22	918		4673	8
8	A	Erica Bougard	United States	6.21	6.19	5.95	6.21	915		4768	5
9	B	Anouk Vetter	Netherlands	6.08	6.12	6.20	6.20	912		4599	10
10	A	Noor Vidts	Belgium	6.11	5.82	6.09	6.11	883		4564	13
11	B	Odile Ahouanwanou	Benin	5.34	6.00	x	6.00	850	PB	4628	9
12	A	Solène Ndama	France	5.98	x	5.97	5.98	843		4571	12
13	B	Chari Hawkins	United States	5.95	5.88	x	5.95	834		4536	14
14	B	Annie Kunz	United States	5.75	x	5.95	5.95	834		4674	7
15	B	Emma Oosterwegel	Netherlands	5.75	5.65	5.87	5.87	810		4431	15
16	B	Ekaterina Voronina	Uzbekistan	x	5.83	5.82	5.83	798		4321	17
17	B	Kateřina Cachová	Czech Republic	5.79	5.68	5.52	5.79	786		4335	16
18	B	Géraldine Ruckstuhl	Switzerland	5.51	5.73	5.54	5.73	768		4317	18
	A	Maria Huntington	Finland				DNS			DNF	

=== Javelin throw ===
The javelin throw event was started on 3 October at 18:15.

Rank	Name	Nationality	Round			Result	Points	Notes	Overall	
Rank	Name	Nationality	1	2	3	Result	Points	Notes	Pts	Rank
1	Géraldine Ruckstuhl	Switzerland	52.50	53.20	55.35	55.35	964		5281	11
2	Anouk Vetter	Netherlands	51.87	54.17	x	54.17	941		5540	6
3	Emma Oosterwegel	Netherlands	54.01	52.51	51.96	54.01	938		5369	9
4	Ekaterina Voronina	Uzbekistan	48.81	51.60	51.53	51.60	891		5212	13
5	Nadine Broersen	Netherlands	49.82	49.34	50.41	50.41	868	SB	5541	5
6	Nafissatou Thiam	Belgium	x	48.04	–	48.04	822	SB	5839	2
7	Odile Ahouanwanou	Benin	46.74	41.69	x	46.74	797	PB	5425	8
8	Verena Preiner	Austria	43.39	45.30	46.68	46.68	796		5579	3
9	Kateřina Cachová	Czech Republic	46.11	42.70	45.02	46.11	785		5120	17
10	Kendell Williams	United States	x	41.91	45.12	45.12	766	SB	5558	4
11	Katarina Johnson-Thompson	Great Britain & N.I.	42.21	43.93	40.55	43.93	743	PB	5976	1
12	Erica Bougard	United States	40.34	43.48	42.76	43.48	734		5502	7
13	Chari Hawkins	United States	40.07	x	x	40.07	669		5205	14
14	Solène Ndama	France	x	34.55	37.62	37.62	622	PB	5193	15
15	Marthe Koala	Burkina Faso	37.59	x	x	37.59	621		5328	10
16	Hanne Maudens	Belgium	34.98	36.22	x	36.22	595		5167	16
17	Annie Kunz	United States	x	35.36	27.47	35.36	579		5253	12
18	Noor Vidts	Belgium	33.06	33.58	33.17	33.58	545		5109	18
	Maria Huntington	Finland				DNS				

=== 800 metres ===
The 800 metres event was started on 4 October at 00:05.

Rank	Heat	Athlete	Nationality	Result	Points	Notes	Overall	
Rank	Heat	Athlete	Nationality	Result	Points	Notes	Pts	Rank
1	2	Katarina Johnson-Thompson	Great Britain & N.I.	2.07.26	1005	PB	6981	1
2	2	Verena Preiner	Austria	2:08.88	981		6560	3
3	2	Erica Bougard	United States	2:09.74	968		6470	4
4	1	Hanne Maudens	Belgium	2:12.98	921		6088	11
5	1	Ekaterina Voronina	Uzbekistan	2:15.40	887		6099	10
6	2	Emma Oosterwegel	Netherlands	2:15.86	881		6250	7
7	1	Noor Vidts	Belgium	2:15.94	880		5989	15
8	1	Géraldine Ruckstuhl	Switzerland	2:16.02	878		6159	9
9	1	Chari Hawkins	United States	2:16.78	868	SB	6073	12
10	1	Kateřina Cachová	Czech Republic	2:16.85	867	SB	5987	16
11	2	Kendell Williams	United States	2:17.54	857		6415	5
12	2	Nadine Broersen	Netherlands	2:18.01	851		6392	6
13	1	Solène Ndama	France	2:18.75	841		6034	14
14	2	Nafissatou Thiam	Belgium	2:18.93	838	SB	6677	2
15	1	Annie Kunz	United States	2:20.68	814		6067	13
16	2	Odile Ahouanwanou	Benin	2:22.89	785	SB	6210	8
	1	Marthe Koala	Burkina Faso	DNS			DNF	
	2	Anouk Vetter	Netherlands	DNS			DNF	

=== Final standings ===
The final standings were as follows:

The highest mark recorded in each event is highlighted in yellow

Rank	Athlete	Nationality	100mh	HJ	SP	200m	LJ	JT	800m	Total	Notes
1st place, gold medalist(s)	Katarina Johnson-Thompson	Great Britain & N.I.	13.09	1.95	13.86	23.08	6.77	43.93	2:07.26	6981	WL
2nd place, silver medalist(s)	Nafissatou Thiam	Belgium	13.36	1.95	15.22	24.60	6.40	48.04	2:18.93	6677	
3rd place, bronze medalist(s)	Verena Preiner	Austria	13.25	1.77	14.21	23.96	6.36	46.68	2:08.88	6560	
4	Erica Bougard	United States	13.01	1.86	12.36	23.89	6.21	43.48	2:09.74	6470	
5	Kendell Williams	United States	12.58	1.77	12.71	23.62	6.28	45.12	2:17.54	6415	
6	Nadine Broersen	Netherlands	13.61	1.83	14.75	25.28	6.22	50.41	2:18.01	6392	
7	Emma Oosterwegel	Netherlands	13.65	1.77	13.70	25.10	5.87	54.01	2:15.86	6250	PB
8	Odile Ahouanwanou	Benin	13.45	1.77	14.13	24.05	6.00	46.74	2:22.89	6210	NR
9	Géraldine Ruckstuhl	Switzerland	13.84	1.71	14.28	25.21	5.73	55.35	2:16.02	6159	
10	Ekaterina Voronina	Uzbekistan	14.64	1.80	13.66	25.03	5.83	51.60	2:15.40	6099	
11	Hanne Maudens	Belgium	13.90	1.71	13.12	23.81	6.41	36.22	2:12.98	6088	
12	Chari Hawkins	United States	13.23	1.77	13.59	24.81	5.95	40.07	2:16.78	6073	
13	Annie Kunz	United States	13.27	1.80	14.58	24.37	5.95	35.36	2:20.68	6067	
14	Solène Ndama	France	12.90	1.71	13.68	24.34	5.98	37.62	2:18.75	6034	
15	Noor Vidts	Belgium	13.58	1.77	13.55	24.46	6.11	33.58	2:15.94	5989	
16	Kateřina Cachová	Czech Republic	13.47	1.74	12.58	24.95	5.79	46.11	2:16.85	5987	
	Anouk Vetter	Netherlands	13.55	1.74	14.10	24.43	6.20	54.17	DNF	DNF	
	Marthe Koala	Burkina Faso	13.05	1.74	13.28	24.29	6.44	37.59	DNS	DNF	
	Maria Huntington	Finland	13.32	1.83	12.21	24.72	DNS	–	–	DNF	
	Ivona Dadic	Austria	DQ	DNS	–	–	–	–	–	DNF	
