= 2019 World Athletics Championships – Women's pole vault =

Women's pole vault at the 2019 World Championships
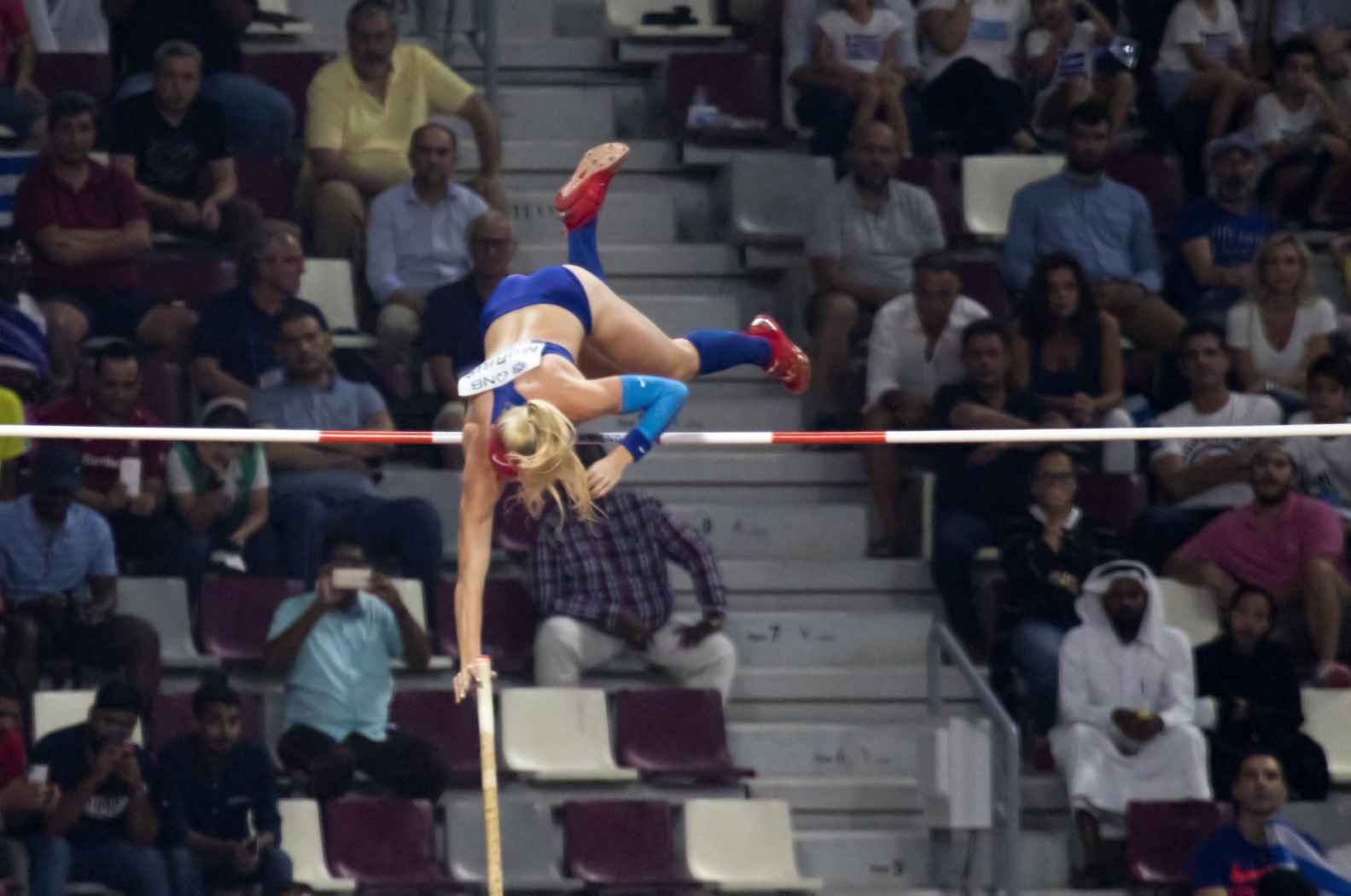
- Sandi Morris at Doha 2019
- Venue: Khalifa International Stadium
- Dates: 27 September (qualification); 29 September (final)
- Competitors: 32 from 22 nations
- Winning height: 4.95

Medalists
gold medal	Anzhelika Sidorova	Authorised Neutral Athletes
silver medal	Sandi Morris	United States
bronze medal	Katerina Stefanidi	Greece

Video on YouTube Official Video

The women's pole vault at the 2019 World Athletics Championships was held at the Khalifa International Stadium in Doha, Qatar, from 27 to 29 September 2019.

== Summary ==
During qualifications, 17 women made it to the final by clearing 4.60 m. In the final, they started at 4.50 m but jumped next to 4.70 m, taking the field down to a dozen, nine still with clean rounds. At 4.80 m, six were over, but only Anzhelika Sidorova and Sandi Morris were still clean. At 4.85 m, defending and Olympic champion Katerina Stefanidi missed once, while Morris and Sidorova remained clean. Angelica Bengtsson, Alysha Newman, and Holly Bradshaw could not get over the bar. Bradshaw saved one attempt for 4.90 m but missed, and then Stefanidi missed. When Morris and Sidorova cleared on their first attempts, Stefanidi saved her two remaining attempts for 4.95 m. At this height, only three women had ever cleared 4.95 m (16 ft 2 3/4 in), one of them Morris, who had done it four times. Through the first two rounds of attempts, nobody cleared, eliminating Stefanidi with the bronze. On her final attempt, Morris missed. Then, Sidorova cleared. The tie was broken, and Sidorova became only the fourth woman in history to clear 4.95 m.

Morris congratulated her opponent after the winning vault, an act which earned her a place on the shortlist for the International Fair Play Award that year.

The final is noted as one of the best finals in the history of the World Championships. Six women cleared 4.80 m, a record for the event. Prior to 2019, the maximum number of women who cleared 4.80 m in a World Championship final was three, in 2013 and 2015. In fact, the winning height of 4.95 m would have won all previous World Championships except for 2005 when Yelena Isinbayeva won with a then-world record of 5.01 m.

== Records ==
Before the competition records were as follows:

Record	Perf.	Athlete	Nat.	Date	Location
World	5.06	Yelena Isinbayeva	RUS	28 Aug 2009	Zürich, Switzerland
Championship	5.01	Yelena Isinbayeva	RUS	12 Aug 2005	Helsinki, Finland
World leading	4.91	Jennifer Suhr	USA	30 Mar 2019	Austin, United States
African	4.42	Elmarie Gerryts	RSA	12 Jun 2000	Wesel, Germany
Asian	4.72	Li Ling	CHN	18 May 2019	Shanghai, China
NACAC	5.02 i	Jennifer Suhr	USA	2 Mar 2013	Albuquerque, United States
South American	4.87	Fabiana Murer	BRA	3 Jul 2016	São Bernardo do Campo, Brazil
European	5.06	Yelena Isinbayeva	RUS	28 Aug 2009	Zürich, Switzerland
Oceanian	4.94	Eliza McCartney	NZL	17 Jul 2018	Jockgrim, Germany

== Schedule ==
The event schedule, in local time (UTC+3), was as follows:

Date	Time	Round
27 September	17:30	Qualification
29 September	20:01	Final

== Results ==
=== Qualification ===
Qualification: 4.60 m (Q) or at least 12 best performers (q).

Rank	Group	Name	Nationality	4.20	4.35	4.50	4.55	4.60	Mark	Notes
1	A	Holly Bradshaw	Great Britain & N.I.	–	–	–	–	o	4.60	Q
1	B	Sandi Morris	United States	–	–	o	–	o	4.60	Q
1	A	Katie Nageotte	United States	–	–	o	–	o	4.60	Q
1	A	Alysha Newman	Canada	–	o	o	–	o	4.60	Q
1	B	Katerina Stefanidi	Greece	–	–	–	–	o	4.60	Q
1	A	Anzhelika Sidorova	Authorised Neutral Athletes	–	–	–	–	o	4.60	Q
1	A	Iryna Zhuk	Belarus	–	o	o	–	o	4.60	Q
8	A	Nikoleta Kiriakopoulou	Greece	–	–	xo	–	o	4.60	Q
8	B	Yarisley Silva	Cuba	–	–	o	xo	o	4.60	Q
10	A	Li Ling	China	–	o	xxo	–	o	4.60	Q
11	A	Angelica Moser	Switzerland	o	o	o	o	xo	4.60	Q
11	B	Robeilys Peinado	Venezuela	o	o	o	o	xo	4.60	Q
11	B	Jennifer Suhr	United States	–	–	–	–	xo	4.60	Q
14	A	Lisa Ryzih	Germany	–	o	xo	–	xo	4.60	Q
15	B	Angelica Bengtsson	Sweden	–	–	o	–	xxo	4.60	Q
16	B	Ninon Guillon-Romarin	France	–	o	xo	–	xxo	4.60	Q
17	B	Tina Šutej	Slovenia	o	o	o	xxo	xxo	4.60	Q
18	B	Nicole Büchler	Switzerland	–	o	xo	xo	xxx	4.55	SB
19	B	Xu Huiqin	China	–	o	o	xxx		4.50	
20	A	Fanny Smets	Belgium	o	xo	o	xxx		4.50	
21	A	Maryna Kylypko	Ukraine	o	o	xxo	xxx		4.50	
22	B	Kelsie Ahbe	Canada	o	o	xxx			4.35	
22	A	Romana Maláčová	Czech Republic	o	o	xxx			4.35	
22	A	Wilma Murto	Finland	o	o	xxx			4.35	
25	A	Michaela Meijer	Sweden	xo	o	xxx			4.35	
25	B	Lene Onsrud Retzius	Norway	xo	o	xxx			4.35	
27	B	Alyona Lutkovskaya	Authorised Neutral Athletes	o	xo	xxx			4.35	
28	B	Liz Parnov	Australia	xo	xo	xxx			4.35	
29	A	Roberta Bruni	Italy	o	xxo	xxx			4.35	
29	B	Irina Ivanova	Authorised Neutral Athletes	o	xxo	xxx			4.35	
31	A	Killiana Heymans	Netherlands	o	xxx				4.20	
	B	Katharina Bauer	Germany	xxx					NH	

=== Final ===
The final was started on 29 September at 20:01.

Rank	Name	Nationality	4.50	4.70	4.80	4.85	4.90	4.95	Mark	Notes
1st place, gold medalist(s)	Anzhelika Sidorova	Authorised Neutral Athletes	o	o	o	o	o	xxo	4.95	WL, PB
2nd place, silver medalist(s)	Sandi Morris	United States	o	o	o	o	o	xxx	4.90	SB
3rd place, bronze medalist(s)	Katerina Stefanidi	Greece	o	o	xo	xo	x-	xx	4.85	SB
4	Holly Bradshaw	Great Britain & N.I.	o	o	xo	xx-	x		4.80	
5	Alysha Newman	Canada	xo	o	xo	xxx			4.80	
6	Angelica Bengtsson	Sweden	o	xxo	xxo	xxx			4.80	=NR
7	Katie Nageotte	United States	o	o	xxx				4.70	
7	Robeilys Peinado	Venezuela	o	o	xxx				4.70	=NR
7	Jenn Suhr	United States	–	o	xxx				4.70	
7	Iryna Zhuk	Belarus	o	o	xx-	x			4.70	=NR
11	Yarisley Silva	Cuba	xxo	o	xxx				4.70	
12	Ninon Guillon-Romarin	France	o	xo	xxx				4.70	
13	Nikoleta Kiriakopoulou	Greece	o	xxx					4.50	
13	Li Ling	China	o	x-	xx				4.50	
13	Angelica Moser	Switzerland	o	xxx					4.50	
13	Tina Šutej	Slovenia	o	xxx					4.50	
17	Lisa Ryzih	Germany	xo	xxx					4.50	
