= Belarus at the 2019 World Athletics Championships =

- WA code: BLR

in Doha, Qatar
- Competitors: 30 (11 men and 19 women) in 21 events
- Medals: Gold 0 Silver 0 Bronze 0 Total 0

World Athletics Championships appearances
- 1993; 1995; 1997; 1999; 2001; 2003; 2005; 2007; 2009; 2011; 2013; 2015; 2017; 2019; 2022; 2023

Belarus competed at the 2019 World Athletics Championships in Doha, Qatar from 27 September to 6 October 2019.

== Results ==
(q – qualified, NM – no mark, SB – season best)

=== Men ===
Track and road events

| Athlete | Event | Heat | | Semifinal | | Final | |
| Athlete | Event | Result | Rank | Result | Rank | Result | Rank |
|---|---|---|---|---|---|---|---|
| Uladzislau Pramau | Marathon | — | | | | 2:31:04 | 53 |
| Vitali Parakhonka | 110 m hurdles | 13.65 | 23 | did not advance | | | |
| Aliaksandr Liakhovich | 20 km walk | — | | | | 1:44:25 | 40 |
| Dzmitry Dziubin | 50 km walk | — | | | | did not finish | |

Field events

| Athlete | Event | Qualification | | Final | |
| Athlete | Event | Result | Rank | Result | Rank |
|---|---|---|---|---|---|
| Maksim Nedasekau | High jump | 2.26 | 11 q | 2.33 | 4 |
| Dzmitry Nabokau | High jump | 2.26 | 18 | did not advance | |
| Hleb Dudarau | Hammer throw | 76.28 | 11 q | 76.00 | 8 |
| Zakhar Makhrosenka | Hammer throw | 74.80 | 15 | did not advance | |
| Aliaksei Katkavets | Javelin throw | 82.08 | 14 | did not advance | |
| Pavel Mialeshka | Javelin throw | 75.14 | 27 | did not advance | |

Combined events – Decathlon

| Athlete | Event | 100 m | LJ | SP | HJ | 400 m | 110H | DT | PV | JT | 1500 m | Final | Rank |
|---|---|---|---|---|---|---|---|---|---|---|---|---|---|
| Vital Zhuk | Result | 10.95 | 6.63 | 15.13 | 1.96 | 48.08 | 14.49 | 46.64 | 4.80 SB | 58.66 | 4:35.45 | 8058 | 13 |
| Vital Zhuk | Points | 872 | 727 | 798 | 767 | 905 | 912 | 801 | 849 | 718 | 709 | 8058 | 13 |

=== Women ===
Track and road events

| Athlete | Event | Heat | | Semifinal | | Final | |
| Athlete | Event | Result | Rank | Result | Rank | Result | Rank |
|---|---|---|---|---|---|---|---|
| Krystsina Tsimanouskaya | 200 m | 23.22 | 26 | did not advance | | | |
| Daryia Barysevich | 1500 m | 4:08.19 | 18 q | 4:17.04 | 21 | did not advance | |
| Volha Mazuronak | Marathon | — | | | | 2:36:21 | 5 |
| Nastassia Ivanova | Marathon | — | | | | 2:48:41 | 17 |
| Sviatlana Kudzelich | Marathon | — | | | | 3:00:38 | 32 |
| Elvira Herman | 100 m hurdles | 12.84 | 12 Q | 12.78 | 9 | did not advance | |
| Darya Paluektava | 20 km walk | — | | | | 1:37:42 | 14 |
| Nastassia Yatsevich | 50 km walk | — | | | | 4:44:01 | 12 |
| Nadzeya Darazhuk | 50 km walk | — | | | | 4:47:26 | 13 |

Field events

| Athlete | Event | Qualification | | Final | |
| Athlete | Event | Result | Rank | Result | Rank |
|---|---|---|---|---|---|
| Karyna Demidik | High jump | 1.94 | 1 Q | 1.96 | 6 |
| Iryna Zhuk | Pole vault | 4.60 | 1 Q | 4.70 =NR | 7 |
| Nastassia Mironchyk-Ivanova | Long jump | 6.69 | 7 q | 6.76 | 5 |
| Iryna Vaskouskaya | Triple jump | 13.67 | 21 | did not advance | |
| Aliona Dubitskaya | Shot put | 18.51 | 8 Q | 18.86 | 6 |
| Alena Pasechnik | Shot put | 17.55 | 18 | did not advance | |
| Hanna Malyshik | Hammer throw | 72.59 | 8 Q | 71.24 | 10 |
| Alena Sobaleva | Hammer throw | 71.52 SB | 11 q | 70.45 | 11 |
| Anastasya Kalamoyets | Hammer throw | 69.67 | 16 | did not advance | |
| Tatsiana Khaladovich | Javelin throw | 61.74 | 8 q | 62.54 | 6 |
