= Barbados at the 2019 World Athletics Championships =

- WA code: BAR
- National federation: Athletics Association of Barbados
- Website: aab.sports.bb

in Doha, Qatar 27 September 2019 – 6 October 2019
- Competitors: 4 in 4 events
- Medals: Gold 0 Silver 0 Bronze 0 Total 0

World Athletics Championships appearances
- 1983; 1987; 1991; 1993; 1995; 1997; 1999; 2001; 2003; 2005; 2007; 2009; 2011; 2013; 2015; 2017; 2019; 2022; 2023

Barbados competed at the 2019 World Athletics Championships in Doha, Qatar, from 27 September to 6 October 2019.

== Results ==
Key

- Q = Qualified for the next round
- q = Qualified for the next round as a fastest loser or, in field events, by position without achieving the qualifying target
- NR = National record
- PB = Personal best
- SB = Season best
- N/A = Round not applicable for the event

=== Men ===
Track and road events

Athlete	Event	Heat		Semifinal		Final	
Athlete	Event	Result	Rank	Result	Rank	Result	Rank
Mario Burke	100 metres	10.31	31	Did not advance			
Shane Brathwaite	110 metres hurdles	13.51	17 Q	14.29	24 q	13.61	6

=== Women ===
Track and road events

Athlete	Event	Heat		Semifinal		Final	
Athlete	Event	Result	Rank	Result	Rank	Result	Rank
Sada Williams	400 metres	52.14	28 Q	51.31 PB	10	Did not advance	
Tia-Adana Belle	400 metres hurdles	57.37	33	Did not advance			
