= Austria at the 2023 World Athletics Championships =

- Flag of Austria
- WA code: AUT

in Budapest, Hungary 19−27 August 2025
- Competitors: 8 (3 men and 5 women)
- Medals: Gold 0 Silver 0 Bronze 0 Total 0

World Athletics Championships appearances (overview)
- 1983; 1987; 1991; 1993; 1995; 1997; 1999; 2001; 2003; 2005; 2007; 2009; 2011; 2013; 2015; 2017; 2019; 2022; 2023; 2025

Austria competed at the 2023 World Athletics Championships in Budapest, Hungary, from 19 to 27 August 2023.

== Results ==
Austria entered 8 athletes.

Key

- Q = Qualified for the next round
- q = Qualified for the next round as a fastest loser or, in field events, by position without achieving the qualifying target
- NR = National record
- PB = Personal best
- SB = Season best
- N/A = Round not applicable for the event

=== Men ===
Track and road events

Athlete	Event	Heat		Semifinal		Final	
Athlete	Event	Result	Rank	Result	Rank	Result	Rank
Markus Fuchs	100 metres	10.43	7	Did not advance			
Raphael Pallitsch	1500 metres	3:36.47 PB	12	Did not advance			

Field events

Athlete	Event	Qualification		Final	
Athlete	Event	Distance	Position	Distance	Position
Lukas Weißhaidinger	Discus throw	65.61	5 q	65.54	7

=== Women ===
Track and road events

Athlete	Event	Heat		Semifinal		Final	
Athlete	Event	Result	Rank	Result	Rank	Result	Rank
Susanne Gogl-Walli	200 metres	23.38	5	Did not advance			
Susanne Gogl-Walli	400 metres	51.00	4 q	51.50	7	Did not advance	
Lena Pressler	400 metres hurdles	57.90	8	Did not advance			
Julia Mayer	Marathon	—N/a				2:41:54	50

Field events

Athlete	Event	Qualification		Final	
Athlete	Event	Distance	Position	Distance	Position
Victoria Hudson	Javelin throw	62.96	4 Q	62.92	5

Combined events – Heptathlon

Athlete	Event	100H	HJ	SP	200 m	LJ	JT	800 m	Final	Rank
Sarah Lagger	Result	14.21	1.77	13.78	25.86	5.85	43.79	2:15.32	5910	17
Sarah Lagger	Points	949	941	779	809	804	740	888	5910	17
