= 2019 World Athletics Championships – Women's javelin throw =

Women's javelin throw at the 2019 World Championships
- Venue: Khalifa International Stadium
- Dates: 30 September (qualification); 1 October (final)
- Competitors: 31 from 21 nations
- Winning distance: 66.56

Medalists
gold medal	Kelsey-Lee Barber	Australia
silver medal	Liu Shiying	China
bronze medal	Lü Huihui	China

The women's javelin throw at the 2019 World Athletics Championships was held at the Khalifa International Stadium in Doha, Qatar, on 30 September and 1 October 2019.

== Summary ==
On the second throw of the competition, returning bronze medalist Lü Huihui took the lead with a 64.93m. Three throwers later, her Chinese teammate Liu Shiying almost matched that with a 64.81m effort. Defending champion Barbora Špotáková fouled. The third-place thrower was Kelsey-Lee Barber, almost two metres behind. In the second round, Lü improved to 65.06m and Christin Hussong landed one only a centimetre behind, while Špotáková only managed a 59.52m. By the time of Špotáková's third attempt, she already knew Tatsiana Khaladovich held the #8 spot with 60.84m. She at least needed to beat that to continue in the competition, but her throw was almost a metre short. With a new champion destined, nobody improved through the fourth round. In the fifth, Liu threw a 65.88m to take the lead. Lü responded with a 65.49m but still not enough. On her final attempt, Barber tossed a 66.56 m (218 ft 4 in) to jump from a distant fourth place to take the gold medal.

== Records ==
Before the competition records were as follows:

Record	Dist.	Athlete	Nat.	Date	Location
World	72.28	Barbora Špotáková	CZE	13 Sep 2008	Stuttgart, Germany
Championship	71.70	Osleidys Menéndez	CUB	14 Aug 2005	Helsinki, Finland
World leading	67.98	Lü Huihui	CHN	2 Aug 2019	Shenyang, China
African	69.35	Sunette Viljoen	RSA	9 Jun 2012	New York, United States
Asian	67.98	Lü Huihui	CHN	2 Aug 2019	Shenyang, China
NACAC	71.70	Osleidys Menéndez	CUB	14 Aug 2005	Helsinki, Finland
South American	63.84	Flor Ruiz	COL	25 Jun 2016	Cali, Colombia
European	72.28	Barbora Špotáková	CZE	13 Sep 2008	Stuttgart, Germany
Oceanian	68.92	Kathryn Mitchell	AUS	11 Apr 2018	Gold Coast, Australia

== Schedule ==
The event schedule, in local time (UTC+3), was as follows:

Date	Time	Round
30 September	16:30	Qualification
1 October	21:20	Final

=== Qualification ===
Qualification: Qualifying distance 63.50 (Q) or the 12 best athletes including ties (q) advanced to the final.

Rank	Group	Name	Nationality	Round			Mark	Notes
Rank	Group	Name	Nationality	1	2	3	Mark	Notes
1	B	Lü Huihui	China	62.90	67.27		67.27	Q
2	B	Christin Hussong	Germany	65.29			65.29	Q
3	A	Liu Shiying	China	62.35	63.48	61.56	63.48	q
4	A	Martina Ratej	Slovenia	60.78	62.87	–	62.87	q
5	A	Annu Rani	India	57.05	62.43	60.50	62.43	q, NR
6	B	Barbora Špotáková	Czech Republic	x	58.27	62.15	62.15	q
7	B	Kara Winger	United States	60.56	61.51	62.13	62.13	q
8	B	Tatsiana Khaladovich	Belarus	x	61.74	x	61.74	q
9	A	Nikola Ogrodníková	Czech Republic	x	50.95	61.17	61.17	q
10	A	Kelsey-Lee Barber	Australia	61.08	58.95	58.20	61.08	q
11	A	Sara Kolak	Croatia	60.03	x	60.99	60.99	q
12	B	Irena Šedivá	Czech Republic	55.51	60.90	x	60.90	q
13	A	Haruka Kitaguchi	Japan	57.34	60.84	60.54	60.84	
14	B	Alexie Alaïs	France	57.37	60.46	56.83	60.46	
15	A	Ariana Ince	United States	60.44	x	58.08	60.44	
16	A	Elizabeth Gleadle	Canada	57.35	59.22	60.17	60.17	
17	B	Sunette Viljoen	South Africa	60.10	56.56	55.57	60.10	
18	A	Madara Palameika	Latvia	59.95	x	x	59.95	
19	B	Su Lingdan	China	58.56	53.73	x	58.56	
20	A	Eda Tuğsuz	Turkey	56.98	x	58.28	58.28	
21	A	Annika Fuchs	Germany	57.10	58.16	56.74	58.16	
22	B	Maria Andrejczyk	Poland	57.68	55.39	56.28	57.68	
23	B	Liveta Jasiūnaitė	Lithuania	56.90	55.15	55.97	56.90	
24	A	Anete Kociņa	Latvia	x	x	56.70	56.70	
25	B	Réka Szilágyi	Hungary	54.37	53.94	56.26	56.26	
26	B	Hanna Hatsko-Fedusova	Ukraine	54.79	55.84	x	55.84	
27	B	Līna Mūze	Latvia	55.66	x	55.11	55.66	
28	A	Laila Domingos	Brazil	55.44	52.03	55.49	55.49	
29	B	Yuka Sato	Japan	51.88	x	55.03	55.03	
30	A	Yu Yuzhen	China	53.38	49.26	48.11	53.38	
31	A	Victoria Hudson	Austria	52.51	x	x	52.51	

=== Final ===
The final was started on 1 October at 21:22.

Rank	Name	Nationality	Round						Mark	Notes
Rank	Name	Nationality	1	2	3	4	5	6	Mark	Notes
1st place, gold medalist(s)	Kelsey-Lee Barber	Australia	62.95	61.40	58.34	60.90	63.65	66.56	66.56	
2nd place, silver medalist(s)	Liu Shiying	China	64.81	62.61	64.82	61.82	65.88	65.75	65.88	SB
3rd place, bronze medalist(s)	Lü Huihui	China	64.93	65.06	65.00	62.31	65.49	62.61	65.49	
4	Christin Hussong	Germany	60.58	65.05	60.26	60.84	62.25	65.21	65.21	
5	Kara Winger	United States	57.96	61.77	62.88	x	63.23	62.40	63.23	
6	Tatsiana Khaladovich	Belarus	x	60.84	62.54	62.23	60.51	61.98	62.54	
7	Sara Kolak	Croatia	58.22	62.22	60.93	57.09	62.28	56.21	62.28	
8	Annu Rani	India	59.25	61.12	60.20	60.40	58.49	57.93	61.12	
9	Barbora Špotáková	Czech Republic	x	59.52	59.87				59.87	
10	Martina Ratej	Slovenia	58.98	57.22	57.32				58.98	
11	Nikola Ogrodníková	Czech Republic	x	56.01	57.24				57.24	
12	Irena Šedivá	Czech Republic	55.73	x	55.86				55.86	
