= 2019 World Athletics Championships – Women's 100 metres hurdles =

2019 WC Women's 100m hurdles

Women's 100 metres hurdles at the 2019 World Championships
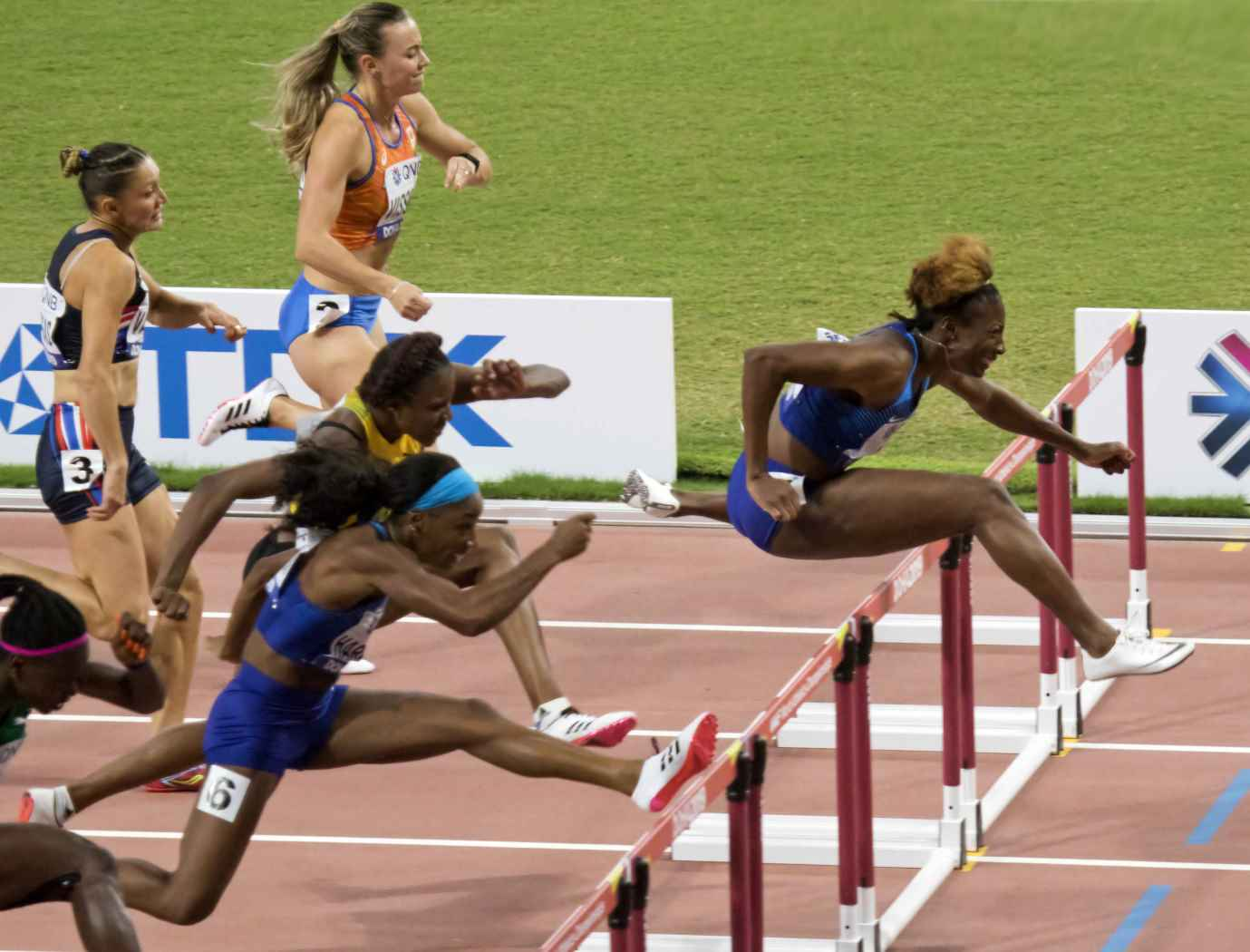
- The final of the event.
- Venue: Khalifa International Stadium
- Dates: 5 October (heats); 6 October (semi-finals & final)
- Competitors: 38 from 25 nations
- Winning time: 12.34

Medalists
gold medal	Nia Ali	United States
silver medal	Kendra Harrison	United States
bronze medal	Danielle Williams	Jamaica

The women's 100 metres hurdles at the 2019 World Athletics Championships was held at the Khalifa International Stadium in Doha, Qatar, from 5 to 6 October 2019.

== Summary ==
This event lost its defending champion when Sally Pearson retired from the sport two months earlier. The Olympic champion Brianna McNeal disappeared quickly after twitching in her blocks before the gun and being disqualified for a false start in her heat. Even after losing the =#4 and #6 runners in history, the final still sported the world record holder, Kendra Harrison, the season's world leader Danielle Williams with the #7 time in history set a little over two months earlier and the #16 runner in history Janeek Brown from winning the NCAA Championships 4 months earlier, the last two among three Jamaicans who made it to the final.

At the gun of the final, Harrison and Williams got out together with the lead. In lane 9, Megan Tapper got one of the worst starts imaginable to a world championship final, stuttering to the first hurdle and hitting it. By the second hurdle, Olympic silver medalist Nia Ali joined Harrison and Williams in the lead. Over the next two hurdles, Ali and Williams mirrored each other as Harrison lost a few inches. As they cleared the sixth hurdle, Williams began losing ground, as Ali pressed a definite advantage which she continued to expand over the remaining hurdles. Harrison also went past Williams as Tobi Amusan was gaining from behind. Ali crossed the finish line with more than a metre over Harrison. Harrison held off Amusan to get bronze.

Ali's 12.34 winning time took a tenth of a second off her personal best, moving her from =#26 of all time to =#9 with Sharika Nelvis. In fifth place, Andrea Vargas improved her own Costa Rican national record for the fourth time in the 2019 season.

== Records ==
Before the competition records were as follows:

Record	Perf.	Athlete	Nat.	Date	Location
World	12.20	Kendra Harrison	USA	22 Jul 2016	London, Great Britain
Championship	12.28	Sally Pearson	AUS	3 Sep 2011	Daegu, South Korea
World Leading	12.32	Danielle Williams	JAM	20 Jul 2019	London, Great Britain
African	12.44	Glory Alozie	NGR	8 Aug 1998	Fontvieille, Monaco
African	12.44	Glory Alozie	NGR	28 Aug 1998	Brussels, Belgium
African	12.44	Glory Alozie	NGR	28 Aug 1999	Seville, Spain
Asian	12.44	Olga Shishigina	KAZ	27 Jun 1995	Luzern, Switzerland
NACAC	12.20	Kendra Harrison	USA	22 Jul 2016	London, Great Britain
South American	12.71	Maurren Maggi	BRA	19 May 2001	Manaus, Brazil
European	12.21	Yordanka Donkova	BUL	20 Aug 1988	Stara Zagora, Bulgaria
Oceanian	12.28	Sally Pearson	AUS	3 Sep 2011	Daegu, South Korea

The following records were set at the competition:

Record	Perf.	Athlete	Nat.	Date
Costa Rican	12.68	Andrea Vargas	CRC	5 Oct 2019
Dutch	12.62	Nadine Visser	NED	6 Oct 2019
Costa Rican	12.65	Andrea Vargas	CRC	6 Oct 2019
Costa Rican	12.64	Andrea Vargas	CRC	6 Oct 2019

== Schedule ==
The event schedule, in local time (UTC+3), was as follows:

Date	Time	Round
5 October	17:15	Heats
6 October	19:02	Semi-finals
6 October	20:50	Final

== Results ==
=== Heats ===
The first four in each heat (Q) and the next four fastest (q) qualified for the semi-final.

Rank	Heat	Lane	Name	Nationality	Time	Notes
1	5	9	Tobi Amusan	Nigeria	12.48	Q, PB
2	3	5	Danielle Williams	Jamaica	12.51	Q
3	4	4	Kendra Harrison	United States	12.55	Q
4	1	7	Nia Ali	United States	12.59	Q
5	5	4	Janeek Brown	Jamaica	12.61	Q
6	3	8	Andrea Vargas	Costa Rica	12.68	Q, NR
7	5	5	Nadine Visser	Netherlands	12.75	Q
8	4	8	Cindy Roleder	Germany	12.76	Q, SB
9	5	7	Karolina Kołeczek	Poland	12.78	Q
10	1	4	Megan Tapper	Jamaica	12.78	Q
11	2	8	Luminosa Bogliolo	Italy	12.80	Q
12	4	3	Elvira Herman	Belarus	12.84	Q
13	2	7	Yanique Thompson	Jamaica	12.85	Q
14	2	4	Anne Zagré	Belgium	12.91	Q, SB
15	5	3	Nooralotta Neziri	Finland	12.92	q
16	4	2	Reetta Hurske	Finland	12.96	Q
17	5	6	Rikenette Steenkamp	South Africa	12.97	q, SB
18	3	3	Annimari Korte	Finland	12.97	Q
19	1	2	Cindy Ofili	Great Britain & N.I.	12.97	Q
20	5	2	Michelle Jenneke	Australia	12.98	q, SB
21	3	6	Luca Kozák	Hungary	13.00	Q
22	3	7	Beate Schrott	Austria	13.08	q
23	2	5	Brianna Beahan	Australia	13.11	Q
24	4	5	Gréta Kerekes	Hungary	13.11	
25	3	4	Celeste Mucci	Australia	13.14	
26	1	9	Génesis Romero	Venezuela	13.14	Q
27	4	7	Vanessa Clerveaux	Haiti	13.15	
28	2	6	Ayako Kimura	Japan	13.19	
29	1	5	Asuka Terada	Japan	13.20	
30	4	6	Hanna Plotitsyna	Ukraine	13.30	
31	1	8	Stanislava Škvarková	Slovakia	13.44	
32	5	8	Laura Valette	France	13.47	
33	3	2	Phylicia George	Canada	13.49	
34	2	2	Fanny Quenot	France	13.51	
35	1	6	Adrine Monagi	Papua New Guinea	14.00	
36	4	9	Irina Velihanova	Turkmenistan	14.79	
	1	3	Solène Ndama	France	DNF	
	2	3	Brianna McNeal	United States	DSQ	162.8

=== Semi-finals ===
The first two in each heat (Q) and the next two fastest (q) qualified for the final.

Rank	Heat	Lane	Name	Nationality	Time	Notes
1	1	6	Danielle Williams	Jamaica	12.41	Q
2	1	7	Nia Ali	United States	12.44	Q, PB
3	3	5	Tobi Amusan	Nigeria	12.48	Q, PB
4	2	5	Kendra Harrison	United States	12.58	Q
5	2	4	Megan Tapper	Jamaica	12.61	Q, PB
6	1	5	Nadine Visser	Netherlands	12.62	q, NR
7	3	7	Janeek Brown	Jamaica	12.62	Q
8	3	4	Andrea Vargas	Costa Rica	12.65	q, NR
9	3	6	Elvira Herman	Belarus	12.78	
10	2	6	Yanique Thompson	Jamaica	12.80	SB
11	1	4	Cindy Roleder	Germany	12.86	
12	2	8	Karolina Kołeczek	Poland	12.86	
13	1	8	Luca Kozák	Hungary	12.87	SB
14	2	2	Nooralotta Neziri	Finland	12.89	SB
15	2	9	Cindy Ofili	Great Britain & N.I.	12.95	
16	2	3	Rikenette Steenkamp	South Africa	12.96	SB
17	1	9	Annimari Korte	Finland	12.97	
18	2	7	Luminosa Bogliolo	Italy	13.06	
19	1	2	Michelle Jenneke	Australia	13.09	
20	1	3	Génesis Romero	Venezuela	13.18	
21	3	8	Reetta Hurske	Finland	13.24	
22	3	3	Beate Schrott	Austria	13.25	
23	3	2	Brianna Beahan	Australia	13.38	
	3	9	Anne Zagré	Belgium	DQ	163.2(b)

=== Final ===
The final was started on 6 October at 20:51.

Rank	Lane	Name	Nationality	Time	Notes
1st place, gold medalist(s)	4	Nia Ali	United States	12.34	PB
2nd place, silver medalist(s)	6	Kendra Harrison	United States	12.46	
3rd place, bronze medalist(s)	5	Danielle Williams	Jamaica	12.47	
4	7	Tobi Amusan	Nigeria	12.49	
5	3	Andrea Vargas	Costa Rica	12.64	NR
6	2	Nadine Visser	Netherlands	12.66	
7	8	Janeek Brown	Jamaica	12.88	
	9	Megan Tapper	Jamaica	DNF	
