= 2019 World Athletics Championships – Women's 400 metres hurdles =

Women's 400 metres hurdles at the 2019 World Athletics Championships
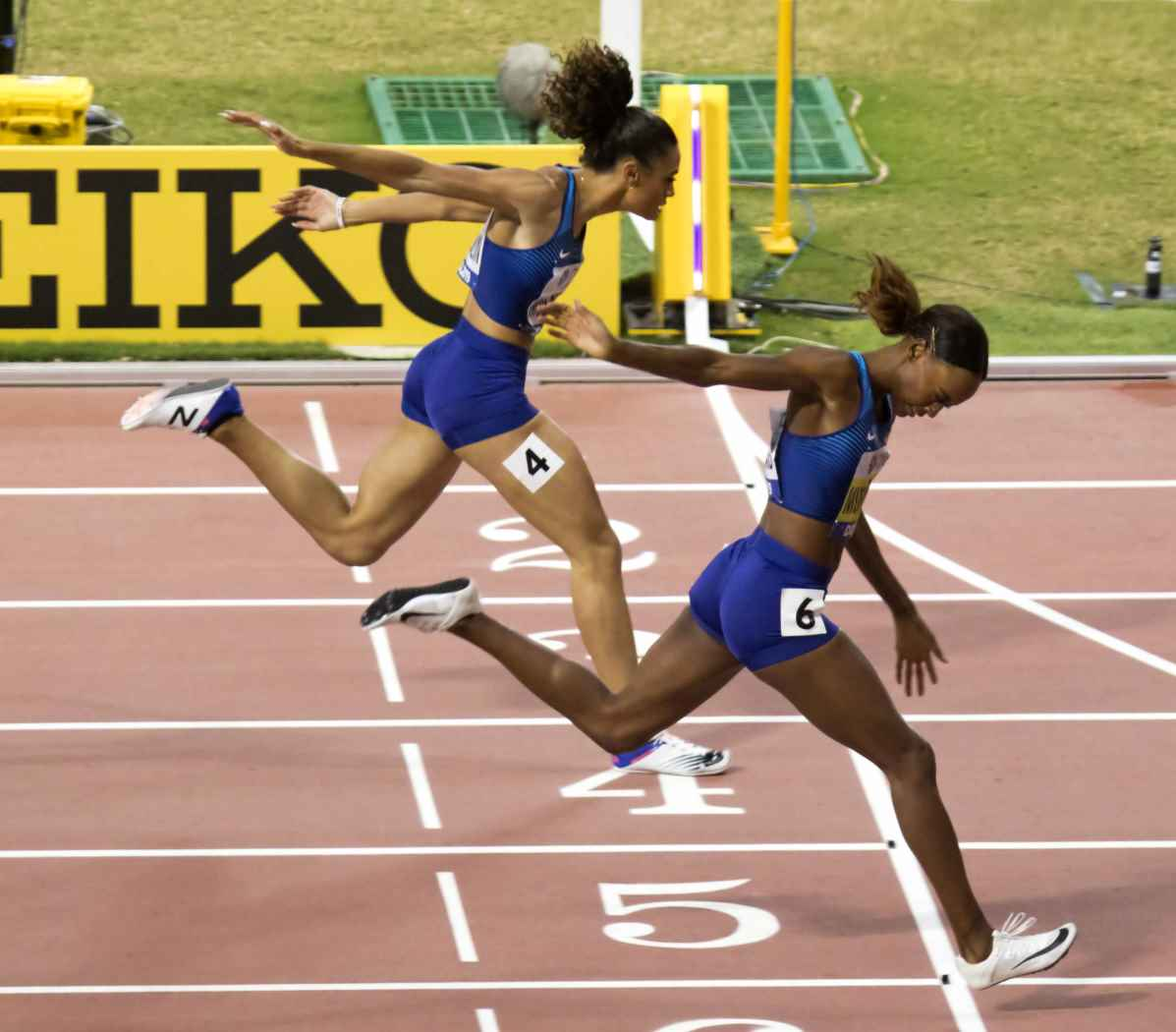
- Dalilah Muhammad (gold) and Sydney McLaughlin (silver) at the finish line during the final.
- Venue: Khalifa International Stadium
- Location: Doha, Qatar
- Dates: 1 October 2019 (round 1); 2 October 2019 (semi-final); 4 October 2019 (final)
- Competitors: 39 from 27 nations
- Winning time: 52.16 s WR

Medalists
gold medal	Dalilah Muhammad	United States
silver medal	Sydney McLaughlin	United States
bronze medal	Rushell Clayton	Jamaica

The women's 400 metres hurdles at the 2019 World Athletics Championships was held over three rounds at the Khalifa International Stadium in Doha, Qatar, from 1 to 4 October 2019. It was the eighteenth time this event was contested at the World Athletics Championships. Athletes could qualify by running the entry standard of 56.00 seconds, by winning selected competitions, or by their position on the IAAF top performance list.

Thirty-nine athletes from twenty-four nations competed in round 1, where twenty-four athletes advanced to the semi-finals, Amalie Iuel of Norway set a national record of 54.72 s, and Portia Bing of New Zealand and Sara Petersen of Denmark were disqualified. In the semi-finals, eight athletes advanced to the final and Sage Watson of Canada set a national record of 54.32 s.

The final was won by Dalilah Muhammad of the United States in a world record of 52.16 s, followed by Sydney McLaughlin of the United States in second place in 52.23 s and Rushell Clayton of Jamaica in third place in 53.74 s. Outside the medals, Léa Sprunger of Switzerland set a national record of 54.06 s.

== Background ==
In the 400 metres hurdles, athletes run one lap on a 400-metre athletics track while jumping over ten hurdles. The women's world championship was introduced in 1980 and contested seventeen times at the World Athletics Championships before 2019. The 2019 edition was held at the Khalifa International Stadium in Doha, Qatar, which had a capacity of 40,000 seats.

Before the competition records were as follows:

Global records before the 2019 World Athletics Championships
Record	Athlete (nation)	Time	Date	Location
World record	Dalilah Muhammad (USA)	52.20	28 July 2019	Des Moines, United States
World leading	Dalilah Muhammad (USA)	52.20	28 July 2019	Des Moines, United States
Championship record	Melaine Walker (JAM)	52.42	20 August 2009	Berlin, Germany

Area records before the 2019 World Athletics Championships
Record	Athlete (nation)	Time	Date	Location
African record	Nezha Bidouane (MAR)	52.90	25 August 1999	Sevilla, Spain
Asian record	Han Qing (CHN)	53.96	9 September 1993	Beijing, China
Asian record	Song Yinglan (CHN)	53.96	17 November 2001	Guangzhou, China
European record	Yuliya Pechonkina (RUS)	52.34	8 August 2003	Tula, Russia
North, Central American and Caribbean record	Dalilah Muhammad (USA)	52.20 WR	28 July 2019	Des Moines, United States
South American record	Gianna Woodruff (PAN)	55.60	31 July 2018	Barranquilla, Colombia
Oceanian record	Debbie Flintoff-King (AUS)	53.17	27 September 1988	Seoul, South Korea

== Qualification ==
During the qualification period from 7 September 2018 to 6 September 2019, athletes could qualify by running the entry standard of 56.00 s or faster, by winning the area championships of their continent, by wild card for the 2017 World Champion and the 2019 Diamond League champion, or by their position on the IAAF top performance list. There was a target number of forty athletes. A final entry list with forty-two athletes from twenty-seven nations was issued on 22 September 2019.

== Results ==
=== Round 1 ===
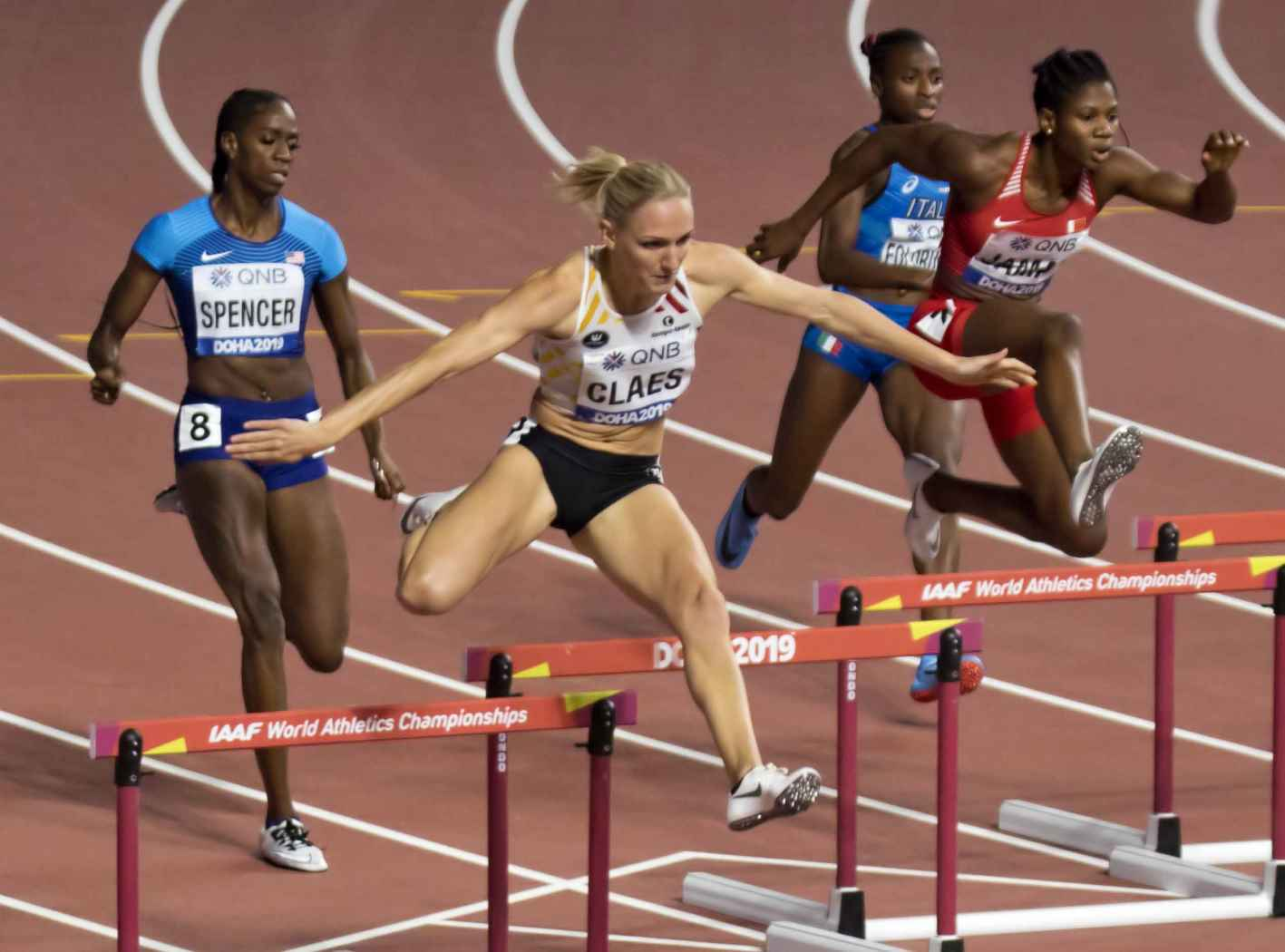
Athletes jumping over hurdles in the fourth heat of round 1

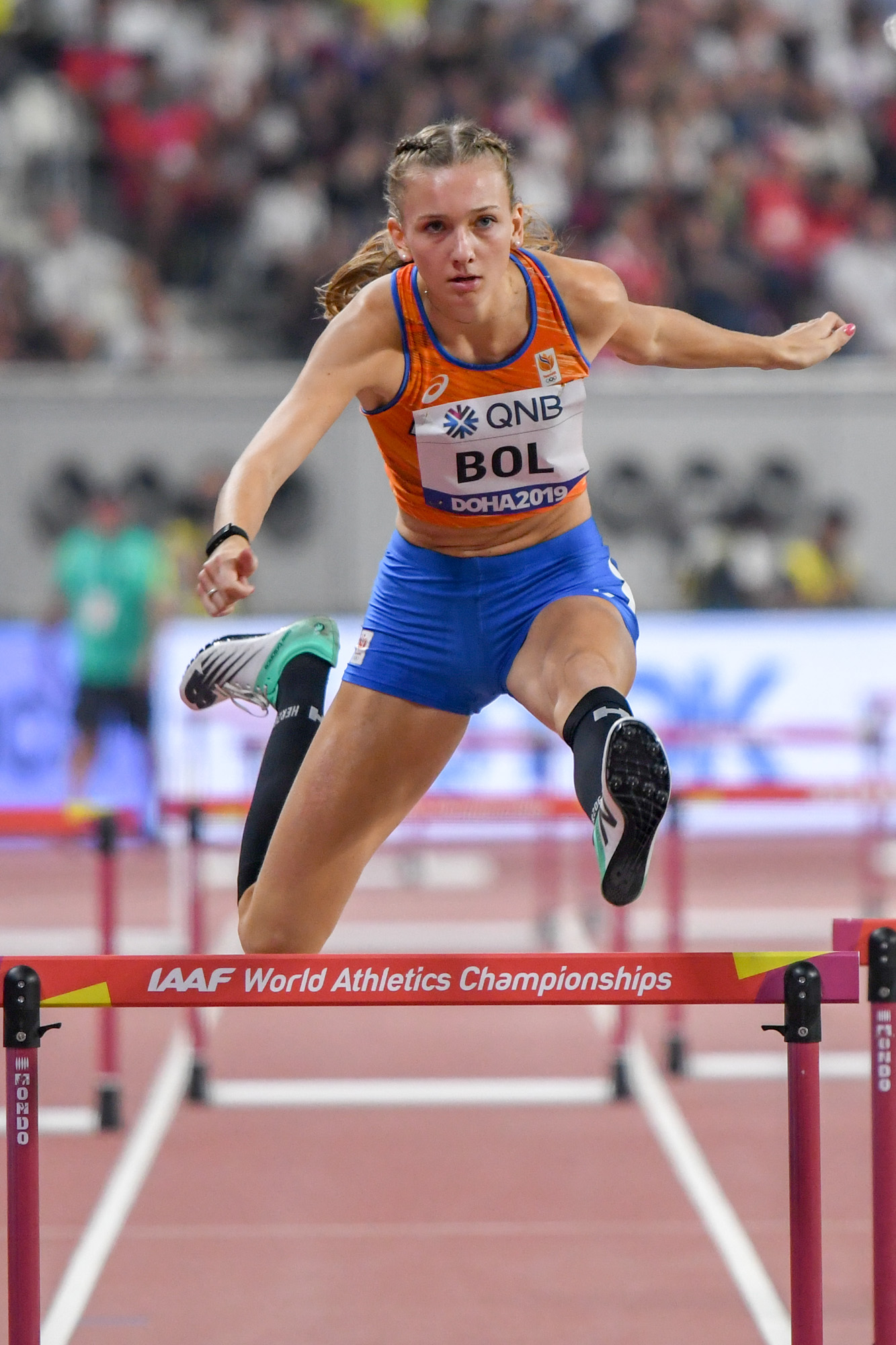
Femke Bol of the Netherlands while setting her national under-20 record in round 1

Thirty-nine athletes from twenty-seven nations competed in the five heats of the first round on 1 October in the afternoon, starting at 17:30 (UTC+3). The first four athletes in each heat (Q) and the next four fastest athletes overall (q) qualified for the semifinal. In the first heat, Shiann Salmon of Jamaica and Mariam Mamdouh Farid of Qatar ran personal bests (PB) and Portia Bing of New Zealand was disqualified (DQ) for failing to clear the height of the hurdles (168.7(a)). In the second heat, Jessica Turner of Great Britain and Northern Ireland ran a personal best and Kori Carter of the United States did not finish (DNF) the race. In the third heat, Sara Petersen of Denmark was disqualified for failing to clear the height of the hurdles. In the fourth heat, Amalie Iuel of Norway set a national record (NR) of 54.72 s, Aminat Yusuf Jamal of Bahrain ran a personal best, and 19-year-old Femke Bol of the Netherlands set a national under-20 record (NU20R) of 55.32 s.

Results of round 1
Rank	Heat	Lane	Athlete	Nation	Time	Notes
1	1	8	Sydney McLaughlin	United States	54.45	Q
2	4	5	Amalie Iuel	Norway	54.72	Q, NR
3	3	5	Dalilah Muhammad	United States	54.87	Q
4	1	4	Léa Sprunger	Switzerland	54.98	Q, SB
5	2	2	Anna Ryzhykova	Ukraine	55.11	Q
6	4	7	Aminat Yusuf Jamal	Bahrain	55.13	Q, PB
7	4	6	Ayomide Folorunso	Italy	55.20	Q
8	1	9	Shiann Salmon	Jamaica	55.20	Q, PB
9	5	7	Rushell Clayton	Jamaica	55.23	Q
10	4	8	Ashley Spencer	United States	55.28	Q
11	4	3	Femke Bol	Netherlands	55.32	q, NU20R
12	2	9	Zuzana Hejnová	Czech Republic	55.33	Q
13	3	4	Zurian Hechavarría	Cuba	55.36	Q
14	1	5	Vera Rudakova	Authorised Neutral Athletes	55.51	Q, SB
15	5	9	Sage Watson	Canada	55.57	Q
16	4	9	Hanne Claes	Belgium	55.68	q
17	2	4	Jessica Turner	Great Britain & N.I.	55.72	Q, PB
18	2	6	Yadisleidis Pedroso	Italy	55.78	Q, SB
19	2	3	Carolina Krafzik	Germany	55.93	q
20	3	7	Joanna Linkiewicz	Poland	55.97	Q
21	5	3	Meghan Beesley	Great Britain & N.I.	55.97	Q
22	1	3	Lauren Boden	Australia	56.00	q
23	3	3	Gianna Woodruff	Panama	56.07	Q
24	2	8	Ronda Whyte	Jamaica	56.37	
25	5	4	Sarah Carli	Australia	56.37	Q
26	2	5	Melissa Gonzalez	Colombia	56.49	
27	3	6	Valeriya Andreyeva	Authorised Neutral Athletes	56.79	
28	5	6	Linda Olivieri	Italy	56.82	
29	4	4	Sara Klein	Australia	56.97	
30	4	2	Yanique Haye-Smith	Turks and Caicos Islands	56.98	
31	5	8	Zenéy van der Walt	South Africa	57.11	
32	3	8	Paulien Couckuyt	Belgium	57.15	
33	1	2	Jessica Moreira	Brazil	57.37	
34	5	5	Lamiae Lhabze	Morocco	57.66	
35	5	2	Tia-Adana Belle	Barbados	58.44	
36	1	7	Mariam Mamdouh Farid	Qatar	1:09.49	PB
	2	7	Kori Carter	United States	DNF	
	3	2	Sara Petersen	Denmark	DQ	168.7(a)
	1	6	Portia Bing	New Zealand	DQ	168.7(a)

=== Semi-finals ===
Twenty-four athletes from eighteen nations competed in the three heats of the semi-finals on 2 October in the evening, starting at 21:05 (UTC+3). The first two athletes in each heat (Q) and the next two fastest athletes overall (q) qualified for the final. In the first heat, Sage Watson of Canada set a national record (NR) of 54.32 s. In the second heat, Sarah Carli of Australia ran a personal best (PB). In the third heat, Shiann Salmon of Jamaica ran a personal best as well.

Results of the semi-finals
Rank	Heat	Lane	Athlete	Nation	Time	Notes
1	3	5	Sydney McLaughlin	United States	53.81	Q
2	1	5	Dalilah Muhammad	United States	53.91	Q
3	2	7	Rushell Clayton	Jamaica	54.17	Q
4	1	4	Sage Watson	Canada	54.32	Q, NR
5	2	5	Zuzana Hejnová	Czech Republic	54.41	Q
6	2	8	Ashley Spencer	United States	54.42	q
7	1	6	Anna Ryzhykova	Ukraine	54.45	q, SB
8	3	6	Léa Sprunger	Switzerland	54.52	Q, SB
9	1	7	Zurian Hechavarría	Cuba	55.03	
10	2	4	Amalie Iuel	Norway	55.03	
11	3	7	Shiann Salmon	Jamaica	55.16	PB
12	1	3	Hanne Claes	Belgium	55.25	SB
13	2	6	Ayomide Folorunso	Italy	55.36	
14	2	9	Joanna Linkiewicz	Poland	55.38	SB
15	3	8	Yadisleidis Pedroso	Italy	55.40	SB
16	2	2	Sarah Carli	Australia	55.43	PB
17	3	4	Aminat Yusuf Jamal	Bahrain	55.54	
18	1	8	Vera Rudakova	Authorised Neutral Athletes	55.57	
19	3	2	Gianna Woodruff	Panama	55.61	SB
20	3	9	Jessica Turner	Great Britain & N.I.	55.87	
21	3	3	Lauren Boden	Australia	55.94	
22	1	2	Femke Bol	Netherlands	56.37	
23	2	3	Carolina Krafzik	Germany	56.41	
24	1	9	Meghan Beesley	Great Britain & N.I.	56.89	

=== Final ===
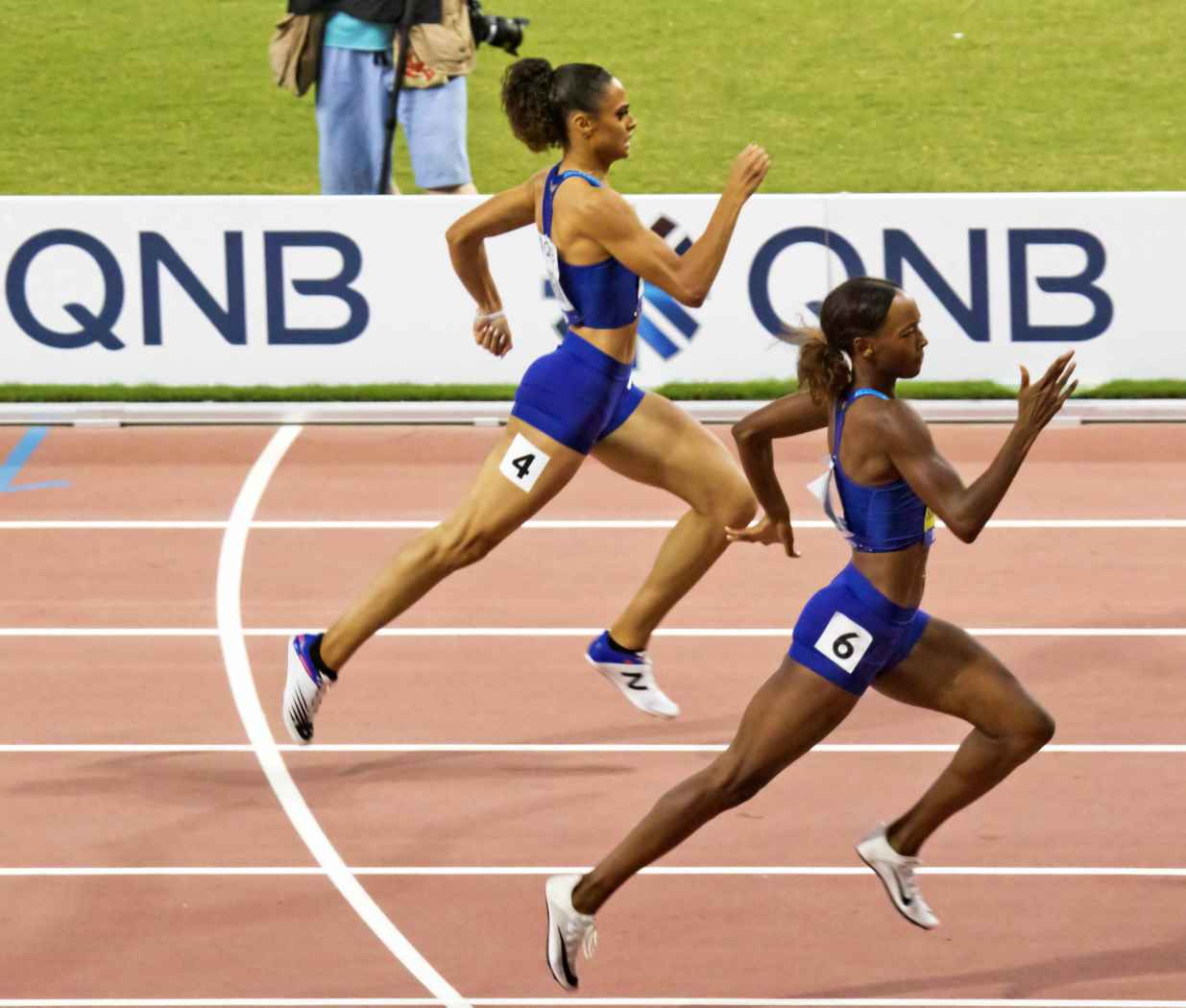
Dalilah Muhammad (right) and Sydney McLaughlin in the final

Eight athletes from six nations competed in the final on 4 October at 21:30 (UTC+3). The race was won by Dalilah Muhammad of the United States in a world record (WR) of 52.16 s, improving her own world record from earlier that year with 0.04 s. She was followed by Sydney McLaughlin in second place in a personal best time of 52.23 s and by Rushell Clayton of Jamaica in third place in a personal best time of 53.74 s. Outside the medals, Léa Sprunger of Switzerland set a national record of 54.06 s.

Results of the final
Rank	Lane	Athlete	Nation	Time	Notes
1st place, gold medalist(s)	6	Dalilah Muhammad	United States	52.16	WR
2nd place, silver medalist(s)	4	Sydney McLaughlin	United States	52.23	PB
3rd place, bronze medalist(s)	5	Rushell Clayton	Jamaica	53.74	PB
4	9	Léa Sprunger	Switzerland	54.06	NR
5	8	Zuzana Hejnová	Czech Republic	54.23	
6	2	Ashley Spencer	United States	54.45	
7	3	Anna Ryzhykova	Ukraine	54.45	SB
8	7	Sage Watson	Canada	54.82	
