= Austria at the 2022 World Athletics Championships =

- Flag of Austria
- WA code: AUT
- National federation: Austrian Athletics Federation

in Eugene, United States 15–24 July 2022
- Competitors: 4 (1 man and 3 women)
- Medals: Gold 0 Silver 0 Bronze 0 Total 0

World Athletics Championships appearances (overview)
- 1983; 1987; 1991; 1993; 1995; 1997; 1999; 2001; 2003; 2005; 2007; 2009; 2011; 2013; 2015; 2017; 2019; 2022; 2023; 2025

Austria competed at the 2022 World Athletics Championships in Eugene, United States, from 15 to 24 July 2022. Austria entered 4 athletes.

== Entrants ==
- including alternates

Track and road events

Athlete	Event	Heat		Semi-final		Final	
Athlete	Event	Result	Rank	Result	Rank	Result	Rank
Susanne Walli	Women's 400 metres	52.18 q	24	52.37	23	did not advance	

Field events

Athlete	Event	Qualification		Final	
Athlete	Event	Distance	Position	Distance	Position
Lukas Weißhaidinger	Men's discus throw	66.51 Q	6	63.98	10
Victoria Hudson	Women's javelin throw	54.05	23	did not advance	

Combined events – Heptathlon

Athlete	Event	100H	HJ	SP	200 m	LJ	JT	800 m	Final	Rank
Ivona Dadic	Result	DNS								
Ivona Dadic	Points	DNS								
