= Austria at the 2017 World Championships in Athletics =

- Flag of Austria
- WA code: AUT
- National federation: Austrian Athletics Federation
- Website: oelv.at

in London, United Kingdom 4–13 August 2017
- Competitors: 5 (3 men and 2 women) in 4 events
- Medals: Gold 0 Silver 0 Bronze 0 Total 0

World Championships in Athletics appearances
- 1983; 1987; 1991; 1993; 1995; 1997; 1999; 2001; 2003; 2005; 2007; 2009; 2011; 2013; 2015; 2017; 2019; 2022; 2023; 2025

Austria competed at the 2017 World Championships in Athletics in London, United Kingdom, 4–13 August 2017.

== Results ==
=== Men ===
Track and road events

Athlete	Event	Heat		Semifinal		Final	
Athlete	Event	Result	Rank	Result	Rank	Result	Rank
Valentin Pfeil	Marathon	—N/a				2:16:28	23

Field events

Athlete	Event	Qualification		Final	
Athlete	Event	Distance	Position	Distance	Position
Lukas Weisshaidinger	Discus throw	63.57	10 q	63.76	9

Combined events – Decathlon

Athlete	Event	100 m	LJ	SP	HJ	400 m	110H	DT	PV	JT	1500 m	Final	Rank
Dominik Distelberger	Result	11.03	7.11	12.93	1.87	48.13 SB	14.59	43.18 SB	5.00	56.46	4:39.15	7857	17
Dominik Distelberger	Points	854	840	663	687	903	900	729	910	685	686	7857	17

=== Women ===
Combined events – Heptathlon

Athlete	Event	100H	HJ	SP	200 m	LJ	JT	800 m	Final	Rank
Ivona Dadic	Result	13.68 PB	1.80	13.82	24.11	5.98	52.29 SB	2:13.44 SB	6417 NR	6
Ivona Dadic	Points	1024	978	782	970	843	905	915	6417 NR	6
Verena Preiner	Result	13.79 PB	1.71	13.16	24.44	5.98	45.27	DNS	DNF	–
Verena Preiner	Points	1008	867	738	939	843	769	0	DNF	–
