= Austria at the 2009 World Championships in Athletics =

- WA code: AUT

in Berlin
- Competitors: 4 (3 men, 1 woman)
- Medals: Gold 0 Silver 0 Bronze 0 Total 0

World Championships in Athletics appearances
- 1983; 1987; 1991; 1993; 1995; 1997; 1999; 2001; 2003; 2005; 2007; 2009; 2011; 2013; 2015; 2017; 2019; 2022; 2023; 2025

Austria fielded four competitors at the 2009 World Championships in Athletics in Berlin.

== Team selection ==
Track and road events

| Event | Athletes | |
| Event | Men | Women |
|---|---|---|
| 100 metres | Ryan Moseley | |

Field and combined events

| Event | Athletes | |
| Event | Men | Women |
|---|---|---|
| Javelin throw | | Elisabeth Pauer |
| Discus throw | Gerhard Mayer | |
| Decathlon | Roland Schwarzl | |

== Results ==
=== Men ===
Track and road events

| Event | Athletes | Heats | | Quarterfinals | | Semifinal | | Final | |
| Event | Athletes | Result | Rank | Result | Rank | Result | Rank | Result | Rank |
|---|---|---|---|---|---|---|---|---|---|
| 100 m | Ryan Moseley | 10.58 | 58 | did not advance | | | | | |

Field and combined events

| Event | Athletes | Qualification | | Final | |
| Event | Athletes | Result | Rank | Result | Rank |
|---|---|---|---|---|---|
| Discus throw | Gerhard Mayer | 62.53 | 11 | 63.17 | 8 |
| Decathlon | Roland Schwarzl | | | DNF | - |

=== Women ===
Field and combined events

| Event | Athletes | Qualification | | Final | |
| Event | Athletes | Result | Rank | Result | Rank |
|---|---|---|---|---|---|
| Javelin throw | Elisabeth Pauer | 50.88 | 30 | did not advance | |
