= Ronda Whyte =

Jamaican hurdler

Personal information
- Nationality: Jamaican
- Born: 6 November 1990 (age 35)

Sport
- Country: Jamaica
- Sport: Athletics
- Event: 400 metres hurdles

Achievements and titles
- Personal best: 400m hurdles: 54.29 (2017)
Medal record
Central American and Caribbean Games
Gold medal – first place	2018 Barranquilla	400 m hurdles

Ronda Whyte (born 6 November 1990) is a Jamaican track and field athlete who specializes in the 400 metres hurdles. She represented Jamaica at the 2019 World Athletics Championships, competing in women's 400 metres hurdles.

She has qualified to represent Jamaica at the 2020 Summer Olympics.
