= France at the 2019 World Athletics Championships =

- WA code: FRA

in Doha, Qatar
- Competitors: 53 (32 men and 21 women) in 31 events
- Medals Ranked 24th: Gold 0 Silver 1 Bronze 1 Total 2

World Athletics Championships appearances (overview)
- 1976; 1980; 1983; 1987; 1991; 1993; 1995; 1997; 1999; 2001; 2003; 2005; 2007; 2009; 2011; 2013; 2015; 2017; 2019; 2022; 2023

France competed at the 2019 World Athletics Championships in Doha, Qatar from 27 September to 6 October 2019. The country finished in 24th place in the medal table.

== Medalists ==
Medal	Athlete	Event	Date
Silver	Quentin Bigot	Men's hammer throw	October 2
Bronze	Pascal Martinot-Lagarde	Men's 110 metres hurdles	October 2

== Results ==
(q – qualified, NM – no mark, SB – season best)

=== Men ===
Track and road events

Athlete	Event	Heat		Semifinal		Final	
Athlete	Event	Result	Rank	Result	Rank	Result	Rank
Jimmy Vicaut	100 m	10.08	6 Q	10.16	16	did not advance	
Mouhamadou Fall	200 m	20.63	32	did not advance			
Pierre-Ambroise Bosse	800 m	1:46.14	18 Q	1:47.60	22	did not advance	
Alexis Miellet	1500 m	3:37.69	17 Q	3:37.39	17	did not advance	
Rabil Doukkana	1500 m	did not start		did not advance			
Djilali Bedrani	3000 m steeplechase	8:13.02	2 Q	8:05.23 PB	15	did not advance	
Yoann Kowal	3000 m steeplechase	8:37.90	37	did not advance			
Pascal Martinot-Lagarde	110 m hurdles	13.45	12 Q	13.12 SB	3 Q	13.18	3rd place, bronze medalist(s)
Dimitri Bascou	110 m hurdles	13.53	19 q	13.48	10	did not advance	
Wilhem Belocian	110 m hurdles	13.67	25 Q	13.60	19	did not advance	
Ludvy Vaillant	400 m hurdles	49.49	6 Q	49.10	12	did not advance	
Wilfried Happio	400 m hurdles	51.25	33	did not advance			
Amaury Golitin; Jimmy Vicaut; Méba-Mickaël Zeze; Christophe Lemaitre; Mouhamadou Fall*	4 × 100 m relay	37.88 SB	5 q	—		did not finish	
Ludvy Vaillant; Christopher Naliali; Thomas Jordier; Mame-Ibra Anne	4 × 400 m relay	3:01.40 SB	6 q	—		3:03.06	7
Kévin Campion	20 km walk	—				1:32:16	16
Gabriel Bordier	20 km walk	—				1:34:06	24
Yohann Diniz	50 km walk	—				did not finish	

Field events

Athlete	Event	Qualification		Final	
Athlete	Event	Result	Rank	Result	Rank
Valentin Lavillenie	Pole vault	5.70	9 q	5.70	6
Renaud Lavillenie	Pole vault	5.60	15	did not advance	
Alioune Sene	Pole vault	5.45	26	did not advance	
Benjamin Compaoré	Triple jump	16.59	22	did not advance	
Jean-Marc Pontvianne	Triple jump	16.31	26	did not advance	
Quentin Bigot	Hammer throw	77.44	3 Q	78.19 SB	2nd place, silver medalist(s)

Combined events – Decathlon

Athlete	Event	100 m	LJ	SP	HJ	400 m	110H	DT	PV	JT	1500 m	Final	Rank
Kevin Mayer	Result	10.50 PB	7.56 SB	16.82 PB	1.99 SB	48.99 SB	13.87	48.34	NM	DNS		did not finish	
Kevin Mayer	Points	975	950	902	794	862	991	836	0	DNS		did not finish	
Basile Rolnin	Result	11.42	did not start									did not finish	
Basile Rolnin	Points	769	did not start									did not finish	

=== Women ===
Track and road events

Athlete	Event	Heat		Semifinal		Final	
Athlete	Event	Result	Rank	Result	Rank	Result	Rank
Orlann Ombissa-Dzangue	100 m	11.34	27	did not advance			
Carolle Zahi	200 m	22.99	18 Q	23.03	16	did not advance	
Déborah Sananes	400 m	51.76	18 Q	52.24	19	did not advance	
Amandine Brossier	400 m	52.81	41	did not advance			
Rénelle Lamote	800 m	2:03.36	24 Q	2:02.86	20	did not advance	
Ophélie Claude-Boxberger	3000 m steeplechase	10:05.10	41	—		did not advance	
Laura Valette	100 m hurdles	13.47	32	did not advance			
Fanny Quenot	100 m hurdles	13.51	34	did not advance			
Solène Ndama	100 m hurdles	did not finish		did not advance			
Carolle Zahi; Cynthia Leduc; Estelle Raffai; Orlann Ombissa-Dzangue	4 × 100 m relay	DQ		—		did not advance	
Amandine Brossier; Déborah Sananes; Élise Trynkler; Agnès Raharolahy	4 × 400 m relay	3:29.66 SB	12	—		did not advance	

Field events

Athlete	Event	Qualification		Final	
Athlete	Event	Result	Rank	Result	Rank
Ninon Guillon-Romarin	Pole vault	4.60	16 Q	4.70	12
Hilary Kpatcha	Long jump	6.47	18	did not advance	
Éloyse Lesueur-Aymonin	Long jump	6.46	21	did not advance	
Yanis David	Long jump	6.46	29	did not advance	
Yanis David	Triple jump	did not start		did not advance	
Rouguy Diallo	Triple jump	14.25	7 q	14.08	10
Mélina Robert-Michon	Discus throw	64.02 SB	4 Q	59.99	10
Alexandra Tavernier	Hammer throw	72.91	6 Q	73.33	6
Alexie Alaïs	Javelin throw	60.46	14	did not advance	

Combined events – Heptathlon

Athlete	Event	100H	HJ	SP	200 m	LJ	JT	800 m	Final	Rank
Solène Ndama	Result	12.90	1.71	13.68	24.34	5.98	37.62 PB	2:18.75	6034	14
Solène Ndama	Points	1140	867	773	948	843	622	841	6034	14

=== Mixed ===
Track and road events

Athlete	Event	Heat		Semifinal		Final	
Athlete	Event	Result	Rank	Result	Rank	Result	Rank
Mame-Ibra Anne; Amandine Brossier; Agnès Raharolahy; Thomas Jordier	4 × 400 m relay	3:17.17 NR	12	—		did not advance	
