= Austria at the 2013 World Championships in Athletics =

- WA code: AUT

in Moscow
- Competitors: 2
- Medals: Gold 0 Silver 0 Bronze 0 Total 0

World Championships in Athletics appearances
- 1983; 1987; 1991; 1993; 1995; 1997; 1999; 2001; 2003; 2005; 2007; 2009; 2011; 2013; 2015; 2017; 2019; 2022; 2023

Austria competed at the 2013 World Championships in Athletics from August 10 to August 18 in Moscow, Russia. A team of 2 athletes was announced to represent the country in the event.

== Results ==
(q – qualified, NM – no mark, SB – season best)

=== Men ===
Athlete	Event	Preliminaries		Final	
Athlete	Event	Time/Mark	Rank	Time/Mark	Rank
Andreas Vojta	1500 metres	3:41.51	28	did not advance	
Gerhard Mayer	Discus throw	59.85	18	did not advance	
