= Austria at the 2019 World Athletics Championships =

Austria at the 2019 World Championships in Athletics
- WA code: AUT

in Doha, Qatar 27 September 2019 – 6 October 2019
- Competitors: 6 (2 men and 4 women) in 5 events
- Medals Ranked 30th: Gold 0 Silver 0 Bronze 2 Total 2

World Championships in Athletics appearances
- 1983; 1987; 1991; 1993; 1995; 1997; 1999; 2001; 2003; 2005; 2007; 2009; 2011; 2013; 2015; 2017; 2019; 2022; 2023

Austria competed at the 2019 World Athletics Championships in Doha, Qatar, from 27 September to 6 October 2019. Austria was represented by four athletes.

== Medalists ==
| Medal | Athlete | Event | Date |
|---|---|---|---|
| Bronze | Lukas Weißhaidinger | Men's discus throw | September 30 |
| Bronze | Verena Preiner | Women's heptathlon | October 3 |

== Results ==
=== Men ===
Track and road events

| Athlete | Event | Heat | | Semifinal | | Final | |
| Athlete | Event | Result | Rank | Result | Rank | Result | Rank |
|---|---|---|---|---|---|---|---|
| Lemawork Ketema | Marathon | — | | | | 2:20:45 | 41 |

Field events

| Athlete | Event | Qualification | | Final | |
| Athlete | Event | Result | Rank | Result | Rank |
|---|---|---|---|---|---|
| Lukas Weißhaidinger | Discus throw | 63.31 | 12 q | 66.82 | 3rd place, bronze medalist(s) |

=== Women ===
Track and road events

| Athlete | Event | Heat | | Semifinal | | Final | |
| Athlete | Event | Result | Rank | Result | Rank | Result | Rank |
|---|---|---|---|---|---|---|---|
| Beate Schrott | 100 m hurdles | 13.08 | 22 q | 13.25 | 22 | did not advance | |

Field events

| Athlete | Event | Qualification | | Final | |
| Athlete | Event | Result | Rank | Result | Rank |
|---|---|---|---|---|---|
| Victoria Hudson | Javelin throw | 52.51 | 31 | did not advance | |

Combined events – Heptathlon

| Athlete | Event | 100H | HJ | SP | 200 m | LJ | JT | 800 m | Final | Rank |
|---|---|---|---|---|---|---|---|---|---|---|
| Ivona Dadic | Result | DQ | did not start | | | | | | did not finish | |
| Ivona Dadic | Points | 0 | did not start | | | | | | did not finish | |
| Verena Preiner | Result | 13.25 PB | 1.77 | 14.21 | 23.96 PB | 6.36 PB | 46.68 | 2:08.88 | 6560 | 3rd place, bronze medalist(s) |
| Verena Preiner | Points | 1087 | 941 | 808 | 985 | 962 | 796 | 981 | 6560 | 3rd place, bronze medalist(s) |
