= Austria at the 2015 World Championships in Athletics =

- WA code: AUT

in Beijing
- Competitors: 5
- Medals: Gold 0 Silver 0 Bronze 0 Total 0

World Championships in Athletics appearances
- 1983; 1987; 1991; 1993; 1995; 1997; 1999; 2001; 2003; 2005; 2007; 2009; 2011; 2013; 2015; 2017; 2019; 2022; 2023

Austria competed at the 2015 World Championships in Athletics in Beijing, China, from 22 to 30 August 2015.

== Results ==
(q – qualified, NM – no mark, SB – season best)

=== Men ===
Track and road events

Athlete	Event	Heat		Semifinal		Final	
Athlete	Event	Result	Rank	Result	Rank	Result	Rank
Edwin Kipchirchir Kemboi	Marathon	—				2:28:06	32

Field events

Athlete	Event	Qualification		Final	
Athlete	Event	Distance	Position	Distance	Position
Gerhard Mayer	Discus throw	57.73	30	Did not advance	
Lukas Weißhaidinger	Discus throw	61.26	20	Did not advance	

=== Women ===
Track and road events

Athlete	Event	Heat		Semifinal		Final	
Athlete	Event	Result	Rank	Result	Rank	Result	Rank
Jennifer Wenth	5000 metres	15:43.57	7 q	—		15:35.46	15
Beate Schrott	100 metres hurdles	13.04	5 q	DNF	–	Did not advance	
