= Austria at the 2011 World Championships in Athletics =

- WA code: AUT
- National federation: Österreichischer Leichtathletik-Verband
- Website: www.oelv.at

in Daegu
- Competitors: 4
- Medals: Gold 0 Silver 0 Bronze 0 Total 0

World Championships in Athletics appearances
- 1983; 1987; 1991; 1993; 1995; 1997; 1999; 2001; 2003; 2005; 2007; 2009; 2011; 2013; 2015; 2017; 2019; 2022; 2023

Austria competed at the 2011 World Championships in Athletics from August 27 to September 4 in Daegu, South Korea. A team of 3 athletes was announced initially to represent the country in the event. Recently, javelin thrower Elisabeth Eberl fulfilled the entry standards for Daegu, and was nominated as 4th athlete.

== Results ==
=== Men ===
Athlete	Event	Preliminaries		Heats		Semifinals		Final	
Athlete	Event	Time Width Height	Rank	Time Width Height	Rank	Time Width Height	Rank	Time Width Height	Rank
Andreas Vojta	1500 metres			3:41.34	22	Did not advance			
Gerhard Mayer	Discus throw	61.47	21					Did not advance	

=== Women ===
Athlete	Event	Preliminaries		Heats		Semifinals		Final	
Athlete	Event	Time Width Height	Rank	Time Width Height	Rank	Time Width Height	Rank	Time Width Height	Rank
Beate Schrott	100 m hurdles			13.25	24 Q	13.02	18	Did not advance	
Elisabeth Eberl	Javelin throw	56.48	25					Did not advance	
