= Japan at the 2019 World Athletics Championships =

- Flag of Japan
- WA code: JPN
- National federation: Japan Association of Athletics Federations
- Website: https://www.jaaf.or.jp/english/

in Doha, Qatar
- Medals Ranked 8th: Gold 2 Silver 0 Bronze 1 Total 3

World Athletics Championships appearances
- 1983; 1987; 1991; 1993; 1995; 1997; 1999; 2001; 2003; 2005; 2007; 2009; 2011; 2013; 2015; 2017; 2019; 2022; 2023

Japan competed at the 2019 World Championships in Athletics in Doha, Qatar from 27 September to 6 October 2019. The country finished in 8th place in the medal table.

== Medalists ==
Medal	Athlete	Event	Date
Gold	Toshikazu Yamanishi	Men's 20 kilometres walk	October 4
Gold	Yusuke Suzuki	Men's 50 kilometres walk	September 28
Bronze	Shuhei Tada; Kirara Shiraishi; Yoshihide Kiryū; Abdul Hakim Sani Brown; Yuki Koike*	Men's 4 × 100 metres relay	September 5

== Results ==
Key

- Note–Ranks given for track events are within the athlete's heat only
- Q = Qualified for the next round
- q = Qualified for the next round as a fastest loser or, in field events, by position without achieving the qualifying target
- NR = National record
- N/A = Round not applicable for the event
- Bye = Athlete not required to compete in round

=== Men ===
==== Track & road ====
Athlete	Event	Heat		Quarterfinal		Semifinal		Final	
Athlete	Event	Result	Rank	Result	Rank	Result	Rank	Result	Rank
Yoshihide Kiryū	100 m	Bye		10.18	4 q	10.16	6	did not advance	
Yuki Koike	100 m	Bye		10.21	4 q	10.28	7	did not advance	
Abdul Hakim Sani Brown	100 m	Bye		10.09	3 Q	10.15	5	did not advance	
Yuki Koike	200 m	20.46	4	—		did not advance			
Jun Yamashita	200 m	20.62	5	—		did not advance			
Kirara Shiraishi	200 m	20.62	5	—		did not advance			
Julian Walsh	400 m	45.14 PB	2 Q	—		45.13 PB	4	did not advance	
Shunsuke Izumiya	110 m hurdles	DNS		—		did not advance			
Taio Kanai	110 m hurdles	13.74	7	—		did not advance			
Shunya Takayama	110 m hurdles	13.32	2 Q	—		13.58	6	did not advance	
Takatoshi Abe	400 m hurdles	49.25	2 Q	48.97	3	—		did not advance	
Taio Kanai	400 m hurdles	50.34	5 q	50.30	8	—		did not advance	
Kirara Shiraishi; Yoshihide Kiryu; Yuki Koike; Shuhei Tada; Abdul Hakim Sani Brown	4 × 100 m relay	37.78 SB	2 Q	—				37.43 AR	3rd place, bronze medalist(s)
Julian Walsh; Shota Iizuka; Kentaro Sato; Kota Wakabayashi	4 × 400 m relay	3:02.05 SB	5	—				did not advance	
Hiroki Yamagishi	Marathon	—						2:16.43 SB	25
Yuki Kawauchi	Marathon	—						2:17.59	29
Kohei Futaoka	Marathon	—						2:19.23	37
Koki Ikeda	20 km walk	—						1:29.02	6
Toshikazu Yamanishi	20 km walk	—						1:26.34	1st place, gold medalist(s)
Eiki Takahashi	20 km walk	—						1:30.04	10
Yusuke Suzuki	50 km walk	—						4:04.20	1st place, gold medalist(s)
Hayato Katsuki	50 km walk	—						4:46.10	27
Tomohiro Noda	50 km walk	—						DNF	

==== Field ====
Athlete	Event	Qualification		Final	
Athlete	Event	Distance	Position	Distance	Position
Naoto Tobe	High jump	2.26	14	did not advance	
Ryo Sato	High jump	2.22	22	did not advance	
Takashi Eto	High jump	2.17	=25	did not advance	
Seito Yamamoto	Pole vault	5.60	20	did not advance	
Daichi Sawano	Pole vault	5.45	27	did not advance	
Masaki Ejima	Pole vault	5.47	28	did not advance	
Yuki Hashioka	Long Jump	8.07	3 q	7.97	8
Shotaro Shiroyama	Long Jump	7.94	8 q	7.77	11
Hibiki Tsuha	Long Jump	7.72	18	did not advance	
Ryohei Arai	Javelin throw	81.71	15	did not advance	

==== Combined - Decathlon ====
Athlete	Event	100 m	LJ	SP	HJ	400 m	110H	DT	PV	JT	1500 m	Final	Rank
Keisuke Ushiro	Result	11.44	6.90	14.31	1.90	51.42 SB	15.26	48.41 SB	4.40 SB	61.36	4:52.12	7545	16
Keisuke Ushiro	Points	765	790	747	714	750	818	837	731	758	606	7545	16

=== Women ===
==== Track & road ====
Athlete	Event	Heat		Semifinal		Final	
Athlete	Event	Result	Rank	Result	Rank	Result	Rank
Nozomi Tanaka	5000 m	15:04.66 PB	12 q	—		15:00.01 PB	14
Tomoka Kimura	5000 m	15:53.08	24	—		did not advance	
Hitomi Niiya	10,000 m	—				31:12.99 SB	11
Minami Yamanouchi	10,000 m	—				32:53.46	19
Mizuki Tanimoto	Marathon	—				2:39:09	7
Madoka Nakano	Marathon	—				2:42:39	11
Ayano Ikemitsu	Marathon	—				did not finish	
Reimi Yoshimura	3000 m steeplechase	9:55.72	39	—		did not advance	
Ayako Kimura	100 m hurdles	13.19	28	did not advance			
Asuka Terada	100 m hurdles	13.20	29	did not advance			
Kumiko Okada	20 km walk	—				1:34:36	6
Nanako Fujii	20 km walk	—				1:34:50	7
Masumi Fuchise	50 km walk	—				4:41:02	11

==== Field ====
Athlete	Event	Qualification		Final	
Athlete	Event	Distance	Position	Distance	Position
Nanaka Kori	Discus throw	48.82	29	did not advance	
Haruka Kitaguchi	Javelin throw	60.84	13	did not advance	
Yuka Sato	Javelin throw	55.03	29	did not advance	

=== Mixed ===
==== Track & road ====
Athlete	Event	Heat		Semifinal		Final	
Athlete	Event	Result	Rank	Result	Rank	Result	Rank
Seika Aoyama; Kota Wakabayashi; Tomoya Tamura; Saki Takashima	4 × 400 m relay	3:18.77 NR	16	—		did not advance	
