= North Korea at the 2019 World Athletics Championships =

- WA code: PRK

in Doha, Qatar 27 September 2019 – 6 October 2019
- Competitors: 3 in 1 event
- Medals: Gold 0 Silver 0 Bronze 0 Total 0

World Athletics Championships appearances
- 1983; 1987–1997; 1999; 2001; 2003; 2005; 2007; 2009; 2011; 2013; 2015; 2017; 2019; 2022; 2023

North Korea competed at the 2019 World Athletics Championships in Doha, Qatar, from 27 September to 6 October 2019.

== Results ==
Key

- Q = Qualified for the next round
- q = Qualified for the next round as a fastest loser or, in field events, by position without achieving the qualifying target
- NR = National record
- PB = Personal best
- SB = Season best
- N/A = Round not applicable for the event

=== Women ===
Track and road events

Athlete	Event	Final	
Athlete	Event	Result	Rank
Jo Un-ok	Marathon	2:42:23	10
Ri Kwang-ok	Marathon	2:46:16	14
Kim Ji-hyang	Marathon	2:41:24	8
