= Rutendo =

Rutendo is a Shona given name meaning "faith". Although it is a unisex name, the name is predominantly given to females. It may refer to:

- Rutendo Makore (born 1992), Zimbabwean association football player
- Rutendo Nyahora (born 1988), Zimbabwean Olympic marathon runner
