= Monika Bytautienė =

Lithuanian long-distance runner (born 1989)

Personal information
- Nationality: Lithuanian
- Born: 17 March 1989 (age 36)

Sport
- Sport: Athletics
- Event: Marathon

Monika Bytautienė (born 17 March 1989) is a Lithuanian athlete. She competed in the women's marathon event at the 2019 World Athletics Championships. In 2020, she competed in the women's race at the 2020 World Athletics Half Marathon Championships held in Gdynia, Poland.
