= Mariya Korobitskaya =

Kyrgyzstani long-distance runner

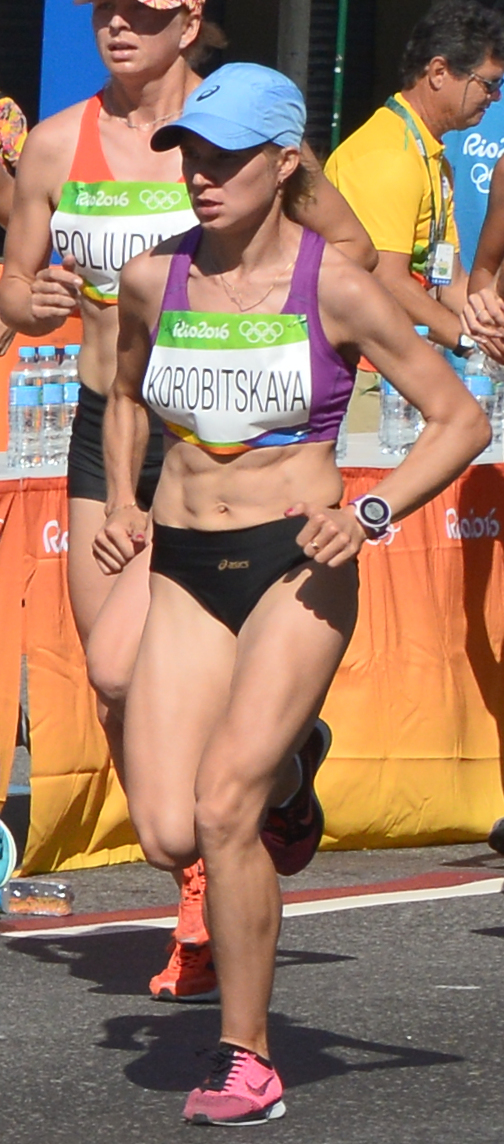
- Mariya Korobitskaya at the 2016 Summer Olympics

Personal information
- Born: 10 May 1990 (age 36) Frunze, Kirghiz SSR, Soviet Union

Sport
- Sport: Track and field
- Event: Marathon

Mariya Korobitskaya (born 10 May 1990) is a Kyrgyzstani long-distance runner who specialises in the marathon. She competed in the women's marathon event at the 2016 Summer Olympics held in Rio de Janeiro, Brazil. In 2019, she competed in the women's marathon at the 2019 World Athletics Championships held in Doha, Qatar. However, she did not finish but dropped out of the race.

She set her marathon P.R. on 20 October 2019 in Amsterdam of 2:30:40.
