= Rochelle Rodgers =

Australian long-distance runner

Personal information
- Nationality: Australian
- Born: 15 April 1987 (age 38)

Sport
- Sport: Athletics
- Event: Marathon

Rochelle Rodgers (born 15 April 1987) is an Australian athlete. She competed in the women's marathon event at the 2019 World Athletics Championships.
