= Sweden at the 2019 World Athletics Championships =

Sweden at the 2019 World Championships in Athletics
- WA code: SWE
- National federation: Svenska Friidrottsförbundet
- Website: www.friidrott.se

in Doha, Qatar
- Competitors: 24
- Medals Ranked =10th: Gold 1 Silver 1 Bronze 1 Total 3

World Championships in Athletics appearances (overview)
- 1976; 1980; 1983; 1987; 1991; 1993; 1995; 1997; 1999; 2001; 2003; 2005; 2007; 2009; 2011; 2013; 2015; 2017; 2019; 2022; 2023

Sweden competed at the 2019 World Championships in Athletics in Doha, Qatar, from 27 October to 4 October 2019. 24 athletes were selected to compete for Sweden.

== Medalists ==
Medal	Name	Event	Date
Gold	Daniel Ståhl	Men's discus throw	30 September
Silver	Armand Duplantis	Men’s pole vault	1 October
Bronze	Perseus Karlström	Men's 20 kilometres walk	1 October

== Results ==
=== Men ===
Track and road events

Athlete	Event	Heat		Semifinal		Final	
Athlete	Event	Result	Rank	Result	Rank	Result	Rank
Andreas Kramer	800 m	1:46.74	28	did not advance			
Kalle Berglund	1500 m	3:36.19	3 Q	3:36.72	9 Q	3:33.70 NR, PB	9
Adhanom Abraha	Marathon	—				2:17:57	28
Perseus Karlström	20 km walk	—				1:27:00	3rd place, bronze medalist(s)
Anatole Ibáñez	50 km walk	—				4:17:04	12

Field events

Athlete	Event	Qualification		Final	
Athlete	Event	Distance	Position	Distance	Position
Armand Duplantis	Pole vault	5.75	7 Q	5.97	2nd place, silver medalist(s)
Melker Svärd Jakobsson	Pole vault	did not start		did not advance	
Thobias Montler	Long jump	7.92	9 q	7.96	9
Wiktor Petersson	Shot put	20.31	19	did not advance	
Simon Pettersson	Discus throw	63.64	10 q	63.72	9
Daniel Ståhl	Discus throw	67.88	1 Q	67.59	1st place, gold medalist(s)
Kim Amb	Javelin throw	84.85	4 Q	80.42	8

Combined events – Decathlon

Athlete	Event	100 m	LJ	SP	HJ	400 m	110H	DT	PV	JT	1500 m	Final	Rank
Fredrik Samuelsson	Result	11.13	7.11	13.97	2.02	50.08	14.78	42.71	4.80	57.39	4:39.48	7860	15
Fredrik Samuelsson	Points	832	840	727	822	811	876	720	849	699	684	7860	15

=== Women ===
Track and road events

Athlete	Event	Heat		Semifinal		Final	
Athlete	Event	Result	Rank	Result	Rank	Result	Rank
Lovisa Lindh	800 m	2:03.72	33	did not advance			
Yolanda Ngarambe	1500 m	4:09.22	27 Q	4:03.43 PB	9	did not advance	
Johanna Bäcklund	Marathon	—				3:08:30	37
Charlotta Fougberg	Marathon	—				2:49:17	18
Cecilia Norrbom	Marathon	—				did not finish	

Field events

Athlete	Event	Qualification		Final	
Athlete	Event	Distance	Position	Distance	Position
Erika Kinsey	High jump	1.85	=18	did not advance	
Angelica Bengtsson	Pole vault	4.60	15 Q	4.80 NR	6
Michaela Meijer	Pole vault	4.35	=25	did not advance	
Tilde Johansson	Long jump	6.48	17	did not advance	
Fanny Roos	Shot put	18.01	14	did not advance	
Vanessa Kamga	Discus throw	55.87	24	did not advance	
