= Melanie Myrand =

Canadian long-distance runner

Personal information
- Nationality: Canadian
- Born: 7 October 1985 (age 40)

Sport
- Sport: Athletics
- Event: Marathon

Melanie Myrand (born 7 October 1985) is a Canadian athlete. She competed in the women's marathon event at the 2019 World Athletics Championships.

== Career ==
Myrand started road racing in 2014. She participated in a 5 km (17:44) and in the Montreal Marathon where she did 3:04 to finish in 3rd place. She then specialized on the track to make a comeback on the road in 2017. She did two half-marathons; in Calgary she finished in 1 h 19 min 49 s and took 3rd place, and in Philadelphia, she beat her personal best with a time of 1 h 17. After that, she participated in her second marathon, the Scotiabank Toronto Marathon. She achieved a time of 2 h 39 min 10 s, removing 23 min from her personal best.

In 2018, she beat her half-marathon personal best in Houston with a time of 1 h 15 min, and beat her marathon record in Chicago with a time of 2 h 34 min 08 s. In 2019, she failed to break her half-marathon record at the Canadian Championships, but broke her marathon record with a time of 2 h 33 min 20 s in Rotterdam. She participated in the World Marathon Championships in 2019. She ran a 10k personal best on the track, in 2020, running 33 minutes and 42 seconds.

== Personal Best ==
Best Times
Discipline	Performance	Venue	Date
10,000 meters	33 mins 42 s 66	Quebec, Canada	21 August 2020
Half-Marathon	1 h 15 mins 17 s	Rotterdam, Netherlands	7 April 2019
Marathon	2 h 33 mins 20 s	Rotterdam, Netherlands	7 April 2019
