= Rose Chelimo =

Bahraini long-distance runner

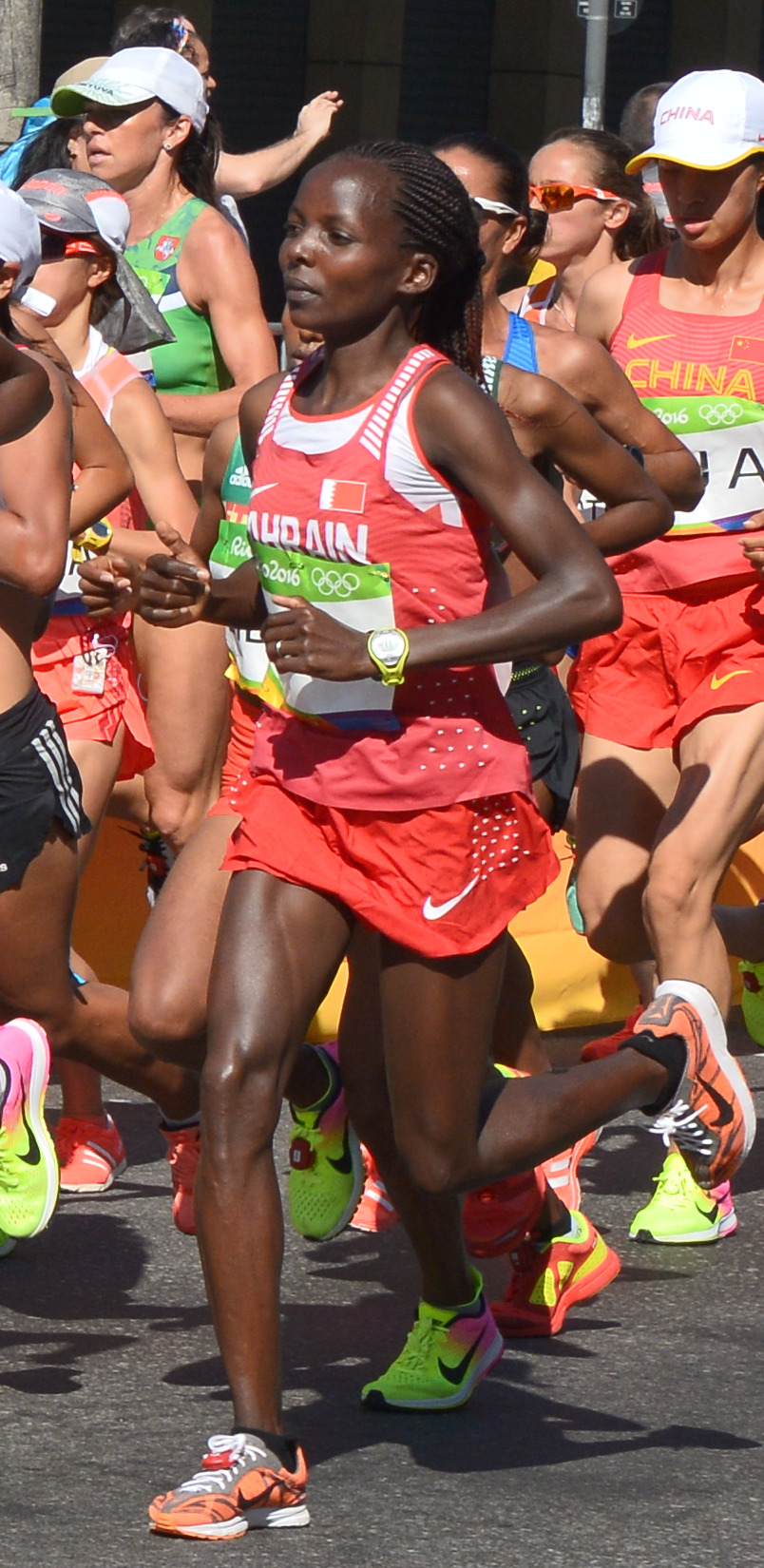
- Chelimo at the 2016 Olympics

Personal information
- Nationality: Bahraini
- Born: 12 July 1989 (age 37)

Sport
- Country: Bahrain
- Sport: Athletics
- Events: Half marathon, Marathon

Achievements and titles
- Personal bests: 10 km – 32:04 (2011); Half marathon – 68:08 (2016); Marathon – 2:22:51 (2017)
Medal record
World Championships
Gold medal – first place	2017 London	Marathon
Silver medal – second place	2019 Doha	Marathon
Asian Games
Gold medal – first place	2018 Jakarta	Marathon

Rose Chelimo (born 12 July 1989) is a Kenyan-born Bahraini long-distance runner who competes in road running events up to the marathon distance. She is the 2017 IAAF world champion. She represented Bahrain at the 2016 Summer Olympics, placing eighth in the women's marathon.

Chelimo started competing in professional European road races in 2010. In France that year she was runner-up at the Paris-Versailles and won the 20K de Paris and Grand Nancy Half Marathon. The following year she won the Lac d'Annecy Half Marathon. A career breakthrough of 69:45 minutes for the half marathon came in a runner-up finish in Lille. She also won the Auray-Vannes Half Marathon and was top three at the Paris 20K and Reims Half Marathon.

In 2012, she began competing a higher profile races, but did not place as highly, though she was second at the Zwolle Half Marathon. She missed the 2013 season but returned in mid-2014 with a string of victories, including the Alsterlauf, Bredase Singelloop (in a best of 68:40 minutes) and the Paris 20K. She continued this into 2015 by winning the Adana Half Marathon, San Blas Half Marathon and the Lisbon Half Marathon, winning the latter in a new best of 68:22 minutes. After a win at the České Budějovice Half Marathon, she gained Bahraini citizenship and began competing for that country.

Chelimo started 2016 with two personal bests. She ran 68:08 minutes for eighth at the RAK Half Marathon, then won her debut race at the Seoul International Marathon, crossing the line in 2:24:14 hours. In her Olympic debut at the 2016 Rio Games she had an eighth-place finish in 2:27:36 hours, while her teammate Eunice Kirwa took the silver.

== International competitions ==
Year	Competition	Venue	Position	Event	Notes
2016	Olympic Games	Rio de Janeiro, Brazil	8th	Marathon	2:27:36
2017	World Championships	London, UK	1st	Marathon	2:27:11
2018	Asian Games	Jakarta, Indonesia	1st	Marathon	2:34:51
2019	World Championships	Doha, Qatar	2nd	Marathon	2:33.46
2023	World Championships	Budapest, Hungary	–	Marathon	DNF
