= Ayano Ikemitsu =

Japanese long-distance runner

Personal information
- Nationality: Japanese
- Born: 18 April 1991 (age 34)

Sport
- Sport: Athletics
- Event: Marathon

Ayano Ikemitsu (池満 綾乃, Ikemitsu Ayano; born 18 April 1991) is a Japanese athlete. She competed in the women's marathon event at the 2019 World Athletics Championships.
