= Uganda at the 2019 World Athletics Championships =

- WA code: UGA

in Doha, Qatar
- Competitors: 21 (11 men and 10 women) in 12 events
- Medals Ranked 9th: Gold 2 Silver 0 Bronze 0 Total 2

World Athletics Championships appearances
- 1983; 1987; 1991; 1993; 1995; 1997; 1999; 2001; 2003; 2005; 2007; 2009; 2011; 2013; 2015; 2017; 2019; 2022; 2023; 2025

Uganda competed at the 2019 World Athletics Championships in Doha, Qatar from 27 September to 6 October 2019. The country finished in 9th place in the medal table.

== Medalists ==
Medal	Athlete	Event	Date
Gold	Joshua Cheptegei	Men's 10,000 metres	October 6
Gold	Halimah Nakaayi	Women's 800 metres	September 30

== Results ==
(q – qualified, NM – no mark, SB – season best)

=== Men ===
Track and road events

Athlete	Event	Heat		Semifinal		Final	
Athlete	Event	Result	Rank	Result	Rank	Result	Rank
Ronald Musagala	1500 m	3:36.54	6 Q	3:37.19	16	did not advance	
Stephen Kissa	5000 m	13:27.36	18	—N/a		did not advance	
Oscar Chelimo	5000 m	13:42.94	28	—N/a		did not advance	
Joshua Cheptegei	10,000 m	—N/a				26:48.36 WL	1st place, gold medalist(s)
Abdallah Kibet Mande	10,000 m	—N/a				28:31.49	17
Fred Musobo	Marathon	—N/a				2:13:42	13
Stephen Kiprotich	Marathon	—N/a				2:15:04	18
Solomon Mutai	Marathon	—N/a				did not finish	
Albert Chemutai	3000 m steeplechase	8:23.08	16	—N/a		did not advance	
Benjamin Kiplagat	3000 m steeplechase	8:24.44 SB	18	—N/a		did not advance	
Boniface Abel Sikowo	3000 m steeplechase	8:27.96	26	—N/a		did not advance	

=== Women ===
Track and road events

Athlete	Event	Heat		Semifinal		Final	
Athlete	Event	Result	Rank	Result	Rank	Result	Rank
Leni Shida	400 m	52.22	31	did not advance			
Halimah Nakaayi	800 m	2:02.33	14 Q	1:59.35 SB	1 Q	1:58.04 NR	1st place, gold medalist(s)
Winnie Nanyondo	800 m	2:00.36	1 Q	1:59.75	3 Q	1:59.18	4
Winnie Nanyondo	1500 m	4:04.04	4 Q	4:01.30	6 q	4:00.63	11
Esther Chebet	1500 m	4:08.89	26	did not advance			
Sarah Chelangat	5000 m	15:19.90	17	—N/a		did not advance	
Stella Chesang	10,000 m	—N/a				32:15.20	16
Rachael Zena Chebet	10,000 m	—N/a				32:41.93 PB	18
Juliet Chekwel	10,000 m	—N/a				33:28.18	20
Linet Toroitich Chebet	Marathon	—N/a				did not finish	
Peruth Chemutai	3000 m steeplechase	9:21.98	5 Q	—N/a		9:11.08 SB	11
