= 2019 World Athletics Championships – Women's marathon =

Long distance running race at the 2019 World Athletics Championships

Women's marathon at the 2019 World Championships
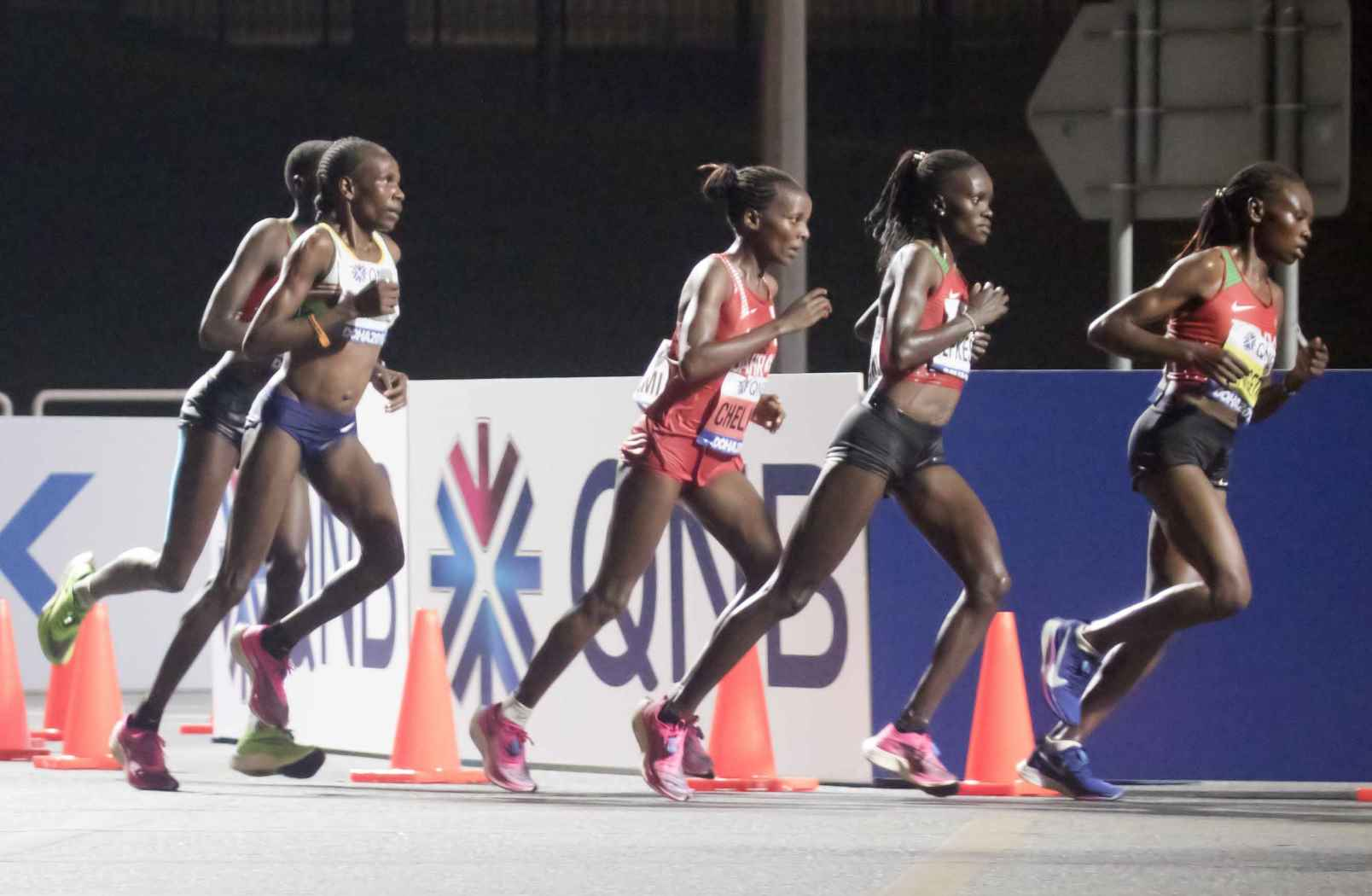
- The leading group
- Venue: Khalifa International Stadium
- Dates: 27 September
- Competitors: 68 from 41 nations
- Winning time: 2:32.43

Medalists
gold medal	Ruth Chepng'etich	Kenya
silver medal	Rose Chelimo	Bahrain
bronze medal	Helalia Johannes	Namibia

The women's marathon was one of the road events at the 2019 World Athletics Championships in Doha, Qatar. Due to the heat in Doha, the race was scheduled to begin at 23:59 on 27 September 2019, which made it the first midnight marathon in the history of the World Championships. Even with the unusual timing, the temperature was above 30 °C (86 °F) and the humidity over 70 per cent, making conditions difficult for running. Only 40 of the 68 entrants finished the race, which was won by Ruth Chepng'etich of Kenya in 2:32.43; the slowest winning time at the World Championships. Bahrain's Rose Chelimo was second in 2:33.46, with Helalia Johannes of Namibia third in 2:34.15.

The marathon was held on Doha Corniche, and consisted of six laps of a roughly 7-kilometre (4.3 mi) floodlit course. A group of six runners broke away during the first half of the race; Chepngetich, Chelimo, Johannes, Lonah Salpeter, Edna Kiplagat, and Visiline Jepkesho. Salpeter and Jepkesho dropped back, reducing the leading group to four, and then Chepngetich and Chelimo vied for the lead. At the start of the final lap, Chepngetich opened a gap at the front, eventually winning by over a minute. All the top ten finishers qualified automatically for the 2020 Summer Olympics.

== Qualification ==
The International Association of Athletics Federations (IAAF, now World Athletics) announced the qualifying criteria for the 2019 World Athletics Championships in December 2018. For the women's marathon, the entry standard was 2:37:00, eight minutes quicker than had been required for the 2017 marathon. Alternatively, a top-10 finish at an IAAF Gold Label marathon, or a wild card entry as the reigning world champion would ensure qualification. Entry criteria had to be met during the qualification period: 7 March 2018 to 6 September 2019, inclusive.

== Preview ==
Due to the hot conditions in Doha, the World Championships were scheduled in October, rather than the traditional August, and rather than holding the marathon during the day, it started at midnight local time to minimise the impact that the heat would have on the race, making it the first-ever night marathon at the World Championships. Despite these changes, the temperature was expected to be a key factor in the race: temperatures were predicted to be around 30 °C (86 °F), with humidity levels above 80 per cent. In mitigation, the IAAF added extra water stations and medical staff along the route, as well as more ice baths at the finish. The course consisted of six laps of a floodlit roughly 7-kilometre (4.3 mi) course along the Doha Corniche, a waterfront promenade on Doha Bay. The loop started in front of the Amiri Diwan, and stretched to the Sheraton Hotel.

Athletes from Bahrain, Ethiopia and Kenya were considered the favourites to win. Bahrain's Rose Chelimo had won in 2017, but two of her teammates had run quicker in 2019: Desi Mokonin and Shitaye Eshete. Ruth Chepngetich of Kenya held the world-leading time for 2019: 2:17:08 in Dubai in January. Other entrants included Lonah Salpeter of Israel, who had won gold in the 10,000 metres at the 2018 European Championships, and Helalia Johannes of Namibia, who had won the marathon at the 2018 Commonwealth Games in hot conditions. On the day leading up to the race, two of the 70 entrants withdrew: Great Britain's Tish Jones was suffering with a muscle injury in her leg, while Nikolina Šustić of Croatia had suspected food poisoning.

Both the high temperatures, and the tactical nature of World Championship races, meant that it was not expected that any records would be set. Paula Radcliffe held the World Championship record of 2:20:57 achieved in 2005, while Mary Keitany held the overall women's world record (in women only races) of 2:17:01, set during the 2017 London Marathon.

== Summary ==
The race was officially scheduled to start at 23:59 local time (UTC+3) on 27 September 2019; temperatures were higher than expected, at 32.7 °C (90.9 °F) and 73 per cent humidity. At the start of the race, Sardana Trofimova, a Russian runner cleared by the IAAF to run as an "Authorised Neutral Athlete", led the field. Around 5 kilometres (3.1 mi) into the race, which had 68 starters, a small pack broke away at the front, featuring Chepngetich, Chelimo, Salpeter, Edna Kiplagat, Visiline Jepkesho and Helalia Johannes. Chepngetich attempted to break away at the 10 kilometres (6.2 mi) point, but she was soon caught again. Salpeter dropped back from the group, and fell away to around a minute behind them. By the halfway stage, 16 of the 68 starters had pulled out. Salpeter began closing the gap on the leading group, and was back within eleven seconds when she collapsed and had to withdraw from the race. Some of the athletes dropping out required medical attention: Sara Dossena of Italy needed a wheelchair, while Uganda's Linet Toroitich Chebet had to be taken away by an ambulance. All three of Ethiopia's athletes withdrew: their coach, Haji Adillo Roba, said, "We never would have run a marathon in these conditions in our own country."

The leading group was reduced to four when Jepkesho fell back, and later Chepngetich and Chelimo moved away at the front. At the start of the final lap, Chepngetich was able to break away and opened up a gap to claim the gold medal. Her time of 2:32:43 was the slowest ever winning time at the World Championships. She finished just over a minute ahead of Chelimo, 2:33.46, while Johannes claimed the bronze medal in a time of 2:34.15. Only 40 of the 68 runners finished the race; and there were criticisms from many of the participants. Volha Mazuronak, who finished fifth, said "It's disrespect towards the athletes. A bunch of high-ranked officials gathered and decided that it would take [the World Championships] here but they are sitting in the cool and they are probably sleeping right now." Roberta Groner, who was one place further back, said "The key was to finish and not hurt myself." Lyndsay Tessier had similar sentiments: "It was really scary and intimidating and daunting. I'm just really grateful to have finished standing up."

Later in the day, the IAAF published a statement saying that no athletes had suffered heat stroke as a result of the race, and that the completion rate was similar to that seen in Tokyo in 1991 and Moscow in 2013. In total, they said that "Thirty athletes visited the Medical Centre as a precaution. A small number were kept under observation and one athlete was referred to the hospital for observation but later released."

== Results ==
The final took place on 27 September at 23:59. The results were as follows:

Rank	Name	Nationality	Time	Notes
1st place, gold medalist(s)	Ruth Chepng'etich	Kenya	2:32:43	
2nd place, silver medalist(s)	Rose Chelimo	Bahrain	2:33:46	
3rd place, bronze medalist(s)	Helalia Johannes	Namibia	2:34:15	
4	Edna Kiplagat	Kenya	2:35:36	SB
5	Volha Mazuronak	Belarus	2:36:21	
6	Roberta Groner	United States	2:38:44	
7	Mizuki Tanimoto	Japan	2:39:09	
8	Kim Ji-hyang	North Korea	2:41:24	
9	Lyndsay Tessier	Canada	2:42:03	SB
10	Jo Un-ok	North Korea	2:42:23	
11	Madoka Nakano	Japan	2:42:39	
12	Desi Mokonin	Bahrain	2:43:19	
13	Carrie Dimoff	United States	2:44:35	SB
14	Ri Kwang-ok	North Korea	2:46:16	
15	Visiline Jepkesho	Kenya	2:46:38	
16	Marta Galimany	Spain	2:47:45	
17	Nastassia Ivanova	Belarus	2:48:41	
18	Charlotta Fougberg	Sweden	2:49:17	
19	Anne-Mari Hyryläinen	Finland	2:51:26	
20	Marcela Joglová	Czech Republic	2:52:22	
21	Rutendo Nyahora	Zimbabwe	2:52:33	
22	Sardana Trofimova	Authorised Neutral Athletes	2:52:46	
23	Nazret Weldu	Eritrea	2:53:45	
24	Ma Yugui	China	2:55:24	
25	Galbadrakhyn Khishigsaikhan	Mongolia	2:56:15	
26	Alisa Vainio	Finland	2:56:30	SB
27	Melanie Myrand	Canada	2:57:40	
28	Carla Salomé Rocha	Portugal	2:58:19	
29	Gloria Priviletzio	Greece	2:58:43	
30	Valdilene dos Santos Silva	Brazil	2:59:00	
31	Manuela Soccol	Belgium	2:59:11	
32	Sviatlana Kudzelich	Belarus	3:00:38	
33	Ciren Cuomu	China	3:01:56	
34	Bayartsogtyn Mönkhzayaa	Mongolia	3:02:57	
35	Rochelle Rodgers	Australia	3:05:12	
36	Andreia Hessel	Brazil	3:06:13	
37	Johanna Bäcklund	Sweden	3:08:30	
38	Kelsey Bruce	United States	3:09:37	
39	Mayada Al-Sayad	Palestine	3:10:30	
40	Gabriela Traña	Costa Rica	3:19:13	
DNF	Elvan Abeylegesse	Turkey	DNF	
DNF	Ruti Aga	Ethiopia	DNF	
DNF	Bojana Bjeljac	Croatia	DNF	
DNF	Monika Bytautienė	Lithuania	DNF	
DNF	Fadime Çelik	Turkey	DNF	
DNF	Rosa Chacha	Ecuador	DNF	
DNF	Linet Toroitich Chebet	Uganda	DNF	
DNF	Shure Demise	Ethiopia	DNF	
DNF	Roza Dereje	Ethiopia	DNF	
DNF	Sara Dossena	Italy	DNF	
DNF	Giovanna Epis	Italy	DNF	
DNF	Shitaye Eshete	Bahrain	DNF	
DNF	Sasha Gollish	Canada	DNF	
DNF	Dagmara Handzlik	Cyprus	DNF	
DNF	Ayano Ikemitsu	Japan	DNF	
DNF	Sitora Khamidova	Uzbekistan	DNF	
DNF	Mariya Korobitskaya	Kyrgyzstan	DNF	
DNF	Li Dan	China	DNF	
DNF	Failuna Matanga	Tanzania	DNF	
DNF	Clémentine Mukandanga	Rwanda	DNF	
DNF	Elvanie Nimbona	Burundi	DNF	
DNF	Cecilia Norrbom	Sweden	DNF	
DNF	Matea Parlov Koštro	Croatia	DNF	
DNF	Charlotte Purdue	Great Britain & N.I.	DNF	
DNF	Lonah Salpeter	Israel	DNF	
DNF	Oleksandra Shafar	Ukraine	DNF	
DNF	Hanna Vandenbussche	Belgium	DNF	
DNF	Hiruni Kesara Wijayaratne	Sri Lanka	DNF	
DNS	Tish Jones	Great Britain & N.I.	DNS	
DNS	Nikolina Šustić	Croatia	DNS	
