= Kim Ji-hyang =

North Korean long-distance runner (born 1995)

Personal information
- Nationality: North Korean
- Born: 26 September 1995 (age 30)

Sport
- Sport: Athletics
- Event(s): 5000 m 10,000 m half marathon marathon

Kim Ji-hyang (born 26 September 1995) is a North Korean athlete competing in long-distance events. Representing North Korea at the 2019 World Athletics Championships, she placed eighth in the women's marathon.
