= Johanna Bäcklund =

Swedish long-distance runner

Personal information
- Nationality: Swedish
- Born: 9 June 1985 (age 40)

Sport
- Sport: Athletics
- Event: Marathon

Johanna Bäcklund (born 9 June 1985) is a Swedish athlete. She competed in the women's marathon event at the 2019 World Athletics Championships.
