= Madoka Nakano =

Japanese long-distance runner

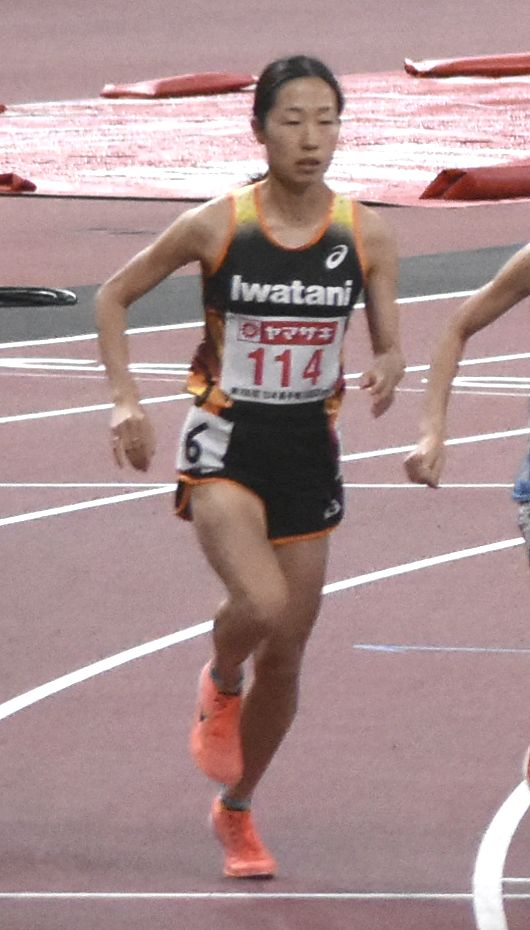
- Madoka Nakano

Personal information
- Nationality: Japanese
- Born: 14 August 1991 (age 34) Osaka Prefecture, Japan

Sport
- Sport: Athletics
- Event: Marathon

Madoka Nakano (中野 円花, Nakano Madoka; born 14 August 1991) is a Japanese athlete. She competed in the women's marathon event at the 2019 World Athletics Championships held in Doha, Qatar. She finished in 11th place. She also competed in the 2017 Tokyo Marathon and the 2018 Tokyo Marathon held in Tokyo, Japan.
