= Vasiliy Mizinov =

Russian racewalker

Personal information
- Full name: Vasiliy Vitalyevich Mizinov
- National team: Russia
- Born: 29 December 1997 (age 28) Magnitogorsk, Chelyabinsk Oblast, Russia

Sport
- Country: Russia
- Sport: Athletics
- Event: Racewalking
Medal record
Representing Authorised Neutral Athletes
World Championships
Silver medal – second place	2019 Doha	20 km walk
European Championships
Bronze medal – third place	2018 Berlin	20 km walk

Vasiliy Vitalyevich Mizinov (Russian: Василий Витальевич Мизинов; born 29 December 1997) is a Russian racewalking athlete. He won a bronze medal in 20 kilometres race walk at the 2018 European Athletics Championships. Representing the Authorised Neutral Athletes at the 2019 World Athletics Championships, he won a silver medal in 20 kilometres walk. At the 2020 Summer Olympics, taking place in Tokyo, Japan in 2021, he was disqualified for going off-course.
