= Turkey at the 2019 World Athletics Championships =

Turkey at the 2019 World Championships in Athletics
- WA code: TUR

in Doha
- Competitors: 18 (10 men and 8 women)
- Medals: Gold 0 Silver 0 Bronze 0 Total 0

World Championships in Athletics appearances (overview)
- 1983; 1987; 1991; 1993; 1995; 1997; 1999; 2001; 2003; 2005; 2007; 2009; 2011; 2013; 2015; 2017; 2019; 2022; 2023

Turkey competed at the 2019 World Athletics Championships in Doha, Qatar, from 27 September–6 October 2019.

== Result ==
Key

- Note–Ranks given for track events are for the entire round
- Q = Qualified for the next round
- q = Qualified for the next round as a fastest loser or, in field events, by position without achieving the qualifying target
- NR = National record
- GR = Games record
- PB = Personal best
- SB = Season best
- DNF = Did not finish
- DNS = Did not start
- NM = No mark
- N/A = Round not applicable for the event
- Bye = Athlete not required to compete in round

=== Men ===
Track and road events

Athlete	Event	Heat		Semifinal		Final	
Athlete	Event	Result	Rank	Result	Rank	Result	Rank
Ramil Guliyev	200 m	20.27	12 Q	20.16	6 Q	20.07	5
Yasmani Copello	400 m hurdles	49.75	16 q	48.39 SB	3 Q	48.25 SB	6
Kayhan Özer; Jak Ali Harvey; Emre Zafer Barnes; Ramil Guliyev	4 × 100 m relay	Disqualified		—		Did not advance	
Polat Kemboi Arıkan	Marathon	—				DNF	
Mert Girmalegesse	Marathon	—				DNF	
Salih Korkmaz	20 km walk	—				1:27:35	5

Field events

Athlete	Event	Qualification		Final	
Athlete	Event	Distance	Position	Distance	Position
Necati Er	Triple jump	16.87	12 q	16.34	11
Özkan Baltacı	Hammer throw	73.19	20	Did not advance	

=== Women ===
Track and road events

Athlete	Event	Heat		Semifinal		Final	
Athlete	Event	Result	Rank	Result	Rank	Result	Rank
Tuğba Güvenç	3000 m steeplechase	10:13.79	42	—		Did not advance	
Özlem Kaya	3000 m steeplechase	9:48.08	32	—		Did not advance	
Elvan Abeylegesse	Marathon	—				DNF	
Fadime Suna	Marathon	—				DNF	
Meryem Bekmez	20 km walk	—				1:39:36	24
Ayşe Tekdal	20 km walk	—				Disqualified	

Field events

Athlete	Event	Qualification		Final	
Athlete	Event	Distance	Position	Distance	Position
Emel Dereli	Shot put	17.71	16	Did not advance	
Eda Tuğsuz	Javelin throw	58.28	20	Did not advance	
