= 2019 World Athletics Championships – Men's 20 kilometres walk =

Men's 20 kilometres walk at the 2019 World Championships
- Venue: Khalifa International Stadium
- Dates: 4 October
- Competitors: 52 from 28 nations
- Winning time: 1:26:34

Medalists
gold medal	Toshikazu Yamanishi; Japan
silver medal	Vasiliy Mizinov; Authorised Neutral Athletes
bronze medal	Perseus Karlström; Sweden

The men's 20 kilometres walk at the 2019 World Athletics Championships was held at the Khalifa International Stadium in Doha, Qatar, on 4 October 2019.

== Records ==
Before the competition records were as follows:

Record	Perf.	Athlete	Nat.	Date	Location
World	1:16:36	Yusuke Suzuki	JPN	15 Mar 2015	Nomi, Japan
Championship	1:17:21	Jefferson Pérez	ECU	23 Aug 2003	Saint-Denis, France
World leading	1:17:15	Toshikazu Yamanishi	JPN	17 Mar 2019	Nomi, Japan
African	1:19:02	Hatem Ghoula	TUN	10 May 1997	Eisenhüttenstadt, Germany
Asian	1:16:36	Yusuke Suzuki	JPN	15 Mar 2015	Nomi, Japan
NACAC	1:17:46	Julio René Martínez	GUA	8 May 1999	Eisenhüttenstadt, Germany
South American	1:17:21	Jefferson Pérez	ECU	23 Aug 2003	Saint-Denis, France
European	1:17:02	Yohann Diniz	FRA	8 Mar 2015	Arles, France
Oceanian	1:17:33	Nathan Deakes	AUS	23 Apr 2015	Cixi, China

== Schedule ==
The event schedule, in local time (UTC+3), was as follows:

Date	Time	Round
4 October	23:30	Final

== Summary ==
The winner was Toshikazu Yamanishi of Japan, 15 seconds ahead of Vasiliy Mizinov, while Perseus Karlström won the bronze medal.

== Results ==
The race was started on 4 October at 23:29. The results were as follows:

Rank	Name	Nationality	Time	Notes
1st place, gold medalist(s)	Toshikazu Yamanishi	Japan	1:26:34	
2nd place, silver medalist(s)	Vasiliy Mizinov	Authorised Neutral Athletes	1:26:49	
3rd place, bronze medalist(s)	Perseus Karlström	Sweden	1:27:00	
4	Christopher Linke	Germany	1:27:19	
5	Salih Korkmaz	Turkey	1:27:35	
6	Koki Ikeda	Japan	1:29:02	
7	Tom Bosworth	Great Britain & N.I.	1:29:34	
8	Wang Kaihua	China	1:29:52	
9	Yin Jiaxing	China	1:29:53	
10	Eiki Takahashi	Japan	1:30:04	
11	Marius Žiūkas	Lithuania	1:30:22	
12	Erick Barrondo	Guatemala	1:30:40	
13	Caio Bonfim	Brazil	1:31:32	
14	Massimo Stano	Italy	1:31:36	
15	Dane Bird-Smith	Australia	1:32:11	
16	Kévin Campion	France	1:32:16	
17	Hagen Pohle	Germany	1:32:20	
18	Andrés Chocho	Ecuador	1:32:49	
19	Georgiy Sheiko	Kazakhstan	1:32:53	
20	Julio César Salazar	Mexico	1:33:02	
21	Choe Byeong-kwang	South Korea	1:33:10	
22	Álvaro Martín	Spain	1:33:20	
23	Brian Pintado	Ecuador	1:33:48	
24	Gabriel Bordier	France	1:34:06	
25	Matteo Giupponi	Italy	1:34:29	
26	Miguel Ángel López	Spain	1:35:00	
27	Irfan Kolothum Thodi	India	1:35:21	
28	Ivan Losev	Ukraine	1:35:42	
29	Luis Henry Campos	Peru	1:37:20	
30	Viktor Shumik	Ukraine	1:37:23	
31	Alex Wright	Ireland	1:37:33	
32	Dawid Tomala	Poland	1:38:15	
33	Samuel Gathimba	Kenya	1:40:45	
34	Eduard Zabuzhenko	Ukraine	1:41:04	
35	Diego García	Spain	1:41:14	
36	Devender Singh	India	1:41:48	
37	Kim Hyun-sub	South Korea	1:42:13	
38	Wayne Snyman	South Africa	1:43:57	
39	Moacir Zimmermann	Brazil	1:44:16	
40	Aliaksandr Liakhovich	Belarus	1:44:25	
	Rhydian Cowley	Australia	DNF	
	Cai Zelin	China	DNF	
	Mauricio Arteaga	Ecuador	DNF	
	Nils Brembach	Germany	DNF	
	José María Raymundo	Guatemala	DNF	
	Carlos Sánchez Cantera	Mexico	DNF	
	Richard Vargas	Venezuela	DNF	
	Jhon Castañeda	Colombia	DSQ	
	Callum Wilkinson	Great Britain & N.I.	DSQ	
	José Barrondo	Guatemala	DSQ	
	José Leyver Ojeda	Mexico	DSQ	
	José Mamani	Peru	DSQ	
	Evan Dunfee	Canada	DNS	
	Giorgio Rubino	Italy	DNS	
