= Mizuki Tanimoto =

Japanese long-distance runner

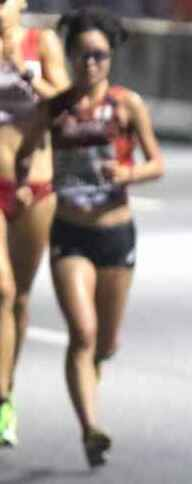

Personal information
- Nationality: Japanese
- Born: 18 December 1994 (age 30)

Sport
- Sport: Athletics
- Event(s): 10,000 m marathon

Mizuki Tanimoto (谷本 観月, Tanimoto Mizuki; born 18 December 1994) is a Japanese athlete competing in long-distance events. Representing Japan at the 2019 World Athletics Championships, she placed seventh in the women's marathon.
