= Spain at the 2019 World Athletics Championships =

Spain at the 2019 World Championships in Athletics
- WA code: ESP
- National federation: Real Federación Española de Atletismo
- Website: www.rfea.es

in Doha, Qatar 27 September 2019 – 6 October 2019
- Medals Ranked 31st: Gold 0 Silver 0 Bronze 1 Total 1

World Championships in Athletics appearances (overview)
- 1976; 1980; 1983; 1987; 1991; 1993; 1995; 1997; 1999; 2001; 2003; 2005; 2007; 2009; 2011; 2013; 2015; 2017; 2019; 2022; 2023

Spain competed at the 2019 World Championships in Athletics in Doha, Qatar, from 27 September to 6 October 2019.

== Medalists ==
The following competitors from Spain won medals at the 2019 World Championships.

Medal	Athlete	Event	Date
Bronze	Orlando Ortega	110 metres hurdles	2 October

== Results ==
The Spanish Athletics Federation named the first athletes of the team.

=== Men ===
Track and road events

Athlete	Event	Heat		Semifinal		Final	
Athlete	Event	Result	Rank	Result	Rank	Result	Rank
Adrián Ben	800 metres	1:46.12	17 Q	1:44.97 PB	5 q	1:45.58	6
Álvaro de Arriba	800 metres	1:45.67	7 q	1:46.09	16	did not advance	
Mariano García	800 metres	1:49.08	38	did not advance			
Jesús Gómez	1500 metres	3:36.72	8 q	3:40.29	24	did not advance	
Kevin López	1500 metres	3:37.62	15 Q	3:37.56	19	did not advance	
Adel Mechaal	1500 metres	3:37.95	25	did not advance			
Orlando Ortega	110 metres hurdles	13.15	1 Q	13.16	4 Q	13.30	3rd place, bronze medalist(s)
Sergio Fernández	400 metres hurdles	50.71	29	did not advance			
Daniel Arce	3000 metres steeplechase	8:31.69	28	—		did not advance	
Fernando Carro	3000 metres steeplechase	8:13.56	5 q	—		8:12.31	11
Ibrahim Ezzaydouni	3000 metres steeplechase	8:23.99	17	—		did not advance	
Juio Arenas; Darwin Echeverry; Samuel García; Oscar Husillos	4 × 400 metres relay	3:04.27	14	—		did not advance	
Daniel Mateo	Marathon	—				2:12:15	10
Diego García	20 kilometres walk	—				1:41:14	35
Miguel Ángel López	20 kilometres walk	—				1:35:00	26
Álvaro Martín	20 kilometres walk	—				1:33:20	22
Jesús Ángel García Bragado	50 kilometres walk	—				4:11:28	8
José Ignacio Díaz	50 kilometres walk	—				DNF	-
Marc Tur	50 kilometres walk	—				4:24:38	18

Field events

Athlete	Event	Qualification		Final	
Athlete	Event	Width Height	Rank	Width Height	Rank
Eusebio Cáceres	Long jump	8.01	6 q	8.01	7
Héctor Santos	Long jump	7.69	19	did not advance	
Javier Cienfuegos	Hammer throw	76.90	5 Q	76.57	7
Alberto González	Hammer throw	71.69	28	did not advance	

=== Women ===
Track and road events

Athlete	Event	Heat		Semifinal		Final	
Athlete	Event	Result	Rank	Result	Rank	Result	Rank
Esther Guerrero	1500 metres	4:06.99	9 q	4:16.66	19	did not advance	
Marta Pérez	1500 metres	4:07.48	13 Q	4:10.45	11	did not advance	
Irene Sánchez-Escribano	3000 metres steeplechase	9:37.34	20	—		did not advance	
Marta Galimany	Marathon	—				2:47:45	16
Laura García-Caro	20 kilometres walk	—				1:44:05	33
Raquel González	20 kilometres walk	—				1:38:02	15
María Pérez	20 kilometres walk	—				1:35:43	8
Mar Juárez	50 kilometres walk	—				4:39:28	10
Julia Takacs	50 kilometres walk	—				4:38:20	8

Field events

Athlete	Event	Qualification		Final	
Athlete	Event	Width Height	Rank	Width Height	Rank
Ana Peleteiro	Triple jump	14.23	8 q	14.47	6
Patricia Sarrapio	Triple jump	13.58	23	did not advance	
