= Rutendo Nyahora =

Zimbabwean long-distance runner

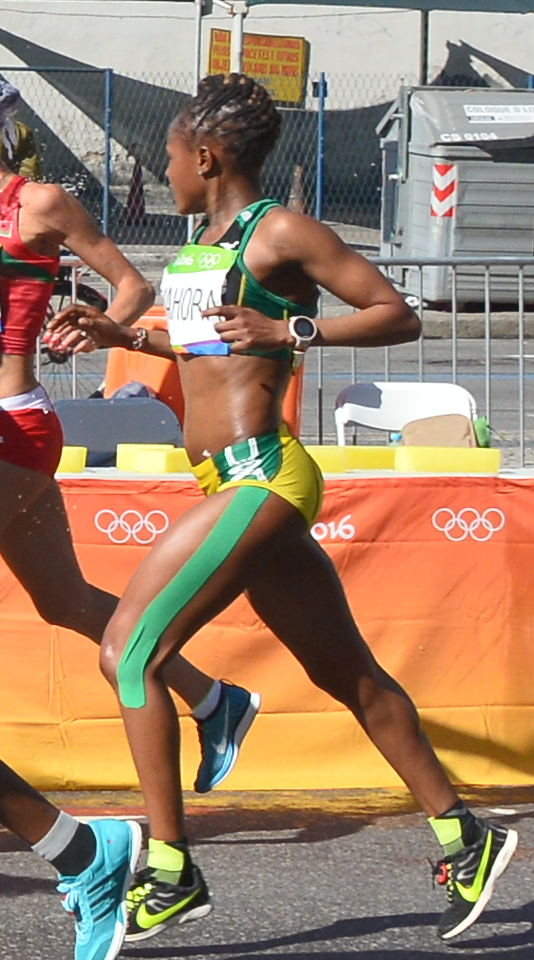
- Rutendo Nyahora at the 2016 Summer Olympics

Personal information
- Born: 11 November 1988 (age 37)

Sport
- Sport: Track and field
- Event: Marathon

Rutendo Nyahora (born 11 November 1988) is a Zimbabwean long-distance runner who specialises in the marathon. She competed in the women's marathon event at the 2016 Summer Olympics. In 2019, she competed in the women's marathon at the 2019 World Athletics Championships held in Doha, Qatar. She finished in 21st place. In 2024, she participated in the women’s marathon at the 2024 Summer Olympics, but did not receive a finishing position as she did not complete the race.
