= Lyndsay Tessier =

Canadian long-distance runner

Personal information
- Born: January 21, 1978 (age 47) Toronto, Ontario, Canada

Sport
- Sport: Athletics
- Event: marathon

Lyndsay Tessier (born January 21, 1978) is a Canadian athlete competing in long-distance events. Representing Canada at the 2019 World Athletics Championships, she placed ninth in the women's marathon. At the time she was a 41-year-old, full-time, Grade 3 teacher who had given up the sport in school and only returned to competitive running eight years earlier, well into her 30s.

She ran a personal best of 2:30:47 at the 2018 Berlin Marathon.
