= Authorised Neutral Athletes at the 2019 World Athletics Championships =

- WA code: ANA

in Doha, Qatar 27 September 2019 – 6 October 2019
- Competitors: 29 (13 men and 16 women) in 18 events
- Medals: Gold 2 Silver 3 Bronze 1 Total 6

World Athletics Championships appearances (overview)
- 2017; 2019; 2022–2025

Other related appearances
- Russia (1993–2015)

Authorised Neutral Athletes from Russia competed at the 2019 World Athletics Championships in Doha, Qatar, from 27 September to 6 October 2019. They were represented by 29 athletes.

== Medalists ==
Medal	Athlete	Event	Date
Gold	Anzhelika Sidorova	Women's pole vault	29 September 2019
Gold	Mariya Lasitskene	Women's high jump	30 September 2019
Silver	Sergey Shubenkov	Men's 110 metres hurdles	2 October 2019
Silver	Mikhail Akimenko	Men's high jump	4 October 2019
Silver	Vasiliy Mizinov	Men's 20 km walk	4 October 2019
Bronze	Ilya Ivanyuk	Men's high jump	4 October 2019

== Results ==
=== Men ===
Track and road events

Athlete	Event	Heat		Semifinal		Final	
Athlete	Event	Result	Rank	Result	Rank	Result	Rank
Fyodor Shutov	Marathon	—N/a				2:18:58	35
Sergey Shubenkov	110 metres hurdles	13.27	4 Q	13.18	5 Q	13.15	2nd place, silver medalist(s)
Vasiliy Mizinov	20 kilometres walk	—N/a				1:26:49	2nd place, silver medalist(s)

Field events

Athlete	Event	Qualification		Final	
Athlete	Event	Result	Rank	Result	Rank
Mikhail Akimenko	High jump	2.29	=1 q	2.35	2nd place, silver medalist(s)
Ilya Ivanyuk	High jump	2.29	=1 q	2.35	3rd place, bronze medalist(s)
Alexey Fyodorov	Triple jump	16.71	18	Did not advance	
Dmitriy Sorokin	Triple jump	16.86	14	Did not advance	
Maksim Afonin	Shot put	19.82	28	Did not advance	
Aleksandr Lesnoy	Shot put	19.62	31	Did not advance	
Aleksey Khudyakov	Discus throw	61.27	24	Did not advance	
Yevgeniy Korotovskiy	Hammer throw	76.36	9 q	75.14	12
Denis Lukyanov	Hammer throw	73.47	19	Did not advance	

Combined events – Decathlon

Athlete	Event	100 m	LJ	SP	HJ	400 m	110H	DT	PV	JT	1500 m	Final	Rank
Ilya Shkurenyov	Result	11.02	7.61	14.71	2.11	49.36	14.28	48.75	5.20	59.56	4:41.95	8494	4
Ilya Shkurenyov	Points	856	962	772	906	844	939	844	972	731	668	8494	4

=== Women ===
Track and road events

Athlete	Event	Heat		Semifinal		Final	
Athlete	Event	Result	Rank	Result	Rank	Result	Rank
Kseniya Aksyonova	400 metres	51.99	25	Did not advance			
Alyona Mamina	400 metres	52.15	28	Did not advance			
Polina Miller	400 metres	51.96	24	Did not advance			
Sardana Trofimova	Marathon	—N/a				2:52:46	22
Valeriya Andreyeva	400 metres hurdles	56.79	27	Did not advance			
Vera Rudakova	400 metres hurdles	55.51	14 Q	55.57	18	Did not advance	
Yekaterina Ivonina	3000 metres steeplechase	9:35.59	19	—N/a		Did not advance	
Anna Tropina	3000 metres steeplechase	9:44.06	26	—N/a		Did not advance	
Yana Smerdova	20 kilometres walk	—N/a				1:43:49	31

Field events

Athlete	Event	Qualification		Final	
Athlete	Event	Result	Rank	Result	Rank
Mariya Lasitskene	High jump	1.94	3 Q	2.04	1st place, gold medalist(s)
Irina Ivanova	Pole vault	4.35	=29	Did not advance	
Alyona Lutkovskaya	Pole vault	4.35	27	Did not advance	
Anzhelika Sidorova	Pole vault	4.60	=1 Q	4.95	1st place, gold medalist(s)
Darya Klishina	Long jump	DNS			
Yelena Sokolova	Long jump	6.43	24	Did not advance	
Sofiya Palkina	Hammer throw	68.53	19	Did not advance	
Yelizaveta Tsareva	Hammer throw	70.35	15	Did not advance	
