= Kirara Shiraishi =

Japanese sprinter

Personal information
- Nationality: Japanese
- Born: 31 May 1996 (age 30) Izumi, Kagoshima Prefecture, Japan
- Height: 1.80 m (5 ft 11 in)

Sport
- Country: Japan
- Sport: Athletics
- Event: Sprinting
Medal record
Men's athletics
Representing Japan
World Championships
Bronze medal – third place	2019 Doha	4×100 m relay

Kirara Shiraishi (白石 黄良々, Kirara Shiraishi; born 31 May 1996) is a Japanese athlete. He competed in the men's 200 metres event at the 2019 World Athletics Championships.
