= 2019 World Athletics Championships =

Athletics competition Doha, Qatar

IAAF World Athletics Championships Doha 2019
- Host city: Doha
- Country: Qatar
- Organisers: World Athletics, Qatar Athletics Federation
- Edition: 17th
- Nations: 206
- Athletes: 1,772
- Sport: Athletics
- Events: 49 (24 men, 24 women, 1 mixed)
- Dates: 27 September – 6 October
- Opened by: Emir Tamim bin Hamad Al Thani
- Closed by: World Athletics President Sebastian Coe
- Main venue: Khalifa International Stadium
- Individual prize money (US$): 60,000 (gold); 30,000 (silver); 20,000 (bronze)
- Team prize money (US$): 80,000 (relay gold); 40,000 (silver); 20,000 (bronze)
- Website: iaafworldathleticschamps.com/doha2019

The 2019 IAAF World Athletics Championships (Arabic: بطولة العالم لألعاب القوى 2019) was the seventeenth edition of the biennial, global athletics competition organised by the International Association of Athletics Federations (IAAF), since renamed World Athletics. It was held between 27 September and 6 October 2019 in Doha, Qatar, at the renovated multi-purpose Khalifa International Stadium, but reduced to 21,000 available seats. 1,772 athletes from 206 teams competed in 49 athletics events over the ten-day competition, comprising 24 events each for men and women, plus a mixed relay. There were 43 track and field events, 4 racewalking events, and 2 marathon road running events. The racewalking and marathon events were held in Doha Corniche.

It was the first edition of the competition under its modified name, having previously been known as the World Championships in Athletics, and the last held before the IAAF assumed its new identity as World Athletics. It was also the first time the competition was in the Middle East and also the first time it ended in October. Due to the hot climate, there were no morning sessions and events were held in the late afternoon onward. Long-distance road events were scheduled to start around midnight local time. For the first time, sponsors of national teams were permitted to appear on the kit that the athletes compete in.

Some athletes competing in Doha criticised the lack of spectators, the flat atmosphere, the heat, and the timing of events, and also questioned why Doha was awarded the championships at all; despite this, World Athletics President Sebastian Coe described the 2019 Championships as the best in history, in terms of the quality of performances produced by the athletes.

Three world records were set, and six championships records were broken. A total of 43 nations reached the medal table, and 68 nations had an athlete with a top eight finish. Based on the IAAF scoring tables, the best male and female performers were men's shot put gold medallist Joe Kovacs, and women's long jump gold medalist Malaika Mihambo.

== Organisation ==
=== Host selection ===
Three cities entered the bidding process to host the event. Assessment of the bids was carried out by the IAAF Evaluation Commission, which consisted of three IAAF Council Members (IAAF Vice President Sebastian Coe, Abby Hoffman and Katsuyuki Tanaka), three IAAF Office members (Essar Gabriel, Nick Davies and Paul Hardy), public relations staff from Dentsu (Ryo Wakabayashi) as well as marketing staff from Athletics Management & Services (Nigel Swinscoe).

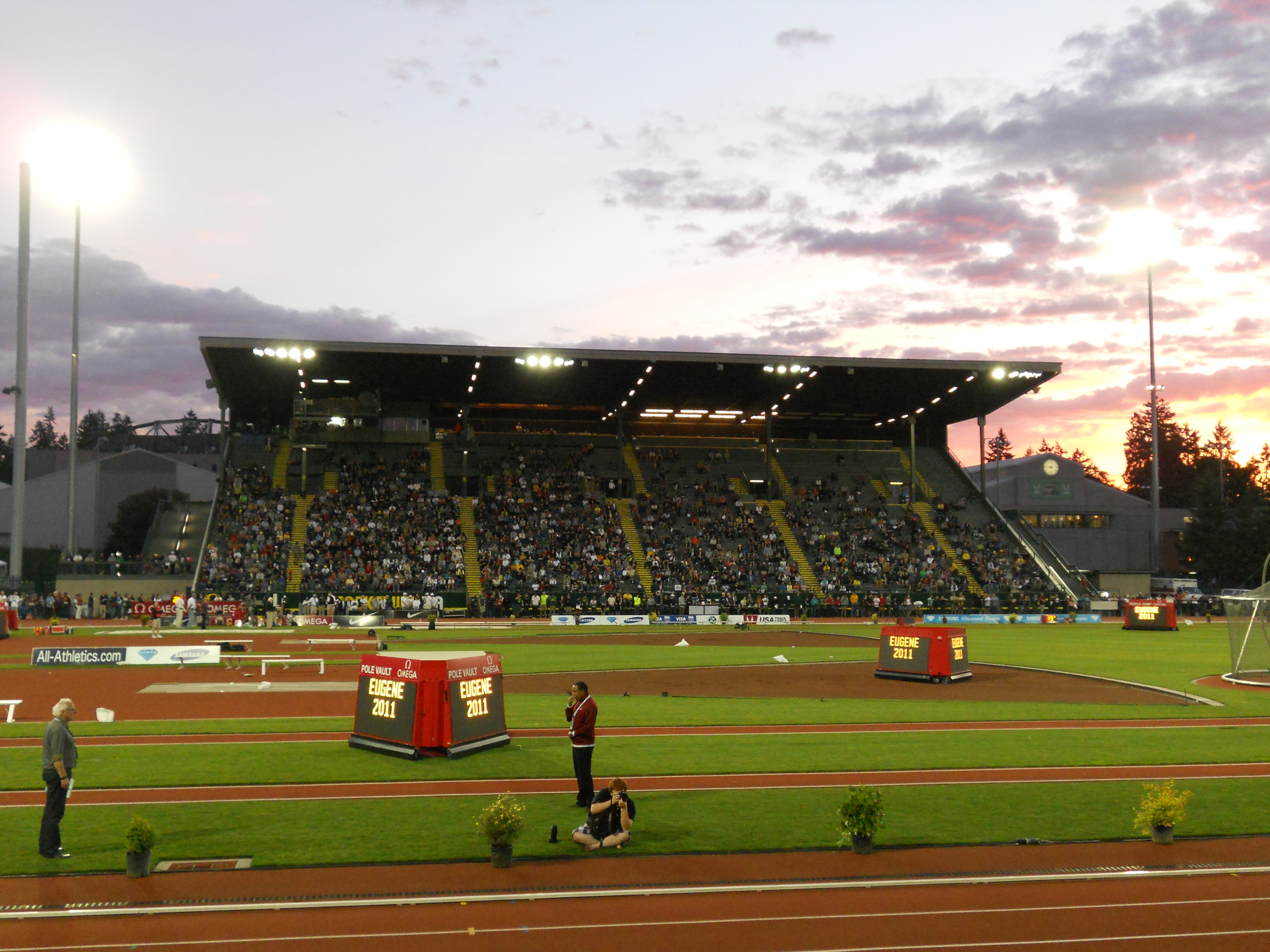
Hayward Field, venue of the Eugene bid, which failed to win the 2019 hosting rights but was awarded the 2022 event. The next event was to have been held in 2021, but the 2021 Summer Olympics rescheduling as a byproduct of the COVID-19 pandemic forced World Athletics to change the date a year on 30 March 2020.

Both Doha and Eugene are hosts of IAAF Diamond League meetings. Doha had previously applied for and failed to win the bid for the 2017 World Championships in Athletics, and had hosted the 2010 IAAF World Indoor Championships. Sheikh Saoud bin Abdulrahman Al Thani, a member of Qatar's ruling family, led the Doha bid. The bid was part of a movement among the leaders of Qatar to make the country a destination for international sports tourism, within the framework of the Qatar National Vision 2030, which included the hosting of global sports events, such as the 2014 FINA World Swimming Championships (25 m), 2018 World Artistic Gymnastics Championships, the 2022 FIFA World Cup, and a Doha bid for the 2020 Summer Olympics.

Eugene had hosted the 2014 World Junior Championships in Athletics. Barcelona hosted the 2012 World Junior Championships in Athletics and the 2010 European Athletics Championships, as well as the annual Míting Internacional d´Atletisme Ciutat de Barcelona. The final selection of the host city was carried out on 18 November 2014 in Monaco.

City	Country	Round 1	Round 2
Doha	Qatar	12	15
Eugene	United States	9	12
Barcelona	Spain	6	—

Barcelona was eliminated in the first round of voting, receiving only six of the 27 votes, then Doha prevailed in the final round with fifteen votes to Eugene's twelve. The IAAF later awarded Eugene the hosting rights for the next championships, which was later moved to 2022. IAAF President said that the Doha bid would develop the country and its community through sport. José María Odriozola, the president of the Royal Spanish Athletics Federation, said that the worst bid had won the vote and "the only thing they have there is money".

In 2016, the French newspaper Le Monde claimed the selection of the host would have been paid with US$3.5 million transferred between October and November 2011 according to the US tax administration, to Papa Massata Diack, the son of Lamine Diack (former president of the IAAF). In 2019 The Guardian reported documents showing an agreement to pay US$4.5 million to Sporting Age, a Singapore-based company linked to Papa Massata Diack, in order to transfer the value of World Championships ticket sales and sponsorship to Qatari officials. In 2019, the French prosecutors charged some protagonists for corruption: the head of beIN Sports Yousef Al-Obaidly, the former president of IAAF Lamine Diack, and the head of Paris Saint Germain Nasser Al-Khelaifi. A French judge opened investigations into Dentsu and Athletics Management & Services in 2019, on the basis that the companies (which had been involved in the host evaluation) had played key roles in the diversion of funds to Papa Massata Diack.

The selection of Doha as the host city was later criticised by numerous athletes present at the championships. Marathon fifth-placer Volha Mazuronak said organisers were disrespectful to athletes to make them compete in the conditions, and 50 km walk world champion Yohann Diniz was unhappy that the road events had not been located in the air-conditioned stadium instead. Decathlon world record holder Kevin Mayer said organisers had not prioritised athletes in respect of the climate and low spectator attendance. In response to low attendances, the stadium capacity was reduced to 21,000 for the championships, with large banners covering the empty seats, yet on the third day less than half these seats were filled despite the organisers giving free tickets to migrant workers and children. In response to the issue, IAAF Chief Executive Jon Ridgeon worked with the local organisers to take attendance-boosting measures. Ridgeon suggested that sessions were organised late in the evening for European television audiences, which meant working Qataris had gone home before the last event finals had begun (around 11 pm local time). He also said the IAAF's plan had been for the championships to serve people across the Middle East, but the Qatar diplomatic crisis had blocked people from other countries in the region from attending. Three days before the competition it was reported that 50,000 tickets had been sold for the 10-day event, signalling a 90% reduction in sales compared to the 2017 World Championships in Athletics. In response, local organisers purchased tickets and distributed them for free to ensure sizeable attendances, and also ran an initiative to allow spectators to enter the stadium and fill vacant seats left by audience members who left mid-session.

The issue of human rights in Qatar was also raised as over 6,000 migrant labourers, some involved in construction and cleaning of the host stadium, had lodged complaints over unpaid wages against Qatari companies. IAAF President Coe responded that the championships was a way to achieve social change and "rise above political structures".

=== Venue ===
The decision to hold the World Athletics Championships in the Middle East presented organisational challenges due to the hot and humid climate in Doha in September and October. In previous years the World Championships had mostly qualifying competitions in morning sessions and finals mostly in afternoon sessions. Weather conditions meant that traditional arrangement was not workable and in Doha the schedule was redesigned to have a "pre-session" in the afternoon and a "main session" in the evening. The Khalifa International Stadium used an open-air conditioning system to bring the temperature of the stadium to below 25 °C (77 °F), which was a world first for a stadium.

In collaboration with Seiko, a starting blocks camera view was broadcast from the Khalifa International Stadium's Block Cams. The intimate views from the blocks were the subject of complaint by the German Athletics Association, which said its female sprinters had not been consulted on the broadcasting of the images. The IAAF agreed to only show Block Cam images of athletes immediately prior to the starting pistol and to delete video data at other times on a daily basis. Gina Lückenkemper said the technology was "unpleasant" as it captured close images of athletes' crotches in tight clothing. The stadium also features an advanced lighting system, which was used in the introductions of some event finals, projecting coloured lines on to the lane boundaries and the competing athlete's names moving around the 400 m track. New graphical detail of athletes' performance was provided in television coverage, including top speed of athletes in the track and jumping events, angle and release speed in the throws, and the distance of each phase of a triple jump.

Non-stadium racewalking and marathon events were set on a looped course around the Doha Corniche – a 7-kilometre (4.3 mi) waterfront promenade. Organisers set the start time around midnight local time for road events to avoid the hottest conditions, although the women's marathon still began at a temperature of 32 °C (90 °F) and humidity over 70%. The IAAF and local organisers undertook preparation for the conditions by recruiting medical experts to inform their preparations, as well as increasing water and refreshments, ice baths, and medical support along the route. It sent advisory notices to all national federations in the six months before the competition with recommendations for athletes. However, postponement of the events until after the championships was deemed a last resort. The IAAF President Sebastian Coe stated his belief that the humidity was a greater challenge for runners than the temperature itself.

The Khalifa Stadium hosted the 2019 Asian Athletics Championships in April before the world event.

For training and warm-up purposes, an outdoor venue attached to the Khalifa Stadium is available for athletes in running and jumping events, while all athletes (including throwing events) have full training facilities available at the Qatar Sports Club venue near Doha Corniche. At the Aspire Zone, indoor training facilities are available for running and jumping disciplines while a separate outdoor throws training venue is also available.

Venues of the 2019 World Athletics Championships
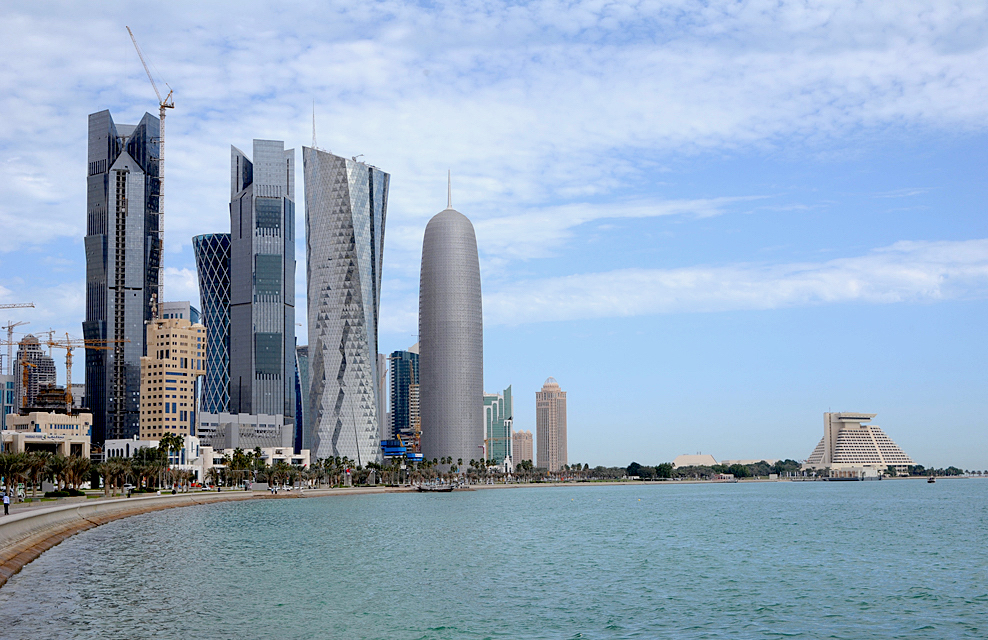
View of the Doha Corniche which was the route for the marathon and racewalking events.

=== Mascot ===
The event mascot was "Falah", an anthropomorphic falcon dressed in athletic gear in the maroon colour of the flag of Qatar. The mascot was designed by a Filipino expatriate in Doha, Theodore Paul Manuel, and his design was announced as the winner of the design competition on Qatar's national sports day. Twenty-one sketches were submitted and a group of young Qataris were invited to vote on their favourite designs. Following this, the head of the Qatar Olympic Committee Joaan bin Hamad bin Khalifa Al Thani and members of the local organising committee narrowed the choices down to a shortlist of three for final voting.

== Entry standards ==
The IAAF announced that athletes would qualify by their IAAF World Rankings position, wildcard (reigning world champion or 2019 IAAF Diamond League champion) or by achieving the entry standard. Following criticism that the qualification method was biased, the IAAF reverted to their traditional qualifying method. The qualification period for the 10,000 metres, marathon, race walks, relays, and combined events ran from 7 March 2018 to 6 September 2019. For all other events, the qualification period runs from 7 September 2018 to 6 September 2019. Wild Card as:

- Reigning World Outdoor Champion
- Winner of the 2019 IAAF Diamond League
- Leader (as at closing date of the qualification period):
  - IAAF Hammer Throw Challenge
  - IAAF Race Walking Challenge
  - IAAF Combined Events Challenge

Countries who have no male and/or no female athletes who have achieved the Entry Standard or considered as having achieved the entry standard (see above) or qualified relay team, may enter one unqualified male athlete OR one unqualified female athlete in one event of the championships (except the road events and field events, combined events, 10,000 m and 3000 m steeplechase).

Event	Men	Number	Women	Number
100 metres	10.10	48	11.24	48
200 metres	20.40	56	23.02	56
400 metres	45.30	48	51.80	48
800 metres	1:45.80	48	2:00.60	48
1500 metres (Mile)	3:36.00 (3:53.10)	45	4:06.50 (4:25.20)	45
5000 metres	13:22.50	42	15:22.00	42
10,000 metres	27:40.00	27	31:50.00	27
Marathon	2:16:00	100	2:37:00	100
3000 metres steeplechase	8:29.00	45	9:40.00	45
110/100 metres hurdles	13.46	40	12.98	40
400 metres hurdles	49.30	40	56.00	40
High jump	2.30 m (7 ft 6 1/2 in)	32	1.94 m (6 ft 4 1/4 in)	32
Pole vault	5.71 m (18 ft 8 3/4 in)	32	4.56 m (14 ft 11 1/2 in)	32
Long jump	8.17 m (26 ft 9 1/2 in)	32	6.72 m (22 ft 1/2 in)	32
Triple jump	16.95 m (55 ft 7 1/4 in)	32	14.20 m (46 ft 7 in)	32
Shot put	20.70 m (67 ft 10 3/4 in)	32	18.00 m (59 ft 1/2 in)	32
Discus throw	65.00 m (213 ft 3 in)	32	61.20 m (200 ft 9 1/4 in)	32
Hammer throw	76.00 m (249 ft 4 in)	32	71.00 m (232 ft 11 1/4 in)	32
Javelin throw	83.00 m (272 ft 3 1/2 in)	32	61.50 m (201 ft 9 1/4 in)	32
Decathlon/Heptathlon	8200	24	6300	24
20 kilometres race walk	1:22:30	30	1:33:30	30
50 kilometres race walk	3:59:00	50	4:30:00	30
4 × 100 metres relay	Top 10 @ 2019 IAAF World Relays + 6 from Top Lists	16	Top 10 @ 2019 IAAF World Relays + 6 from Top Lists	16
4 × 400 metres relay	Top 10 @ 2019 IAAF World Relays + 6 from Top Lists	16	Top 10 @ 2019 IAAF World Relays + 6 from Top Lists	16
4 × 400 metres relay mixed	Top 12 @ 2019 IAAF World Relays + 4 from Top Lists	16	Top 12 @ 2019 IAAF World Relays + 4 from Top Lists	16

=== Target numbers ===
At the end of the qualification period, the 2019 IAAF World Rankings published on 6 September 2019 were used to invite additional athletes to the World Championships where the target number of athletes had not been achieved for that event through other methods of qualification. The maximum of three athletes per country in individual events is not affected by this rule. National athletics associations retained the right to confirm or reject athlete selections through this method. Where the highest ranked athletes were from a country that had already had three or more entrants for the event, or where the national association rejected an entrant, the next highest ranked athlete became eligible for entry via world rankings.

== Event schedule ==
Sex	Event	27 Sep	28 Sep	29 Sep	30 Sep	1 Oct	2 Oct	3 Oct	4 Oct	5 Oct	6 Oct
Men	100 m	P	S								
Men	100 m	H	F								
Men	200 m			H	S	F					
Men	400 m					H	S		F		
Men	800 m		H	S		F					
Men	1500 m							H	S		F
Men	5000 m	H			F						
Men	10,000 m										F
Men	Marathon									F	
Men	3000 m steeplechase					H			F		
Men	110 m hurdles				H		S				
Men	110 m hurdles				H		F				
Men	400 m hurdles	H	S		F						
Men	Decathlon						F	F			
Men	High jump					Q			F		
Men	Pole vault		Q			F					
Men	Long jump	Q	F								
Men	Triple jump	Q		F							
Men	Shot put							Q		F	
Men	Discus throw		Q		F						
Men	Hammer throw					Q	F				
Men	Javelin throw									Q	F
Men	20 km walk								F		
Men	50 km walk		F								
Men	4 × 100 m relay								H	F	
Men	4 × 400 m relay									H	F
Women	100 m		H	S							
Women	100 m		H	F							
Women	200 m				H	S	F				
Women	400 m				H	S		F			
Women	800 m	H	S		F						
Women	1500 m						H	S		F	
Women	5000 m						H			F	
Women	10,000 m		F								
Women	Marathon	F									
Women	3000 m steeplechase	H			F						
Women	100 m hurdles									H	S
Women	100 m hurdles									H	F
Women	400 m hurdles					H	S		F		
Women	Heptathlon						F	F			
Women	High jump	Q			F						
Women	Pole vault	Q		F							
Women	Long jump									Q	F
Women	Triple jump							Q		F	
Women	Shot put						Q	F			
Women	Discus throw						Q		F		
Women	Hammer throw	Q	F								
Women	Javelin throw				Q	F					
Women	20 km walk			F							
Women	50 km walk		F								
Women	4 × 100 m relay								H	F	
Women	4 × 400 m relay									H	F
Mixed	4 × 400 m relay		H	F							

== Results ==
=== Men ===
==== Track ====
Chronology: 2015 | 2017 | 2019 | 2021 | 2023

Event	Gold		Silver		Bronze	
100 metres	Christian Coleman; United States (USA)	9.76 WL	Justin Gatlin; United States (USA)	9.89	Andre De Grasse; Canada (CAN)	9.90 SB
200 metres	Noah Lyles; United States (USA)	19.83	Andre De Grasse; Canada (CAN)	19.95	Álex Quiñónez; Ecuador (ECU)	19.98
400 metres	Steven Gardiner; Bahamas (BAH)	43.48 NR	Anthony Zambrano; Colombia (COL)	44.15 AR	Fred Kerley; United States (USA)	44.17
800 metres	Donavan Brazier; United States (USA)	1:42.34 CR, AR	Amel Tuka; Bosnia and Herzegovina (BIH)	1:43.47 SB	Ferguson Rotich; Kenya (KEN)	1:43.82
1500 metres	Timothy Cheruiyot; Kenya (KEN)	3:29.26	Taoufik Makhloufi; Algeria (ALG)	3:31.38 SB	Marcin Lewandowski; Poland (POL)	3:31.46 NR
5000 metres	Muktar Edris; Ethiopia (ETH)	12:58.85 SB	Selemon Barega; Ethiopia (ETH)	12:59.70	Mohamed Ahmed; Canada (CAN)	13:01.11
10,000 metres	Joshua Cheptegei; Uganda (UGA)	26:48.36 WL	Yomif Kejelcha; Ethiopia (ETH)	26:49.34 SB	Andamlak Belihu; Ethiopia (ETH)	26:56.71
Marathon	Lelisa Desisa; Ethiopia (ETH)	2:10:40 SB	Mosinet Geremew; Ethiopia (ETH)	2:10:44	Amos Kipruto; Kenya (KEN)	2:10:51
110 metres hurdles	Grant Holloway; United States (USA)	13.10	Sergey Shubenkov; Authorised Neutral Athletes (ANA)	13.15	Pascal Martinot-Lagarde; France (FRA) Orlando Ortega; Spain (ESP)	13.18 13.30
400 metres hurdles	Karsten Warholm; Norway (NOR)	47.42	Rai Benjamin; United States (USA)	47.66	Abderrahman Samba; Qatar (QAT)	48.03
3000 metres steeplechase	Conseslus Kipruto; Kenya (KEN)	8:01.35 WL	Lamecha Girma; Ethiopia (ETH)	8:01.36 NR	Soufiane El Bakkali; Morocco (MAR)	8:03.76 SB
20 kilometres walk	Toshikazu Yamanishi; Japan (JPN)	1:26.34	Vasiliy Mizinov; Authorised Neutral Athletes (ANA)	1:26.49	Perseus Karlström; Sweden (SWE)	1:27.00
50 kilometres walk	Yusuke Suzuki; Japan (JPN)	4:04.20	João Vieira; Portugal (POR)	4:04.59	Evan Dunfee; Canada (CAN)	4:05.02
4 × 100 metres relay	United States; Christian Coleman; Justin Gatlin; Mike Rodgers; Noah Lyles; Cravon Gillespie*	37.10 WL	Great Britain; Adam Gemili; Zharnel Hughes; Richard Kilty; Nethaneel Mitchell-Blake	37.36 AR	Japan; Shuhei Tada; Kirara Shiraishi; Yoshihide Kiryū; Abdul Hakim Sani Brown; Yuki Koike*	37.43 AR
4 × 400 metres relay	United States; Fred Kerley; Michael Cherry; Wilbert London; Rai Benjamin; Tyrell Richard*; Vernon Norwood*; Nathan Strother*	2:56.69 WL	Jamaica; Akeem Bloomfield; Nathon Allen; Terry Thomas; Demish Gaye; Javon Francis*	2:57.90 SB	Belgium; Jonathan Sacoor; Robin Vanderbemden; Dylan Borlée; Kevin Borlée; Julien Watrin*	2:58.78 SB
WR world record | AR area record | CR championship record | GR games record | NR national record | OR Olympic record | PB personal best | SB season best | WL world leading (in a given season)

* Indicates the athletes only competed in the preliminary heats and received medals.

==== Field ====
Chronology: 2015 | 2017 | 2019 | 2021 | 2023

Event	Gold		Silver		Bronze	
High jump	Mutaz Essa Barshim; Qatar (QAT)	2.37 m WL	Mikhail Akimenko; Authorised Neutral Athletes (ANA)	2.35 m PB	Ilya Ivanyuk; Authorised Neutral Athletes (ANA)	2.35 m SB
Pole vault	Sam Kendricks; United States (USA)	5.97 m	Armand Duplantis; Sweden (SWE)	5.97 m	Piotr Lisek; Poland (POL)	5.87 m
Long jump	Tajay Gayle; Jamaica (JAM)	8.69 m WL, NR	Jeff Henderson; United States (USA)	8.39 m SB	Juan Miguel Echevarría; Cuba (CUB)	8.34 m
Triple jump	Christian Taylor; United States (USA)	17.92 m SB	Will Claye; United States (USA)	17.74 m	Hugues Fabrice Zango; Burkina Faso (BUR)	17.66 m AR
Shot put	Joe Kovacs; United States (USA)	22.91 m CR	Ryan Crouser; United States (USA)	22.90 m SB	Tom Walsh; New Zealand (NZL)	22.90 m AR
Discus throw	Daniel Ståhl; Sweden (SWE)	67.59 m	Fedrick Dacres; Jamaica (JAM)	66.94 m	Lukas Weißhaidinger; Austria (AUT)	66.82 m
Javelin throw	Anderson Peters; Grenada (GRN)	86.89 m	Magnus Kirt; Estonia (EST)	86.21 m	Johannes Vetter; Germany (GER)	85.37 m
Hammer throw	Paweł Fajdek; Poland (POL)	80.50 m	Quentin Bigot; France (FRA)	78.19 m SB	Bence Halász; Hungary (HUN) Wojciech Nowicki; Poland (POL)	78.18 m 77.69 m
WR world record | AR area record | CR championship record | GR games record | NR national record | OR Olympic record | PB personal best | SB season best | WL world leading (in a given season)

==== Combined ====
Chronology: 2015 | 2017 | 2019 | 2021 | 2023

Event	Gold		Silver		Bronze	
Decathlon	Niklas Kaul; Germany (GER)	8691 PB	Maicel Uibo; Estonia (EST)	8604 PB	Damian Warner; Canada (CAN)	8529
WR world record | AR area record | CR championship record | GR games record | NR national record | OR Olympic record | PB personal best | SB season best | WL world leading (in a given season)

=== Women ===
==== Track ====
Chronology: 2015 | 2017 | 2019 | 2021 | 2023

Event	Gold		Silver		Bronze	
100 metres	Shelly-Ann Fraser-Pryce; Jamaica (JAM)	10.71 WL	Dina Asher-Smith; Great Britain & N.I. (GBR)	10.83 NR	Marie-Josée Ta Lou; Ivory Coast (CIV)	10.90
200 metres	Dina Asher-Smith; Great Britain & N.I. (GBR)	21.88 NR	Brittany Brown; United States (USA)	22.22 PB	Mujinga Kambundji; Switzerland (SUI)	22.51
400 metres	Salwa Eid Naser; Bahrain (BHR)	48.14 AR, WL	Shaunae Miller-Uibo; Bahamas (BAH)	48.37 AR	Shericka Jackson; Jamaica (JAM)	49.47 PB
800 metres	Halimah Nakaayi; Uganda (UGA)	1:58.04 NR	Raevyn Rogers; United States (USA)	1:58.18 SB	Ajeé Wilson; United States (USA)	1:58.84
1500 metres	Sifan Hassan; Netherlands (NED)	3:51.95 CR, AR	Faith Kipyegon; Kenya (KEN)	3:54.22 NR	Gudaf Tsegay; Ethiopia (ETH)	3:54.38 PB
5000 metres	Hellen Obiri; Kenya (KEN)	14:26.72 CR	Margaret Kipkemboi; Kenya (KEN)	14:27.49 PB	Konstanze Klosterhalfen; Germany (GER)	14:28.43
10,000 metres	Sifan Hassan; Netherlands (NED)	30:17.62 WL	Letesenbet Gidey; Ethiopia (ETH)	30:21.23 PB	Agnes Jebet Tirop; Kenya (KEN)	30:25.20 PB
Marathon	Ruth Chepngetich; Kenya (KEN)	2:32:43	Rose Chelimo; Bahrain (BHR)	2:33:46	Helalia Johannes; Namibia (NAM)	2:34:15
100 metres hurdles	Nia Ali; United States (USA)	12.34 PB	Kendra Harrison; United States (USA)	12.46	Danielle Williams; Jamaica (JAM)	12.47
400 metres hurdles	Dalilah Muhammad; United States (USA)	52.16 WR	Sydney McLaughlin; United States (USA)	52.23 PB	Rushell Clayton; Jamaica (JAM)	53.74 PB
3000 metres steeplechase	Beatrice Chepkoech; Kenya (KEN)	8:57.84 CR	Emma Coburn; United States (USA)	9:02.35 PB	Gesa Felicitas Krause; Germany (GER)	9:03.30 NR
20 kilometres walk	Liu Hong; China (CHN)	1:32.53	Qieyang Shijie; China (CHN)	1:33.10	Yang Liujing; China (CHN)	1:33.17
50 kilometres walk	Liang Rui; China (CHN)	4:23.26	Li Maocuo; China (CHN)	4:26.40	Eleonora Giorgi; Italy (ITA)	4:29.13
4 × 100 metres relay	Jamaica; Natalliah Whyte; Shelly-Ann Fraser-Pryce; Jonielle Smith; Shericka Jackson; Natasha Morrison*	41.44 WL	Great Britain; Asha Philip; Dina Asher-Smith; Ashleigh Nelson; Daryll Neita; Imani-Lara Lansiquot*	41.85 SB	United States; Dezerea Bryant; Teahna Daniels; Morolake Akinosun; Kiara Parker	42.10 SB
4 × 400 metres relay	United States; Phyllis Francis; Sydney McLaughlin; Dalilah Muhammad; Wadeline Jonathas; Jessica Beard*; Allyson Felix*; Kendall Ellis*; Courtney Okolo*	3:18.92 WL	Poland; Iga Baumgart-Witan; Patrycja Wyciszkiewicz; Małgorzata Hołub-Kowalik; Justyna Święty-Ersetic; Anna Kiełbasińska*	3:21.89 NR	Jamaica; Anastasia Le-Roy; Tiffany James; Stephenie Ann McPherson; Shericka Jackson; Roneisha McGregor*	3:22.37 SB
WR world record | AR area record | CR championship record | GR games record | NR national record | OR Olympic record | PB personal best | SB season best | WL world leading (in a given season)

* Indicates the athletes only competed in the preliminary heats and received medals.

==== Field ====
Chronology: 2015 | 2017 | 2019 | 2021 | 2023

Event	Gold		Silver		Bronze	
High jump	Mariya Lasitskene; Authorised Neutral Athletes (ANA)	2.04 m	Yaroslava Mahuchikh; Ukraine (UKR)	2.04 m WU20R	Vashti Cunningham; United States (USA)	2.00 m PB
Pole vault	Anzhelika Sidorova; Authorised Neutral Athletes (ANA)	4.95 m WL, PB	Sandi Morris; United States (USA)	4.90 m	Katerina Stefanidi; Greece (GRE)	4.85 m
Long jump	Malaika Mihambo; Germany (GER)	7.30 m WL, PB	Maryna Bekh-Romanchuk; Ukraine (UKR)	6.92 m SB	Ese Brume; Nigeria (NGR)	6.91 m
Triple jump	Yulimar Rojas; Venezuela (VEN)	15.37 m	Shanieka Ricketts; Jamaica (JAM)	14.92 m	Caterine Ibargüen; Colombia (COL)	14.73 m
Shot put	Gong Lijiao; China (CHN)	19.55 m	Danniel Thomas-Dodd; Jamaica (JAM)	19.47 m	Christina Schwanitz; Germany (GER)	19.17 m
Discus throw	Yaime Pérez; Cuba (CUB)	69.17 m	Denia Caballero; Cuba (CUB)	68.44 m	Sandra Perković; Croatia (CRO)	66.72 m
Hammer throw	DeAnna Price; United States (USA)	77.54 m	Joanna Fiodorow; Poland (POL)	76.35 m PB	Wang Zheng; China (CHN)	74.76 m
Javelin throw	Kelsey-Lee Barber; Australia (AUS)	66.56 m	Liu Shiying; China (CHN)	65.88 m SB	Lü Huihui; China (CHN)	65.49 m
WR world record | AR area record | CR championship record | GR games record | NR national record | OR Olympic record | PB personal best | SB season best | WL world leading (in a given season)

==== Combined ====
Chronology: 2015 | 2017 | 2019 | 2021 | 2023

Event	Gold		Silver		Bronze	
Heptathlon	Katarina Johnson-Thompson; Great Britain & N.I. (GBR)	6981 WL, NR	Nafissatou Thiam; Belgium (BEL)	6677	Verena Preiner; Austria (AUT)	6560
WR world record | AR area record | CR championship record | GR games record | NR national record | OR Olympic record | PB personal best | SB season best | WL world leading (in a given season)

=== Mixed ===
Event	Gold		Silver		Bronze	
4 × 400 metres relay	United States; Wilbert London; Allyson Felix; Courtney Okolo; Michael Cherry; Tyrell Richard*; Jessica Beard*; Jasmine Blocker*; Obi Igbokwe*	3:09.34 WR	Jamaica; Nathon Allen; Roneisha McGregor; Tiffany James; Javon Francis; Janieve Russell*	3:11.78 NR	Bahrain; Musa Isah; Aminat Jamal; Salwa Eid Naser; Abbas Abubakar Abbas	3:11.82 AR

* Indicates the athletes only competed in the preliminary heats and received medals.

== Event summaries ==
=== Sprints ===
In the men's 100 metres, the semi-finals were dominated by world leader Christian Coleman from the United States, finishing in 9.88 seconds while no other qualifiers broke 10 seconds. In the final, defending champion American Justin Gatlin got a good start to gain a step on the field, except Coleman got a better start, gaining that step on Gatlin and extending his lead to a dominating victory in 9.76 seconds, a new personal best and world-leading time for the season that becomes the 6th best in history, just 2 ticks behind Gatlin's best. Returning to form, Canada's Andre De Grasse closed and nearly caught Gatlin at the line in 9.90, a new wind-legal personal best, though he has run as fast as 9.69 wind-aided.

=== Long distance ===
The women's marathon began at midnight local time on 28 September with the temperature at 32 °C (90 °F) and 70 per cent humidity. By the end of the race, 28 of the 68 starters had dropped out, including all three Ethiopian runners. Five runners in a lead pack stayed together for the first 20 km (12 mi) and the pack was down to only four athletes by 35 km (22 mi), including Ruth Chepngetich and Edna Kiplagat of Kenya, Bahrain's Rose Chelimo and Namibia's Helalia Johannes. Chepngetich broke out into a sprint in the final lap to finish at 2:32:43, followed by Chelimo (2:33:46) and Johannes (2:35:15).

The women's 10,000 metres began the following night with Germany's Alina Reh taking an early lead before falling back and eventually dropping out. By the ninth lap, a lead pack of three Kenyans and three Ethiopians developed. By the half-way point, the Netherlands' Sifan Hassan had latched on to back of the lead pack, headed by Kenya's Rosemary Wanjiru and Agnes Tirop. Letesenbet Gidey of Ethiopia surged with four laps remaining with Hassan following close behind. Hassan took the lead on the final lap and finished in 30:17.33, more than three seconds ahead of Gidey, and almost eight seconds ahead of Tirop in third place.

=== Hurdles ===
In the men's 400 m hurdles, most of the top ranked athletes reached the final, though world number 4 Ludvy Vaillant was eliminated.

=== Jumps ===
The last place qualifier to the men's long jump final was Jamaica's Tajay Gayle with 7.89 m (25 ft 10 1/2 in). In the final on 28 September, Gayle jumped a personal best 8.46 m (27 ft 9 in) to take the lead in the first round. No other jumper would beat that mark. World leader Juan Miguel Echevarría from Cuba jumped 8.25 m (27 ft 3/4 in) while giving up the entire 20 cm (7.9 in) width of the board. His jump was bettered by American Jeff Henderson with an 8.28 m (27 ft 1 3/4 in) three jumpers later. In the third round, Echevarría improved to 8.34 m (27 ft 4 1/4 in) and Henderson responded again with 8.39 m (27 ft 6 1/4 in), which ultimately settled the medal positions. In the fourth round, Gayle improved his winning jump to 8.69 m (28 ft 6 in).

=== Throws ===
In the men's shot put, 4 men surpassed the previous Championship Record, with 22.53, a distance surpassing any winning mark in any global championship to this time, only falling in 4th. Joe Kovacs won with 22.91, silver went to Ryan Crouser with 22.90(22.71), and Tom Walsh took bronze with 22.90(22.56).With world record holder and defending champion Anita Włodarczyk absent from the women's hammer throw due to injury, world leader DeAnna Price seized the opportunity on the second throw of the competition with 76.87 m (252 ft 2 in), then a best of 77.54 m (254 ft 4 in) in the third round – no athlete could match her. The next thrower into the ring was Włodarczyk's Polish teammate Joanna Fiodorow, who threw her personal best 76.35 m (250 ft 5 in) to win the silver medal and drop Zalina Petrivskaya's first throw of the competition to third place after the first three throwers. Although Petrivskaya threw 74.33 m (243 ft 10 in) in the third round and maintained that position, China's Wang Zheng threw the hammer to 74.76 m (245 ft 3 in) to grab the bronze medal in the middle of the fifth round.

=== Walks ===
The men's 50 kilometres walk started at midnight local time on 29 September. Most walkers were wary of starting too fast; only the 20K world record holder, Japan's Yusuke Suzuki, went out fast, opening up a gap just a few minutes into the race. By 5K he had a 10-second lead over a chase pack and by 20K he had expanded the lead to two minutes. Suzuki crossed the halfway point at 2:01:07 and, by 35K, Suzuki had opened his lead up to 3:34. Suzuki first showed signs of cracking, stopping at the water station at 44K before getting back on stride. At that point he still had two minutes on China's Niu Wenbin, an additional minute on Portugal's João Vieira, with the next chaser Canada's Evan Dunfee another minute back, now ahead of China's Luo Yadong. Suzuki struggled through the final lap while Vieira and Dunfee were applying the pressure. Both passed Niu, with Dunfee closing down his gap to Vieira. Suzuki got across the finish line first, only 39 seconds ahead of Vieira, who held off Dunfee by only three seconds.

In its second appearance since the event's debut in 2017, the women's 50 kilometres walk began simultaneously with the men's. A lead quartet of China's Liang Rui and Li Maocuo with Italy's Eleonora Giorgi and Portugal's Inês Henriques crossed the 10K mark together, before Giorgi and Henriques dropped back. Liang continued to expand her lead with Li following comfortably ahead of Giorgi as the athletes reached 40K mark. Liang won the race in 4:23:26, more than three minutes ahead of her teammate Li, to become the first Chinese athlete to win the world title at that distance. Giorgi finished almost four minutes behind Li to win bronze.

== Daily highlights ==
=== Day one to three ===
One final was contested on the first day: Kenyan Ruth Chepngetich won the women's marathon in 2:32:43, beating the defending champion Rose Chelimo of Bahrain in the first ever World Championships race to start at midnight. Braima Sundar Dabo of Guinea Bissau won plaudits for assisting competitor Jonathan Busby of Aruba to the finish of the men's 5000 m heats. A record 17 athletes qualified for the women's pole vault final. Cuban Juan Miguel Echevarría's jump of 8.40 m (27 ft 6 1/2 in) was the best performance in men's long jump qualifying for ten years. Christian Coleman had the first sub-10 run of the championships in the men's 100 metres heats. Athletics Weekly noted the lack of spectators on the first day and the difficulty in travelling to the stadium, while decathlon World Champion Kevin Mayer was highly critical: "it's a disaster, there is no-one in the stands and the heat has not been adapted at all...We haven't really prioritised athletes when organising the championships here".

There were six finals on the second day of competition. DeAnna Price became the first American to win the women's hammer throw while Tajay Gayle became Jamaica's first men's long jump world champion, surprising the field by adding 37 centimetres to his personal best and improving to tenth on the all-time lists. Sifan Hassan broke the African dominance of the women's 10,000 metres that stretched back to 1997, by taking gold for the Netherlands. America's Christian Coleman won the men's 100 metres final in a time of 9.76 seconds. The qualifiers for the mixed 4 × 400 m relay resulted in the first world record of the championships, with the American quartet finishing in 3:12.42 minutes. Shelly-Ann Fraser-Pryce ran the fastest time ever recorded in the heats stage of the women's 100 metres with 10.80 seconds.

On the third day, five finals were scheduled. Shelly-Ann Fraser-Pryce won her fourth world title in the women's 100 m, recording her second fastest time ever (10.71) to hold off the British record-breaking Dina Asher-Smith. In the, Christian Taylor also won a fourth title in the men's triple jump, with compatriot Will Claye finishing runner-up as he had in 2017, and Hugues Fabrice Zango winning Burkina Faso's first ever World Championships medal in third. The mixed 4 × 400 m relay final brought another world record (3:09.34) and a twelfth gold medal for Allyson Felix, taking her ahead of Usain Bolt on the all-time medal tally. Poland drew interest in the mixed relay for its choice to place men on the two middle legs – the opposite of all the other teams. Anzhelika Sidorova won her first world title in the women's pole vault final, competing as an Authorised Neutral Athlete. Liu Hong was the last winner of the day, taking her third World Championships gold in the women's 20 km walk, where Qieyang Shenjie and Yang Liujing helped make it a medal sweep for the Chinese team. Liu, Felix and Fraser-Pryce all returned victorious to the World Championships after having had children in the previous two years, and in her post-race interview Fraser-Pryce said she hoped to inspire other women to start families and return to elite sport.

=== Day four to six ===
Day four featured six gold medal events. In men's discus throw Daniel Ståhl won Sweden's first gold medal in the event, while runner-up Fedrick Dacres won Jamaica's first discus medal and Lukas Weisshaidinger became Austria's first male World Championships medallist. Mariya Lasitskene defended her title in the women's high jump, winning on countback ahead of Yaroslava Mahuchikh, who set a world under-20 record of 2.04 m (6 ft 8 1/4 in). Sprint finishes from Muktar Edris and Selemon Barega made it an Ethiopian 1–2 in the men's 5000 metres final, where the early leader Jakob Ingebrigtsen collapsed over the line and missed a medal. Beatrice Chepkoech was dominant in the women's steeplechase, establishing a significant lead on her way to a championships record of 8:57.84 minutes. In her first global final, Halimah Nakaayi surprised with a Ugandan national record of 1:58.04 minutes to win the women's 800 metres. Karsten Warholm kept the men's 400 m hurdles final to the form book by retaining his world title, while Abderrahman Samba's bronze medal added the host nation Qatar to the medal table.

On the fifth day, the United States team won three of the four finals. Donavan Brazier broke records that had lasted over 30 years in the men's 800 metres final with a championship record and American record of 1:42.34 minutes. Silver medallist Amel Tuka gave Bosnia and Herzegovina's best ever performance of the championships. Noah Lyles had a clear victory in the men's 200 metres final. Sam Kendricks won the men's pole vault on countback in a closely fought final – the medallists Kendricks, Armand Duplantis and Piotr Lisek celebrated together on the landing mat with a synchronised backflip. The fourth gold medallist of the evening was Australia's Kelsey-Lee Barber, who surprised China's Liu Shiying and Lü Huihui by moving up from fourth to first place with her final throw of the competition. In qualifying Amalie Iuel set a Norwegian record as the second fastest qualifier in the women's 400 m hurdles, while Abdalelah Haroun of the host nation Qatar exited the men's 400 m in the first round.

There were three finals on the sixth day. Poland's Paweł Fajdek won a record fourth straight title in the men's hammer throw final, and officials played a role in the minor medals – fourth-placer Wojciech Nowicki was also awarded a bronze medal as irregularities with Bence Halász's bronze medal-winning throw was adjudged to have disadvantaged Nowicki, while Great Britain was unsuccessful in its appeal over Nick Miller's second round throw, which looked to be good enough for a silver medal but was judged a foul. In his international debut, Grant Holloway won the gold medal in the men's 110 metres hurdles final, where defending champion Omar McLeod collapsed after hitting several hurdles. McLeod crashed into Orlando Ortega impeding the Spaniard and although the Spanish team's appeal to have the race re-run was rejected, Ortega was instead awarded an additional bronze medal. Dina Asher-Smith won the women's 200 metres final by a large margin, becoming Britain's first global champion in the women's sprints with a British record time. In the first day of combined events, thirty points separated the top three in the men's decathlon (Damian Warner, Pierce LePage and Kevin Mayer) while in the women's heptathlon Katarina Johnson-Thompson set the fourth best ever day one score for a 96-point lead over defending champion Nafissatou Thiam.

=== Day seven to ten ===
The four finals of the seventh day centred around the conclusion of the combined events. Katarina Johnson-Thompson defeated Nafi Thiam in the heptathlon with a British record score of 6981 points, which moved her up to sixth on the all-time lists. The second day of the decathlon brought surprises as world record holder Kevin Mayer dropped out and Germany's Niklas Kaul set a championship decathlon best in the javelin to help him surge from eleventh place to the gold medal, making him the youngest winner of the title at age 21. The women's 400 metres final was among the fastest ever with five women under 50 seconds for the first time at the championships – 21-year-old Salwa Eid Naser of Bahrain seized the lead early on and crossed the line in 48.14 seconds for the third fastest time ever, leaving the Olympic champion Shaunae Miller-Uibo in second place with 48.37 seconds (becoming the sixth fastest athlete ever). China's Gong Lijiao defended her women's shot put title, reaching the podium for a sixth straight championships, while silver medallist Danniel Thomas-Dodd made history as Jamaica's first woman to win a global medal in the throws.

Among the six finals of the eighth day, the men's high jump final helped fill out the stadium for the first time as Qatari Mutaz Essa Barshim won a high quality contest for the host nation. Barshim, Mikhail Akimenko and Ilya Ivanyuk all cleared 2.35 m (7 ft 8 1/2 in) before the home athlete topped 2.37 m (7 ft 9 1/4 in) to win his country's first gold of the event. In the women's 400 metres hurdles final, Americans Dalilah Muhammad and Sydney McLaughlin turned the race into a duel which resulted in Olympic champion Muhammad setting a world record of 52.16 seconds to hold off 20-year-old McLaughlin, who ran the third fastest time ever. Ethiopian Lamecha Girma attempted to break Kenya's winning streak in the men's steeplechase final but was edged out on the line by Kenya's defending champion Conseslus Kipruto, with one hundredth of a second separating the two. Steven Gardiner of the Bahamas had a dominant run to win the men's 400 metres final, finishing over half a second ahead of the field and setting a Bahamian record of 43.48 seconds. Gardiner's presence was only possible due to a public fund-raising campaign for his national team, as Hurricane Dorian had devastated the Caribbean nation just one month earlier. The women's discus final was a Cuban affair between Yaime Pérez and Denia Caballero, with Pérez ultimately winning the gold with a fifth round effort of 69.17 m (226 ft 11 in). The first round of the men's and women's 4 × 100 metres relay saw athletes run an African record, a South American record and three national records. Toshikazu Yamanishi took the gold medal in the men's 20 km walk in the overnight session.

Six finals were scheduled for the ninth day. The men's shot put final saw four men surpass the previous championships record. Only one centimetre separated medallists Tom Walsh, Ryan Crouser, and Joe Kovacs, with Kovacs getting the win in 22.91 m (75 ft 1 3/4 in) – the best performance in nearly three decades. Yulimar Rojas was dominant in the women's triple jump final, taking the gold medal with a mark of 15.37 m (50 ft 5 in) – the fourth best jump ever. Sifan Hassan became the first woman to achieve a 1500/10,000 m double at the championships, and her winning time of 3:51.95 minutes was a championship and European record. Hassan gave an emotional post-race interview, defending herself against doping accusations which had arisen due to the four-year doping ban of her coach Alberto Salazar in the previous days. Hellen Obiri defended her title in the women's 5000 metres final and ran a championship record of 14:26.72 minutes in order to do so. The men's 4 × 100 metres relay final brought a slew of records with the United States winning with a national record time of 37.10 seconds (the third fastest ever) and Great Britain, Japan and Brazil setting continental area records for the next three places. Lelisa Desisa and Mosinet Geremew made it a 1–2 for Ethiopia in the late-night men's marathon, held in easier weather conditions than the women's race.

On the tenth and final day of the championships, seven finals were held. Malaika Mihambo of Germany won a clear gold in the women's long jump final by producing the twelfth best ever performance of 7.30 m (23 ft 11 1/4 in). In the men's 1500 metres final Kenya's Timothy Cheruiyot set a quick pace and surged at the end to take the gold medal. Joshua Cheptegei of Uganda held off Yomif Kejelcha in the men's 10,000 metres final to claim his second world of the year, having already topped the 2019 IAAF World Cross Country Championships podium. Anderson Peters of Grenada upset a field of more decorated European athletes in the men's javelin throw final as no one bettered his opening throw of 86.89 m (285 ft 3/4 in), while silver medallist Magnus Kirt of Estonia injured himself in the effort to beat his rival. Nia Ali of the United States surprised in the women's 100 metres hurdles final by winning gold in 12.34 seconds, making herself the ninth fastest of all-time and pushing the more favoured Danielle Williams and Kendra Harrison into the minor medals. The championships was brought to a close with the men's and women's 4 × 400 metres relay finals. The United States won both in world leading times to finish as the medal leader – its haul of 29 medals and 14 gold medals was almost three times that of second-placed Kenya (five golds and eleven medals). Jamaica ranked third on the medal table with three golds and twelve medals – its final bronze coming from the women's 4 × 400 metres relay after a successful appeal against an initial disqualification.

== Statistics ==
=== Medal table ===
* Host nation (Qatar)

Rank	Nation	Gold	Silver	Bronze	Total
1	United States	14	11	4	29
2	Kenya	5	2	4	11
3	Jamaica	3	5	4	12
4	China	3	3	3	9
5	Ethiopia	2	5	1	8
–	Authorised Neutral Athletes^{[1]}	2	3	1	6
6	Great Britain	2	3	0	5
7	Germany	2	0	4	6
8	Japan	2	0	1	3
9	Netherlands	2	0	0	2
9	Uganda	2	0	0	2
11	Poland	1	2	3	6
12	Bahrain	1	1	1	3
12	Cuba	1	1	1	3
12	Sweden	1	1	1	3
15	Bahamas	1	1	0	2
16	Qatar*	1	0	1	2
17	Australia	1	0	0	1
17	Grenada	1	0	0	1
17	Norway	1	0	0	1
17	Venezuela	1	0	0	1
21	Estonia	0	2	0	2
21	Ukraine	0	2	0	2
23	Canada	0	1	4	5
24	Belgium	0	1	1	2
24	Colombia	0	1	1	2
24	France	0	1	1	2
27	Algeria	0	1	0	1
27	Bosnia and Herzegovina	0	1	0	1
27	Portugal	0	1	0	1
30	Austria	0	0	2	2
31	Burkina Faso	0	0	1	1
31	Croatia	0	0	1	1
31	Ecuador	0	0	1	1
31	Greece	0	0	1	1
31	Hungary	0	0	1	1
31	Italy	0	0	1	1
31	Ivory Coast	0	0	1	1
31	Morocco	0	0	1	1
31	Namibia	0	0	1	1
31	New Zealand	0	0	1	1
31	Nigeria	0	0	1	1
31	Spain	0	0	1	1
31	Switzerland	0	0	1	1
Totals (43 entries)		49	49	51	149

^[1] IAAF does not include the medals won by athletes competing as Authorised Neutral Athletes in their official medal table.

=== Placing table ===
The Placing table assigns points to the top eight athletes in the final, with eight points to first place, seven to second place, and so on until one point for eighth place. Teams or athletes that do not finish or are disqualified do not receive points.

Source for the table: IAAF

Rank	Country	1st place, gold medalist(s)	2nd place, silver medalist(s)	3rd place, bronze medalist(s)	4	5	6	7	8	Pts
1	United States	14	11	4	7	6	4	9	8	310
2	Kenya	5	2	4	3	3	3	3	2	122
3	Jamaica	3	5	4	3	1	3	1	2	115
4	China	3	3	3	2	4	2	1	2	99
5	Ethiopia	2	5	1	3	1	2	0	1	83
6	Great Britain & N.I.	2	3	0	5	2	2	3	0	82
7	Germany	2	0	4	3	1	2	1	2	69
8	Poland	1	2	3	0	2	1	2	1	56
9	Canada	0	1	4	0	2	3	2	3	55
10	Ukraine	0	2	0	2	3	2	1	0	44
11	Japan	2	0	1	0	0	2	2	1	33
12	Cuba	1	1	1	0	2	0	0	1	30
12	Netherlands	2	0	0	0	0	2	4	0	30
14	Bahrain	1	1	1	1	0	0	1	0	28
15	Belarus	0	0	0	1	2	3	1	1	25
15	Brazil	0	0	0	3	1	1	1	1	25
15	France	0	1	1	0	1	2	1	0	25
15	Sweden	1	1	1	0	0	1	0	1	25
15	Uganda	2	0	0	1	1	0	0	0	25
20	Colombia	0	1	1	1	1	0	0	0	22
20	South Africa	0	0	0	2	3	0	0	0	22
22	Belgium	0	1	1	0	1	1	0	0	20
22	Norway	1	0	0	1	1	1	0	0	20
24	Spain	0	0	1	0	0	2	2	3	19
25	Estonia	0	2	0	0	0	1	0	0	17
26	Bahamas	1	1	0	0	0	0	0	1	16
26	Italy	0	0	1	0	0	1	2	3	16
26	Switzerland	0	0	1	2	0	0	0	0	16
29	Australia	1	0	0	0	0	2	0	0	14
29	Qatar	1	0	1	0	0	0	0	0	14
31	Portugal	0	1	0	1	0	0	0	1	13
32	Austria	0	0	2	0	0	0	0	0	12
32	Grenada	1	0	0	0	1	0	0	0	12
32	Nigeria	0	0	1	1	0	0	0	1	12
35	Turkey	0	0	0	0	2	1	0	0	11
36	Ivory Coast	0	0	1	0	1	0	0	0	10
36	Croatia	0	0	1	0	0	0	2	0	10
36	Hungary	0	0	1	0	1	0	0	0	10
36	Trinidad and Tobago	0	0	0	0	1	1	1	1	10
36	Venezuela	1	0	0	0	0	0	1	0	10
41	Morocco	0	0	1	0	0	0	1	1	9
42	Algeria	0	1	0	0	0	0	0	1	8
42	Czech Republic	0	0	0	0	2	0	0	0	8
42	Ecuador	0	0	1	0	0	0	1	0	8
42	New Zealand	0	0	1	0	0	0	1	0	8
42	Romania	0	0	0	1	0	1	0	0	8
47	Bosnia and Herzegovina	0	1	0	0	0	0	0	0	7
48	Burkina Faso	0	0	1	0	0	0	0	0	6
48	Greece	0	0	1	0	0	0	0	0	6
48	Namibia	0	0	1	0	0	0	0	0	6
51	Cyprus	0	0	0	0	1	0	0	1	5
51	Finland	0	0	0	1	0	0	0	0	5
51	British Virgin Islands	0	0	0	1	0	0	0	0	5
51	Moldova	0	0	0	1	0	0	0	0	5
55	Azerbaijan	0	0	0	0	0	0	2	0	4
55	Costa Rica	0	0	0	0	1	0	0	0	4
55	Puerto Rico	0	0	0	0	1	0	0	0	4
58	Barbados	0	0	0	0	0	1	0	0	3
58	Eritrea	0	0	0	0	0	1	0	0	3
58	Gambia	0	0	0	0	0	1	0	0	3
58	India	0	0	0	0	0	0	1	1	3
58	Ireland	0	0	0	0	0	1	0	0	3
63	Bulgaria	0	0	0	0	0	0	1	0	2
63	Denmark	0	0	0	0	0	0	1	0	2
63	Iran	0	0	0	0	0	0	1	0	2
66	Benin	0	0	0	0	0	0	0	1	1
66	Malaysia	0	0	0	0	0	0	0	1	1
66	North Korea	0	0	0	0	0	0	0	1	1

=== Records ===
At the 2019 World Athletics Championships, three world records, one world under-20 record, six championships records, 21 area records and 86 national records in athletics were set. Furthermore, two championship combined event bests were set and 23 world-leading performances (WL) were achieved at the competition.

Allyson Felix became the most decorated athlete in World Championships, reaching a career total of 13 gold medals through wins in the women's and the mixed 4 × 400 metres relays.

Source for the records tables: IAAF

==== Individual ====
Sex	Event	Athlete	Country	Result	Record	Date
Men	100 metres	Stern Noel Liffa	Malawi	10.72	NR	27 September 2019
Men	100 metres	Dinesh Kumar Dhakal	Bhutan	11.64	NR	27 September 2019
Women	3000 metres steeplechase	Anna Emilie Møller	Denmark	9:18.92	NR	27 September 2019
Men	400 metres hurdles	Andrea Ercolani Volta	San Marino	52.60	NR	27 September 2019
Women	100 metres	Sarswati Chaudhary	Nepal	12.72	NR	28 September 2019
Men	400 metres hurdles	Abdelmalik Lahoulou	Algeria	48.39	NR	28 September 2019
Men	Long jump	Tajay Gayle	Jamaica	8.69	NR, Commonwealth	28 September 2019
Men	Triple jump	Hugues Fabrice Zango	Burkina Faso	17.66	AR	29 September 2019
Women	100 metres	Dina Asher-Smith	Great Britain & N.I.	10.83	NR	29 September 2019
Men	200 metres	Noureddine Hadid	Lebanon	20.84	NR	29 September 2019
Men	200 metres	Ahmed Al-Yaari	Yemen	22.37	NR	29 September 2019
Women	3000 metres steeplechase	Gesa Felicitas Krause	Germany	9:03.30	NR	30 September 2019
Women	3000 metres steeplechase	Anna Emilie Møller	Denmark	9:13.46	NR	30 September 2019
Women	3000 metres steeplechase	Luiza Gega	Albania	9:19.93	NR	30 September 2019
Men	Discus throw	Apostolos Parellis	Cyprus	66.32	NR	30 September 2019
Women	Javelin throw	Annu Rani	India	62.43	NR	30 September 2019
Women	200 meters	Aminatou Seyni	Niger	22.58	NR	30 September 2019
Men	800 meters	Donavan Brazier	United States	1:42.34	AR	1 October 2019
Men	400 metres	Jessy Franco	Gibraltar	47.41	NR	1 October 2019
Men	400 metres	Todiasoa Rabearison	Madagascar	46.80	NR	1 October 2019
Women	400 metres hurdles	Amalie Iuel	Norway	54.72	NR	1 October 2019
Men	3000 metres steeplechase	Avinash Sable	India	8:25.23	NR	1 October 2019
Women	400 metres hurdles	Sage Watson	Canada	54.32	NR	2 October 2019
Men	400 metres	Anthony Zambrano	Colombia	44.55	NR	2 October 2019
Women	200 metres	Dina Asher-Smith	Great Britain & N.I.	21.88	NR	2 October 2019
Women	400 metres	Salwa Eid Naser	Bahrain	48.14	AR	3 October 2019
Women	400 metres	Shaunae Miller-Uibo	Bahamas	48.37	AR, Commonwealth	3 October 2019
Women	Hepthatlon	Odile Ahouanwanou	Benin	6210	NR	4 October 2019
Women	Hepthatlon	Katarina Johnson-Thompson	Great Britain & N.I.	6981	NR	4 October 2019
Women	400 metres hurdles	Dalilah Muhammad	United States	52.16	WR	4 October 2019
Men	400 metres	Steven Gardiner	Bahamas	43.48	NR	4 October 2019
Men	400 metres	Anthony Zambrano	Colombia	44.15	AR	4 October 2019
Women	100 metres hurdles	Marthe Koala	Burkina Faso	52.16	NR	2 October 2019
Men	3000 metres steeplechase	Lamecha Girma	Ethiopia	8:01.36	NR	4 October 2019
Men	3000 metres steeplechase	Avinash Sable	India	8:21.37	NR	4 October 2019
Men	Shot put	Tommy Walsh	New Zealand	22.90	AR, Commonwealth	5 October 2019
Women	100 metres hurdles	Andrea Carolina Vargas	Costa Rica	12.68	NR	5 October 2019
Women	100 metres hurdles	Andrea Carolina Vargas	Costa Rica	12.65	NR	6 October 2019
Women	100 metres hurdles	Andrea Carolina Vargas	Costa Rica	12.64	NR	6 October 2019
Men	Javelin throw	Norbert Rivasz-Tóth	Hungary	83.42	NR	5 October 2019
Men	Javelin throw	Arshad Nadeem	Pakistan	81.52	NR	5 October 2019
Women	1500 meters	Sifan Hassan	Netherlands	3:51.95	AR	5 October 2019
Women	1500 meters	Faith Kipyegon	Kenya	3:54.22	NR	5 October 2019
Women	1500 meters	Shelby Houlihan	United States	3:54.99	AR	5 October 2019

==== Relay ====
Sex	Event	Athlete	Country	Result	Record	Date
Mixed	4 × 400 metres relay	Tyrell Richard; Jessica Beard; Jasmine Blocker; Obi Igbokwe	United States	3:12.42	WR	28 September 2019
Mixed	4 × 400 metres relay	Nathon Allen; Janieve Russell; Roneisha McGregor; Javon Francis	Jamaica	3:12.73	NR	28 September 2019
Mixed	4 × 400 metres relay	Musa Isah; Aminat Jamal; Salwa Eid Naser; Abbas Abubakar Abbas	Bahrain	3:12.74	AR	28 September 2019
Mixed	4 × 400 metres relay	Rabah Yousif; Zoey Clark; Emily Diamond; Martyn Rooney	Great Britain & N.I.	3:12.80	AR	28 September 2019
Mixed	4 × 400 metres relay	Austin Cole; Aiyanna-Brigitte Stiverne; Madeline Price; Philip Osei	Canada	3:16.76	NR	28 September 2019
Mixed	4 × 400 metres relay	Mame-Ibra Anne; Amandine Brossier; Agnès Raharolahy; Thomas Jordier	France	3:17.17	NR	28 September 2019
Mixed	4 × 400 metres relay	Anderson Henriques; Tiffani Marinho; Geisa Coutinho; Lucas Carvalho	Brazil	3:16.12	AR	28 September 2019
Mixed	4 × 400 metres relay	Robin Vanderbemden; Camille Laus; Imke Vervaet; Dylan Borlée	Belgium	3:16.16	NR	28 September 2019
Mixed	4 × 400 metres relay	Seika Aoyama; Kota Wakabayashi; Tomoya Tamura; Saki Takashima	Japan	3:17.17	NR	28 September 2019
Mixed	4 × 400 metres relay	Wil London; Allyson Felix; Courtney Okolo; Michael Cherry	United States	3:09.34	WR	29 September 2019
Mixed	4 × 400 metres relay	Nathon Allen; Roneisha McGregor; Tiffany James; Javon Francis	Jamaica	3:11.78	NR	29 September 2019
Mixed	4 × 400 metres relay	Musa Isah; Aminat Jamal; Salwa Eid Naser; Abbas Abubakar Abbas	Bahrain	3:11.82	AR	29 September 2019
Mixed	4 × 400 metres relay	Rabah Yousif; Zoey Clark; Emily Diamond; Martyn Rooney	Great Britain & N.I.	3:12.27	AR	29 September 2019
Mixed	4 × 400 metres relay	Wiktor Suwara; Rafał Omelko; Iga Baumgart-Witan; Justyna Święty-Ersetic	Poland	3:12.33	NR	29 September 2019
Mixed	4 × 400 metres relay	Dylan Borlée; Hanne Claes; Camille Laus; Kevin Borlée	Belgium	3:14.33	NR	29 September 2019
Women	4 × 100 metres relay	Johanelis Herrera Abreu; Gloria Hooper; Anna Bongiorni; Irene Siragusa	Italy	42.90	NR	4 October 2019
Men	4 × 100 metres relay	Rodrigo do Nascimento; Vitor Hugo dos Santos; Derick Silva; Paulo André de Oliveira	Brazil	37.90	AR	4 October 2019
Men	4 × 100 metres relay	Federico Cattaneo; Marcell Jacobs; Davide Manenti; Filippo Tortu	Italy	38.11	NR	4 October 2019
Men	4 × 100 metres relay	Thando Dlodlo; Simon Magakwe; Clarence Munyai; Akani Simbine	South Africa	37.65	AR	4 October 2019
Men	4 × 100 metres relay	Su Bingtian; Xu Zhouzheng; Wu Zhiqiang; Xie Zhenye	China	37.79	AR	4 October 2019
Men	4 × 100 metres relay	Joris van Gool; Taymir Burnet; Hensley Paulina; Churandy Martina	Netherlands	37.91	NR	4 October 2019
Women	4 × 400 metres relay	Hanne Claes; Imke Vervaet; Paulien Couckuyt; Camille Laus	Belgium	3:26.58	NR	5 October 2019
Men	4 × 400 metres relay	Jhon Perlaza; Diego Palomeque; Jhon Solís; Anthony Zambrano	Colombia	3:01.06	NR	5 October 2019
Women	4 × 100 metres relay	Ajla Del Ponte; Sarah Atcho; Mujinga Kambundji; Salomé Kora	Switzerland	42.18	NR	5 October 2019
Men	4 × 100 metres relay	Christian Coleman; Justin Gatlin; Michael Rodgers; Noah Lyles	United States	37.10	NR	5 October 2019
Men	4 × 100 metres relay	Adam Gemili; Zharnel Hughes; Richard Kilty; Nethaneel Mitchell-Blake	Great Britain & N.I.	37.36	AR	5 October 2019
Men	4 × 100 metres relay	Shuhei Tada; Kirara Shiraishi; Yoshihide Kiryu; Abdul Hakim Sani Brown	Japan	37.43	AR	5 October 2019
Men	4 × 100 metres relay	Rodrigo do Nascimento; Vitor Hugo dos Santos; Derick Silva; Paulo André de Oliveira	Brazil	37.72	AR	5 October 2019

== Participants ==
205 out of the 214 member federations of the IAAF participated in the Championships, as well as an Athlete Refugee Team, for a total of 1,772 athletes out of 1,972 originally entered. Due to the IAAF suspension of the Russian Athletics Federation, confirmed on 23 September by the IAAF Council, Russian athletes competed as Authorised Neutral Athletes. A total of 101 federations entered one athlete only (25 of those athletes were women). IAAF members Libya, Liechtenstein, Montserrat, Norfolk Island, and Tuvalu did not enter any athletes, while the Central African Republic, Dominica, Sudan, and the United Arab Emirates originally entered athletes but those did not start for various reasons.

The gender split between the preliminary entrants was 53% male and 47% female, and IAAF President Sebastian Coe noted after a meeting with the executive board of the International Olympic Committee that the organisation was looking to extend gender equality to its governing structures also.

- Afghanistan (1)
- Albania (1)
- Algeria (6)
- American Samoa (1)
- Andorra (1)
- Angola (1)
- Anguilla (1)
- Antigua and Barbuda (1)
- Argentina (3)
- Armenia (1)
- Aruba (1)
- Athlete Refugee Team (6)
- Australia (57)
- Austria (6)
- Authorised Neutral Athletes (29)
- Azerbaijan (4)
- Bahamas (9)
- Bahrain (14)
- Bangladesh (1)
- Barbados (4)
- Belarus (30)
- Belgium (26)
- Belize (1)
- Benin (2)
- Bermuda (1)
- Bhutan (1)
- Bolivia (1)
- Bosnia and Herzegovina (3)
- Botswana (6)
- Brazil (40)
- British Virgin Islands (3)
- Brunei (1)
- Bulgaria (7)
- Burkina Faso (3)
- Burundi (4)
- Cambodia (1)
- Cameroon (1)
- Canada (45)
- Cape Verde (1)
- Cayman Islands (1)
- Chad (1)
- Chile (2)
- China (59)
- Chinese Taipei (5)
- Colombia (15)
- Comoros (1)
- Congo (2)
- Cook Islands (1)
- Costa Rica (4)
- Croatia (8)
- Cuba (17)
- Cyprus (5)
- Czech Republic (22)
- DR Congo (1)
- Denmark (7)
- Djibouti (4)
- Dominican Republic (2)
- Timor-Leste (1)
- Ecuador (12)
- Egypt (5)
- Equatorial Guinea (1)
- Eritrea (6)
- Estonia (8)
- Eswatini (2)
- Ethiopia (33)
- Federated States of Micronesia (1)
- Fiji (1)
- Finland (21)
- France (60)
- French Polynesia (1)
- Gabon (1)
- Gambia (2)
- Georgia (1)
- Germany (65)
- Ghana (8)
- Gibraltar (1)
- Great Britain & N.I. (65)
- Greece (16)
- Grenada (3)
- Guam (1)
- Guatemala (5)
- Guinea (1)
- Guinea-Bissau (1)
- Guyana (3)
- Haiti (2)
- Honduras (1)
- Hong Kong (1)
- Hungary (16)
- Iceland (1)
- India (23)
- Indonesia (2)
- Iran (3)
- Iraq (1)
- Ireland (8)
- Israel (3)
- Italy (56)
- Ivory Coast (3)
- Jamaica (51)
- Japan (53)
- Jordan (1)
- Kazakhstan (8)
- Kenya (45)
- Kiribati (1)
- Kosovo (1)
- Kuwait (2)
- Kyrgyzstan (2)
- Laos (1)
- Latvia (12)
- Lebanon (1)
- Lesotho (1)
- Liberia (1)
- Lithuania (11)
- Luxembourg (1)
- Macau (1)
- Madagascar (1)
- Malawi (1)
- Malaysia (1)
- Maldives (1)
- Mali (1)
- Malta (1)
- Marshall Islands (1)
- Mauritania (1)
- Mauritius (1)
- Mexico (11)
- Moldova (4)
- Monaco (1)
- Mongolia (4)
- Montenegro (2)
- Morocco (16)
- Mozambique (1)
- Myanmar (1)
- Namibia (2)
- Nauru (1)
- Nepal (1)
- Netherlands (27)
- New Zealand (13)
- Nicaragua (1)
- Niger (2)
- Nigeria (22)
- North Korea (1)
- North Macedonia (1)
- Northern Mariana Islands (1)
- Norway (17)
- Oman (1)
- Pakistan (1)
- Palau (1)
- Palestine (1)
- Panama (1)
- Papua New Guinea (1)
- Paraguay (1)
- Peru (3)
- Philippines (1)
- Poland (41)
- Portugal (15)
- Puerto Rico (4)
- Qatar (15) (hosts)
- Romania (10)
- Rwanda (2)
- Saint Kitts and Nevis (1)
- Saint Lucia (2)
- Saint Vincent and the Grenadines (1)
- El Salvador (1)
- Samoa (2)
- San Marino (1)
- São Tomé and Príncipe (1)
- Saudi Arabia (3)
- Senegal (1)
- Serbia (3)
- Seychelles (1)
- Sierra Leone (1)
- Singapore (1)
- Slovakia (6)
- Slovenia (9)
- Solomon Islands (1)
- Somalia (1)
- South Africa (27)
- South Korea (4)
- South Sudan (1)
- Spain (37)
- Sri Lanka (1)
- Suriname (1)
- Sweden (23)
- Switzerland (18)
- Syria (1)
- Tajikistan (1)
- Tanzania (4)
- Thailand (1)
- Togo (1)
- Tonga (1)
- Trinidad and Tobago (14)
- Tunisia (5)
- Turkey (18)
- Turkmenistan (1)
- Turks and Caicos Islands (1)
- Uganda (21)
- Ukraine (40)
- United States (144)
- U.S. Virgin Islands (1)
- Uruguay (4)
- Uzbekistan (6)
- Vanuatu (1)
- Venezuela (8)
- Vietnam (1)
- Yemen (1)
- Zambia (2)
- Zimbabwe (5)

=== Absences ===
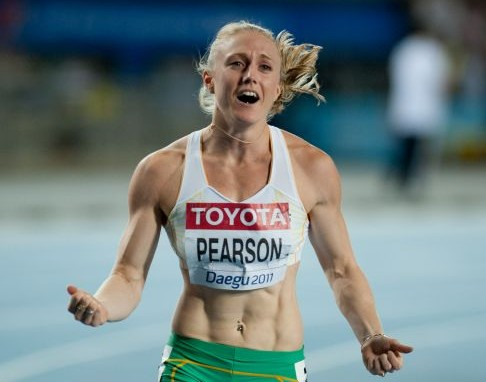
World champion Sally Pearson announced her retirement in August before the World Championships

Several prominent athletes were absent from the competition. The reigning women's 100 metres hurdles world champion Sally Pearson announced her retirement one month before the championships. Several reigning world champions could not attempt to defend their global titles due to injury, including Anita Włodarczyk (women's hammer throw), Wayde van Niekerk (men's 400 m), Ivana Španović (women's long jump), Elijah Manangoi (men's 1500 m), and Éider Arévalo (men's 20 km walk).

Among other high-profile injury withdrawals were women's 1500 m world record holder Genzebe Dibaba, 10,000 m world record holder Almaz Ayana, two-time shot put world champion David Storl, Olympic women's pole vault medallist Eliza McCartney, 2017 world sprint hurdles medallist Pamela Dutkiewicz, world champion in the relay Chijindu Ujah, world decathlon runner-up Rico Freimuth, and former European champions Arthur Abele, Mahiedine Mekhissi-Benabbad, Timur Morgunov, and Morhad Amdouni. World medallist Eilidh Doyle was absent due to pregnancy.

The following athletes were also absent due to injury:

- Lisa Mayer, German relay sprinter
- Laura Müller, German relay sprinter
- Cynthia Bolingo, Belgian sprinter (Achilles tendon)
- Jonathan Borlée, Belgian sprinter
- Marie-Laurence Jungfleisch, German high jumper (foot injury)
- Giorgio Rubino, Italian racewalker
- Gregor Traber, German hurdler (back injury)
- Sofia Ennaoui, Polish 1500 m runner
- Hima Das, Indian 400 m runner (back injury)
- Laura Ikauniece, Latvian heptathlete

=== Testosterone rule ===
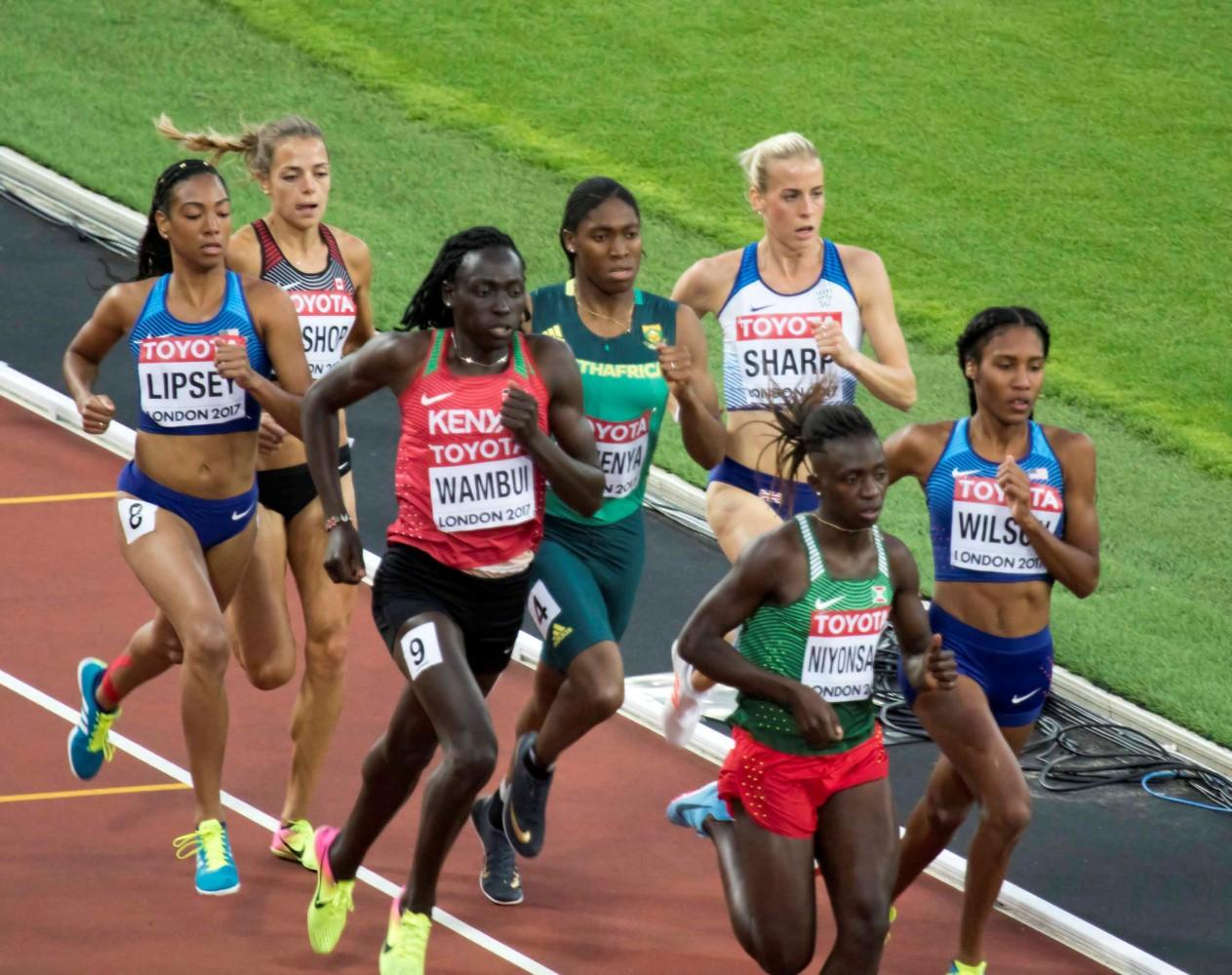
The 2017 World Championship women's 800 m final, with excluded athletes Margaret Wambui, Caster Semenya, and Francine Niyonsaba

The three 2016 Olympic medallists in the women's 800 metres were all excluded from the 2019 World Athletics Championships under the IAAF's testosterone rules. Caster Semenya, Francine Niyonsaba and Margaret Wambui all acknowledged they had a difference in sex development (DSD) which resulted in their bodies producing levels of testosterone above the limits set by the IAAF for women's competition. The IAAF rules stipulate such athletes must take testosterone-reducing medication in order to compete in women's races. Caster Semenya's appeal to the Court of Arbitration for Sport (CAS) against this rule was ongoing at the time of the World Championships. All three athletes declined to adhere to the IAAF's ruling and thus could not compete. CAS had previously made a decision in May 2019 to uphold the IAAF's rules on the grounds that they were discriminatory to athletes with a DSD, but that discriminatory action was "a necessary, reasonable and proportionate means of achieving the legitimate objective of ensuring fair competition in female athletics". Kenyan athletes, 800 m national champion Jackline Wambui and Linda Kageha, who was in the mixed relay team, were excluded from selection for Kenya as they refused to submit to a testosterone test. Because of the testosterone rule, 400 metres world No. 3 Aminatou Seyni competed in the women's 200 metres instead of women's 400 metres.

== Anti-doping ==
Working alongside the Local Organising Committee and the Qatar Anti-Doping Commission, the IAAF's Athletics Integrity Unit oversaw an anti-doping programme at the World Championships for the second time, having been created two years earlier. The 2019 World Championships was the first in which national federations were obligated to ensure all athletes they selected had been subject to three out-of-competition tests and one in-competition test prior to the competition. This rule resulted in the exclusion of two Kenyan runners, Michael Kibet and Daniel Simiyu, who had not failed a test but had not been tested sufficiently before Doha. At the host venue, around 700 athletes' blood samples were collected as part of the biological passport scheme designed to identify the use of steroids, EPO or human growth hormone. A further 500 in-competition tests are due to take place, mostly urine-based. Samples taken at the World Championships will be transferred to a World Anti-Doping Agency-accredited laboratory outside of the host country, in order to remove conflicts of interest that had affected prior events. In collaboration with the IAAF Athletes' Commission, an athlete education and support site was set up in Doha: the Athletics Integrity Hub. The hub provided information on anti-doping and also support for reporting of illegal gambling, bribery and corruption, harassment and abuse.

The Russian Athletics Federation was excluded from the World Championships for a second time running as it remained suspended by the IAAF due to systemic doping. The Russian Federation had failed to gain reinstatement that year because tests from the Russian Anti-Doping Agency's Moscow laboratory indicated evidence of manipulation. Russian athletes had to apply to the IAAF to compete under the Authorised Neutral Athlete scheme. Although not nationally suspended, Kenya came under scrutiny for a culture of doping, with Brett Clothier of the Athletics Integrity Unit stating that "EPO is readily available and everyone knows where to get it and how to use it" in a documentary released by German broadcaster ZDF shortly before the World Championships.

The world leader in the men's 100 metres, Christian Coleman, was suspended by the United States Anti-Doping Agency (USADA) after missing three out-of-competition tests within a 12-month period, but successfully appealed a ban on a technicality of the test dates and gained entry to the competition. During the championships, the USADA issued a four-year ban for doping violations to Alberto Salazar, head coach of the Nike Oregon Project – a training group that included several athletes who would go on to medal at the championships.

Dilshod Nazarov, the reigning Olympic champion in the men's hammer throw and also president of the Tajikistan Athletics Federation, was banned shortly before the competition, after retesting of a sample from the 2011 World Championships in Athletics showed metabolites of Turinabol. Other athletes suspended on anti-doping grounds shortly before the championships were the 2015 women's 800 m world champion Maryna Arzamasova, 2019 Pan American Games women's discus silver medallist Andressa de Morais, the 2018 Commonwealth Games women's 100 m champion Michelle-Lee Ahye, African sprint medallist Carina Horn and Asian long-distance medallist Albert Rop.

Due to the re-analysis of samples taken from previous championships, 13 current and former athletes received their world championship medals during the championships. Marija Šestak received her triple jump bronze medal from the 2007 World Championships. Oleksiy Kasyanov, Antonietta Di Martino and Naide Gomes received their bronze medals from the 2009 World Championships. Habiba Ghribi received her 3000-meter steeplechase gold medal from the 2011 World Championships. Race walkers Jared Tallent and Kim Hyun-sub collected their silver and bronze medals respectively, whilst the 2019 world champion Gong Lijiao received her shot put bronze medal and javelin thrower Sunette Viljoen received her silver medal. 800 meter runners Janeth Jepkosgei and Alysia Montaño collected their silver and bronze medals. Montano also collected her bronze medal from the 2013 World Championships as her teammate Brenda Martinez collected the silver. Hammer thrower Anita Włodarczyk also collected her gold medal from the 2013 championships.

== Media coverage ==
The IAAF agreed broadcasting agreements with 160 territories, with remaining areas receiving coverage direct from the IAAF via the organisation's official YouTube channel.

=== International broadcasters ===
- Abu Dhabi Sports: Bahrain, Iran, Iraq, Kuwait, Lebanon, Oman, Palestine, Qatar, Saudi Arabia, Syria, United Arab Emirates, Yemen
- Abu Dhabi Sports (cable and satellite): Algeria, Chad, Djibouti, Egypt, Jordan, Libya, Mauritania, Morocco, Somalia, Sudan, Tunisia
- Arena Sport: Bosnia and Herzegovina, Croatia, Kosovo, Macedonia, Montenegro, Serbia, Slovenia
- ESPN International (highlights): Anguilla, Antigua, Argentina, Aruba, Bahamas, Barbados, Barbuda, Bermuda, Bolivia, Bonaire, Cayman Islands, Chile, Colombia, Costa Rica, Curaçao, Dominica, Dominican Republic, Ecuador, El Salvador, Falkland Islands, French Guiana, Grenada, Guadeloupe, Guatemala, Haiti, Honduras, Jamaica, Martinique, Mexico, Montserrat, Nicaragua, Panama, Paraguay, Peru, Saint Barthélemy, St. Kitts and Nevis, St. Lucia, St. Maarten, Trinidad and Tobago, Turks and Caicos Islands, Uruguay, Venezuela
- Eurosport Australia: Australia, Antarctica (Australian Antarctic Territory), Christmas Island, Cocos (Keeling) Islands, Heard Island, McDonald Islands, Norfolk Island
- Galaxia SM: North Korea, South Korea
- NBCUniversal and NBC: Puerto Rico, US Virgin Islands, United States
- Pan Sub-Saharan Africa Supersport: Angola, Benin, Botswana, Burkina Faso, Burundi, Cameroon, Cape Verde, Central African Republic, Chad, Comoros, Congo Democratic Republic, Congo Republic, Djibouti, Equatorial Guinea, Eritrea, Ethiopia, Gabon, Gambia, Ghana, Guinea, Guinea Bissau, Ivory Coast, Kenya, Lesotho, Liberia, Madagascar, Malawi, Mali, Mauritania, Mauritius, Mayotte, Mozambique, Namibia, Niger, Nigeria, Reunion, Rwanda, São Tomé and Príncipe, Senegal, Seychelles, Sierra Leone, St. Helena, Somalia, South Africa, South Sudan, Sudan, Swaziland, Tanzania, Togo, Uganda, Western Sahara, Zambia, Zimbabwe
- STAR Sports India: Bangladesh, Bhutan, India, Maldives, Nepal, Pakistan, Sri Lanka
- Television Jamaica: Anguilla, Belize, Bermuda, British Virgin Islands, Dominica, Guyana, Jamaica, Montserrat, St. Maarten, St. Martin, St. Vincent and the Grenadines, Suriname, Trinidad and Tobago, Turks and Caicos Islands
- TyC Sports: Argentina, Bolivia, Chile, Colombia, Costa Rica, Ecuador, El Salvador, Guatemala, Honduras, Nicaragua, Panama, Paraguay, Peru, Uruguay, Venezuela

Source: IAAF

=== National broadcasters ===
- Algeria: EPTV
- Antigua and Barbuda: ABS
- Austria: ORF
- Bahamas: ZNS
- Barbados: CBC
- Belgium: RTBF, VRT
- Benin: ORTB
- Botswana: BTV
- Brazil: Grupo Globo
- Brunei: ASTRO
- Bulgaria: BNT 3
- Burkina Faso: RTBF
- Cameroon: CRTV
- Canada: CBC
- Cayman Islands: TVJi
- Chile: Canal 13
- China: CCTV
- Colombia: Caracol TV
- Congo Democratic Republic: RTNC
- Costa Rica: Tigo Sports, Spring Media
- Croatia: HRT
- Cuba: ICRT
- Czech Republic: CT
- Denmark: TV2
- Estonia: ERR
- Ethiopia: EBC
- Finland: YLE
- France: France Télévisions
- Germany: ARD, ZDF
- Ghana: GTV
- Greece: ERT
- Grenada: GBS
- Hungary: MTV
- Iceland: RUV
- Israel: The Sports Channel
- Italy: RAI
- Japan: TBS
- Latvia: LT
- Lithuania: LRT
- Malaysia: ASTRO
- Mali: ORTM
- Mauritius: MBC
- Mexico: Televisa
- Mozambique: TVM
- Netherlands: NOS
- New Zealand: Sky Network NZ
- Norway: NRK
- Panama: Cable Onda
- Poland: TVP, Eurosport Poland
- Portugal: RTP
- Qatar: Al Kass Extra One
- Russia: MatchTV
- Rwanda: RTVS
- Senegal: RTS
- Seychelles: SBC
- Slovakia: RTVS
- Slovenia: TV SLO
- Spain: TVE
- St. Kitts and Nevis: ZIZ
- St. Lucia: Winners TV
- Sweden: SVT
- Switzerland: SRG
- Taiwan: Eleven Sports, Videoland
- Turkey: TRT
- United Kingdom: BBC
- Uruguay: VTV
- Venezuela: Meridiano

Source: IAAF

== See also ==
- 2019 World Para Athletics Championships
