= Zimbabwe at the World Athletics Championships =

- Flag of Zimbabwe
- WA code: ZIM
- Medals: Gold 0 Silver 0 Bronze 1 Total 1

World Athletics Championships appearances (overview)
- 1983; 1987; 1991; 1993; 1995; 1997; 1999; 2001; 2003; 2005; 2007; 2009; 2011; 2013; 2015; 2017; 2019; 2022; 2023; 2025

Zimbabwe has participated in all editions of the World Athletics Championships and has won its first and only medal at international competitions in 2011 when Ngonidzashe Makusha took 3rd place in the men's long jump at the 2011 World Athletics Championships. Since then, zimbabwean athletes have qualified for finals, without stepping on the podium.

== Medalists ==
Medal	Name	Year	Event
Bronze	Ngonidzashe Makusha	2011 Daegu	Men's long jump

=== By event ===
Event	Gold	Silver	Bronze	Total
Long jump	0	0	1	1
Totals (1 entries)	0	0	1	1

=== By gender ===
Gender	Gold	Silver	Bronze	Total
Men	0	0	1	1
Women	0	0	0	0

== See also ==
- Zimbabwe at the Olympics
- Zimbabwe at the Paralympics
