= Tanzania at the 2025 World Athletics Championships =

- Flag of Tanzania
- WA code: TAN

in Tokyo, Japan 13 September 2025 – 21 September 2025
- Competitors: 2 (2 men)
- Medals Ranked 19th: Gold 1 Silver 0 Bronze 0 Total 1

World Athletics Championships appearances
- 1983; 1987; 1991; 1993; 1995; 1997; 1999; 2001; 2003; 2005; 2007; 2009; 2011; 2013; 2015; 2017; 2019; 2022; 2023; 2025

Tanzania competed at the 2025 World Athletics Championships in Tokyo, Japan, from 13 to 21 September 2025.

== Medallists ==
Medal	Athlete	Event	Date
Gold	Alphonce Simbu	Men's marathon	15 September

== Results ==
Tanzania entered 2 male athletes to the championships.

Key

- Q = Qualified for the next round
- q = Qualified for the next round as a fastest loser or, in field events, by position without achieving the qualifying target
- NR = National record
- PB = Personal best
- SB = Season best
- N/A = Round not applicable for the event

=== Men ===
Track and road events

Athlete	Event	Final	
Athlete	Event	Result	Rank
Josephat Joshua Gisemo	Marathon	2:22:47 SB	53
Alphonce Felix Simbu	Marathon	2:09:48 SB	1st place, gold medalist(s)
