= Zimbabwe at the 2025 World Athletics Championships =

- Flag of Zimbabwe
- WA code: ZIM

in Tokyo, Japan 13 September 2025 – 21 September 2025
- Competitors: 8 (5 men and 3 women)
- Medals: Gold 0 Silver 0 Bronze 0 Total 0

World Athletics Championships appearances (overview)
- 1983; 1987; 1991; 1993; 1995; 1997; 1999; 2001; 2003; 2005; 2007; 2009; 2011; 2013; 2015; 2017; 2019; 2022; 2023; 2025

Zimbabwe competed at the 2025 World Athletics Championships in Tokyo, Japan, from 13 to 21 September 2025.

== Results ==
Zimbabwe entered 8 athletes to the championships: 3 women and 5 men.

Key

- Q = Qualified for the next round
- q = Qualified for the next round as a fastest loser or, in field events, by position without achieving the qualifying target
- NR = National record
- PB = Personal best
- SB = Season best
- N/A = Round not applicable for the event

=== Men ===
Track and road events

Athlete	Event	Heat		Semifinal		Final	
Athlete	Event	Result	Rank	Result	Rank	Result	Rank
Makanakaishe Charamba	200 metres	20.06	2 Q	20.03	3	Did not advance	
Tapiwanashe Makarawu	200 metres	19.91	1 Q	19.98	4 q	20.12	7
Isaac Mpofu	Marathon	—N/a				2:10:46 SB	10
Tendai Zimuto	Marathon	—N/a				2:28:10	61

Field events

Athlete	Event	Qualification		Final	
Athlete	Event	Distance	Position	Distance	Position
Chengetayi Mapaya	Triple jump	16.59	17	Did not advance	

=== Women ===
Track and road events

Athlete	Event	Heat		Semifinal		Final	
Athlete	Event	Result	Rank	Result	Rank	Result	Rank
Vimbayi Maisvorewa	400 metres	52.28	7	Did not advance			
Fortunate Chidzivo	Marathon	—N/a				2:51:24	53
Ashley Miller	400 metres hurdles	56.35	8	Did not advance			
