= Tanzania at the 2017 World Championships in Athletics =

- WA code: TAN

in London
- Competitors: 8
- Medals Ranked =37th: Gold 0 Silver 0 Bronze 1 Total 1

World Championships in Athletics appearances
- 1983; 1987; 1991; 1993; 1995; 1997; 1999; 2001; 2003; 2005; 2007; 2009; 2011; 2013; 2015; 2017; 2019; 2022; 2023; 2025

Tanzania competed at the 2017 World Championships in Athletics in London, Great Britain, from 4–13 August 2017.

== Medalists ==
Medal	Name	Event	Date
Bronze	Alphonce Simbu	Men's marathon	August 6

== Results ==
(q – qualified, NM – no mark, SB – season best)

=== Men ===
Track and road events

Athlete	Event	Heat		Final	
Athlete	Event	Result	Rank	Result	Rank
Gabriel Gerald Geay	5000 metres	DNS	–	Did not advance	
Emanuel Giniki Gisamoda	5000 metres	13:32.31	27	Did not advance	
Stephno Gwandu Huche	Marathon	—N/a		2:20.05	38
Ezekiel Jafary	Marathon	—N/a		2:14.05	12
Alphonce Felix Simbu	Marathon	—N/a		2:09.51	3rd place, bronze medalist(s)

=== Women ===
Track and road events

Athlete	Event	Final	
Athlete	Event	Result	Rank
Failuna Abdi Matanga	10,000 metres	32:29.97	23
Sara Ramadhani	Marathon	2:46.23	56
Magdalena Shauri	Marathon	DNF	–
