= Gaborone Marathon =

Marathon in Gaborone, Botswana

- Date: Early May
- Location: Gaborone, Botswana
- Event type: Road
- Distance: Marathon, Half marathon, 10K run
- Primary sponsor: Diacore
- Beneficiary: List of beneficiaries: Y Care Charitable Trust; Mothers for All; Moremogolo Trust; Seeing is Believing; Lady Khama Charitable Trust
- Established: April 2009
- Course records: Men's: 2:15:25 (2013) (Kenya) Luka Chelimo; Women's: 2:39:31 (2013) (Kenya) Peris Kiprono
- Website: Gaborone Marathon
- Participants: 278 (2019)

The Diacore Gaborone Marathon is a marathon in Gaborone, Botswana. The marathon is governed by the International Association of Athletics Federations and the Botswana Athletics Association. It is open for to ages 19 and up, and the race is a qualifier for the Comrades Marathon in Durban and Pietermaritzburg, South Africa, and the 2012 Olympic Marathon in London. The marathon is the second of its kind in Botswana, after the Bosele Marathon in Selebi-Phikwe.

== History ==
The marathon was first established as the Gaborone City Marathon in 2009 and its Co Founders are Thola Magang and William Egner and was first run on 18 April 2010. The inaugural run started and ended in Phakalane Golf Estate. The 2011 race was cancelled due to financial issues. In 2012, Steinmetz Diamonds became the official sponsor of the marathon and renamed the marathon.

The 2020 edition of the race was postponed due to the coronavirus pandemic.

== Route ==
The 42.2-kilometre (26.2 mi) race begins at 6:15am and ends at the Phakalane Golf Estate several miles northeast of Gaborone. The race moves along the A1 highway towards the city center before turning northwest towards the Steinmetz building. The route then travels south towards the Gaborone Central Business District, passing the SADC headquarters and the Orapa House. The track then moves northward towards the Gaborone Private Hospital before rejoining the A1 highway. The marathon retraces its steps back towards the Phakalane Golf Estate where the marathon ends. Water is provided every 2.5 kilometres (1.6 mi). The race starts at 970 metres (3,180 ft) above sea level and has a maximum elevation of 1,025 metres (3,363 ft) above sea level.

=== Fun Run ===
There is also a 10-kilometre (6.2 mi) race open for ages 12 and up and a 4-kilometre (2.5 mi) race open to all. These routes are entirely within the Phakalane Golf Estate.

== Categories ==
The 42.2K race is divided by gender. Each gender race is divided into three categories based on age: open, veterans, and masters. Veterans are runners between 40 and 49 years of age, and Masters are runners older than 50. The 10K marathon is also divided into categories based on age and gender: open, juniors, veterans, and masters. This race is open to anyone older than 12.

== Results ==
The male and female winner of the marathon receives 25,000 Botswana pula (US$3,325 at the time of the 2012 race), second place receives P15,000, third receives P10,000, and fourth receives P5,000. The fastest male and female Botswana citizen will receive P10,000 from BIHL Insurance Company.

The top three runners, Felix Kipkoror, Benjamin Kipro Serem, and Jobo Khatoane, in the 2012 race qualified for the 2012 Olympic Marathon.

Winners of the Marathon Race
Year	Men's winner	Time	Women's winner	Time
2010	Simon Njoroge (KEN)	2:15:40	Samukeliso Moyo (ZIM)	2:50:27
2012	Felix Kangogo (KEN)	2:16:25	Samukeliso Moyo (ZIM)	2:48:29
2013	Luka Chelimo (KEN)	2:15:25	Peris Kiprono (KEN)	2:39:31
2014	Masilo Matjiane (LES)	2:15:37	Leena Ekandjo (NAM)	2:40:39
2015	Gilbert Mutandiro (ZIM)	2:17:34	Anna Amutoko (NAM)	2:50:23
2016	Gilbert Mutandiro (ZIM)	2:19:09	Alina Armas (NAM)	2:40:05
2017	Paulus Iiyambo (NAM)	2:18:59	Leena Ekandjo (NAM)	2:45:29
2018	Sibusiso Nzima (RSA)	2:16:57	Olivia Chitate (ZIM)	2:51:35
2019	Ramolefi Motsieloa (LES)	2:16:44	Lavinia Haitope (NAM)	2:41:02
2022	Munyaradzi Jari (ZIM)	2:16:10	Ottilie Aimwata (NAM)	3:01:56
2023	Jeremia Shaliaxwe (NAM)	2:19:29	Sheila Saina (KEN)	2:44:18
2024	Andrew Kiprop (KEN)	2:24:18	Sheila Saina (KEN)	3:15:06
