= Eritrea at the 2019 World Athletics Championships =

Eritrea at the 2019 World Championships in Athletics
- WA code: ERI

in Doha, Qatar
- Competitors: 6
- Medals: Gold 0 Silver 0 Bronze 0 Total 0

World Championships in Athletics appearances
- 1997; 1999; 2001; 2003; 2005; 2007; 2009; 2011; 2013; 2015; 2017; 2019; 2022; 2023

Eritrea competed at the 2019 World Championships in Athletics in Doha, Qatar, from 27 September–6 October 2019.

== Results ==
(q – qualified, NM – no mark, SB – season best)

=== Men ===
Track and road events

Athlete	Event	Heat		Final	
Athlete	Event	Result	Rank	Result	Rank
Aron Kifle	10,000 metres	—		28:16.74	14
Merhawi Kesete	Marathon	—		Did not finish	
Zersenay Tadese	Marathon	—		2:11:29 SB	6
Okubay Tsegay	Marathon	—		Did not finish	
Yemane Haileselassie	3000 metres steeplechase	8:26.58	23	Did not advance	

=== Women ===
Track and road events

Athlete	Event	Final	
Athlete	Event	Result	Rank
Nazret Weldu	Marathon	2:53:45	23
