= Zimbabwe at the 2019 World Athletics Championships =

- WA code: ZIM

in Doha, Qatar 27 September 2019 – 6 October 2019
- Competitors: 5 (4 men and 1 woman) in 3 events
- Medals: Gold 0 Silver 0 Bronze 0 Total 0

World Athletics Championships appearances
- 1983; 1987; 1991; 1993; 1995; 1997; 1999; 2001; 2003; 2005; 2007; 2009; 2011; 2013; 2015; 2017; 2019; 2022; 2023

Zimbabwe competed at the 2019 World Athletics Championships in Doha, Qatar, from 27 September to 6 October 2019.

== Results ==
Key

- Q = Qualified for the next round
- q = Qualified for the next round as a fastest loser or, in field events, by position without achieving the qualifying target
- NR = National record
- PB = Personal best
- SB = Season best
- N/A = Round not applicable for the event

=== Men ===
Track and road events

Athlete	Event	Final	
Athlete	Event	Result	Rank
Isaac Mpofu	Marathon	2:29:24	52
Munyaradzi Jari	Marathon	2:23:34	47
Ngonidzashe Ncube	Marathon	2:18:42	34

Field events

Athlete	Event	Qualification		Final	
Athlete	Event	Distance	Position	Distance	Position
Chengetayi Mapaya	Triple jump	16.36	25	Did not advance	

=== Women ===
Track and road events

Athlete	Event	Final	
Athlete	Event	Result	Rank
Rutendo Joan Nyahora	Marathon	2:52:33	21
