= 2019 World Athletics Championships – Men's marathon =

Long distance running race at the 2019 World Athletics Championships

Men's marathon at the 2019 World Championships
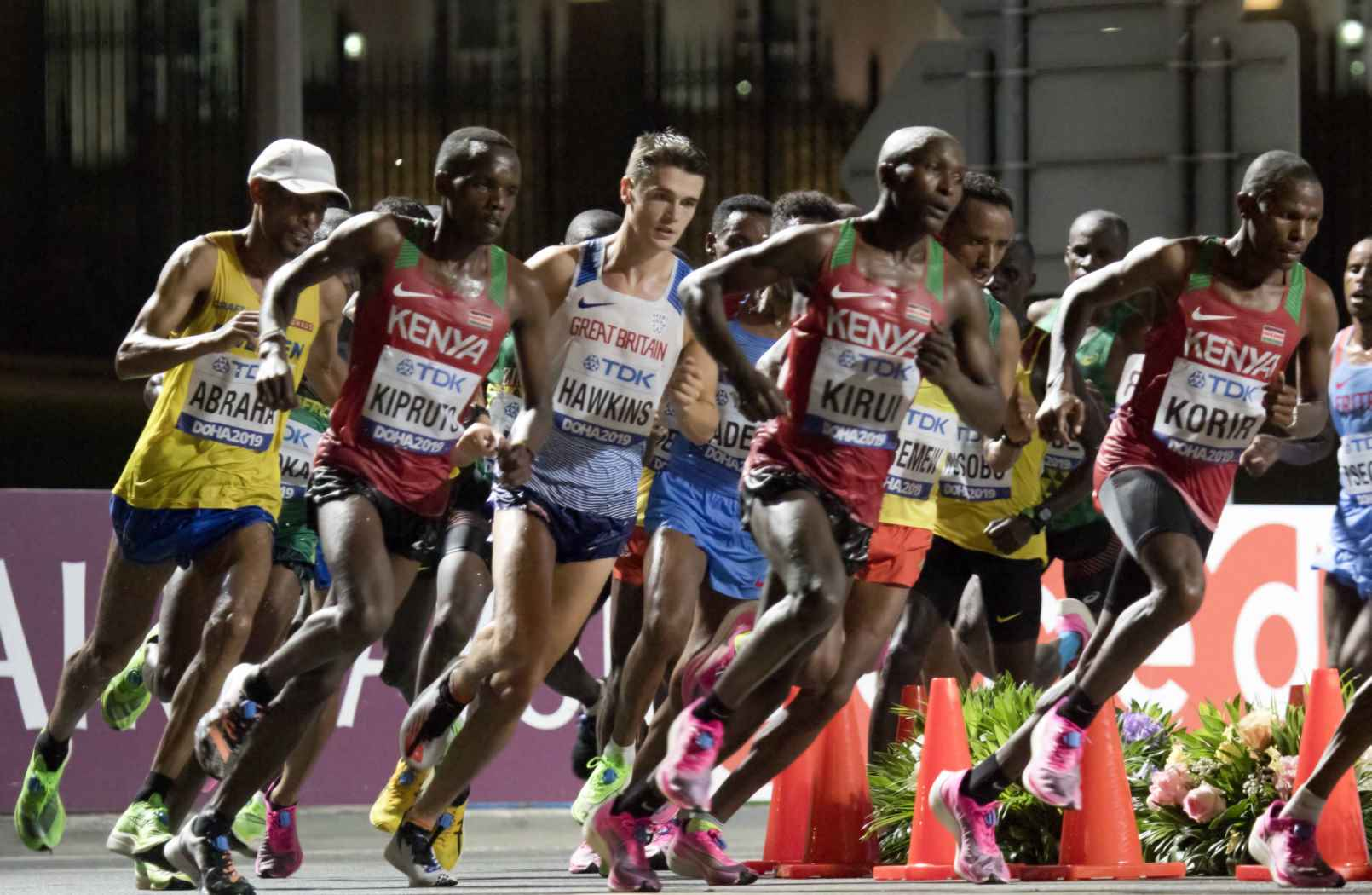
- Venue: Khalifa International Stadium
- Dates: 5–6 October
- Competitors: 73 from 42 nations
- Winning time: 2:10:40

Medalists
gold medal	Lelisa Desisa	Ethiopia
silver medal	Mosinet Geremew	Ethiopia
bronze medal	Amos Kipruto	Kenya

The men's marathon was one of the road events at the 2019 World Athletics Championships in Doha, Qatar. Due to the heat in Doha, the race was scheduled to begin at 23:59 on 5 October 2019. Even with the unusual timing, high temperatures were expected to provide difficult conditions for running, but in the end temperatures dropped to around 29 °C (84 °F) and 50% humidity. The race was won by Lelisa Desisa of Ethiopia in 2 h 10 min 40 s, followed four seconds behind by his compatriot Mosinet Geremew. Amos Kipruto of Kenya was third in 2:10:51.

The marathon was held on Doha Corniche, and consisted of six laps of a roughly 7-kilometre (4.3 mi) floodlit course. Derlis Ayala of Paraguay broke away from the start, and led the race until he was caught by a pack consisting of Desisa, Geremew, Geoffrey Kirui, Kipruto, Stephen Mokoka and Zersenay Tadese just before the halfway mark. Mokoka and Tadese attempted to speed away from the pack a few times, but were caught on each occasion. After 30 kilometres (19 mi), the pack began to splinter, and after Kirui and Tadese had dropped back, Callum Hawkins joined the leading group at the 40-kilometre (25 mi) point. Desisa gradually increased the pace from that stage, culminating in a sprint finish to win the race. All the top ten finishers qualified automatically for the 2020 Summer Olympics.

== Qualification ==
The International Association of Athletics Federations (IAAF, now World Athletics) announced the qualifying criteria for the 2019 World Athletics Championships in December 2018. For the men's marathon, the entry standard was 2:16:00, three minutes quicker than had been required for the 2017 marathon. Alternatively, a top-10 finish at an IAAF Gold Label marathon, or a wild card entry as the reigning world champion would ensure qualification. Entry criteria had to be met during the qualification period: 7 March 2018 to 6 September 2019, inclusive.

== Preview ==
Due to the hot conditions in Doha, the World Championships were scheduled in October, rather than the traditional August, and instead of holding the marathon during the day, it started just before midnight local time to minimise the impact that the heat would have on the race, making it the first-ever World Championships to feature night marathons; first the women's on 27 September, and then the men's on 5 October. Despite these changes, the temperature was expected to be a key factor in the race: temperatures were predicted to be around 30 °C (86 °F), with humidity levels above 80 per cent. In mitigation, the IAAF added extra water stations and medical staff along the route, as well as more ice baths at the finish. The course consisted of six laps of a floodlit roughly 7-kilometre (4.3 mi) course along the Doha Corniche, a waterfront promenade on Doha Bay. The loop started in front of the Amiri Diwan, and stretched to the Sheraton Hotel.

Eliud Kipchoge, the world record holder and Olympic champion for the marathon, did not take part in the World Championships as he was preparing for the Ineos 1:59 Challenge. Sean Ingle of The Guardian said that "most of the world's top marathon runners" were not taking part. Steve Smythe of Athletics Weekly concurred and said that with so many good runners missing, it was hard to predict who might win. He suggested Mosinet Geremew and Mule Wasihun of Ethiopia as contenders, along with the reigning World Champion, Geoffrey Kirui, though he noted that Kirui was out of form. In his preview for World Athletics, Mike Rowbottom suggested that the winner was "likely to be Kenyan, Ethiopian or Bahraini", and he concurred that Geremew and Wasihun were the two "clear favourites".

Both the high temperatures, and the tactical nature of World Championship races, meant that it was not expected that any records would be set. Abel Kirui held the World Championship record of 2:06:54 achieved in 2009, while Eliud Kipchoge held the overall men's world record of 2:01:39, set during the 2018 Berlin Marathon.

== Summary ==
The race was officially scheduled to start at 23:59 local time (UTC+3) on 5 October 2019; temperatures had cooled since the women's marathon, at 29.1 °C (84.4 °F) and 48.6 per cent humidity. At the start of the race, Derlys Ayala of Paraguay broke away from the front of the field and established a 150 metre-lead over the other runners by the end of the first kilometre. Behind Ayala, who had run the Buenos Aires Marathon twelve days earlier and was not considered a genuine contender in the race, a pack consisting of Lelisa Desisa, Mosinet Geremew, Geoffrey Kirui, Amos Kipruto, Stephen Mokoka and Zersenay Tadese formed. David Monti of LetsRun.com described them as a "pack of six serious contenders". Ayala held a 62-second lead at the 15-kilometre (9.3 mi) point of the race, but 5 kilometres (3.1 mi) later, the margin had been reduced to six seconds. By halfway through the race, Ayala had been caught, and he withdrew from the race soon after. Over the next 8 kilometres (5.0 mi), Tadese led most of the race. He and Mokoka broke away from the rest a few times, but could not maintain the advantage, and were caught each time. After the race, Desisa said "I controlled everybody and I saved my power."

The leading group of six completed the first 30 kilometres (19 mi) of the race in 1:33:13, but started to break apart over the next 10 kilometres (6.2 mi). Kirui was the first to drop away, followed by Tadese. In contrast, Callum Hawkins, who had been in ninth place after 30 km, closed the gap on the leaders to around 14 seconds by the 37 kilometres (23 mi) point. Geremew said that he started to develop plantar pain about one kilometre (0.62 mi) later and slowed the pace a little, which allowed Hawkins to catch the pack just prior to the 40-kilometre (25 mi) point, when he briefly led the race. The pace increased as they approached the end of the race; the 41st kilometre was completed in 2:59. When there was one kilometre left, Desisa increased the pace again, which Hawkins could not match, and the Scottish runner fell back. After the race, he suggested that: "Maybe I just gave too much in the middle stages. But I couldn't do any more." Kipruto was also unable to keep up with the fast finish, and when Desisa accelerated to a sprint for the final 150 metres (490 ft), he also broke clear of Geremew to claim the gold medal. He won the race in a time of 2:10:40, four seconds ahead of Geremew. Kipruto held onto third place in 2:10:51, six seconds in front of Hawkins.

== Results ==
The final was started on 5 October at 23:59. The results were as follows:

Rank	Name	Nationality	Time	Notes
1st place, gold medalist(s)	Lelisa Desisa	Ethiopia	2:10:40	SB
2nd place, silver medalist(s)	Mosinet Geremew	Ethiopia	2:10:44	
3rd place, bronze medalist(s)	Amos Kipruto	Kenya	2:10:51	
4	Callum Hawkins	Great Britain & N.I.	2:10:57	
5	Stephen Mokoka	South Africa	2:11:09	
6	Zersenay Tadese	Eritrea	2:11:29	SB
7	El-Hassan El-Abbassi	Bahrain	2:11:44	SB
8	Hamza Sahli	Morocco	2:11:49	
9	Tadesse Abraham	Switzerland	2:11:58	
10	Daniel Mateo	Spain	2:12:15	
11	Laban Korir	Kenya	2:12:38	
12	Yassine Rachik	Italy	2:12:41	
13	Fred Musobo	Uganda	2:13:42	
14	Geoffrey Kirui	Kenya	2:13:54	SB
15	Eyob Faniel	Italy	2:13:57	SB
16	Alphonce Simbu	Tanzania	2:13:57	
17	Tomas Hilifa Rainhold	Namibia	2:14:38	
18	Stephen Kiprotich	Uganda	2:15:04	
19	Paulo Roberto Paula	Brazil	2:15:09	
20	Yang Shaohui	China	2:15:17	
21	Thonakal Gopi	India	2:15:57	
22	Félicien Muhitira	Rwanda	2:16:21	
23	Ahmed Osman	United States	2:16:22	SB
24	Weldu Negash Gebretsadik	Norway	2:16:35	
25	Hiroki Yamagishi	Japan	2:16:43	SB
26	Tiidrek Nurme	Estonia	2:17:38	
27	Malcolm Hicks	New Zealand	2:17:45	
28	Adhanom Abraha	Sweden	2:17:57	
29	Yuki Kawauchi	Japan	2:17:59	
30	Caden Shields	New Zealand	2:18:08	
31	Thijs Nijhuis	Denmark	2:18:10	
32	Desmond Mokgobu	South Africa	2:18:21	
33	Roman Fosti	Estonia	2:18:30	SB
34	Ngonidzashe Ncube	Zimbabwe	2:18:42	
35	Fyodor Shutov	Authorised Neutral Athletes	2:18:58	
36	John Mason	Canada	2:19:21	
37	Kohei Futaoka	Japan	2:19:23	
38	Elkanah Kibet	United States	2:19:33	SB
39	Julian Spence	Australia	2:19:40	
40	Tseveenravdangiin Byambajav	Mongolia	2:20:07	
41	Lemawork Ketema	Austria	2:20:45	
42	Thomas De Bock	Belgium	2:21:13	
43	Stephen Scullion	Ireland	2:21:31	
44	Wellington Bezerra da Silva	Brazil	2:21:49	
45	Berhanu Girma	Canada	2:22:28	
46	Andrew Epperson	United States	2:23:11	
47	Munyaradzi Jari	Zimbabwe	2:23:34	
48	Dmitrijs Serjogins	Latvia	2:24:00	PB
49	Andrey Petrov	Uzbekistan	2:24:54	
50	Ihor Porozov	Ukraine	2:26:11	
51	Vagner da Silva Noronha	Brazil	2:26:11	
52	Isaac Mpofu	Zimbabwe	2:29:24	
53	Uladzislau Pramau	Belarus	2:31:04	
54	Bat-Ochiryn Ser-Od	Mongolia	2:36:01	
55	Nicolás Cuestas	Uruguay	2:40:05	
DNF	Evans Kiplagat	Azerbaijan	DNF	
DNF	Olivier Irabaruta	Burundi	DNF	
DNF	Benson Seurei	Bahrain	DNF	
DNF	Duo Bujie	China	DNF	
DNF	Merhawi Kesete	Eritrea	DNF	
DNF	Okubay Tsegay	Eritrea	DNF	
DNF	Mule Wasihun	Ethiopia	DNF	
DNF	Daniele Meucci	Italy	DNF	
DNF	Paul Lonyangata	Kenya	DNF	
DNF	Mohamed Reda El Aaraby	Morocco	DNF	
DNF	Derlis Ayala	Paraguay	DNF	
DNF	Thabiso Benedict Moeng	South Africa	DNF	
DNF	Stephno Gwandu Huche	Tanzania	DNF	
DNF	Augustino Paulo Sulle	Tanzania	DNF	
DNF	Tony Ah-Thit Payne	Thailand	DNF	
DNF	Polat Kemboi Arikan	Turkey	DNF	
DNF	Mert Girmalegesse	Turkey	DNF	
DNF	Solomon Mutai	Uganda	DNF	
