= Great Ocean Road Marathon =

Long-distance running event in Victoria, Australia

The Great Ocean Road Marathon is a long-distance run held in Victoria, Australia since 2005. The main race stretches 44km from Lorne to Apollo Bay along the coastal route. It is the main race within the annual Great Ocean Road Running Festival, which also includes 60km, 23km and 6km runs, 5km and 10km walks and a 1.5km Kids Gallop. In 2019 a total of 8200 runners took part across the events. The event began in 2005, founded by Les Noseda with the assistance of The Apollo Bay Chamber of Commerce, Ross Stephens, Nick Polgeeft, Gerry Tidd and Joe Di Ceccio. It is now owned by MARI. The course record of 2:27:37 was set in 2019 by Australian runner Nick Earl. Earl broke the previous record of 2:27:42 set in 2011 by James Kipkelwon of Kenya, who also won the event in 2012.

== Past winners ==
Key: Course record Country's championship race

Edition	Year	Men's winner	Time (h:m:s)	Women's winner	Time (h:m:s)
1st	2005	Elkana Machuka (KEN)	2:31:13	Rosie Doran (AUS)	3:31:09
2nd	2006	James Kariuki (KEN)	2:43:55	Nadelle Legge (AUS)	3:15:36
3rd	2007	David Mutua (KEN)	2:36:35	Helen Stanton (AUS)	2:58:15
4th	2008	David Mutua (KEN)	2:36:43	Helen Stanton (AUS)	3:10:59
5th	2009	Charles Muturi (KEN)	2:44:55	Helen Stanton (AUS)	2:59:41
6th	2010	Mark Tucker (AUS)	2:29:41	Lucie Hardiman (AUS)	3:07:41
7th	2011	James Kipkelwon (KEN)	2:29:16	Natalie Mensch (AUS)	3:20:16
8th	2012	James Kipkelwon (KEN)	2:27:42	Kelly Jarret (AUS)	2:59:36
9th	2013	Joel Chepkopol (KEN)	2:27:50	Tracie Kaye (AUS)	3:08:44
10th	2014	Alexander Matthews (AUS)	2:32:33	Kirstin Bull (AUS)	3:07:51
11th	2015	Julian Spence (AUS)	2:37:23	Kirstin Bull (AUS)	3:01:56
12th	2016	Julian Spence (AUS)	2:33:00	Kirstin Bull (AUS)	3:06:37
13th	2017	Julian Spence (AUS)	2:32:44	Jane Fardell (AUS)	3:10:53
14th	2018	Julian Spence (AUS)	2:35:43	Rhiannon Snipe (AUS)	3:06:32
15th	2019	Nick Earl (GBR)	2:27:37	Rhiannon Snipe (AUS)	3:04:36
	2020	postponed due to coronavirus pandemic			
16th	2021	John Csongei (AUS)	2:48:20	Aleara Wallace (AUS)	3:09:16
17th	2022	Dion Finocchiaro (AUS)	2:30:20	Kirstin Bull (AUS)	3:04:28
18th	2023	Toby Menday (AUS)	2:46:05	Sara Coulter (AUS)	3:06:02
19th	2024	Johannes Motschmann (GER)	2:36:35	Meriem Daoui (AUS)	3:04:23
