= Tanzania at the 2019 World Athletics Championships =

Tanzania at the 2019 World Championships in Athletics
- WA code: TAN

in Doha, Qatar
- Competitors: 4 (3 men and 1 woman) in 2 events
- Medals: Gold 0 Silver 0 Bronze 0 Total 0

World Championships in Athletics appearances
- 1983; 1987; 1991; 1993; 1995; 1997; 1999; 2001; 2003; 2005; 2007; 2009; 2011; 2013; 2015; 2017; 2019; 2022; 2023

Tanzania competed at the 2019 World Championships in Athletics in Doha, Qatar from 27 September to 6 October 2019.

== Results ==
=== Men ===
Track and road events

| Athlete | Event | Final | |
| Athlete | Event | Result | Rank |
|---|---|---|---|
| Alphonce Simbu | Marathon | 2:13:57 | 16 |
| Stephno Gwandu Huche | Marathon | DNF | – |
| Augustino Paulo Sulle | Marathon | DNF | – |

=== Women ===
Track and road events

| Athlete | Event | Final | |
| Athlete | Event | Result | Rank |
|---|---|---|---|
| Failuna Abdi Matanga | Marathon | DNF | – |
