= Kohei Futaoka =

Japanese long-distance runner

Personal information
- Born: 5 February 1994 (age 31)

Sport
- Country: Japan
- Sport: Long-distance running

Kohei Futaoka (二岡 康平, Futaoka Kōhei; born 5 February 1994) is a Japanese long-distance runner. In 2019, he represented Japan at the 2019 World Athletics Championships held in Doha, Qatar and he competed in the men's marathon. He finished in 37th place.
