= John Mason (runner) =

Canadian long-distance runner

Personal information
- Born: 2 September 1987 (age 38)

Sport
- Country: Canada
- Sport: Long-distance running

John Mason (born 2 September 1987) is a Canadian long-distance runner. In 2019, he competed in the men's marathon at the 2019 World Athletics Championships held in Doha, Qatar. He finished in 36th place.
