= Kyoto Marathon =

Road running event in Kyoto, Japan

- Date: Third Sunday in February
- Location: Kyoto, Japan
- Event type: Road
- Distance: Marathon
- Established: 2012
- Course records: Men: 2:14:15 (Japan) Yuma Morii (2024); Women: 2:45:15 (Japan) Yuria Ikuno (2017)
- Website: Kyoto Marathon
- Participants: 13,894 (2020)

The Kyoto Marathon (京都マラソン, Kyōto Marason) is an annual marathon sporting event for men and women over the classic distance of 42.195 kilometres which is held in mid February in Kyoto, Japan. The course starts at Nishikyogoku Athletic Stadium and pass through Kyoto Botanical Gardens and the right bank of Kamo river and finishes near Heian Jingu. It was one of the top ten most expensive of the world's biggest marathons by entry cost in 2015.

An event with the same name was held from 1969 to 1982.

== Results ==
Key: Course record

Edition	Date	Men's winner	Time (h:m:s)	Women's winner	Time (h:m:s)
1st	11 March 2012	Junichi Ushiyama (JPN)	2:26:21	Reiko Kobayashi (JPN)	2:48:47
2nd	10 March 2013	Shingo Igarashi (JPN)	2:20:30	Reiko Kobayashi (JPN)	2:49:06
3rd	16 February 2014	Hiroki Yokoyama (JPN)	2:25:18	Yukari Nomura (JPN)	2:49:10
4th	15 February 2015	Hiroki Yokoyama (JPN)	2:21:14	Ai Furukubo (JPN)	2:45:30
5th	21 February 2016	Daisuke Uekado (JPN)	2:17:54	Hisayo Matsumoto (JPN)	2:50:41
6th	19 February 2017	Kosuke Murasashi (JPN)	2:20:32	Yuria Ikuno (JPN)	2:45:15
7th	18 February 2018	Shunsuke Hisamoto (JPN)	2:23:44	Izumi Nakajima (JPN)	2:51:57
8th	17 February 2019	Tatsuya Maruyama (JPN)	2:16:27	Risa Shinozaki (JPN)	2:51:40
9th	16 February 2020	Yūji Shibukawa (JPN)	2:21:48	Chiaki Omae (JPN)	2:45:25
10th	19 February 2023	Yudai Fukuda (JPN)	2:19:39	Mikiko Ota (JPN)	2:48:57
11th	18 February 2024	Yuma Morii (JPN)	2:14:15	Fuka Hirokawa (JPN)	2:47:22

== Kyoto Marathon (1969–1982) ==
Winners
Edition	Date	Athlete	Country	Time	Notes
1	March 9, 1969	Seiji Fukada	Japan	2:17:43.8	
2	February 8, 1970	Kokichi Uchino	Japan	2:16:55.8	
3	February 7, 1971	Hayami Tanimura	Japan	2:13:45.2	Course record
4	February 6, 1972	Susumu Sato	Japan	2:17:37	
5	February 5, 1973	Jack Foster	New Zealand	2:14:53.4	
6	February 3, 1974	Matti Vuorenmaa	Finland	2:15:10.8	
7	February 9, 1975	Mineteru Sakamoto	Japan	2:17:15.4	
8	February 8, 1976	Hatsuo Okubo	Japan	2:16:50.2	
9	February 13, 1977	Bill Rodgers	United States	2:14:26.2	
10	February 12, 1978	David Chettle	Australia	2:16:00.4	
11	February 11, 1979	Masahiko Furuta	Japan	2:18:08.2	
12	February 10, 1980	Kazuo Takatori	Japan	2:15:23	
13	February 15, 1981	Koshiro Kawaguchi	Japan	2:18:14	
14	February 11, 1982	Masahiko Furuta	Japan	2:17:58	2nd victory
