= Ismail Juma =

Tanzanian long-distance runner

Personal information
- Born: 3 August 1991
- Died: 3 November 2017 (aged 26)

Sport
- Country: Tanzania
- Sport: Track and field
- Event: long-distance running
- Updated on 29 August 2015

Ismail Juma (3 August 1991 – 3 November 2017) was a Tanzanian long-distance runner.

== Career ==
He competed in the 10,000 metres event at the 2015 World Championships in Athletics in Beijing, China, but did not finish.

Juma won the Kilimanjaro half marathon in 2015, and the Istanbul Half Marathon in 2017, setting a new record of 1:00:09. As of November 2017, holds the Tanzanian national half marathon record of 59min 30sec.

== Death ==
Juma died in November 2017 after being involved in a motorcycle accident. At the time of his death, he had been selected as one of the athletes training for the Commonwealth Games in Australia.

== See also ==
- Tanzania at the 2015 World Championships in Athletics
