= Kirstin Bull =

Australian long-distance runner

Kirstin Bull is an Australian ultramarathoner and long-distance runner.

In 2014–2016, she won the Great Ocean Road Marathon.

Bull won the 2016 IAU 100 km World Championships.

She is the national record holder at the 100 km distance.
