= Andrew Epperson =

American long-distance runner

Personal information
- Born: November 24, 1990 (age 35)

Sport
- Country: United States
- Sport: Long-distance running

Achievements and titles
- Personal best: Marathon: 2:13:11 (Beppu 2019)

Andrew Epperson (born November 24, 1990) is an American long-distance runner. He competed in the men's marathon at the 2019 World Athletics Championships held in Doha, Qatar. He finished in 46th place.
