= Gilbert Kirwa =

Kenyan long-distance runner

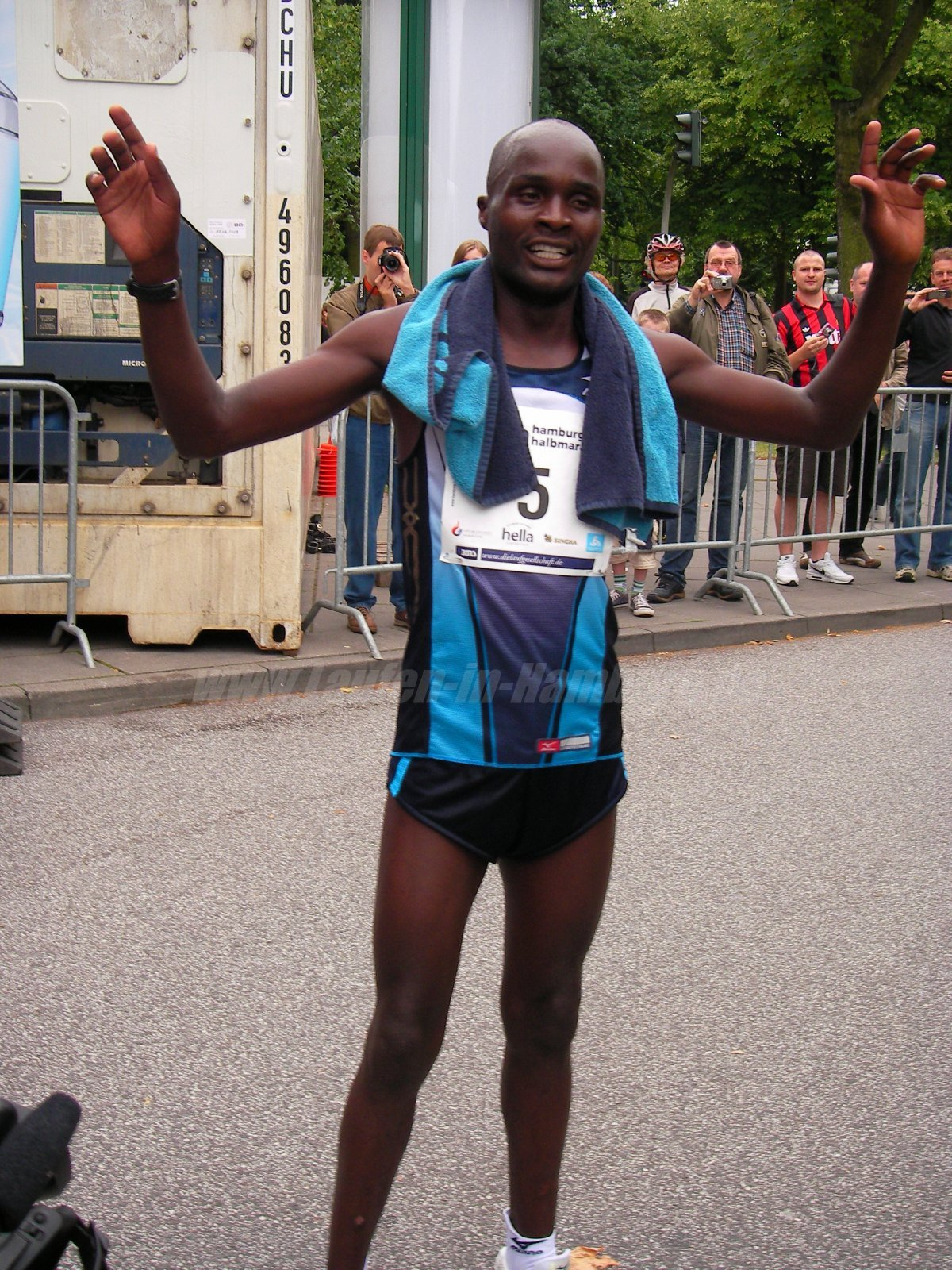
Kirwa celebrating victory at the 2009 Hamburg Half Marathon

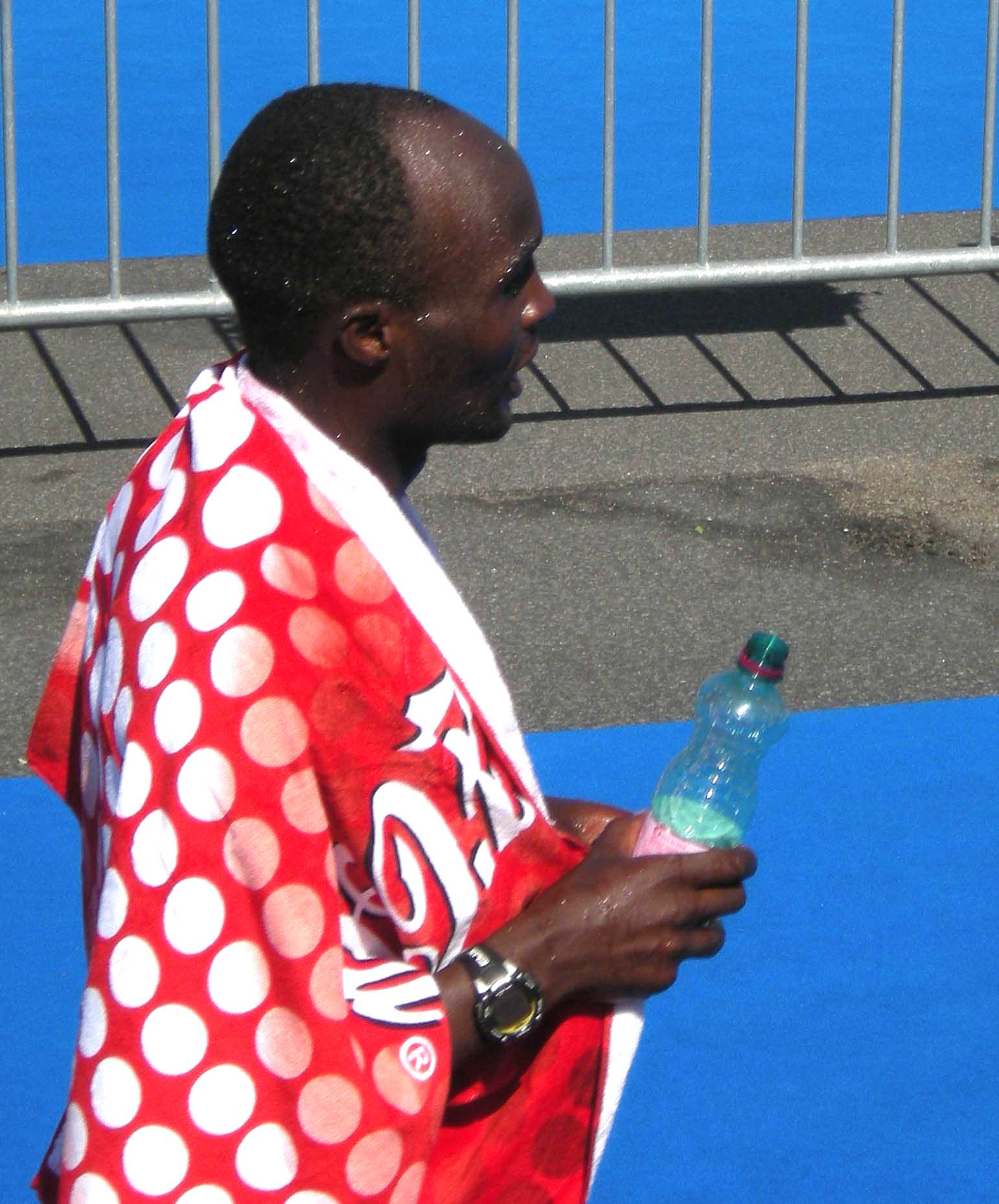
Kirwa after winning the 2009 Vienna Marathon

Gilbert Kipruto Kirwa (born 20 December 1985) is a Kenyan athlete who specialises in long-distance running and the marathon. His personal best for the marathon is 2:06:14 hours and has won races in Vienna and Frankfurt.

== Career ==
A Nandi from Nandi Hills, Kenya, Kirwa had no background in running when a friend, the Ugandan professional runner Nicholas Kiprono, asked him to begin training with him in 2005. Based on what he had seen in training, Jason Mbote asked if Kirwa would be a pacemaker for him at the 2008 Seoul International Marathon in South Korea. This was the first time Kirwa had left Kenya, and his first ever international competition, but he set a strong pace up to the 33 kilometre mark and athletics agent Gerard van de Veen signed him on the strength of the run.

He made his competitive debut in 2009, to much success: he won the Vienna Marathon with a time of 2:08:21, in what was he first ever attempt at the distance. He won the Hamburg Half Marathon in June with a best of 1:01:52, won the 10 km race in Wierden the following month, and took third at the Loopfestijn Voorthuizen 10 km race. Running in the Frankfurt Marathon in October, his second race at the distance, he beat the defending champion Robert Kiprono Cheruiyot and also broke the course record. His time of 2:06:14 ranked among the top-twenty fastest marathons on record. The win at the IAAF Gold Label Road Race earned the runner €95,000 in prize money and bonuses. Following this result, Kirwa stated his career ambition to challenge Haile Gebrselassie's world record.

He signed up for the 2010 Seoul International Marathon but was beaten to the finish line by surprise winner Sylvester Teimet. Kirwa's time of 2:06:59 for a silver medal was the second fastest ever marathon recorded in South Korea after Teimet's winning time. He ran the BIG 25K in Berlin in May and ran significantly faster than the world record pace, but still his mark of 1:11:58 was not enough to beat the race winner Samuel Kosgei. In 2011 he ran at the Amsterdam Marathon, but slowed significantly in the second half, finishing in a time of 2:14:29 hours. His first race of 2012 was the Vienna Marathon and he came fourth in a time of 2:08:09 hours. He tried for another win in Frankfurt that October but ended the race in third, as world record holder Patrick Makau took the victory.

He ran two marathons in 2013: first he was sixth at the Tokyo Marathon, then he returned to Frankfurt, but failed to finish the race on that occasion. He was third at the Seoul International Marathon in March 2014, running his second fastest ever time with 2:06:44 hours.

== Achievements ==
- All results regarding marathon, unless stated otherwise

| Year | Competition | Venue | Position | Notes |
Representing Kenya
| 2009 | Vienna Marathon | Vienna, Austria | 1st | 2:08:21 |
| 2009 | Frankfurt Marathon | Frankfurt, Germany | 1st | 2:06:14 |
| 2010 | Seoul Marathon | Seoul, South Korea | 2nd | 2:06:59 |

== Personal bests ==
| Surface | Event | Time (h:m:s) | Venue | Date |
|---|---|---|---|---|
| Road | Half marathon | 1:01:52 | Hamburg | 28 June 2009 |
| Road | 25 kilometres | 1:11:58 | Berlin | 9 May 2010 |
| Road | Marathon | 2:06:14 | Frankfurt | 25 October 2009 |
