= Hamburg Half Marathon =

- Date: Annually June
- Location: Hamburg
- Event type: Road
- Distance: Half marathon
- Primary sponsor: Hella
- Established: 1995; 31 years ago
- Course records: Men's: 1:00:52 (2015) (Eritrea) Merhawi Kesete; Women's: 1:10:05 (2023) (Israel) Lonah Chemtai Salpeter
- Website: Hamburg Half Marathon
- Participants: 8,060 (2019)

The Hamburg Half Marathon is an annual road running event held in Hamburg, Germany. It is currently sponsored by Hella Mineral Water.

== History ==
The race was first run in 1995 in Hamburg Stadtpark and was named the Hamburg-Mannheimer Cup. In 2003, the course was changed so that it ran through the city, and the race was renamed Hamburg Halbmarathon (Hamburg Half Marathon). Hella became the title sponsor the following year, in 2004.

The 2020 edition of the race was cancelled due to the coronavirus pandemic, with registrants having the option of transferring their entry to 2021.

== Course ==
The start is on the Reeperbahn and heads west before turning east along the banks of the Elbe and through the city. It makes a lap of the Außenalster before finishing on the Rothenbaumchaussee.

== Past winners ==
Edition	Year	Date	Men's winner	Time (h:m:s)	Women's winner	Time (h:m:s)
30	2024	26 June	Vincent Kimutai (KEN)	1:02:09	Alemaddis Eyayu (ETH)	1:10:47
29	2023	25 June	Samwel Mailu (KEN)	1:01:09	Lonah Chemtai Salpeter (ISR)	1:10:05
28	2022	26 June	Samwel Mailu (KEN)	1:01:52	Ludwina Chepngetich (KEN)	1:12:32
27	2021	27 June	COVID-19 / digital virtual event			
26	2020	cancelled due to coronavirus pandemic				
25	2019	30 June	Stephen Kiprotich (UGA)	1:04:11	Melat Kejeta (ETH)	1:11:28
24	2018	1 July	Kalipus Lomwai (KEN)	1:01:22	Gladys Jeptepkeny (KEN)	1:10:13
23	2017	25 June	Albert Kangogo (KEN)	1:01:07	Flomena Chepchirchir (KEN)	1:10:21
22	2016	26 June	Geoffrey Yegon (KEN)	1:01:46	Antonina Kwambai (KEN)	1:12:48
21	2015	21 June	Merhawi Kesete (ERI)	1:00:52	Agnes Mutune (KEN)	1:11:27
20	2014	29 June	Charles Wachira (KEN)	1:01:41	Agnes Mutune (KEN)	1:12:46
19	2013	23 June	Abrha Gebregziabher (ERI)	1:03:39	Alemtsehay Mesfin (ETH)	1:14:33
18	2012	24 June	Jacob Kendagor (KEN)	1:02:21	Caroline Chepkwony (KEN)	1:13:27
17	2011		Josphat Kiprono (KEN)	1:03:15	Monica Jepkoech (KEN)	1:16:08
16	2010		Peter Kwalia (KEN)	1:07:21	Caroline Chepkwony (KEN)	1:13:57
15	2009		Gilbert Kirwa (KEN)	1:01:52	Caroline Chepkwony (KEN)	1:14:51
14	2008		Peter Kiprotich (KEN)	1:03:41	Pauline Njery (KEN)	1:15:22
13	2007		Elijah Keitany (KEN)	1:04:38	Ednah Mukhwana (KEN)	1:22:14
12	2006		Shadrack Kiyai (KEN)	1:07:27	Marisol Madera (ESP)	1:27:46
11	2005		Augustus Mbusya (KEN)	1:05:57	Mercy Kibarus (KEN)	1:20:24
10	2004		Amos Matui (KEN)	1:05:26	Lydia Kurgat (KEN)	1:16:37
9	2003		Philip Cheruiyot (KEN)	1:06:45	Gitte Karlshøj (DEN)	1:16:40
8	2002		Meshack Kosgei (KEN)	1:07:28	Gitte Karlshøj (DEN)	1:14:01
7	2001		Steffen Benecke (GER)	1:06:23	Mariya Latysheva (UKR)	1:17:25
6	2000		James Tanui (KEN)	1:05:45	Gabriele Schult (GER)	1:22:47
5	1999		Samwel Kiplimo (KEN)	1:07:10	Christine Stief (GER)	1:19:47
4	1998		Stephen Rugut (KEN)	1:04:51	Gabriele Schult (GER)	1:20:34
3	1997		Stephan Freigang (GER)	1:02:37	Christina Mai (GER)	1:14:46
2	1996		Jürgen Kerl (GER)	1:04:22	Rose Marie Soares (FRA)	1:14:34
1	1995		Michael Hass (GER)	1:04:09	Manuela Veith (GER)	1:16:57
