= Ihor Porozov =

Ukrainian long-distance runner

Personal information
- Born: 22 March 1991 (age 34)

Sport
- Country: Ukraine
- Sport: Long-distance running

Ihor Porozov (Ukrainian: Ігор Порозов; born 22 March 1991) is a Ukrainian long-distance runner. In 2019, he competed in the men's marathon at the 2019 World Athletics Championships held in Doha, Qatar. He finished in 50th place.
