= Little Rock Marathon =

Road running event in Little Rock, Arkansas

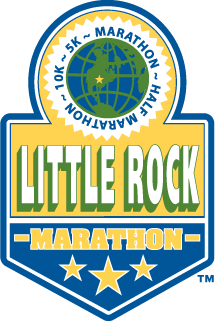
Little Rock Marathon Shield

The Little Rock Marathon, started in 2003, is an annual marathon held in Little Rock, Arkansas. The event, which is traditionally held the first weekend of March each year, attracts participants from all 50 states and over 15 different countries. The mission of the Little Rock Marathon is to provide a premier event open to athletes of all abilities, while promoting a healthy lifestyle through running and walking and raising money for Little Rock Parks & Recreation. In January 2016, Runner's World named the Little Rock Marathon as a “Bucket List Race: 10 Great Marathons for First-Timers”. It also ranked #5 on American Town Media's "The Dream 26: The Best and Most Unique Marathons In America" list and voted one of the best Half Marathons in the nation on the 100 Half Marathons Club 2017 list.

The Little Rock Marathon is famous for the world's largest finisher's medal (According to Runners World). The 2015 marathon medal measured 8 ½ x 8 ¼ inches and weighed just over 3 pounds. Each year, the marathon has a different theme which is reflected in the décor at the Health and Fitness Expo, racecourse areas, post-race events, and in the huge finishers medal and all official merchandise. Many participants are also dress in costumes according to the year's race theme.

The Little Rock Marathon has an 8-hour time limit for the marathon and 4-hour time limit for the half-marathon, making it friendly for walkers and beginner runners. The Little Rock Marathon also offers a free, year-round training program for those interested in training for a race or improving/maintaining their health and fitness.

== Course ==
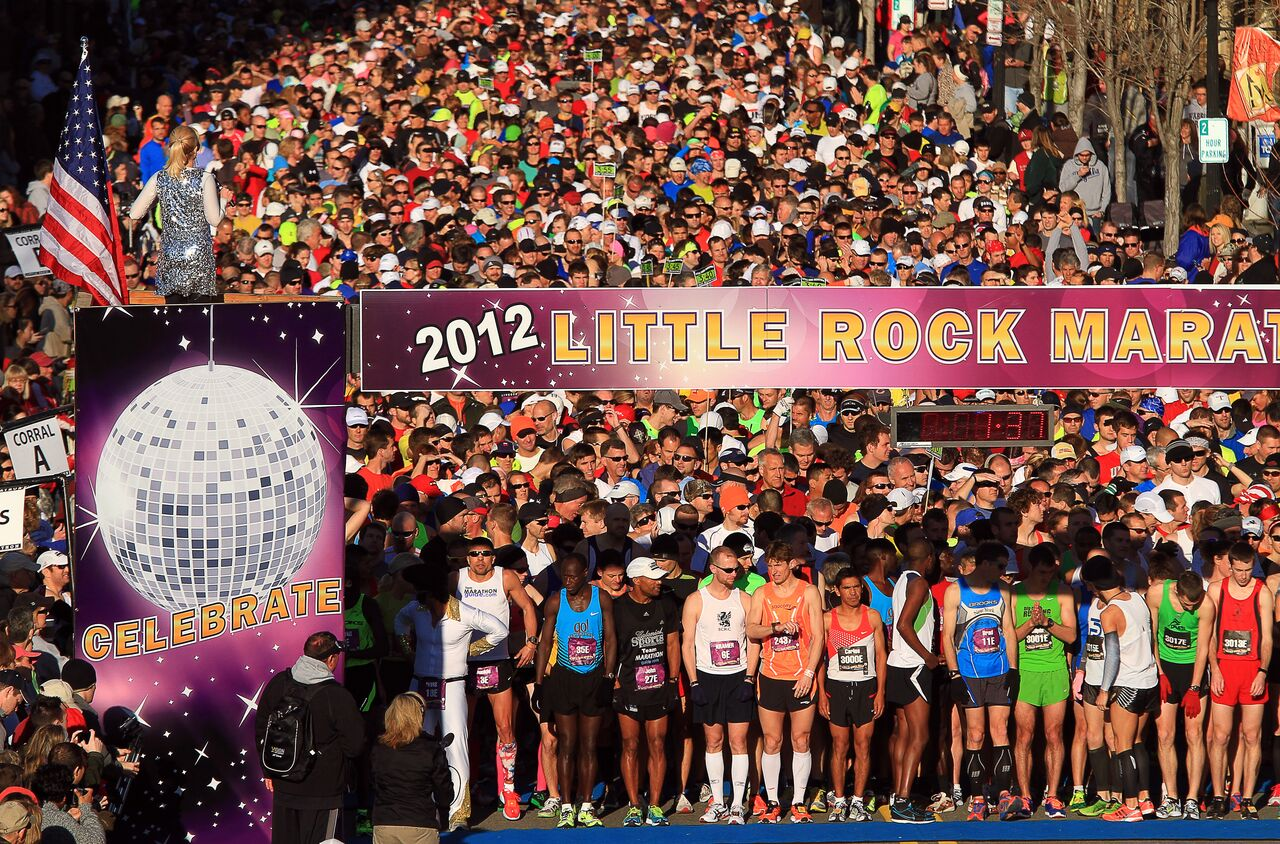
2012 start line

The Little Rock Marathon is a USATF sanctioned event on a certified 26.2-mile (42.2 km) single loop course. The course, which starts and finishes in Downtown Little Rock and also crosses over the Arkansas River, is scenic and includes many of Little Rock's famous and historic landmarks. The spectator-friendly course features entertainment and crowd support along the course. The race is filled with loads of southern hospitality and several unique features, such as the couch potato mile and the Lipstick Stop (so runners can look good for their finish photos).

It was the first race in the state to be transponder chip timed, and is also a qualifying event for the Boston Marathon. The Little Rock Marathon Course is described as relatively hilly. Running great Bill Rodgers once said "any marathon worth its salt has a few hills. Little Rock is a little salty." The largest hill is found early in the race with a number of smaller hills throughout.

The elevation change for the entire course is as follows:

- Start = 270 feet (82 m) above sea level
- Finish = 260 feet (79 m) above sea level
- Highest point = 519 feet (158 m) above sea level
- Lowest point = 246 feet (75 m) above sea level

=== Landmarks ===
Landmarks along the course include the Arkansas State Capitol, River Market District, the Clinton Presidential Center, Governor's Mansion, MacArthur Birthplace/Military Museum, and Historic Little Rock Central High School.

== Little Rock Marathon Events ==
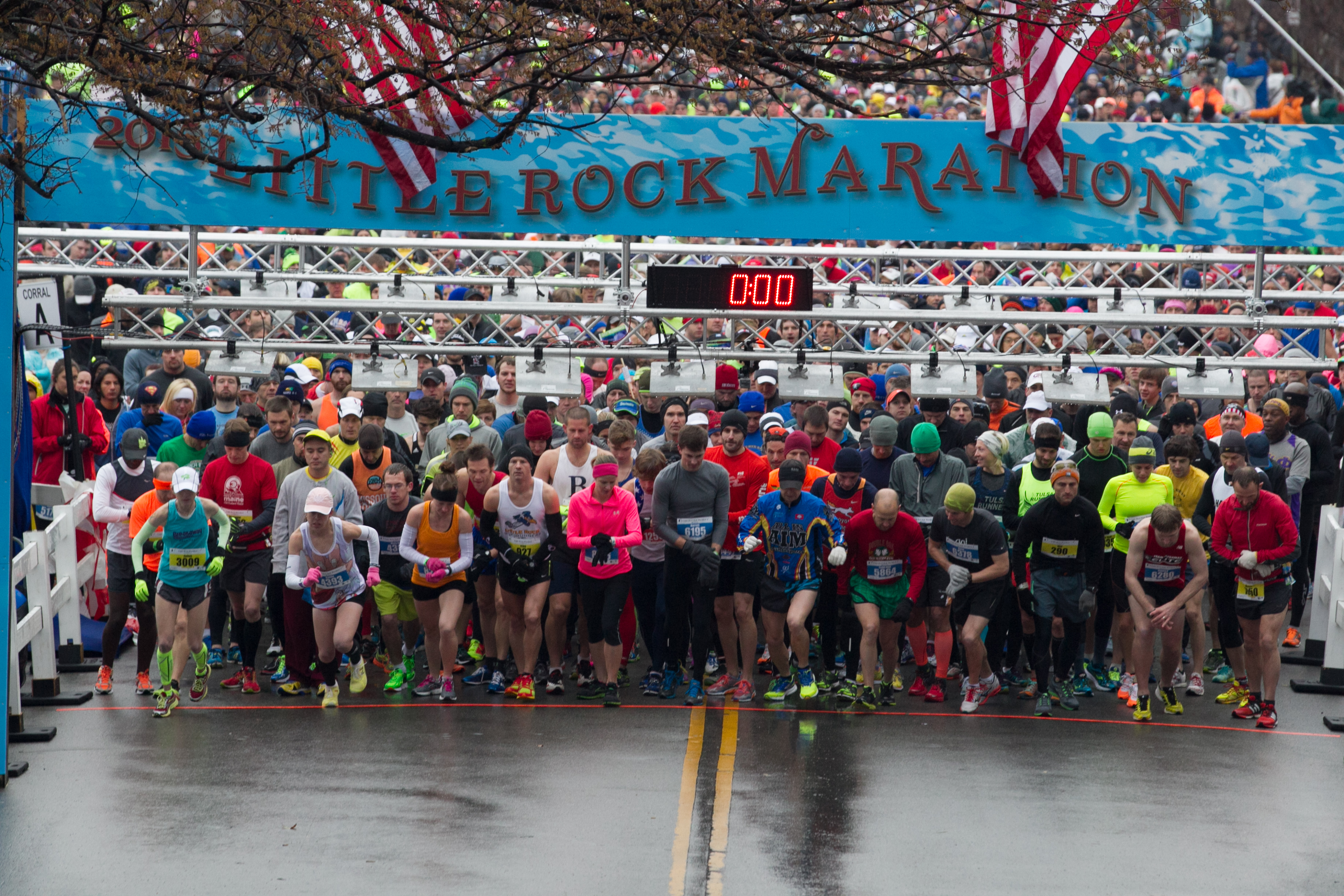
2015 start line

- Marathon

The Little Rock Marathon is a 26.2-mile running/walking tour through the historical sites of Little Rock. The course is certified by the UST&F.

- Half Marathon

The Little Rock Half Marathon (13.1 miles) is run on the same course as the big race, but it is half the distance. The course is certified by the UST&F.

- 10K Race

The Little Rock 10K (6.2 miles) will run with the 5K on the day before the marathon and half-marathon.

- 5K Race

The Little Rock 5K (3.1 miles) will run with the 10K on the day before the marathon and half-marathon. This race is designed for individuals who want an introduction into running or walking without weeks of training.

- Little Rockers Kids Marathon

The Little Rockers Kids Marathon is for children in 1st to 5th grades and gives them an opportunity to finish a marathon over an extended period of time. Prior to race day, participants run or walk 25.2 miles at their own pace and with adult supervision. The last mile is completed on the Little Rock Marathon course and finishes at the official Little Rock Marathon finish line.

- Little Rock Marathon Health & Fitness Expo

The Health and Fitness Expo is the official kickoff of the Little Rock Marathon weekend. The expo is held at the Statehouse Convention Center. Exhibitors sell running/fitness items, give out samples, and distribute their products to participants picking up race packets.

== Little Rock Marathon Training Program ==
Established in 2003, the Official Little Rock Marathon Training Program has helped thousands of athletes (runners, walkers, joggers) cross the finish line. The Little Rock Marathon Training Program is a free, year-round program for those at any skill-level interested in starting a running/walking program, maintaining their base mileage, or training for a race.

The Little Rock Marathon Training Program is for those individuals wanting to:

- Start a running or walking program
- Improve health
- Reduce stress
- Complete your first marathon or half-marathon or achieve a personal best
- Learn more about training safely and avoiding common running/walking injuries
- Have fun and meet new people

== Full Marathon Winners ==
=== Male Winners ===
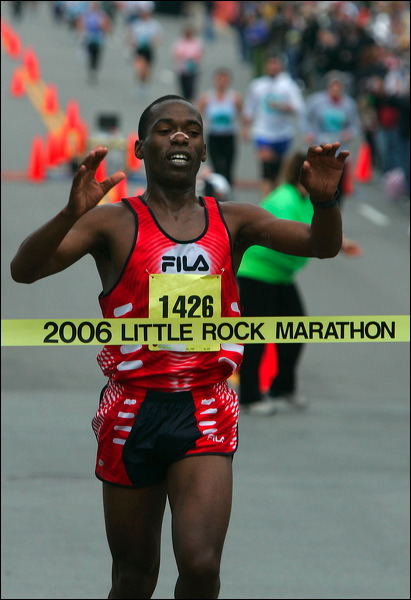
2006 Marathon Top Male Finisher - Charles Kamindo

- 2003, Anatolie Vartosu, 2:36:53, Stamford, CT
- 2004, Glen Mays, 2:34:30, Washington, DC
- 2005, John Weru, 2:24:10, Mountain View, CA
- 2006, Charles Kamindo, 2:19:48, Superior, CO
- 2007, Przemek Bobrowski, 2:27:09, Poland
- 2008, Tamrat Ayalew, 2:24:46, Marietta, GA
- 2009, Augustus Mbusya Kavutu, 2:20:41, Albuquerque, NM
- 2010, Moninda F Marube, 2:29:40, Keller, TX
- 2011, Mark Chepses, 2:24:07, Calle Sierra Morelos
- 2012, Mark Chepses, 2:29:42, Des Moines, IA
- 2013, Mark Chepses, 2:19:45, Des Moines, IA
- 2014, Mark Chepses, 2:25:42, Des Moines, IA
- 2015, Yao Long, 2:44:40, CHANGCHUN, JILIN, China
- 2016, Bryan Morseman, 2:27:15, Bath, NY
- 2017, Adam Bradbury, 2:45:43, Bryant, AR
- 2018, Drew Mueller, 2:32:34, University City, MO
- 2019, Jeremy Provence, 2:42:23, Florence, AL
- 2020, Jeremy Provence, 2:42:47, Florence, AL
- 2021, Joseph Hoch, 2:49:19, Stoughton, WI
- 2022, Cameron Beckett, 2:40:27, Cammack Village, AR
- 2023, Colin Boerger, 2:40:43, Kingston, MA
- 2024, Trevor Uyemura, 2:42:58, Vienna, VA
- 2025, Aaron Soltmann, 2:32:20, Little Rock, AR
- 2026, Benjamin Williams, 2:32:08, Baltimore, MD

=== Female Winners ===
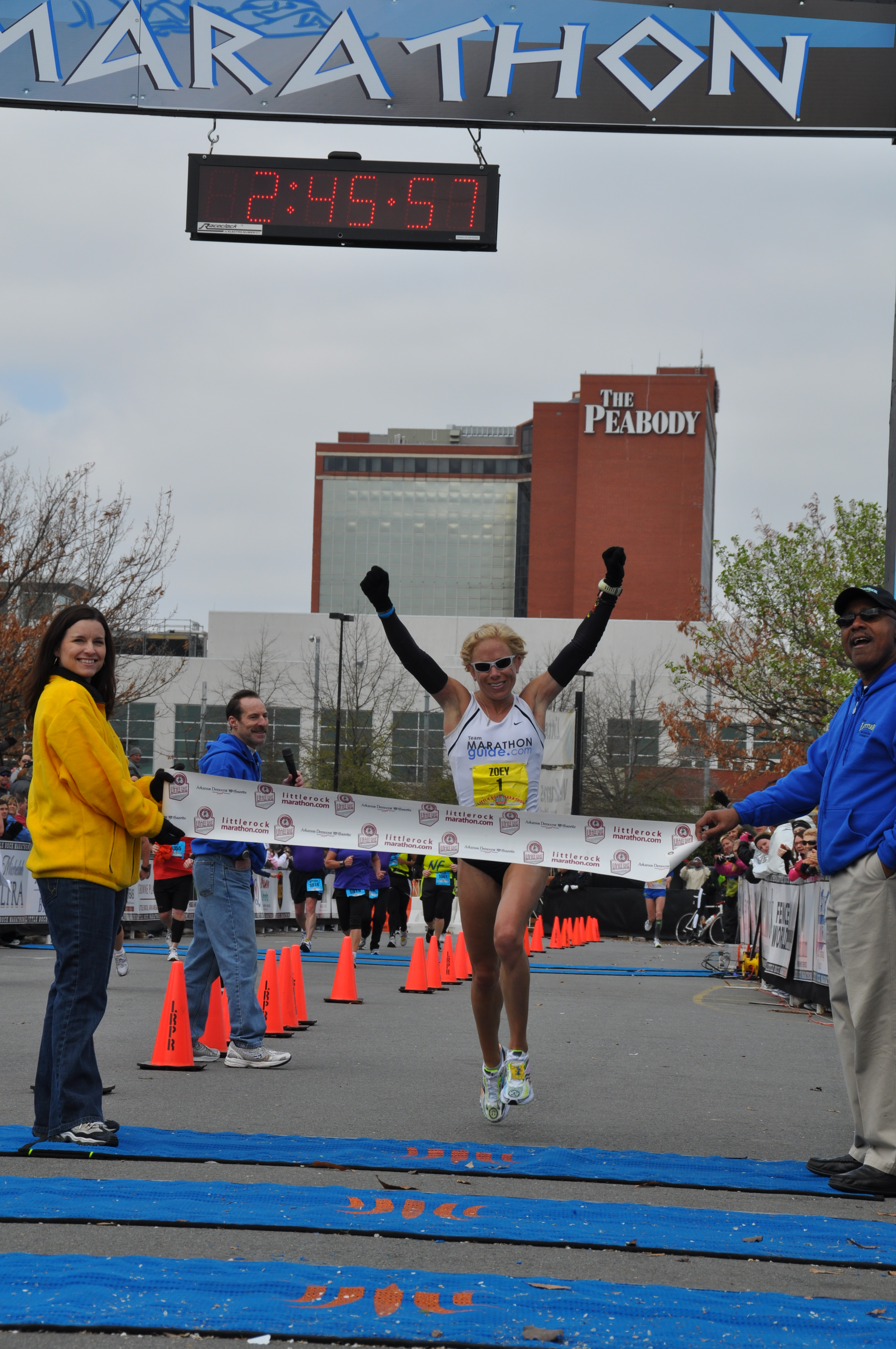
Five-time Little Rock Marathon Winner Leah Thorvilson

- 2003, Joyce Florance, 3:20:25, Bossier City, LA
- 2004, Patricia Langum, 3:17:40, Brooklyn Park, MN
- 2005, Christy Nielsen, 2:58:45, Council Bluffs, IA
- 2006, Claudia Camargo, 2:56:48, Danbury, CT
- 2007, Maria Cleofe' Portilla, 2:47:12, Albuquerque, NM
- 2008, Hellen Rotich, 2:50:33, Manor, TX
- 2009, Leah Thorvilson, 2:44:19, Little Rock, AR
- 2010, Leah Thorvilson, 2:48:28, Little Rock, AR
- 2011, Leah Thorvilson, 2:45:51, Little Rock, AR
- 2012, Leah Thorvilson, 2:37:26, Little Rock, AR
- 2013, Hellen Rotich, 2:47:12, Manor, TX
- 2014, Leah Thorvilson, 2:42:39, Little Rock, AR
- 2015, Angie Zinkus, 2:59:57, Eads, TN
- 2016, Tia Stone, 3:00:23, Searcy, AR
- 2017, Tia Stone, 3:00:44, Searcy, AR
- 2018, Tia Stone, 2:59:13, Searcy, AR
- 2019, Jenny Massanelli, 3:14:42, Little Rock, AR
- 2020, Tia Stone, 3:07:10, Searcy, AR
- 2021, Tia Stone, 3:01:43, Searcy, AR
- 2022, Elizabeth Dollas, 3:02:46, Amesbury, MA
- 2023, Jessy Sorrick, 3:09:54, Columbia, MO
- 2024, Abigayle Money, 2:51:34, Fayetteville, AR
- 2025, Stefanie Rodell, 3:10:58, Mount Pleasant, SC
- 2026, Holly Moser, 2:53:25, Jacksonville, AR
