= Augustus Mbusya Kavutu =

Kenyan marathon runner

Augustus Mbusya Kavutu (born December 31, 1977) is a Kenyan long-distance runner and marathoner who has won several long-distance races and finished in the top ten of multiple international marathons. He ran one of the fastest half-marathons in the world in 2003, clocking 1:01:19.

== Running career ==
Kavutu ran his first marathon on June 12, 1999, in Stockholm. In Sweden, he also ran several races on the track. In 2002, he ran a 13:50 5,000 meters and 28:23.51 10,000 meters. He built his early career winning many races in Scandinavia, where he was living. In 2002, he was the champion of the famed Lidingöloppet, a 30K run in Lidingö, Sweden, which draws thousands of runners. He finished the race in 1:36:51, the seventh-fastest time in event history.

The same year, he placed third (a short distance behind winner Mustafa Mohamed) in the largest annual running competition in the world (in terms of entries): The Göteborgsvarvet (Swedish: jœtɛbɔ̂rjsvarvɛt).

At the start of 2003, Kavutu ran the Kenya Armed Forces 30K road race. He went out fast, pacing the other Kenyan runners through the 25K mark. But at the end, he lost steam and was passed by Onesmus Kilonzo and Boniface Usisivu, but hung on to beat Getuli Bayo and finish in third with a time of 1:30:48.

On March 2, 2003, Kavutu completed the Los Angeles Marathon in sixth place out of nearly 17,000 contestants in a time of 2:12:39. He returned in 2008 and ran with three other Kenyans (led by winner Mark Yatich) to a fourth-place finish in 2:16:01, setting him up for a cash prize. In December, he was in Dallas with his training partner, Nephat Kinyaniui. The two Kenyans paced the field at the 34th Dallas Marathon in sub-freezing temps. They finished just seconds apart for first and second place. That year, he also finished in the top 15 at the New York City marathon.

During 2004, Kavutu became well known in the marathon world by winning the Twin Cities Marathon with a 2:13:33 run, just seconds ahead of Ukrainian Mykola Antonenko. He did not lead the race, but stayed back from the pacesetters until overcoming Elarbi Khattabi near the 25th mile. He won $25,000 for first place. The prize might not have come to him, as the marathon organizers had planned to only give prize money to US citizens as a way of showing support for national runners. But the community pushed back, and the organizers agreed it would be best to award the cash to whoever won, regardless of nationality.

He was in Hamburg, Germany in 2005 for the running of the 11th Hamburg Half Marathon (German:Hamburg Halbmarathon). He beat the competition, which included Carsten Schütz and other Kenyan runners, for the win in 1:05:57. He was also top five in the Scotiabank Toronto Waterfront Marathon on a course-record-breaking day, where he ran 2:18:16 to finish in front of Danny Kassap and thousands of others.

Kavutu's best personal time in the marathon also came in 2005: 2:11:39 at the Standard Chartered Dubai Marathon.

He was fifth in the 2006 Edinburgh Marathon and second in the 2006 Hanover Marathon.

He was back in Dubai on a cool morning in January 2007, where he lined up with Kenyans and Ethiopians to race the flat marathon course. William Rotich would win in near record time (and Askale Magarsa did set a woman's course record); Kavutu would take 10th in 2:14:25, just seconds behind James Koskei. In April, he ran to a third-place finish at the international Madrid Marathon in 2:14:54. Following this victory, Kavatu won third place at the 2007 Twin Cities Marathon in 2:21:13—this time behind Antonenko.

Also in 2007, he won the Fort-de-France Half Marathon and came in second in a Barbados half. Between 2008 and 2009, Kavutu finished in the top 10 at LA Marathon, Nashville Marathon, Istanbul Marathon, Houston Marathon, San Diego Marathon, and Las Vegas Marathon. And he won the 2009 Little Rock Marathon.

He returned to the Twin Cities Marathon again in 2009 to cross the finish line in second place with a 2:13:03 time behind Jason Hartmann.

In 2010, he entered the Košice Peace Marathon in eastern Slovakia. He finished in the top 10 with a time of 2:23:45. During his career, his total earnings equaled $106,210.

== Early and personal life ==
August Mbusya Kavutu was born in Kenya on December 31, 1977. After the Timmins Golden Trails Festival in 2007, Kavutu revealed that he sends his race money home to his family and community in Kenya in order to provide them with clean water and electricity.
