= Daisuke Uekado =

Japanese long-distance runner

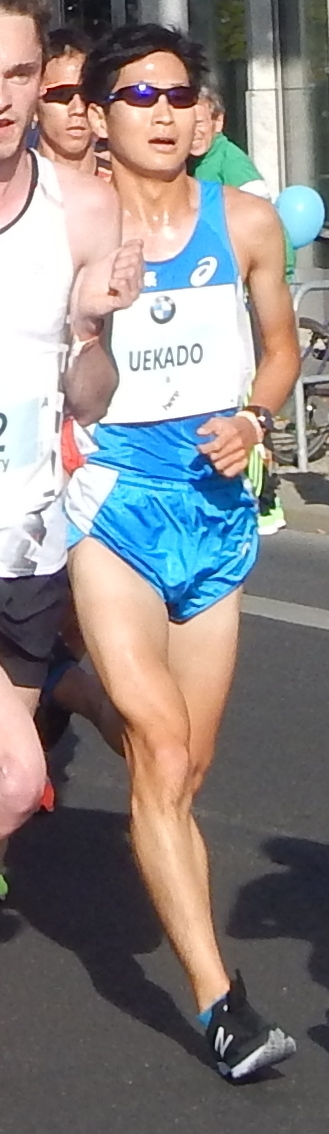
Uekado at Berlin Marathon 2018

Daisuke Uekado (born December 11, 1993) is a Japanese long-distance runner.

Uekado won the 2016 Kyoto Marathon.

He competed at the 2018 IAAF World Half Marathon Championships, where he finished 82nd.

Uekado finished 8th at the 2018 Berlin Marathon.

He has qualified for the Japan Olympic Trials for the 2020 Olympics.
