= 2018 Berlin Marathon =

Marathon race

45th Berlin Marathon
- Venue: Berlin, Germany
- Dates: 16 September 2018

Champions
- Men: Eliud Kipchoge (2:01:39 WR)
- Women: Gladys Cherono (2:18:11)

The 2018 Berlin Marathon was the 45th edition of the Berlin Marathon. The marathon took place in Berlin, Germany, on 16 September 2018 and was the fourth World Marathon Majors race of the year. The men's race was won by Eliud Kipchoge, who set a new world record time of 2:01:39. The women's race was won by Gladys Cherono in a time of 2:18:11.

== Men's race ==
Eventual winner Eliud Kipchoge began the race with three pacemakers dedicated to him. After 5 km the gap between him and the Kipsang group was 9 seconds. After 15 km two of the pacemakers were unable to continue pacing him. The remaining pacemaker dropped out after 25 kilometres, leaving Kipchoge to cover the final 17 km alone. Kipchoge had planned to run with a pacemaker through 30 km; this adversity "was unfortunate," he reflected post-race, "but I had to believe". Kipchoge accelerated, covering the second half (1:00:33) of the race faster than the first half (1:01:06). In sunny weather conditions, the temperature was 14 °C (57 °F) during the start and 18 °C (64 °F) when Kipchoge crossed the finish line.

Before the race, Kipchoge stated that he planned to run a new personal best. The prize money he made for his Berlin run was €120,000, consisting of €30,000 for finishing in less than 2:04 hours, €40,000 for the win and a further €50,000 for setting a new world record. The world record set during this run was the 8th world record in 20 years in the men's marathon at the Berlin marathon. During the run, Kipchoge used Nike Zoom Vaporfly 4% shoes.

The pace during the run averaged to 2:53/km (4:38/mile). The second half of the race in 1:00:33, and the last 10 km was covered in 28:33.

It was the most evenly paced marathon ever recorded, with the fastest 5 km interval covered in 14:18 and the slowest in 14:37, a difference of only 19 seconds.

== Results ==
=== Men ===
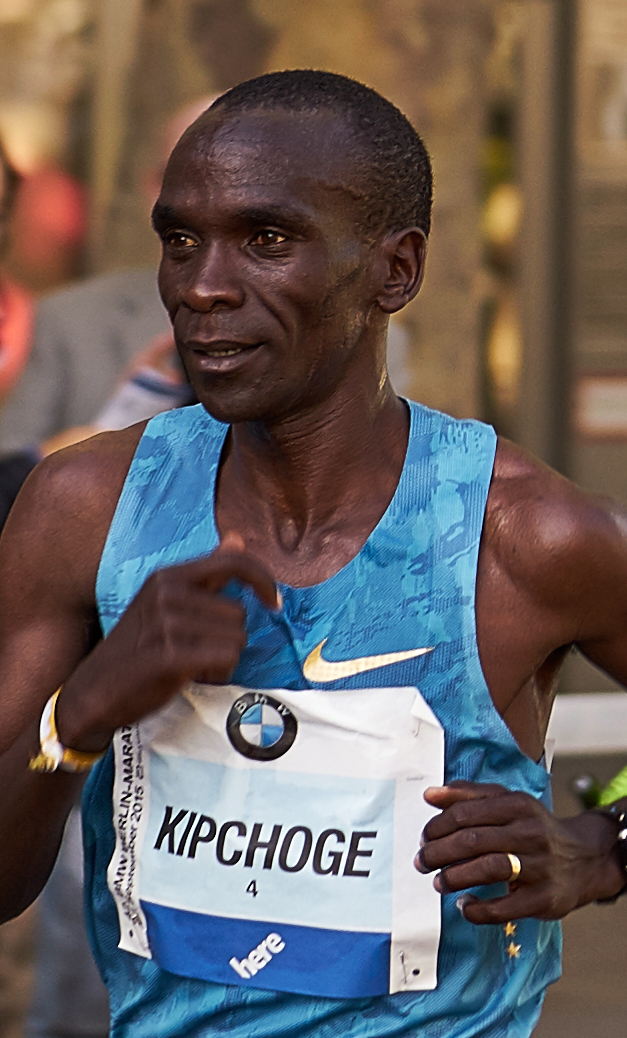
Eliud Kipchoge in the 2015 Berlin Marathon

Position	Athlete	Nationality	Time
1st place, gold medalist(s)	Eliud Kipchoge	Kenya	2:01:39 WR
2nd place, silver medalist(s)	Amos Kipruto	Kenya	2:06:23
3rd place, bronze medalist(s)	Wilson Kipsang	Kenya	2:06:48
4	Shogo Nakamura	Japan	2:08:16
5	Zersenay Tadese	Eritrea	2:08:46
6	Yuki Sato	Japan	2:09:18
7	Okubay Tsegay	Eritrea	2:09:56
8	Daisuke Uekado	Japan	2:11:07
9	Willy Canchanya	Peru	2:12:57
10	Bart van Nunen	Netherlands	2:13:09
11	Wellington Da Silva	Brazil	2:13:43
12	Vagner Da Silva Noronha	Brazil	2:14:57
13	Fernando Cabada	United States	2:15:00
14	Nick van Peborgh	Belgium	2:15:04
15	Thomas De Bock	Belgium	2:15:19
16	Kenta Murayama	Japan	2:15:37
17	Brendan Martin	United States	2:16:26
18	Malcolm Hicks	New Zealand	2:16:28
19	Paul Martelletti	New Zealand	2:16:39
20	Julian Spence	Australia	2:17:29
21	Luis Orta	Venezuela	2:17:48
22	Gary O'Hanlon	Ireland	2:19:06
23	Gerd Devos	Belgium	2:19:14
24	Berihun Wuve	Israel	2:19:45
25	Brady Threlfall	Australia	2:19:53
26	Valentin Harwardt	Germany	2:19:54
27	Antonio Cardona	Puerto Rico	2:20:18
28	Jeffrey Seelaus	United States	2:20:52
29	Ruben Sança	Cape Verde	2:21:01
30	Dirk Hübner	Germany	2:21:01

=== Women ===
Position	Athlete	Nationality	Time
1st place, gold medalist(s)	Gladys Cherono	Kenya	2:18:11
2nd place, silver medalist(s)	Ruti Aga	Ethiopia	2:18:34
3rd place, bronze medalist(s)	Tirunesh Dibaba	Ethiopia	2:18:55
4	Edna Kiplagat	Kenya	2:21:18
5	Mizuki Matsuda	Japan	2:22:23
6	Helen Tola	Ethiopia	2:22:48
7	Honami Maeda	Japan	2:25:23
8	Carla Salomé Rocha	Portugal	2:25:27
9	Miyuki Uehara	Japan	2:25:46
10	Rei Ohara	Japan	2:27:29
11	Rachel Cliff	Canada	2:28:53
12	Lyndsay Tessier	Canada	2:30:47
13	Inés Melchor	Peru	2:32:09
14	Andrea Deelstra	Netherlands	2:32:41
15	Dawn Grunnagle	United States	2:34:56
16	Emma Spencer	United States	2:37:05
17	Cristina Jordán	Spain	2:37:14
18	Teresa Montrone	Italy	2:37:35
19	Caitlin Phillips	United States	2:37:48
20	Matea Parlov	Croatia	2:38:05
21	Arianne Raby	Canada	2:39:37
22	Catherine Watkins	Canada	2:40:11
23	Alexandra Cadicamo	United States	2:40:37
24	Tomomi Sawahata	Japan	2:40:50
25	Stephanie Davis	United Kingdom	2:41:16
26	Séverine Hamel	France	2:41:34
27	Amanda Nurse	United States	2:41:48
28	Rachel Hannah	Canada	2:42:57
29	Sarah Klein	Australia	2:43:29
30	Marie Zanderson	United States	2:44:27
