= Thomas De Bock =

Belgian long-distance runner

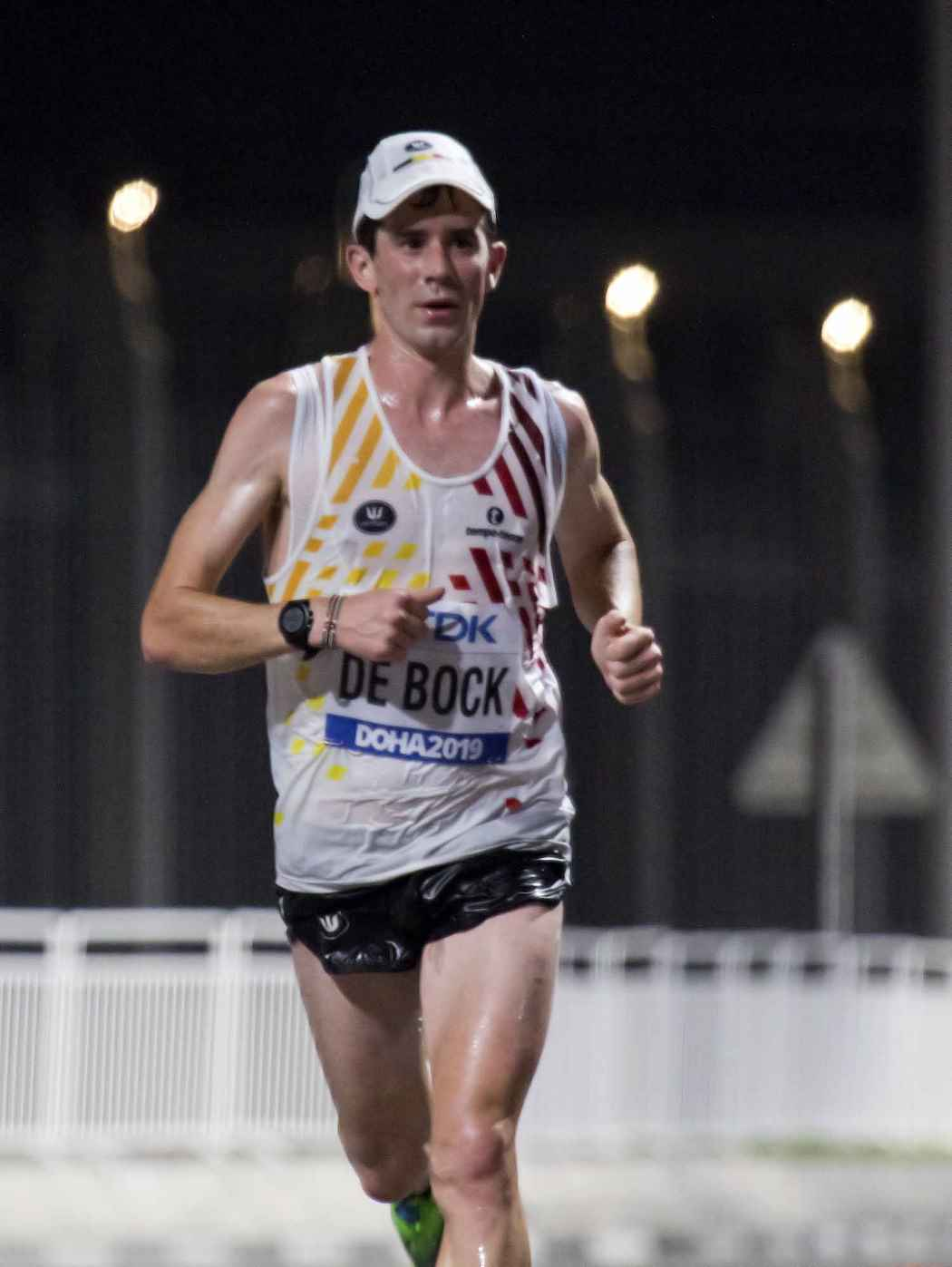
- Thomas De Bock in 2019

Personal information
- Born: 20 August 1991 (age 34)

Sport
- Country: Belgium
- Sport: Long-distance running
Medal record
Men's long-distance running
Belgian Athletics Championships
Silver medal – second place	2018 Brussels	5000 m

Thomas De Bock (born 20 August 1991) is a Belgian long-distance runner. In 2019, he competed in the men's marathon at the 2019 World Athletics Championships held in Doha, Qatar. He finished in 42nd place.

== Career ==
In 2017, he represented Belgium at the 2017 Summer Universiade, held in Taipei, Taiwan, in the men's half marathon event. He did not finish his race.

He won the silver medal in the men's 5000 metres event at the 2018 Belgian Athletics Championships held in Brussels, Belgium. In the same year, he also finished in 15th place in the 2018 Berlin Marathon held in Berlin, Germany.

In 2019, he finished in 22nd place in the 2019 London Marathon held in London, United Kingdom.

== Competition record ==
Year	Competition	Venue	Position	Event	Notes
Representing Belgium
2018	Berlin Marathon	Berlin, Germany	15th	Marathon	2:15:19
2019	London Marathon	London, United Kingdom	22nd	Marathon	2:14:45
2019	World Championships	Doha, Qatar	42nd	Marathon	2:21:13
2022	World Championships	Eugene, United States	30th	Marathon	2:11:54
