= Fyodor Shutov =

Russian long-distance runner

Personal information
- Born: 10 February 1986 (age 39)

Sport
- Country: Russia
- Sport: Long-distance running

Fyodor Shutov (born 10 February 1986) is a Russian long-distance runner. In 2019, he competed in the men's marathon at the 2019 World Athletics Championships held in Doha, Qatar. He finished in 35th place with a time of 2:18:58.
