= Leah Thorvilson =

American racing cyclist (born 1979)

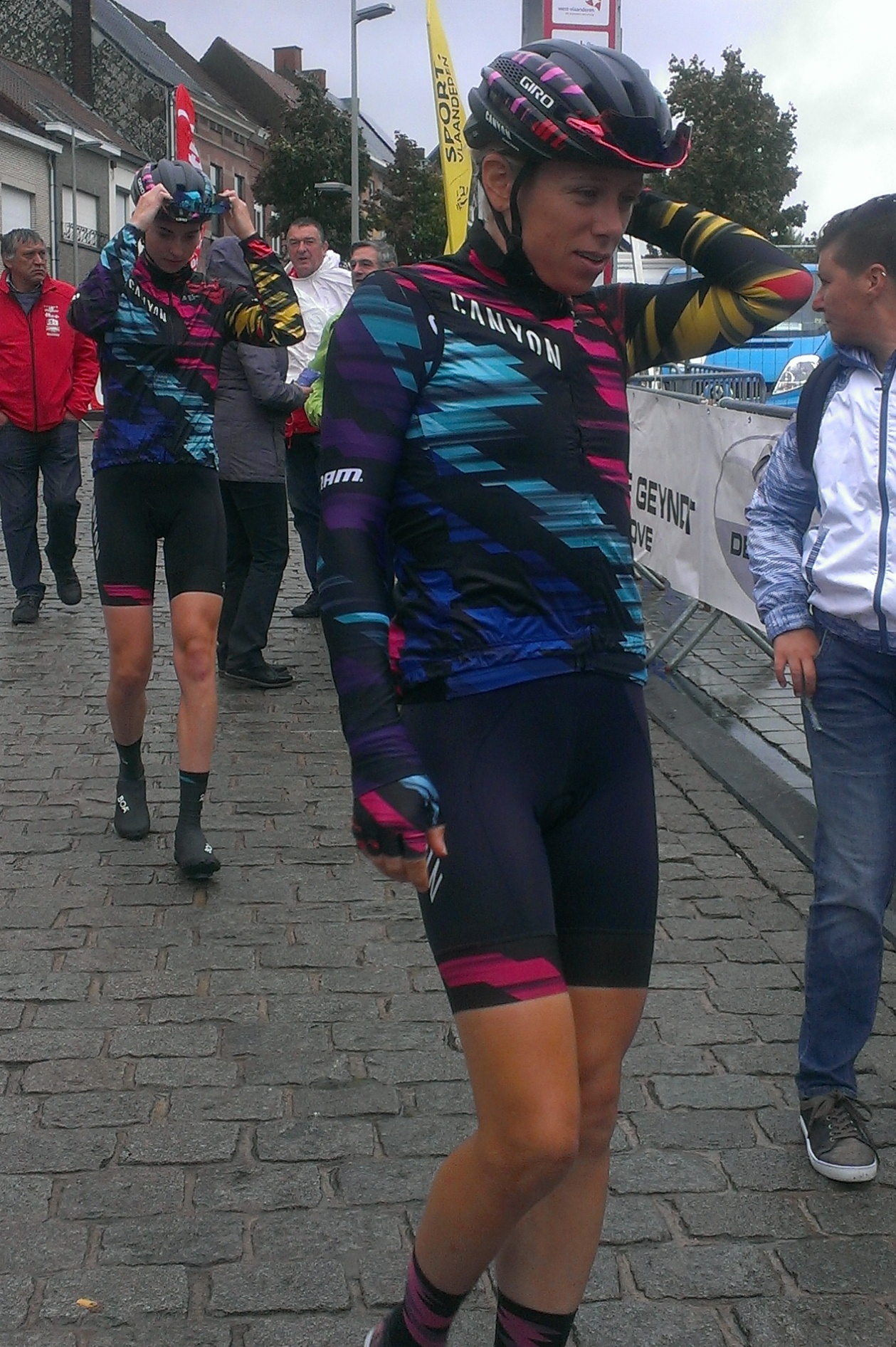

Personal information
- Full name: Leah Thorvilson
- Born: January 9, 1979 (age 47)

Cycling career
- Sport: Cycling
- Current team: Amy D Foundation
- Discipline: Road
- Role: Rider

Amateur teams
- 2016: Zwift Academy
- 2019–: Amy D Foundation

Professional team
- 2017–2018: Canyon//SRAM

Leah Thorvilson (born January 9, 1979) is an American racing cyclist, who currently rides for American amateur team Amy D Foundation. Thorvilson also competed as a long-distance runner, who specialized in the marathon, winning the Walt Disney World Marathon in 2011.

She grew up in Robbinsdale, Minnesota. In 2012, Thorvilson qualified to run in the US Olympic Team Marathon Trials where she finished with a time of 2:42:09. On March 4, 2012, Thorvilson won the Little Rock Marathon for the fourth year in a row with a personal best time of 2:37:26. On April 28, 2012 Thorvilson won the Frisco Railroad Run 50-Mile Race in Willard, Missouri with a time of 6:00:31. This is the fourth-fastest 50-miler by a female ever behind only Ann Trason, Donna Perkins, and Marcy Schwam. Thorvilson now lives and trains in Little Rock, Arkansas.

In December 2016 it was announced that Thorvilson would ride for the Canyon//SRAM team for the 2017 season after emerging as the winner of the Zwift Academy program, beating 1,200 other competitors in the process.

== Races ==
- 2012 Frisco Railroad Run 50 Miler 6:00:31 (The world's fourth-fastest 50-miler by a female)
- 2012 US Olympic Team Marathon Trials 2:42:09
- 2012 Little Rock Marathon 2:37:26 *Women's Course Record, New Marathon PR
- Lost Dutchman Marathon 2:47:16 *Women's Course Record
- Tallahassee Marathon 2:40:06 *Women's Course Record
- 2011 Walt Disney World Marathon 2:42:11 *Women's Winner
- 2011 Midsouth Marathon 2:57:14
- Great Cranberry Island 50K 3:32:00 *Women's Course Record
