= Caden Shields =

New Zealand long-distance runner

Personal information
- Born: 7 August 1988 (age 37)

Sport
- Country: New Zealand
- Sport: Long-distance running

Caden Shields (born 7 August 1988) is a New Zealand long-distance runner. In 2019, he competed in the men's marathon at the 2019 World Athletics Championships held in Doha, Qatar. He finished in 30th place.
