= Malcolm Hicks =

New Zealand long-distance runner

Personal information
- Full name: Malcolm Andrew Hicks
- Born: 19 October 1987 (age 38) Auckland, New Zealand
- Height: 184 cm (6 ft 0 in)

Sport
- Country: New Zealand
- Sport: Long-distance running

Malcolm Andrew Hicks (born 19 October 1987) is a New Zealand long-distance runner. In 2019, he competed in the men's marathon at the 2019 World Athletics Championships held in Doha, Qatar. He finished in 27th place. He also represented New Zealand at the Tokyo 2020 Olympics.

== Career ==
In 2018, he finished in 18th place in the Berlin Marathon held in Berlin, Germany.

In 2019, Hicks ran the Metro Group Marathon in Dusseldorf, Germany, where he was second in 2:13:51. Hicks' other marathon of the year was at the 2019 World Championships in Athletics in Doha, Qatar, where he finished 27th in 2:17:45.

On 23 February 2020, Hicks ran the Seville Marathon held in Seville, Spain. He placed 22nd in a personal best time of 2:10:04. This performance qualified him to represent his country at the 2020 Tokyo Olympic Games men's marathon.

On 8 August 2021, Hicks competed in the Tokyo Olympic Games Marathon along with compatriot Zane Robertson. Hicks was placed 64th in 2:23:12 and Robertson was 36th in 2:17:04, behind the winner Eliud Kipchoge.

Hicks has retired from international competition, but continues to race nationally in New Zealand. In 2023, he won the Rotorua Marathon.

Hicks is also a geotechnical engineer, graduating from the University of Canterbury in 2011 with a master's thesis on the analysis of wind turbine foundations using Multichannel Analysis of Surface Waves.

== Competition record ==
Year	Competition	Venue	Position	Event	Notes
Representing New Zealand
2018	Berlin Marathon	Berlin, Germany	18th	Marathon	2:16:28
2019	METRO Marathon Düsseldorf	Düsseldorf, Germany	2nd	Marathon	2:13:51
2019	World Championships	Doha, Qatar	27th	Marathon	2:17:45
2020	Seville Marathon	Seville, Spain	22nd	Marathon	2:10:04
2021	Olympic Games	Sapporo, Japan	64th	Marathon	2:23:12
