= Seeing Is Believing (organization) =

Global Initiative

Seeing is Believing (SiB) was a global initiative to tackle avoidable blindness that took place from 2003-2020. SiB was a partnership between Standard Chartered Bank PLC and the International Agency for the Prevention of Blindness (IAPB) (registered charity, No. 110059).

Phase IV – “A New Vision” was launched on World Sight Day 2008. A major international effort was to set in place structures for the treatment of avoidable blindness now and for the future.

The programme was one of the beneficiaries of the money raised by the Gaborone City Marathon in Gaborone, Botswana.

== Impact ==
Over seventeen years, from 2003 until 2020, more than US$104.2 million, fundraised by Standard Charter, enabled Seeing is Believing to improve eye-care health and prevent avoidable blindness, changed the lives more than 250 million people across thirty-eight countries in regions across Africa, Asia, the Middle East, and South America. The ambitious program comprised 28,000 employees who provided sight-saving surgeries, like cataract surgery, for 5.1 million people, offered 37.5 million eye examinations, distributed 1.78 million eye glasses, and trained 374,578 health care workers in eye care.

=== Partnership with SightSavers ===
Sightsavers, an international non-governmental organisation, worked with Seeing is Believing worked in nine countries (Bangladesh, Ghana, India, Kenya, Nigeria, Pakistan, Sierra Leone, Sri Lanka, Tanzania, Uganda, and Zambia over the seventeen years.
