= Tanzania at the 1983 World Championships in Athletics =

- Flag of Tanzania
- WA code: TAN

in Helsinki, Finland August 7–14, 1983
- Competitors: 8 (7 men and 1 woman) in 6 events
- Medals: Gold 0 Silver 0 Bronze 0 Total 0

World Championships in Athletics appearances
- 1983; 1987; 1991; 1993; 1995; 1997; 1999; 2001; 2003; 2005; 2007; 2009; 2011; 2013; 2015; 2017; 2019; 2022; 2023

Tanzania competed at the 1983 World Championships in Athletics in Helsinki, Finland, from August 7 to 14, 1983.

== Men ==
Track and road events

Athlete	Event	Heat		Quarterfinal		Semifinal		Final	
Athlete	Event	Result	Rank	Result	Rank	Result	Rank	Result	Rank
Adram M'Kumi	400 metres	49.22	41	Did not advance					
Jimmy Igohe	1500 metres	3:48.58	42	—		Did not advance			
Zakariah Barie	10,000 metres	28:22.06	21	—		Did not advance			
Gidamis Shahanga	10,000 metres	27:46.93	3 Q	—				28:01.93	5
Juma Ikangaa	Marathon	—						2:13:11	15
Agapius Masong	Marathon	—						2:10:42	5

Field events

Athlete	Event	Qualification		Final	
Athlete	Event	Distance	Position	Distance	Position
Wilfredo Almonte	javelin throw	72.92	17	Did not advance	

== Women ==
Track and road events

Athlete	Event	Heat		Quarterfinal		Semifinal		Final	
Athlete	Event	Result	Rank	Result	Rank	Result	Rank	Result	Rank
Leticia Athanas	400 metres	56.54	25 q	56.92	22	Did not advance			
