= Okubay Tsegay =

Eritrean long-distance runner

Personal information
- Born: 1 January 1986 (age 39)

Sport
- Country: Eritrea
- Sport: Long-distance running

Okubay Tsegay (born 1 January 1986) is an Eritrean long-distance runner. In 2019, he competed in the men's marathon at the 2019 World Athletics Championships held in Doha, Qatar. He did not finish.

In 2018, he competed in the 2018 Berlin Marathon. He finished in 7th place. He also finished in 7th place in the 2021 Berlin Marathon.
