= Tanzania at the 2009 World Championships in Athletics =

- WA code: TAN

in Berlin
- Competitors: 10 (9 men, 1 woman)
- Medals: Gold 0 Silver 0 Bronze 0 Total 0

World Championships in Athletics appearances
- 1983; 1987; 1991; 1993; 1995; 1997; 1999; 2001; 2003; 2005; 2007; 2009; 2011; 2013; 2015; 2017; 2019; 2022; 2023

Tanzania competed at the 2009 World Championships in Athletics from 15–23 August in Berlin.

== Team selection ==
Track and road events

Event	Athletes	
Event	Men	Women
5000 metres	Fabiano Joseph Naasi; Marco Joseph	Zakia Mrisho Mohamed
10,000 metres	Dickson Marwa; Ezekiel Jafari; Fabiano Joseph Naasi	
Marathon	Getuli Bayo; Lucian Desdery Hombo; Christopher Isengwe; Andrea Silvini; Phaustin Baha Sulle	

== Results ==
=== Men ===
Track and road events

Event	Athletes	Heats		Final	
Event	Athletes	Result	Rank	Result	Rank
5000 m	Fabiano Joseph Naasi	DNS		did not advance	
5000 m	Marco Joseph	13:53.67	31	did not advance	
10,000 m	Dickson Marwa	-		28:18.00 SB	16
10,000 m	Ezekiel Jafari	-		28:45.34	21
10,000 m	Fabiano Joseph Naasi	-		28:04.32 SB	13
Marathon	Getuli Bayo	-		2:25:52 SB	57
Marathon	Lucian Desdery Hombo	-		DNF	
Marathon	Christopher Isengwe	-		DNF	
Marathon	Andrea Silvini	-		2:28:48	60
Marathon	Phaustin Baha Sulle	-		2:17:11	28

=== Women ===
Track and road events

Event	Athletes	Heats		Final	
Event	Athletes	Result	Rank	Result	Rank
5000 m	Zakia Mrisho Mohamed	15:25.09 q SB	15	15:31.73	15
