= Gilbert Mutandiro =

Zimbabwean long-distance runner

Personal information
- Born: 6 April 1984 (age 42)

Sport
- Country: Zimbabwe
- Sport: Track and field
- Event: long-distance running
- Updated on 29 August 2015

Gilbert Mutandiro (born 6 April 1984) is a male Zimbabwean long-distance runner. He competed in the marathon event at the 2015 World Championships in Athletics in Beijing, China.

== See also ==
- Zimbabwe at the 2015 World Championships in Athletics
