= 2011 World Championships in Athletics – Men's long jump =

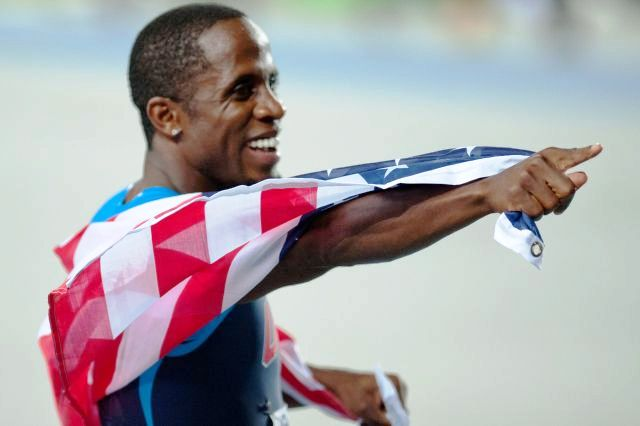
Dwight Phillips victory celebration at Daegu

Official Video

The Men's long jump event at the 2011 World Championships in Athletics was held at the Daegu Stadium on September 1 and 2.

Defending champion Dwight Phillips had not done well early in the season, only finishing tenth in the USA Outdoor Track and Field Championships. But as defending champion, he was given the automatic entry into the meet. On his qualifying jump he showed the first sign of life, jumping a season best 8.32 to lead qualifying. Of the rest of the field, only Mitchell Watt achieved an automatic qualifier. Will Claye achieved a rare feat by qualifying for final in both the Long Jump and Triple Jump.

In the final, Phillips almost matched his qualifying jump with an 8.31 to take the early lead. Ngonidzashe Makusha came close with an 8.29 in the same round. Mitchell Watt bested the early leaders with an 8.33 in the second round, but not before Phillips had jumped an 8.45 to separate from the field. Nobody was able to improve after that.

After the event, Phillips celebrated by showing his assigned bib number 1111, significant for his first-place finish in four World Championships.

== Medalists ==
Gold	Silver	Bronze
Dwight Phillips; United States	Mitchell Watt; Australia	Ngonidzashe Makusha; Zimbabwe

== Records ==
Prior to the competition, the established records were as follows.

World record	Mike Powell (USA)	8.95	Tokyo, Japan	30 August 1991
Championship record	Mike Powell (USA)	8.95	Tokyo, Japan	30 August 1991
World leading	Mitchell Watt (AUS)	8.54	Stockholm, Sweden	29 July 2011
African record	Godfrey Khotso Mokoena (RSA)	8.50	Madrid, Spain	4 July 2009
Asian Record	Mohammed Al-Khuwalidi (KSA)	8.48	Sotteville, France	2 July 2006
North, Central American and Caribbean record	Mike Powell (USA)	8.95	Tokyo, Japan	30 August 1991
South American record	Irving Saladino (PAN)	8.73	Hengelo, Netherlands	24 May 2008
European record	Robert Emmiyan (URS)	8.86	Tsaghkadzor, Soviet Union	22 May 1987
Oceanian record	Mitchell Watt (AUS)	8.54	Stockholm, Sweden	29 July 2011

== Qualification standards ==
A standard	B standard
8.20	8.10

== Schedule ==
Date	Time	Round
September 1, 2011	11:35	Qualification
September 2, 2011	19:20	Final

== Results ==
=== Qualification ===
Qualification: Qualifying Performance 8.15 (Q) or at least 12 best performers (q) advance to the final.

Rank	Group	Athlete	Nationality	#1	#2	#3	Result	Notes
1	A	Dwight Phillips	United States	8.32			8.32	Q, SB
2	A	Mitchell Watt	Australia	6.43	8.15		8.15	Q
3	A	Christian Reif	Germany	x	8.13	x	8.13	q
4	B	Ngonidzashe Makusha	Zimbabwe	8.05	7.83	8.11	8.11	q
5	B	Sebastian Bayer	Germany	8.11	-	-	8.11	q
6	B	Marcos Chuva	Portugal	x	8.10	x	8.10	q
7	B	Will Claye	United States	7.83	7.94	8.09	8.09	q
8	A	Aleksandr Menkov	Russia	8.07	x	-	8.07	q
9	A	Yahya Berrabah	Morocco	x	8.03	8.05	8.05	q
10	B	Luvo Manyonga	South Africa	7.77	7.72	8.04	8.04	q
11	A	Kim Deok-hyeon	South Korea	7.86	7.99	8.02	8.02	q, SB
12	A	Chris Tomlinson	Great Britain & N.I.	7.95	7.84	8.02	8.02	q
13	A	Marquise Goodwin	United States	7.92	7.78	8.02	8.02	
14	B	Louis Tsatoumas	Greece	8.01	7.89	x	8.01	
15	B	Greg Rutherford	Great Britain & N.I.	8.00	x		8.00	
15	A	Godfrey Khotso Mokoena	South Africa	x	x	8.00	8.00	
17	A	Ignisious Gaisah	Ghana	x	7.92	7.78	7.92	
18	B	Eusebio Cáceres	Spain	7.60	7.90	7.91	7.91	
19	B	Tyrone Smith	Bermuda	x	7.79	7.91	7.91	
20	A	Damar Forbes	Jamaica	x	x	7.91	7.91	
21	B	Fabrice Lapierre	Australia	7.80	7.89	7.76	7.89	
22	B	Irving Saladino	Panama	x	x	7.84	7.84	
23	A	Luis Felipe Méliz	Spain	7.80	7.69	7.82	7.82	
24	A	Robert Crowther	Australia	7.74	7.64	7.67	7.74	
25	B	Raymond Higgs	Bahamas	x	7.72	x	7.72	
26	A	Jorge McFarlane	Peru	x	x	7.66	7.66	
27	A	Michel Tornéus	Sweden	x	7.62	7.65	7.65	
28	A	Salim Sdiri	France	7.49	7.58	7.48	7.58	
29	B	Lin Ching-hsuan	Chinese Taipei	7.30	x	x	7.30	
30	B	Kristinn Torfason	Iceland	5.52	6.25	7.17	7.17	
31	B	Trevell Quinley	United States	7.09	x	x	7.09	
32	B	Su Xiongfeng	China	7.03			7.03	
	B	Henry Dagmil	Philippines	x	x	x	NM	
	A	Mohamed Fathalla Difallah	Egypt	x	x	x	NM	
	A	Povilas Mykolaitis	Lithuania	x	x	x	NM	
	B	Stanley Gbagbeke	Nigeria				DNS	

=== Final ===
Rank	Athlete	Nationality	#1	#2	#3	#4	#5	#6	Result	Notes
1st place, gold medalist(s)	Dwight Phillips	United States	8.31	8.45	x	-	x	x	8.45	SB
2nd place, silver medalist(s)	Mitchell Watt	Australia	x	8.33	4.90	7.79	x	8.06	8.33	
3rd place, bronze medalist(s)	Ngonidzashe Makusha	Zimbabwe	8.29	8.15	8.14	8.00	8.07	x	8.29	
4	Yahya Berrabah	Morocco	8.03	8.23	x	x	x	x	8.23	
5	Luvo Manyonga	South Africa	8.21	x	7.82	x	x	x	8.21	
6	Aleksandr Menkov	Russia	7.74	8.19	x	x	8.07	x	8.19	
7	Christian Reif	Germany	7.90	8.19	x	7.98	x	7.97	8.19	
8	Sebastian Bayer	Germany	8.17	8.06	8.13	8.04	7.91	8.02	8.17	SB
9	Will Claye	United States	8.08	7.98	8.10				8.10	
10	Marcos Chuva	Portugal	8.05	x	7.99				8.05	
11	Chris Tomlinson	Great Britain & N.I.	7.86	x	7.87				7.87	
	Kim Deok-hyeon	South Korea							DNS	
