= Zimbabwe at the 2011 World Championships in Athletics =

- WA code: ZIM
- National federation: National Athletic Association of Zimbabwe

in Daegu
- Competitors: 4
- Medals: Gold 0 Silver 0 Bronze 1 Total 1

World Championships in Athletics appearances
- 1983; 1987; 1991; 1993; 1995; 1997; 1999; 2001; 2003; 2005; 2007; 2009; 2011; 2013; 2015; 2017; 2019; 2022; 2023

Zimbabwe competed at the 2011 World Championships in Athletics from 27 August to 4 September in Daegu, South Korea.

== Team selection ==
A team of 4 athletes was announced to represent the country in the event.

== Medalists ==
The following competitor from Zimbabwe won a medal at the Championships

Medal	Athlete	Event
Bronze	Ngonidzashe Makusha	Long jump

== Results ==
=== Men ===
Athlete	Event	Preliminaries		Heats		Semifinals		Final	
Athlete	Event	Time Width Height	Rank	Time Width Height	Rank	Time Width Height	Rank	Time Width Height	Rank
Ngonidzashe Makusha	100 metres			10.31	11 Q	10.27	17	Did not advance	
Gabriel Mvumvure	100 metres			10.63	43	Did not advance			
Gabriel Mvumvure	200 metres			21.11	41	Did not advance			
Cuthbert Nyasango	Marathon							2:15:56 SB	16
Ngonidzashe Makusha	Long jump	8.11	4					8.29	3rd place, bronze medalist(s)

=== Women ===
Athlete	Event	Preliminaries		Heats		Semifinals		Final	
Athlete	Event	Time Width Height	Rank	Time Width Height	Rank	Time Width Height	Rank	Time Width Height	Rank
Tandiwe Nyathi	1500 metres			4:32.79 PB	34	Did not advance			
