= Merhawi Kesete =

Eritrean long-distance runner

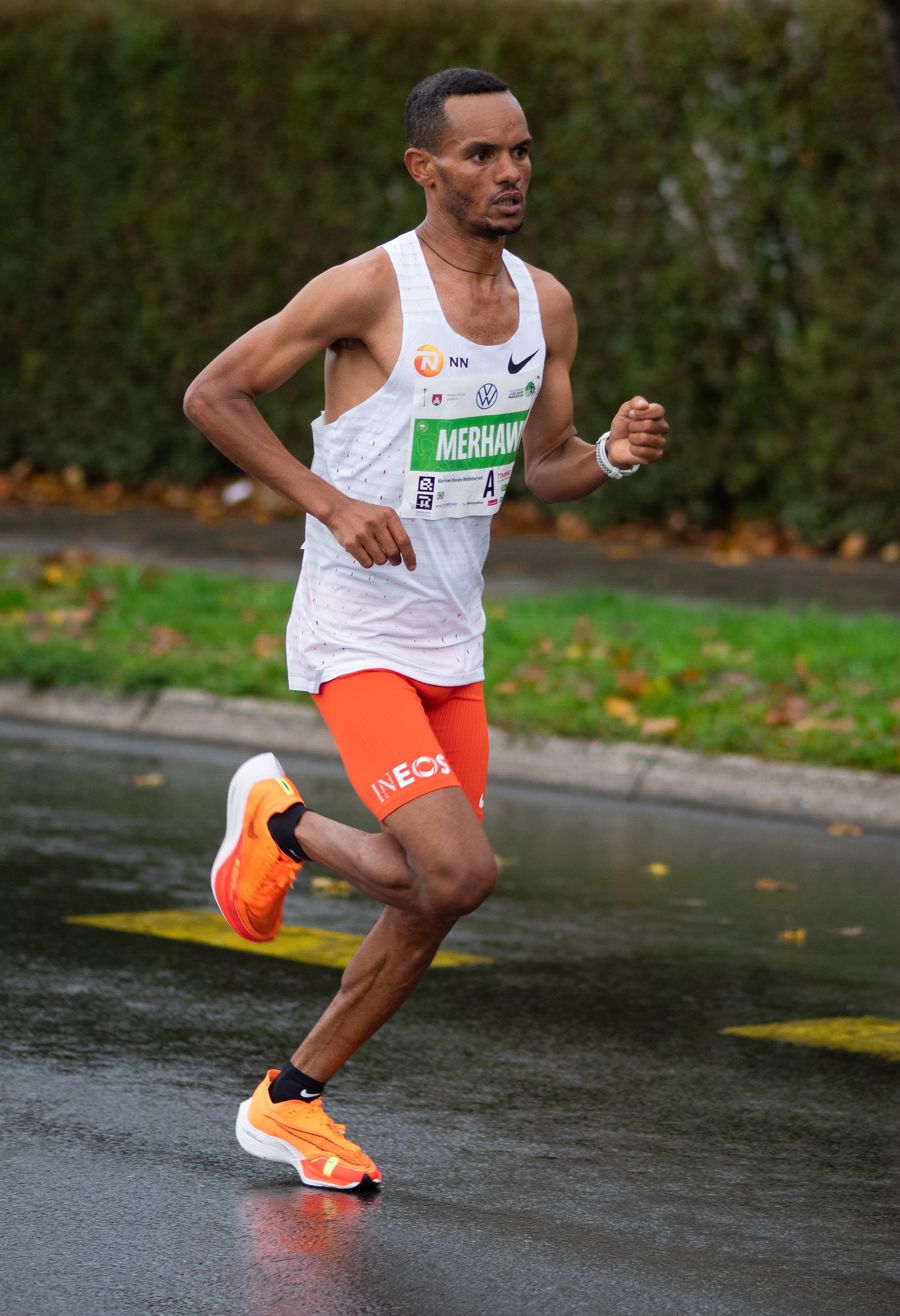
- Kesete on Ljubljana Marathon (2022)

Personal information
- Born: 1 January 1986 (age 39)

Sport
- Country: Eritrea
- Sport: Long-distance running

Merhawi Kesete (born 1 January 1986) is an Eritrean long-distance runner. In 2019, he competed in the men's marathon at the 2019 World Athletics Championships held in Doha, Qatar. He did not finish.

In 2015, he won the Hamburg Half Marathon and he set a new course record with a time of 1:00:52. In 2015, he also won the Ústí nad Labem Half Marathon held in Ústí nad Labem, Czech Republic.
