= Vagner da Silva Noronha =

Brazilian long-distance runner

Personal information
- Born: 5 July 1984 (age 41)
- Home town: Caetés, Pernambuco

Sport
- Country: Brazil
- Sport: Long-distance running

Vagner da Silva Noronha (born 5 July 1984 in Caetés, Pernambuco) is a Brazilian long-distance runner. In 2019, he competed in the men's marathon at the 2019 World Athletics Championships held in Doha, Qatar. He finished in 51st place.
