= Augustino Paulo Sulle =

Tanzanian long-distance runner

Personal information
- Born: 13 October 1997 (age 28)

Sport
- Country: Tanzania
- Sport: Long-distance running

Augustino Paulo Sulle (born 13 October 1997) is a Tanzanian long-distance runner. In 2019, he competed in the men's marathon at the 2019 World Athletics Championships held in Doha, Qatar. He did not finish his race.
