= Julian Spence (runner) =

Australian long-distance runner

Personal information
- Born: 7 March 1986 (age 40)

Sport
- Country: Australia
- Sport: Long-distance running

Julian Spence (born 7 March 1986) is an Australian long-distance runner. In 2019, he competed in the men's marathon at the 2019 World Athletics Championships held in Doha, Qatar. He finished in 39th place.

In 2018, he competed in the 2018 Berlin Marathon held in Berlin, Germany.

Spence is a co-host on the Inside Running Podcast.
