= Zimbabwe at the 2015 World Championships in Athletics =

- WA code: ZIM

in Beijing
- Competitors: 5
- Medals: Gold 0 Silver 0 Bronze 0 Total 0

World Championships in Athletics appearances
- 1983; 1987; 1991; 1993; 1995; 1997; 1999; 2001; 2003; 2005; 2007; 2009; 2011; 2013; 2015; 2017; 2019; 2022; 2023

Zimbabwe competed at the 2015 World Championships in Athletics in Beijing, China, from 22 to 30 August 2015.

== Results ==
(q – qualified, NM – no mark, SB – season best)

=== Men ===
Track and road events

Athlete	Event	Heat		Semifinal		Final	
Athlete	Event	Result	Rank	Result	Rank	Result	Rank
Tatenda Tsumba	200 metres	21.21	7	Did not advance			
Cephas Pasipamiri	Marathon	—				2:25.05 SB	30
Gilbert Mutandiro	Marathon	—				2:31:35	37
Cuthbert Nyasango	Marathon	—				2:22.15 SB	23

=== Women ===
Track and road events

Athlete	Event	Heat		Semifinal		Final	
Athlete	Event	Result	Rank	Result	Rank	Result	Rank
Olivia Mugove Chitate	5000 metres	16:34.70 PB	12	—		did not advance	
