= Ngonidzashe Makusha =

Zimbabwean sprinter and athletics competitor (born 1987)

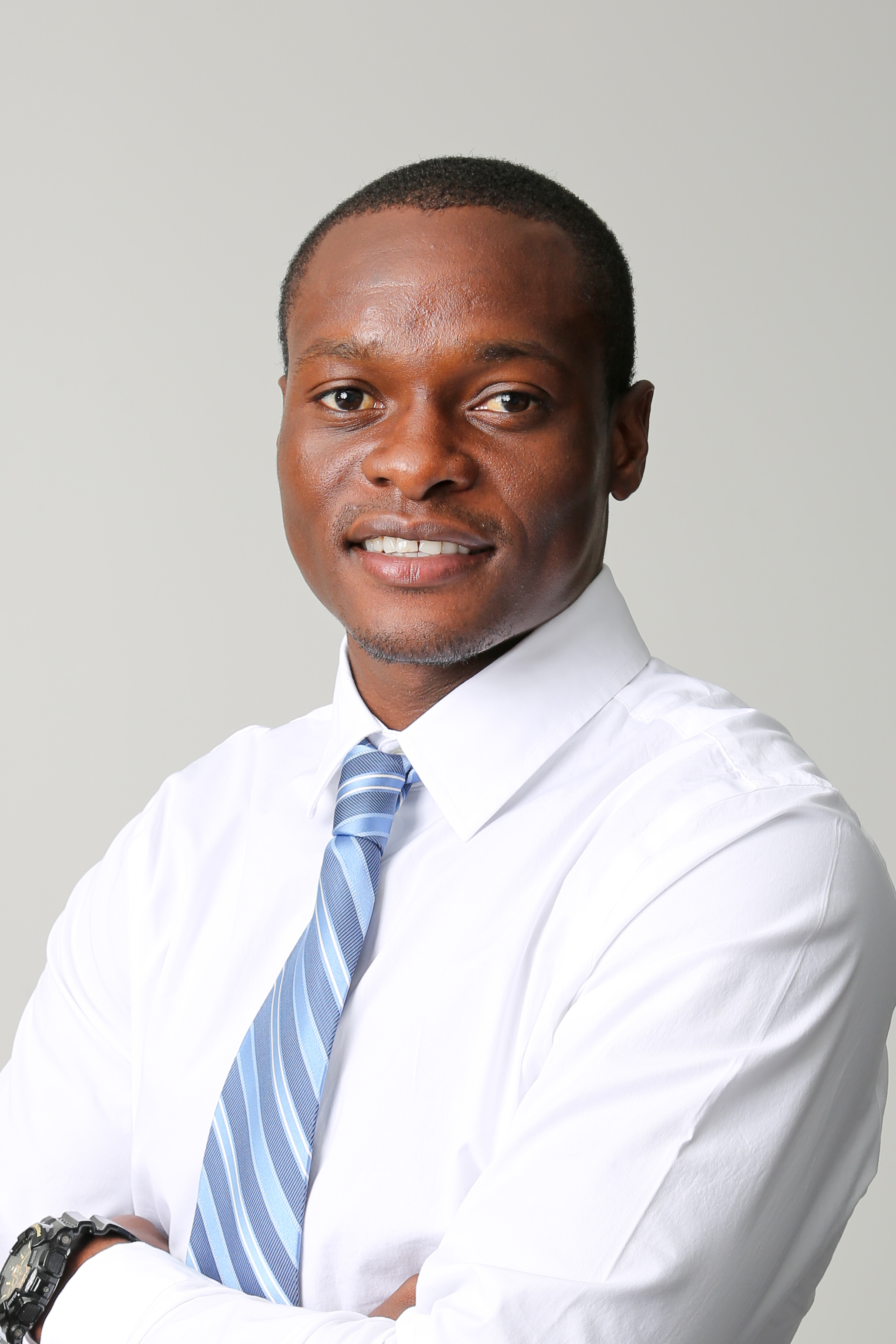

Personal information
- Born: 11 March 1987 (age 39)
- Education: Florida State university (B.A); Drake University (M.S)

Sport
- Sport: Track and field
- Events: Sprints, long jump
- College team: Florida State Seminoles
- Turned pro: 2011
- Retired: 2017
- Now coaching: Drake university. Assistant Coach (2017-2019). University of California, Davis. Head coach (2019-

Achievements and titles
- Olympic finals: 2008 Beijing; Long Jump, 4th
- Personal bests: Outdoor; 100 m: 9.89 (Des Moines 2011); Long Jump: 8.40m (Des Moines 2011); Indoor; Long Jump: 8.21m (Blacksburg 2009)
Medal record
Men's athletics
Representing Zimbabwe
World Championships
Bronze medal – third place	2011 Daegu	Long jump
All-Africa Games
Bronze medal – third place	2007 Algiers	4×100 m relay
Representing Florida State Seminoles/ Atlantic Coast Conference
NCAA Indoor Track and Field Championships
Bronze medal – third place	2008 Fayetteville	Long Jump
Silver medal – second place	2008 Fayetteville	Team
Bronze medal – third place	2009 College Station	Team
Gold medal – first place	2011 College Station	Long Jump
NCAA Outdoor Track and Field Championships
Gold medal – first place	2008 Des Moines	Long Jump
Gold medal – first place	2008 Des Moines	Team
Gold medal – first place	2009 Fayetteville	Long Jump
Silver medal – second place	2009 Fayetteville	Team
Gold medal – first place	2011 Des Moines	Long Jump
Gold medal – first place	2011 Des Moines	100m
Gold medal – first place	2011 Des Moines	4x100m Relay
Silver medal – second place	2011 Des Moines	Team

Ngonidzashe Makusha (born 11 March 1987) is a Zimbabwean sprinter and long jumper. He is the national record holder over 100 m and long jump for Zimbabwe with 9.89 s (+1.3 m/s) and 8.40 m (0.0 m/s), respectively. Both performances were achieved during the 2011 NCAA Division I Championships in Des Moines, Iowa where he completed the 100 m - long jump double gold. Makusha was one of the only four, now five, athletes to win the 100 m - long jump double gold at the NCAA championships. The four others are DeHart Hubbard (1925), Jesse Owens (1935 & 1936), Carl Lewis (1981), and Jarrion Lawson (2016).

In 2011, Makusha was named the men's winner of The Bowerman which is awarded to the top collegiate track & field athlete of the year.

== Early career ==
Makusha started his athletics career at Mandedza High School in Seke, Zimbabwe. In July 2006 at the Zone Six Youth Games in Windhoek, Namibia, Makusha achieved results of 7.87 metres in the long jump, 14.90 metres in the triple jump, 10.64 seconds in the 100 metres and 21.57 seconds in the 200 metres. The next month he entered in both long jump and the 100 metres at the 2006 World Junior Championships. In the 100 metres, he reached the semi-final, where he was knocked out with a time of 10.84 seconds. He reached the final in the long jump event, but finished twelfth and last.

The next year Makusha competed at the 2007 All-Africa Games, where he won a bronze medal in the 4 x 100 metres relay, together with his teammates Gabriel Mvumvure, Brian Dzingai and Lewis Banda. He also competed in long jump and 100 metres, achieving 7.69 metres and 10.52 seconds in the two events.

== Collegiate, professional and international career ==
Makusha enrolled at Florida State University in Fall of 2007. He quickly improved his long jumping, and won bronze in the event at the 2008 NCAA Division I Indoor Track and Field Championships in Fayetteville with a mark of 7.97 metres. In May 2008, he finally broke the eight-metre barrier, setting a new Zimbabwean record of 8.16 metres in Tallahassee, Florida. The following month the freshman won the NCAA Championship in the long jump with another Zimbabwean record, this time with 8.30 metres, and subsequently contributed to Florida State's national team title. He commented that "This is one of my dreams and it just came true". The victory was the first in any individual event at the NCAA championships for the Florida State University. It was also the best mark for the Florida State program history as well as a stadium record.

Makusha then represented Zimbabwe at the 2008 Summer Olympics in Beijing. In the long jump competition he secured a place in the final round with his first qualifying jump, which measured 8.14 metres. In the first round of the final, Makusha jumped 8.19 metres. With the mark he was in the lead until the third round, when Irving Saladino jumped 8.21 metres. Makusha did not improve further, and was overtaken by Godfrey Khotso Mokoena and Ibrahim Camejo, who leapt 8.24 and 8.20, respectively, and thus finished fourth, while Saladino won the event with a mark of 8.34 metres.

The 2008–09 indoor season saw Makusha achieving a personal best time in the 60 metres, running in 6.68 seconds in January in Blacksburg. In February in the same city, he improved this to 6.60 seconds. He also jumped a Zimbabawean national indoor record of 8.21 metres. At the 2009 NCAA Indoor Track & Field Championships, Makusha got injured during the 60 metres and finished in 13th place, running 8.44 seconds, and could not compete in the long jump. The injury kept him out for much of the outdoor season, but came back just in time to win the 2009 outdoor title in the long jump with a mark of 8.11 metres.

Makusha only competed in two meets in 2010 due to injury.

In his final season at Florida State, Makusha won the 2011 indoor long jump title with a mark of 8.14 metres. That June, Makusha won three national titles, the 100 metres, long jump and 4x100 metre relay, at the 2011 NCAA Division I Outdoor Track and Field Championships with marks of 9.89 seconds, 8.40 metres, and 38.75 seconds, respectively. His performance in the 100 metres set an NCAA record that stood for six years. This is also the 100m national record for Zimbabwe. At the conclusion of the season, Makusha was named the winner of the Bowerman, the highest accolade in collegiate track & field, NCAA Male Track Athlete of the Year, and ACC Athlete of the Year. His 100m-long jump double gold performance at the NCAA Championship is heralded as one of the greatest ever.

After graduating from Florida State with a Bachelor's Degree in Applied Economics, Makusha turned professional and signed a four-year sponsorship contract (2011–15) with Chinese sports apparel company Li-Ning.

Makusha took bronze in the long jump at the 2011 World Championships with a leap of 8.29m.

Makusha placed first in the long jump competition at the 2014 Globen Galan with a mark of 8.18m.

Makusha retired in 2017.

In August 2021, Makusha was inducted into the Florida State Athletics Hall of Fame.

== Coaching career ==
Makusha started his coaching career while still a professional athlete. He was a volunteer assistant coach for Florida State for six seasons (2012–17).

He then spent two seasons (2018, 2019) as an assistant coach at Drake working with the sprints, jumps and hurdles athletes, while pursuing a Master's Degree in Educational Leadership.

On July 31, 2019, Makusha was named the men's and women's track & field head coach at UC Davis.

Awards
Preceded by (United States) Ashton Eaton	The Bowerman (men's winner); 2011	Succeeded by (Canada) Cam Levins
