= Ezekiel Jafary =

Tanzanian athlete

Personal information
- Born: 30 December 1989 (age 36)

Sport
- Country: Tanzania
- Sport: Track and field
- Event: Marathon

Ezekiel Jafary (born 30 December 1989) is a Tanzanian long-distance runner who specialises in the marathon. He competed in the marathon event at the 2015 World Championships in Athletics in Beijing, China, placing 27th in 2:23:43. In 2017 he competed in the World Championships marathon held in London, placing 12th with a time of 2:14:05.
