= Stephano Gwandu Huche =

Tanzanian long-distance runner

Personal information
- Nationality: Tanzanian
- Born: 15 November 1990 (age 35)

Sport
- Sport: Long-distance running
- Event: Marathon

Stephano Gwandu Huche (born 15 November 1990) is a Tanzanian long distance runner. He competed in the men's marathon at the 2017 World Championships in Athletics, placing 38th with a time of 2:20:05. In 2019, he competed in the men's marathon at the 2019 World Athletics Championships held in Doha, Qatar. He did not finish his race.
