= Zimbabwe at the 1983 World Championships in Athletics =

- Flag of Zimbabwe
- WA code: ZIM

in Helsinki, Finland August 7–14, 1983
- Competitors: 2 (1 man and 1 woman) in 4 events
- Medals: Gold 0 Silver 0 Bronze 0 Total 0

World Championships in Athletics appearances
- 1983; 1987; 1991; 1993; 1995; 1997; 1999; 2001; 2003; 2005; 2007; 2009; 2011; 2013; 2015; 2017; 2019; 2022; 2023

Zimbabwe competed at the 1983 World Championships in Athletics in Helsinki, Finland, from August 7 to 14, 1983.

== Men ==
Track and road events

Athlete	Event	Heat		Quarterfinal		Semifinal		Final	
Athlete	Event	Result	Rank	Result	Rank	Result	Rank	Result	Rank
Christopher Madzokere	100 metres	10.84	45	Did not advance					
Christopher Madzokere	200 metres	21.68	33 Q	21.55	30	Did not advance			
Christopher Madzokere	400 metres	47.17	27 Q	46.74	23	Did not advance			

== Women ==
Field events

Athlete	Event	Qualification		Final	
Athlete	Event	Distance	Position	Distance	Position
Maryline Adam	Discus throw	45.22	18	Did not advance	
