= Ngonidzashe Ncube =

Zimbabwean long-distance runner

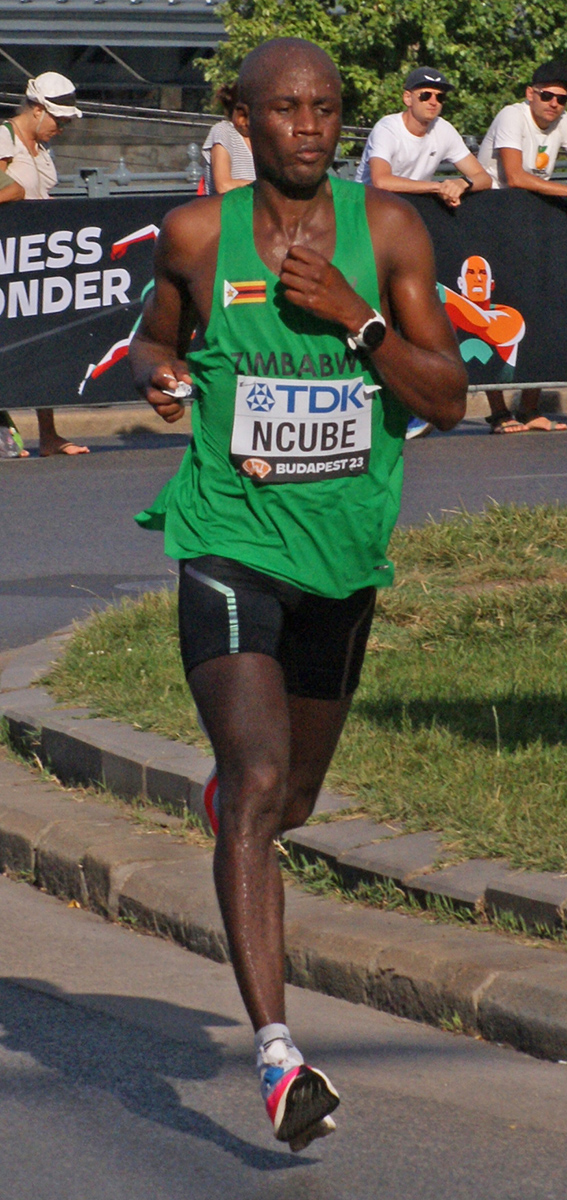

Personal information
- Nationality: Zimbabwean
- Born: 12 July 1986 (age 39) Zimbabwe

Sport
- Country: Zimbabwe
- Sport: Track and field
- Event: Marathon

Ngonidzashe Ncube (born 12 July 1986) is a Zimbabwean long-distance runner who specialises in the marathon. He represented Zimbabwe at the 2019 World Athletics Championships, competing in men's marathon.
