= Munyaradzi Jari =

Zimbabwean marathon runner

Personal information
- Nationality: Zimbabwean
- Born: 2 April 1990 (age 35) Zimbabwe

Sport
- Country: Zimbabwe
- Sport: Track and field
- Event: Marathon

Munyaradzi Jari (born 2 April 1990) is a Zimbabwean long-distance runner who specialises in the marathon. He represented Zimbabwe at the 2019 World Athletics Championships, competing in men's marathon.
