= Isaac Mpofu =

Zimbabwean long-distance runner

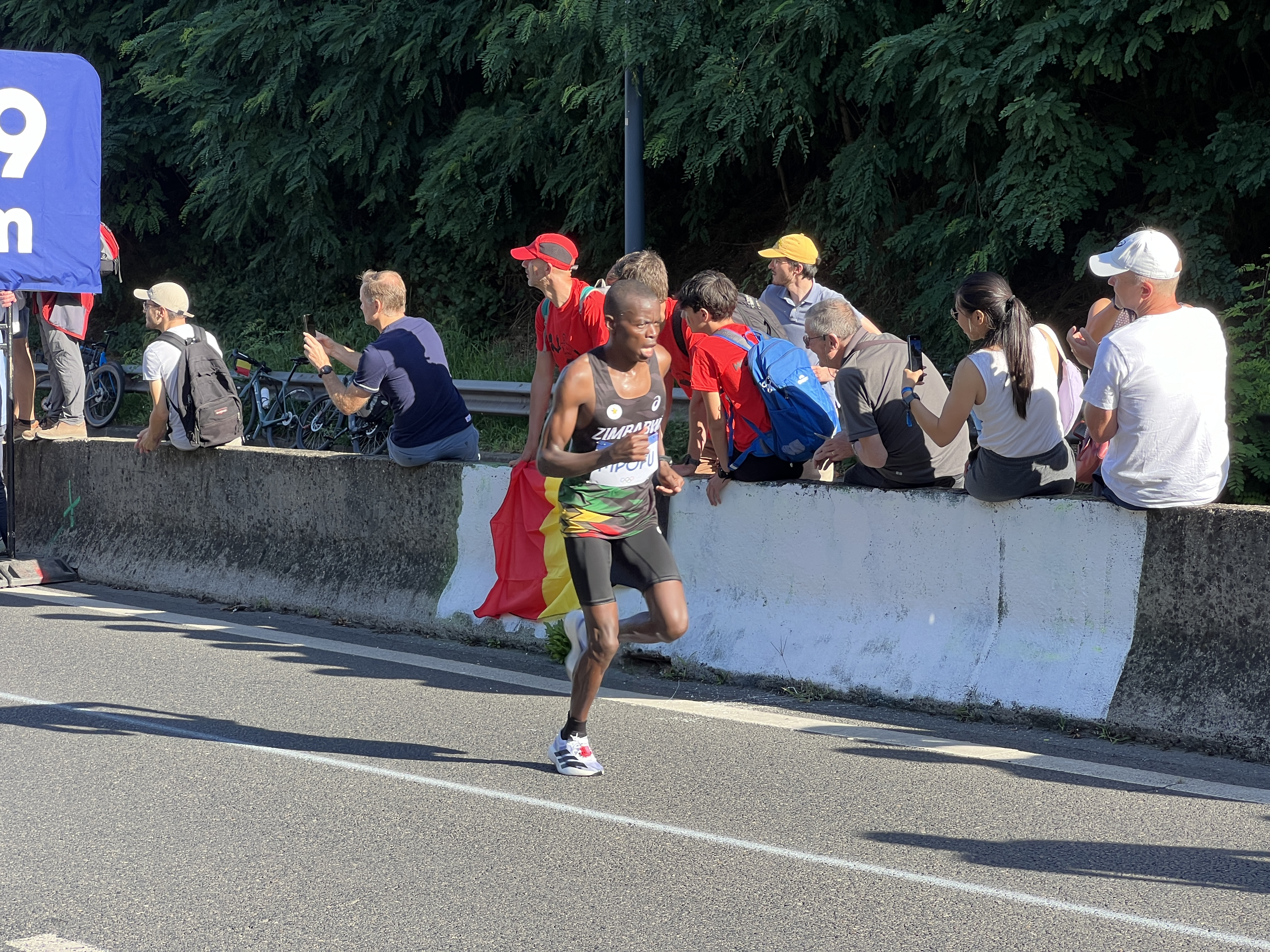
- Mpofu at the 2024 Summer Olympics

Personal information
- Nationality: Zimbabwean
- Born: 20 August 1988 (age 37) Zimbabwe

Sport
- Country: Zimbabwe
- Sport: Track and field
- Event: Marathon

Achievements and titles
- Personal bests: 2:07:56 (Eugene 2022) NR
Medal record
Men's athletics
Representing Zimbabwe
African Games
Bronze medal – third place	2023 Accra	Half marathon

Isaac Mpofu (born 20 August 1988) is a Zimbabwean long-distance runner who specialises in the marathon. He represented Zimbabwe at the 2019 World Athletics Championships, competing in the men's marathon. He finished in 52nd place. He also represented Zimbabwe at the 2022 World Athletics Championships, in the men's marathon where he finished in 10th place.
