= Uruguay at the World Athletics Championships =

- Flag of Uruguay
- WA code: URU
- Medals: Gold 0 Silver 0 Bronze 1 Total 1

World Athletics Championships appearances (overview)
- 1983; 1987; 1991; 1993; 1995; 1997; 1999; 2001; 2003; 2005; 2007; 2009; 2011; 2013; 2015; 2017; 2019; 2022; 2023; 2025

Uruguay has taken part in all editions of the World Athletics Championships, having won a bronze medal in 2025 by former Great-Britain junior runner Júlia Paternain in the women's marathon, in its only second try at the distance.

== Medalists ==
Medal	Name	Year	Event
Bronze	Julia Paternain	2025 Tokyo	Women's marathon

=== By event ===
Event	Gold	Silver	Bronze	Total
Marathon	0	0	1	1
Totals (1 entries)	0	0	1	1

=== By gender ===
Gender	Gold	Silver	Bronze	Total
Women	0	0	1	1
Men	0	0	0	0

== See also ==
- Uruguay at the Olympics
- Uruguay at the Paralympics
