= Nepal at the 2009 World Championships in Athletics =

- WA code: NEP

in Berlin
- Competitors: 2
- Medals: Gold 0 Silver 0 Bronze 0 Total 0

World Championships in Athletics appearances
- 1983; 1987; 1991; 1993; 1995; 1997; 1999; 2001; 2003; 2005; 2007; 2009; 2011; 2013; 2015; 2017; 2019; 2022; 2023

Nepal had planned to compete at the 2009 World Championships in Athletics from 15 to 23 August in Berlin, but both of its entrants dropped out of the competition.

== Team selection ==
Event	Athletes	
Event	Men	Women
100 metres		Keshari Chaudhari
1500 metres	Hari Kumar Rimal	

== Results ==
While Chaudhari and Rimal both were entered in the competition, neither competed.
