= Uruguay at the 2025 World Athletics Championships =

- Flag of Uruguay
- WA code: URU

in Tokyo, Japan 13 September 2025 – 21 September 2025
- Competitors: 9 (5 men and 4 women)
- Medals Ranked 41st: Gold 0 Silver 0 Bronze 1 Total 1

World Athletics Championships appearances (overview)
- 1983; 1987; 1991; 1993; 1995; 1997; 1999; 2001; 2003; 2005; 2007; 2009; 2011; 2013; 2015; 2017; 2019; 2022; 2023; 2025

Uruguay competed at the 2025 World Athletics Championships in Tokyo, Japan, from 13 to 21 September 2025.

Julia Paternain won the nation's first ever World Athletics Championships medal with a bronze in the women's marathon.

== Medallists ==
Medal	Athlete	Event	Date
Bronze	Julia Paternain	Women's marathon	14 September

== Results ==
Uruguay entered 9 athletes to the championships: 4 women and 5 men.

Key

- Q = Qualified for the next round
- q = Qualified for the next round as a fastest loser or, in field events, by position without achieving the qualifying target
- NR = National record
- PB = Personal best
- SB = Season best
- N/A = Round not applicable for the event

=== Men ===
Track and road events

Athlete	Event	Heats		Final	
Athlete	Event	Result	Rank	Result	Rank
Santiago Catrofe	5000 metres	13:17.26	10	Did not advance	
Valentín Soca	5000 metres	13:41.80	5 Q	13:34.35	15
Nicolás Cuestas	Marathon	—N/a		2:28:37	62
Cristhian Zamora	Marathon	—N/a		2:16:09 SB	32

Field events

Athlete	Event	Qualification		Final	
Athlete	Event	Distance	Position	Distance	Position
Emiliano Lasa	Long jump	7.67	28	Did not advance	

=== Women ===
Track and road events

Athlete	Event	Heat		Semifinal		Final	
Athlete	Event	Result	Rank	Result	Rank	Result	Rank
Déborah Rodríguez	800 metres	2:03.18	8	Did not advance			
María Pía Fernández	1500 metres	4:28:10	14	Did not advance			
Julia Paternain	Marathon	—N/a				2:27:23	3rd place, bronze medalist(s)

Field events

Athlete	Event	Qualification		Final	
Athlete	Event	Distance	Position	Distance	Position
Manuela Rotundo	Javelin throw	57.43	24	Did not advance	
