= Athletics at the 2018 Commonwealth Games – Men's marathon =

Men's marathon at the 2018 Commonwealth Games
- Venue: Southport Broadwater Parklands
- Dates: 15 April 2018
- Competitors: 25 from 13 nations
- Winning time: 2:16:46

Medalists
gold medal	Michael Shelley	Australia
silver medal	Munyo Mutai	Uganda
bronze medal	Robbie Simpson	Scotland

The men's marathon at the 2018 Commonwealth Games, as part of the athletics programme, was held in Southport Broadwater Parklands, Gold Coast on 15 April 2018.

Scotland's Callum Hawkins was the race leader with seven kilometres to go, and led the field by two minutes. At 28 degrees Celsius, the race conditions were unusually hot and Hawkins suffered exhaustion and collapsed on the road. He briefly tried to continue but again collapsed, hitting his head on the road side barrier. As race rules dictate that medics need athlete permission to intervene (and thus end the athlete's participation), he was left on the roadside for several minutes in view of spectators as he did not request assistance. The games organisers received criticism for not responding sooner to the athlete's distress, though the organisers stated that they had reacted in accordance to competition regulations. Hawkins was kept overnight at Gold Coast University Hospital for review. Paul Bush, chair of Commonwealth Games Scotland, asked for a formal review of the situation and to see if changes could be made in future races to prevent such outcomes.

Eight of the 25 entrants failed to finish the race.

== Records ==
Prior to this competition, the existing world and Games records were as follows:

World record	Dennis Kimetto (KEN)	2:02:57	Berlin, Germany	28 September 2014
Games record	Ian Thompson (ENG)	2:09:12	Christchurch, New Zealand	31 January 1974

== Schedule ==
The schedule was as follows:

Date	Time	Round
Sunday 15 April 2018	8:15	Race

All times are Australian Eastern Standard Time (UTC+10)

== Results ==
The results were as follows:

Rank	Athlete	Time	Notes
1st place, gold medalist(s)	Michael Shelley (AUS)	2:16:46	
2nd place, silver medalist(s)	Solomon Mutai (UGA)	2:19:02	
3rd place, bronze medalist(s)	Robbie Simpson (SCO)	2:19:36	
4	Kevin Seaward (NIR)	2:19:54	
5	Liam Adams (AUS)	2:21:08	
6	Paulus Iiyambo (NAM)	2:22:39	
7	Alex Chesakit (UGA)	2:23:06	
8	Lee Merrien (GGY)	2:24:10	
9	Julius Karinga (KEN)	2:24:26	
10	Kenneth Mburu Mungara (KEN)	2:25:42	
11	Andrew Davies (WAL)	2:26:05	
12	Tyler Butterfield (BER)	2:26:29	NR
13	Ramolefi Motsieloa (LES)	2:30:16	
14	Stephano Gwandu (TAN)	2:33:03	
15	Josh Griffiths (WAL)	2:37:10	
16	Nicholas Manza Kamakya (KEN)	2:40:18	
17	Happy Ndacha McHenlenje (MAW)	2:45:31	
−	Callum Hawkins (SCO)	DNF	
−	Saidi Makula (TAN)	DNF	
−	Tsepo Mathibelle (LES)	DNF	
−	Alexis Nizeyimana (RWA)	DNF	
−	Robert Chemonges (UGA)	DNF	
−	Uveni Kugongelwa (NAM)	DNF	
−	Namupala Reonard (NAM)	DNF	
−	Paul Pollock (NIR)	DNS	
