= Athletics at the 2014 Commonwealth Games – Men's marathon =

International sporting event

Men's marathon at the Commonwealth Games

The Men's marathon at the 2014 Commonwealth Games, as part of the athletics programme, was held in Glasgow on 27 July 2014. The same course is used for both Men's marathon and Women's marathon.

== Results ==
Rank	Athlete	Time	Notes
1st place, gold medalist(s)	Michael Shelley (AUS)	2:11:15	PB
2nd place, silver medalist(s)	Stephen Kwelio Chemlany (KEN)	2:11:58	
3rd place, bronze medalist(s)	Abraham Kiplimo (UGA)	2:12:23	
4	Munyo Solomon Mutai (UGA)	2:12:26	
5	John Eriku Kelai (KEN)	2:12:41	
6	Eric Ndiema (KEN)	2:13:44	
7	Liam Adams (AUS)	2:13:49	PB
8	Phillip Kiplimo (UGA)	2:14:09	
9	Derek Hawkins (SCO)	2:14:15	
10	Steve Way (ENG)	2:15:16	PB
11	Fabiano Joseph Naasi (TAN)	2:15:21	
12	Tsepo Ramonene (LES)	2:16:21	PB
13	Nicholas Torry (ENG)	2:16:34	
14	Ben Moreau (ENG)	2:16:50	
15	Ramolefi Motsieloa (LES)	2:17:12	PB
16	Ross Houston (SCO)	2:18:12	
17	Andrew Davies (WAL)	2:18:59	
18	Dieudonné Disi (RWA)	2:19:14	
19	Martin Dent (AUS)	2:19:22	
20	Jean Vilbrim (MRI)	2:25:39	
21	Jean Pierre Mvuyekure (RWA)	2:26:40	
22	Francis Khanje (MAW)	2:31:19	
23	Mohammed Kassim (GHA)	2:33:37	
24	Tongia Vakaafi (TON)	2:58:57	
−	Namupala Reonard (NAM)	DNF	
−	John Leonard Karori (TAN)	DNF	
−	Yin Ren Mok (SIN)	DNS	
