= Namibia at the 2017 World Championships in Athletics =

- WA code: NAM

in London
- Competitors: 5 in 2 events
- Medals: Gold 0 Silver 0 Bronze 0 Total 0

World Championships in Athletics appearances
- 1991; 1993; 1995; 1997; 1999; 2001; 2003; 2005; 2007; 2009; 2011; 2013; 2015; 2017; 2019; 2022; 2023; 2025

Namibia competed at the 2017 World Championships in Athletics in London, United Kingdom, from 4 to 13 August 2017.

== Results ==
(q – qualified, NM – no mark, SB – season best)

=== Men ===
Track and road events

Athlete	Event	Final	
Athlete	Event	Result	Rank
Paulos Iiyambo	Marathon	2:19.45	37
Namupala Reonard	Marathon	2:18.51 SB	35

=== Women ===
Track and road events

Athlete	Event	Final	
Athlete	Event	Result	Rank
Lavinia Haitope	Marathon	2:44.02	50
Helalia Johannes	Marathon	2:32.01	19
Beata Naigambo	Marathon	2:34.24 SB	30
