= Derek Hawkins =

Derek Hawkins may refer to:

- Derek Hawkins (cricketer) (1935–2010), English cricketer
- Derek Hawkins (runner) (born 1989), British distance runner
