= Uruguay at the 2022 World Athletics Championships =

- WA code: URU
- National federation: CAU
- Website: atlecau.org.uy

in Eugene, United States 15–24 July 2022
- Competitors: 5 (4 men and 1 woman)

World Athletics Championships appearances (overview)
- 1983; 1987; 1991; 1993; 1995; 1997; 1999; 2001; 2003; 2005; 2007; 2009; 2011; 2013; 2015; 2017; 2019; 2022; 2023; 2025

Uruguay competed at the 2022 World Athletics Championships in Eugene, United States, from 15 to 24 July 2022. It entered 6 athletes.

== Results ==
=== Men ===
Track and road events

Athlete	Event	Heat		Semi-final		Final	
Athlete	Event	Result	Rank	Result	Rank	Result	Rank
Santiago Catrofe	1500 metres	3:35.86	7 q	3:40.16	20	Did not advance	
Nicolás Cuestas	Marathon	—				2:13:52	39
Ernesto Zamora	Marathon	—				2:17:54	50

Field events

Athlete	Event	Qualification		Final	
Athlete	Event	Distance	Position	Distance	Position
Emiliano Lasa	Long Jump	7.89	13	Did not qualify	

=== Women ===
Track and field events

Athlete	Event	Heat		Semi-final		Final	
Athlete	Event	Result	Rank	Result	Rank	Result	Rank
Déborah Rodríguez	800 metres	2:03.04	36	Did not advance			
