= Iiyambo =

Iiyambo is a surname. Notable people with the surname include:

- Paulus Iiyambo (born 1982), Namibian long-distance runner
- Tangeni Iiyambo, Namibian politician
