= Namibia at the 2013 World Championships in Athletics =

- WA code: NAM

in Moscow
- Competitors: 6
- Medals: Gold 0 Silver 0 Bronze 0 Total 0

World Championships in Athletics appearances
- 1991; 1993; 1995; 1997; 1999; 2001; 2003; 2005; 2007; 2009; 2011; 2013; 2015; 2017; 2019; 2022; 2023; 2025

Namibia competed at the 2013 World Championships in Athletics in Moscow, Russia, from 10–18 August 2013. A team of 6 athletes was announced to represent the country in the event.

== Results ==
(q – qualified, NM – no mark, SB – season best)

=== Men ===
Track and road events

Athlete	Event	Preliminaries		Heats		Semifinals		Final	
Athlete	Event	Time	Rank	Time	Rank	Time	Rank	Time	Rank
Hitjivirue Kaanjuka	200 metres								

=== Women ===
Track and road events

Athlete	Event	Preliminaries		Heats		Semifinals		Final	
Athlete	Event	Time	Rank	Time	Rank	Time	Rank	Time	Rank
Tjipekapora Herunga	400 metres								
Alina Armas	Marathon								
Leena Ekandjo	Marathon								
Helalia Johannes	Marathon								
Beata Naigambo	Marathon								
