= Colreavy =

Colreavy is a surname.

== List of people with the surname ==
- Bernard Colreavy (1871–1946), Australian cricketer
- Jack Colreavy (born 1989), Australian long-distance runner
- Michael Colreavy (born 1948), Irish politician
