= Athletics at the 2022 Commonwealth Games – Men's marathon =

Men's marathon at the 2022 Commonwealth Games
- Venue: Victoria Square
- Dates: 30 July 2022
- Competitors: 20 from 13 nations
- Winning time: 2:10:55

Medalists
gold medal	Victor Kiplangat	Uganda
silver medal	Alphonce Simbu	Tanzania
bronze medal	Michael Mugo Githae	Kenya

The men's marathon at the 2022 Commonwealth Games, as part of the athletics programme, was held in Victoria Square, Birmingham on 30 July 2022.

== Field ==
Athletics Weekly named the favourite as the Tanzanian Alphonce Simbu, who finished third at the 2017 World Athletics Championships and had a season best of 2:06:20. Kenya's Jonathan Korir held the fastest personal best in the field; 2:04:32 achieved in Amsterdam in 2021 but his best time for 2022 was 2:08:04 at the Tokyo Marathon on 6 March. Ugandan Victor Kiplangat ran 2:05:09 in Hamburg which gave him the fastest season best in the field. Dewi Griffiths, Stephen Scullion and Motlokoa Nkhaunutlane all had personal bests under 2:10 while the sole Englishman, Jonny Mellor had run 2:10:46 in the trials for the games in Manchester. Other runners in the field included Australians Andrew Buchanan and Liam Adams who had personal bests of 2:12:23 and 2:10:48, respectively, Lesotho runners Lebenya Nkoka and Tsepo Mathibelle and Northern Irish runner Kevin Seaward. Paul Pollock was due to race but pulled out due to injury before the start. Athletics Weekly predicted a top three finish of Simbu, Korir and Kiplangat in times of 2:09:45, 2:09:50 and 2:10:15, respectively. they also noted a lack of "quality of depth" in the field while suggesting that Kenya had struggled to find athletes to compete.

== Course ==
The marathon distance is 42.195 kilometres (26.219 mi) long as sanctioned by World Athletics. The course started in Smithfield, Birmingham, headed down Sherlock Street and on to Pershore Road (A441). Passing Edgbaston Stadium, the course took a detour through Cannon Hill Park before rejoining Pershore Road and continuing in a southerly direction. The course left Pershore Road and passed through Bournville and by Cadbury World, took a turn on to Heath Road then Kingsley Road, Woodlands Park Road, Hay Green Lane, and back on to Bournville Lane to head north back through Bournville. The course rejoined Pershore Road via Warwards Lane and headed in the opposite direction up to the roundabout where the road meets Sherlock Street. At the roundabout the runners would make a u-turn to repeat the above section for a second time. When reaching the roundabout again, the runners would proceed on to Sherlock Street, then take a left on to Hurst Street towards the city centre. The course then passed by the town hall and the central library before heading into the Jewellery Quarter via Newhall Hill and Frederick Street. The course then turned on to Warstone Lane, Caroline Street and George Street before turning left back towards the centre. The course finally ran along Edmund Street and Colmore Row before finishing next to St Philip's Cathedral.

== Records ==
Prior to this competition, the existing World and Games records were as follows:

World record	Eliud Kipchoge (KEN)	2:01:39	Berlin, Germany	16 September 2018
Commonwealth record	Eliud Kipchoge (KEN)	2:01:39	Berlin, Germany	16 September 2018
Games record	Ian Thompson (ENG)	2:09:12	Christchurch, New Zealand	31 January 1974

== Summary ==
The race started at 9:00 a.m. British Summer Time (UTC+1) on 30 July 2022, the second day of the games. The temperature was 18 °C (64 °F), humidity was at 85% and the conditions were overcast. Adams led the race through the first 25 kilometres (16 mi), passing through 10 kilometres (6.2 mi) in 31:07 and halfway in 1:04:34. 25 kilometres into the race, Michael Githae, Kiplangat, Simbu, Korir, and Hamisi Misai were all still with Adams. An hour and 25 minutes into the race, Kiplangat, Githae, and Simbu pulled away from the others before Adams and Misai were able to rejoin the group. Kiplangat and Simbu then opened up a lead on the others with Adams in third before Kiplangat then pulled away from Simbu to pass through 30 kilometres (19 mi) in 1:32:45. Kiplangat proceeded to lead through 40 kilometres (25 mi) in 2:02:57. He then took a wrong turn in the final stages of the race, but had such a lead on Simbu that he was still the "comfortable" winner, crossing the line in 2:10:55

== Results ==
The results were as follows:

Rank	Athlete	Time	Notes
1st place, gold medalist(s)	Victor Kiplangat (UGA)	2:10:55	
2nd place, silver medalist(s)	Alphonce Simbu (TAN)	2:12:29	
3rd place, bronze medalist(s)	Michael Mugo Githae (KEN)	2:13:16	
4	Liam Adams (AUS)	2:13:23	SB
5	Jonathon Kipleting Korir (KEN)	2:14:06	
6	Jonathan Mellor (ENG)	2:15:31	
7	Andrew Buchanan (AUS)	2:15:40	
8	Hamisi Misai (TAN)	2:15:59	PB
9	Kevin Seaward (NIR)	2:16:54	
10	Stephen Scullion (NIR)	2:17:51	
11	Dewi Griffiths (WAL)	2:17:58	SB
12	Nitendra Singh Rawat (IND)	2:19:22	
13	Tomas Hilifa Rainhold (NAM)	2:24:30	
14	Oliver Lockley (IOM)	2:25:52	SB
15	Lebenya Nkoka (LES)	2:32:52	SB
16	Arnold Rogers (GIB)	2:37:11	
17	Tsepo Mathibelle (LES)	2:38:52	SB
18	Martin Faeni (SOL)	2:40:23	PB
-	Motlokoa Nkhaunutlane (LES)	DNF	
-	Erick Kiplagat Sang (KEN)	DNS	
