= 2017 World Championships in Athletics – Men's marathon =

Men's Marathon at the 2017 World Championships
- Venue: Olympic Stadium
- Dates: 6 August
- Competitors: 98 from 50 nations
- Winning time: 2:08.27

Medalists
gold medal	Geoffrey Kirui	Kenya
silver medal	Tamirat Tola	Ethiopia
bronze medal	Alphonce Simbu	Tanzania

Video on YouTube Official Video

The men's marathon at the 2017 World Championships in Athletics was held on 6 August, starting and finishing on Tower Bridge.

== Summary ==
The race started off with a tight pack running at a leisurely pace. 10 kilometres into the race, the British crowds were pleased to see Callum Hawkins in the lead, but there were 59 others in the lead pack. By 15 kilometres there were still 31 and by half way only another three had started to fall off the back. Then the racing began as a small group went off the front including the entire Kenyan team, a Kenyan Turkish transplant, two Ethiopians, two Eritreans, Alphonce Simbu from Tanzania and Hawkins. Of that group, Geoffrey Kirui, Tamirat Tola and Gideon Kipketer were pushing the pace as a three man pack. Kipketer faltered and it was a two man race with Simbu breaking off the front of the second pack. About 10 kilometres from the finish, Tola tried to break away. But the one breaking was Tola as Kirui came back and then set off on his own. Over the last seven kilometres, Kirui opened up almost a minute and half of daylight, comfortably crossing the line for the gold. Tola struggled to successfully hold off Simbu to keep silver while an inspired Hawkins picked up the pieces and finished a strong fourth just 26 seconds back.

== Records ==
Before the competition records were as follows:

Record	Perf.	Athlete	Nat.	Date	Location
World	2:02:57	Dennis Kipruto Kimetto	KEN	28 Sep 2014	Berlin, Germany
Championship	2:06:54	Abel Kirui	KEN	22 Aug 2009	Berlin, Germany
World leading	2:03:58	Wilson Kipsang Kiprotich	KEN	26 Feb 2017	Tokyo, Japan
African	2:02:57	Dennis Kipruto Kimetto	KEN	28 Sep 2014	Berlin, Germany
Asian	2:06:16	Toshinari Takaoka	JPN	13 Oct 2002	Chicago, United States
NACAC	2:05:38	Khalid Khannouchi	USA	14 Apr 2002	London, Great Britain
South American	2:06:05	Ronaldo da Costa	BRA	20 Sep 1998	Berlin, Germany
European	2:06:36	Benoit Zwierzchiewski	FRA	6 Apr 2003	Paris, France
Oceanian	2:07:51	Robert de Castella	AUS	21 Apr 1986	Boston, United States

No records were set at the competition.

== Qualification standard ==
The standard to qualify automatically for entry was 2:19.00.

== Results ==
The final took place on 6 August at 10:54. The results were as follows:

Rank	Name	Nationality	Time	Notes
1st place, gold medalist(s)	Geoffrey Kirui	Kenya	2:08:27	SB
2nd place, silver medalist(s)	Tamirat Tola	Ethiopia	2:09:49	
3rd place, bronze medalist(s)	Alphonce Simbu	Tanzania	2:09:51	
4	Callum Hawkins	Great Britain & N.I.	2:10:17	PB
5	Daniele Meucci	Italy	2:10:56	PB
6	Gideon Kipketer	Kenya	2:10:56	
7	Yohanes Ghebregergis	Eritrea	2:12:07	
8	Daniel Wanjiru	Kenya	2:12:16	
9	Yuki Kawauchi	Japan	2:12:19	
10	Kentaro Nakamoto	Japan	2:12:41	
11	Solomon Mutai	Uganda	2:13:29	
12	Ezekiel Jafary	Tanzania	2:14:05	
13	Abdi Hakin Ulad	Denmark	2:14:22	SB
14	Kaan Kigen Özbilen	Turkey	2:14:29	SB
15	Shumi Dechasa	Bahrain	2:15:08	PB
16	Elkanah Kibet	United States	2:15:14	
17	Javier Guerra	Spain	2:15:22	
18	Ihor Olefirenko	Ukraine	2:15:34	SB
19	Tsegaye Mekonnen	Ethiopia	2:15:36	
20	Andrés Zamora	Uruguay	2:16:00	PB
21	Desmond Mokgobu	South Africa	2:16:14	
22	Mick Clohisey	Ireland	2:16:21	SB
23	Valentin Pfeil	Austria	2:16:28	
24	Remigijus Kančys	Lithuania	2:16:34	
25	Derlys Ayala	Paraguay	2:16:37	PB
26	Hiroto Inoue	Japan	2:16:54	
27	Ihor Russ	Ukraine	2:17:01	SB
28	Thonakal Gopi	India	2:17:13	
29	Mert Girmalegesse	Turkey	2:17:36	
30	Mohamed Reda El Aaraby	Morocco	2:17:50	
31	Andrew Davies	Great Britain & N.I.	2:17:59	
32	Mikael Ekvall	Sweden	2:18:12	SB
33	Pardon Ndhlovu	Zimbabwe	2:18:37	SB
34	Munkhbayar Narandulam	Mongolia	2:18:42	PB
35	Namupala Reonard	Namibia	2:18:51	SB
36	Yuriy Rusyuk	Ukraine	2:18:54	SB
37	Paulus Iiyambo	Namibia	2:19:45	
38	Stephno Gwandu Huche	Tanzania	2:20:05	
39	Josh Griffiths	Great Britain & N.I.	2:20:06	
40	Tiidrek Nurme	Estonia	2:20:41	SB
41	Ghebrezgiabhier Kibrom	Eritrea	2:21:22	
42	Bobby Curtis	United States	2:21:22	SB
43	Robert Chemonges	Uganda	2:21:24	
44	Happy Ndacha Mchelenje	Malawi	2:21:39	PB
45	Jack Colreavy	Australia	2:21:44	
46	Tseveenravdan Byambajav	Mongolia	2:21:48	
47	Millen Matende	Zimbabwe	2:21:52	SB
48	Bat-Ochiryn Ser-Od	Mongolia	2:21:55	
49	Leslie Encina	Chile	2:22:10	
50	Hassan Chani	Bahrain	2:22:19	
51	Ignas Brasevičius	Lithuania	2:22:20	SB
52	David Nilsson	Sweden	2:22:53	
53	Roman Fosti	Estonia	2:23:28	SB
54	Thomas Toth	Canada	2:23:47	
55	Manuel Cabrera	Chile	2:24:08	
56	Daviti Kharazishvili	Georgia	2:24:24	
57	Segundo Jami	Ecuador	2:24:28	
58	José Amado García	Guatemala	2:25:03	
59	Kim Hyo-su	South Korea	2:25:08	
60	Brad Milosevic	Australia	2:25:14	
61	David Carver	Mauritius	2:25:45	SB
62	Girmaw Amare	Israel	2:26:37	
63	Sean Hehir	Ireland	2:27:33	
64	Yu Seung-yeop	South Korea	2:29:06	
65	Shin Kwang-sik	South Korea	2:29:52	
66	Rok Puhar	Slovenia	2:33:12	
67	Juan Carlos Trujillo	Guatemala	2:33:42	SB
68	Luis Orta	Venezuela	2:33:42	PB
69	Luis Carlos Rivero	Guatemala	2:41:39	
70	Ricardo Ramos	Mexico	2:41:50	SB
71	Abraham Niyonkuru	Burundi	2:42:27	
	Jorge Castelblanco	Panama	DNF	
	Jean-Pierre Castro	Peru	DNF	
	Anuradha Cooray	Sri Lanka	DNF	
	Nicolás Cuestas	Uruguay	DNF	
	Abdelhadi El Hachimi	Belgium	DNF	
	Iván Fernández	Spain	DNF	
	Eric Gillis	Canada	DNF	
	Josh Harris	Australia	DNF	
	Marius Ionescu	Romania	DNF	
	Stefano La Rosa	Italy	DNF	
	Ayad Lamdassem	Spain	DNF	
	Raúl Machacuay	Peru	DNF	
	Augustus Maiyo	United States	DNF	
	Mariano Mastromarino	Argentina	DNF	
	Tsepo Mathibelle	Lesotho	DNF	
	Amanuel Mesel	Eritrea	DNF	
	Ercan Muslu	Turkey	DNF	
	Lebenya Nkoka	Lesotho	DNF	
	Cutbert Nyasango	Zimbabwe	DNF	
	Sibusiso Nzima	South Africa	DNF	
	Bhumiraj Rai	Nepal	DNF	
	Ricardo Ribas	Portugal	DNF	
	Aguelmis Rojas	Uruguay	DNF	
	Maru Teferi	Israel	DNF	
	Yemane Tsegay	Ethiopia	DNF	
	Enzo Yáñez	Chile	DNF	
	Valērijs Žolnerovičs	Latvia	DNF	
	Lusapho April	South Africa	DNS	
	Mumin Gala	Djibouti	DNS	
