= Steve Way (runner) =

British long-distance runner

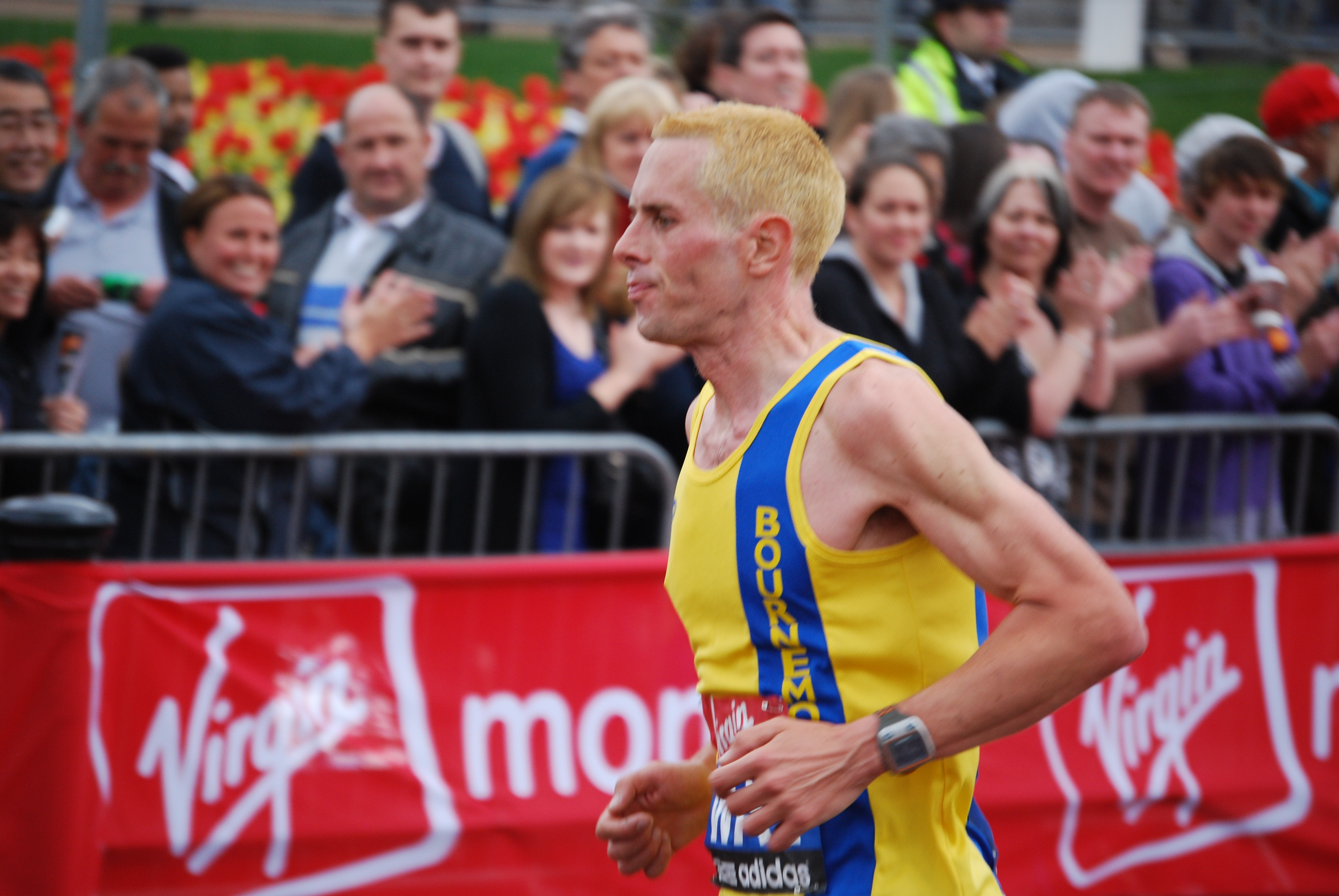
- Steve Way - 2010 London Marathon

Personal information
- Nationality: British
- Born: 6 July 1974 (age 52)
- Spouse: Sarah

Sport
- Country: Great Britain
- Sport: Running
- Rank: UK 1st (100k)
- Events: Marathon, Ultra distance
- Club: Bournemouth AC

Achievements and titles
- National finals: 2014 British Athletics 100K Championship: First
- Personal bests: 3000 m: 8:39.02 (2012); 5000 m: 14:41.92 (2012); Half marathon: 1:06:10 (2010); Marathon: 2:15:16 (2014); 50 km: 2:53:41 (2012); 100 km: 6:19:20 (2014)
- Updated on 2 December 2014

Steve Way (born 6 July 1974) is a British former long-distance runner. He was the holder of the British 100km record, after winning the 2014 British Championship in a time of 6:19:20 at the age of 39.

He only began running seriously in 2007 to overcome lifestyle-related health issues, when he weighed over 100kg. As of 2014, he has run the London Marathon in under 2:20 four times, breaking the Commonwealth Games qualifying time of 2:17 for the first time in 2014.

He represented England at the 2014 Commonwealth Games in Glasgow, coming in 10th overall, first for England, setting a new British veterans record with a personal best of 2:15:16. Following his 2014 performances, the media has lauded him as the 100kg, 20-a-day man turned elite athlete.

== Running career ==
Way entered his first marathon in 2006 and with only three weeks' training, finished in 3:07:08. He did not run again until 2007, when he started running in order to get fit, having weighed over 100 kg, smoked 20 cigarettes a day and subsisting on a diet of high-fat and high-sugar junk food.

In order to make time for his training, running 130 miles a week, Way gave up a lucrative career in IT with long hours at Barclays Bank for a 9-5 clerical role.

Following a 24-week training programme, Way ran the 2008 London Marathon with the goal of breaking 3 hours. He finished 100th in a time of 2:35:12. He began training with a running club and entered the 2009 London Marathon, this time finishing in 2:25:00. In 2010 he ran it in under 2:20 for the first time, repeating the achievement in 2011 and 2012. Injury prevented him from competing in 2013.

On 13 April 2014 Way came 15th in the 2014 London Marathon with a race time of 2:16:27, having started some way behind the elite field in the sub-2 hours 45 minutes group. He was the third-best British runner in the competition, behind Olympic athletes Mo Farah and Chris Thompson, achieving the qualifying standard for the Commonwealth Games with 33 seconds to spare. He had not intended to race, instead planning to use the event as preparation for the 100 km British Championship in May. After the initial busy stages, he caught up with the 2:15 official pacer and settled in behind him, running under 32 minutes for the first and second 10 kilometres, reaching the halfway point in 67:21.

In the 2014 Commonwealth Games marathon in Glasgow, Way finished 10th overall, first for England, just behind Derek Hawkins of Scotland. He ran a personal best time of 2:15:16 and also broke the previous British veterans record.

At the 2014 British Athletics National 100 km championship in May, Way completed the course in 6:19:20, coming in first place and setting a new British record. However, representing Great Britain at the 100 km World Championships in Qatar in November, Way was unable to repeat his form due to a stomach bug. Nevertheless, despite stopping repeatedly to use the toilets, he finished 13th out of a field of 200 runners, in 6:57:23 and helped Great Britain to Bronze in the men's team event.

In 2016, Way ran 63.75 km to win the Cambridge race that was part of the Wings For Life World Run.

In 2017, Way competed in the South African Comrades Marathon and, at his first attempt, finished 9th winning a gold medal for coming in the top 10 and being the first novice (first timer) over the line. Way became the first male British runner since Cavin Woodward, who was second on the race in 1976, to win a Comrades gold medal.

In 2018 Way won a string of races including: 50k Anglo Celtic Plate Home International @ British 100K Championships (2:58:03), Barry Track 40 (4:13:24), Dorchester Marathon (2:28:19), North Dorset Village Marathon (2:30:48), BHF Bournemouth Bay Half Marathon (70:32) & Bournemouth 10 (55:30). He then returned to the Comrades Marathon and, at his second attempt, finished 3rd in a time of 5:35:26 and won a second gold medal for coming in the top 10.
