= Uruguay at the 2017 World Championships in Athletics =

- Flag of Uruguay
- WA code: URU
- National federation: Uruguayan Athletics Confederation
- Website: confederacionatletica.org (in Spanish)

in London, United Kingdom 4–13 August 2017
- Competitors: 5 (4 men and 1 woman) in 3 events
- Medals: Gold 0 Silver 0 Bronze 0 Total 0

World Championships in Athletics appearances
- 1983; 1987; 1991; 1993; 1995; 1997; 1999; 2001; 2003; 2005; 2007; 2009; 2011; 2013; 2015; 2017; 2019; 2022; 2023; 2025

Uruguay competed at the 2017 World Championships in Athletics in London, United Kingdom, from 4 to 13 August 2017.

== Results ==
=== Men ===
Track and road events

Athlete	Event	Final	
Athlete	Event	Result	Rank
Nicolás Cuestas	Marathon	DNF	–
Aguelmis Rojas	Marathon	DNF	–
Andrés Zamora	Marathon	2:16:00 PB	20

Field events

Athlete	Event	Qualification		Final	
Athlete	Event	Distance	Position	Distance	Position
Emiliano Lasa	Long jump	7.96	9 q	8.11	9

=== Women ===
Track and road events

Athlete	Event	Heat		Semifinal		Final	
Athlete	Event	Result	Rank	Result	Rank	Result	Rank
Déborah Rodríguez	400 metres hurdles	57.61 SB	35	Did not advance			
