= Uruguay at the 2019 World Athletics Championships =

- WA code: URU

in Doha, Qatar
- Competitors: 4 (2 men and 2 women) in 4 events
- Medals: Gold 0 Silver 0 Bronze 0 Total 0

World Athletics Championships appearances (overview)
- 1983; 1987; 1991; 1993; 1995; 1997; 1999; 2001; 2003; 2005; 2007; 2009; 2011; 2013; 2015; 2017; 2019; 2022; 2023; 2025

Uruguay competed at the 2019 World Athletics Championships in Doha, Qatar, from 27 September to 6 October 2019.

== Results ==
(q – qualified, NM – no mark, SB – season best)

=== Men ===
Track and road events

Athlete	Event	Final	
Athlete	Event	Result	Rank
Nicolás Cuestas	Marathon	2:40:05	55

Field events

Athlete	Event	Qualification		Final	
Athlete	Event	Result	Rank	Result	Rank
Emiliano Lasa	Long jump	7.66	20	did not advance	

=== Women ===
Track and road events

Athlete	Event	Heat		Semifinal		Final	
Athlete	Event	Result	Rank	Result	Rank	Result	Rank
Déborah Rodríguez	800 m	2:03.80	34	did not advance			
María Pía Fernández	1500 m	4:09.45 NR	28	did not advance			
