= Liam Adams (runner) =

Australian runner (born 1986)

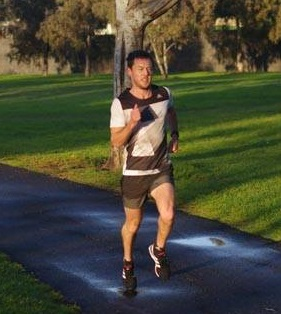
- Adams in 2017

Personal information
- Born: 4 September 1986 (age 40) Melbourne, Victoria, Australia
- Height: 1.78 m (5 ft 10 in)

Sport
- Country: Australia
- Sport: Cross Country and Track & Field

Achievements and titles
- Personal bests: Mile: 4:08.42 (2007); 3000 m: 7:53.79 (2011); 5000 m: 13:31.21 (2013); 10000 m: 28:11.76 (2012); Half Marathon: 1:02:15 (2022); Marathon: 2:08:39 (2023)

Liam Adams (born 4 September 1986) is an Australian runner. He competed in the Summer Olympics in 2016 in Rio de Janeiro and qualified for the Tokyo 2020 Olympics. Adams came 24th in the Men's marathon in a time of 2:15.51, 7 minutes behind the winner, Eliud Kipchoge of Kenya. At the 2023 Gold Coast Marathon Adams ran the fastest marathon time run by an Australian in Australia at 2:08:39, coming in third place overall, this was also a new PB. In Paris at the 2024 Summer Olympics Liam finished 49th 2:13:33 in the Marathon.

== Early years ==
Adams was a very sporty and competitive child. He was advised by his primary school teacher to try cross country.

In his second year, Adams won a medal in the nationals but it was only after a few years later that he decided to his training seriously. He began training with local coach Gregor Gojrzewski and this had a significant impact on his career.

As a 17 year old, in 2004, Adams won the national junior 5000m championship. Later that year he won the national junior cross country title. He finished his junior career with a personal best in the 5000m of 14:30.

== Achievements ==
Adams has taken part in several IAAF World Cross Country Championships with his best placing being in 2013 coming in 23rd place. In July 2012 he won the Gold Coast Half Marathon by finishing in front of Harry Summers and Shinichi Yamashita. In October 2018 he won the Melbourne Marathon.

2007: 102nd, IAAF World Cross Country Championships, Mombasa, Kenya
2008: 69th, IAAF World Cross Country Championships, Edinburgh, Great Britain
2009: 69th, IAAF World Cross Country Championships, Amman, Jordan
2010: 37th, IAAF World Cross Country Championships, Bydgoszcz, Poland
2011: 79th, IAAF World Cross Country Championships, Punta Umbría, Spain
2012: 1st, Gold Coast Half Marathon, Gold Coast, Queensland, Australia
2014: 7th, Commonwealth Games Marathon
2016: 5th, Orlen Warsaw Marathon
2016: 31st, Olympic Games Marathon Rio de Janeiro
2017: 9th, Berlin Marathon
2018: 5th, Commonwealth Games Marathon
2018: 1st, Melbourne Marathon
2018: 2nd, Kobe Marathon
2019: 1st, Sydney Morning Herald Half Marathon
2019: 6th, Gold Coast Marathon
2020: 13th, Lake Biwa Marathon
2021: 24th, Olympic Games Marathon Sapporo
2022: 4th, Commonwealth Games Marathon
2023: 3rd, Gold Coast Marathon
2024: 49th, Olympic Games Marathon Paris

=== Personal bests ===
Discipline	Result	Year	Location
Outdoor
One mile	4:08.42	2007	Melbourne, Australia
3,000 metres	7:53.79	2011	Newcastle, New South Wales, Australia
5,000 metres	13:31.21	2013	Walnut, California, United States
10,000 metres	28:11.76	2012	Palo Alto, California, United States
Half Marathon	1:02:15	2022	Launceston, Australia
Marathon	2:08:39	2023	Gold Coast, Australia
