= Namibia at the 2019 World Athletics Championships =

- WA code: NAM

in Doha, Qatar 27 September 2019 – 6 October 2019
- Competitors: 2 in 2 events
- Medals Ranked 31st: Gold 0 Silver 0 Bronze 1 Total 1

World Athletics Championships appearances
- 1991; 1993; 1995; 1997; 1999; 2001; 2003; 2005; 2007; 2009; 2011; 2013; 2015; 2017; 2019; 2022; 2023

Namibia competed at the 2019 World Athletics Championships in Doha, Qatar, from 27 September to 6 October 2019. The country's participation there marked its fifteenth appearance in the World Championships since its debut at the 1991 World Championships in Athletics. Namibia sent two athletes to the Championships, both of whom competed in the marathon events. Helalia Johannes became Namibia's first female medallist, and their first medallist in 26 years, when she won a bronze medal in the women's marathon. Tomas Hilifa Rainhold finished in 17th in the men's marathon.

== Background ==
Namibia first competed in the World Athletics Championships (then known as the World Championships in Athletics) in 1991, and have taken part in every Championships since. During that period two athletes won five medals for the country. Their most recent medal had come during the 1997 Championships. To qualify for the World Championships, athletes had to meet the standards set by the IAAF (now known as World Athletics). In most disciplines, these criteria were more difficult to achieve than they had been for the 2017 Championships. Two athletes represented Namibia at the 2019 Championships: Tomas Hilifa Rainhold in the men's marathon and Helalia Johannes in the women's marathon. Rainhold qualified for the Championships courtesy of completing the Hamburg Marathon in 2:14:14, 1 minute and 46 seconds within the required standard of 2:16:00. Johannes, who was the reigning Commonwealth champion after winning the 2018 marathon had set a new Namibia national record in March 2019, running 2:22:25 to win the Nagoya Women's Marathon, well within the required 2:37:00. The two athletes were accompanied by their coach Robert Kaxuxuena.

== Medallists ==
Medallists
Medal	Name	Event	Date
Bronze	Helalia Johannes	Women's marathon	27 September

== Results ==
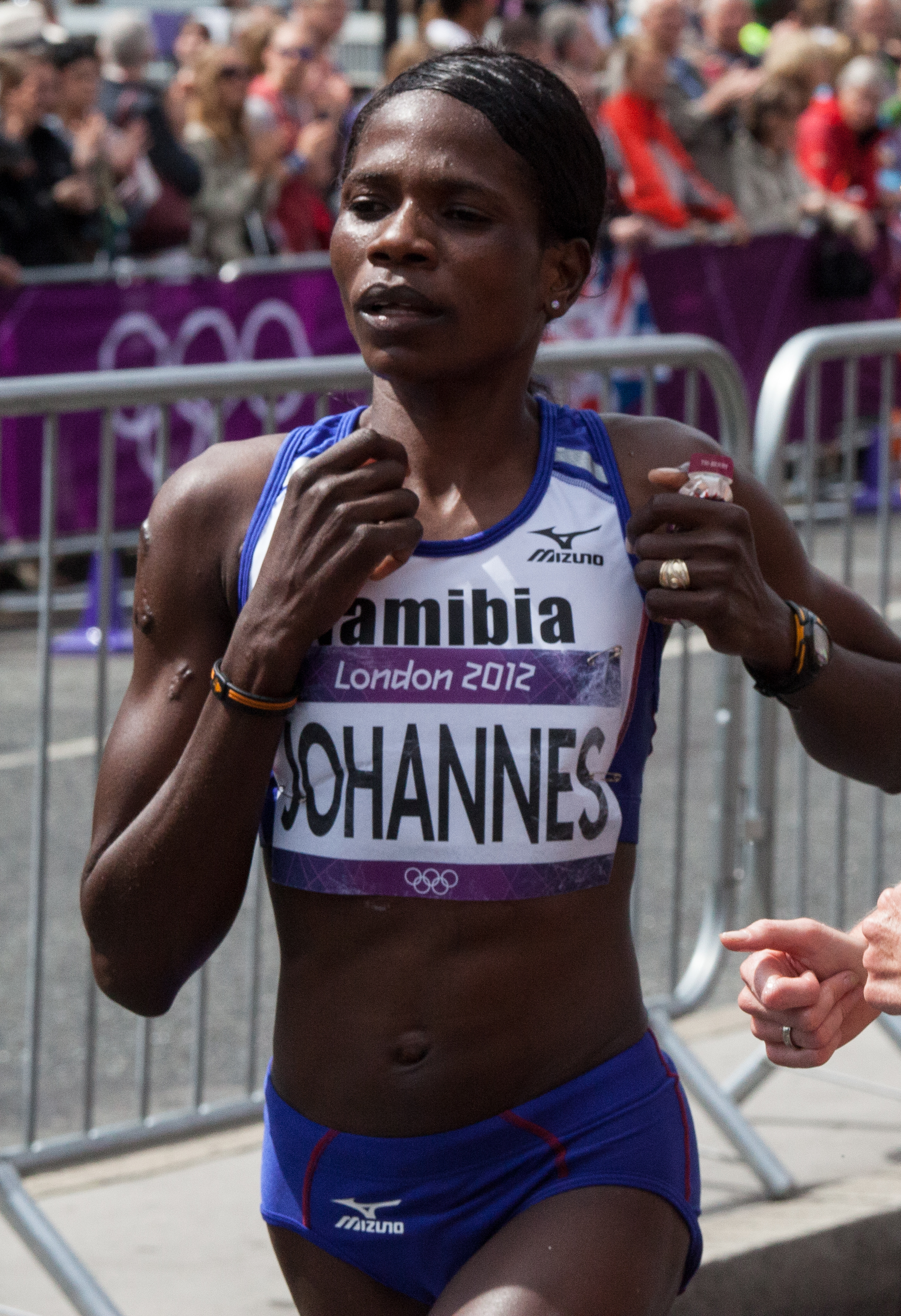
Helalia Johannes became Namibia's first female medalist at the World Athletics Championships

Johannes, taking part in her fourth World Championships, raced in the women's marathon on the opening night of the Championships. Due to the hot conditions expected in Doha, the race started just before midnight. In the IAAF's preview of the race, Johannes was considered "one to watch" by the sports writer Mike Rowbottom, particularly because her Commonwealth Games victory the previous year had been in temperatures of around 27 °C (81 °F). Despite the midnight start, temperatures in Doha were higher than expected, at 32.7 °C (90.9 °F) and 73 per cent humidity. Johannes was part of a leading pack that broke away around 5 kilometres (3.1 mi) into the race, and she stayed with the leaders until there was around 7 kilometres (4.3 mi) of the race remaining, at which stage Ruth Chepng'etich and Rose Chelimo moved away from her. Johannes held onto third place, and finished in 2:34:15, around 30 seconds behind Chelimo and over a minute ahead of Edna Kiplagat in fourth. She became the first female medallist for Namibia at the World Championships.

Rainhold was making his debut at the World Championships. Competing in the men's marathon, which was also held just before midnight, Rainhold ran what the Namibian Sun described as "a good race". He completed the race in 2:14:38, and finished in 17th place. Namibia's solitary bronze medal saw them finish joint 31st on the Championships medal table.

=== Men ===
Track and road events
Athlete	Event	Final	
Athlete	Event	Result	Rank
Tomas Hilifa Rainhold	Marathon	2:14:38	17

=== Women ===
Track and road events
Athlete	Event	Final	
Athlete	Event	Result	Rank
Helalia Johannes	Marathon	2:34:15	3rd place, bronze medalist(s)
