= Nelson Zamora =

Uruguayan athlete

Personal information
- Full name: Nelson Ernesto Zamora Villalba
- Nationality: Uruguayan
- Born: 5 April 1959 (age 67)
- Height: 1.72 m (5 ft 8 in)
- Weight: 62 kg (137 lb)

Sport
- Sport: Long-distance running
- Event: Marathon

Nelson Ernesto Zamora Villalba (born 5 April 1959) is a Uruguayan long-distance runner. He competed in the men's marathon at the 1992 Summer Olympics.

His sons Andrés Zamora and Cristhian Zamora are also long-distance runners.
