= Stephen Scullion =

Irish runner

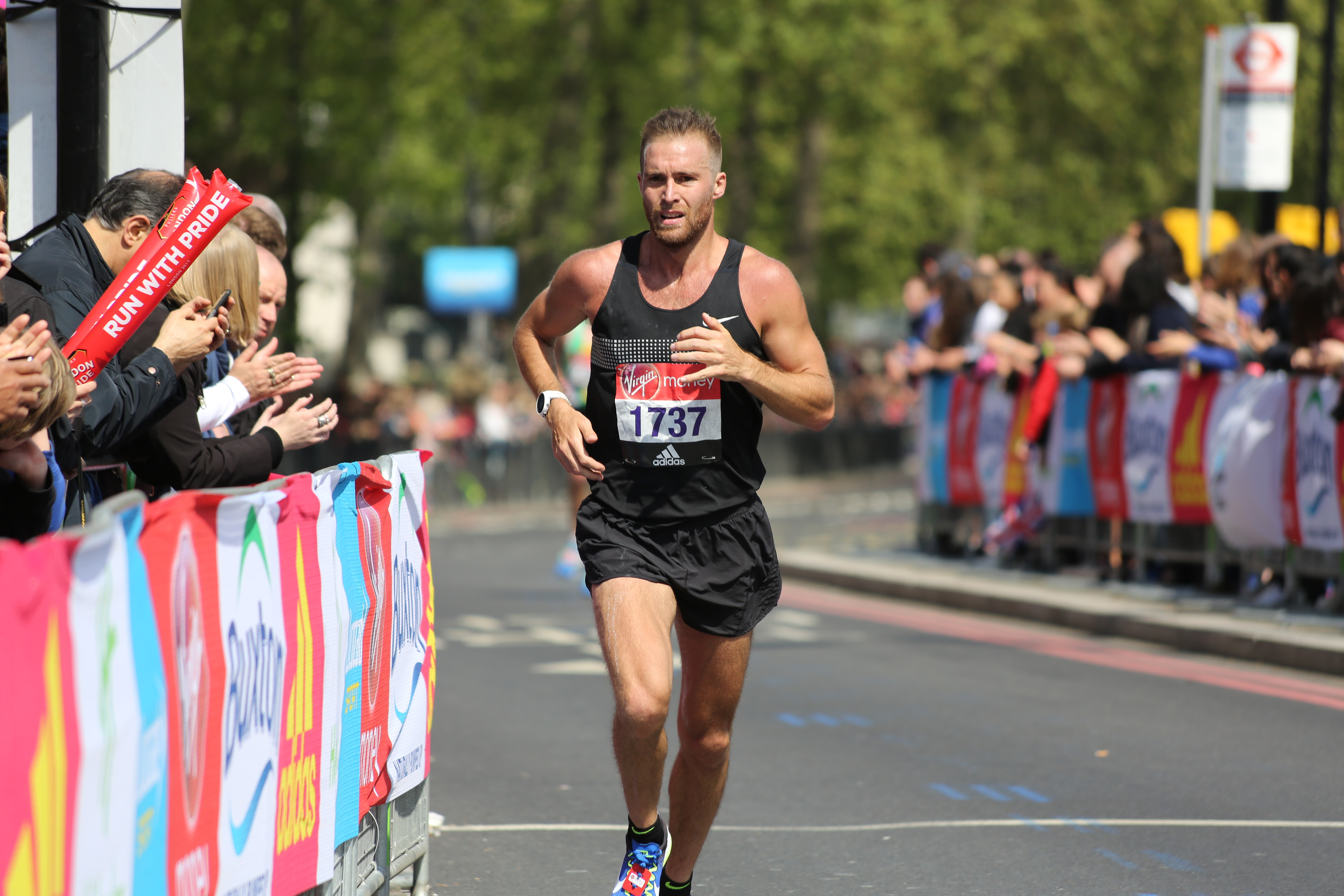
- Scullion in the 2017 London Marathon

Personal information
- Nationality: Irish / Northern Irish
- Born: 9 November 1988 (age 37) Belfast, Northern Ireland
- Home town: Belfast
- Height: 179 cm (5 ft 10 in)
- Weight: 68 kg (150 lb)

Sport
- Country: Ireland
- Sport: Athletics
- Event(s): marathon, half marathon, 10000 metres, 3000 metres
- Club: Dark Sky Distance
- Coached by: Stephen Haas

Achievements and titles
- Personal best: Marathon: 02:09:25 (London 2020)

Stephen Scullion (born 9 November 1988) is an Irish middle-distance and long-distance runner.

== Early life ==
Scullion was born in Belfast and attended Wellington College.

== Athletic career ==
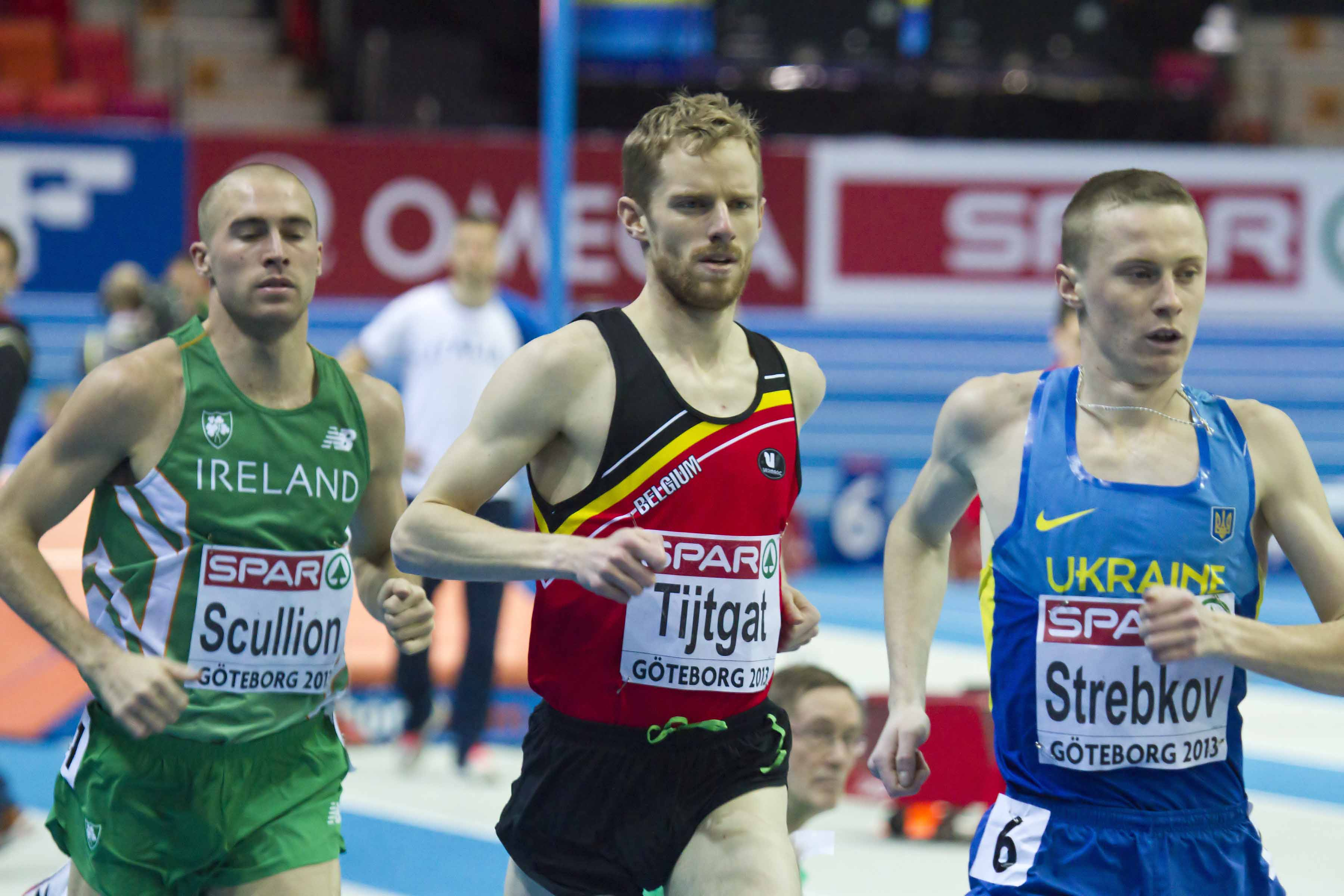
Scullion (left) at the 2013 European Athletics Indoor Championships in the 3000m event.

Scullion was selected for Northern Ireland at the 2010 Commonwealth Games in the 1500m and 5000m, but missed out due to illness. He competed in the 3000 metres at the 2013 European Athletics Indoor Championships and in the 10000 m at the 2018 European Athletics Championships.

At the 2019 Houston Marathon he finished tenth in a personal best, despite taking a wrong turn and being corrected by a member of the public. He qualified for the 2019 World Championships and for the 2020 Summer Olympics. Scullion finished second in the 2019 Dublin Marathon and eleventh in the 2020 London Marathon.

He competed in the men's marathon at the 2020 Summer Olympics held in Tokyo, Japan, but did not finish the race.

He represented Northern Ireland at the 2022 Commonwealth Games where he finished 10th in the men's marathon event.
