= Callum Hawkins =

British long-distance runner

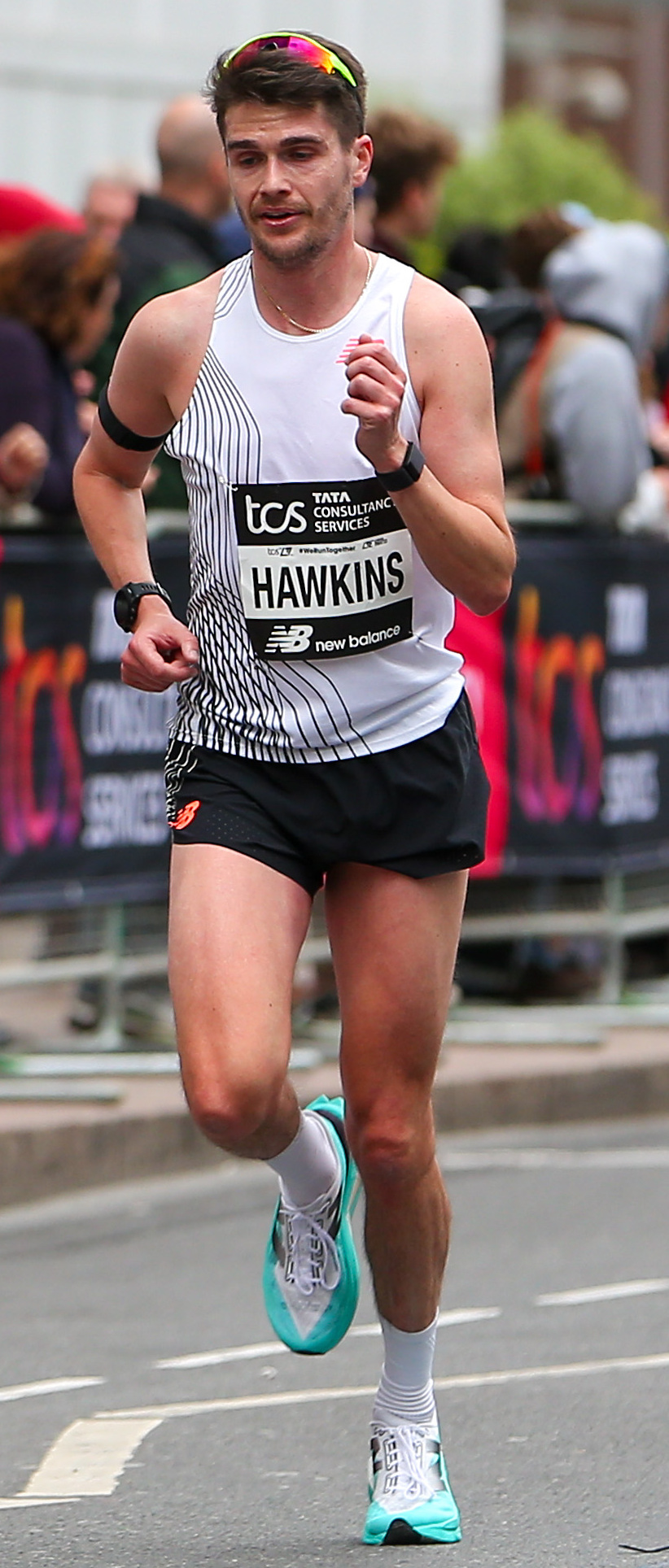
- Hawkins (2024 London Marathon)

Personal information
- Nationality: Scottish (British)
- Born: Callum Robert Hawkins; 22 June 1992 (age 34) Elderslie, Renfrewshire, Scotland
- Education: Butler University; University of the West of Scotland
- Height: 179 cm (5 ft 10 in)
- Weight: 62 kg (137 lb)

Sport
- Sport: Track and Field
- Events: 3000-10,000 m, half marathon, marathon
- Club: Kilbarchan Amateur Athletics Club; Butler University; University of the West of Scotland
- Coached by: Robert Hawkins (father)

Achievements and titles
- Personal bests: 3000 m – 8:07.98i (2010); 5000 m – 14:03.37i (2012); 10000 m – 28:02 (2019); HM – 1:00:00 (2017); Marathon – 2:08:14 (2019)
- Updated on 6 August 2021

Callum Robert Hawkins (born 22 June 1992) is a Scottish distance runner, who competed in the marathon at the 2016 Summer Olympics. He is the Scottish record holder in the marathon and the British all-time number six at that distance. Hawkins is also the all-time Great Britain number two (and European all-time number six) in the half marathon. He is the Great Scottish Run course record holder and was the first British man to win that event in 23 years.

== Personal life ==
Hawkins was born on 22 June 1992 in Elderslie near Paisley. He has two elder brothers, Scott and Derek, the latter of whom is also an international distance runner. The brothers were encouraged to take up athletics and are trained by their father Robert, a former international runner. Between 2010 and 2012 Hawkins competed for the Butler University in the United States, earning all-American status, and winning the 2011 Men's Athlete of the Year award for the Great Lakes Region. He was the first athlete from the Butler University to win the award. After that he studied mechanical engineering at the University of the West of Scotland. Some time before 2013 he had two surgeries on his left knee.

== Athletics ==
At the 2010 IAAF World Cross Country Championships held in Bydgoszcz, Poland, Hawkins finished 47th in the junior men's race in a time of 24 minutes and 21 seconds.

In 2013 he finished seventh in the men's under-23 race at the European Cross Country Championships. At the 2014 European Cross Country Championships he improved to a fifth-place finish in the under-23's race.

Hawkins competed at the 2014 Commonwealth Games held in Glasgow, Scotland, representing the host nation in the men's 10,000 metres, finishing 20th.

In October 2015 he finished the Great Scottish Run in a time of one hour two minutes and 42 seconds, setting a personal best to in second place overall behind Uganda's Moses Kipsiro and winning the gold medal for Scottish athletes. Later that month he competed in his first marathon in Frankfurt, finishing twelfth in two hours 12 minutes and 17 seconds, in a race won by Ethiopia's Sisay Lemma.

At the 2016 London Marathon, his second event over the distance, Hawkins finished eighth overall, and was the first British-qualified athlete to finish, in a time of two hours 10 minutes and 52 seconds. This time was inside the qualifying time of two hours 14 minutes needed to earn him a place in the Great Britain team for the 2016 Summer Olympics to be held in Rio de Janeiro, Brazil. He was joined in the men's marathon by fellow British athletes, Tsegai Tewelde and his brother Derek Hawkins.

Hawkins finished ninth in the marathon at the 2016 Olympics in a time of 2:11:52.

In October 2016 he again ran the Great Scottish Run and this time was the overall winner of the event in 1:00:24. This would have been a new Scottish half-marathon record, but the race was found to be 150 m short, which invalidated the result.

In January 2017 he became the first British athlete to beat Mo Farah in any race for 7 years at the Great Edinburgh International Cross Country race, which has been held annually since 2005. In fact Callum was 2nd in this race overall (with Farah in 7th) - Callum had put in a strong performance to lead for most of the race, but was out-sprinted by Leonard Korir in the final straight.

In February 2017 Hawkins won the Kagawa Marugame Half Marathon in Japan, in 60:00, setting a new Scottish half-marathon record. The previous record was set by Allister Hutton in 1987.

In August 2017 Hawkins finished 4th in the men's marathon at the 2017 World Championships, equalling the best ever performance by a British runner in this event.

Hawkins competed at the 2018 Commonwealth Games held in Gold Coast, Australia, and collapsed near the finish while leading, from heat exhaustion in 30 degree heat.

Hawkins came fourth in the men's marathon at the 2019 World Athletics Championships, the same placing as in 2017. He competed in the men's marathon at the 2020 Summer Olympics in Tokyo, Japan.

== International competitions ==
Year	Competition	Venue	Position	Event	Notes
2009	European Youth Olympic Festival	Tampere, Finland	1st	3000 m	8:23.62
2009	European Cross Country Championships	Dublin, Ireland	19th	Junior race	19:17
2009	European Cross Country Championships	Dublin, Ireland	1st	Junior team	24 pts
2010	World Cross Country Championships	Bydgoszcz, Poland	47th	Junior race	24:21
2010	World Cross Country Championships	Bydgoszcz, Poland	9th	Junior team	198 pts
2013	European Cross Country Championships	Belgrade, Serbia	7th	Under-23 race	24:18
2013	European Cross Country Championships	Belgrade, Serbia	1st	Under-23 team	40 pts
2014	European 10,000m Cup	Skopje, Macedonia	—	10,000 m	DNF
2014	Commonwealth Games	Glasgow, United Kingdom	20th	10,000 m	29:12.52
2014	European Cross Country Championships	Samokov, Bulgaria	5th	Under-23 race	25:49
2014	European Cross Country Championships	Samokov, Bulgaria	2nd	Under-23 team	31 pts
2016	World Half Marathon Championships	Cardiff, United Kingdom	15th	Individual	1:02:51
2016	World Half Marathon Championships	Cardiff, United Kingdom	4th	Team	3:07:00
2016	European Championships	Amsterdam, Netherlands	9th	Half marathon (individual)	1:03:57
2016	European Championships	Amsterdam, Netherlands	9th	Half marathon (team)	3:18:26
2016	Olympic Games	Rio de Janeiro, Brazil	9th	Marathon	2:11:52
2016	European Cross Country Championships	Chia, Italy	3rd	Senior race	27:49
2016	European Cross Country Championships	Chia, Italy	1st	Senior team	28 pts
2017	World Championships	London, United Kingdom	4th	Marathon	2:10:17
2018	Commonwealth Games	Gold Coast, Australia	—	Marathon	DNF
2019	World Championships	Doha, Qatar	4th	Marathon	2:10:57
2021	Olympic Games	Sapporo, Japan	–	Marathon	DNF
