= Athletics at the 2010 South American Games – Women's 400 metre hurdles =

The Women's 400m Hurdles event at the 2010 South American Games was held on March 22 at 17:15.

== Medalists ==
Gold	Silver	Bronze
Magdalena Mendoza; Venezuela	Déborah Rodríguez; Uruguay	Elaine Paixão; Brazil

== Records ==
Standing records prior to the 2010 South American Games
World record	Yuliya Pechenkina	Russia	52.34	Tula, Russia	8 August 2003
World Leading	Lauren Boden	Australia	55.75	Sydney, Australia	27 February 2010
South American record	Lucimar Teodoro	Brazil	55.84	Belém, Brazil	25 April 2009
South American U23 record	Perla Regina dos Santos	Brazil	56.08	São Caetano, Brazil	25 April 2003

== Results ==
Results were published.

Rank	Athlete	Nationality	Result	Notes
1st place, gold medalist(s)	Magdalena Mendoza	Venezuela	59.22	
2nd place, silver medalist(s)	Déborah Rodríguez	Uruguay	59.76	
3rd place, bronze medalist(s)	Elaine Paixão	Brazil	1:00.89	
4	Wanessa Zavolski	Brazil	1:01.16	
5	Rocío Rodrich	(Peru) Perú	1:02.96	
6	Marcela Cuesta	Colombia	1:03.74	
7	Natalia Pinzón	Colombia	1:07.51	

== See also ==
- 2010 South American Under-23 Championships in Athletics
