= Millen Matende =

Zimbabwean long-distance runner

Personal information
- Nationality: Zimbabwean
- Born: 23 September 1982 (age 43)

Sport
- Sport: Long-distance running
- Event: Marathon

Millen Matende (born 23 September 1982) is a Zimbabwean long-distance runner. He competed in the men's marathon at the 2017 World Championships in Athletics.
