= Kim Hyo-su =

South Korean long-distance runner

Sport
- Country: South Korea
- Sport: Long-distance running

Kim Hyo-su is a South Korean long-distance runner. In 2017, he competed in the men's marathon at the 2017 World Championships in Athletics held in London, United Kingdom. He finished in 59th place.

Kim's original goal was to be in the top 30 at the London World Championships, but he underperformed. He represents the Yeongdong County Office.
