= Manuel Jesus Cabrera Leal =

Chilean long-distance runner

Manuel Cabrera
Personal information
- Nationality: Chilean
- Born: 30 January 1983 (age 43)

Sport
- Sport: Long-distance running
- Event: Marathon

Manuel Cabrera (born 30 January 1983) is a Chilean long-distance runner. He competed in the men's marathon at the 2017 World Championships in Athletics.
