= Uruguay at the 2015 World Championships in Athletics =

- WA code: URU

in Beijing
- Competitors: 2
- Medals: Gold 0 Silver 0 Bronze 0 Total 0

World Championships in Athletics appearances
- 1983; 1987; 1991; 1993; 1995; 1997; 1999; 2001; 2003; 2005; 2007; 2009; 2011; 2013; 2015; 2017; 2019; 2022; 2023; 2025

Uruguay competed at the 2015 World Championships in Athletics in Beijing, China, from 22–30 August 2015.

== Results ==
(q – qualified, NM – no mark, SB – season best)

=== Men ===
Track and road events

Athlete	Event	Heat		Semifinal		Final	
Athlete	Event	Result	Rank	Result	Rank	Result	Rank
Andrés Silva	400 metres hurdles	DNS		did not advance			

Field events

Athlete	Event	Qualification		Final	
Athlete	Event	Distance	Position	Distance	Position
Emiliano Lasa	Long jump	7.95	15	did not advance	

=== Women ===
Track and road events

Athlete	Event	Heat		Semifinal		Final	
Athlete	Event	Result	Rank	Result	Rank	Result	Rank
Déborah Rodríguez	800 metres	2:02.46	34	did not advance			
Déborah Rodríguez	400 metres hurdles	56.30 NR	22 q	56.47	21	did not advance	
