= Rok Puhar =

Slovenian athlete

Personal information
- Nationality: Slovenian
- Born: 14 September 1992 (age 33)

Sport
- Sport: Long-distance running
- Event: Marathon

Rok Puhar (born 14 September 1992) is a Slovenian long distance runner. He competed in the men's marathon at the 2017 World Championships in Athletics. In 2018, he competed in the men's half marathon at the 2018 IAAF World Half Marathon Championships held in Valencia, Spain. He did not finish his race.
