= Michael Shelley (runner) =

Australian long-distance runner

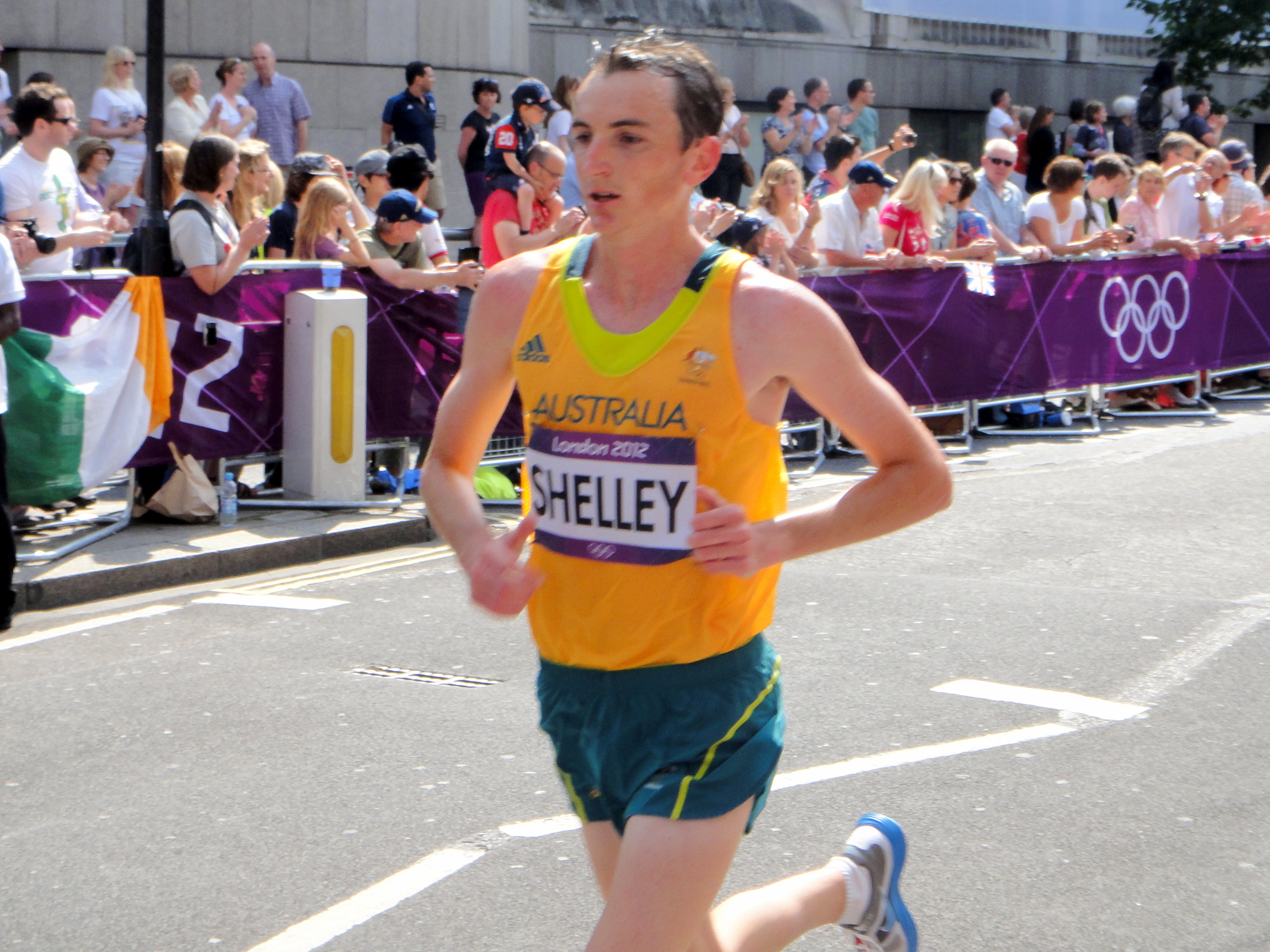
- Shelley in 2012

Personal information
- Born: 10 October 1983 (age 43) Gold Coast, Queensland, Australia
- Height: 1.83 m (6 ft 0 in)
- Weight: 60 kg (132 lb)

Sport
- Country: Australia
- Sport: Athletics
- Event: Marathon
Medal record
Commonwealth Games
Gold medal – first place	2014 Glasgow	Marathon
Gold medal – first place	2018 Gold Coast	Marathon
Silver medal – second place	2010 Delhi	Marathon

Michael Shelley (born 10 October 1983) is an Australian long-distance runner who competes in track events and road races. He has won gold medals in the marathon event at the 2014 Commonwealth Games at Glasgow, Scotland, as well as the 2018 Commonwealth Games at Gold Coast, Australia. He has also represented Australia at the IAAF World Cross Country Championships and the IAAF World Half Marathon Championships. On the road, he has won at the Gold Coast Half Marathon and the City2Surf race in Sydney.

== Career ==
Born in Gold Coast, Queensland, Shelley made his first international appearance at the 2002 World Junior Championships in Athletics. He had set a career best of 9:08.28 for the 3000 metres steeplechase earlier that year but did not manage to progress beyond the heats at the competition. He soon changed his focus to the 1500 metres instead and set a personal best of 3:39.90 before going on to take third at the 2003 Australian Athletics Championships. He also ran in the short race at the 2004 IAAF World Cross Country Championships.

He emerged in the senior ranks in 2007, finishing in 65th place at the 2007 IAAF World Cross Country Championships and running a 3000 metres best time of 7:59.59. He began moving into longer distance events in 2008 and, after placing 50th over 12 kilometres (7.5 mi) at the 2008 IAAF World Cross Country Championships, he won the half marathon event at the Gold Coast Marathon in July, recording a time of 1:02:41. He earned selection for the 2008 IAAF World Half Marathon Championships and he was the region's best performer with a sixteenth-place finish. At the end of the year he competed in the 10,000 metres at the Zatopek Classic in Melbourne and finished in third place with a time of 28:08.96.

2009 Season

He broke new ground with personal bests of 13:38.30 for the 5000 metres and 27:59.77 for the 10,000 metres at the start of 2009. His third appearance at the World Cross Country Championships resulted in his best performance to date, coming in 36th place in the senior race. He returned to the Gold Coast half marathon to defend his title but he was pipped at the line by Tanzanian Dickson Marwa, leaving Shelley with a personal best of 1:02:10 and the runner-up spot just one second behind. In September he won the City2Surf in Sydney with a time of 41:02. However, the 2009 season also brought along some setbacks for Shelley's career. He suffered a stress fracture in his leg and he also lost his funding from the Australian Institute of Sport.

2010 Season

Making his debut in the event, Shelley entered the 2010 Rotterdam Marathon in April and finished in twelfth place with a time of 2:13:05. He represented Australia at the 2010 Commonwealth Games and was chosen for the marathon. Running in only his second outing over the distance, the relatively slow pace worked in his favour as he overhauled Amos Tirop Matui in the final stages to take the silver medal behind John Kelai.

2011 Season

He was invited to run at the 2011 London Marathon and he reached the top ten, setting a personal best of 2:11:38 hours. His second marathon race of the year came at the Amsterdam Marathon in October. Although he finished eleventh overall, he set a personal best time of 2:11:23 hours.

2012 Season

Running in bib number 1059, Shelley placed 16th overall in a time of 2:14:10 at the 2012 London Olympics. The race was won by Ugandan born runner, Stephen Kiprotich in a time of 2:08:01.

2013 Season

On 13 October 2013, Shelley placed 12th in the Chicago Marathon with a time of 2:13:09 which was just outside his personal best of 2:11:23. The race was won by Kenyan Dennis Kimetto in a time of 2:03:45. In the process, Shelley became the 4th Australian marathon runner to clock an A qualifying time for the 2014 Glasgow Commonwealth Games.

2014 Season

On 27 July 2014, Shelley won the Gold Medal in the Glasgow Commonwealth Games in a personal best time of 2:11:15.

2016 Season

On 15 May 2016, he won Sydney Morning Herald Half Marathon race in Sydney with a time of 01:03:59

2017 Season

In October, Shelley placed 10th in the Chicago Marathon, finishing with a time of 2:12.52.

2018 Season

On 15 April 2018, Shelley won the gold medal in the Marathon event at the Gold Coast Commonwealth Games with a time of 2:16:46.
