= Lebenya Nkoka =

Mosotho marathon runner

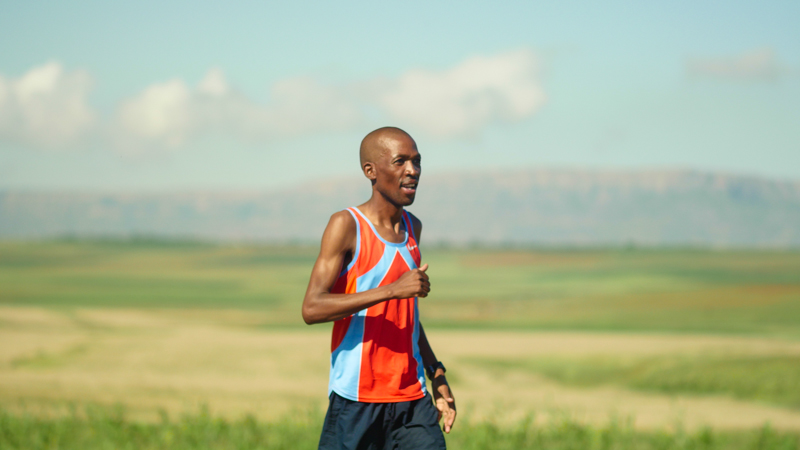
- Lebenya Nkoka training in Lesotho

Personal information
- Nationality: Lesotho
- Born: 19 October 1982 (age 43)

Sport
- Country: Lesotho
- Sport: Athletics
- Event: Marathon

Achievements and titles
- Personal best: 2:15:31 (2008)

Lebenya Nkoka (born October 19, 1982) is a Mosotho long-distance runner. He competed in the men's marathon at the 2016 Summer Olympics.

== International competitions ==
Year	Competition	Venue	Position	Event	Notes
2016	Olympic Games	Rio de Janeiro, Brazil	95th	Marathon	2:25:13
2022	Commonwealth Games	Birmingham, England	15th	Marathon	2:32:52

== Personal Bests ==
Event	Time	Venue	Date
marathon	2:15:31	Cape Town, South Africa	21 September 2008
