= Derek Hawkins (cricketer) =

English cricketer

Personal information
- Full name: Derek Graham Hawkins
- Born: 18 May 1935; Alveston, Gloucestershire, England
- Died: 27 November 2010 (aged 75); Alveston, Gloucestershire, England
- Batting: Right-handed
- Bowling: Right-arm off-spin

Domestic team information
- Years: Team
- 1952–1962: Gloucestershire

Career statistics
Competition	First-class
Matches	134
Runs scored	3755
Batting average	18.22
100s/50s	3/17
Top score	106
Balls bowled	2501
Wickets	38
Bowling average	30.34
5 wickets in innings	1
10 wickets in match	0
Best bowling	6/81
Catches/stumpings	78/–
- Source: Cricinfo, 13 January 2023

Derek Graham Hawkins (18 May 1935 – 27 November 2010) was an English first-class cricketer. He was a right-handed batsman and a right-arm off-break bowler who played for Gloucestershire from 1952 to 1962.

Hawkins was born at Alveston, Gloucestershire, and educated at the nearby Thornbury Grammar School. He captained the England Schools team in 1950, and signed a contract with Gloucestershire aged 16. After a two-year break for National Service he became a regular member of the Gloucestershire team, without ever fulfilling his potential. The highest of his three centuries was 106, his maiden century, against Sussex in 1957, when he reached 100 in two and a half hours. His most productive season was 1961, when he reached 1000 runs in a season for the first time and took his best bowling figures of 6 for 81 against Kent. However, he retired at the end of that season, aged 26, to work in the family car dealership, Berkeley Vale Motors.

Hawkins died at Alveston on 27 November 2010.
