= Jack Colreavy =

Australian long-distance runner

Personal information
- Nationality: Australian
- Born: 15 June 1989 (age 36)

Sport
- Sport: Long-distance running
- Event: Marathon

Jack Colreavy (born 15 June 1989) is an Australian long-distance runner. He competed in the men's marathon at the 2017 World Championships in Athletics.
