= 2014 Commonwealth Games Marathon Course =

The 2014 Commonwealth Games Marathon Course is the route around Glasgow city that will be used for both the women's and men's marathons in the 2014 Commonwealth Games.

== The route ==
The route was revealed by the games' organising committee on Friday 7 February 2014. The races will each make two laps of the course, which starts and finishes at Glasgow Green in the very centre of the city, and will run for 26 miles and 385 yards (42.195 km). The route will pass many of Glasgow's best known landmarks, and provide free spectator access to watch the races.

== See also ==
- 2012 Olympic Marathon Course
