= Uruguay at the 2009 World Championships in Athletics =

- WA code: URU

in Berlin
- Competitors: 2 (1 man, 1 woman)
- Medals: Gold 0 Silver 0 Bronze 0 Total 0

World Championships in Athletics appearances
- 1983; 1987; 1991; 1993; 1995; 1997; 1999; 2001; 2003; 2005; 2007; 2009; 2011; 2013; 2015; 2017; 2019; 2022; 2023

Uruguay competes at the 2009 World Championships in Athletics from 15–23 August in Berlin.

== Team selection ==
| Event | Athletes | |
| Event | Men | Women |
|---|---|---|
| 400 metres | Andrés Silva | |
| 400 metres hurdles | Andrés Silva | Déborah Rodríguez |

== Results ==
=== Men ===
| Event | Athletes | Heats | | Semifinal | | Final | |
| Event | Athletes | Result | Rank | Result | Rank | Result | Rank |
|---|---|---|---|---|---|---|---|
| 400 m | Andrés Silva | 46.86 | 40 | did not advance | | | |
| 400 m hurdles | Andrés Silva | 49.51 NR | 14 | 49.34 NR | 13 | did not advance | |

=== Women ===
| Event | Athletes | Heats | | Semifinal | | Final | |
| Event | Athletes | Result | Rank | Result | Rank | Result | Rank |
|---|---|---|---|---|---|---|---|
| 400 m hurdles | Déborah Rodríguez | 59.21 NR | 35 | did not advance | | | |
