= Kevin Seaward =

Northern Irish long-distance runner

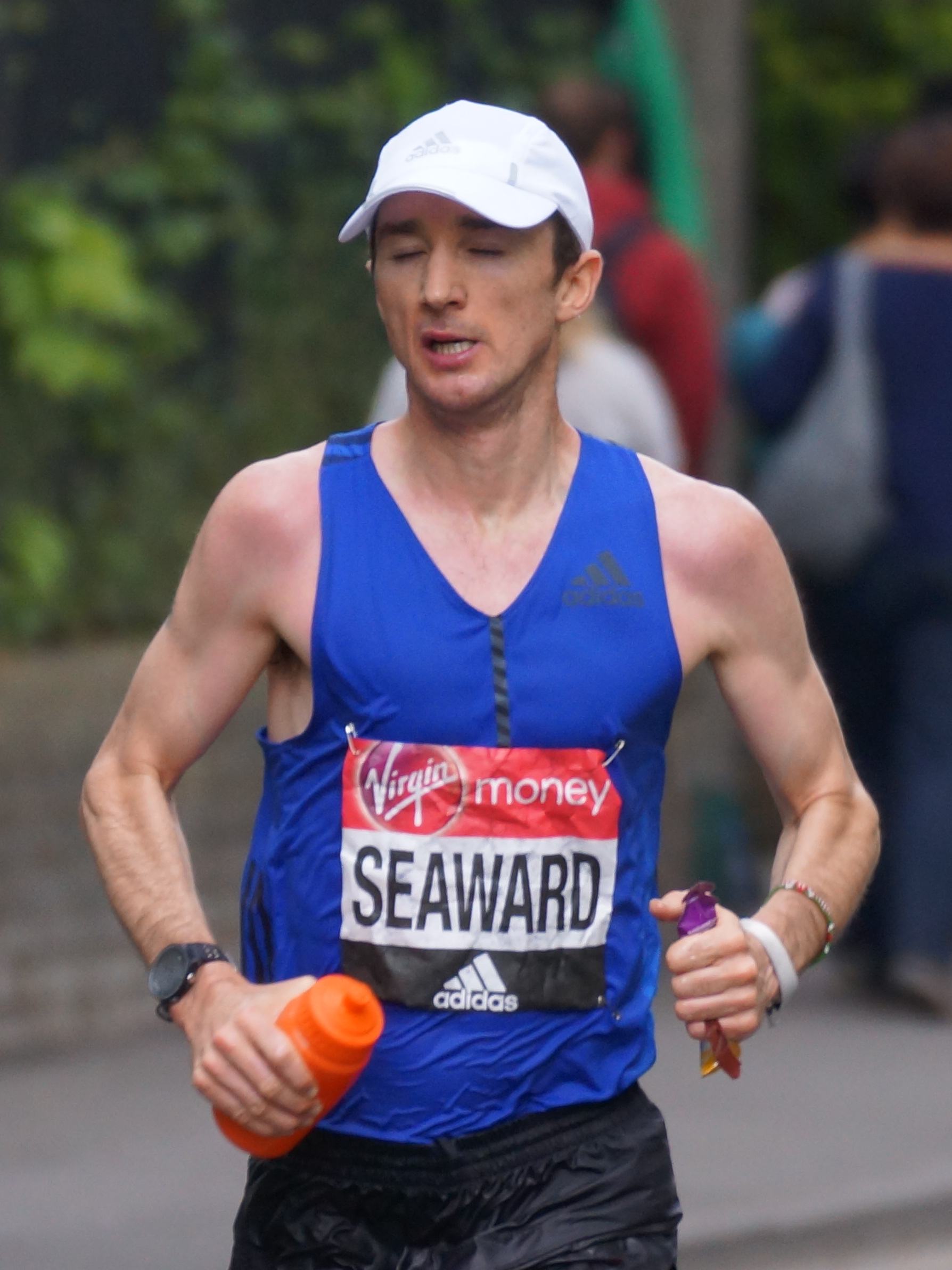
- Seaward at the 2017 London Marathon

Personal information
- Born: 3 October 1983 (age 42) Belfast, Northern Ireland

Sport
- Country: Northern Ireland; Ireland
- Sport: Athletics
- Event: Marathon

Kevin Seaward (born 3 October 1983) is a Northern Irish marathon runner from Belfast and an assistant headteacher at a school in Leicestershire. Seaward was part of the Ireland team at the 2016 Summer Olympics and achieved 64th place with a time of 2:20:06, and holds a personal best in the event with a 2:10:09 that he ran at the 2020 Seville Marathon.

== Athletics career ==
Seaward originally started running for St Malachy's Athletics Club. When he moved to England, he started to run for Cardiff Amateur Athletic Club in Wales. He represented Ireland at the 2016 Summer Olympics in the marathon but finished 64th. In 2018, Seaward represented Northern Ireland at the 2018 Commonwealth Games in Gold Coast, Queensland, Australia. He finished fourth in the marathon with a time of 2:19:54.

In 2019, Seaward ran the fastest time for an athlete representing Ireland since 2002 with a 2:13:39 in the Berlin Marathon. This time was outside the Olympic qualifying time, which led to suggestions Seaward might have to rely upon his IAAF ranking in order to qualify. However, in 2020, he ran a 2:10:10 at the Seville Marathon. This broke the record for Northern Irish marathon runners and gave Seaward an Olympic qualifying time. He attributed his time to the Nike Vaporfly trainers he had been wearing for the marathon compared with the Adidas Boosts he had on his feet for the Berlin marathon, despite admitting he hated the feel of them the first time he wore them.

As his time made him the second fastest marathon runner representing Ireland in history, it was speculated that he would be selected to represent Ireland at the 2020 Summer Olympics in one of their three marathon places. However the COVID-19 pandemic led to the postponement of the Olympics.

He competed at the 2022 Commonwealth Games where he finished 9th in the men's marathon event.

== Personal life ==
Seaward, a Roman Catholic, attended St Malachy's College in Belfast. Away from athletics, Seaward is a PE teacher and assistant headteacher at Martin High School, Anstey, Leicestershire, England.

At the same time he participated in the 2016 Olympics, one of Seaward's pupils at Martin High School also went to the Olympics as part of the Great Britain team as a Team GB youth archery ambassador.
