= Derek Hawkins (runner) =

British distance runner (born 1989)

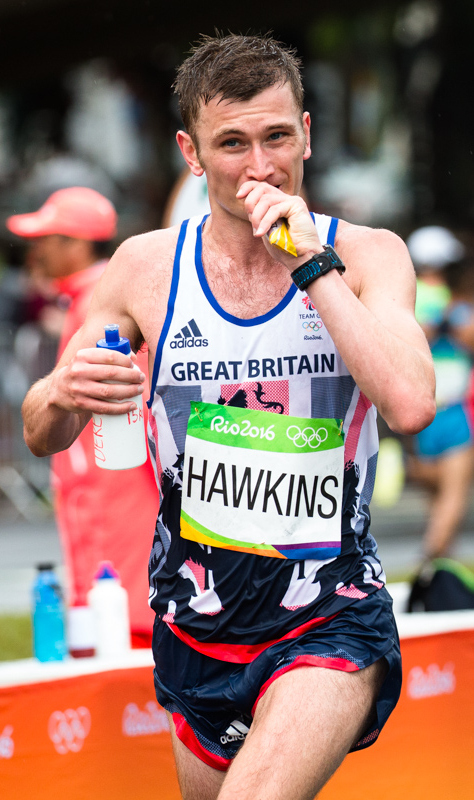
- Hawkins at the 2016 Olympics

Personal information
- Full name: Derek John Hawkins
- Born: 29 April 1989 (age 37) Johnstone, Scotland
- Education: University of Glasgow
- Height: 180 cm (5 ft 11 in)
- Weight: 68 kg (150 lb)

Sport
- Sport: Athletics
- Event(s): Marathon, half marathon
- Club: Leeds City Athletic Club; Kilbarchan Amateur Athletic Club
- Coached by: Robert Hawkins (father)

Achievements and titles
- Personal best(s): Marathon – 2:12:49 (2019); HM – 1:03:53 (2016)

Derek John Hawkins (born 29 April 1989) is a British distance runner. He competed in the marathon at the 2016 Summer Olympics and placed 114th.

== Personal life ==
Hawkins was born on 29 April 1989. His younger brother Callum is also a long-distance runner. In addition to his training schedule he worked part-time in a local supermarket. In 2016 he and Callum launched Hawkins Running, an online coaching service for distance runners.

== Athletics ==
Hawkins won the Scottish cross country championships in 2011 and 2012. In 2012 he ran his first marathon, competing in Frankfurt and finishing in a time of two hours 14 minutes and 4 seconds.

At the 2013 London Marathon, in his second competition over the distance, he was the highest placed British athlete, finishing 13th in a time of two hours 16 minutes and 51 seconds. This result qualified him for the 2013 World Championships in Athletics, but Hawkins decided not to compete in Moscow in order to focus on his preparation for the 2014 Commonwealth Games.

Hawkins competed at the 2014 Commonwealth Games held in Glasgow, Scotland, representing the host nation in the men's marathon. He finished ninth in a time of two hours 14 minutes and 15 seconds, 11 seconds slower than his personal best, but was the highest finishing British athlete in a race won by Australia's Michael Shelley.

At the 2016 London Marathon, Hawkins finished 14th overall, and was the third British-qualified athlete to finish, in a personal best time of two hours 12 minutes and 57 seconds. This time was inside the qualifying time of two hours 14 minutes needed for the 2016 Summer Olympics to be held in Rio de Janeiro, Brazil but as he was outside of the top two British finishers he did not achieve automatic selection for the Great Britain team. He was later chosen as a selectors pick for the Games and will be joined in the men's marathon by fellow British athletes, Tsegai Tewelde and his brother Callum.
