= Uruguay at the 2023 World Athletics Championships =

- Flag of Uruguay
- WA code: URU

in Budapest, Hungary 19 August 2023 – 27 August 2023
- Competitors: 6 (6 men and 0 women)
- Medals: Gold 0 Silver 0 Bronze 0 Total 0

World Athletics Championships appearances
- 1983; 1987; 1991; 1993; 1995; 1997; 1999; 2001; 2003; 2005; 2007; 2009; 2011; 2013; 2015; 2017; 2019; 2022; 2023

Uruguay competed at the 2023 World Athletics Championships in Budapest, Hungary, from 19 to 27 August 2023.

== Results ==
Uruguay entered 6 athletes.

Key

- Q = Qualified for the next round
- q = Qualified for the next round as a fastest loser or, in field events, by position without achieving the qualifying target
- NR = National record
- PB = Personal best
- SB = Season best
- N/A = Round not applicable for the event

=== Men ===
Track and road events

Athlete	Event	Heat		Final	
Athlete	Event	Result	Rank	Result	Rank
Valentín Soca	5000 metres	14:16.15	21	Did not advance	
Santiago Catrofe	10,000 metres	—		28:28.49 NR	17
Nicolás Cuestas	Marathon	—		2:19:20	44
Cristhian Zamora	Marathon	—		DNS	
Andrés Zamora	Marathon	—		2:20:59	47

Field events

Athlete	Event	Qualification		Final	
Athlete	Event	Distance	Position	Distance	Position
Emiliano Lasa	Long jump	7.72	24	Did not advance	
