= Bhumiraj Rai =

Nepalese long-distance runner

Personal information
- Born: 22 June 1989 (age 36)

Sport
- Country: Nepal
- Sport: Long-distance running

Bhumiraj Rai (born 22 June 1989) is a Nepalese long-distance runner. In 2017, he competed in the men's marathon at the 2017 World Championships in Athletics held in London, United Kingdom. He did not finish his race.
