= Namibia at the 2009 World Championships in Athletics =

- WA code: NAM

in Berlin
- Competitors: 4
- Medals: Gold 0 Silver 0 Bronze 0 Total 0

World Championships in Athletics appearances
- 1991; 1993; 1995; 1997; 1999; 2001; 2003; 2005; 2007; 2009; 2011; 2013; 2015; 2017; 2019; 2022; 2023

Namibia competed at the 2009 World Championships in Athletics from 15 to 23 August in Berlin.

== Team selection ==
Track and road events

Event	Athletes	
Event	Men	Women
Marathon	Reinhold Ndalikokule Iita	Hilaria Johannes; Beata Naigambo

Field and combined events

Event	Athletes	
Event	Men	Women
Long jump	Stephan Louw	

== Results ==
=== Men ===
Track and road events

Event	Athletes	Final	
Event	Athletes	Result	Rank
Marathon	Reinhold Ndalikokule Iita	DNF	

Field events

Event	Athletes	Qualification		Final	
Event	Athletes	Result	Rank	Result	Rank
Long jump	Stephan Louw	7.74	30	did not advance	

=== Women ===
Track and road events

Event	Athletes	Final	
Event	Athletes	Result	Rank
Marathon	Hilaria Johannes	2:50:19 SB	56
Marathon	Beata Naigambo	2:33:05 PB	24
