= Namibia at the 2011 World Championships in Athletics =

- WA code: NAM
- National federation: Athletics Namibia

in Daegu
- Competitors: 2
- Medals: Gold 0 Silver 0 Bronze 0 Total 0

World Championships in Athletics appearances
- 1991; 1993; 1995; 1997; 1999; 2001; 2003; 2005; 2007; 2009; 2011; 2013; 2015; 2017; 2019; 2022; 2023

Namibia competed at the 2011 World Championships in Athletics from August 27 to September 4 in Daegu, South Korea. A team of 2 athletes was announced to represent the country in the event.

== Results ==
=== Men ===
Athlete	Event	Preliminaries		Heats		Semifinals		Final	
Athlete	Event	Time Width Height	Rank	Time Width Height	Rank	Time Width Height	Rank	Time Width Height	Rank
Daniel Nghipandulwa	800 metres			1:48.79	33	Did not advance			

=== Women ===
Athlete	Event	Preliminaries		Heats		Semifinals		Final	
Athlete	Event	Time Width Height	Rank	Time Width Height	Rank	Time Width Height	Rank	Time Width Height	Rank
Tjipekapora Herunga	400 metres			54.08	29	Did not advance			
