= Solomon Mutai =

Ugandan long-distance runner

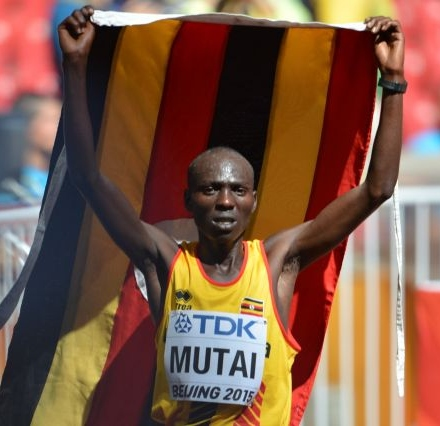
- Mutai at the 2015 World Championships

Medal record

Men's athletics

Representing Uganda

World Championships
Bronze medal – third place	2015 Beijing	Marathon

Commonwealth Games
Silver medal – second place	2018 Gold Coast	Marathon

Munyo Solomon Mutai (born 22 October 1992 in Bukwo) is a Ugandan long-distance runner.

He started his career over shorter distances and at the 2009 Ugandan Championships he placed ninth over 1500 metres and fourth in the 3000 metres steeplechase. At the age of 18 years he was runner-up at the national 5000 metres, second to Moses Kipsiro. His half marathon debut came in Kampala and he was runner-up behind his compatriot Nathan Ayeko with a time of 1:01:26 hours. He set two personal bests at the 2013 Ugandan Championships, running 13:33.80 minutes for the 5000 m and 28:44.81 minutes for the 10,000 metres, having placed fourth at both distances. He made his debut in road events at the end of the year and was in the top ten at the BOClassic and Corrida de Houilles 10K runs. He also won the half marathon section of the Nairobi Marathon that year.

He made his international debut for Uganda at the 2014 IAAF World Half Marathon Championships and helped Uganda to fifth in the team race by finishing 26th overall. He was then selected to run the marathon at the 2014 Commonwealth Games where he finished fourth. He won a silver medal at the marathon event at the 2018 Commonwealth Games.

== Personal bests ==
- 1500 metres – 3:50.8 min (2009)
- 5000 metres – 13:33.80 min (2013)
- 10,000 metres – 28:44.81 min (2013)
- 10K run – 28:45 min (2013)
- Half marathon – 1:01:26 hrs (2014)
- 3000 metres steeplechase – 9:15.4 min (2009)
- marathon – 2:08:10 hrs (2022)

== International competition record ==
Year	Competition	Venue	Position	Event	Notes
2014	IAAF World Half Marathon Championships	Kavarna, Bulgaria	26th	Half marathon	
2014	IAAF World Half Marathon Championships	Kavarna, Bulgaria	5th	Team	
2015	World Championships	Beijing, China	3rd	Marathon	2:13:29
2019	World Championships	Doha, Qatar	–	Marathon	DNF
2025	World Championships	Tokyo, Japan	–	Marathon	DNF
