= Tomas Hilifa Rainhold =

Namibian long-distance runner

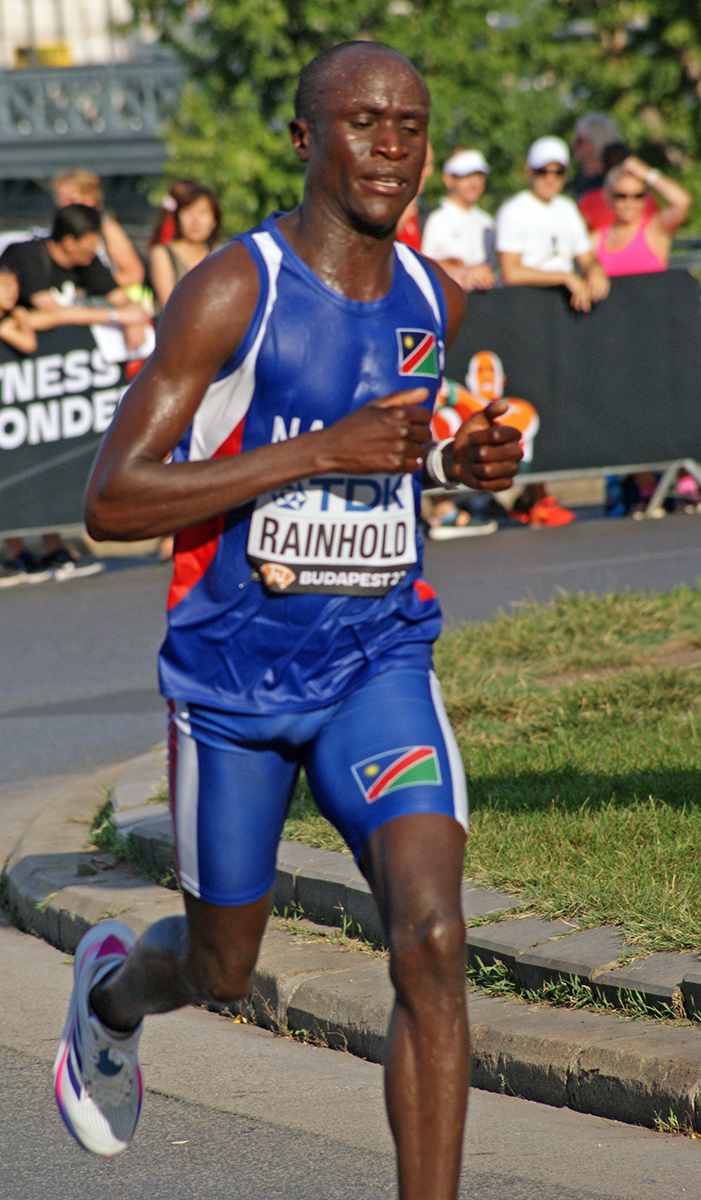

Personal information
- Born: 7 February 1991 (age 34)

Sport
- Country: Namibia
- Sport: Long-distance running

Tomas Hilifa Rainhold (actually Reinhardt Thomas, born 7 February 1991), is a Namibian long-distance runner. He competed in the men's marathon at the 2019 World Athletics Championships held in Doha, Qatar. He finished in 17th place.

In 2018, he competed in the men's half marathon at the IAAF World Half Marathon Championships held in Valencia, Spain. He finished in 111th place.

In 2021, he competed at the Xiamen Marathon and Tuscany Camp Global Elite Race in Siena, Italy. He finished 28th in 2:10:24, a personal best. This performance qualified him for the men's marathon at the 2020 Summer Olympics in Tokyo, Japan.

He competed at the 2022 Commonwealth Games where he finished 13th in the men's marathon event.
