= Nepal at the 2011 World Championships in Athletics =

- WA code: NEP
- National federation: Nepal Amateur Athletics Association

in Daegu
- Competitors: 2
- Medals: Gold 0 Silver 0 Bronze 0 Total 0

World Championships in Athletics appearances
- 1983; 1987; 1991; 1993; 1995; 1997; 1999; 2001; 2003; 2005; 2007; 2009; 2011; 2013; 2015; 2017; 2019; 2022; 2023

Nepal competed at the 2011 World Championships in Athletics from August 27 to September 4 in Daegu, South Korea as the host nation. A team of 2 athletes was announced to represent the country in the event.

== Results ==
=== Men ===
Athlete	Event	Preliminaries		Heats		Semifinals		Final	
Athlete	Event	Time Width Height	Rank	Time Width Height	Rank	Time Width Height	Rank	Time Width Height	Rank
Tilak Ram Tharu	100 metres	11.00 (PB)	12 (Q)	11.32	55	Did not advance			

=== Women ===
Athlete	Event	Preliminaries		Heats		Semifinals		Final	
Athlete	Event	Time Width Height	Rank	Time Width Height	Rank	Time Width Height	Rank	Time Width Height	Rank
Chandra Kala Thapa	100 metres	13.17 (SB)	25	Did not advance					
