= Sydney Half Marathon =

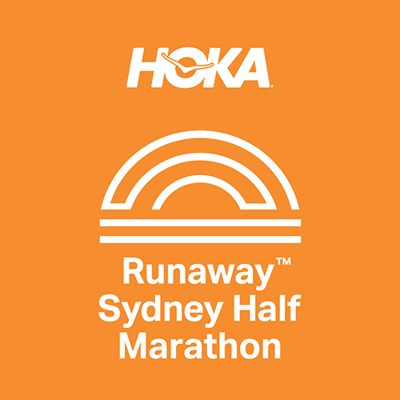
- Date: May
- Location: Sydney, Australia
- Event type: Road
- Distance: Half marathon (also 10 km)
- Established: 1992 (34 years ago)
- Course records: Men's: 2:07:03 (1994) (Australia) Pat Caroll; Women's: 2:24:33 (1996) (Australia) Nyla Caroll
- Website: Sydney Half Marathon
- Participants: 17,000 (2024)

The Sydney Half Marathon, currently branded as the HOKA Runaway Sydney Half Marathon for sponsorship reasons, is an annual half marathon through Sydney's central business district. The course takes in such sites as The Rocks, the Sydney Harbour Bridge, the Sydney Opera House, and the Royal Botanic Gardens. The race starts next to at Macquarie Street, and finishes in Hyde Park. Prior to 2008, the course ran a similar route, but started and finished near The Rocks. In 2024, the event had over 17,000 runners, making it Australia's largest half marathon race.

The event is accompanied by a fundraising initiative primarily targeted at Breast Cancer Network Australia, in memory of Kerryn McCann, who succumbed to breast cancer in December 2008.
