= Alina Armas =

Namibian long-distance runner (born 1983)

Personal information
- Born: 10 September 1983 (age 42) Ondangwa, South West Africa

Sport
- Sport: Track and field
- Event: Marathon

Alina Armas (born 10 September 1983) is a Namibian long-distance runner who specialises in the marathon. She competed in the women's marathon event at the 2016 Summer Olympics.
