= Paulus Iiyambo =

Namibian long-distance runner

Personal information
- Nationality: Namibian
- Born: 18 March 1982 (age 44)

Sport
- Sport: Long-distance running
- Event: Marathon

Paulus Iiyambo (born 18 March 1982) is a Namibian long-distance runner. He competed in the men's marathon at the 2017 World Championships in Athletics, placing 37th in a time of 2:19:45.
