= Andrés Zamora =

Uruguayan long-distance runner

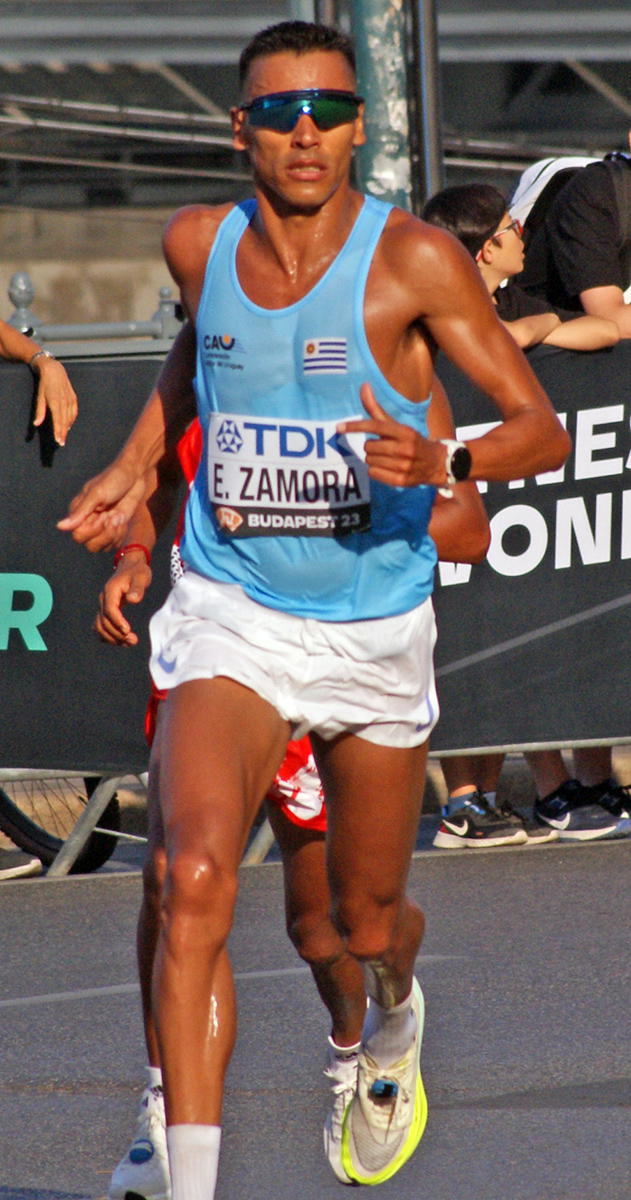

Personal information
- Full name: Ernesto Andrés Zamora Sugo
- Born: 13 April 1983 (age 43) Montevideo, Uruguay

Sport
- Sport: Track and field
- Event: Marathon

Ernesto Andrés Zamora Sugo (born 13 April 1983) is a Uruguayan long-distance runner who specialises in the marathon. He competed in the men's marathon event at the 2016 Summer Olympics held in Rio de Janeiro, Brazil. In 2017, he competed in the men's marathon event at the 2017 World Championships in Athletics held in London, England.

His father Nelson Zamora and his brother Cristhian Zamora are also long-distance runners.

In July 2025, the Uruguayan National Anti-Doping Organization announced that Zamara had been issued with a four-year ban to run from January 2024 to January 2028 for an anti-doping rule violation after testing positive for anabolic steroids.
