= Déborah Rodríguez =

Uruguayan athlete (born 1992)

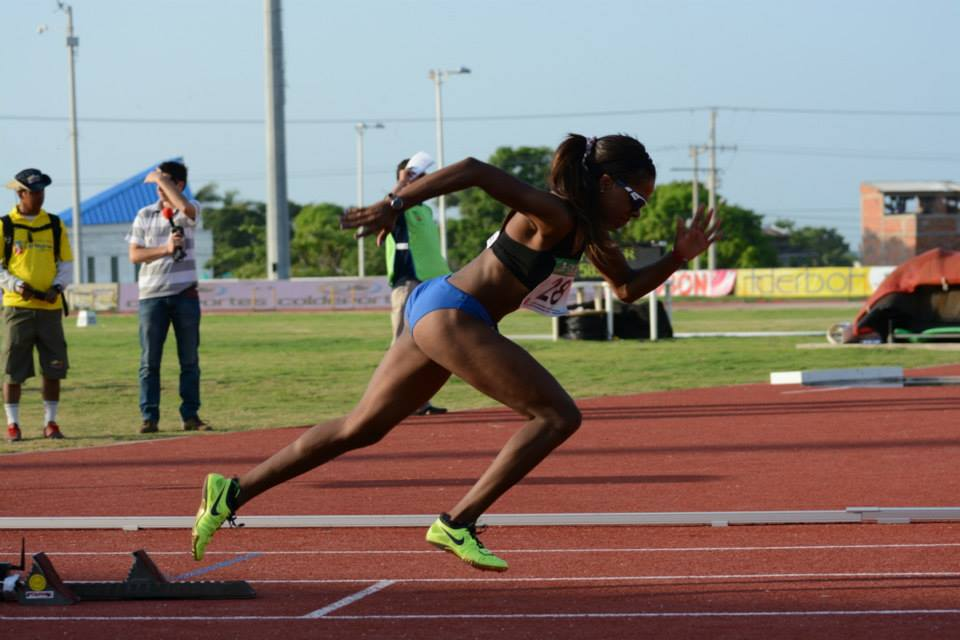

Personal information
- Full name: Déborah Lizeth Rodríguez Guelmo
- Born: December 2, 1992 (age 33) Montevideo, Uruguay
- Height: 1.74 m (5 ft 9 in)
- Weight: 63 kg (139 lb)

Sport
- Country: Uruguay
- Sport: Athletics
- Events: 400 m hurdles 800 m
Medal record
Representing Uruguay
Pan American Games
Bronze medal – third place	2015 Toronto	400 m hurdles
Bronze medal – third place	2019 Lima	800 m
Silver medal – second place	2023 Santiago	800 m

Déborah Lizeth Rodríguez Guelmo (born December 2, 1992) is a Uruguayan athlete and fashion model. She is also the twin sister of football player Ángel Rodríguez of River Plate Montevideo.

== Athletic career (2008–present) ==
At the 2010 South American Under-23 Championships in Athletics, she won a silver medal in the Women's 400m hurdles event, and also won two golds in the same event at the 2008 and 2011 South American Junior Championships in Athletics. Rodríguez also won bronze at the 2011 Pan American Junior Athletics Championships. She competed in the Women's 400m hurdles event at the 2012 Summer Olympics but ranked 28th and was eliminated in the first round even though she broke the national Women's 400m hurdles record (57.04 seconds), which Rodríguez previously held in 2011 with 58.63. She also holds the national record at 400 metres-52.53 and 800 metres-2:01.46.

=== Personal bests ===
Event	Result	Venue	Date
100 m	12.18 s (wind: +0.4 m/s)	(Uruguay) Montevideo	30 Aug 2014
200 m	24.51 s (wind: +0.8 m/s)	(Uruguay) Montevideo	31 Aug 2014
400 m	52.53 s	(Uruguay) Montevideo	3 Oct 2014
800 m	2'00,20 min	(Switzerland) Geneva	12 Jun 2021
100 m hurdles	14.61 s (wind: NWI)	(Argentina) Buenos Aires	8 Feb 2014
400 m hurdles	56.30 s	(China) Beijing	23 Aug 2015

== Modeling ventures (2013–present) ==
Déborah Rodríguez
- Occupations: Runway, fashion, commercial, publicity
- Years active: 2013–present
- Modeling information
- Height: 1.74 m (5 ft 9 in)
- Hair color: Black
- Eye color: Brown
- Manager: Cristino Management

In January, 2013 Rodríguez was signed into a modeling agency by Fernando Cristino called Cristino Management.

== Achievements in athletics ==
Year	Competition	Venue	Position	Event	Notes
Representing Uruguay
2007	World Youth Championships	Ostrava, Czech Republic	7th (h)	400 m	58.62
2008	South American U23 Championships	Lima, Peru	4th	400 m hurdles	1:02.91
2008	South American Youth Championships	Lima, Peru	1st	400 m hurdles	61.27
2009	South American Championships	Lima, Peru	4th	400 m hurdles	60.07
2009	World Youth Championship	Bressanone, Italy	3rd	400 m hurdles	59.71
2009	South American Junior Championships	São Paulo, Brazil	1st	400 m hurdles	59.97
2009	World Championships	Berlin, Germany	35th (h)	400 m hurdles	59.21
2010	South American Under-23 Championships	Medellín, Colombia	2nd	400 m hurdles	59.76
2010	Ibero-American Championships	San Fernando, Spain	10th (h)	400 m hurdles	60.96
2010	World Junior Championships	Moncton, Canada	13th (h)	400 m hurdles	60.39
2011	South American Championships	Buenos Aires, Argentina	3rd	400 m hurdles	58.63
2011	Pan American Junior Championships	Miramar, United States	3rd	400 m hurdles	59.10
2011	World Championships	Daegu, South Korea	35th (h)	400 m hurdles	59.52
2011	South American Junior Championships	Medellín, Colombia	1st	400 m hurdles	60.60 A
2011	Pan American Games	Guadalajara, Mexico	11th (sf)	400 m hurdles	60.72 A
2012	World Indoor Championships	Istanbul, Turkey	22nd (h)	400 m	57.08
2012	Ibero-American Championships	Barquisimeto, Venezuela	8th	400 m hurdles	59.75
2012	Olympic Games	London, United Kingdom	7th (h)	400 m hurdles	57.04
2012	South American U-23 Championships	São Paulo, Brazil	1st	400 m hurdles	57.63
2013	South American Championships	Cartagena, Colombia	2nd	400 m hurdles	58.06
2014	South American Games	Santiago, Chile	1st	800 m	2:06.62
2014	South American Games	Santiago, Chile	1st	400 m hurdles	56.60
2014	Ibero-American Championships	São Paulo, Brazil	2nd	400 m hurdles	57.56
2014	Pan American Sports Festival	Mexico City, Mexico	5th	400 m hurdles	58.35 A
2014	South American U23 Championships	Montevideo, Uruguay	1st	400 m	52.53
2014	South American U23 Championships	Montevideo, Uruguay	1st	800 m	2:08.65
2014	South American U23 Championships	Montevideo, Uruguay	1st	400 m hurdles	58.49
2014	South American U23 Championships	Montevideo, Uruguay	3rd	4 × 400 m relay	3:50.35
2015	South American Championships	Lima, Peru	1st	800 m	2:01.46
2015	South American Championships	Lima, Peru	1st	400 m hurdles	56.33
2015	Pan American Games	Toronto, Canada	3rd	400 m hurdles	56.41
2015	World Championships	Beijing, China	21st (sf)	400 m hurdles	56.47
2015	World Championships	Beijing, China	34th (h)	800 m	2:02.46
2016	Ibero-American Championships	Rio de Janeiro, Brazil	1st	400 m hurdles	57.22
2016	Olympic Games	Rio de Janeiro, Brazil	41st (h)	800 m	2:01.86
2017	South American Championships	Asunción, Paraguay	3rd	800 m	2:07.41
2017	World Championships	London, United Kingdom	35th (h)	400 m hurdles	57.61
2018	South American Games	Cochabamba, Bolivia	1st	800 m	2:16.21
2018	Ibero-American Championships	Trujillo, Peru	2nd	800 m	2:06.19
2019	South American Championships	Lima, Peru	1st	800 m	2:02.68
2019	Pan American Games	Lima, Peru	3rd	800 m	2:01.66
2019	World Championships	Doha, Qatar	34th (h)	800 m	2:03.80
2020	South American Indoor Championships	Cochabamba, Bolivia	1st	800 m	2:14.14
2021	South American Championships	Guayaquil, Ecuador	1st	800 m	2:03.38
2021	Olympic Games	Tokyo, Japan	19th (sf)	800 m	2:01.76
2022	South American Indoor Championships	Cochabamba, Bolivia	1st	800 m	2:18.23
2022	Ibero-American Championships	La Nucía, Spain	1st	800 m	2:02.53
2022	World Championships	Eugene, United States	36th (h)	800 m	2:03.04
2022	South American Games	Asunción, Paraguay	1st	800 m	2:08.14
2023	South American Championships	São Paulo, Brazil	2nd	800 m	2:03.94
2023	Pan American Games	Santiago, Chile	2nd	800 m	2:02.88
2024	Ibero-American Championships	Cuiabá, Brazil	3rd	800 m	2:03.32
2025	South American Championships	Mar del Plata, Argentina	1st	800 m	2:04.70
2025	World Championships	Tokyo, Japan	51st (h)	800 m	2:03.18
2026	Ibero-American Championships	Lima, Peru	1st	800 m	2:03.39
2026	Pan American Championships	Medellín, Colombia	9th	800 m	2:11.31
2026	South American Games	Santa Fe, Argentina	2nd	800 m	2:04.16

Olympic Games
Preceded by Dolores Moreira	Flagbearer; Tokyo 2020; With: Bruno Cetraro for Uruguay	Succeeded by
