= Japan at the 2025 World Athletics Championships =

- Flag of Japan
- WA code: JPN

in Tokyo, Japan September 13-21, 2025
- Medals Ranked 40th: Gold 0 Silver 0 Bronze 2 Total 2

World Athletics Championships appearances
- 1983; 1987; 1991; 1993; 1995; 1997; 1999; 2001; 2003; 2005; 2007; 2009; 2011; 2013; 2015; 2017; 2019; 2022; 2023; 2025

Japan competed at the 2025 World Athletics Championships in Tokyo, Japan, from 13 to 21 September 2025.

== Medallists ==
Medal	Athlete	Event	Date
Bronze	Hayato Katsuki	Men's 35 kilometres walk	September 13
Bronze	Nanako Fujii	Women's 20 kilometres walk	September 20

== Results ==
Key

- Q = Qualified for the next round
- q = Qualified for the next round as a fastest loser or, in field events, by position without achieving the qualifying target
- NR = National record
- PB = Personal best
- SB = Season best
- N/A = Round not applicable for the event

=== Men ===
Track and road events

Athlete	Event	Heat		Semifinal		Final	
Athlete	Event	Result	Rank	Result	Rank	Result	Rank
Yoshihide Kiryu	100 metres	10.28	5	Did not advance			
Yuhi Mori	100 metres	10.37	7	Did not advance			
Abdul Hakim Sani Brown	100 metres	10.37	7	Did not advance			
Shunsuke Izumiya	110 metres hurdles	13.52	5 q	Did not finish		Did not advance	
Rachid Muratake	110 metres hurdles	13.22	2 Q	13.19	2 Q	13.18	5
Shūsei Nomoto	110 metres hurdles	13.29	4 Q	13.30	3	Did not advance	
Shōta Iizuka	200 metres	20.64	6	Did not advance			
Soshi Mizukubo	200 metres	20.51 SB	7	Did not advance			
Towa Uzawa	200 metres	20.39	3 Q	20.23	6	Did not advance	
Yuki Joseph Nakajima	400 metres	44.44 NR	2 Q	44.53	2 Q	44.62	6
Fuga Satō	400 metres	45.10 SB	5	Did not advance			
Shunta Inoue	400 metres hurdles	49.73	8	Did not advance			
Daiki Ogawa	400 metres hurdles	50.08	6	Did not advance			
Ken Toyoda	400 metres hurdles	51.80	8	Did not advance			
Ko Ochiai	800 metres	1:46.78	7	Did not advance			
Kazuto Iizawa	1500 metres	3:41.76	13	Did not advance			
Ryuji Miura	3000 metres steeplechase	8:30.43	3 Q	—N/a		8:35.90	8
Nagiya Mori	5000 metres	13:29.44	15	Did not advance			
Jun Kasai	10000 metres	—N/a				29:41.84	22
Mebuki Suzuki	10000 metres	—N/a				29:33.60	20
Yoshihide Kiryu; Yūki Koike; Hiroki Yanagita; Towa Uzawa	4 × 100 metres relay	38.07	3 Q	—N/a		38.35	6
Kenki Imaizumi; Fuga Satō; Yuki Joseph Nakajima; Takuho Yoshizu	4 × 400 metres relay	2:59.74 SB	6	—N/a		Did not advance	

Athlete	Event	Final	
Athlete	Event	Result	Rank
Ryota Kondo	Marathon	2:10:53	11
Yuya Yoshida	Marathon	2:16:58 SB	34
Naoki Koyama	Marathon	2:13:42	23
Satoshi Maruo	20 kilometres walk	1:20:09	9
Toshikazu Yamanishi	20 kilometres walk	1:22:39	28
Kento Yoshikawa	20 kilometres walk	1:19:46	7
Hayato Katsuki	35 kilometres walk	2:29:16	3rd place, bronze medalist(s)
Masatora Kawano	35 kilometres walk	2:37:15 SB	18
Satoshi Maruo	35 kilometres walk	2:40:29	26

Field events

Athlete	Event	Qualification		Final	
Athlete	Event	Distance	Position	Distance	Position
Masateru Yugami	Discus throw	56.40	37	Did not advance	
Shōta Fukuda	Hammer throw	72.71	26	Did not advance	
Roderick Genki Dean	Javelin throw	77.01	31	Did not advance	
Gen Naganuma	Javelin throw	74.70	36	Did not advance	
Yuta Sakiyama	Javelin throw	77.61	29	Did not advance	
Ryōichi Akamatsu	High jump	2.25	1 q	2.24	8
Yuto Seko	High jump	2.25	4 q	2.20	10
Tomohiro Shinno	High jump	2.21	14	Did not advance	
Yuki Hashioka	Long jump	7.95	13	Did not advance	
Riku Ito	Long jump	7.68	27	Did not advance	
Hibiki Tsuha	Long jump	7.42	36	Did not advance	

=== Women ===
Track and road events

Athlete	Event	Heat		Semifinal		Final	
Athlete	Event	Result	Rank	Result	Rank	Result	Rank
Mako Fukube	100 metres hurdles	12.92	4 q	13.06	7	Did not advance	
Hitomi Nakajima	100 metres hurdles	12.88	5 q	13.02	7	Did not advance	
Yumi Tanaka	100 metres hurdles	13.05	6	Did not advance			
Abigeirufuka Ido	200 metres	22.98	5 q	23.15	8	Did not advance	
Nanako Matsumoto	400 metres	52.41	7	Did not advance			
Rin Kubo	800 metres	2:02.84	7	Did not advance			
Tomoka Kimura	1500 metres	4:15.70	14	Did not advance			
Nozomi Tanaka	1500 metres	4:07.34	10	Did not advance			
Miu Saito	3000 metres steeplechase	9:24.72 NR	6	—N/a		Did not advance	
Ririka Hironaka	5000 metres	15:10.68	13	—N/a		Did not advance	
Nozomi Tanaka	5000 metres	14:47.14	5 Q	—N/a		15:07.34	12
Yuma Yamamoto	5000 metres	15:36.29	14	—N/a		Did not advance	
Ririka Hironaka	10,000 metres	—N/a				31:09.62	6
Mikuni Yada	10,000 metres	—N/a				32:28.94	20

Athlete	Event	Final	
Athlete	Event	Result	Rank
Yuka Andō	Marathon	2:35:37	28
Kana Kobayashi	Marathon	2:28:50	7
Sayaka Sato	Marathon	2:31:15	13
Nanako Fujii	20 kilometres walk	1:26:18 NR	3rd place, bronze medalist(s)
Kumiko Okada	20 kilometres walk	1:30:12	18
Ayane Yanai	20 kilometres walk	1:35:44	37
Masumi Fuchise	35 kilometres walk	3:03:29	21
Yukiko Umeno	35 kilometres walk	2:56:28	15
Maika Yagi	35 kilometres walk	3:00:08	20

Field events

Athlete	Event	Qualification		Final	
Athlete	Event	Distance	Position	Distance	Position
Misaki Morota	Pole vault	4.25	26	Did not advance	
Nagisa Takahashi	High jump	1.88	22	Did not advance	
Sumire Hata	Long jump	6.45	20	Did not advance	
Mariko Morimoto	Triple jump	13.10	35	Did not advance	
Maoko Takashima	Triple jump	13.66	25	Did not advance	
Haruka Kitaguchi	Javelin throw	60.38	14	Did not advance	
Sae Takemoto	Javelin throw	55.11	30	Did not advance	
Momone Ueda	Javelin throw	60.49	13	Did not advance	
Nanaka Kori	Discus throw	54.59	36	Did not advance	

=== Mixed ===
Athlete	Event	Heat		Final	
Athlete	Event	Result	Rank	Result	Rank
Abigeirufuka Ido (W); Kenki Imaizumi (M); Nanako Matsumoto (W); Takuho Yoshizu (M)	4 × 400 metres relay	3:12.08 NR	5 q	3:17.53	8
