= Kenya at the 2025 World Athletics Championships =

- Flag of Kenya
- WA code: KEN

in Tokyo, Japan September 13–21, 2025
- Competitors: 62 (38 men and 24 women)
- Medals Ranked 2nd: Gold 7 Silver 2 Bronze 2 Total 11

World Athletics Championships appearances (overview)
- 1983; 1987; 1991; 1993; 1995; 1997; 1999; 2001; 2003; 2005; 2007; 2009; 2011; 2013; 2015; 2017; 2019; 2022; 2023; 2025

Kenya competed at the 2025 World Athletics Championships in Tokyo, Japan, from 13 to 21 September 2025.

== Medallists ==
Medal	Athlete	Event	Date
Gold	Beatrice Chebet	Women's 10,000 metres	13 September
Gold	Peres Jepchirchir	Women's marathon	14 September
Gold	Faith Kipyegon	Women's 1500 metres	16 September
Gold	Faith Cherotich	Women's 3000 metres steeplechase	17 September
Gold	Beatrice Chebet	Women's 5000 metres	20 September
Gold	Emmanuel Wanyonyi	Men's 800 metres	20 September
Gold	Lilian Odira	Women's 800 metres	21 September
Silver	Dorcus Ewoi	Women's 1500 metres	16 September
Silver	Faith Kipyegon	Women's 5000 metres	20 September
Bronze	Edmund Serem	Men's 3000 metres steeplechase	15 September
Bronze	Reynold Cheruiyot	Men's 1500 metres	17 September

== Results ==
Key

- Q = Qualified for the next round
- q = Qualified for the next round as a fastest loser or, in field events, by position without achieving the qualifying target
- NR = National record
- PB = Personal best
- SB = Season best
- N/A = Round not applicable for the event

=== Men ===
Track and road events

Athlete	Event	Heat		Semifinal		Final	
Athlete	Event	Result	Rank	Result	Rank	Result	Rank
Ferdinand Omanyala	100 metres	10.12	3 Q	10.09	5	Did not advance	
Kevin Kipkorir	400 metres	45.39	6	Did not advance			
George Mutinda	400 metres	45.07	5	Did not advance			
Brian Tinega	400 metres	45.13	6	Did not advance			
Nicholas Kebenei	800 metres	1:44.91	4 q	1:49.54	8	Did not advance	
Ngeno Kipngetich	800 metres	1:45.37	6	Did not advance			
Kelvin Loti	800 metres	1:45.35	2 Q	1:44.82	7	Did not advance	
Emmanuel Wanyonyi	800 metres	1:45.05	1 Q	1:43.47	2 Q	1:41.86 CR	1st place, gold medalist(s)
Reynold Cheruiyot	1500 metres	3:41.17	4 Q	3:36.64	1 Q	3:34.25	3rd place, bronze medalist(s)
Timothy Cheruiyot	1500 metres	3:42.20	4 Q	3:35.61	4 Q	3:34.50	4
Phanuel Koech	1500 metres	3:42.77	12	Did not advance			
Cornelius Kemboi	5000 metres	13:45.79	12	—N/a		Did not advance	
Mathew Kipsang	5000 metres	13:13.33	2 Q	—N/a		13:03.67	11
Jacob Krop	5000 metres	13:28.73	14	—N/a		Did not advance	
Ishmael Kipkurui	10,000 metres	—N/a				28:56.48	4
Benson Kiplangat	10,000 metres	—N/a				Did not finish	
Edwin Kurgat	10,000 metres	—N/a				28:57.83	7
Kennedy Kimutai	Marathon	—N/a				2:11:45	16
Hillary Kipkoech	Marathon	—N/a				DNF	
Vincent Kipkemoi	Marathon	—N/a				2:13:38	22
Wiseman Mukhobe	400 metres hurdles	48.27 PB	5 q	48.65	6	Did not advance	
Abraham Kibiwot	3000 metres steeplechase	8:27.84	5 Q	—N/a		Did not finish	
Simon Koech	3000 metres steeplechase	8:31.80	7	—N/a		Did not advance	
Edmund Serem	3000 metres steeplechase	8:29.97	1 Q	—N/a		8:34.56	3rd place, bronze medalist(s)
Meshack Kitsubuli Babu; Boniface Mweresa; Mark Odhiambo; Steve Odhiambo Onyango	4 × 100 metres relay	38.56	6	—N/a		Did not advance	
David Kapirante; Kevin Kipkorir; Dennis Masika Mulongo; George Mutinda	4 × 400 metres relay	3:00.39	2	—N/a		Did not advance	

Field events

Athlete	Event	Qualification		Final	
Athlete	Event	Distance	Position	Distance	Position
Julius Yego	Javelin	85.96 SB	3 Q	85.54	6

=== Women ===
Track and road events

Athlete	Event	Heat		Semifinal		Final	
Athlete	Event	Result	Rank	Result	Rank	Result	Rank
Mercy Oketch	400 metres	50.76	3 Q	51.36	7	Did not advance	
Vivian Chebet Kiprotich	800 metres	2:00.68	5	Did not advance			
Mary Moraa	800 metres	1:58.44	2 Q	1:58.40	1 Q	1:57.10 SB	7
Sarah Moraa	800 metres	2:01.62	6 qJ	1:57.53 PB	2 Q	1:55.74 PB	4
Lilian Odira	800 metres	1:57.86	1 Q	1:56.85	1 Q	1:54.62 CR	1st place, gold medalist(s)
Nelly Chepchirchir	1500 metres	4:07.01	1 Q	4:06.86	1 Q	3:55.25 PB	4
Susan Ejore	1500 metres	4:01.99	3 Q	4:09.28	7	Did not advance	
Dorcus Ewoi	1500 metres	4:04.99	4 Q	4:00.65	2 Q	3:54.92 PB	2nd place, silver medalist(s)
Faith Kipyegon	1500 metres	4:02.55	1 Q	4:00.34	1 Q	3:52.15	1st place, gold medalist(s)
Margaret Akidor	5000 metres	15:10.91	14	—N/a		Did not advance	
Beatrice Chebet	5000 metres	14:45.59	1 Q	—N/a		14:54.36	1st place, gold medalist(s)
Faith Kipyegon	5000 metres	14:56.71 SB	2 Q	—N/a		14:55.07 SB	2nd place, silver medalist(s)
Agnes Jebet Ngetich	5000 metres	14:57.90	8 Q	—N/a		15:13.78	15
Beatrice Chebet	10,000 metres	—N/a				30:37.61	1st place, gold medalist(s)
Janeth Chepngetich	10,000 metres	—N/a				DNF	
Agnes Jebet Ngetich	10,000 metres	—N/a				30:42.66	4
Jackline Cherono	Marathon	—N/a				2:33:17	18
Peres Jepchirchir	Marathon	—N/a				2:24:43 SB	1st place, gold medalist(s)
Magdalyne Masai	Marathon	—N/a				DNF	
Celestine Jepkosgei Biwot	3000 metres steeplechase	9:22.55	7	—N/a		Did not advance	
Faith Cherotich	3000 metres steeplechase	9:13.95	1 Q	—N/a		8:51.59 CR	1st place, gold medalist(s)
Pamela Kosgei	3000 metres steeplechase	9:28.21	10	—N/a		Did not advance	
Doris Lemngole	3000 metres steeplechase	9:08.97	2 Q	—N/a		9:02.39	5

Field events

Athlete	Event	Qualification		Final	
Athlete	Event	Distance	Position	Distance	Position
Irene Jepkemboi	Javelin	56.55	24	Did not advance	

=== Mixed ===
Athlete	Event	Heat		Final	
Athlete	Event	Result	Rank	Result	Rank
Allan Kipyego (M); Mary Moraa (W); Mercy Oketch (W); Brian Tinega (M)	4 × 400 metres relay	DQ		Did not advance	
