= Uganda at the 2025 World Athletics Championships =

- Flag of Uganda
- WA code: UGA

in Tokyo, Japan 13 September 2025 – 21 September 2025
- Competitors: 21 (10 men and 11 women)
- Medals: Gold 0 Silver 0 Bronze 0 Total 0

World Athletics Championships appearances
- 1983; 1987; 1991; 1993; 1995; 1997; 1999; 2001; 2003; 2005; 2007; 2009; 2011; 2013; 2015; 2017; 2019; 2022; 2023; 2025

Uganda competed at the 2025 World Athletics Championships in Tokyo, Japan, from 13 to 21 September 2025.

== Results ==
Uganda entered 21 athletes to the championships: 11 women and 10 men.

Key

- Q = Qualified for the next round
- q = Qualified for the next round as a fastest loser or, in field events, by position without achieving the qualifying target
- NR = National record
- PB = Personal best
- SB = Season best
- N/A = Round not applicable for the event

=== Men ===
Track and road events

Athlete	Event	Heat		Semifinal		Final	
Athlete	Event	Result	Rank	Result	Rank	Result	Rank
Tom Dradriga	800 metres	1:46.18	6	Did not advance			
Harbert Kibet	5000 metres	13:52.36	18	—N/a		Did not advance	
Keneth Kiprop	5000 metres	13:25.15	13	—N/a		Did not advance	
Oscar Chelimo	10,000 metres	—N/a				29:26.66 PB	18
Dan Kibet	10,000 metres	—N/a				29:03.22	13
Abel Chelangat	Marathon	—N/a				2:10:11	5
Victor Kiplangat	Marathon	—N/a				2:11:33 SB	15
Stephen Kissa	Marathon	—N/a				DNF	
Solomon Mutai	Marathon	—N/a				DNF	
Leonard Chemutai	3000 metres steeplechase	8:33.24	9	—N/a		Did not advance	

=== Women ===
Track and road events

Athlete	Event	Heat		Semifinal		Final	
Athlete	Event	Result	Rank	Result	Rank	Result	Rank
Leni Shida	400 metres	51.61	5	Did not advance			
Halimah Nakaayi	800 metres	1:58.57	4 q	1:57.79	6	Did not advance	
Knight Aciru	1500 metres	4:09.79	11	Did not advance			
Joy Cheptoyek	5000 metres	14:51.17	8 Q	—N/a		15:18.98	16
Rebecca Chelangat	10,000 metres	—N/a				DNF	
Sarah Chelangat	10,000 metres	—N/a				DNF	
Joy Cheptoyek	10,000 metres	—N/a				31:15.03	7
Juliet Chekwel	Marathon	—N/a				DNF	
Mercyline Chelangat	Marathon	—N/a				2:45:36 SB	49
Stella Chesang	Marathon	—N/a				2:31:13	12
Loice Chekwemoi	3000 metres steeplechase	9:25.34 SB	8	—N/a		Did not advance	
Peruth Chemutai	3000 metres steeplechase	9:07.68	1 Q	—N/a		Did not finish	
