= 2025 World Athletics Championships – Men's marathon =

Men's marathon at the 2025 World Championships
- Venue: National Stadium
- Dates: 15 September
- Competitors: 90 from 47 nations
- Winning time: 2:09:48

Medalists
gold medal	Alphonce Simbu	Tanzania
silver medal	Amanal Petros	Germany
bronze medal	Iliass Aouani	Italy

The men's marathon at the 2025 World Athletics Championships was held at the National Stadium in Tokyo on 15 September 2025. This edition had the smallest margin of victory in World Championships marathon history, at only 0.03 seconds.

== Summary ==
Ethiopians Tadese Takele and Deresa Geleta, who had placed first and second, respectively, at the Tokyo Marathon in March, were among 22 athletes who dropped out of the race after hot temperatures made conditions difficult. Takele's time of 2:03:23 had placed him as the fastest entrant at the start.

With less than three kilometers remaining, Uganda's Abel Chelangat led four other athletes in a break from the rest of the field; however, Chelangat and Israel's Haimro Alame were dropped just before the stadium. Trailed closely by Alphonce Felix Simbu and Illiass Aouani, Amanal Petros held the lead as the podium trio ran through the tunnel and onto the track. Petros surged down the back stretch and appeared to drop his competitors, but just 30 meters from the finish line, Simbu launched a kick to reach the German. After a review of the photo-finish, Simbu was given the win over Petros by just 0.03 seconds, the smallest margin in World Championship history. Both were timed at 2:09:48, and Aouani took bronze in 2:09:53. Simbu's win gave Tanzania its first-ever global gold medal in athletics.

== Records ==
Before the competition records were as follows:

Record	Athlete & Nat.	Perf.	Location	Date
World record	Kelvin Kiptum (KEN)	2:00:35	Chicago, United States	8 October 2023
Championship record	Tamirat Tola (ETH)	2:05:36	Eugene, United States	17 July 2022
World Leading	Sabastian Sawe (KEN)	2:02:27	London, United Kingdom	27 April 2025
African Record	Kelvin Kiptum (KEN)	2:00:35	Chicago, United States	8 October 2023
Asian Record	El Hassan El Abbassi (BHR)	2:04:43	Valencia, Spain	2 December 2018
European Record	Bashir Abdi (BEL)	2:03:36	Rotterdam, Netherlands	24 October 2021
North, Central American and Caribbean record	Cameron Levins (CAN)	2:05:36	Tokyo, Japan	5 March 2023
Oceanian record	Andrew Buchanan (AUS)	2:06:22	Valencia, Spain	1 December 2024
South American Record	Daniel Ferreira do Nascimento (BRA)	2:04:51	Seoul, South Korea	17 April 2022

== Qualification Standard ==
The standard to qualify automatically for entry was 2:06:30.

== Schedule ==
The event schedule, in local time (UTC+9), was as follows:

Date	Time	Round
15 September	07:30	Final

== Results ==
The race was started on 15 September at 7:30.

Place	Athlete	Nation	Time	Notes
1st place, gold medalist(s)	Alphonce Simbu	Tanzania	2:09:48	SB
2nd place, silver medalist(s)	Amanal Petros	Germany	2:09:48	
3rd place, bronze medalist(s)	Iliass Aouani	Italy	2:09:53	
4	Haimro Alame	Israel	2:10:03	
5	Abel Chelangat	Uganda	2:10:11	
6	Yohanes Chiappinelli	Italy	2:10:15	SB
7	Gashau Ayale	Israel	2:10:27	
8	Samsom Amare	Eritrea	2:10:34	
9	Clayton Young	United States	2:10:43	SB
10	Isaac Mpofu	Zimbabwe	2:10:46	SB
11	Ryota Kondo	Japan	2:10:53	
12	Cameron Levins	Canada	2:11:07	SB
13	Richard Ringer	Germany	2:11:14	
14	Suldan Hassan	Sweden	2:11:18	
15	Victor Kiplangat	Uganda	2:11:33	SB
16	Kennedy Kimutai	Kenya	2:11:45	
17	Koen Naert	Belgium	2:12:52	
18	Abderrazak Charik	Algeria	2:13:06	SB
19	Kaan Kigen Özbilen	Turkey	2:13:27	
20	Mohamed Reda El Aaraby	Morocco	2:13:29	
21	Yaseen Abdalla	Sudan	2:13:32	SB
22	Vincent Kipkemoi	Kenya	2:13:38	
23	Naoki Koyama	Japan	2:13:42	
24	Peter Lynch	Ireland	2:14:12	
25	Ebba Tulu Chala	Sweden	2:14:40	
26	He Jie	China	2:14:52	
27	Oqbe Kibrom Ruesom	Eritrea	2:15:01	
28	Reed Fischer	United States	2:15:17	SB
29	Jacob Simonsen	Denmark	2:15:31	SB
30	Yang Shaohui	China	2:15:35	
31	Wu Xiangdong	China	2:16:01	
32	Cristhian Zamora	Uruguay	2:16:09	SB
33	Elroy Gelant	South Africa	2:16:32	
34	Yuya Yoshida	Japan	2:16:58	SB
35	Justin Kent	Canada	2:17:12	
36	Ben Preisner	Canada	2:17:32	
37	Shokhrukh Davlatov	Uzbekistan	2:18:04	SB
38	Johnatas de Oliveira	Brazil	2:18:22	
39	Kiruhura Emmanuel Ntagunga	Athlete Refugee Team	2:19:11	
40	CJ Albertson	United States	2:19:25	
41	Omar Hassan	Athlete Refugee Team	2:19:47	
42	Rui Pinto	Portugal	2:19:50	
43	Tom Hendrikse	Netherlands	2:19:57	SB
44	Tim Vincent	Australia	2:20:12	SB
45	Paulo Roberto Paula	Brazil	2:20:18	
46	Ablelom Maryo	Eritrea	2:20:46	
47	Mohammed Benyettou	Algeria	2:20:51	SB
48	Marcelo Laguera	Mexico	2:20:56	
49	Sondre Nordstad Moen	Norway	2:21:22	
50	Mateusz Kaczor	Poland	2:21:51	SB
51	Tiidrek Nurme	Estonia	2:21:58	
52	Aaron Gruen	Austria	2:22:07	
53	Josephat Joshua Gisemo	Tanzania	2:22:47	SB
54	Hugo Catrileo	Chile	2:23:29	
55	İlham Tanui Özbilen	Turkey	2:23:35	
56	Ferdinand Cereceda	Peru	2:23:46	SB
57	Liam Boudin	Australia	2:24:39	
58	Dario Ivanovski	North Macedonia	2:26:31	
59	Samuel Freire	Cape Verde	2:27:26	SB
60	Segundo Jami	Ecuador	2:28:07	
61	Tendai Zimuto	Zimbabwe	2:28:10	
62	Nicolás Cuestas	Uruguay	2:28:37	
63	Ederson Pereira	Brazil	2:28:40	
64	Leonid Latsepov	Estonia	2:29:59	
65	Bat-Ochiryn Ser-Od	Mongolia	2:30:09	
66	Maxim Răileanu	Moldova	2:32:15	
	Sezgin Ataç	Turkey	DNF	
	Therence Bizoza	Burundi	DNF	
	Soufiyan Bouqantar	Morocco	DNF	
	Emile Cairess	Great Britain & N.I.	DNF	
	Rene Champi	Peru	DNF	
	Yemaneberhan Crippa	Italy	DNF	
	Tesfaye Deriba	Ethiopia	DNF	
	Othmane El Goumri	Morocco	DNF	
	Deresa Geleta	Ethiopia	DNF	
	Hiko Tonosa Haso	Ireland	DNF	
	Hillary Kipkoech	Kenya	DNF	
	Stephen Kissa	Uganda	DNF	
	Zerei Kbrom Mezngi	Norway	DNF	
	Solomon Mutai	Uganda	DNF	
	Yves Nimubona	Rwanda	DNF	
	Juan Pacheco	Mexico	DNF	
	Park Min-ho	South Korea	DNF	
	Daniel Nghidinwa Paulus	Namibia	DNF	
	Tadese Takele	Ethiopia	DNF	
	Maru Teferi	Israel	DNF	
	Tseveenravdangiin Byambajav	Mongolia	DNF	
	Abdi Waiss Mouhyadin	Djibouti	DNF	
	Ibrahim Hassan	Djibouti	DNS	
	Félicien Muhitira	Rwanda	DNS	
