= Eritrea at the 2025 World Athletics Championships =

- Flag of Eritrea
- WA code: ERI

in Tokyo, Japan 13 September 2025 – 21 September 2025
- Competitors: 10 (8 men and 2 women)
- Medals: Gold 0 Silver 0 Bronze 0 Total 0

World Athletics Championships appearances
- 1997; 1999; 2001; 2003; 2005; 2007; 2009; 2011; 2013; 2015; 2017; 2019; 2022; 2023; 2025

Eritrea competed at the 2025 World Athletics Championships in Tokyo, Japan, from 13 to 21 September 2025.

== Results ==
Eritrea entered 7 athletes to the championships: 6 men and 1 woman..

Key

- Q = Qualified for the next round
- q = Qualified for the next round as a fastest loser or, in field events, by position without achieving the qualifying target
- NR = National record
- PB = Personal best
- SB = Season best
- N/A = Round not applicable for the event

=== Men ===
Track and road events

Athlete	Event	Heat		Final	
Athlete	Event	Result	Rank	Result	Rank
Saymon Amanuel	5000 metres	13:49.43	15	Did not advance	
Merhawi Mebrahtu	10,000 metres	—N/a		Did not start	
Samsom Amare	Marathon	—N/a		2:10:34	8
Ablelom Maryo	Marathon	—N/a		2:20:46	46
Oqbe Kibrom Ruesom	Marathon	—N/a		2:15:01	27

=== Women ===
Track and road events

Athlete	Event	Final	
Athlete	Event	Result	Rank
Dolshi Tesfu	Marathon	2:30:41	10
