= 2025 World Athletics Championships – Men's 5000 metres =

Men's 5000 metres at the 2025 World Athletics Championships
- Venue: National Stadium
- Location: Tokyo, Japan
- Dates: 19 September (heats); 21 September (final)
- Winning time: 12:58.30

Medalists
gold medal	Cole Hocker	United States
silver medal	Isaac Kimeli	Belgium
bronze medal	Jimmy Gressier	France

The men's 5000 metres at the 2025 World Athletics Championships was held at the National Stadium in Tokyo on 19 and 21 September 2025.

== Records ==
Before the competition records were as follows:

Record	Athlete & Nat.	Perf.	Location	Date
World record	Joshua Cheptegei (UGA)	12:35.36	Fontvieille, Monaco	14 August 2020
Championship record	Eliud Kipchoge (KEN)	12:52.79	Saint-Denis, France	31 August 2003
World Leading	Andreas Almgren (SWE)	12:44.27	Sweden, Stockholm	15 June 2025
African Record	Joshua Cheptegei (UGA)	12:35.36	Fontvieille, Monaco	14 August 2020
Asian Record	Birhanu Balew (BHR)	12:48.67	Paris, France	20 June 2025
European Record	Andreas Almgren (SWE)	12:44.27	Stockholm, Sweden	15 June 2025
North, Central American and Caribbean record	Nico Young (USA)	12:45.27	Oslo, Norway	12 June 2025
Oceanian record	Craig Mottram (AUS)	12:55.76	London, United Kingdom	30 July 2004
South American Record	Santiago Catrofe (URU)	12:59.26	Paris, France	20 June 2025

== Qualification standard ==
The standard to qualify automatically for entry was 13:01.00.

== Schedule ==
The event schedule, in local time (UTC+9), is as follows:

Date	Time	Round
19 September	20:00	Heats
21 September	19:47	Final

== Results ==
=== Heats ===
The heats took place on 19 September. The first eight athletes in each heat ( Q ) qualified for the final.

==== Heat 1 ====
Place	Athlete	Nation	Time	Notes
1	Isaac Kimeli	Belgium	13:13.06	Q
2	Mathew Kipsang	Kenya	13:13.33	Q
3	Cole Hocker	United States	13:13.41	Q
4	Nico Young	United States	13:13.51	Q
5	Ky Robinson	Australia	13:13.60	Q
6	Hagos Gebrhiwet	Ethiopia	13:13.73	Q
7	Mike Foppen	Netherlands	13:13.97	Q
8	Etienne Daguinos	France	13:14.87	Q
9	Andreas Almgren	Sweden	13:16.38	
10	Santiago Catrofe	Uruguay	13:17.26	
11	Dominic Lobalu	Switzerland	13:19.57	
12	Narve Gilje Nordås	Norway	13:25.00	
13	Keneth Kiprop	Uganda	13:25.15	
14	Jacob Krop	Kenya	13:28.73	
15	Nagiya Mori	Japan	13:29.44	
16	Florian Bremm	Germany	13:31.09	
17	Brian Fay	Ireland	13:31.12	
18	Seth O'Donnell	Australia	13:34.52	
19	Zhusup Sulaiman Uulu	Kyrgyzstan	14:47.40	
	Kuma Girma	Ethiopia	DNF	
	Soufiane El Bakkali	Morocco	DNS	

==== Heat 2 ====
Place	Athlete	Nation	Time	Notes
1	Biniam Mehary	Ethiopia	13:41.52	Q
2	Jimmy Gressier	France	13:41.64	Q
3	Birhanu Balew	Bahrain	13:41.75	Q
4	George Mills	Great Britain & N.I.	13:41.76	Q
5	Valentín Soca	Uruguay	13:41.80	Q
6	Grant Fisher	United States	13:41.83	Q
7	Yann Schrub	France	13:42.00	Q
8	Jakob Ingebrigtsen	Norway	13:42.15	Q, SB
9	Gulveer Singh	India	13:42.34	
10	Darragh McElhinney	Ireland	13:42.56	
11	Mohamed Abdilaahi	Germany	13:44.68	
12	Cornelius Kemboi	Kenya	13:45.79	
13	John Heymans	Belgium	13:47.37	
14	Thierry Ndikumwenayo	Spain	13:47.72	
15	Saymon Amanuel	Eritrea	13:49.43	
16	Jack Rayner	Australia	13:49.46	
17	Eduardo Herrera	Mexico	13:51.29	
18	Harbert Kibet	Uganda	13:52.36	
19	Andrew Coscoran	Ireland	13:56.95	
20	Jamal Abdelmaji	Athlete Refugee Team	13:58.90	
	Niels Laros	Netherlands	DNF	
	Luis Grijalva	Guatemala	DNS	

=== Final ===
Place	Athlete	Nation	Time	Notes
1st place, gold medalist(s)	Cole Hocker	United States	12:58.30	
2nd place, silver medalist(s)	Isaac Kimeli	Belgium	12:58.78	SB
3rd place, bronze medalist(s)	Jimmy Gressier	France	12:59.33	
4	Ky Robinson	Australia	12:59.61	
5	Biniam Mehary	Ethiopia	12:59.95	
6	Nico Young	United States	13:00.07	
7	Birhanu Balew	Bahrain	13:00.55	
8	Grant Fisher	United States	13:00.79	
9	Yann Schrub	France	13:01.34	
10	Jakob Ingebrigtsen	Norway	13:02.00	SB
11	Mathew Kipsang	Kenya	13:03.67	
12	Mike Foppen	Netherlands	13:05.94	
13	Hagos Gebrhiwet	Ethiopia	13:07.02	
14	Etienne Daguinos	France	13:11.72	
15	Valentín Soca	Uruguay	13:34.35	
16	George Mills	Great Britain & N.I.	13:44.88	
