= 2025 World Athletics Championships – Women's marathon =

Women's marathon at the 2025 World Athletics Championships
- Venue: National Stadium
- Location: Tokyo, Japan
- Dates: 14 September
- Competitors: 73 from 42 nations
- Winning time: 2:24:43

Medalists
gold medal	Peres Jepchirchir	Kenya
silver medal	Tigst Assefa	Ethiopia
bronze medal	Julia Paternain	Uruguay

The women's marathon at the 2025 World Athletics Championships was held at the National Stadium in Tokyo on 14 September 2025.

== Records ==
Before the competition records were as follows:

Record	Athlete & Nat.	Perf.	Location	Date
World Record	Ruth Chepng'etich (KEN)	2:09:56	Chicago, United States	13 October 2024
Championship record	Gotytom Gebreslase (ETH)	2:18:11	Eugene, United States	18 July 2022
World Leading	Tigst Assefa (ETH)	2:15:50	London, United Kingdom	27 April 2025
African Record	Ruth Chepng'etich (KEN)	2:09:56	Chicago, United States	13 October 2024
Asian Record	Honami Maeda (JPN)	2:18:59	Osaka, Japan	28 January 2024
European Record	Sifan Hassan (NED)	2:13:44	Chicago, United States	8 October 2023
North, Central American and Caribbean record	Emily Sisson (USA)	2:18:29	Chicago, United States	9 October 2022
Oceanian record	Sinead Diver (AUS)	2:21:34	Valencia, Spain	4 December 2022
South American Record	Florencia Borelli (ARG)	2:24:18	Seville, Spain	18 February 2022

== Qualification standard ==
The standard to qualify automatically for entry was 2:23:30. Three athletes per country, maximum, plus any wild card.

== Schedule ==
The event schedule, in local time (UTC+9), was as follows:

Date	Time	Round
14 September	07:30	Final

== Results ==
The race was started on 14 September at 7:30.

Place	Athlete	Nation	Time	Notes
1st place, gold medalist(s)	Peres Jepchirchir	Kenya	2:24:43	SB
2nd place, silver medalist(s)	Tigst Assefa	Ethiopia	2:24:45	
3rd place, bronze medalist(s)	Julia Paternain	Uruguay	2:27:23	
4	Susanna Sullivan	United States	2:28:17	SB
5	Alisa Vainio	Finland	2:28:32	SB
6	Shitaye Eshete	Bahrain	2:28:41	
7	Kana Kobayashi	Japan	2:28:50	
8	Jessica McClain	United States	2:29:20	SB
9	Fionnuala McCormack	Ireland	2:30:16	SB
10	Dolshi Tesfu	Eritrea	2:30:41	
11	Laura Luengo	Spain	2:30:55	SB
12	Stella Chesang	Uganda	2:31:13	
13	Sayaka Sato	Japan	2:31:15	
14	Ciren Cuomu	China	2:31:38	
15	Nóra Szabó	Hungary	2:31:41	
16	Eunice Chumba	Bahrain	2:32:22	
17	Anne Luijten	Netherlands	2:32:27	
18	Jackline Cherono	Kenya	2:33:17	
19	Solange Jesus	Portugal	2:33:24	
20	Rebecca Lonedo	Italy	2:33:40	
21	Sheyla Eulogio	Peru	2:33:42	
22	Li Zhixuan	China	2:34:03	
23	Maor Tiyouri	Israel	2:34:28	
24	Fatima Ouhaddou	Spain	2:35:05	
25	Galbadrakhyn Khishigsaikhan	Mongolia	2:35:05	
26	Susana Santos	Portugal	2:35:06	SB
27	Sutume Kebede	Ethiopia	2:35:30	
28	Yuka Ando	Japan	2:35:37	
29	Choi Kyung-sun	South Korea	2:35:42	
30	Zhang Deshun	China	2:35:58	
31	Natasha Wodak	Canada	2:36:02	SB
32	Manon Trapp	France	2:36:09	
33	Julia Mayer	Austria	2:36:20	SB
34	Alina Armas	Namibia	2:36:33	
35	Silvia Ortiz	Ecuador	2:37:22	SB
36	Atalena Loliha	South Sudan	2:38:18	
37	Lim Ye-jin	South Korea	2:38:31	
38	Vanessa Wilson	Australia	2:39:17	SB
39	Aleksandra Brzezińska	Poland	2:39:46	
40	Marcella Herzog	Netherlands	2:39:57	SB
41	Neheng Khatala	Lesotho	2:41:16	SB
42	Sarah Klein	Australia	2:41:46	SB
43	Sara Schou Kristensen	Denmark	2:42:34	SB
44	Nina Usubyan	Armenia	2:42:37	
45	Bayartsogtyn Mönkhzayaa	Mongolia	2:42:43	SB
46	Mary Zenaida Granja	Ecuador	2:43:02	
47	Isabel Oropeza	Mexico	2:43:53	SB
48	Tara Palm	Australia	2:44:51	
49	Chiara Milena Mainetti	Argentina	2:46:27	
50	Aydee Loayza	Peru	2:48:00	
51	Erika Kemp	United States	2:50:35	
52	Fortunate Chidzivo	Zimbabwe	2:51:24	
53	Rahma Tahiri	Morocco	2:51:30	
54	Diana Bogantes	Costa Rica	2:54:02	SB
55	Hanne Andersen Maridal	Norway	2:55:04	SB
56	Karen Ehrenreich	Denmark	2:57:07	
57	Clementine Mukandanga	Rwanda	2:58:00	SB
58	Nicole Urra	Chile	2:58:05	
59	Magaly García	Venezuela	2:58:51	
60	Anja Fink	Slovenia	2:59:31	SB
61	Adrijana Pop Arsova Rashikj	North Macedonia	3:01:48	SB
62	Margarita Hernández	Mexico	3:02:26	
	Juliet Chekwel	Uganda	DNF	
	Kaoutar Farkoussi	Morocco	DNF	
	Fatima Ezzahra Gardadi	Morocco	DNF	
	Tigist Gashaw	Bahrain	DNF	
	Tigist Ketema	Ethiopia	DNF	
	Magdalyne Masai	Kenya	DNF	
	Izabela Paszkiewicz	Poland	DNF	
	Zaida Ramos	Peru	DNF	
	Lonah Chemtai Salpeter	Israel	DNF	
	Moira Stewartová	Czech Republic	DNF	
	Mercyline Chelangat	Uganda	~~2:45:36~~	DQ
