= Ethiopia at the 2025 World Athletics Championships =

- Flag of Ethiopia
- WA code: ETH

in Tokyo, Japan 13 September 2025 – 21 September 2025
- Competitors: 36 (16 men and 20 women)
- Medals Ranked 22nd: Gold 0 Silver 2 Bronze 2 Total 4

World Athletics Championships appearances
- 1983; 1987; 1991; 1993; 1995; 1997; 1999; 2001; 2003; 2005; 2007; 2009; 2011; 2013; 2015; 2017; 2019; 2022; 2023; 2025

Ethiopia competed at the 2025 World Athletics Championships in Tokyo, Japan, from 13 to 21 September 2025.

== Medallists ==
Medal	Athlete	Event	Date
Silver	Tigst Assefa	Women's marathon	14 September
Silver	Yomif Kejelcha	Men's 10,000 metres	14 September
Bronze	Gudaf Tsegay	Women's 10,000 metres	13 September
Bronze	Sembo Almayew	Women's 3000 metres steeplechase	17 September

== Results ==
Ethiopia entered 36 athletes to the championships: 16 men and 20 women..

Key

- Q = Qualified for the next round
- q = Qualified for the next round as a fastest loser or, in field events, by position without achieving the qualifying target
- NR = National record
- PB = Personal best
- SB = Season best
- N/A = Round not applicable for the event

=== Men ===
Track and road events

Athlete	Event	Heat		Semifinal		Final	
Athlete	Event	Result	Rank	Result	Rank	Result	Rank
Yohannes Tefera	800 metres	1:50.93	8	Did not advance			
Ermias Girma	1500 metres	3:46.62	14	Did not advance			
Melese Nberet	1500 metres	3:41.54	11	Did not advance			
Hagos Gebrhiwet	5000 metres	13:13.73	6 Q	—N/a		13:07.02	13
Kuma Girma	5000 metres	Did not finish		—N/a		Did not advance	
Biniam Mehary	5000 metres	13:41.52	1 Q	—N/a		12:59.95	5
Berihu Aregawi	10,000 metres	—N/a				29:02.02	12
Selemon Barega	10,000 metres	—N/a				28:57.21	6
Yomif Kejelcha	10,000 metres	—N/a				28:55.83 SB	2nd place, silver medalist(s)
Tesfaye Deriba	Marathon	—N/a				DNF	
Deresa Geleta	Marathon	—N/a				DNF	
Tadese Takele	Marathon	—N/a				DNF	
Samuel Firewu	3000 metres steeplechase	8:27.54	3 Q	—N/a		8:34.68	4
Lamecha Girma	3000 metres steeplechase	8:27.79	2 Q	—N/a		8:35.60	6
Getnet Wale	3000 metres steeplechase	8:30.14	2 Q	—N/a		8:41.23	14
Misgana Wakuma	20 kilometres walk	—N/a				1:21:17 SB	18

=== Women ===
Track and road events

Athlete	Event	Heat		Semifinal		Final	
Athlete	Event	Result	Rank	Result	Rank	Result	Rank
Tsige Duguma	800 metres	2:01.53	1 Q	1:57.70	5	Did not advance	
Nigist Getachew	800 metres	2:02.42	8	Did not advance			
Worknesh Mesele	800 metres	1:58.46	3 Q	2:00.91	9	Did not advance	
Saron Berhe	1500 metres	4:07.06	9	Did not advance			
Freweyni Hailu	1500 metres	4:01.23	1 Q	4:01.03	3 Q	3:57.33	6
Fantaye Belayneh	5000 metres	14:47.46	6 Q	—N/a		15:02.05	9
Medina Eisa	5000 metres	14:57.03	5 Q	—N/a		15:07.47	13
Birke Haylom	5000 metres	14:53.49	9	—N/a		Did not advance	
Gudaf Tsegay	5000 metres	14:56.46	1 Q	—N/a		14:57.82	5
Tsigie Gebreselama	10,000 metres	—N/a				32:33.73 SB	21
Ejgayehu Taye	10,000 metres	—N/a				30:55.52 SB	5
Fotyen Tesfay	10,000 metres	—N/a				31:21.67 SB	8
Gudaf Tsegay	10,000 metres	—N/a				30:39.65 SB	3rd place, bronze medalist(s)
Tigst Assefa	Marathon	—N/a				2:24:45	2nd place, silver medalist(s)
Sutume Asefa Kebede	Marathon	—N/a				2:35:30	27
Tigist Ketema	Marathon	—N/a				Did not finish	
Sembo Almayew	3000 metres steeplechase	9:15.84	3 Q	—N/a		8:58.86 PB	3rd place, bronze medalist(s)
Lomi Muleta	3000 metres steeplechase	9:12.20 SB	3 Q	—N/a		9:14.90	8
Alemnat Walle	3000 metres steeplechase	Did not finish		—N/a		Did not advance	
Sintayehu Masire	20 kilometres walk	—N/a				Did not finish	
