= 2025 World Athletics Championships – Women's 400 metres =

Women's 400 metres at the 2025 World Athletics Championships
- Venue: National Stadium
- Location: Tokyo, Japan
- Dates: 14 September (heats); 16 September (semi-finals); 18 September (final)
- Winning time: 47.78 CR, AR, WL

Medalists
gold medal	Sydney McLaughlin-Levrone	United States
silver medal	Marileidy Paulino	Dominican Republic
bronze medal	Salwa Eid Naser	Bahrain

The women's 400 metres at the 2025 World Athletics Championships was held at the National Stadium in Tokyo on 14, 16 and 18 September 2025.

== Summary ==
The fact that Olympic champion Marileidy Paulino #4 in history is the returning champion is only a small part of the story in this event. 2019 World champion Salwa Eid Naser #3 in history is world leader and she is younger than Paulino. Additionally, Sydney McLaughlin-Levrone #12 in history is also a previous world champion, in the 400 metres hurdles, where she has set the world record 6 times. After toying with the race without hurdles for a couple of years, she is concentrating on this event for the first time. Almost forgotten, Nickisha Pryce is #8 in history.

The championship record is 42 years old, the former world record and #2 in history. The world record is almost exactly 40 years old, a race that included two others performances that remain in the top ten in history. Decades later, there are still accusations of the chemical enhancements that might have aided these historical performances.

Naser had the fastest time in the heats. At 49.17 it might have been excessive as it would almost be one of the top 25 in history. The semis were all about excessive for McLaughlin-Levrone, 48.29 was the American record and #7 in history. Two time bronze medalist Sada Williams and a 49.88 by Martina Weil did not get out of the semis.

The finals put Paulino in lane 9, the far outside. Naser got 7, McLaughlin-Levrone in 5. With the track still wet from earlier rain, the weather was less oppressive than it had been for other events. Down the backstretch, it was clear the three had already separated from the rest of the field. Using the painted marks, McLaughlin-Levrone had a slight edge over Paulino then Nasser. The positioning held through the turn and when they hit the straightaway, McLaughlin-Levrone only had a metre on the fast closing Paulino who only had another metre on Naser. Both McLaughlin-Levrone and Naser running disciplined form hard to the finish, Paulino twisting, over-striding and gaining slightly on McLaughlin-Levrone until giving up the fight the last few steps when it was clear it wouldn't be enough.

McLaughlin-Levrone's 47.78 in first broke that impossible Championship record, the North American record Paulino had set at the Olympics and her own American record from two days earlier. It was the number two time in history, only .18 off that world record. Paulino 47.98 was the new number 3 time in history. And Nasser 48.17 in third just .03 off her personal best from 6 years earlier, which was the #3 all time at the start of the race.

== Records ==
Before the competition records were as follows:

Record	Athlete & Nat.	Perf.	Location	Date
World record	Marita Koch (GDR)	47.60	Canberra, Australia	6 October 1985
Championship record	Jarmila Kratochvílová (TCH)	47.99	Helsinki, Finland	10 August 1983
World Leading	Salwa Eid Naser (BHR)	48.67	Kingston, Jamaica	5 April 2025
African Record	Falilat Ogunkoya (NGR)	49.10	Atlanta, United States	29 July 1996
Asian Record	Salwa Eid Naser (BHR)	48.14	Doha, Qatar	3 October 2019
European Record	Marita Koch (GDR)	47.60	Canberra, Australia	6 October 1985
North, Central American and Caribbean record	Marileidy Paulino (DOM)	48.17	Paris, France	9 August 2024
Oceanian record	Cathy Freeman (AUS)	48.63	Atlanta, United States	29 July 1996
South American Record	Ximena Restrepo (COL)	49.64	Barcelona, Spain	5 August 1992

The following records were set at the competition:

Record	Athlete & Nat.	Perf.	Date
Championship record	Sydney McLaughlin-Levrone (USA)	47.78	18 September 2025
World Leading	Sydney McLaughlin-Levrone (USA)	47.78	18 September 2025
North, Central American and Caribbean record	Sydney McLaughlin-Levrone (USA)	47.78	18 September 2025

== Qualification standard ==
The standard to qualify automatically for entry was 50.75.

== Schedule ==
The event schedule, in local time (UTC+9), was as follows:

Date	Time	Round
14 September	19:25	Heats
16 September	21:07	Semi-finals
18 September	22:24	Final

== Results ==
=== Heats ===
The heats took place on 14 September. The first three athletes in each heat ( Q ) and the six fastest ( q ) qualified for the semi-finals.

==== Heat 1 ====
Place	Lane	Athlete	Nation	Time	Notes
1	5	Lieke Klaver	Netherlands	50.32	Q
2	8	Isabella Whittaker	United States	50.82	Q
3	6	Dejanea Oakley	Jamaica	51.07	Q
4	4	Lauren Gale	Canada	51.56	
5	9	Alice Mangione	Italy	51.70	
6	2	Mette Baas	Finland	51.92	
7	7	Vimbayi Maisvorewa	Zimbabwe	52.28	
8	3	Ellie Beer	Australia	52.31	

==== Heat 2 ====
Place	Lane	Athlete	Nation	Time	Notes
1	8	Wadeline Venlogh	Haiti	49.91	Q, NR
2	5	Natalia Bukowiecka	Poland	50.16	Q
3	6	Aaliyah Butler	United States	50.44	Q
4	7	Sada Williams	Barbados	50.93	q
5	4	Leni Shida	Uganda	51.61	
6	2	Zoe Sherar	Canada	52.19	
7	3	Myrte van der Schoot	Netherlands	52.19	
8	9	Miranda Coetzee	South Africa	57.78	

==== Heat 3 ====
Place	Lane	Athlete	Nation	Time	Notes
1	6	Sydney McLaughlin-Levrone	United States	49.41	Q
2	7	Martina Weil	Chile	50.61	Q
3	8	Mercy Oketch	Kenya	50.76	Q
4	9	Sharlene Mawdsley	Ireland	51.04	q
5	4	Caitlyn Bobb	Bermuda	51.72	
6	3	Eveline Saalberg	Netherlands	51.73	
7	5	Javonya Valcourt	Bahamas	52.00	
8	2	Tiffani Marinho	Brazil	53.34	
9	1	Esther Mayadjim Mingueyam	Chad	56.35	PB

==== Heat 4 ====
Place	Lane	Athlete	Nation	Time	Notes
1	6	Nickisha Pryce	Jamaica	49.91	Q
2	7	Henriette Jæger	Norway	50.12	Q
3	5	Roxana Gómez	Cuba	50.35	Q, SB
4	9	Printassia Johnson	Bahamas	50.53	q, PB
5	8	Yemi Mary John	Great Britain & N.I.	50.71	q
6	2	Lada Vondrová	Czech Republic	51.90	
7	3	Dianna Proctor	Canada	51.98	
8	4	Gabby Scott	Puerto Rico	52.55	

==== Heat 5 ====
Place	Lane	Athlete	Nation	Time	Notes
1	5	Salwa Eid Naser	Bahrain	49.13	Q
2	7	Stacey-Ann Williams	Jamaica	49.59	Q, PB
3	4	Andrea Miklós	Romania	50.96	Q, SB
4	9	Victoria Ohuruogu	Great Britain & N.I.	51.37	q
5	6	Anna Polinari	Italy	51.55	
6	3	Shirley Nekhubui	South Africa	51.82	
7	1	Nanako Matsumoto	Japan	52.41	
8	2	Nadeesha Ramanayake	Sri Lanka	53.63	
9	8	Evelis Aguilar	Colombia	53.82	

==== Heat 6 ====
Place	Lane	Athlete	Nation	Time	Notes
1	6	Marileidy Paulino	Dominican Republic	49.85	Q
2	5	Amber Anning	Great Britain & N.I.	49.96	Q
3	8	Bassant Hemida	Egypt	50.36	Q, NR
4	7	Paula Sevilla	Spain	50.69	q, PB
5	3	Justyna Święty-Ersetic	Poland	51.80	
6	2	Sophie Becker	Ireland	52.19	
7	9	Veronika Drljačić	Croatia	52.67	
8	4	Susanne Gogl-Walli	Austria	52.92	
9	1	Samira Awali Boubacar	Niger	52.99	SB

=== Semi-finals ===
The heats took place on 16 September. The first two athletes in each heat ( Q ) and the two fastest ( q ) qualified for the final.

==== Heat 1 ====
Place	Lane	Athlete	Nation	Time	Notes
1	5	Natalia Bukowiecka	Poland	49.67	Q, SB
2	6	Marileidy Paulino	Dominican Republic	49.82	Q
3	7	Henriette Jæger	Norway	49.87	q
4	3	Sada Williams	Barbados	50.39	SB
5	4	Aaliyah Butler	United States	50.63	
6	8	Wadeline Venlogh	Haiti	50.67	
7	9	Dejanea Oakley	Jamaica	51.42	
8	2	Yemi Mary John	Great Britain & N.I.	51.51	

==== Heat 2 ====
Place	Lane	Athlete	Nation	Time	Notes
1	5	Salwa Eid Naser	Bahrain	49.47	Q
2	9	Roxana Gómez	Cuba	49.78	Q, SB
3	6	Isabella Whittaker	United States	50.20	
4	8	Lieke Klaver	Netherlands	50.25	
5	7	Stacey-Ann Williams	Jamaica	50.39	
6	3	Printassia Johnson	Bahamas	50.81	
7	4	Mercy Oketch	Kenya	51.36	
8	2	Victoria Ohuruogu	Great Britain & N.I.	51.65	

==== Heat 3 ====
Place	Lane	Athlete	Nation	Time	Notes
1	8	Sydney McLaughlin-Levrone	United States	48.29	Q, NR, WL
2	6	Amber Anning	Great Britain & N.I.	49.38	Q, SB
3	7	Nickisha Pryce	Jamaica	49.46	q, SB
4	5	Martina Weil	Chile	49.88	
5	9	Bassant Hemida	Egypt	50.69	
6	4	Andrea Miklós	Romania	50.90	SB
7	2	Paula Sevilla	Spain	50.97	
8	3	Sharlene Mawdsley	Ireland	51.22	

=== Final ===
Place	Lane	Athlete	Nation	Time	Notes
1st place, gold medalist(s)	5	Sydney McLaughlin-Levrone	United States	47.78	CR, AR, WL
2nd place, silver medalist(s)	9	Marileidy Paulino	Dominican Republic	47.98	NR
3rd place, bronze medalist(s)	7	Salwa Eid Naser	Bahrain	48.19	SB
4	8	Natalia Bukowiecka	Poland	49.27	SB
5	6	Amber Anning	Great Britain & N.I.	49.36	SB
6	4	Roxana Gómez	Cuba	49.48	NR
7	3	Henriette Jæger	Norway	49.74	
8	2	Nickisha Pryce	Jamaica	49.97	
