= 2025 World Athletics Championships – Men's 1500 metres =

Men's 1500 metres at the 2025 World Athletics Championships
- Venue: National Stadium
- Location: Tokyo, Japan
- Dates: 14 September (heats); 15 September (semi-finals); 17 September (final)
- Winning time: 3:34.10

Medalists
gold medal	Isaac Nader	Portugal
silver medal	Jake Wightman	Great Britain
bronze medal	Reynold Cheruiyot	Kenya

The men's 1500 metres at the 2025 World Athletics Championships was held at the National Stadium in Tokyo on 14, 15 and 17 September 2025. Isaac Nader of Portugal won the event in 3:34.10, followed by Jake Wightman of Britain and Reynold Cheruiyot of Kenya. Several publications noted the unpredictability of the final, with many big names failing to advance, as well as Nader's surprise victory.

== Summary ==
Competitors in the event included defending champion Josh Kerr, 2022 champion Jake Wightman, and 2019 champion Timothy Cheruiyot, as well as 2020 Olympic champion Jakob Ingebrigtsen and 2024 Olympic champion Cole Hocker. Entering the event, Azeddine Habz of France held a world leading time of 3:27.49.

Qualification for the semi-finals and final was based on place only, with the first six finishers in each heat or semi-final qualifying for the next round. Neither Ingrebrigtsen, who had dealt with an Achilles tendon injury earlier in the season, nor Habz advanced to the semi-finals. In both semi-finals, the time of the sixth-place finisher was within 0.3 seconds of the winning time. 2023 bronze medalist Narve Gilje Nordås missed qualifying for the final by 0.01 seconds, as did Raphael Pallitsch. Hocker was disqualified after making contact with Robert Farken in the home stretch of his semi-final. Farken and Federico Riva were subsequently advanced to the final by the referee and the Jury of Appeals, respectively.

=== Final ===
Coming off the start line, a wall of about 6 competitors looked at each other trying to decide who would be relegated to lead. Laros became the nominee. Kerr notably made a beeline to the inner lane near the back of the pack. With his training partner on the front, Timothy went from the back of the pack to the front to form a wall that would last the first 650 metres when Timothy took his turn to lead the next lap. 950 metres into the race while being passed by Farken, Kerr jumped up and winced, even taking one step inside the curb. He started running awkwardly. The defending champion was out of the running.

As they approached the bell, the pack tightened up to 4 wide behind Cheruiyot and Laros. Finally on the backstretch, Wightman sprinted around the wall into the lead. With Wightman ahead, no other competitor got past the wall until the halfway up the home stretch, when Reynold edged ahead. Sprinting from fifth place, Isaac Nader went past all of them, catching Wightman 2 metres before the finish line. Reacting to the surprise challenge, Wightman made a desperate dip for the line, later falling to the track, tripping Reynold in the process. Nader looked up at the scoreboard confused until seeing the confirmation that he had won. Nader's winning time was around five seconds slower than the two previous runnings of the event at global championships. Writing for Reuters, Mitch Phillips described Nader as a "shock winner". The determined defending champion, Kerr still managed to finish in 4:11, fighting through the injury.

== Records ==
Before the competition records were as follows:

Record	Athlete & Nat.	Perf.	Location	Date
World record	Hicham El Guerrouj (MAR)	3:26.00	Rome, Italy	14 July 1998
Championship record	Hicham El Guerrouj (MAR)	3:27.65	Seville, Spain	24 August 1999
World Leading	Azeddine Habz (FRA)	3:27.49	Paris, France	20 June 2025
African Record	Hicham El Guerrouj (MAR)	3:26.00	Rome, Italy	14 July 1998
Asian Record	Rashid Ramzi (BHR)	3:29.14	Rome, Italy	14 July 2006
European Record	Jakob Ingebrigtsen (NOR)	3:26.73	Fontvieille, Monaco	12 July 2024
North, Central American and Caribbean record	Cole Hocker (USA)	3:27.65	Paris, France	6 August 2024
Oceanian record	Olli Hoare (AUS)	3:29.41	Oslo, Norway	15 June 2023
South American Record	Hudson Santos de Souza (BRA)	3:33.25	Rieti, Italy	28 August 2005

== Qualification standard ==
The standard to qualify automatically for entry was 3:33.00.

== Schedule ==
The event schedule, in local time (UTC+9), was as follows:

Date	Time	Round
14 September	09:35	Heats
15 September	21:30	Semi-finals
17 September	22:20	Final

== Results ==
=== Heats ===
The heats took place on 14 September. The first six athletes in each heat ( Q ) qualified for the semi-finals.

==== Heat 1 ====
Place	Athlete	Nation	Time	Notes
1	Narve Gilje Nordås	Norway	3:35.90	Q
2	Josh Kerr	Great Britain & N.I.	3:35.98	Q
3	Ethan Strand	United States	3:36.27	Q
4	Federico Riva	Italy	3:36.28 [.275]	Q
5	Stefan Nillessen	Netherlands	3:36.28 [.279]	Q
6	Tshepo Tshite	South Africa	3:36.36	Q
7	Azeddine Habz	France	3:36.62	
8	Jochem Vermeulen	Belgium	3:37.33	
9	Pol Oriach	Spain	3:37.43	
10	Fouad Messaoudi	Morocco	3:37.83	
11	Jude Thomas	Australia	3:38.19	
12	Charles Grethen	Luxembourg	3:41.18	
13	Kazuto Iizawa	Japan	3:41.76	
14	Kristian Uldbjerg Hansen	Denmark	3:47.58	
15	Hugh Kent	Guam	4:03.84	

==== Heat 2 ====
Place	Athlete	Nation	Time	Notes
1	Pietro Arese	Italy	3:40.91	Q
1	Isaac Nader	Portugal	3:40.91	Q
3	Niels Laros	Netherlands	3:41.00	Q
4	Reynold Cheruiyot	Kenya	3:41.17	Q
5	Ruben Verheyden	Belgium	3:41.45	Q
6	Foster Malleck	Canada	3:41.53	Q
7	Hafid Rizqy	Morocco	3:41.55	
8	Elliot Giles	Great Britain & N.I.	3:41.60	
9	Paul Anselmini	France	3:41.84	
10	Adam Spencer	Australia	3:42.17	
11	Håkon Moe Berg	Norway	3:42.24	
12	Cathal Doyle	Ireland	3:42.60	
13	Heithem Chenitef	Algeria	3:45.13	
14	Ermias Girma	Ethiopia	3:46.62	
15	Yeshnil Karan	Fiji	3:50.77	PB

==== Heat 3 ====
Place	Athlete	Nation	Time	Notes
1	Cole Hocker	United States	3:41.88	Q
2	Robert Farken	Germany	3:42.06	Q
3	Neil Gourley	Great Britain & N.I.	3:42.13	Q
4	Timothy Cheruiyot	Kenya	3:42.20	Q
5	Adrián Ben	Spain	3:42.27	Q
6	Raphael Pallitsch	Austria	3:42.40	Q
7	Nuno Pereira	Portugal	3:42.63	
8	Cameron Myers	Australia	3:42.75	
9	Filip Sasínek	Czech Republic	3:43.17	
10	Sam Tanner	New Zealand	3:43.37	
11	Pieter Sisk	Belgium	3:43.50	
12	Charles Philibert-Thiboutot	Canada	3:44.82	
13	Ryan Mphahlele	South Africa	3:45.22	
14	Diego Lacamoire	Argentina	3:57.42	
15	Filip Rak	Poland	4:14.93	

==== Heat 4 ====
Place	Athlete	Nation	Time	Notes
1	Jake Wightman	Great Britain & N.I.	3:36.90	Q
2	José Carlos Pinto	Portugal	3:37.09	Q
3	Jonah Koech	United States	3:37.11	Q
4	Romain Mornet	France	3:37.19	Q
5	Samuel Pihlström	Sweden	3:37.25	Q
6	Andrew Coscoran	Ireland	3:37.32	Q
7	Anass Essayi	Morocco	3:37.70	
8	Jakob Ingebrigtsen	Norway	3:37.84	
9	Joao Bussotti	Italy	3:38.38	
10	Carlos Saez	Spain	3:40.61	
11	Melese Nberet	Ethiopia	3:41.54	
12	Phanuel Koech	Kenya	3:42.77	
13	Yervand Mkrtchyan	Armenia	3:48.21	
14	Mukesh Pal	Nepal	3:53.99	
15	Kieran Lumb	Canada	3:55.04	

=== Semi-finals ===
The semi-finals took place on 15 September. The first six athletes in each heat ( Q ) qualified for the final.

==== Heat 1 ====
Place	Athlete	Nation	Time	Notes
1	Niels Laros	Netherlands	3:35.50	Q
2	Josh Kerr	Great Britain & N.I.	3:35.53	Q
3	Jake Wightman	Great Britain & N.I.	3:35.56	Q
4	Timothy Cheruiyot	Kenya	3:35.61	Q
5	Andrew Coscoran	Ireland	3:35.65	Q
6	Samuel Pihlström	Sweden	3:35.71	Q
7	Narve Gilje Nordås	Norway	3:35.72	
8	Ethan Strand	United States	3:36.15	
9	José Carlos Pinto	Portugal	3:36.23	
10	Ruben Verheyden	Belgium	3:36.31	
11	Romain Mornet	France	3:36.35	
12	Pietro Arese	Italy	3:36.83	SB

==== Heat 2 ====
Place	Athlete	Nation	Time	Notes
1	Reynold Cheruiyot	Kenya	3:36.64	Q
2	Adrián Ben	Spain	3:36.78	Q
3	Isaac Nader	Portugal	3:36.86	Q
4	Jonah Koech	United States	3:36.89	Q
5	Neil Gourley	Great Britain & N.I.	3:36.93	Q
6	Tshepo Tshite	South Africa	3:36.93	Q
7	Raphael Pallitsch	Austria	3:36.94	
8	Stefan Nillessen	Netherlands	3:37.12	
9	Robert Farken	Germany	3:37.52	qR
10	Foster Malleck	Canada	4:14.09	
11	Federico Riva	Italy	4:14.31	qJ
—	Cole Hocker	United States	DQ	17.1.2

=== Final ===
Place	Athlete	Nation	Time	Notes
1st place, gold medalist(s)	Isaac Nader	Portugal	3:34.10	
2nd place, silver medalist(s)	Jake Wightman	Great Britain & N.I.	3:34.12	
3rd place, bronze medalist(s)	Reynold Cheruiyot	Kenya	3:34.25	
4	Timothy Cheruiyot	Kenya	3:34.50	
5	Niels Laros	Netherlands	3:34.52	
6	Robert Farken	Germany	3:35.15	
7	Federico Riva	Italy	3:35.33	
8	Adrián Ben	Spain	3:35.38	
9	Tshepo Tshite	South Africa	3:35.50	
10	Neil Gourley	Great Britain & N.I.	3:35.56	
11	Samuel Pihlström	Sweden	3:35.74	
12	Andrew Coscoran	Ireland	3:35.87	
13	Jonah Koech	United States	3:37.00	
14	Josh Kerr	Great Britain & N.I.	4:11.23	
