= Netherlands at the 2025 World Athletics Championships =

- Flag of the Netherlands
- WA code: NED

in Tokyo, Japan 13 September 2025 – 21 September 2025
- Competitors: 53 (26 men and 27 women)
- Medals Ranked 4th: Gold 2 Silver 2 Bronze 2 Total 6

World Athletics Championships appearances (overview)
- 1976; 1980; 1983; 1987; 1991; 1993; 1995; 1997; 1999; 2001; 2003; 2005; 2007; 2009; 2011; 2013; 2015; 2017; 2019; 2022; 2023; 2025

The Netherlands competed at the 2025 World Athletics Championships in Tokyo, Japan, from 13 to 21 September 2025.

== Medalists ==
Medal	Athlete	Event	Date
Gold	Femke Bol	Women's 400 metres hurdles	September 19
Gold	Jessica Schilder	Women's shot put	September 20
Silver	Femke Bol; Lieke Klaver; Eugene Omalla; Jonas Phijffers; Eveline Saalberg*	Mixed 4 × 400 metres relay	September 13
Silver	Jorinde van Klinken	Women's discus throw	September 14
Bronze	Nsikak Ekpo; Taymir Burnet; Xavi Mo-Ajok; Elvis Afrifa	Men's 4 × 100 metres relay	September 21
Bronze	Eveline Saalberg; Lieke Klaver; Lisanne de Witte; Femke Bol; Myrte van der Schoot*	Women's 4 × 400 metres relay	September 21

* – Indicates the athlete competed in preliminaries but not the final

== Entrants ==
Ahead of the championships in August, long distance runner Sifan Hassan, who competed since 2015 at all World Athletics Championships winning six medals including two gold, announced not to compete at the World Championships because it was not possible after she already competed at the London Marathon and Sydney Marathon. Also, heptathlete Anouk Vetter announced not to compete at the Championships due to inadequate preparations.

The Netherlands entered 53 athletes to the championships. It is the biggest Dutch team at the World Athletics Championships ever. The Dutch team aims for at least four medals at the Championships. The biggest contenders for a medal were considered in advance the 4x400 metres mixed relay team; Femke Bol (400 metres hurdles), Niels Laros (1500 metres), Jessica Schilder (shot put), and apart from those also Nadine Visser (100 metres hurdles), Sofie Dokter (heptathlon), and possibly Jorinde van Klinken (discus throw).

== Results ==
Key

- Q = Qualified for the next round
- q = Qualified for the next round as a fastest loser or, in field events, by position without achieving the qualifying target
- NR = National record
- PB = Personal best
- SB = Season best
- N/A = Round not applicable for the event

=== Men ===
Track and road events

Athlete	Event	Heat		Semifinal		Final	
Athlete	Event	Result	Rank	Result	Rank	Result	Rank
Elvis Afrifa	100 metres	10.15	4 q	10.20	7	Did not advance	
Taymir Burnet	100 metres	10.21	6	Did not advance			
Xavi Mo-Ajok	200 metres	20.35	2 Q	20.55	6	Did not advance	
Isaya Klein Ikkink	400 metres	46.32	8	Did not advance			
Eugene Omalla	400 metres	45.97	8	Did not advance			
Jonas Phijffers	400 metres	46.26	7	Did not advance			
Samuel Chapple	800 metres	1:45.45	4	Did not advance			
Ryan Clarke	800 metres	1:49.08	9	Did not advance			
Niels Laros	1500 metres	3:41.00	3 Q	3:35.50	1 Q	3:34.52	5
Stefan Nillessen	1500 metres	3:36.28	5 Q	3:37.12	8	Did not advance	
Mike Foppen	5000 metres	13:13.97	7 Q	—N/a		13:05.94	12
Niels Laros	5000 metres	Did not finish		—N/a		Did not advance	
Tom Hendrikse	Marathon	—N/a				2:19:57 SB	43
Job Geerds	110 metres hurdles	13.51	6 q	Did not start		Did not advance	
Elvis Afrifa; Taymir Burnet; Nsikak Ekpo; Xavi Mo-Ajok	4 × 100 metres relay	37.95	2 Q	—N/a		37.81 NR	3rd place, bronze medalist(s)
Terrence Agard; Ramsey Angela; Liemarvin Bonevacia; Eugene Omalla*; Jonas Phijffers	4 × 400 metres relay	3:00.23 SB	3 Q	—N/a		3:04.84	8

Field events

Athlete	Event	Qualification		Final	
Athlete	Event	Distance	Position	Distance	Position
Menno Vloon	Pole vault	5.75	5 q	5.90	7
Shaquille Emanuelson	Discus throw	62.04	23	Did not advance	
Ruben Rolvink	Discus throw	63.28	17	Did not advance	
Denzel Comenentia	Hammer throw	75.91	12 q	74.86	12

Combined events – Decathlon

Athlete	Event	100 m	LJ	SP	HJ	400 m	110H	DT	PV	JT	1500 m	Final	Rank
Sven Roosen	Result	10.72	7.26	14.93	NM	DNS	—N/a					DNF	
Sven Roosen	Points	924	876	785	0	DNS	—N/a					DNF	

=== Women ===
Track and road events

Athlete	Event	Heat		Semifinal		Final	
Athlete	Event	Result	Rank	Result	Rank	Result	Rank
Minke Bisschops	200 metres	Did not start					
Marije van Hunenstijn	200 metres	23.13	6	Did not advance			
Lieke Klaver	400 metres	50.32	1 Q	50.25	4	Did not advance	
Eveline Saalberg	400 metres	51.73	6	Did not advance			
Myrte van der Schoot	400 metres	52.19	7	Did not advance			
Marissa Damink-Van der Meijden	1500 metres	4:11.18	10	Did not advance			
Amina Maatoug	1500 metres	4:09.25	11	Did not advance			
Diane van Es	5000 metres	15:12.57	15	—N/a		Did not advance	
Maureen Koster	5000 metres	14:46.57	4 Q	—N/a		15:07.58	14
Marcella Herzog	Marathon	—N/a				2:39:57 SB	40
Anne Luijten	Marathon	—N/a				2:32:27	17
Veerle Bakker	3000 metres steeplechase	9:41.72	9	—N/a		Did not advance	
Maayke Tjin A-Lim	100 metres hurdles	12.71	3 Q	12.85	4	Did not advance	
Nadine Visser	100 metres hurdles	12.48	1 Q	12.45	2 Q	12.56	8
Femke Bol	400 metres hurdles	53.75	1 Q	52.31	1 Q	51.54 WL	1st place, gold medalist(s)
Isabel van den Berg; Britt de Blaauw; Marije van Hunenstijn; Demi van den Wildenberg	4 × 100 metres relay	43.62	4	—N/a		Did not advance	
Femke Bol; Lieke Klaver; Eveline Saalberg; Myrte van der Schoot*; Lisanne de Witte	4 × 400 metres relay	3:24.03 SB	3 Q	—N/a		3:20.18 SB	3rd place, bronze medalist(s)

Field events

Athlete	Event	Qualification		Final	
Athlete	Event	Distance	Position	Distance	Position
Britt Weerman	High jump	NM		Did not advance	
Pauline Hondema	Long jump	6.66	7 q	6.60	7
Jorinde van Klinken	Shot put	17.45	22	Did not advance	
Jessica Schilder	Shot put	18.98	8 q	20.29	1st place, gold medalist(s)
Alida van Daalen	Discus throw	62.65	12 q	62.24	11
Jorinde van Klinken	Discus throw	66.39	2 Q	67.50 SB	2nd place, silver medalist(s)

Combined events – Heptathlon

Athlete	Event	100H	HJ	SP	200 m	LJ	JT	800 m	Final	Rank
Sofie Dokter	Result	13.62	1.86 m	13.98 m	23.70	6.16 m	42.61 m	2:12.63	6432	6
Sofie Dokter	Points	1033	1054	793	1010	899	717	926	6432	6
Emma Oosterwegel	Result	13.28	1.74 m	13.34 m	24.03	5.94 m	50.19 m	2:09.48	6381 SB	9
Emma Oosterwegel	Points	1083	903	750	978	831	864	972	6381 SB	9

=== Mixed ===
Track events

Athlete	Event	Heat		Final	
Athlete	Event	Result	Rank	Result	Rank
Femke Bol; Lieke Klaver; Eugene Omalla; Jonas Phijffers; Eveline Saalberg*	4 × 400 metres relay	3:11.11 SB	2 Q	3:09.96 SB	2nd place, silver medalist(s)
