= Porto Marathon =

Road running event in Porto, Portugal

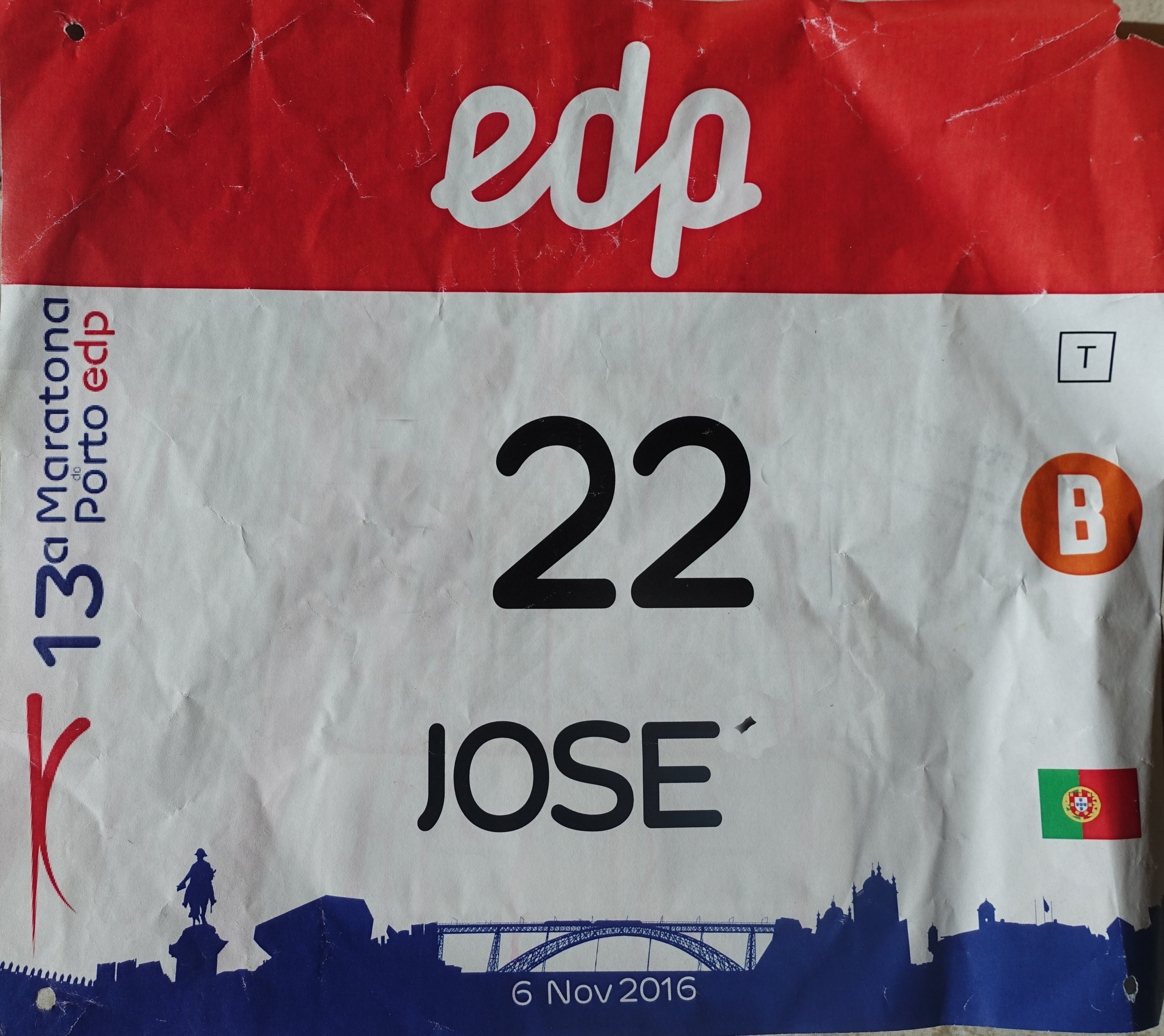
- Porto Marathon
- Date: November
- Location: Porto, Portugal
- Event type: Road
- Distance: Marathon
- Primary sponsor: EDP
- Established: 2004
- Course records: Men: 2:08:58 (2021) (Kenya) Zablon Chumba; Women: 2:26:58 (2017) (Kenya) Monica Jepkoech
- Website: Porto Marathon
- Participants: 1,976 finishers (2021); 3,836 (2019); 4,657 (2018)

The Porto Marathon is an annual marathon race in the city of Porto, Portugal, held in October or November, since 2004.

Along with the marathon, several races of shorter distances are arranged as well. The marathon is sponsored by Energias de Portugal.

In 2009, 857 athletes competed the marathon. In 2010, 1180 athletes competed the marathon. In 2013, 2755 athletes competed the marathon, becoming the largest marathon in Portugal.

The 2020 edition of the race was postponed to 2021 due to the coronavirus pandemic, with all registrants given the option of transferring their entry to another runner or to 2022.

== Winners and finishers ==
Key: Course record

Year	Finishers	Men's winner	Time	Women's winner	Time
2024		Abel Chelangat (UGA)	2:10:01	Naom Jebet (KEN)	2:30:00
2023		Emmanuel Kemboi (KEN)	2:14:13	Tejitu Siyum (ETH)	2:32:06
2022	2874	James Mwangui (KEN)	2:08:47	Jepkemboi Kimutai (KEN)	2:29:58
2021	1976	Zablon Chumba (KEN)	2:08:58	Kidsan Alema (ETH)	2:28:01
2020	Not held (COVID-19)				
2019	3836	Deso Gelmisa (ETH)	2:09:08	Gada Bekele (ETH)	2:33:38
2018	4678	Robert Chemonges (UGA)	2:09:05	Abeba-Tekulu Gebremeskel (ETH)	2:30:13
2017	4584	Jackson Limo (KEN)	2:11:34	Monica Jepkoech (KEN)	2:26:58
2016	4752	Samuel Mwaniki (KEN)	2:11:48	Loice Kiptoo (KEN)	2:29:13
2015	4558	Gilbert Koech (KEN)	2:14:04	Brigid Kosgei (KEN)	2:47:59
2014	4042	Workneh Fikre (ERI)	2:13:10	Marta Tigabea (ETH)	2:31:54
2013	2755	Joash Mutai (KEN)	2:13:04	Chaltu Waka (ETH)	2:37:47
2012	1668	Anthony Wairuri (KEN)	2:12:14	Abeba Gebremeskele (ETH)	2:39:51
2011	1545	Philemon Baaru (KEN)	2:09:51	Pauline Chepchumba (KEN)	2:41:24
2010	1180	Alex Kirui (KEN)	2:14:25	Beatrice Toroitich (KEN)	2:37:49
2009	857	Johnstone Changwony (KEN)	2:13:12	Priscah Jeptoo (KEN)	2:30:40
2008	583	Samuel Mugo (KEN)	2:11:08	Tirfi Tsegaye (ETH)	2:35:31
2007	412	Edwin Kimutai (KEN)	2:15:12	Marisa Barros (POR)	2:31:31
2006	373	Lawrence Saina (KEN)	2:09:52	Aureliana Edmundo (POR)	2:57:35
2005	310	Ruben Chepkwick (KEN)	2:22:27	Fátima Silva (POR)	2:45:09
2004	317	Steven Kiprotich (KEN)	2:13:57	Natália Pinto (POR)	2:58:09

== Gallery ==
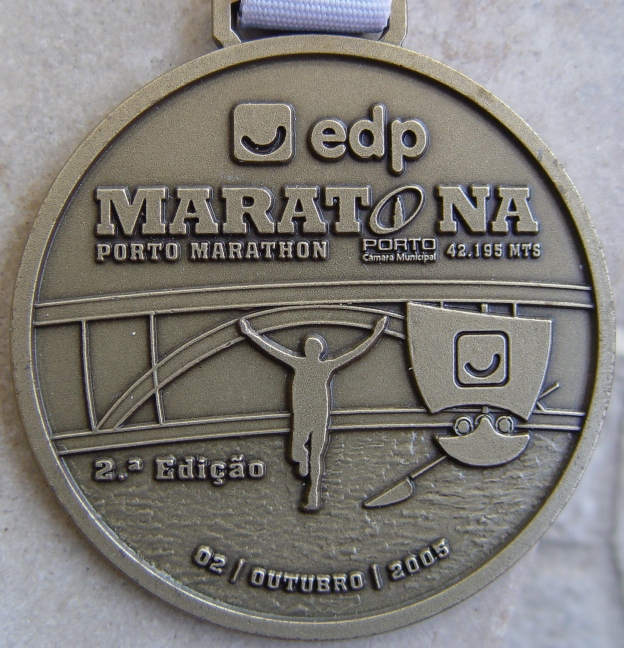
Marathon 2005 medal

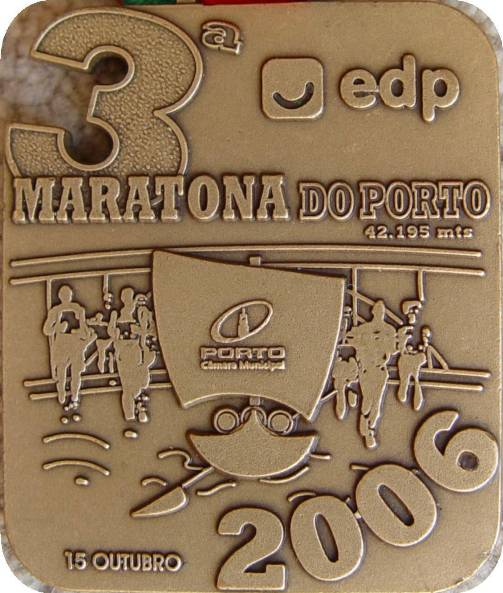
Marathon 2006 medal

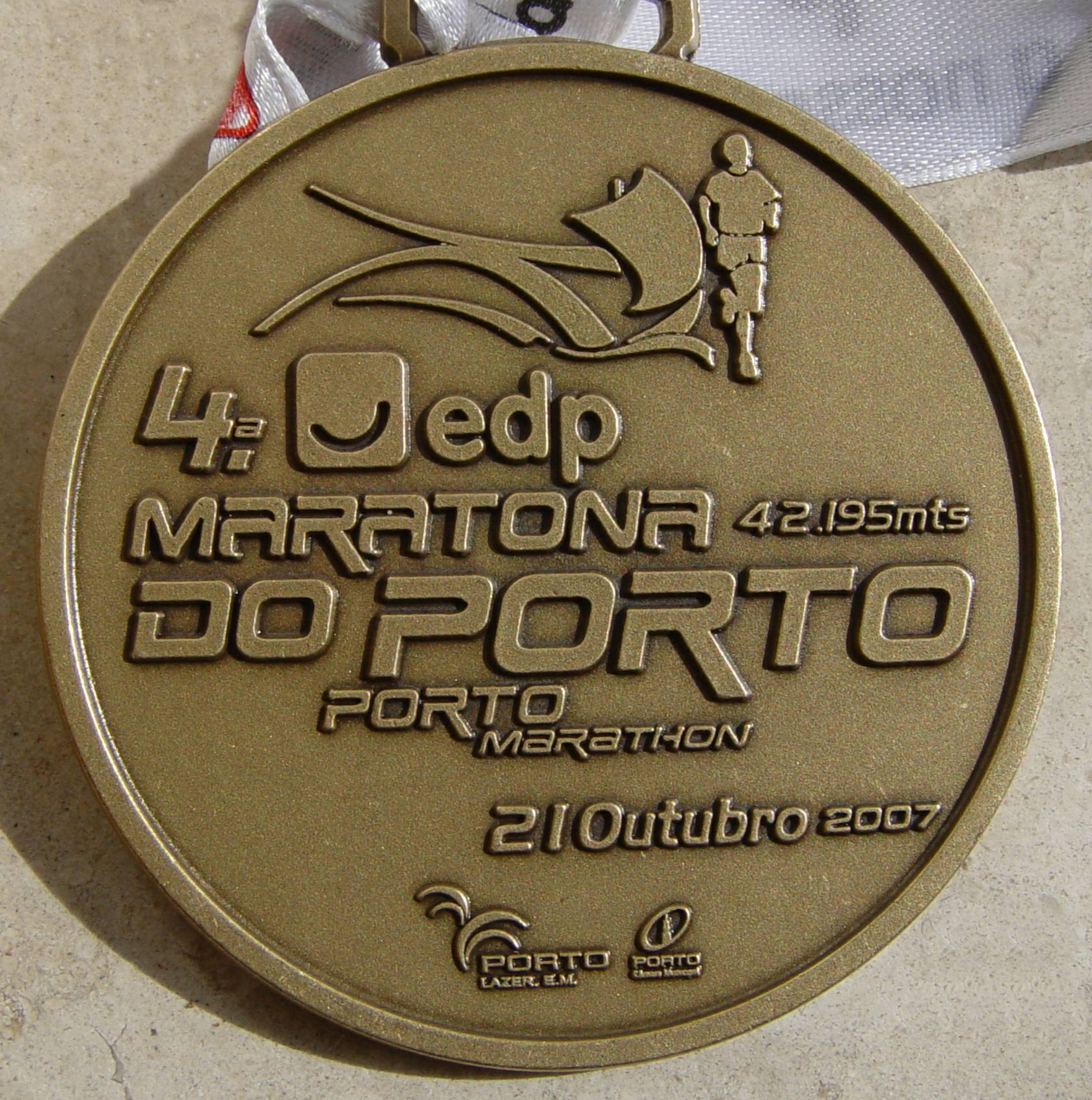
Marathon 2007 medal

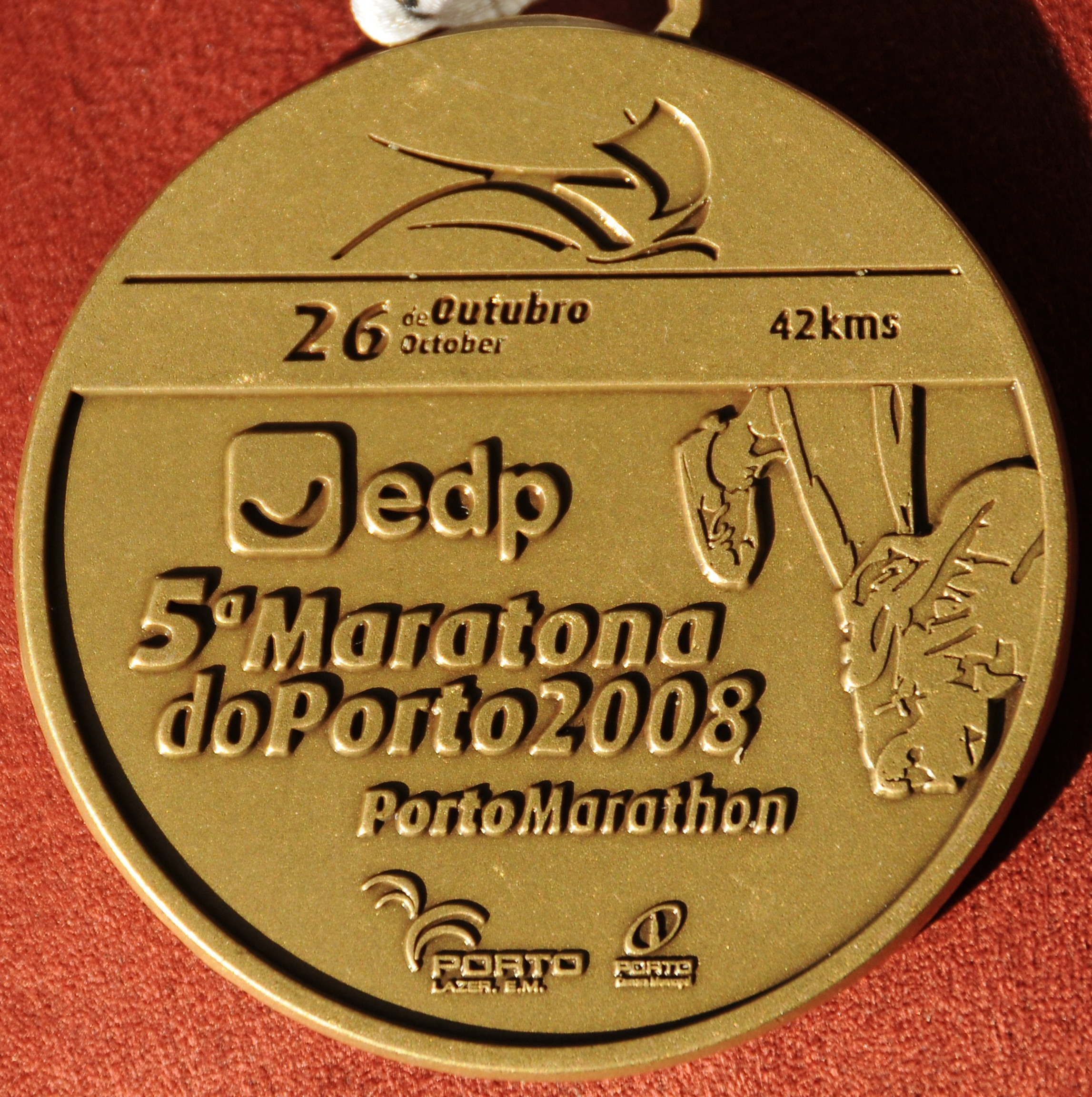
Marathon 2008 medal

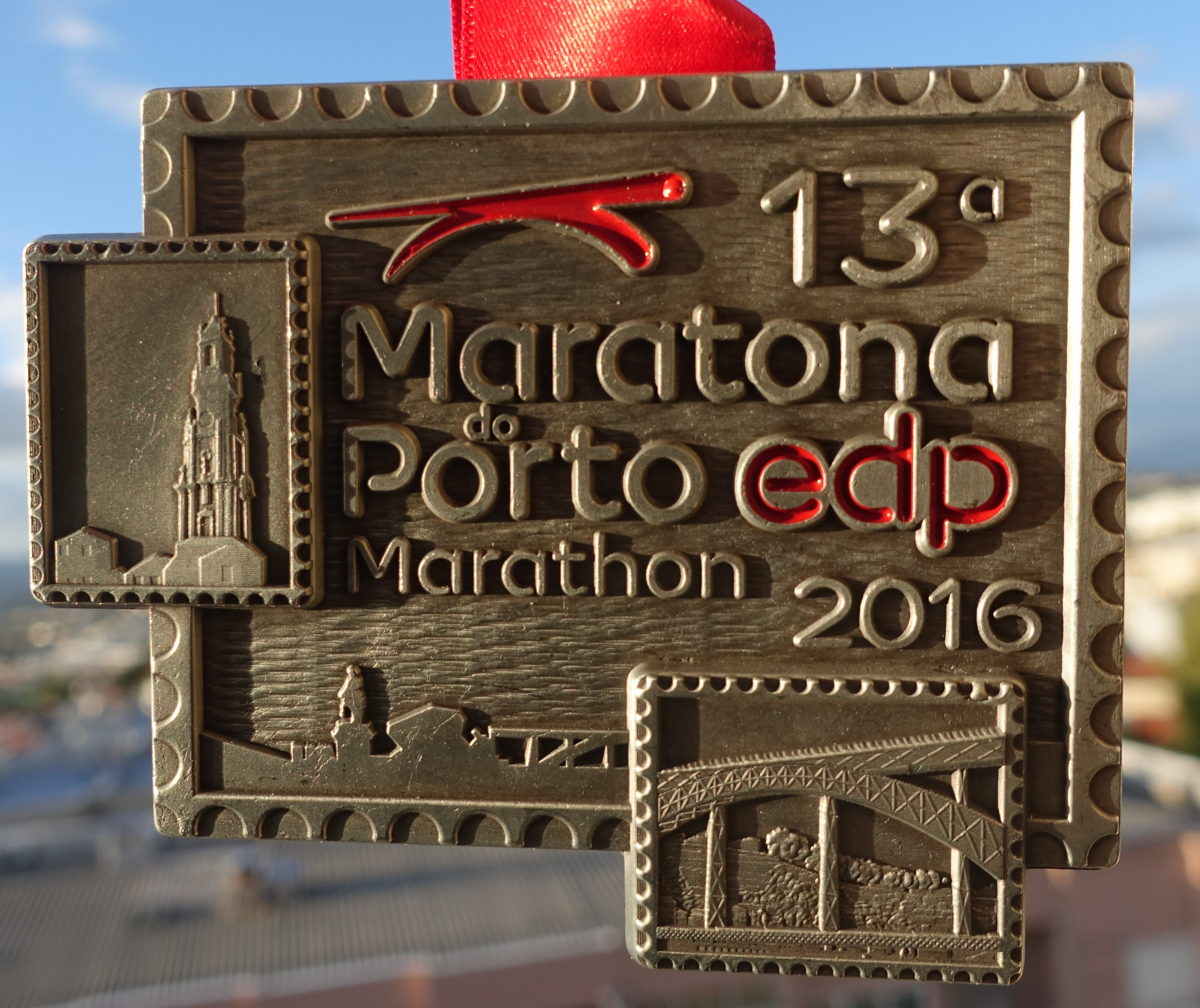
Marathon 2016 medal
