= 2025 World Athletics Championships – Women's 1500 metres =

Women's 1500 metres at the 2025 World Athletics Championships
- Venue: National Stadium
- Location: Tokyo, Japan
- Dates: 13 September (heats); 14 September (semi-finals); 16 September (final)
- Winning time: 3:52.15

Medalists
gold medal	Faith Kipyegon	Kenya
silver medal	Dorcus Ewoi	Kenya
bronze medal	Jessica Hull	Australia

The women's 1500 metres at the 2025 World Athletics Championships was held at the National Stadium in Tokyo on 13, 14 and 16 September 2025.

== Summary ==
To say Faith Kipyegon owns this event is almost an understatement. She had won every major since 2016, save a monster finishing kick by Sifan Hassan in 2019, meaning three Olympic gold medals and three World championships in this event alone. Her 2025 was spent trying to break the 4 minute mile for Nike and TV. Ultimately she did set a legitimate new world record in that event. Her 1500 world record dates back to last year. Few rivals returned from the 2023 championships include fifth place Nelly Chepchirchir, Laura Muir and Jessica Hull. Hull won the silver medal at the Olympics and over the last couple of years, shown the ability to keep up with Kipyegon. When Kipyegon was attempting to break the world record in the 3000 metres earlier in the year, Hull served as pacemaker.

In the semifinal round, there was some unnecessary contact leaving Marta Zenoni disqualified, Nele Weßel advance by the referee and Salomé Afonso advanced by the Jury of Appeals.

The final went off in less dramatic fashion. The field slowly collapsed to the point that Kipyegon had the lead going into the first turn. Sinclaire Johnson took the second position directly behind, then through the turn Hull came around the outside to take her position second in the hierarchy. Chepchirchir took up residence on the outside of lane 1 next to Johnson with the third Kenyan Dorcus Ewoi directly behind. Nobody made a significant move through the first two laps as the field strung out as each runner couldn't keep up. Starting the third lap, Freweyni Hailu ran around the stretching out pack to try to join the party at the front. Going in to the bell, Johnson was falling back allowing a separation in the field with Nikki Hiltz the last of six in position to run for the money. As Kipyegon drove from the front, in just a 100m turn, Hailu and Hiltz were falling off the back. Down the backstretch, Chepchirchir and Ewoi were losing ground, but Hull was determined not to let Kipyegon get away. Through the final turn, Kipyegon turned the screw slowly building a 5-metre lead. As Hull made one more final effort to sprint for home, behind her Chepchirchir and Ewoi were battling over who would get bronze. Foretold by her race in the Diamond League final, Hull's racing legs started to give out 50 metres before the finish line. Ewoi set off trying to improve her medal. After she was passed by Ewoi, Hull's form fell apart. Struggling badly, she barely got over the finish line ahead of Chepchirchir. Now Kipyegon had completed her World Championship threepeat matching the Olympic one she completed last year.

== Records ==
Before the competition records were as follows:

Record	Athlete & Nat.	Perf.	Location	Date
World record	Faith Kipyegon (KEN)	3:48.68	Eugene, United States	5 July 2025
Championship record	Sifan Hassan (NED)	3:51.95	Doha, Qatar	5 October 2019
World Leading	Faith Kipyegon (KEN)	3:48.68	Eugene, United States	5 July 2025
African Record	Faith Kipyegon (KEN)	3:48.68	Eugene, United States	5 July 2025
Asian Record	Qu Yunxia (CHN)	3:50.46	Beijing, China	11 September 1993
European Record	Sifan Hassan (NED)	3:51.95	Doha, Qatar	5 October 2019
North, Central American and Caribbean record	Shelby Houlihan (USA)	3:54.99	Doha, Qatar	5 October 2019
Oceanian record	Jessica Hull (AUS)	3:50.83	Paris, France	7 July 2024
South American Record	Letitia Vriesde (SUR)	4:05.67	Tokyo, Japan	31 August 1991

== Qualification standard ==
The standard to qualify automatically for entry was 4:01.50.

== Schedule ==
The event schedule, in local time (UTC+9), was as follows:

Date	Time	Round
13 September	19:50	Heats
14 September	21:07	Semi-finals
16 September	22:05	Final

== Results ==
=== Heats ===
The heats took place on 13 September. The first six athletes in each heat ( Q ) qualified for the semi-finals.

==== Heat 1 ====
Place	Athlete	Nation	Time	Notes
1	Jessica Hull	Australia	4:04.40	Q
2	Sinclaire Johnson	United States	4:04.59	Q
3	Gaia Sabbatini	Italy	4:04.93	Q
4	Dorcus Ewoi	Kenya	4:04.99	Q
5	Marta Pérez	Spain	4:05.14	Q
6	Weronika Lizakowska	Poland	4:05.35	Q
7	Vera Sjöberg	Sweden	4:06.01	
8	Erin Wallace	Great Britain & N.I.	4:06.07	
9	Saron Berhe	Ethiopia	4:07.06	
10	Nozomi Tanaka	Japan	4:07.34	
11	Amina Maatoug	Netherlands	4:09.25	
12	Lilly Nägeli	Switzerland	4:12.30	
13	Laura Nicholson	Ireland	4:14.12	
14	María Pía Fernández	Uruguay	4:28.10	

==== Heat 2 ====
Place	Athlete	Nation	Time	Notes
1	Nelly Chepchirchir	Kenya	4:07.01	Q
2	Klaudia Kazimierska	Poland	4:07.34	Q
3	Salomé Afonso	Portugal	4:07.44	Q
4	Linden Hall	Australia	4:07.61	Q
5	Emily Mackay	United States	4:08.19	Q
6	Revée Walcott-Nolan	Great Britain & N.I.	4:08.67	Q
7	Lucia Stafford	Canada	4:08.98	
8	Şilan Ayyıldız	Turkey	4:09.50	
9	Anne Gine Løvnes	Norway	4:10.61	
10	Marissa Damink	Netherlands	4:11.18	
11	Pooja Olla	India	4:13.75	
12	Wilma Nielsen	Sweden	4:13.98	
13	Bahiya El Arfaoui	Morocco	4:17.17	
14	Lodkeo Inthakoumman	Laos	4:45.13	SB

==== Heat 3 ====
Place	Athlete	Nation	Time	Notes
1	Freweyni Hailu	Ethiopia	4:01.23	Q
2	Nikki Hiltz	United States	4:01.73	Q
3	Susan Ejore	Kenya	4:01.99	Q
4	Gabriela DeBues-Stafford	Canada	4:02.00	Q
5	Agathe Guillemot	France	4:02.05	Q
6	Sophie O'Sullivan	Ireland	4:02.12	Q, SB
7	Esther Guerrero	Spain	4:02.20	
8	Joceline Wind	Switzerland	4:04.29	
9	Sarah Billings	Australia	4:06.22	
10	Jolanda Kallabis	Germany	4:08.71	
11	Knight Aciru	Uganda	4:09.79	
12	Ludovica Cavalli	Italy	4:09.91	
13	Adelle Tracey	Jamaica	4:11.87	
14	Tomoka Kimura	Japan	4:15.70	

==== Heat 4 ====
Place	Athlete	Nation	Time	Notes
1	Faith Kipyegon	Kenya	4:02.55	Q
2	Sarah Madeleine	France	4:02.66	Q
3	Sarah Healy	Ireland	4:02.67	Q
4	Marta Zenoni	Italy	4:02.77	Q
5	Gabija Galvydytė	Lithuania	4:02.81	Q
6	Nele Weßel	Germany	4:03.57	Q, PB
7	Águeda Marqués	Spain	4:04.13	
8	Laura Muir	Great Britain & N.I.	4:05.59	
9	Vera Bertemes-Hoffmann	Luxembourg	4:06.11	
10	Kate Current	Canada	4:07.52	
11	Sofia Thøgersen	Denmark	4:08.48	SB
12	Micaela Levaggi	Argentina	4:09.76	NR
13	Mia Barnett	Sweden	4:16.71	
14	Gresa Bakraçi	Kosovo	4:22.06	
15	Ingeborg Østgård	Norway	4:27.56	

=== Semi-finals ===
The semi-finals took place on 13 September. The first six athletes in each heat ( Q ) qualified for the final.

==== Heat 1 ====
Place	Athlete	Nation	Time	Notes
1	Faith Kipyegon	Kenya	4:00.34	Q
2	Dorcus Ewoi	Kenya	4:00.65	Q
3	Freweyni Hailu	Ethiopia	4:01.03	Q
4	Sinclaire Johnson	United States	4:01.08	Q
5	Marta Pérez	Spain	4:01.19	Q
6	Sarah Madeleine	France	4:01.30	Q
7	Linden Hall	Australia	4:01.65	
8	Gabija Galvydytė	Lithuania	4:01.79	
9	Weronika Lizakowska	Poland	4:03.39	
10	Emily Mackay	United States	4:12.80	
11	Gaia Sabbatini	Italy	4:12.93	
12	Sophie O'Sullivan	Ireland	4:18.18	

==== Heat 2 ====
Place	Athlete	Nation	Time	Notes
1	Nelly Chepchirchir	Kenya	4:06.86	Q
2	Jessica Hull	Australia	4:06.87	Q
3	Nikki Hiltz	United States	4:07.04	Q
4	Klaudia Kazimierska	Poland	4:07.83	Q
5	Gabriela DeBues-Stafford	Canada	4:08.29	Q
6	Sarah Healy	Ireland	4:08.78	Q
7	Susan Ejore	Kenya	4:09.28	
8	Revée Walcott-Nolan	Great Britain & N.I.	4:11.07	
9	Agathe Guillemot	France	4:11.33	
10	Salomé Afonso	Portugal	4:15.08	qJ
11	Nele Weßel	Germany	4:18.21	qR
—	Marta Zenoni	Italy	DQ	17.1.2

=== Final ===
The final took place on 16 September.

Place	Athlete	Nation	Time	Notes
1st place, gold medalist(s)	Faith Kipyegon	Kenya	3:52.15	
2nd place, silver medalist(s)	Dorcus Ewoi	Kenya	3:54.92	PB
3rd place, bronze medalist(s)	Jessica Hull	Australia	3:55.16	
4	Nelly Chepchirchir	Kenya	3:55.25	PB
5	Nikki Hiltz	United States	3:57.08	
6	Freweyni Hailu	Ethiopia	3:57.33	
7	Klaudia Kazimierska	Poland	3:57.95	PB
8	Sarah Madeleine	France	3:58.09	PB
9	Marta Pérez	Spain	3:58.54	SB
10	Sarah Healy	Ireland	3:59.14	
11	Gabriela DeBues-Stafford	Canada	3:59.65	SB
12	Salomé Afonso	Portugal	4:00.47	
13	Sinclaire Johnson	United States	4:00.92	
14	Nele Weßel	Germany	4:10.31	
