= 2025 World Athletics Championships – Women's 5000 metres =

Women's 5000 metres at the 2025 World Athletics Championships
- Venue: National Stadium
- Location: Tokyo, Japan
- Dates: 18 September (heats); 20 September (final)
- Winning time: 14:54.36

Medalists
gold medal	Beatrice Chebet	Kenya
silver medal	Faith Kipyegon	Kenya
bronze medal	Nadia Battocletti	Italy

The women's 5000 metres at the 2025 World Athletics Championships was held at the National Stadium in Tokyo on 18 and 20 September 2025.

== Records ==
Before the competition records were as follows:

Record	Athlete & Nat.	Perf.	Location	Date
World record	Beatrice Chebet (KEN)	13:58.06	Eugene, United States	5 July 2025
Championship record	Hellen Obiri (KEN)	14:26.72	Doha, Qatar	5 October 2019
World Leading	Beatrice Chebet (KEN)	13:58.06	Eugene, United States	5 July 2025
African Record	Beatrice Chebet (KEN)	13:58.06	Eugene, United States	5 July 2025
Asian Record	Bo Jiang (CHN)	14:28.09	Shanghai, China	23 October 1997
European Record	Sifan Hassan (NED)	14:13.42	London, United Kingdom	23 July 2023
North, Central American and Caribbean record	Alicia Monson (USA)	14:19.45	London, United Kingdom	23 July 2023
Oceanian record	Rose Davies (AUS)	14:31.45	London, United Kingdom	19 July 2025
South American Record	Joselyn Daniely Brea (VEN)	14:36.59	Los Angeles, United States	17 May 2024

== Qualification standard ==
The standard to qualify automatically for entry was 14:50.00.

== Schedule ==
The event schedule, in local time (UTC+9), is as follows:

Date	Time	Round
18 September	19:05	Heats
20 September	21:29	Final

== Results ==
=== Heats ===
The heats took place on 18 September. The first eight athletes in each heat ( Q ) qualify for the final.

==== Heat 1 ====
Place	Athlete	Nation	Time	Notes
1	Beatrice Chebet	Kenya	14:45.59	Q
2	Nadia Battocletti	Italy	14:46.36	Q
3	Shelby Houlihan	United States	14:46.52	Q
4	Maureen Koster	Netherlands	14:46.57	Q
5	Nozomi Tanaka	Japan	14:47.14	Q
6	Fantaye Belayneh	Ethiopia	14:47.46	Q
7	Hannah Nuttall	Great Britain & N.I.	14:48.09	Q
8	Joy Cheptoyek	Uganda	14:51.17	Q
9	Birke Haylom	Ethiopia	14:53.49	
10	Elise Cranny	United States	15:00.23	SB
11	Elise Vanderelst	Belgium	15:00.52	
12	Gabriela DeBues-Stafford	Canada	15:04.30	
13	He Wuga	China	15:06.01	PB
14	Margaret Akidor	Kenya	15:10.91	
15	Idaira Prieto	Spain	15:11.16	
16	Melissa Courtney-Bryant	Great Britain & N.I.	15:27.70	
17	Georgia Griffith	Australia	15:33.15	
18	Yuma Yamamoto	Japan	15:36.29	
19	Elena Burkard	Germany	15:37.33	
20	Farida Abaroge	Athlete Refugee Team	16:27.35	

==== Heat 2 ====
Place	Athlete	Nation	Time	Notes
1	Gudaf Tsegay	Ethiopia	14:56.46	Q
2	Faith Kipyegon	Kenya	14:56.71	Q, SB
3	Rose Davies	Australia	14:56.83	Q
4	Marta García	Spain	14:56.96	Q
5	Medina Eisa	Ethiopia	14:57.03	Q
6	Josette Andrews	United States	14:57.59	Q
7	Linden Hall	Australia	14:57.80	Q
8	Agnes Jebet Ngetich	Kenya	14:57.90	Q
9	Samiyah Hassan Nour	Djibouti	15:00.95	
10	Sarah Lahti	Sweden	15:05.13	
11	Lea Meyer	Germany	15:05.86	
12	Federica Del Buono	Italy	15:08.48	SB
13	Ririka Hironaka	Japan	15:10.68	
14	Regan Yee	Canada	15:12.30	
15	Diane van Es	Netherlands	15:12.57	
16	Micol Majori	Italy	15:14.66	
17	Jana van Lent	Belgium	15:14.93	
18	Innes Fitzgerald	Great Britain & N.I.	15:15.83	
19	Anisleidis Ochoa	Cuba	15:31.35	NR
20	Mariana Machado	Portugal	15:39.61	

=== Final ===
Place	Athlete	Nation	Time	Notes
1st place, gold medalist(s)	Beatrice Chebet	Kenya	14:54.36	
2nd place, silver medalist(s)	Faith Kipyegon	Kenya	14:55.07	SB
3rd place, bronze medalist(s)	Nadia Battocletti	Italy	14:55.42	
4	Shelby Houlihan	United States	14:57.42	
5	Gudaf Tsegay	Ethiopia	14:57.82	
6	Josette Andrews	United States	15:00.25	
7	Marta García	Spain	15:01.02	
8	Hannah Nuttall	Great Britain & N.I.	15:01.25	
9	Fantaye Belayneh	Ethiopia	15:02.05	
10	Rose Davies	Australia	15:03.61	
11	Linden Hall	Australia	15:04.03	
12	Nozomi Tanaka	Japan	15:07.34	
13	Medina Eisa	Ethiopia	15:07.47	
14	Maureen Koster	Netherlands	15:07.58	
15	Agnes Jebet Ngetich	Kenya	15:13.78	
16	Joy Cheptoyek	Uganda	15:18.98	
