= 2025 World Athletics Championships – Women's 3000 metres steeplechase =

Women's 3000 metres steeplechase at the 2025 World Athletics Championships
- Venue: National Stadium
- Location: Tokyo, Japan
- Dates: 15 September (heats); 17 September (final)
- Winning time: 8:51.59 CR

Medalists
gold medal	Faith Cherotich	Kenya
silver medal	Winfred Yavi	Bahrain
bronze medal	Sembo Almayew	Ethiopia

The women's 3000 metres steeplechase at the 2025 World Athletics Championships will be held at the National Stadium in Tokyo on 15 and 17 September 2025.

== Records ==
Before the competition records were as follows:

Record	Athlete & Nat.	Perf.	Location	Date
World record	Beatrice Chepkoech (KEN)	8:44.32	Fontvieille, Monaco	20 July 2018
Championship record	Norah Jeruto (KAZ)	8:53.02	Eugene, United States	20 July 2022
World Leading	Winfred Yavi (BHR)	8:45.25	Eugene, United States	5 July 2025
African Record	Beatrice Chepkoech (KEN)	8:44.32	Fontvieille, Monaco	20 July 2018
Asian Record	Winfred Yavi (BHR)	8:44.39	Rome, Italy	30 August 2024
European Record	Alice Finot (FRA)	8:58.67	Paris, France	6 August 2024
North, Central American and Caribbean record	Courtney Frerichs (USA)	8:57.77	Eugene, United States	21 August 2021
Oceanian record	Genevieve Lacaze (AUS)	9:14.28	Paris, France	27 August 2016
South American Record	Tatiane Raquel da Silva (BRA)	9:24.38	Watford, United Kingdom	11 June 2022

== Qualification standard ==
The standard to qualify automatically for entry was 9:18.00.

== Schedule ==
The event schedule, in local time (UTC+9), is as follows:

Date	Time	Round
15 September	10:30	Heats
17 September	21:57	Final

== Results ==
=== Heats ===
The heats took place on 15 September. The first five athletes in each heat ( Q ) qualified for the final.

==== Heat 1 ====
Place	Athlete	Nation	Time	Notes
1	Faith Cherotich	Kenya	9:13.95	Q
2	Norah Jeruto	Kazakhstan	9:14.25	Q
3	Elise Thorner	Great Britain & N.I.	9:14.25	Q, PB
4	Flavie Renouard	France	9:14.69	Q, PB
5	Lexy Halladay	United States	9:15.06	Q
6	Olivia Gürth	Germany	9:15.28	SB
7	Celestine Jepkosgei Biwot	Kenya	9:22.55	
8	Loice Chekwemoi	Uganda	9:25.34	SB
9	Veerle Bakker	Netherlands	9:41.72	
10	Kinga Królik	Poland	9:43.89	
11	Ankita Dhyani	India	10:03.22	
—	Alemnat Walle	Ethiopia	DNF	

==== Heat 2 ====
Place	Athlete	Nation	Time	Notes
1	Winfred Yavi	Bahrain	9:15.63	Q
2	Marwa Bouzayani	Tunisia	9:15.68	Q
3	Sembo Almayew	Ethiopia	9:15.84	Q
4	Gesa Felicitas Krause	Germany	9:16.76	Q, SB
5	Angelina Napoleon	United States	9:18.03	Q
6	Adva Cohen	Israel	9:19.90	NR
7	Marta Serrano	Spain	9:21.00	PB
8	Ilona Mononen	Finland	9:21.02	NR
9	Parul Chaudhary	India	9:22.24	
10	Pamela Kosgei	Kenya	9:28.21	
11	Amy Cashin	Australia	9:50.53	
12	Tatiane Raquel da Silva	Brazil	9:59.81	
—	Sara Tait	Great Britain & N.I.	DNF	

==== Heat 3 ====
Place	Athlete	Nation	Time	Notes
1	Peruth Chemutai	Uganda	9:07.68	Q
2	Doris Lemngole	Kenya	9:08.97	Q
3	Lomi Muleta	Ethiopia	9:12.20	Q, SB
4	Lea Meyer	Germany	9:13.18	Q
5	Kaylee Mitchell	United States	9:15.52	Q
6	Miu Saito	Japan	9:24.72	NR
7	Alicja Konieczek	Poland	9:28.80	
8	Grace Fetherstonhaugh	Canada	9:32.09	
9	Daisy Jepkemei	Kazakhstan	9:41.36	
10	Cara Feain-Ryan	Australia	9:42.62	
11	Rihab Dhahri	Tunisia	9:51.58	
12	Stella Rutto	Romania	9:55.76	

=== Final ===
Place	Athlete	Nation	Time	Notes
1st place, gold medalist(s)	Faith Cherotich	Kenya	8:51.59	CR
2nd place, silver medalist(s)	Winfred Yavi	Bahrain	8:56.46	
3rd place, bronze medalist(s)	Sembo Almayew	Ethiopia	8:58.86	PB
4	Marwa Bouzayani	Tunisia	9:01.46	NR
5	Doris Lemngole	Kenya	9:02.39	
6	Norah Jeruto	Kazakhstan	9:06.34	
7	Gesa Felicitas Krause	Germany	9:14.27	SB
8	Lomi Muleta	Ethiopia	9:14.90	
9	Angelina Napoleon	United States	9:17.44	
10	Kaylee Mitchell	United States	9:18.66	
11	Elise Thorner	Great Britain & N.I.	9:19.02	
12	Lea Meyer	Germany	9:24.42	
13	Flavie Renouard	France	9:25.15	
14	Lexy Halladay	United States	9:34.03	
	Peruth Chemutai	Uganda	DNF	
