= Canada at the 2025 World Athletics Championships =

- Flag of Canada
- WA code: CAN

in Tokyo, Japan 13 September 2025 – 21 September 2025
- Competitors: 59 (28 men and 31 women)
- Medals Ranked 3rd: Gold 3 Silver 1 Bronze 1 Total 5

World Athletics Championships appearances (overview)
- 1976; 1980; 1983; 1987; 1991; 1993; 1995; 1997; 1999; 2001; 2003; 2005; 2007; 2009; 2011; 2013; 2015; 2017; 2019; 2022; 2023; 2025

Canada competed at the 2025 World Athletics Championships in Tokyo, Japan, from 13 to 21 September 2025.

== Medallists ==
Medal	Athlete	Event	Date
Gold	Evan Dunfee	Men's 35 kilometres walk	September 13
Gold	Camryn Rogers	Women's hammer throw	September 15
Gold	Ethan Katzberg	Men's hammer throw	September 16
Silver	Aaron Brown; Jerome Blake; Brendon Rodney; Andre De Grasse	Men's 4 × 100 metres relay	September 21
Bronze	Marco Arop	Men's 800 metres	September 20

== Results ==
Canada entered 59 athletes to the championships: 28 men and 31 women.

Key

- Q = Qualified for the next round
- q = Qualified for the next round as a fastest loser or, in field events, by position without achieving the qualifying target
- NR = National record
- PB = Personal best
- SB = Season best
- N/A = Round not applicable for the event

=== Men ===
Track and road events

Athlete	Event	Heat		Semifinal		Final	
Athlete	Event	Result	Rank	Result	Rank	Result	Rank
Jerome Blake	100 metres	10.05	2 Q	10.03	3	Did not advance	
Andre De Grasse	100 metres	10.16	2 Q	10.09	5	Did not advance	
Eliezer Adjibi	100 metres	10.19	2 Q	10.27	8	Did not advance	
Jerome Blake	200 metres	20.43	5 q	20.41	5	Did not advance	
Aaron Brown	200 metres	20.33	5 q	20.59	8	Did not advance	
Andre De Grasse	200 metres	20.30	4 q	20.13	6	Did not advance	
Christopher Morales Williams	400 metres	45.26	6	Did not advance			
Marco Arop	800 metres	1:45.39	3 Q	1:45.09	1 Q	1:41.95 SB	3rd place, bronze medalist(s)
Matthew Erickson	800 metres	1:48.49	8	Did not advance			
Abdullahi Hassan	800 metres	1:47.50	8	Did not advance			
Justin O'Toole	800 metres	1:48.88	9	Did not advance			
Kieran Lumb	1500 metres	3:55.04	15	Did not advance			
Foster Malleck	1500 metres	3:41.53	6 Q	4:14.09	10	Did not advance	
Charles Philibert-Thiboutot	1500 metres	3:44.82	12	Did not advance			
Mohammed Ahmed	10,000 metres	—N/a				Did not finish	
Jean-Simon Desgagnés	3000 metres steeplechase	8:36.58	10 qR	—N/a		8:39.96	13
Justin Kent	Marathon	—N/a				2:17.12	35
Cameron Levins	Marathon	—N/a				2:11:07 SB	12
Ben Preisner	Marathon	—N/a				2:17:32	36
Evan Dunfee	35 km racewalk	—N/a				2:28:22	1st place, gold medalist(s)
Jerome Blake; Aaron Brown; Andre De Grasse; Brendon Rodney	4 × 100 metres relay	37.85	1 Q	—N/a		37.55 SB	2nd place, silver medalist(s)

Field events

Athlete	Event	Qualification		Final	
Athlete	Event	Distance	Position	Distance	Position
Rowan Hamilton	Hammer throw	75.38	16	Did not advance	
Ethan Katzberg	Hammer throw	81.85	1 Q	84.70 CR	1st place, gold medalist(s)

Combined events – Decathlon

Athlete	Event	100 m	LJ	SP	HJ	400 m	110H	DT	PV	JT	1500 m	Final	Rank
Pierce LePage	Result	10.84	6.92	14.87	1.96	DNS	—N/a					DNF	
Pierce LePage	Points	897	795	782	767	DNS	—N/a					DNF	
Damian Warner	Result	DNS											

=== Women ===
Track and road events

Athlete	Event	Heat		Semifinal		Final	
Athlete	Event	Result	Rank	Result	Rank	Result	Rank
Audrey Leduc	100 metres	11.26	3 Q	11.34	8	Did not advance	
Sade McCreath	100 metres	11.41	4	Did not advance			
Audrey Leduc	200 metres	22.82	4 q	22.90	5	Did not advance	
Jacqueline Madogo	200 metres	23.23	6	Did not advance			
Lauren Gale	400 metres	51.56	4	Did not advance			
Dianna Proctor	400 metres	51.98	7	Did not advance			
Zoe Sherar	400 metres	52.19	6	Did not advance			
Jazz Shukla	800 metres	2:01.42	6	Did not advance			
Maeliss Trapeau	800 metres	2:00.38	3 Q	1:58.90 PB	6	Did not advance	
Kate Current	1500 metres	4:07.52	10	Did not advance			
Gabriela DeBues-Stafford	1500 metres	4:02.00	4 Q	4:08.29	5 Q	3:59.65 SB	11
Lucia Stafford	1500 metres	4:08.98	7	Did not advance			
Gabriela DeBues-Stafford	5000 metres	15:04.30	12	—N/a		Did not advance	
Regan Yee	5000 metres	15:12.30	14	—N/a		Did not advance	
Mariam Abdul-Rashid	100 metres hurdles	13.02	5	Did not advance			
Tatiana Aholou	100 metres hurdles	13.21	6	Did not advance			
Savannah Sutherland	400 metres hurdles	55.68	5	Did not advance			
Grace Fetherstonhaugh	3000 metres steeplechase	9:32.09	8	—N/a		Did not advance	
Natasha Wodak	Marathon	—N/a				2:36:02 SB	31
Olivia Lundman	35 km racewalk	—N/a				DQ	
Marie-Éloïse Leclair; Audrey Leduc; Jacqueline Madogo; Sade McCreath	4 × 100 metres relay	42.38	4 q NR	—N/a		42.82	7
Lauren Gale; Alyssa Marsh; Dianna Proctor; Zoe Sherar	4 × 400 metres relay	3:26.33 SB	5	—N/a		Did not advance	

Field events

Athlete	Event	Qualification		Final	
Athlete	Event	Distance	Position	Distance	Position
Jennifer Elizarov	Pole vault	NM	N/A	Did not advance	
Sarah Mitton	Shot put	19.20	5 Q	19.81	4
Julia Tunks	Discus throw	59.61	19	Did not advance	
Camryn Rogers	Hammer throw	77.52	1 Q	80.51 AR, WL	1st place, gold medalist(s)
Jillian Weir	Hammer throw	67.98	26	Did not advance	

=== Mixed ===
Track events

Athlete	Event	Heat		Final	
Athlete	Event	Result	Rank	Result	Rank
Austin Cole; Michael Roth; Alyssa Marsh; Jasneet Nijjar	4 × 400 metres relay	3:18.94	9	Did not advance	
