= 2025 World Athletics Championships – Women's 800 metres =

Women's 800 metres at the 2025 World Athletics Championships
- Venue: National Stadium
- Location: Tokyo, Japan
- Dates: 18 September (heats); 19 September (semi-finals); 21 September (final)
- Winning time: 1:54.62 CR

Medalists
gold medal	Lilian Odira	Kenya
silver medal	Georgia Hunter Bell	Great Britain
bronze medal	Keely Hodgkinson	Great Britain

The women's 800 metres at the 2025 World Athletics Championships was held over three rounds at the National Stadium in Tokyo, Japan, on 18, 19 and 21 September 2025.

== Background ==
Before the competition records were as follows:

Records before the 2025 World Athletics Championships
Record	Athlete (nation)	Time	Location	Date
World record	Jarmila Kratochvílová (TCH)	1:53.28	Munich, West Germany	26 July 1983
Championship record	Jarmila Kratochvílová (TCH)	1:54.68	Helsinki, Finland	9 August 1983
World leading	Keely Hodgkinson (GBR)	1:54.74	Chorzów, Poland	16 August 2025
African record	Pamela Jelimo (KEN)	1:54.01	Zurich, Switzerland	29 August 2008
Asian record	Liu Dong (CHN)	1:55.54	Beijing, China	9 September 1993
European record	Jarmila Kratochvílová (TCH)	1:53.28	Munich, West Germany	26 July 1983
North, Central American, and Caribbean record	Ana Fidelia Quirot (CUB)	1:54.44	Barcelona, Spain	9 September 1989
Oceanian record	Claudia Hollingsworth (AUS)	1:57.67	Chorzów, Poland	16 August 2025
South American record	Letitia Vriesde (SUR)	1:56.68	Gothenburg, Sweden	13 August 1995

== Qualification ==
The standard to qualify automatically for entry was 1:59.00.

== Results ==
=== Round 1 ===
The seven heats of round 1 took place on 18 September, starting in 19:58 (UTC+9). The first three athletes in each heat ( Q ) and the three fastest ( q ) qualified for the semi-finals.

==== Heat 1 ====
Place	Athlete	Nation	Time	Notes
1	Keely Hodgkinson	Great Britain & N.I.	1:59.79	Q
2	Assia Raziki	Morocco	1:59.82	Q
3	Clara Liberman	France	2:00.17	Q
4	Roisin Willis	United States	2:00.24	
5	Caroline Bredlinger	Austria	2:00.25	
6	Anita Horvat	Slovenia	2:00.66	
7	Marta Mitjans	Spain	2:00.67	
8	Déborah Rodriguez	Uruguay	2:03.18	
9	Perina Lokure Nakang	Athlete Refugee Team	2:10.13	SB

==== Heat 2 ====
Place	Athlete	Nation	Time	Notes
1	Anaïs Bourgoin	France	1:58.43	Q
2	Mary Moraa	Kenya	1:58.44	Q
3	Gabriela Gajanová	Slovakia	2:00.44	Q
4	Veronica Vancardo	Switzerland	2:01.13	
5	Rocío Arroyo	Spain	2:01.34	
6	Jazz Shukla	Canada	2:01.42	
7	Adelle Tracey	Jamaica	2:01.70	
8	Nigist Getachew	Ethiopia	2:02.42	

==== Heat 3 ====
Place	Athlete	Nation	Time	Notes
1	Tsige Duguma	Ethiopia	2:01.53	Q
2	Maggi Congdon	United States	2:01.74	Q
3	Eloisa Coiro	Italy	2:01.86	Q
4	Kelly-Ann Beckford	Jamaica	2:02.63	
5	Nelly Jepkosgei	Bahrain	2:02.79	
6	Angelika Sarna	Poland	2:02.81	
7	Rin Kubo	Japan	2:02.84	
8	Shafiqua Maloney	Saint Vincent and the Grenadines	2:03.12	

==== Heat 4 ====
Place	Athlete	Nation	Time	Notes
1	Audrey Werro	Switzerland	1:58.43	Q
2	Sage Hurta-Klecker	United States	1:58.43	Q
3	Anna Wielgosz	Poland	1:58.63	Q
4	Abbey Caldwell	Australia	1:58.71	q
5	Lorea Ibarzabal	Spain	2:00.60	
6	Sarah Moraa	Kenya	2:01.62	qJ
7	Noélie Yarigo	Benin	2:03.43	
8	Soukaina Haji	Morocco	2:06.80	

==== Heat 5 ====
Place	Athlete	Nation	Time	Notes
1	Lilian Odira	Kenya	1:57.86	Q
2	Daily Cooper Gaspar	Cuba	1:58.16	Q
3	Worknesh Mesele	Ethiopia	1:58.46	Q
4	Halimah Nakaayi	Uganda	1:58.57	q
5	Jemma Reekie	Great Britain & N.I.	1:59.35	
6	Wu Hongjiao	China	2:01.38	
7	Smilla Kolbe	Germany	2:01.74	
8	Eveliina Määttänen	Finland	2:02.55	

==== Heat 6 ====
Place	Athlete	Nation	Time	Notes
1	Georgia Hunter Bell	Great Britain & N.I.	1:58.82	Q
2	Gabija Galvydytė	Lithuania	1:58.86	Q
3	Claudia Hollingsworth	Australia	1:59.06	Q
4	Rénelle Lamote	France	1:59.32	q, SB
5	Margarita Koczanowa	Poland	1:59:37	PB
6	Lore Hoffmann	Switzerland	1:59.76	
7	Pooja Olla	India	2:01.03	PB
—	Charné du Plessis	South Africa	DNF	

==== Heat 7 ====
Place	Athlete	Nation	Time	Notes
1	Natoya Goule-Toppin	Jamaica	1:59.66	Q
2	Oratile Nowe	Botswana	2:00.09	Q
3	Maeliss Trapeau	Canada	2:00.38	Q
4	Majtie Kolberg	Germany	2:00.64	
5	Vivian Chebet Kiprotich	Kenya	2:00.68	
6	Elena Bellò	Italy	2:02.14	
7	Jessica Hull	Australia	2:13.42	qR
—	Prudence Sekgodiso	South Africa	DNF	

=== Semi-finals ===
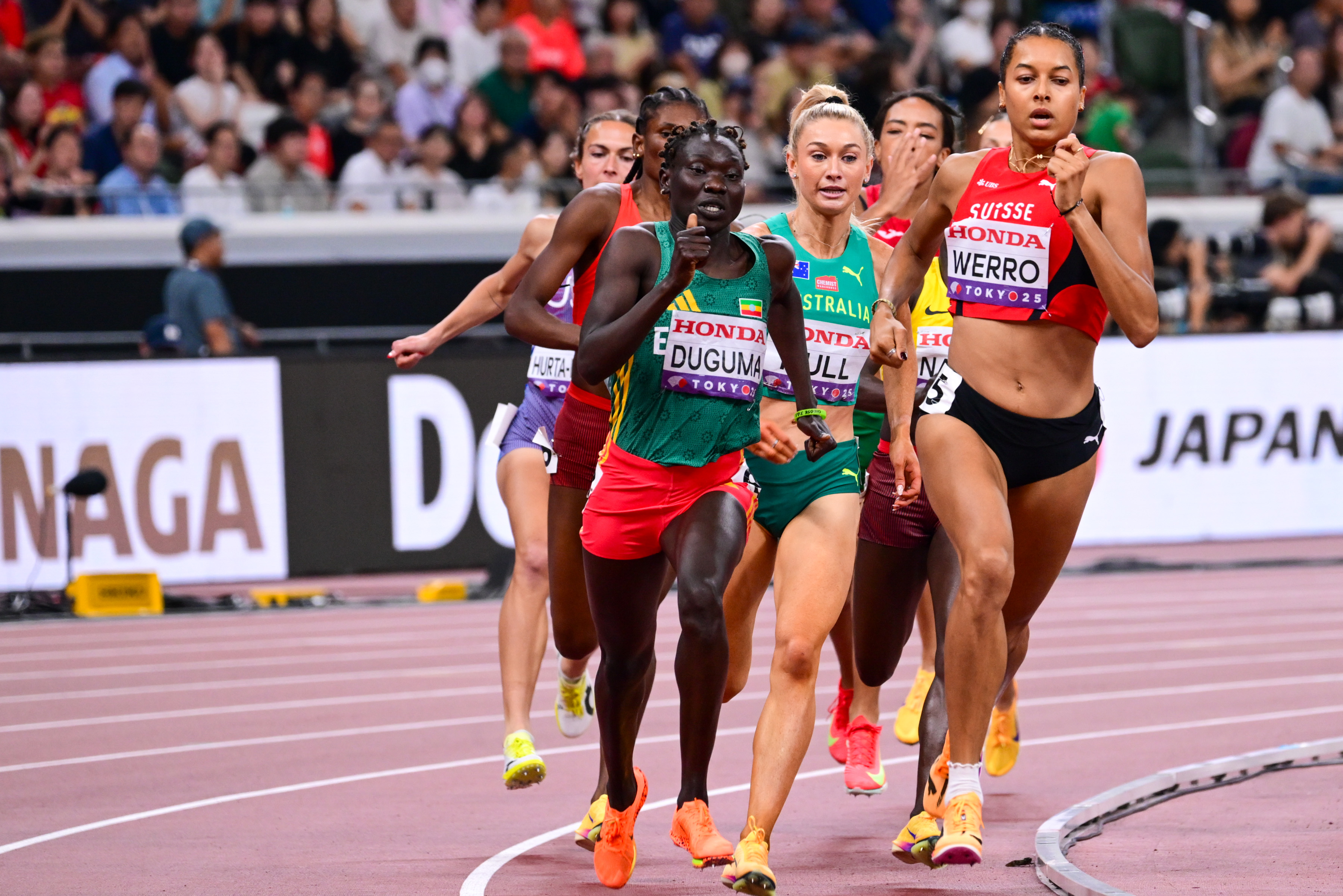
Second heat of the semi-finals

The three heats of the semi-finals took place on 19 September, starting at 20:43 (UTC+9). The first two athletes in each heat ( Q ) and the two fastest ( q ) qualified for the final.

==== Heat 1 ====
Place	Athlete	Nation	Time	Notes
1	Mary Moraa	Kenya	1:58.40	Q
2	Georgia Hunter Bell	Great Britain & N.I.	1:58.62	Q
3	Eloisa Coiro	Italy	1:59.19	
4	Claudia Hollingsworth	Australia	1:59.50	
5	Natoya Goule-Toppin	Jamaica	1:59.58	
6	Rénelle Lamote	France	1:59.94	
7	Maggi Congdon	United States	1:59.95	
8	Daily Cooper Gaspar	Cuba	2:03.00	

==== Heat 2 ====
Place	Athlete	Nation	Time	Notes
1	Lilian Odira	Kenya	1:56.85	Q
2	Audrey Werro	Switzerland	1:56.99	Q
3	Jessica Hull	Australia	1:57.15	q, AR
4	Sage Hurta-Klecker	United States	1:57.62	q, SB
5	Tsige Duguma	Ethiopia	1:57.70	
6	Halimah Nakaayi	Uganda	1:57.79	
7	Assia Raziki	Morocco	1:57.87	PB
8	Gabija Galvydytė	Lithuania	1:57.96	PB
9	Clara Liberman	France	2:04.12	

==== Heat 3 ====
Place	Athlete	Nation	Time	Notes
1	Keely Hodgkinson	Great Britain & N.I.	1:57.53	Q
2	Sarah Moraa	Kenya	1:57.53	Q, PB
3	Anaïs Bourgoin	France	1:58.00	
4	Oratile Nowe	Botswana	1:58.43	
5	Abbey Caldwell	Australia	1:58.44	
6	Maeliss Trapeau	Canada	1:58.90	PB
7	Gabriela Gajanová	Slovakia	1:59.16	
8	Anna Wielgosz	Poland	1:59.72	
9	Worknesh Mesele	Ethiopia	2:00.91	

=== Final ===
The final was held on 21 September, starting at 19:35 (UTC+9).

Results of the final
Place	Athlete	Nation	Time	Notes
1st place, gold medalist(s)	Lilian Odira	Kenya	1:54.62	CR
2nd place, silver medalist(s)	Georgia Hunter Bell	Great Britain & N.I.	1:54.90	PB
3rd place, bronze medalist(s)	Keely Hodgkinson	Great Britain & N.I.	1:54.91	
4	Sarah Moraa	Kenya	1:55.74	PB
5	Sage Hurta-Klecker	United States	1:55.89	PB
6	Audrey Werro	Switzerland	1:56.17	
7	Mary Moraa	Kenya	1:57.10	SB
8	Jessica Hull	Australia	1:57.30	
