= Sweden at the 2025 World Athletics Championships =

- Flag of Sweden
- WA code: SWE

in Tokyo, Japan 13 September 2025 – 21 September 2025
- Competitors: 35 (17 men and 18 women)
- Medals Ranked 5th: Gold 2 Silver 0 Bronze 1 Total 3

World Athletics Championships appearances (overview)
- 1976; 1980; 1983; 1987; 1991; 1993; 1995; 1997; 1999; 2001; 2003; 2005; 2007; 2009; 2011; 2013; 2015; 2017; 2019; 2022; 2023; 2025

Sweden competed at the 2025 World Athletics Championships in Tokyo, Japan, from 13 to 21 September 2025.

== Medallists ==
Medal	Name	Event	Date
Gold	Armand Duplantis	Men's pole vault	15 September
Gold	Daniel Ståhl	Men's discus throw	21 September
Bronze	Andreas Almgren	Men's 10,000 metres	14 September

== Results ==
Sweden entered 35 athletes to the championships: 18 women and 17 men.

Key

- Q = Qualified for the next round
- q = Qualified for the next round as a fastest loser or, in field events, by position without achieving the qualifying target
- NR = National record
- PB = Personal best
- SB = Season best
- N/A = Round not applicable for the event

=== Men ===
Track and road events

Athlete	Event	Heat		Semifinal		Final	
Athlete	Event	Result	Rank	Result	Rank	Result	Rank
Henrik Larsson	100 metres	10.22	4	Did not advance			
Henrik Larsson	200 metres	20.40	4	20.32 PB	8	Did not advance	
Andreas Kramer	800 metres	1:46.84	8	Did not advance			
Samuel Pihlström	1500 metres	3:37.25	5 Q	3:35.71	6 Q	3:35.74	11
Andreas Almgren	5000 metres	13:16.38	9	—N/a		Did not advance	
Andreas Almgren	10,000 metres	—N/a				28:56.02	3rd place, bronze medalist(s)
Ebba Tulu Chala	Marathon	—N/a				2:14:40	25
Suldan Hassan	Marathon	—N/a				2:11:18	14
Carl Bengtström	400 metres hurdles	49.74	7	Did not advance			
Oskar Edlund	400 metres hurdles	48.52 PB	6 q	48.81	7	Did not advance	
Vidar Johansson	3000 metres steeplechase	8:31.31	6	—N/a		Did not advance	
Leo Magnusson	3000 metres steeplechase	8:31.66	8	—N/a		Did not advance	
Perseus Karlström	20 kilometres walk	—N/a				1:20:37	13
Perseus Karlström	35 kilometres walk	—N/a				2:37:47	19

Field events

Athlete	Event	Qualification		Final	
Athlete	Event	Distance	Position	Distance	Position
Armand Duplantis	Pole vault	5.75	1 q	6.30 WR	1st place, gold medalist(s)
Thobias Montler	Long jump	8.11	6 q	8.17	7
Jesper Arbinge	Shot put	19.03	29	Did not advance	
Wictor Petersson	Shot put	21.14	4 q	20.35	11
Daniel Ståhl	Discus throw	69.90	1 Q	70.47 SB	1st place, gold medalist(s)
Ragnar Carlsson	Hammer throw	72.51	29	Did not advance	

=== Women ===
Track and road events

Athlete	Event	Heat		Semifinal		Final	
Athlete	Event	Result	Rank	Result	Rank	Result	Rank
Julia Henriksson	100 metres	11.49	7	Did not advance			
Julia Henriksson	200 metres	22.86	4 q	22.93	7	Did not advance	
Nora Lindahl	200 metres	23,35	7	Did not advance			
Mia Barnett	1500 metres	4:16.71	13	Did not advance			
Wilma Nielsen	1500 metres	4:13.98	12	Did not advance			
Vera Sjöberg	1500 metres	4:06.01	7	Did not advance			
Sarah Lahti	5000 metres	15:05.13	10	—N/a		Did not advance	
Moa Granat	400 metres hurdles	56.32	8	Did not advance			

Field events

Athlete	Event	Qualification		Final	
Athlete	Event	Distance	Position	Distance	Position
Ellen Ekholm	High jump	NM		Did not advance	
Engla Nilsson	High jump	1.88	19	Did not advance	
Kajsa Roth	Pole vault	4.45 PB	17	Did not advance	
Maja Åskag	Long jump	6.61	11 q	6.49	9
Khaddi Sagnia	Long jump	6.68	17	Did not advance	
Maja Åskag	Triple jump	14,15	10 q	13,92	11
Axelina Johansson	Shot put	18.29	13	Did not advance	
Sara Lennman	Shot put	18.38	12 q	17.78	12
Fanny Roos	Shot put	19.24	4 Q	19.54	5
Vanessa Kamga	Discus throw	63.50	8 q	66.61 NR	4
Caisa-Marie Lindfors	Discus throw	58.06	26	Did not advance	
Rebecka Hallerth	Hammer throw	70.43 SB	14	Did not advance	
