= 2025 World Athletics Championships – Men's 10,000 metres =

Men's 10,000 metres at the 2025 World Athletics Championships
- Venue: National Stadium
- Location: Tokyo, Japan
- Dates: 14 September
- Competitors: 25 from 16 nations
- Winning time: 28:55.77

Medalists
gold medal	Jimmy Gressier	France
silver medal	Yomif Kejelcha	Ethiopia
bronze medal	Andreas Almgren	Sweden

The men's 10,000 metres at the 2025 World Athletics Championships was held at the National Stadium in Tokyo on 14 September 2025.

== Records ==
Before the competition records were as follows:

Record	Athlete & Nat.	Perf.	Location	Date
World record	Joshua Cheptegei (UGA)	26:11.00	Valencia, Spain	7 October 2020
Championship record	Kenenisa Bekele (ETH)	26:46.31	Berlin, Germany	17 August 2009
World Leading	Biniam Mehary (ETH)	26:43.82	Eugene, United States	5 July 2025
African Record	Joshua Cheptegei (UGA)	26:11.00	Valencia, Spain	7 October 2020
Asian Record	Ahmad Hassan Abdullah (QAT)	26:38.76	Brussels, Belgium	5 September 2003
European Record	Mo Farah (GBR)	26:46.57	Eugene, United States	3 June 2011
North, Central American and Caribbean record	Grant Fisher (USA)	26:33.84	San Juan Capistrano, United States	6 March 2022
Oceanian record	Jack Rayner (AUS)	27:09.57	San Juan Capistrano, United States	16 March 2024
South American Record	Marilson Gomes dos Santos (BRA)	27:28.12	Neerpelt, Belgium	2 June 2007

== Qualification standard ==
The standard to qualify automatically for entry was 27:00.00.

== Schedule ==
The event schedule, in local time (UTC+9), was as follows:

Date	Time	Round
14 September	21:30	Final

== Final ==
Place	Athlete	Nation	Time	Notes
1st place, gold medalist(s)	Jimmy Gressier	France	28:55.77	SB
2nd place, silver medalist(s)	Yomif Kejelcha	Ethiopia	28:55.83	SB
3rd place, bronze medalist(s)	Andreas Almgren	Sweden	28:56.02	
4	Ishmael Kipkurui	Kenya	28:56.48	
5	Nico Young	United States	28:56.62	SB
6	Selemon Barega	Ethiopia	28:57.21	
7	Edwin Kurgat	Kenya	28:57.83	
8	Grant Fisher	United States	28:57.85	SB
9	Thierry Ndikumwenayo	Spain	28:59.07	SB
10	Adriaan Wildschutt	South Africa	28:59.47	
11	Graham Blanks	United States	29:01.27	
12	Berihu Aregawi	Ethiopia	29:02.02	
13	Dan Kibet	Uganda	29:03.22	
14	Dominic Lobalu	Switzerland	29:11.65	SB
15	Egide Ntakarutimana	Burundi	29:12.81	
16	Gulveer Singh	India	29:13.33	
17	Awet Nftalem Kibrab	Norway	29:19.91	
18	Oscar Chelimo	Uganda	29:26.66	PB
19	Efrem Gidey	Ireland	29:30.37	
20	Mebuki Suzuki	Japan	29:33.60	
21	Célestin Ndikumana	Burundi	29:38.86	
22	Jun Kasai	Japan	29:41.84	
23	Aaron Bienenfeld	Germany	29:51.41	
—	Benson Kiplangat	Kenya	DNF	
—	Mohammed Ahmed	Canada	DNF	
—	Merhawi Mebrahtu	Eritrea	DNS	
—	Ignacio Velásquez	Chile	DNS	
