= Kana Kobayashi (runner) =

Japanese long-distance runner

Personal information
- Native name: 小林 香菜
- Nationality: Japan
- Born: April 4, 2001 (age 25) Japan
- Education: Waseda University

Sport
- Sport: Long-distance running
- Events: Marathon, Half marathon, 10,000 metres

Kana Kobayashi (小林 香菜 (Kobayashi Kana, born 4 April 2001)) is a Japanese long-distance runner who competes primarily in the marathon. As of October 2025, all of her races have taken place in Japan.

== Career ==
Kobayashi attended Waseda University where she was a member of the running club, graduating from the Faculty of Law.

In 2024, Kobayashi won the Hofu Yomiuri Marathon with a time of 2:24:59, setting a new course record. She came second at the Osaka Women's Marathon in 2025 in a time of 2:21:19.

Her career highlight came in September 2025 at the women's marathon at the 2025 World Athletics Championships in Tokyo. She placed seventh in the event, running a time of 2:28:50.

== Personal bests ==
Outdoor

Personal Bests
Event	Result (h:m:s)	Date	Location
Marathon	2:21:19	26 January 2025	Osaka, Japan
Half Marathon	1:09:09	27 April 2025	Japan
10,000 metres	32:22.98	21 September 2024	Japan

== Competition record ==
International and National Competition Results
Year	Competition	Location	Position	Event	Time
2024	Hofu Yomiuri Marathon	Hōfu, Japan	1st	Marathon	2:24:59
2025	Osaka International Women's Marathon	Osaka, Japan	2nd	Marathon	2:21:19
2025	2025 World Athletics Championships	Tokyo, Japan	7th	Marathon	2:28:50
