= Kennedy Kimutai =

Kenyan long-distance runner (born 1999)

Personal information
- Born: 3 June 1999 (age 27)

Sport
- Country: Kenya
- Sport: Long-distance running
- Events: Marathon, Half marathon

Achievements and titles
- Personal bests: Half marathon: 2:05:27 (Valencia 2025); Marathon: 2:05:27 (Rotterdam 2025)

Kennedy Kimutai (born 3 June 1999) is a Kenyan long-distance runner who represented Kenya at the 2025 World Athletics Championships in the Marathon. In 2024, he made his debut in the marathon at the Daegu Marathon where he came in second. He won the Paris Half Marathon in 2025 and successfully defended that title in 2026.
