= Abel Chelangat =

Ugandan long-distance runner

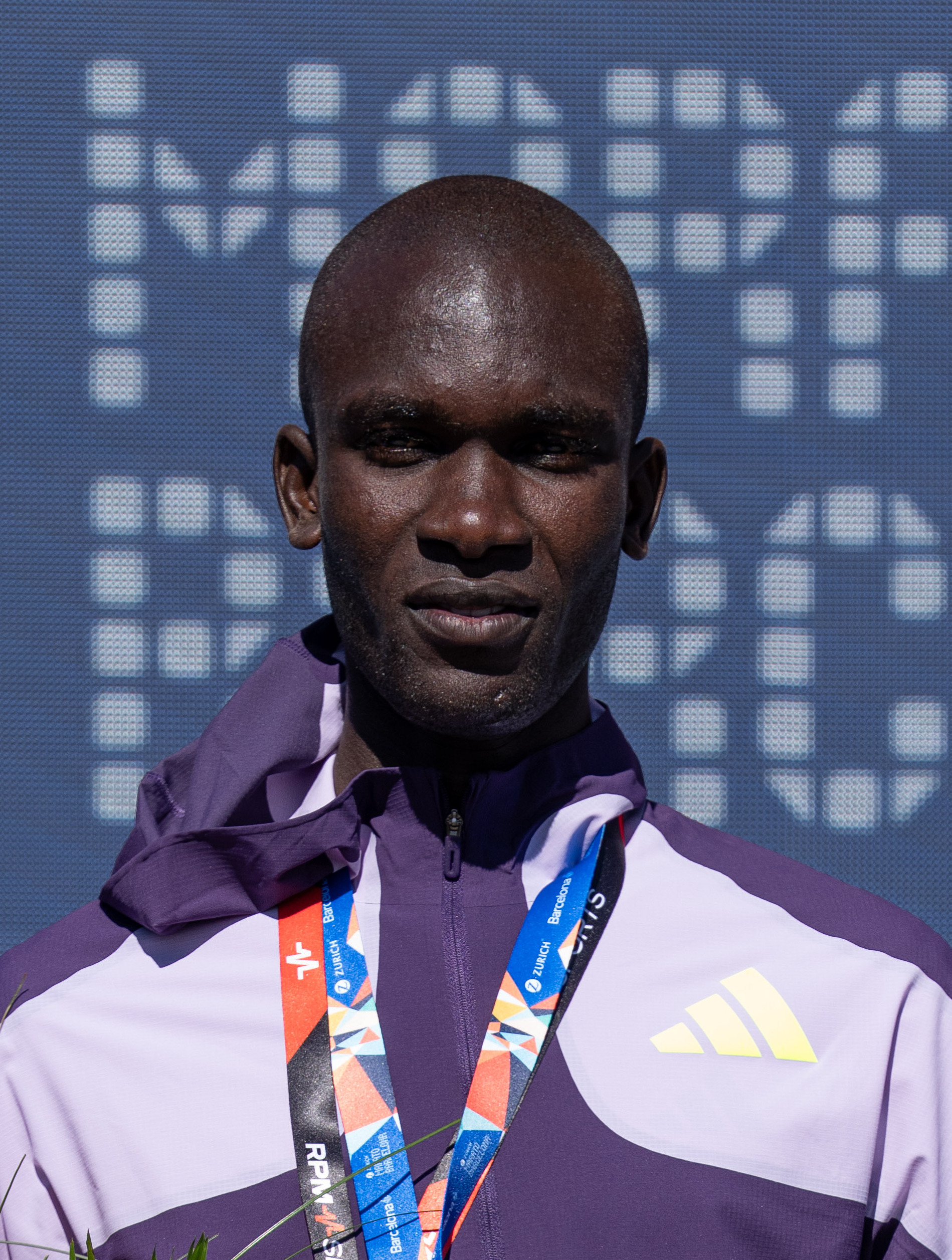
- #1 on the podium of the Barcelona Marathon 2026

Personal information
- Born: 7 July 1993 (age 32)

Sport
- Country: Uganda
- Sport: Long-distance running
- Event: Marathon

Achievements and titles
- Personal best: Marathon: 2:04:59 (Barcelona 2026)

Abel Chelangat (born 7 July 1993) is a Ugandan long-distance runner who represented Uganda at the 2025 World Athletics Championships in the Marathon.

== Career ==
In 2024, he was scouted by representatives from Adidas and received an invite to the Porto Marathon in Porto, Portugal which he ended up winning.

In 2025 he won the Rabat Marathon in Rabat, Morocco and was then selected to represent Uganda at the 2025 World Athletics Championships in Tokyo. He ended up placing 5th in the final.

He won the 47th edition of the Barcelona Marathon, held on March 15, 2026, with a time of 2:04:59.
