= Oqbe Kibrom Ruesom =

Eritrean long-distance runner

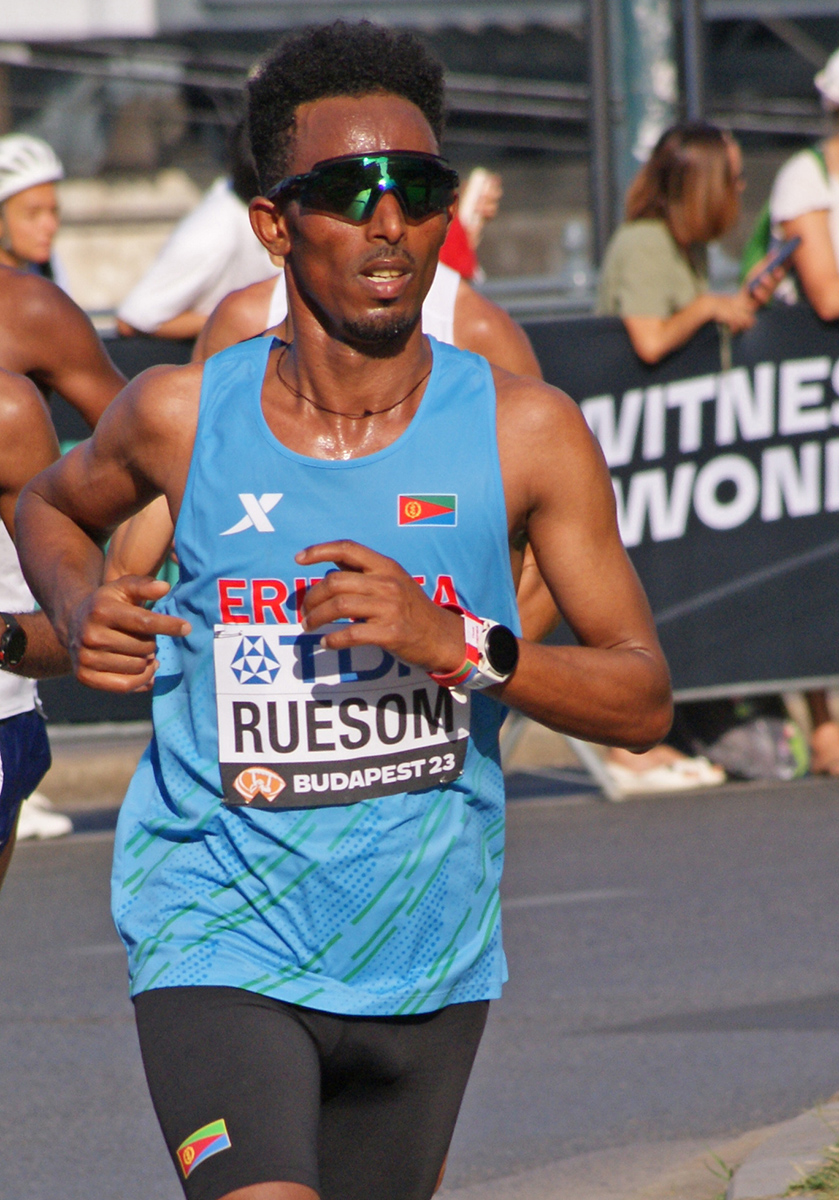

Personal information
- Nationality: Eritrean
- Born: 1 January 1998 (age 28)

Sport
- Sport: Athletics
- Event: Long-distance running

Oqbe Kibrom Ruesom (born 1 January 1998) is an Eritrean long-distance runner. He qualified to represent Eritrea at the 2020 Summer Olympics in Tokyo 2021, competing in men's marathon.
