= Ireland at the 2009 World Championships in Athletics =

- WA code: IRL
- National federation: Athletics Ireland
- Website: www.athleticsireland.ie

in Berlin
- Competitors: 14
- Medals: Gold 1 Silver 0 Bronze 0 Total 1

World Championships in Athletics appearances
- 1980; 1983; 1987; 1991; 1993; 1995; 1997; 1999; 2001; 2003; 2005; 2007; 2009; 2011; 2013; 2015; 2017; 2019; 2022; 2023; 2025

Ireland competed at the 2009 World Championships in Athletics from 15 to 23 August 2009. A team of 14 athletes was announced in preparation for the competition. Selected athletes achieved one of the competition's qualifying standards. The team included European medallists Derval O'Rourke and David Gillick, and 2008 Olympic finalists Eileen O'Keeffe, Rob Heffernan and Roisin McGettigan. Olive Loughnane was Ireland's only medalist, winning silver in the women's 20 km walk. In March 2016, she was upgraded to gold medalist and world champion after the original winner of the race, Russia's Olga Kaniskina was retrospectively disqualified for doping.

== Team selection ==
Track and road events

Event	Athletes	
Event	Men	Women
200 metres	Paul Hession	
400 metres	David Gillick	
800 metres	Thomas Chamney	
1500 metres	Thomas Chamney	Deirdre Byrne
5000 metres	Alistair Cragg	
100 metres hurdles	—	Derval O'Rourke
400 metres hurdles		Michelle Carey
3000 m steeplechase		Roisin McGettigan
20 km race walk	Robert Heffernan	Olive Loughnane
50 km race walk	Jamie Costin; Colin Griffin	—

Field and combined events

Event	Athletes	
Event	Men	Women
High jump		Deirdre Ryan
Hammer throw		Eileen O'Keefe

== Results ==
=== Men ===
Track and road events

Event	Athletes	Heat Round 1		Heat Round 2		Semifinal		Final	
Event	Athletes	Result	Rank	Result	Rank	Result	Rank	Result	Rank
200 m	Paul Hession	20.66 Q	5	20.48 Q	7	20.48	11	did not advance	
400 m	David Gillick	45.54 Q	12	-		44.88 q	6	45.53	6
800 m	Thomas Chamney	1:48.09	28	-		did not advance			
1500 m	Thomas Chamney	3:42.54	18	did not advance					
5000 m	Alistair Cragg	13:46.34	27	-				did not advance	
20 km walk	Robert Heffernan	-						1:22.09 SB	15
50 km walk	Jamie Costin	-						DNF	
50 km walk	Colin Griffin	-						DNF	

=== Women ===
Track and road events

Event	Athletes	Heat Round 1		Heat Round 2		Semifinal		Final	
Event	Athletes	Result	Rank	Result	Rank	Result	Rank	Result	Rank
1500 m	Deirdre Byrne	4:12.19	31	did not advance					
100 m hurdles	Derval O'Rourke	12.86 SB Q	10	-		12.73 SB q	7	12.67 NR	4
400 m hurdles	Michelle Carey	56.91	25	did not advance					
3000 m steeplechase	Roisin McGettigan	9:59.10	13	did not advance					
20 km walk	Olive Loughnane							1:28.56 SB	Gold medal

Field and combined events

Event	Athletes	Qualification		Final	
Event	Athletes	Result	Rank	Result	Rank
High jump	Deirdre Ryan	1.85m	31	did not advance	
Hammer throw	Eileen O'Keefe	63.20	35	did not advance	
