= Ireland at the 2023 World Athletics Championships =

- Flag of Ireland
- WA code: IRL

in Budapest, Hungary 19 August 2023 – 27 August 2023
- Competitors: 24 (12 men and 12 women)
- Medals: Gold 0 Silver 0 Bronze 0 Total 0

World Athletics Championships appearances
- 1980; 1983; 1987; 1991; 1993; 1995; 1997; 1999; 2001; 2003; 2005; 2007; 2009; 2011; 2013; 2015; 2017; 2019; 2022; 2023; 2025

Ireland competed at the 2023 World Athletics Championships in Budapest, Hungary, from 19 to 27 August 2023. The team won no medals, but two athletes (Rhasidat Adeleke in the women's 400 metres and Ciara Mageean in the women's 1500) achieved fourth-place finishes.

== Results ==
Ireland entered 24 athletes.

=== Men ===
Track and road events

Athlete	Event	Heat		Semifinal		Final	
Athlete	Event	Result	Rank	Result	Rank	Result	Rank
Christopher O'Donnell	400 metres	46.76	7	Did not advance			
Mark English	800 metres	1:45.71 SB	4 q	1:45.14 SB	7	Did not advance	
John Fitzsimons	800 metres	1:48.20	5	Did not advance			
Andrew Coscoran	1500 metres	3:34.75	6 Q	3:37.39	14	Did not advance	
Nick Griggs	1500 metres	3:40.72	12	Did not advance			
Luke McCann	1500 metres	3:47.48	10	Did not advance			
Brian Fay	5000 metres	13:42.86	16	—N/a		Did not advance	
David Kenny	20 kilometres walk	—N/a				DNF	
Brendan Boyce	35 kilometres walk	—N/a				2:37:26	24

Field events

Athlete	Event	Qualification		Final	
Athlete	Event	Distance	Position	Distance	Position
Eric Favors	Shot put	19.65	23	Did not advance	

=== Women ===
Track and road events

Athlete	Event	Heat		Semifinal		Final	
Athlete	Event	Result	Rank	Result	Rank	Result	Rank
Rhasidat Adeleke	400 metres	50.80	1 Q	49.87	2 Q	50.13	4
Sharlene Mawdsley	400 metres	51.17 PB	4 q	51.78	7	Did not advance	
Louise Shanahan	800 metres	2:00.66	5	Did not advance			
Sarah Healy	1500 metres	4:03.00	3 Q	3:59.68 PB	8	Did not advance	
Ciara Mageean	1500 metres	4:03.52	3 Q	4:02.70	3 Q	3:56.61 NR	4
Sophie O'Sullivan	1500 metres	4:02.15 PB	8	Did not advance			
Sarah Lavin	100 metres hurdles	12.69	3 Q	12.62 NR	5	Did not advance	
Sophie Becker; Róisín Harrison; Sharlene Mawdsley; Kelly McGrory	4 × 400 metres relay	3:26.18 SB	4 q	—N/a		3:27.08	8

Combined events – Heptathlon

Athlete	Event	100H	HJ	SP	200 m	LJ	JT	800 m	Final	Rank
Kate O'Connor	Result	13.57	1.80	13.47	24.78	5.74	46.07	2:14.06	6145	13
Kate O'Connor	Points	1040	978	759	907	771	784	906	6145	13

=== Mixed ===
Track events

Athlete	Event	Heat		Final	
Athlete	Event	Result	Rank	Result	Rank
Sophie Becker; Sharlene Mawdsley; Christopher O'Donnell; Jack Raftery	4 × 400 metres relay	3:13.90 SB	8 q	3:14.13	6
