= Ireland at the 2011 World Championships in Athletics =

- WA code: IRL
- National federation: Athletics Ireland
- Website: www.athleticsireland.ie

in Daegu
- Competitors: 16
- Medals: Gold 0 Silver 0 Bronze 0 Total 0

World Championships in Athletics appearances
- 1980; 1983; 1987; 1991; 1993; 1995; 1997; 1999; 2001; 2003; 2005; 2007; 2009; 2011; 2013; 2015; 2017; 2019; 2022; 2023; 2025

Ireland competed at the 2011 World Championships in Athletics from August 27 to September 4 in Daegu, South Korea.

== Team selection ==
A team of 17 athletes was announced to represent the country in the event, although just before the event began Robert Heffernan pulled out following the death of his mother. The team was led by race walker Olive Loughnane and sprinter Paul Hession.

The following athletes appeared on the preliminary Entry List, but not on the Official Start List of the specific event, resulting in a total number of 16 competitors:

KEY:	Did not participate	Competed in another event

	Event	Athlete
Men	20 kilometres walk	Robert Heffernan
Women	4 x 400 metres relay	Jessie Barr

== Results ==
=== Men ===
Event	Athletes	Heat Round 1		Heat Round 2		Semifinal		Final	
Event	Athletes	Result	Rank	Result	Rank	Result	Rank	Result	Rank
100 metres	Jason Smyth	10.57	36	Did not advance					
200 metres	Paul Hession	21.02	35	Did not advance					
1500 metres	Ciaran O'Lionaird	3:40.41 Q	14	-		3:36.96 q	6	3:37.81	10
5000 metres	Alistair Ian Cragg	13:39.36 Q	12	-				13:45.33	14
50 kilometres walk	Colin Griffin	-						DSQ	
50 kilometres walk	Robert Heffernan	-						DNS	

=== Women ===
Athlete	Event	Preliminaries		Heats		Semifinals		Final	
Athlete	Event	Time Width Height	Rank	Time Width Height	Rank	Time Width Height	Rank	Time Width Height	Rank
Joanne Cuddihy	400 metres			51.82 Q, SB	11	DSQ		Did not advance	
Derval O'Rourke	100 m hurdles			13.07	17	DNS		Did not advance	
Fionnuala Britton	3000 metres steeplechase			9:41.17	16	Did not advance			
Stephanie Reilly	3000 metres steeplechase			9:55.49	22	Did not advance			
Marian Andrews-Heffernan; Joanne Cuddihy; Claire Bergin; Michelle Carey	4 x 400 metres relay			3:27.48 NR	12			Did not advance	
Olive Loughnane	20 kilometres walk							1:34:02	16
Deirdre Ryan	High jump	1.95	7					1.93	6
Tori Pena	Pole vault	4.10	30					Did not advance	
