= Ireland at the 2007 World Championships in Athletics =

- WA code: IRL
- National federation: Athletics Ireland
- Website: www.athleticsireland.ie/content/

in Osaka
- Competitors: 15
- Medals: Gold 0 Silver 0 Bronze 0 Total 0

World Championships in Athletics appearances
- 1980; 1983; 1987; 1991; 1993; 1995; 1997; 1999; 2001; 2003; 2005; 2007; 2009; 2011; 2013; 2015; 2017; 2019; 2022; 2023; 2025

Ireland competed at the 2007 World Championships in Athletics in Osaka, Japan. The Irish team was made up of 15 athletes competing in 13 events. Despite not winning any medals, the team was thought to have performed excellently by Irish commentators. Ireland's highest placed finishers were Eileen O'Keefe in the women's hammer throw and Robert Heffernan in the men's 20K walk, both of whom finished in 6th place. Only one national record was set, by Joanne Cuddihy in the women's 400m semi-final. Despite none of them making the final, Ireland's sprinters were perhaps the most impressive performers with David Gillick, Paul Hession, Derval O'Rourke and Cuddihy all reaching the semi-finals and being ranked inside the top 16.

== Results by event ==
=== Men's competition ===
200 m

- Paul Hession
  1. Round 1 — 2nd - 20.46
  2. Round 2 — 1st - 20.50
  3. Semi Final — - 6th - 20.50 (did not advance)

400 m

- David Gillick
  1. Round 1 — 3rd - 45.35
  2. Semi Final — 6th - 45.37 (Did not advance)

800 m

- David Campbell
  1. Round 1 — 7th - 1.46.77 (Did not advance)

5,000 m

- Alistair Cragg
  1. Round 1 — 13th - 13:59.45 (Did not advance)

20K Walk

- Robert Heffernan
  1. Final — 6th - 1:23:42

50K Walk

- Colin Griffin
  1. Final — DQ
- Jamie Costin
  1. Final — DNF

=== Women's competition ===
400 m

- Joanne Cuddihy
  1. Round 1 — 3rd - 51.55
  2. Semi-Final — 50.73 (New National Record) (Did not advance)

5,000 m

- Mary Cullen
  1. Round 1 — 11th - 15:40.53 (Did not advance)

100 m Hurdles

- Derval O'Rourke
  1. Round 1 — 4th - 12.91
  2. Semi final — 8th - 12.98 (Did not advance)

3000 m Steeplechase

- Roísín McGettigan
  1. Semi-Final — 4th - 9:39.41
  2. Final — 10th - 9:39.80
- Fionnuala Britton
  1. Semi-Final — 7th - 9:42.38
  2. Final — 12th - 9:48.09

20K Walk

- Olive Loughnane
  1. Final — 17th - 1:36:00

Hammer Throw

- Eileen O'Keefe
  1. Qualifying — 5th - 71.07 m
  2. Final - 6th - 70.93 m

== Competitor summary ==
=== Men ===
200 m: Paul Hession
400 m: David Gillick
800 m: David Campbell
5,000 m: Alistair Cragg
20 km Walk: Robert Heffernan
50 km Walk: Colin Griffin and Jamie Costin

=== Women ===
100 m Hurdles: Derval O'Rourke
400 m: Joanne Cuddihy
5,000 m: Mary Cullen
3,000 m Steeplechase: Fionnuala Britton, Roisin McGettigan
20 km Walk: Olive Loughnane
Hammer Throw: Eileen O'Keeffe

Note

- David Campbell was originally selected for the 800m and 1,500m but only ran the 1,500m
- Paul Hession was selected for 100m and 200m but ran only the 200m
