= Ireland at the 2025 World Athletics Championships =

- Flag of Ireland
- WA code: IRL

in Tokyo, Japan September 13-21, 2025
- Competitors: 30 (16 men and 14 women)
- Medals Ranked 27th: Gold 0 Silver 1 Bronze 0 Total 1

World Athletics Championships appearances
- 1980; 1983; 1987; 1991; 1993; 1995; 1997; 1999; 2001; 2003; 2005; 2007; 2009; 2011; 2013; 2015; 2017; 2019; 2022; 2023; 2025

Ireland competed at the 2025 World Athletics Championships in Tokyo, Japan, from 13 to 21 September 2025.

Kate O'Connor, who took silver in the heptathlon, was the only medallist.

== Medallists ==
| Medal | Name | Event | Date |
|---|---|---|---|
| Silver | Kate O'Connor | Women's heptathlon | 20 September |

== Results ==
Ireland entered 28 athletes to the championships: 16 men and 12 women.

Key

- Q = Qualified for the next round
- q = Qualified for the next round as a fastest loser or, in field events, by position without achieving the qualifying target
- NR = National record
- PB = Personal best
- SB = Season best
- DNF = Did not finish
- N/A = Round not applicable for the event

=== Men ===
Track and road events

| Athlete | Event | Heat | | Semifinal | | Final | |
| Athlete | Event | Result | Rank | Result | Rank | Result | Rank |
|---|---|---|---|---|---|---|---|
| Mark English | 800 metres | 1:45.13 | 3 Q | 1:45.47 | 3 | Did not advance | |
| Cian McPhillips | 800 metres | 1:44.91 | 1 Q | 1:43.18 NR | 1 Q | 1:42.15 NR | 4 |
| Andrew Coscoran | 1500 metres | 3:37.32 | 6 Q | 3:35.65 | 5 Q | 3:35.87 | 12 |
| Cathal Doyle | 1500 metres | 3:42.60 | 12 | Did not advance | | | |
| Andrew Coscoran | 5000 metres | 13:56.95 | 19 | —N/a | | Did not advance | |
| Brian Fay | 5000 metres | 13:31.12 | 17 | —N/a | | Did not advance | |
| Darragh McElhinney | 5000 metres | 13:42.56 | 10 | —N/a | | Did not advance | |
| Efrem Gidey | 10,000 metres | —N/a | | | | 29:30.37 | 19 |
| Hiko Tonosa Haso | Marathon | —N/a | | | | DNF | |
| Peter Lynch | Marathon | —N/a | | | | 2:14:12 | 24 |
| David Kenny | 20 km race walk | —N/a | | | | DNS | |
| Oisin Lane | 35 km race walk | —N/a | | | | 2:41:36 | 28 |

Field events

| Athlete | Event | Qualification | | Final | |
| Athlete | Event | Distance | Position | Distance | Position |
|---|---|---|---|---|---|
| Eric Favors | Shot put | 19.19 | 17 | Did not advance | |

=== Women ===
Track and road events

| Athlete | Event | Heat | | Semifinal | | Final | |
| Athlete | Event | Result | Rank | Result | Rank | Result | Rank |
|---|---|---|---|---|---|---|---|
| Sophie Becker | 400 metres | 52.19 | 6 | Did not advance | | | |
| Sharlene Mawdsley | 400 metres | 51.04 | 4 q | 51.22 | 8 | Did not advance | |
| Sarah Healy | 1500 metres | 4:02.67 | 3 Q | 4:08.78 | 6 Q | 3:59.14 | 10 |
| Laura Nicholson | 1500 metres | 4:14.12 | 13 | Did not advance | | | |
| Sophie O'Sullivan | 1500 metres | 4:02.12 SB | 6 Q | 4:18.18 | 12 | Did not advance | |
| Fionnuala McCormack | Marathon | —N/a | | | | 2:30:16 SB | 9 |
| Sarah Lavin | 100 metres hurdles | 12.94 | 3 Q | 12.86 | 4 | Did not advance | |
| Sophie Becker; Cliodhna Manning; Sharlene Mawdsley; Rachel McCann | 4 × 400 metres relay | 3:29.27 | 8 | —N/a | | Did not advance | |

Field events

| Athlete | Event | Qualification | | Final | |
| Athlete | Event | Distance | Position | Distance | Position |
|---|---|---|---|---|---|
| Nicola Tuthill | Hammer throw | 70.70 | 6 q | 69.49 | 11 |

Combined events – Heptathlon

| Athlete | Event | 100H | HJ | SP | 200 m | LJ | JT | 800 m | Final | Rank |
|---|---|---|---|---|---|---|---|---|---|---|
| Kate O'Connor | Result | 13.44 PB | 1.86 PB | 14.37 | 24.07 PB | 6.22 | 53.06 PB | 2:09.56 PB | 6714 NR | Silver medal |
| Kate O'Connor | Points | 1059 | 1054 | 819 | 974 | 918 | 919 | 971 | 6714 NR | Silver medal |

=== Mixed ===
| Athlete | Event | Heat | | Final | |
| Athlete | Event | Result | Rank | Result | Rank |
|---|---|---|---|---|---|
| Sophie Becker (W); Conor Kelly (M); Sharlene Mawdsley (W); Jack Raftery (M) | 4 × 400 metres relay | 3:13.59 | 6 | Did not advance | |
