= Ireland at the 2015 World Championships in Athletics =

- WA code: IRL
- National federation: Athletics Ireland
- Website: www.athleticsireland.ie

in Beijing
- Competitors: 16
- Medals: Gold 0 Silver 0 Bronze 0 Total 0

World Championships in Athletics appearances
- 1980; 1983; 1987; 1991; 1993; 1995; 1997; 1999; 2001; 2003; 2005; 2007; 2009; 2011; 2013; 2015; 2017; 2019; 2022; 2023; 2025

Ireland competed at the 2015 World Championships in Athletics in Beijing, China, from 22 to 30 August 2015.

== Results ==
(q – qualified, NM – no mark, SB – season best)

=== Men ===
Track and road events

Athlete	Event	Heat		Semifinal		Final	
Athlete	Event	Result	Rank	Result	Rank	Result	Rank
Mark English	800 metres	1:46.69	12 q	1:45.55	8	did not advance	
Ben Reynolds	110 metres hurdles	13.72	29	did not advance			
Thomas Barr	400 metres hurdles	49.20	18 Q	48.71	11	did not advance	
Alex Wright	20 kilometres walk	—N/a				DQ	N/A
Alex Wright	50 kilometres walk	—N/a				DNF	
Robert Heffernan	50 kilometres walk	—N/a				3:44.17 SB	5
Brendan Boyce	50 kilometres walk	—N/a				DQ	
Brian Gregan; Brian Murphy; Thomas Barr; Mark English	4 × 400 metres relay	3:01.26 NR	13	—N/a		did not advance	

=== Women ===
Track and road events

Athlete	Event	Heat		Semifinal		Final	
Athlete	Event	Result	Rank	Result	Rank	Result	Rank
Kelly Proper	200 metres	23.28	32	did not advance			
Ciara Everard	800 metres	2:03.98	40	did not advance			
Kerry O'Flaherty	3000 metres steeplechase	10:05.10	39	—N/a		did not advance	
Michelle Finn	3000 metres steeplechase	9:55.27	33	—N/a		did not advance	
Sara Louise Treacy	3000 metres steeplechase	9:48.24	29	—N/a		did not advance	

Field events

Athlete	Event	Qualification		Final	
Athlete	Event	Distance	Position	Distance	Position
Tori Pena	Pole vault	4.30	20	did not advance	
