= Ireland at the 2013 World Championships in Athletics =

- WA code: IRL

in Moscow
- Competitors: 11
- Medals: Gold 1 Silver 0 Bronze 0 Total 1

World Championships in Athletics appearances
- 1980; 1983; 1987; 1991; 1993; 1995; 1997; 1999; 2001; 2003; 2005; 2007; 2009; 2011; 2013; 2015; 2017; 2019; 2022; 2023; 2025

Ireland competed at the 2013 World Championships in Athletics in Moscow, Russia, from 10–18 August 2013. A team of 11 athletes was announced to represent the country in the event.

== Medallists ==
The following Irish competitors won medals at the Championships

Medal	Name	Event	Date
Gold	Robert Heffernan	50 km walk	14 August

== Results ==
(q – qualified, NM – no mark, SB – season best)

=== Men ===
Track and road events

Athlete	Event	Preliminaries		Heats		Semifinals		Final	
Athlete	Event	Time	Rank	Time	Rank	Time	Rank	Time	Rank
Brian Gregan	400 metres			46.04 q	6	45.98	7	Did not advance	
Paul Robinson	800 metres			1:48.61	6	Did not advance			
Mark English	800 metres			1:47.08	4	Did not advance			
Paul Pollock	Marathon							2:16:42	21
Brendan Boyce	50 kilometres walk							3:54:24	25
Robert Heffernan	50 kilometres walk							3:37:56	Gold medal

=== Women ===
Track and road events

Athlete	Event	Preliminaries		Heats		Semifinals		Final	
Athlete	Event	Time	Rank	Time	Rank	Time	Rank	Time	Rank
Jennifer Carey	400 metres			52.62	5	Did not advance			
Roseanne Galligan	800 metres			2:02.05	7	Did not advance			
Maria McCambridge	Marathon							DNF	
Laura Reynolds	20 kilometres walk							1:33:39	31

Field events

Athlete	Event	Preliminaries		Final	
Athlete	Event	Width Height	Rank	Width Height	Rank
Tori Pena	Pole vault	4.30	10	Did not advance	
