= Ireland at the 2017 World Championships in Athletics =

- WA code: IRL
- Website: www.athleticsireland.ie

in London
- Competitors: 12 in 9 events
- Medals: Gold 0 Silver 0 Bronze 0 Total 0

World Championships in Athletics appearances
- 1980; 1983; 1987; 1991; 1993; 1995; 1997; 1999; 2001; 2003; 2005; 2007; 2009; 2011; 2013; 2015; 2017; 2019; 2022; 2023; 2025

Ireland competed at the 2017 World Championships in Athletics in London, United Kingdom, from 4–13 August 2017.

== Summary ==
Ireland won no medals at the 2017 championships. Olympic medallist Rob Heffernan finished 8th in the 50 km walk, while Thomas Barr, one of Ireland's main medal hopes in the 400m hurdles, could not compete in the semi-finals due to a norovirus outbreak.

== Results ==
(q – qualified, NM – no mark, SB – season best)

=== Men ===
Track and road events

Athlete	Event	Heat		Semifinal		Final	
Athlete	Event	Result	Rank	Result	Rank	Result	Rank
Brian Gregan	400 metres	45.37	18 Q	45.42	19	Did not advance	
Mark English	800 metres	1:48.01	34	Did not advance			
Mick Clohisey	Marathon	—N/a				2:16:21	22
Sean Hehir	Marathon	—N/a				2:27:33	63
Paul Pollock	Marathon	—N/a				DNS	–
Thomas Barr	400 metres hurdles	49.79	18 Q	DNS	–	Did not advance	
Alex Wright	20 kilometres walk	—N/a				DQ	–
Brendan Boyce	50 kilometres walk	—N/a				DNS	–
Robert Heffernan	50 kilometres walk	—N/a				3:44:41 SB	8

=== Women ===
Track and road events

Athlete	Event	Heat		Semifinal		Final	
Athlete	Event	Result	Rank	Result	Rank	Result	Rank
Síofra Cléirigh Büttner	800 metres	2:06.54	40	Did not advance			
Ciara Mageean	1500 metres	4:10.60	34	Did not advance			
Claire McCarthy	Marathon	—N/a				2:38:26	33
