= Nickisha Pryce =

Jamaican athlete (born 2001)

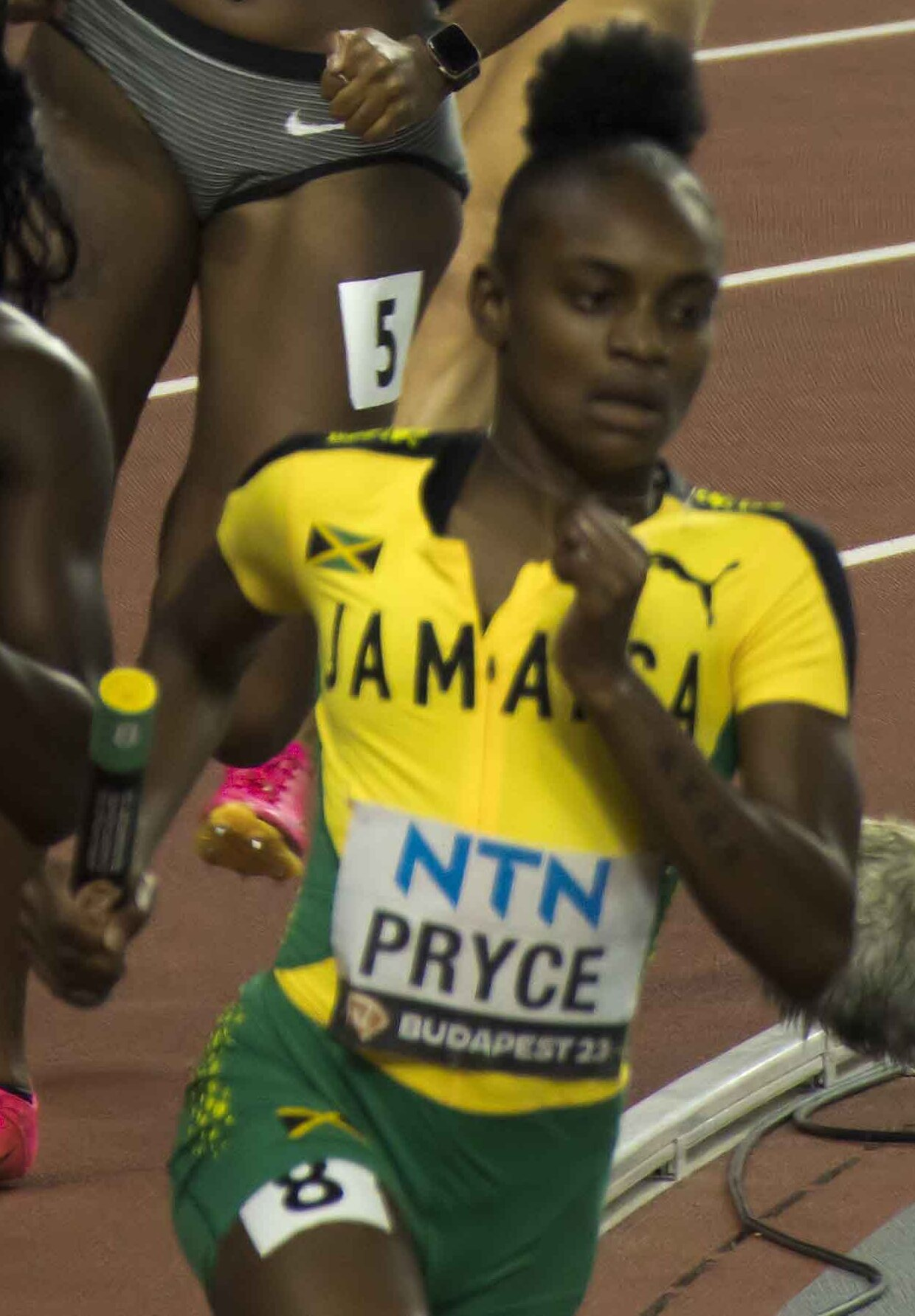
- Nickisha Pryce in 2023

Personal information
- Nationality: Jamaican
- Born: 7 March 2001 (age 25)

Sport
- Sport: Athletics
- Event: 400 m
- College team: Arkansas Razorbacks
- Club: Hurdle Mechanic
- Coached by: Chris Johnson

Achievements and titles
- Personal bests: 200 m: 22.62s (Fayetteville, 2024); 400 m: 48.57s NR (London, 2024)
Medal record
Women's athletics
Representing Jamaica
World Championships
Silver medal – second place	2023 Budapest	4 × 400 m relay
Silver medal – second place	2025 Tokyo	4 × 400 m relay
World Ultimate Championship
Third place	2026 Budapest	400 m
Diamond League
Third place	2026	400 m
NACAC Championships
Gold medal – first place	2025 Freeport	400 m

Nickisha Pryce (born 7 March 2001) is a Jamaican track and field athlete. In 2023, she became the Jamaican national champion over 400 m.

== Early life ==
She was born in St. Mary, Jamaica. Pryce attended Vere Technical High School in Hayes, Clarendon, Jamaica, before attending Iowa Western Community College and then the University of Arkansas.

== Career ==
In 2018, Pryce ran 53.50 seconds in the 400 metres and 24.62 in the 200 metres. At Vere Technical High School, she set a new personal best of 53.35 seconds in finishing runner-up in the 400 metres at the 2019 ISSA Boys and Girls Championships. In 2021, Pryce was voted the ICCAC Women's Outdoor Track Athlete of the Year, having previously also won the award for the indoor season.

=== 2023 ===
Competing at the 2023 NCAA Division I Outdoor Track and Field Championships in Austin, Texas, Pryce finished third in the 400 m, behind Rhasidat Adeleke and Britton Wilson, running the event in a personal best time of 50.23 seconds.

Pryce won the Jamaican national 400 m title in July 2023, lowering her personal best time to 50.21 seconds, ahead of Janieve Russell in second, and Candice McLeod in third. Pryce went into the event with the fastest time in the year of those in the field, and had also qualified as the fastest in the heats.

=== 2024 ===
She ran a new personal best time of 49.32 seconds for the 400 metres to win the SEC Championships in Gainesville, Florida on 11 May 2024. She lowered her personal best time to 48.89 seconds to win the 400 metres at the NCAA National Track and Field D1 Outdoor Championships in Eugene, Oregon on 8 June 2024, setting a new collegiate record and national record. In addition, she won the women's 4 × 400 m relay in a new NCAA record of 3.17:96.

On 20 July 2024, she improved her 400 m national record to 48.57 at the London Diamond League, a time which moved her up to 7th on the all-time top list.

She competed at the 2024 Summer Olympics over 400 metres in August 2024, reaching the semi-final. In December 2024, it was announced that she had signed up for the inaugural season of the Michael Johnson founded Grand Slam Track.

=== 2025 ===
At the 2025 Kingston Slam in April 2025, she competed in the Long Sprints category, running the 400 metres in 50.92 seconds. At the second event in Miami on 2 May 2025, she ran 50.71 metres for the 400 metres to finish fifth in her race. She retained her national title over 400 metres at the 2025 Jamaican Athletics Championships in June 2025. She ran 49.63 seconds to place third at the 2025 Herculis event in Monaco, part of the 2025 Diamond League, behind Olympic champion Marileidy Paulino and NCAA champion Aaliyah Butler. She won the gold medal in the 400 metres at the 2025 NACAC Championships in Freeport, The Bahamas. Competing at the 2025 World Championships, she placed eighth in the final of the women's 400 metres.

=== 2026 ===
She was initially selected to represent Jamaica at the 2026 World Athletics Indoor Championships in Toruń, Poland, but later withdrew. Competing in the 2026 Diamond League, she narrowly beat Aaliyah Butler of the United States in the 400 metres at the 2026 Shanghai Diamond League, running 49.75 seconds. On 4 June, she ran 49.80 seconds in finishing third in the 400 m at the 2026 Golden Gala in Rome, and placed fifth the following week over 400 metres at the 2026 Bislett Games. On 23 August, Pryce was second in 49.49 in the Diamond League over 400 m at the 2026 Kamila Skolimowska Memorial in Silesia, Poland. At the 2026 Diamond League Final in Brussels on 5 September, she placed third with a time of 49.36 seconds. The following week, she also placed third at the inaugural World Ultimate Championship in Budapest. On 18 September, she placed third in the 400 metres at Athlos in London.

== Personal Life ==
Daughter of Wayne Pryce and Denise Johnson and has two older siblings, Shanna and Wayne. Career plans include being a professional athlete and pediatrician. Favorite athletes are Shelly-Ann Fraser-Pryce and Shericka Jackson. Loves to dance and sing.

== Statistics ==
=== International competitions ===
Year	Competition	Venue	Position	Event	Notes
Representing Jamaica
2023	World Championships	Budapest, Hungary	15th (sf)	400 m	51.24
2023	World Championships	Budapest, Hungary	2nd	4 × 400 m relay	3:20.88
2024	Olympic Games	Paris, France	14th (sf)	400 m	50.77
2025	NACAC Championships	Freeport, Bahamas	1st	400 m	49.95
2025	World Championships	Tokyo, Japan	8th	400 m	49.97
2025	World Championships	Tokyo, Japan	2nd	4 × 400 m relay	3:19.25
2026	World Ultimate Championship	Budapest, Hungary	3rd	400 m	49.56

Grand Slam Track results
Slam	Race group	Event	Pl.	Time	Prize money
2025 Kingston Slam	Long sprints	200 m	8th	23.75	US$10,000
2025 Kingston Slam	Long sprints	400 m	6th	50.92	US$10,000
2025 Miami Slam	Long sprints	400 m	5th	50.71	US$20,000
2025 Miami Slam	Long sprints	200 m	4th	22.77	US$20,000
2025 Philadelphia Slam	Long sprints	400 m	2nd	50.04	US$30,000
2025 Philadelphia Slam	Long sprints	200 m	5th	22.96	US$30,000
