= List of Irish records in athletics =

The following are the national records in athletics in Ireland maintained by Athletics Ireland.

== Outdoor ==
Key to tables: Awaiting ratification Record not kept by AAI Not ratified or later rescinded by AAI

=== Men ===
Event	Record	Athlete	Date	Meet	Place	Ref.
100 m	10.08 (+2.0 m/s)	Israel Olatunde	30 August 2025	BFTTA Open	London, United Kingdom	
150 m (straight)	15.66 (−0.4 m/s)	Leon Reid	7 September 2019	Great City Games	Newcastle, United Kingdom	
150 m (bend)	15.14 (±0.0 m/s)	Benjamin Richardson	16 June 2026	Golden Spike Ostrava	Ostrava, Czech Republic	
200 m	20.27 (+2.0 m/s)	Sean Aigboboh	30 April 2026	Cameron Burrell Invitational	Houston, United States	
200 m (straight)	20.66 (−0.4 m/s)	Paul Hession	16 May 2010	Great CityGames Manchester	Manchester, United Kingdom	
300 m	32.47	Paul Hession	12 June 2008	Golden Spike Ostrava	Ostrava, Czech Republic	
400 m	44.77	David Gillick	4 July 2009	Meeting de Atletismo Madrid	Madrid, Spain	
500 m	57.91 (Note: road race)	Mark English	10 September 2016	Great North CityGames	Newcastle, United Kingdom	
600 m	1:15.71	Mark English	5 September 2015		Amsterdam, Netherlands	
800 m	1:42.15	Cian McPhillips	20 September 2025	World Championships	Tokyo, Japan	
1000 m	2:16.40	Luke McCann	10 August 2022	Herculis	Fontvieille, Monaco	
1000 m	2:15.82	Mark English	16 June 2026	Ostrava Golden Spike	Ostrava, Czech Republic	
1500 m	3:30.42	Andrew Coscoran	16 July 2023	Kamila Skolimowska Memorial	Chorzów, Poland	
Mile	3:49.77	Ray Flynn	7 July 1982	Bislett Games	Oslo, Norway	
Mile (road)	3:55.33	Cathal Doyle	6 September 2026	New Balance Kö Meile	Düsseldorf, Germany	
2000 m	4:55.06	Marcus O'Sullivan	10 July 1996	Nikaïa IAAF Grand Prix	Nice, France	
3000 m	7:30.36	Mark Carroll	4 August 1999	Herculis	Monaco	
5000 m	13:01.40	Brian Fay	15 July 2023	KBC Night of Athletics	Heusden-Zolder, Belgium	
5 km (road)	13:35	Frank O'Mara	14 April 1991	Carlsbad 5000	Carlsbad, United States	
5 km (road)	13:26	Alistair Cragg	1 April 2012	27th Carlsbad 5000	Carlsbad, United States	
5 km (road)	13:22	Darragh McElhinney	19 September 2026	World Road Running Championships	Copenhagen, Denmark	
10,000 m	27:26.95	Efrem Gidey	29 March 2025	The TEN	San Juan Capistrano, United States	
10 km (road)	27:38	11 January 2026	10K Valencia Ibercaja by Kiprun	Valencia, Spain		
15 km (road)	42:47	John Treacy	26 June 1988	Cascade Run Off 15-km Road Race	Portland, United States	
15 km (road)	42:25+	Peter Lynch	16 March 2026	New York Half Marathon	New York City, United States	
One hour	19625 m	John Treacy	19 September 1987	Monaco One Hour	Fontvieille Monaco	
20 km (road)
20 km (road)	57:16+	Fearghal Curtin	14 September 2025	Copenhagen Half Marathon	Copenhagen, Denmark	
20 km (road)	56:44+	Peter Lynch	16 March 2026	New York Half Marathon	New York City, United States	
Half marathon	1:00:22	Fearghal Curtin	14 September 2025	Copenhagen Half Marathon	Copenhagen, Denmark	
Half marathon	59:52	Peter Lynch	16 March 2026	New York Half Marathon	New York City, United States	
25 km (road)	1:15:14	Jerry Kiernan	13 May 1982		Limerick, Ireland	
25 km (road)	1:14:52+	Peter Lynch	26 April 2026	London Marathon	London, United Kingdom	
30 km (road)	1:29:55+	Peter Lynch	26 April 2026	London Marathon	London, United Kingdom	
Marathon	2:06:08	Peter Lynch	26 April 2026	London Marathon	London, United Kingdom	
50 km (road)	2:49:13	Gary O'Hanlon	8 February 2020	Donadea 50 km Race	Donadea, Ireland	
100 km (road)	6:50:23	Ciaran McGonagle	24 March 2024	Anglo Celtic plate	Perth, Scotland	
24 hours	244.664 km	Eoin Keith	20 July 2013	Energia 24 Hour Race	Belfast, United Kingdom	
110 m hurdles	13.30 (+0.6 m/s)	Peter Coghlan	7 August 1999		Hechtel-Eksel, Belgium	
200 m hurdles (straight)	23.19 (+2.0 m/s)	Thomas Barr	18 May 2018	Great CityGames Manchester	Manchester, United Kingdom	
400 m hurdles	47.97	Thomas Barr	18 August 2016	Olympic Games	Rio de Janeiro, Brazil	
3000 m steeplechase	8:24.09	Brendan Quinn	30 August 1985	Memorial Van Damme	Brussels, Belgium	
High jump	2.30 m	Adrian O'Dwyer	24 June 2004	IAAF African Circuit International Meeting of Algiers	Algiers, Algeria	
Pole vault	5.36 m	Brian McGovern	23 March 2013	ASU Invitational	Tempe, United States	
Long jump	8.07 m (+1.4 m/s)	Ciaran McDonagh	21 August 2005	Resisprint International Meeting	La Chaux-de-Fonds, Switzerland	
Triple jump	15.99 m (+1.4 m/s)	Samuel Okantey	2 May 2015	Rankin/Poehlein Invitational	West Lafayette, United States	
Shot put	20.93 m	Eric Favors	27 April 2024	Throws U 2024 Series #1	Fleetwood, United States	
Discus throw	67.89 m	Nick Sweeney	4 September 1998		Helsingborg, Sweden	
Hammer throw	77.80 m	Declan Hegarty	28 April 1985	Mt. SAC Relays	Walnut, United States	
Javelin throw	82.75 m	Terry McHugh	5 August 2000	London Grand Prix	London, United Kingdom	
Decathlon	7882 pts	Carlos O'Connell	4–5 June 1988	2nd Mount St Mary's College Alumni Decathlon	Emmitsburg, United States	
Decathlon	100m (wind) / Long jump (wind) / Shot put / High jump / 400m / 110m H (wind) / Discus / Pole vault / Javelin / 1500m; 10.89 / 7.50 m / 13.05 m / 1.92 m / 48.84 / 14.59w / 41.70 m / 4.40 m / 54.96 m / 4:21.75					
3000 m walk (track)	10:58.47	Alex Wright	8 July 2014	63rd Cork City Sports	Cork, Ireland	
5000 m walk (track)	18:59.37	Robert Heffernan	30 June 2007	Grand Prix Meeting	Barcelona, Spain	
10,000 m walk (track)	38:27.57	Robert Heffernan	21 July 2008	Irish Championships	Santry, Ireland	
10 km walk (road)	39:15	Robert Heffernan	17 September 2011		A Coruña, Spain	
20,000 m walk (track)	1:23:51.12	Bobby O'Leary	14 July 1991	Irish Championships	Santry, Ireland	
20 km walk (road)	1:19:22	Robert Heffernan	10 May 2008	IAAF World Race Walking Cup	Cheboksary, Russia	
30 km walk (road)	2:07:48	Robert Heffernan	30 January 2011	Woodie's DIY National 30k Walking Championships	Cork, Ireland	
35 km walk (road)	2:44:25	Brendan Boyce	5 March 2022	Race Walking Team Championships	Muscat, Oman	
50 km walk (road)	3:37:54	Robert Heffernan	11 August 2012	Olympic Games	London, United Kingdom	
4 × 100 m relay	38.88	Ireland; Michael Farrelly; Sean Aigboboh; Marcus Lawler; Israel Olatunde	28 June 2025	European Team Championships	Maribor, Slovenia	
4 × 400 m relay	3:01.26	Ireland; Brian Gregan; Brian Murphy; Thomas Barr; Mark English	29 August 2015	World Championships	Beijing, China	
Distance medley relay	9:24.10	Paul Robinson 2:52.8 (1200m); Brian Gregan 45.9 (400m); Mark English 1:46.7 (800m); Ciarán Ó Lionáird 3:58.7 (1600 m)	27 April 2013	Penn Relays	Philadelphia, United States	
4 × mile relay	15:49.08	Eamonn Coghlan; Ray Flynn; Frank O'Mara; Marcus O'Sullivan	17 August 1985	GOAL National Sports Day Event	Dublin, Ireland	

=== Women ===
Event	Record	Athlete	Date	Meet	Place	Ref.
100 m	11.13 (+0.7 m/s)	Rhasidat Adeleke	30 June 2024	Irish Championships	Dublin, Ireland	
200 m	22.34 (+1.8 m/s)	Rhasidat Adeleke	14 April 2023	Tom Jones Memorial	Gainesville, United States	
200 m	22.28 (+0.7 m/s)	Rhasidat Adeleke	13 August 2026	European Championships	Birmingham, United Kingdom	
300 m	37.04	Phil Healy	22 May 2024	Trond Mohn Games	Bergen, Norway	
300 m	35.38+	Rhasidat Adeleke	12 July 2024	Herculis	Fontvieille, Monaco	
400 m	49.07	Rhasidat Adeleke	10 June 2024	European Championships	Rome, Italy	
800 m	1:58.51	Ciara Mageean	25 May 2024	British Milers Club Grand Prix	Manchester, United Kingdom	
1000 m	2:31.06	Ciara Mageean	14 August 2020	Herculis	Fontvieille, Monaco	
1500 m	3:55.87	Ciara Mageean	8 September 2023	Memorial Van Damme	Brussels, Belgium	
Mile	4:14.58	Ciara Mageean	21 July 2023	Herculis	Fontvieille, Monaco	
Mile (road)	4:25.05	Sonia O'Sullivan	12 September 1993		Edinburgh, United Kingdom	
2000 m	5:25.36	Sonia O'Sullivan	8 July 1994	TSB Challenge Meadowbank Stadium	Edinburgh, United Kingdom	
3000 m	8:21.64	Sonia O'Sullivan	15 July 1994	TSB Grand Prix Crystal Palace	London, United Kingdom	
Two miles	9:19.56	Sonia O'Sullivan	27 June 1998	Cork City Sports	Cork, Ireland	
5000 m	14:41.02	Sonia O'Sullivan	25 September 2000	Olympic Games	Sydney, Australia	
5 km (road)	14:55.4	Sonia O'Sullivan	1 September 2002		London, United Kingdom	
10,000 m	30:47.59	Sonia O'Sullivan	6 August 2002	European Championships	Munich, Germany	
10 km (road)	30:59	Sonia O'Sullivan	21 May 2000	Avon Running Global 10 km Championship	Milan, Italy	
15 km (road)	48:30	Catherina McKiernan	16 November 1997		Nijmegen, Netherlands	
20 km (road)	1:11:04	Teresa Duffy	13 March 1999	20 van Alphen	Alphen aan den Rijn, Netherlands	
20 km (road)	1:03:52+ a	Sonia O'Sullivan	6 October 2002	Great North Run, 22nd Edition	South Shields, United Kingdom	
Half marathon	1:08:54	Catherina McKiernan	27 September 1998	Route du Vin Half Marathon, 37th Edition	Grevenmacher, Luxembourg	
Half marathon	1:07:19 a	Sonia O'Sullivan	6 October 2002	Great North Run, 22nd Edition	South Shields, United Kingdom	
25 km (road)	1:27:15	Monica Joyce	13 May 1989	River Bank Run, 12th Edition	Grand Rapids, United States	
Marathon	2:22:23	Catherina McKiernan	1 November 1998	Amsterdam Marathon	Amsterdam, Netherlands	
100 km (road)	7:07:16 Mx	Caitriona Jennings	27 August 2022	IAU 100 km World Championships	Berlin, Germany	
100 miles	12:37:04 Mx	Caitriona Jennings	9 November 2025	Tunnel Hill Trail Races	Vienna, United States	
24 hours	229.347 km	Ruthann Sheahan	9 September 2012	World Championships	Katowice, Poland	
100 m hurdles	12.62 m (+0.5 m/s)	Sarah Lavin	23 August 2023	World Championships	Budapest, Hungary	
400 m hurdles	54.31	Susan Smith	12 August 1998	Weltklasse Zürich	Zürich, Switzerland	
2000 m steeplechase	6:13.50	Eilish Flanagan	13 June 2021	AAI Games	Dublin, Ireland	
3000 m steeplechase	9:28.29	Roisin McGettigan	28 July 2007	KBC Night of Athletics	Heusden, Netherlands	
High jump	1.95 m	Deirdre Ryan	1 September 2011	World Championships	Daegu, South Korea	
Pole vault	4.60 m	Tori Pena	6 June 2013		Chula Vista, United States	
Long jump	6.68 m (+1.9 m/s)	Elizabeth Ndudi	13 April 2024	Gary Wieneke Memorial	Champaign, United States	
Triple jump	13.62 m (+0.9 m/s)	Taneisha Scanlon-Robinson	7 June 2005	International T&F Meeting	Bratislava, Slovakia	
Shot put	16.99 m	Marita Walton	2 April 1983	Payton Jordan Cardinal Invitational	Palo Alto, United States	
Discus throw	58.40 m	Niamh Fogarty	27 April 2025	Oklahoma Throws Series	Ramona, United States	
Hammer throw	73.21 m	Eileen O'Keeffe	21 July 2007	Irish Championships	Dublin, Ireland	
Javelin throw	54.92 m	Anita Fitzgibbon	27 July 2013	Irish Championships	Dublin, Ireland	
Heptathlon	6714 pts	Kate O'Connor	19–20 September 2025	World Championships	Tokyo, Japan	
Heptathlon	100m H (wind) / High jump / Shot put / 200m (wind) / Long jump (wind) / Javelin / 800m; 13.44 (±0.0 m/s) / 1.86 m / 14.37 m / 24.07 (+0.2 m/s) / 6.22 m (+0.8 m/s) / 53.06 m / 2:09.56					
Heptathlon	6751 pts	Kate O'Connor	14–15 August 2026	European Championships	Birmingham, United Kingdom	
Heptathlon	100m H (wind) / High jump / Shot put / 200m (wind) / Long jump (wind) / Javelin / 800m; 13.30 (+1.3 m/s) / 1.86 m / 13.96 m / 23.79 (+3.4 m/s) / 6.55 m (+2.0 m/s) / 50.16 m / 2:11.74					
3000 m walk (track)	12:18.86	Kate Veale	23 July 2011		Tullamore, Ireland	
3000 m walk (track)	12:08.34	Kate Veale	11 June 2011	Irish Junior Championships	Tullamore, Ireland	
5000 m walk (track)	20:02.60	Gillian O'Sullivan	13 July 2002	Irish Championships	Santry, Ireland	
10,000 m walk (track)	45:28.75	Gillian O'Sullivan	1 August 1998	International 10 km walk	San Sebastian, Spain	
10 km walk (road)	43.22	Olive Loughnane	19 September 2009	IAAF Walking Grand Challenge	Saransk, Russia	
20 km walk (road)	1:27:22	Gillian O'Sullivan	1 May 2003	IAAF Grand Prix	Sesto San Giovanni, Italy	
4 × 100 m relay	43.73	Ireland; Sarah Leahy; Ciara Neville; Lauren Roy; Sarah Lavin	19 July 2025	London Athletics Meet	London, United Kingdom	
4 × 100 m relay	43.13	Ireland; Lucy-May Sleeman; Ciara Neville; Sarah Leahy; Lauren Roy	15 August 2026	European Championships	Birmingham, United Kingdom	
4 × 200 m relay	1:35.93	Ireland; Aoife Lynch; Kate Doherty; Sarah Quinn; Sophie Becker	2 May 2021	World Relays	Chorzów, Poland	
4 × 400 m relay	3:19.90	Ireland; Sophie Becker; Phil Healy; Rhasidat Adeleke; Sharlene Mawdsley	10 August 2024	Olympic Games	Saint-Denis, France	
4 × 1500 m relay	17:19.09	BMC Ireland; Maria Lynch; Elaine Fitzgerald; Pauline Thom; Sonia O'Sullivan	24 June 2000		London, United Kingdom	

=== Mixed ===
Event	Record	Athlete	Date	Meet	Place	Ref.
4 × 400 m relay	3:09.92	Ireland; Chris O'Donnell; Rhasidat Adeleke; Thomas Barr; Sharlene Mawdsley	7 June 2024	European Championships	Rome, Italy	

== Indoor ==
=== Men ===
Event	Record	Athlete	Date	Meet	Place	Ref.
60 m	6.54	Bori Akinola	11 February 2026	Belgrade Indoor Meeting	Belgrade, Serbia	
100 m	10.36	Paul Hession	27 February 2008		Tampere, Finland	
200 m	20.64	Mark Smyth	11 March 2023	Leinster Championship	Abbotstown, Ireland	
300 m	33.27	Jack Raftery	7 December 2022		Athlone, Ireland	
400 m	45.52	David Gillick	3 March 2007	European Championships	Birmingham, United Kingdom	
400 m	45.52	David Gillick	20 February 2010	Aviva Indoor Grand Prix	Birmingham, United Kingdom	
500 m	1:00.63 (Note: by AAI and World Athletics sources; 1:00.93 by other souces)	Mark English	17 February 2016 (Note: by World Athletics source; 18 February 2016 by AAI source, probably a typo)	Globen Galan	Stockholm, Sweden	
600 m	1:15.80	Mark English	15 January 2026	Track & Field Live	Abbotstown, Ireland	
800 m	1:44.23	Mark English	3 February 2026	Czech Indoor Gala	Ostrava, Czech Republic	
1000 m	2:17.40	Luke McCann	12 February 2022	American Track League	Louisville, United States	
1500 m	3:33.09	Andrew Coscoran	19 February 2026	Meeting Hauts-de-France Pas-de-Calais	Liévin, France	
Mile	3:49.26	Andrew Coscoran	8 February 2025	Millrose Games	New York, United States	
2000 m	4:54.07	Eamonn Coghlan	20 February 1987	Los Angeles Times Invitational	Inglewood, United States	
3000 m	7:30.75	Andrew Coscoran	2 February 2025	New Balance Indoor Grand Prix	Boston, United States	
5000 m	13:12.56	Andrew Coscoran	26 January 2024	BU John Thomas Terrier Classic	Boston, United States	
50 m hurdles	6.56	Peter Coghlan	4 March 2001		Sindelfingen, Germany	
55 m hurdles	7.21	Peter Coghlan	8 March 1998		Ithaca, United States	
60 m hurdles	7.57	Peter Coghlan	26 February 1999		Blacksburg, United States	
400 m hurdles	50.50	Thomas Barr	4 February 2018	AAI Games	Dublin, Ireland	
High jump	2.28 m	Brendan Reilly	5 March 2000		Reykjavík, Iceland	
High jump	2.28 m	Adrian O'Dwyer	24 February 2004		Budapest, Hungary	
Pole vault	5.31 m	Sean Brendan Roth	5 February 2021	Doc Hale Virginia Tech Elite	Blacksburg, United States	
Long jump	8.00 m	Ciaran McDonagh	14 January 2006		Blacksburg, United States	
Triple jump	16.27 m	Colm Cronin	10 March 1978		Detroit, United States	
Shot put	20.18 m	Eric Favors	27 January 2024	Astana Indoor Meeting	Astana, Kazakhstan	
Weight throw	22.45 m	Declan Hegarty	24 February 1984		Boston, United States	
Heptathlon	5560 pts	Joseph Naughton	2–3 February 2002		Tallinn, Estonia	
Heptathlon	60m / Long jump / Shot put / High jump / 60m H / Pole vault / 1000m; 7.23 / 7.02 m / 13.90 m / 2.04 m / 8.43 / 4.15 m / 2:42.85					
Mile walk	5:39.75	Robert Heffernan	15 February 2014	Millrose Games	New York City, United States	
3000 m walk	11:06.69	Alex Wright	2 February 2019	Irish Championships	Abbotstown, Ireland	
5000 m walk	18:50.70	Alex Wright	18 February 2017	Irish Championships	Dublin, Ireland	
4 × 200 m relay	1:26.59	Ireland; Gary Ryan; Mark Howard; David McCarthy; Paul Hession	10 January 2002		Dublin, Ireland	
4 × 400 m relay	3:08.83	Ireland; Rob Daly; Gary Ryan; David Gillick; David McCarthy	7 March 2004	World Championships	Budapest, Hungary	
4 × 400 m relay	3:08.63	Ireland; Cillin Greene; Cathal Crosbie; Brian Gregan; Christopher O'Donnell	20 March 2022	World Championships	Belgrade, Serbia	

=== Women ===
Event	Record	Athlete	Date	Meet	Place	Ref.
50 m	6.41	Sarah Leahy	14 January 2026 (Note: by World Athletics source; 15 January 2026 by AAI source, probably a typo)	Meeting indoor locarnese	Locarno, Switzerland	
55 m	7.09	Aoife Hearne	20 February 1999		Providence, United States	
60 m	7.15 A	Rhasidat Adeleke	20 January 2024	Dr. Martin Luther King Collegiate Invitational	Albuquerque, United States	
100 m	12.02	Anna Boyle	1 February 2006		Bath, United Kingdom	
100 m	11.91	Ailis McSweeney	27 February 2010	Florø Indoor Meet	Florø, Norway	
200 m	22.49 A	Rhasidat Adeleke	20 January 2024	Dr. Martin Luther King Collegiate Invitational	Albuquerque, United States	
300 m	36.30	Rhasidat Adeleke	14 February 2026	Tyson Invitational	Fayetteville, United States	
400 m	50.33	Rhasidat Adeleke	25 February 2023	Big 12 Championships	Lubbock, United States	
600 m	1:28.09	Maeve O'Neill	6 December 2025	Sharon Colyear-Danville Season Opener	Boston, United States	
800 m	2:00.58	Síofra Cléirigh Buttner	21 February 2021	American Track League Meeting #4	Fayetteville, United States	
1000 m	2:40.01	Georgie Hartigan	19 February 2022	Birmingham Indoor Grand Prix	Birmingham, United Kingdom	
1500 m	4:01.62	Sarah Healy	15 February 2025	Keely Klassic	Birmingham, United Kingdom	
Mile	4:28.31	Ciara Mageean	26 January 2019	New Balance Indoor Grand Prix	Boston, United States	
2000 m	5:56.32	Monica Joyce	18 January 1985		Los Angeles, United States	
3000 m	8:30.79	Sarah Healy	8 February 2025	Millrose Games	New York City, United States	
Two miles	9:36.70	Roisin Flanagan	11 February 2024	Millrose Games	New York City, United States	
5000 m	15:17.28	Sonia O'Sullivan	26 January 1991		Boston, United States	
50 m hurdles	6.80	Derval O'Rourke	3 March 2006		Liévin, France	
60 m hurdles	7.84	Derval O'Rourke	11 March 2006	World Championships	Moscow, Russia	
High jump	1.93 m	Deirdre Ryan	18 January 2009		Leverkusen, Germany	
Pole vault	4.45 m A	Tori Pena	20 January 2012		Reno, United States	
Pole vault	4.46 m A	Tori Pena	7 February 2015	New Mexico Classic	Albuquerque, United States	
Long jump	6.59 m	Kelly Proper	6 March 2009	European Championships	Turin, Italy	
Long jump	6.62 m	Kelly Proper	23 January 2010	Vienna Gala	Vienna, Austria	
Triple jump	13.28 m	Taneisha Scanlon	12 February 2005		Sheffield, United Kingdom	
Shot put	17.06 m (Note: outdoor mark ratified as absolute record)	Marita Walton	26 February 1982		New York City, United States	
Weight throw	19.02 m	Margaret Hayden	9 February 2024	Millrose Games	New York City, United States	
Discus throw	47.24 m	Clare Fitgerald	10 March 2012	World Indoor Throwing	Växjö, Sweden	
Pentathlon	4781 pts	Kate O'Connor	9 March 2025	European Championships	Apeldoorn, Netherlands	
Pentathlon	60m H / High jump / Shot put / Long jump / 800m; 8.31 / 1.84 m / 14.32 m / 6.27 m / 2:11.42					
Pentathlon	4839 pts	Kate O'Connor	22 March 2026	World Championships	Toruń, Poland	
Pentathlon	60m H / High jump / Shot put / Long jump / 800m; 8.23 / 1.81 m / 14.70 m / 6.28 m / 2:10.26					
3000 m walk	11:35.34 (Note: no international judges)	Gillian O'Sullivan	15 February 2003		Belfast, United Kingdom	
4 × 200 m relay	1:37.43	Ireland; Ciara Sheehy; Martina McCarthy; Derval O'Rourke; Claire Bergin	10 February 2002		Cardiff, United Kingdom	
4 × 400 m relay	3:28.45	Ireland; Roisin Harrison; Sharlene Mawdsley; Phil Healy; Sophie Becker	3 March 2024	World Championships	Glasgow, United Kingdom	

=== Mixed ===
Event	Record	Athlete	Date	Meet	Place	Ref.
4 × 400 m relay	3:17.63	Ireland; Conor Kelly; Phil Healy; Marcus Lawler; Sharlene Mawdsley	6 March 2025	European Championships	Apeldoorn, Netherlands	
