= 2023 World Athletics Championships – Women's 4 × 400 metres relay =

Women's athletic competition

Women's 4 × 400 metres relay at the 2023 World Athletics Championships
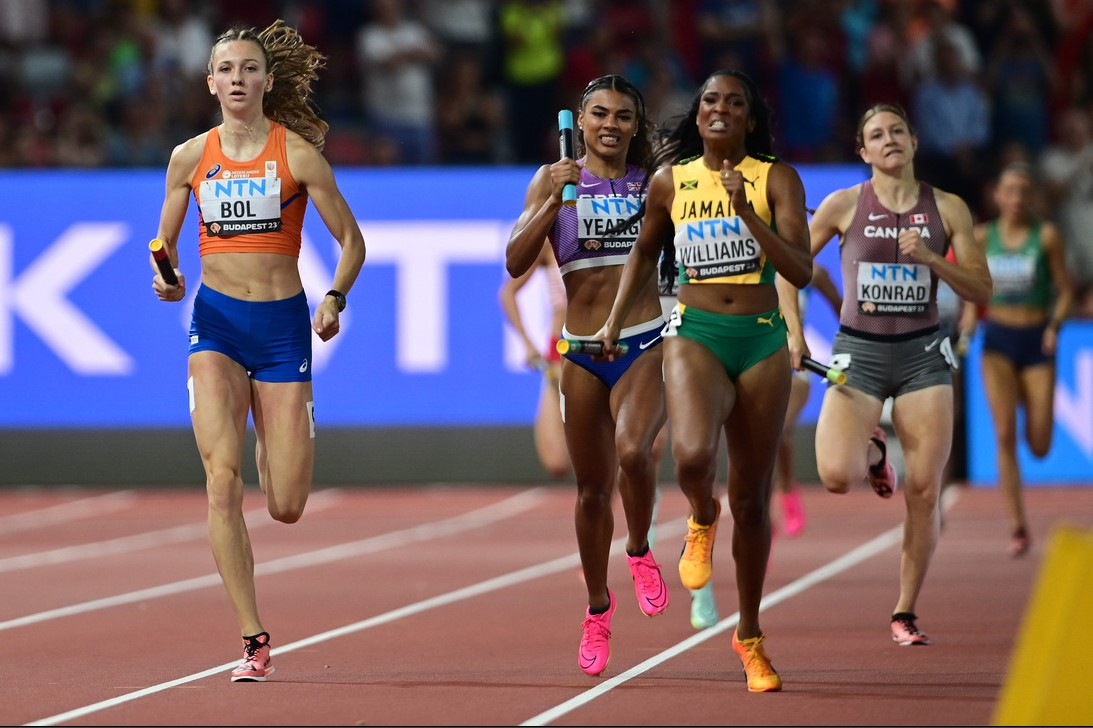
- Femke Bol (left) passed Nicole Yeargin and Stacey-Ann Williams in the last hundred metres of the final.
- Venue: National Athletics Centre
- Location: Budapest, Hungary
- Dates: 26 August 2023 (round 1); 27 August 2023 (final)
- Teams: 17 nations
- Winning time: 3:20.72 min NR

Medalists
gold medal	Eveline Saalberg, Lieke Klaver, Cathelijn Peeters, Femke Bol, Lisanne de Witte (Note: This athlete competed in round 1, but was replaced in the final.)	Netherlands
silver medal	Candice McLeod, Janieve Russell, Nickisha Pryce, Stacey-Ann Williams, Charokee Young, Shiann Salmon	Jamaica
bronze medal	Laviai Nielsen, Amber Anning, Ama Pipi, Nicole Yeargin, Yemi Mary John	Great Britain and Northern Ireland

The women's 4 × 400 metres relay at the 2023 World Athletics Championships was held over two rounds at the National Athletics Centre in Budapest, Hungary, on 26 and 27 August 2023.

Seventeen national relay teams participated in round 1, where nine teams qualified for the final, the teams of Italy and Hungary set national records and the teams of Nigeria and the United States were disqualified. The final was won by the team of the Netherlands in a national record of 3:20.72 minutes, followed by the team of Jamaica in second place in 3:20.88 min and the team of Great Britain and Northern Ireland in third place in 3:21.04 min.

== Background ==
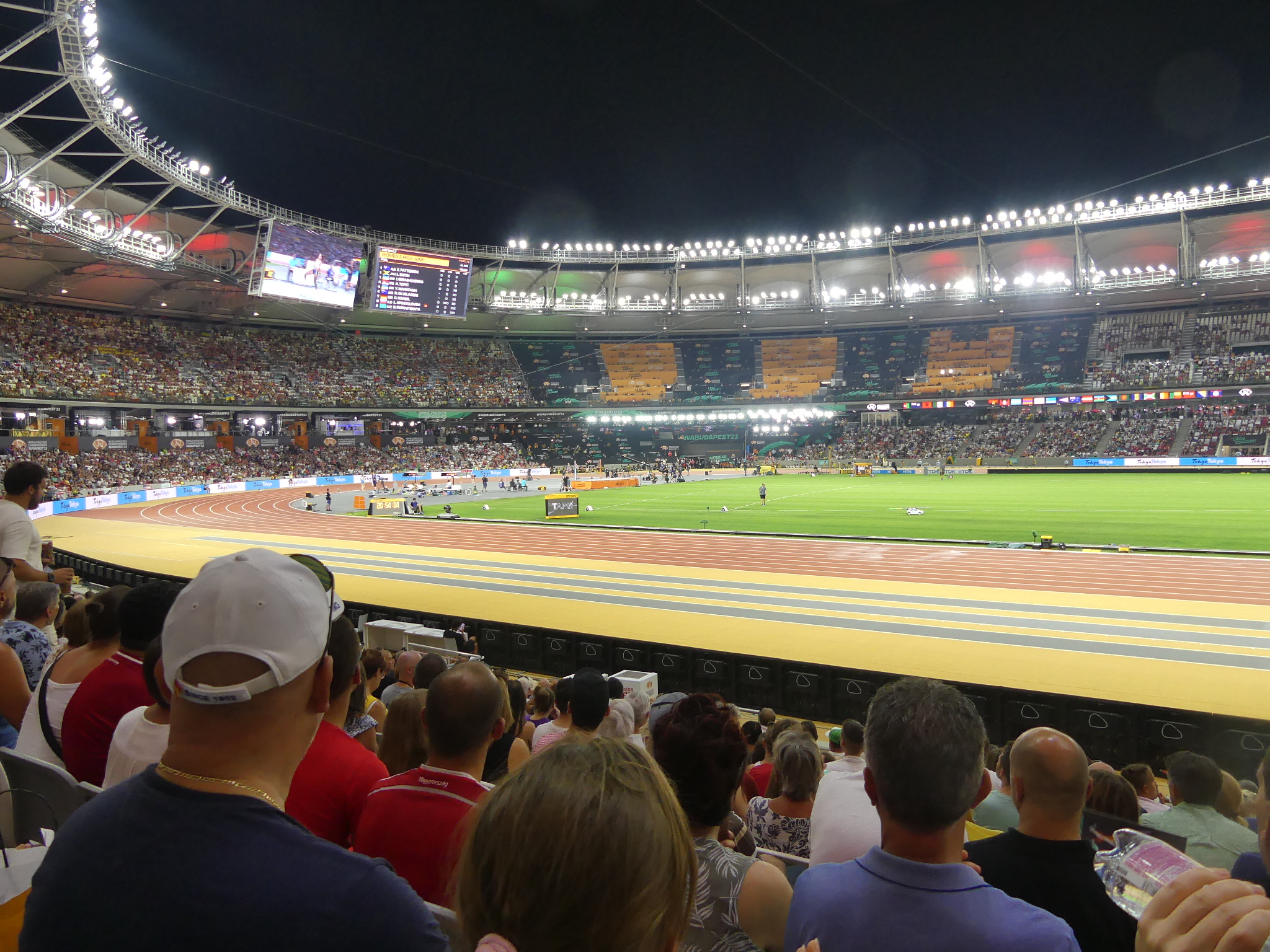
The National Athletics Centre in Budapest, Hungary, on 27 August 2023

Before the competition records were as follows:

Global records before the 2023 World Championships
Record	Nation (athletes)	Time	Location	Date
World record	Soviet Union (Tatyana Ledovskaya, Olga Nazarova, Mariya Pinigina, Olga Bryzgina)	3:15.17	Seoul, South Korea	1 October 1988
Championship record	United States (Gwen Torrence, Maicel Malone, Natasha Kaiser, Jearl Miles Clark)	3:16.71	Stuttgart, Germany	22 August 1993
World leading	University of Texas (Lanae-Tava Thomas, Kennedy Simon, Julien Alfred, Rhasidat Adeleke)	3:23.27	Austin, Texas, United States	1 April 2023

Area records before the 2023 World Championships
Record	Nation (athletes)	Time	Location	Date
African record	Nigeria (Olabisi Afolabi, Fatimat Yusuf, Charity Opara, Falilat Ogunkoya)	3:21.04	Atlanta, Georgia, United States	3 August 1996
Asian record	(China) Hebei (Bai Xiaoyun, Cao Chunying, Ma Yuqin, An Xiaohong)	3:24.28	Beijing, China	13 September 1993
North, Central American and Caribbean record	United States (Denean Howard, Diane Dixon, Valerie Brisco-Hooks, Florence Griffith Joyner)	3:15.51	Seoul, South Korea	1 October 1988
South American record	(Brazil) BM&F Bovespa (Geisa Coutinho, Bárbara Farias de Oliveira, Joelma Sousa, Jailma de Lima)	3:26.68	São Paulo, Brazil	7 August 2011
European record	Soviet Union (Tatyana Ledovskaya, Olga Nazarova, Mariya Pinigina, Olga Bryzgina)	3:15.17	Seoul, South Korea	1 October 1988
Oceanian record	Australia (Nova Peris-Kneebone, Tamsyn Manou, Melinda Gainsford-Taylor, Cathy Freeman)	3:23.81	Sydney, Australia	30 September 2000

== Qualification ==
After the postponement for COVID-19 pandemic reasons of the 2023 World Relays to 2024 Nassau, the modified system to qualify automatically is to have finished in the first eight (finalists) at 2022 World Championships, in Eugene, completed by eight more 2022-2023 top lists' teams. Additionally, host country Hungary received a bye for the event.

The top 8 from the 2022 World Athletics Championships:

- United States (1st)
- Jamaica (2nd)
- Great Britain & N.I. (3rd)
- Canada (4th)
- France (5th)
- Belgium (6th)
- Italy (7th)
- Switzerland (8th)

Top list before 30 July 2023:

- 3:20.87 Netherlands Olympiastadion, München (GER) - 20 August 2022
- 3:21.68 Poland Olympiastadion, München (GER) - 20 August 2022
- 3:26.06 Ireland Olympiastadion, München (GER) - 19 August 2022
- 3:26.08 Cuba San Salvador (ESA) - 7 July 2023
- 3:26.09 Germany Olympiastadion, München (GER) - 20 August 2022
- 3:27.60 Nigeria Yabatech Sport Complex, Lagos (NGR) - 14 July 2023
- 3:27.76 Spain Olympiastadion, München (GER) - 19 August 2022
- 3:27.84 Dominican Republic San Salvador (ESA) - 7 July 2023 Not entered (was Next best by Top List)
- 3:28.79 Botswana Nyayo National Stadium, Nairobi (KEN) - 24 June 2023

== Results ==
=== Round 1 ===
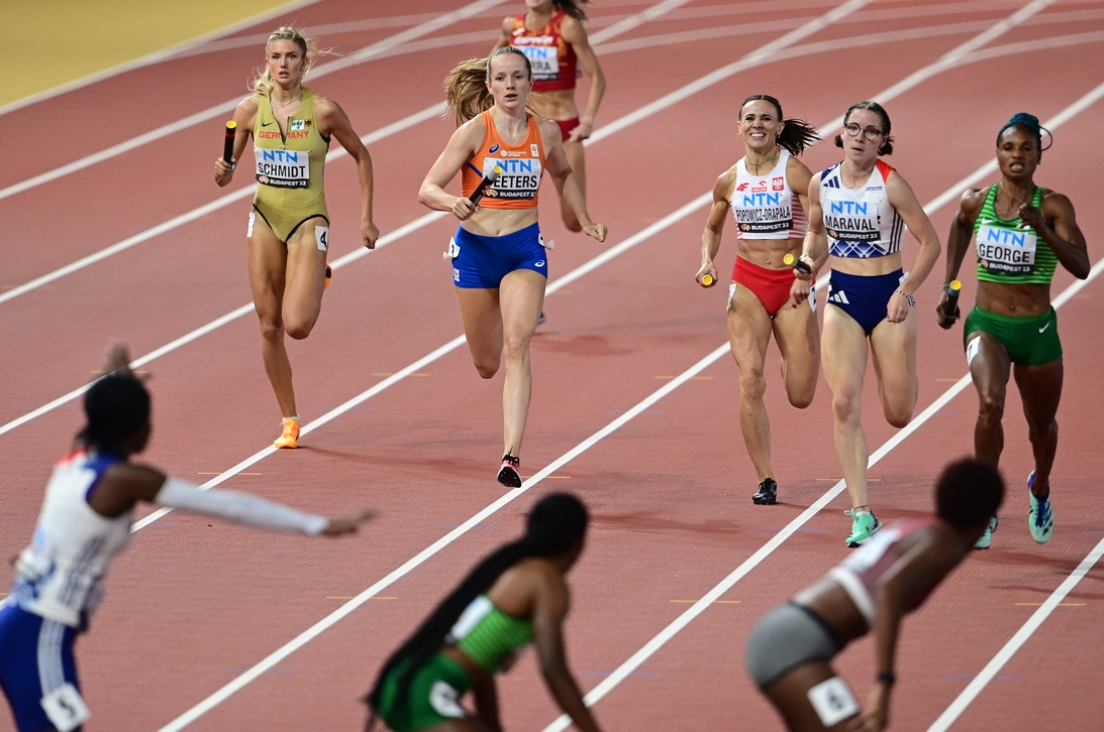
Second-leg runners of the first heat approaching the handover

Seventeen national teams competed in the two heats of round 1 on 26 August in the evening, starting at 19.55 (UTC+2). Eight teams, the first three teams in each heat (Q) and the next two fastest teams overall (q), qualified for the final. In the first heat, the team of Nigeria was disqualified (DQ) for a fault at recovering a dropped baton (TR24.6) and the team of France additionally advanced to the final by referee's decision (qR). In the second heat, the Italian team set a national record (NR) of 3:23.86 min, the Hungarian team set a national record (NR) of 3:27.79 min, and the team of the United States was disqualified for passing the baton outside the takeover zone (TR24.7).

Results of round 1
Rank	Heat	Lane	Nation	Athletes	Time	Notes
1	1	8	Jamaica	Charokee Young, Nickisha Pryce, Shiann Salmon, Stacey Ann Williams	3:22.74	Q, WL
2	1	6	Canada	Zoe Sherar, Aiyanna Stiverne, Kyra Constantine, Grace Konrad	3:23.29	Q, SB
3	2	3	Great Britain & N.I.	Laviai Nielsen, Amber Anning, Nicole Yeargin, Yemi Mary John	3:23.33	Q, SB
4	2	5	Belgium	Naomi Van den Broeck, Imke Vervaet, Hanne Claes, Helena Ponette	3:23.63	Q, SB
5	1	3	Netherlands	Eveline Saalberg, Cathelijn Peeters, Lisanne de Witte, Femke Bol	3:23.75	Q, SB
6	2	4	Italy	Alice Mangione, Ayomide Folorunso, Alessandra Bonora, Giancarla Trevisan	3:23.86	Q, NR
7	1	2	Poland	Alicja Wrona-Kutrzepa, Marika Popowicz-Drapala, Patrycja Wyciszkiewicz-Zawadzka, Natalia Kaczmarek	3:24.05	q, SB
8	2	6	Ireland	Sophie Becker, Róisín Harrison, Kelly McGrory, Sharlene Mawdsley	3:26.18	q, SB
9	1	5	France	Amandine Brossier, Louise Maraval, Sounkamba Sylla, Camille Seri	3:27.50	qR, SB
10	1	4	Germany	Luna Thiel, Alica Schmidt, Mona Mayer, Carolina Krafzik	3:27.74	SB
11	2	2	Hungary	Evelin Nádházy, Bianka Kéri, Fanni Rapai, Janka Molnár	3:27.79	NR
12	2	9	Switzerland	Gulia Senn, Julia Niederberger, Rachel Pellaud, Catia Gubelmann	3:29.07	SB
13	2	1	Cuba	Zurian Hechavarría, Lisneidy Veitía, Rose Mary Almanza, Roxana Gómez	3:29.70	
14	2	8	Botswana	Lydia Jele, Oratile Nowe, Galefele Moroko, Obakeng Kamberuka	3:31.85	
15	1	9	Spain	Eva Santidrián, Herminia Parra, Laura Bueno, Barbara Camblor	3:31.91	
	2	7	United States	Lynna Irby-Jackson, Rosey Effiong, Quanera Hayes, Alexis Holmes	DQ	TR24.7
	1	7	Nigeria	Ella Onojuvwevwo, Patience Okon George, Opeyemi Deborah Oke, Imaobong Nse Uko	DQ	TR24.6

=== Final ===
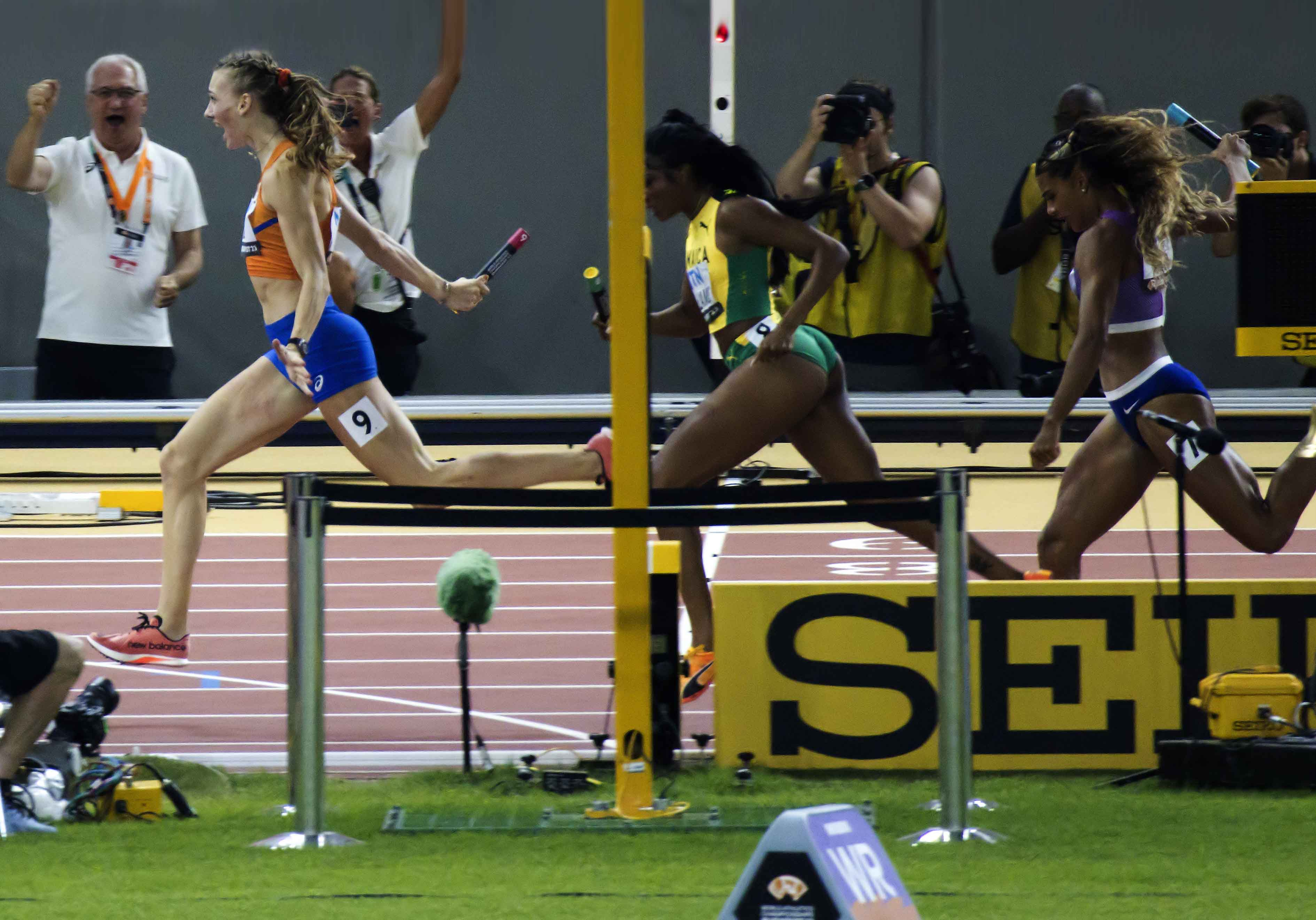
Finish of Femke Bol, Stacey-Ann Williams, and Nicole Yeargin in the final

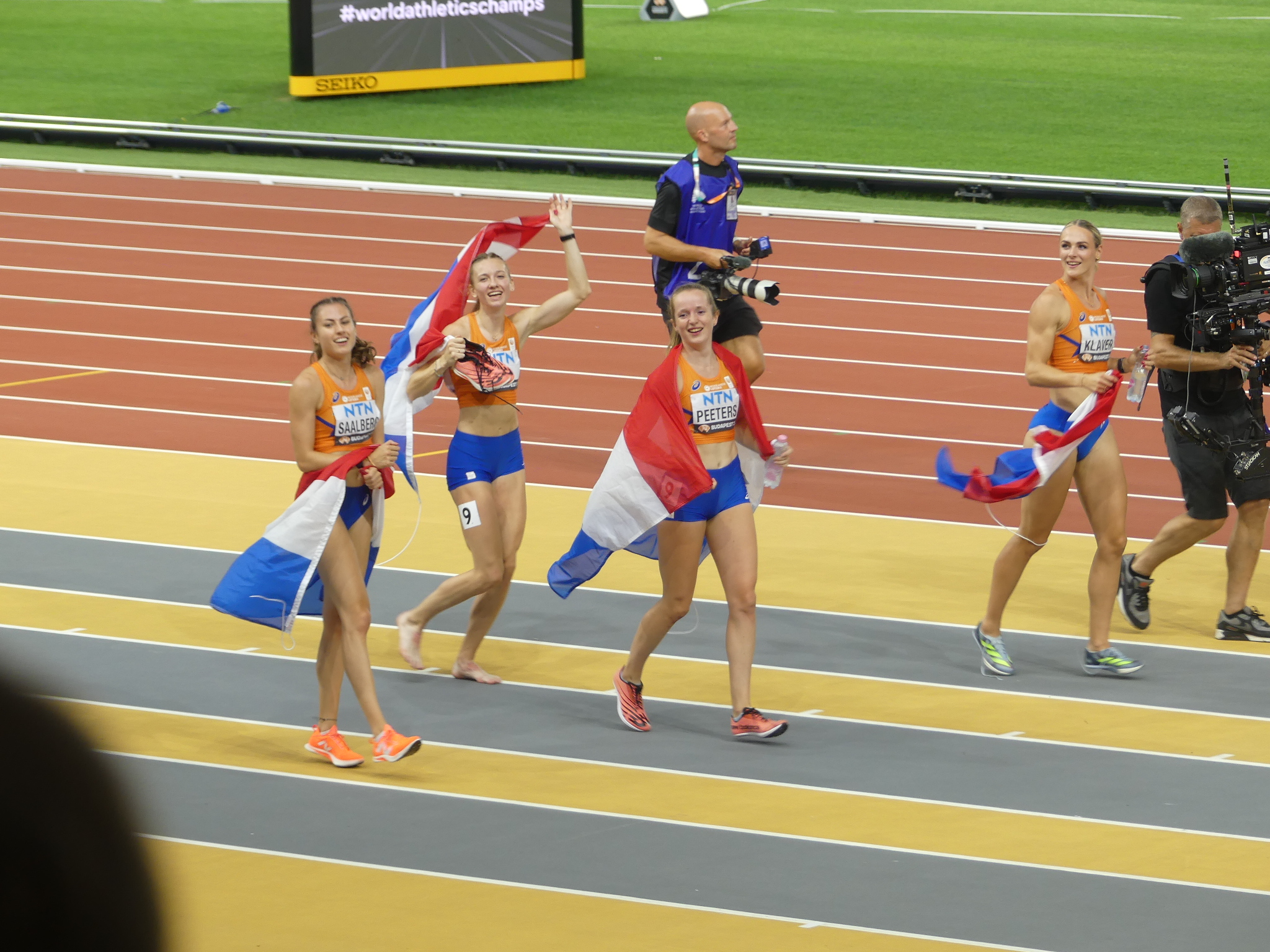
Eveline Saalberg, Femke Bol, Cathelijn Peeters, and Lieke Klaver of the Netherlands celebrating after the final race

Nine teams competed in the final on 27 August in the evening, starting at 21.50 (UTC+2). After the first leg, Candice McLeod of Jamaica was the first to hand over the baton, followed by Laviai Nielsen of Great Britain and Northern Ireland and Eveline Saalberg of the Netherlands. After the second leg, Lieke Klaver of the Netherlands had moved into first place, followed by Janieve Russell of Jamaica and Amber Anning of Great Britain and Northern Ireland. After the third leg, Nickisha Pryce of Jamaica reached the hand-over first, followed by Ama Pipi of Great Britain and Northern Ireland and Cathelijn Peeters of the Netherlands. In the anchor leg, Femke Bol of the Netherlands started in third position, first overtook Nicole Yeargin of Great Britain and Northern Ireland and then passed Stacey Ann Williams in the last 20 metres. The race was won by the team of the Netherlands in a world leading performance (WL) and national record (NR) of 3:20.72 min, followed by the team of Jamaica in second place in 3:20.88 min and the team of Great Britain and Northern Ireland in third place in 3:21.04 min. The fastest split times were 48.75 s by Bol, 48.78 s by Klaver, and 48.80 s by Natalia Kaczmarek of Poland, although the split times of the team of Canada were not reported.

Results of the final
Rank	Lane	Nation	Athletes	Time	Notes
1st place, gold medalist(s)	9	Netherlands	Eveline Saalberg, Lieke Klaver, Cathelijn Peeters, Femke Bol	3:20.72	WL NR
2nd place, silver medalist(s)	8	Jamaica	Candice McLeod, Janieve Russell, Nickisha Pryce, Stacey Ann Williams	3:20.88	SB
3rd place, bronze medalist(s)	7	Great Britain & N.I.	Laviai Nielsen, Amber Anning, Ama Pipi, Nicole Yeargin	3:21.04	SB
4	5	Canada	Zoe Sherar, Aiyanna Stiverne, Kyra Constantine, Grace Konrad	3:22.42	SB
5	6	Belgium	Helena Ponette, Imke Vervaet, Hanne Claes, Camille Laus	3:22.84	SB
6	2	Poland	Alicja Wrona-Kutrzepa, Marika Popowicz-Drapała, Patrycja Wyciszkiewicz-Zawadzka, Natalia Kaczmarek	3:24.93	
7	4	Italy	Alice Mangione, Anna Polinari, Alessandra Bonora, Giancarla Trevisan	3:24.98	
8	3	Ireland	Sophie Becker, Róisín Harrison, Kelly McGrory, Sharlene Mawdsley	3:27.08	
9	1	France	Amandine Brossier, Louise Maraval, Marjorie Veyssiere, Camille Seri	3:28.35	
