= Ireland at the 2022 World Athletics Championships =

- Flag of Ireland
- WA code: IRL

in Eugene, United States 15 July 2022 – 24 July 2022
- Competitors: 22 (10 men and 12 women)
- Medals: Gold 0 Silver 0 Bronze 0 Total 0

World Athletics Championships appearances
- 1980; 1983; 1987; 1991; 1993; 1995; 1997; 1999; 2001; 2003; 2005; 2007; 2009; 2011; 2013; 2015; 2017; 2019; 2022; 2023; 2025

Ireland competed at the 2022 World Athletics Championships in Eugene, United States, from 15 to 24 July 2022.

== Results ==
Ireland entered 22 athletes.

Key

- Q = Qualified for the next round
- q = Qualified for the next round as a fastest loser or, in field events, by position without achieving the qualifying target
- NR = National record
- PB = Personal best
- SB = Season best
- N/A = Round not applicable for the event

=== Men ===
Track and road events

Athlete	Event	Heat		Semi-final		Final	
Athlete	Event	Result	Rank	Result	Rank	Result	Rank
Christopher O'Donnell	400 m	46.01	4 q	46.01	7	Did not advance	
Mark English	800 m	1:44.76 SB	3 Q	1:45.78	5	Did not advance	
Andrew Coscoran	1500 m	3:36.36 SB	3 Q	3:44.66	12	Did not advance	
Thomas Barr	400 m hurdles	49.15 SB	2 Q	50.08	5	Did not advance	
David Kenny	20 km walk	—N/a				1:31:23	39
Brendan Boyce	35 km walk	—N/a				2:33:31 SB	25

Field events

Athlete	Event	Qualification		Final	
Athlete	Event	Distance	Position	Distance	Position
Eric Favors	Shot put	19.76	20	Did not advance	
John Kelly	Shot put	17.92	29	Did not advance	

=== Women ===
Track and road events

Athlete	Event	Heat		Semi-final		Final	
Athlete	Event	Result	Rank	Result	Rank	Result	Rank
Rhasidat Adeleke	400 m	51.59	2 Q	50.81	4	Did not advance	
Sophie Becker	400 m	52.24	5	Did not advance			
Louise Shanahan	800 m	2:01.71	5	Did not advance			
Sarah Healy	1500 m	4:11.31	12	Did not advance			
Sarah Lavin	100 m hurdles	12.99	3 Q	12.87	5	Did not advance	
Joan Healy; Adeyemi Talabi; Lauren Roy; Sarah Leahy	4 × 100 m relay	44.48	8	—N/a		Did not advance	

=== Mixed ===
Athlete	Event	Heat		Semi-final		Final	
Athlete	Event	Result	Rank	Result	Rank	Result	Rank
Christopher O'Donnell; Sophie Becker; Jack Raftery; Rhasidat Adeleke*; Sharlene Mawdsley	4 × 400 m relay	3:13.88 SB	2 Q	—N/a		3:16.86	8

* – Indicates the athlete competed in preliminaries but not the final
