= 2005 European Athletics Indoor Championships – Men's 3000 metres =

The Men's 3000 metres event at the 2005 European Athletics Indoor Championships was held on March 4–5.

== Medalists ==
Gold	Silver	Bronze
Alistair Cragg; Ireland	John Mayock; Great Britain	Reyes Estévez; Spain

== Results ==
=== Heats ===
First 4 of each heat (Q) and the next 4 fastest (q) qualified for the final.

Rank	Heat	Name	Nationality	Time	Notes
1	2	Reyes Estévez	Spain	7:54.63	Q
2	2	John Mayock	Great Britain	7:54.83	Q, SB
3	1	Alistair Cragg	Ireland	7:54.91	Q
4	2	Günther Weidlinger	Austria	7:54.94	Q
5	1	Mo Farah	Great Britain	7:54.99	Q, PB
6	2	Mark Carroll	Ireland	7:55.18	Q
7	1	Mokhtar Benhari	France	7:55.34	Q
8	1	Sergey Ivanov	Russia	7:55.51	Q, PB
9	2	Pavel Shapovalov	Russia	7:55.78	q
10	1	Pavel Naumov	Russia	7:56.66	q
11	1	Martin Pröll	Austria	7:58.45	q
12	2	Henrik Skoog	Sweden	7:58.82	q
13	1	Erik Sjöqvist	Sweden	7:59.71	
14	2	Vincent Le Dauphin	France	8:00.07	
15	1	Francisco Javier Alves	Spain	8:01.22	
16	1	Antonio David Jiménez	Spain	8:04.44	
17	2	Cosimo Caliandro	Italy	8:09.93	
18	2	Andy Baddeley	Great Britain	8:11.20	
	2	Boštjan Buč	Slovenia	DNF	

=== Final ===
Rank	Name	Nationality	Time	Notes
1st place, gold medalist(s)	Alistair Cragg	Ireland	7:46.32	
2nd place, silver medalist(s)	John Mayock	Great Britain	7:51.46	SB
3rd place, bronze medalist(s)	Reyes Estévez	Spain	7:51.65	
4	Günther Weidlinger	Austria	7:52.35	
5	Pavel Shapovalov	Russia	7:53.95	
6	Mo Farah	Great Britain	7:54.08	PB
7	Mokhtar Benhari	France	7:57.27	
8	Martin Pröll	Austria	7:57.37	
9	Mark Carroll	Ireland	7:57.56	
10	Henrik Skoog	Sweden	7:58.02	
11	Pavel Naumov	Russia	8:06.38	
12	Sergey Ivanov	Russia	8:14.97	
