= Marian Heffernan =

Irish sprinter

Personal information
- Born: 16 April 1982 (age 43)
- Height: 1.71 m (5 ft 7 1/2 in)
- Weight: 63 kg (139 lb)

Sport
- Country: Ireland
- Sport: Athletics
- Event: 4 × 400m Relay

Marian Heffernan (born 16 April 1982) is an Irish athlete who competed in the women's 4 × 400 metres relay at the 2012 Summer Olympics. Heffernan is fifth in the all-time Irish record books for the women's 400 metres.

She is married to Irish Olympic race walker Rob Heffernan, with whom she has a son, Cathal, who is a footballer.
