= Cathal Heffernan =

Irish footballer (born 2005)

- Heffernan with Cambridge United in 2026

Personal information
- Full name: Cathal Séan Heffernan Andrews
- Date of birth: 27 April 2005 (age 21)
- Place of birth: Cork, Ireland
- Position: Centre-back

Team information
- Current team: Cambridge United
- Number: 15

Youth career
- –2019: Ringmahon Rangers
- 2019–2021: Cork City

Senior career*
| Years | Team | Apps | (Gls) |
| 2021–2022 | Cork City | 1 | (0) |
| 2022 | → AC Milan (loan) | 0 | (0) |
| 2022–2023 | AC Milan | 0 | (0) |
| 2023–2026 | Newcastle United | 0 | (0) |
| 2026 | Harrogate Town | 24 | (2) |
| 2026– | Cambridge United | 13 | (0) |

International career^{‡}
- Republic of Ireland U15
- Republic of Ireland U16
- Republic of Ireland U17
- Republic of Ireland U18
- Republic of Ireland U19
- * Club domestic league appearances and goals as of 11:28, 22 November 2026 (UTC) ‡ National team caps and goals as of 14:49, 16 October 2025 (UTC)

Cathal Séan Heffernan Andrews (born 27 April 2005) is an Irish footballer who plays as a centre-back for Cambridge United.

== Early and personal life ==
Heffernan was born in Cork. His father Rob and mother Marian are both Olympians, in race walking and 400m relay respectively.

== Club career ==
Heffernan began his career with Ringmahon Rangers, signing for Cork City in 2019. He made his senior debut for Cork City in the 2021 season. In March 2021 he trained with Italian clubs Juventus, AC Milan, Roma and Atalanta, and turned professional with Cork in June 2021.

He moved on loan to AC Milan in January 2022. He made his debut for Milan's under-18 team a few days later. In May 2022 he made his debut for the under-19 team.

His transfer to Milan was made permanent in June 2022. He joined English club Newcastle United in August 2023.

On 14 January 2026, Heffernan signed an 18-month contract with EFL League Two side Harrogate Town.

In August 2026 he signed for Cambridge United.

== International career ==
Heffernan has played for the Republic of Ireland at under-15, under-16, under-17, under-18 and under-19 level.

== Career statistics ==
As of match played 21 November 2026

Appearances and goals by club, season and competition
| Club | Season | League | | | National cup (Note: Includes FAI Cup) | | League cup | | Other | | Total | |
| Club | Season | Division | Apps | Goals | Apps | Goals | Apps | Goals | Apps | Goals | Apps | Goals |
|---|---|---|---|---|---|---|---|---|---|---|---|---|
| Cork City | 2021 | LOI First Division | 1 | 0 | 0 | 0 | — | | — | | 1 | 0 |
| Newcastle United U21 | 2023–24 | — | — | | — | | — | | 1 (Note: Appearance(s) in the EFL Trophy) | 0 | 1 | 0 |
| Newcastle United U21 | 2024–25 | — | — | | — | | — | | 3 | 0 | 2 | 0 |
| Newcastle United U21 | 2025–26 | — | — | | — | | — | | 3 | 1 | 3 | 1 |
| Newcastle United U21 | Total | | — | | — | | — | | 6 | 1 | 6 | 1 |
| Harrogate Town | 2025–26 | League Two | 21 | 1 | 0 | 0 | 0 | 0 | 0 | 0 | 21 | 1 |
| Harrogate Town | 2026–27 | National League | 3 | 1 | 0 | 0 | — | | 0 | 0 | 3 | 1 |
| Harrogate Town | Total | | 24 | 2 | 0 | 0 | 0 | 0 | 0 | 0 | 24 | 2 |
| Cambridge United | 2026–27 | League One | 13 | 0 | 1 | 0 | 0 | 0 | 3 | 0 | 17 | 0 |
| Career total | | | 38 | 2 | 1 | 0 | 0 | 0 | 9 | 1 | 48 | 2 |
