= Fearghal Curtin =

Irish long-distance runner (born 1998)

Personal information
- Born: 14 July 1998 (age 27)

Sport
- Sport: Athletics
- Event: Long distance running

Achievements and titles
- Personal bests: Half marathon: 1:00:22 (Copenhagen, 2025) NR; Marathon: (Gyeongju, 2025) 2:07:54

Fearghal Curtin (born 14 July 1998) is an Irish long-distance runner. He became the Irish national record holder for the half marathon and the marathon in 2025.

== Biography ==
From Youghal, County Cork, Curtin is a member of Youghal Athletics Club, and also spent time in the American collegiate system with Arizona State University, Charleston Southern University and Florida State University. He later based himself in Cardiff, Wales, in Portugal, and also returned to train at altitude in Flagstaff, Arizona.

He competed for Ireland at the 2023 European Games, placing third over 5000 metres as Ireland won the Third Division title.

Curtin made his debut in the marathon in April 2025, and moved to tenth on the Irish all-time list with a time of 2:11.35. He then broke the Irish half marathon national record in September 2025, running a time of 1:00:22 in Copenhagen, Denmark, breaking the previous best time held by Efrem Gidey, by 29 seconds.

Curtin set a new Irish national record for the marathon when he won the Gyeongju International Marathon in South Korea on 18 October 2025, running a time of 2:07:54 to surpass the previous Irish record of 2:09:36, set by Peter Lynch at the Dusseldorf Marathon, six months previously. It was only his second competitive race at the distance, and his time was inside the automatic qualification standard for the 2026 European Athletics Championships in Birmingham. Lynch regained the national record at the 2026 London Marathon.
