= Ireland at the 2019 World Athletics Championships =

- WA code: IRL
- Website: www.athleticsireland.ie

in Doha, Qatar 27 September 2019 – 6 October 2019
- Competitors: 8 in 8 events
- Medals: Gold 0 Silver 0 Bronze 0 Total 0

World Athletics Championships appearances
- 1980; 1983; 1987; 1991; 1993; 1995; 1997; 1999; 2001; 2003; 2005; 2007; 2009; 2011; 2013; 2015; 2017; 2019; 2022; 2023

Ireland competed at the 2019 World Athletics Championships in Doha, Qatar, from 27 September to 6 October 2019.

== Results ==
Key

- Q = Qualified for the next round
- q = Qualified for the next round as a fastest loser or, in field events, by position without achieving the qualifying target
- NR = National record
- PB = Personal best
- SB = Season best
- N/A = Round not applicable for the event

=== Men ===
Track and road events

| Athlete | Event | Heat | | Semifinal | | Final | |
| Athlete | Event | Result | Rank | Result | Rank | Result | Rank |
|---|---|---|---|---|---|---|---|
| Mark English | 800 metres | 1:47.25 | 32 | Did not advance | | | |
| Stephen Scullion | Marathon | — | | | | 2:21:31 | 43 |
| Thomas Barr | 400 metres hurdles | 49.41 | 5 Q | 49.02 SB | 11 | Did not advance | |
| Alex Wright | 20 kilometres walk | — | | | | 1:37:33 | 31 |
| Brendan Boyce | 50 kilometres walk | — | | | | 4:07:46 | 6 |

=== Women ===
Track and road events

| Athlete | Event | Heat | | Semifinal | | Final | |
| Athlete | Event | Result | Rank | Result | Rank | Result | Rank |
|---|---|---|---|---|---|---|---|
| Phil Healy | 200 metres | 23.56 | 37 | Did not advance | | | |
| Ciara Mageean | 1500 metres | 4:04.18 | 5 Q | 4:15.49 | 16 Q | 4:00.15 PB | 10 |
| Michelle Finn | 3000 metres steeplechase | 9:47.44 | 30 | — | | Did not advance | |
