= Kate Veale =

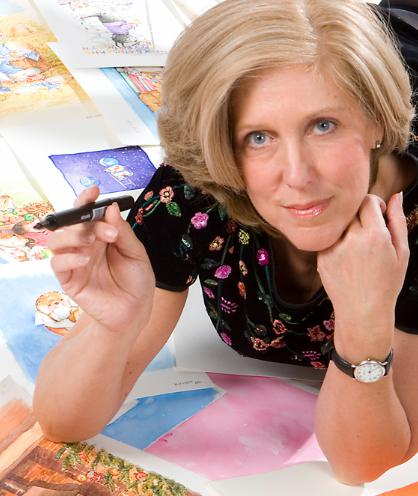
Kate Veale

Kate Veale writes and illustrates children's books. She is the creator of the Mr. Moon series that aired on the Playhouse Disney channel from 2010 to 2011.

== Background ==
Veale was born in Breaston, Derbyshire and was consumed by drawing, painting and writing from a very early age. As a child she was encouraged to make her own Christmas cards by artistic parents Michael and Vivienne. She has three brothers Carl, Ben and Oliver (Carl 1956–2018) Her love of the countryside and the natural world developed from long holidays staying with the Suttons, family friends who lived near Ditcheat in Somerset. The whole family would be invited to stay in the Suttons'old stone farmhouse, surrounded by countryside, where Veale and her brothers would spend much of their holidays. The whole family developed a great interest in wildlife.

== Education and early career ==
At school Veale's artistic ability was noticed and encouraged and she sold her first paintings during her school days.

Veale showed academic promise and passed her Oxford entrance exam before sitting her A levels. She went to Durham University but quickly realised that her passion for art overwhelmed other interests. She left Durham after one year so that she could follow her desire to paint and write.

Her first commercial studio experience was with Jay Advertising, a small studio in Leicestershire where she started as a freelance artist. Although Veale appreciated the experience she found the very commercial aspect of the work difficult to come to terms with because it restrained her imagination. However it was invaluable experience and taught her important technical and commercial aspects.

Veale also produced work for Sharpe's Classic and some nature studies for Royle Publications around this time. At 19 years of age she was spotted by Rowland Hilder who was on the board at Royle. He had been impressed by an illustration of a rabbit with young which Veale had submitted and which was subsequently published. He gave her advice and encouraged her to never stop drawing and painting as he considered her talent to be exceptional. His advice stayed with her. Hilder also gave Veale tutorial advice which helped her enormously.

Veale produced a series of designs for Elgin Court and Gordon Fraser which became best sellers. When Gordon Fraser was taken over by Andrew Brownsword in 1989 Brownsword focused on the best selling artists work and Brownsword and Veale created Country Companions, which became a global success. Veale drew inspiration for the Country Companions characters from her childhood holidays in Somerset with her brothers and parents at the Sutton's farm-house. Country Companions became a huge success in the UK and around the world, with Veale creating hundreds of artworks and designs.

Veale also created Oliver Otter and Friends, working directly with several large retailers including WHS, Mothercare, Safeway, Boots, and many other retailers and suppliers on the merchandising and licensing for the concept.

In 2000 Veale created the concept 'Mr Moon'. After a lucky meeting with one of the executives on the Universal Studios stand at the Frankfurt Book Fair who pointed Veale in the direction of UK production studios, 'Mr Moon' was commissioned as a tripartite co-production between UK, Canada and Singapore of 52 episodes of CGI animation.The co-producers were Skaramoosh London, Sparky Animation and Title Entertainment.The series was first broadcast in UK by Play-Disney in 2010. Veale is the creator of the series, the art director and the underlying Rights Holder of the concept and characters.

== Bibliography ==
Mr Moon

- 2000: Mr Moon Opens the Secret Door
- 2000: Mr Moon and the Ugly Alien
- 2000: Mr Moon and the Blackcurrant Rain Cloud
- 2000: Mr Moon Visits Earth

Oliver Otter and Friends

- 1996: Did You Swim Today, Oliver Otter?
- 1996: Follow the Trail, Digsby the Mole
- 1996: Will Squirrel's Big Fizz
- 1996: Drew the Shrew and the Star
- 1996: Watch Out For Father Christmas

Country Companions

- 1993: A Day in the Life of Sam Rabbit
- 1993: A Day in the Life of Edward Hedgehog
- 1993: A Day in the Life of Tom Mouse
- 1993: A Day in the Life of Badger
- 1992: What Happened to Edward Hedgehog One Winter
