= Róisín Harrison =

Irish athlete (born 1996)

Personal information
- Nationality: Irish
- Born: 10 October 1996 (age 29)

Sport
- Sport: Athletics
- Event: 400 metres

Achievements and titles
- Personal best(s): 400 metres: 52.53 (Geneva, 2023

Róisín Harrison (born 10 October 1996) is an Irish track and field athlete who predominately competes in the 400 metres. She has represented Ireland at the World Athletics Championships and the World Athletics Indoor Championships in the women's 4 × 400 metres relay.

== Career ==
Harrison runs for Emerald Athletics Club, in Limerick. She was part of the Irish 4 × 400 metres women's relay team that set a national record of 3:30.97 at the 2022 World Athletics Indoor Championships, in Belgrade, Serbia in March 2022, running alongside Sophie Becker, Sharlene Mawdsley, and Phil Healy.

In June 2023, in Geneva, Switzerland, she ran a personal best time of 52.53 seconds for the 400 metres. That month, Harrison was part of a triumphant Irish mixed 4 × 400 m team that won their Division Three race at the European Team Championships in Chorzów, Poland, helping Ireland to secure promotion to Division Two.

She was part of the Irish women's relay team that qualified for the final of the women's 4 × 400 m relay in Budapest, Hungary at the 2023 World Athletics Championships, alongside Becker, Kelly McGrory and Mawdsley. In the semi-final, they ran a seasons best time of 3:26.18.

She ran at the 2024 World Athletics Indoor Championships as part of the Irish women's 4 × 400 m relay team which reached the final in Glasgow, Scotland.

In April 2024, she was selected as part of the Irish team for the 2024 World Athletics Relays in Nassau, Bahamas. She was subsequently named as part of the Irish relay pool for the 2024 Olympic Games in Paris, France.

== Personal life ==
She attended the University of Limerick.
