= Peter Lynch (runner) =

Irish long-distance runner

Personal information
- Born: 26 November 1997 (age 28)

Sport
- Sport: Athletics
- Event: Long distance running

Achievements and titles
- Personal bests: Marathon 2:06:08 (London, 2026) NR

Peter Lynch (born 26 November 1997) is an Irish long-distance runner. He represented Ireland at the 2025 World Championships in the marathon. That year, he also held the Irish national record at the distance for the first time, and regained it in 2026 with 2:06:08 at the London Marathon.

== Biography ==
Lynch is from Kilkenny and is a member of Kilkenny City Harriers. He was educated at the University of Tulsa in the United States. He later became part of the Puma Elite Running Team in North Carolina under head coach Alistair Cragg.

Lynch placed third at the Irish Cross Country Championships in Donegal in November 2022. He then ran for Ireland at the 2022 European Cross Country Championships in Turin, Italy, where he was the first Irish finisher in fifteenth place.

Lynch represented Ireland over 10,000 metres at the 2024 European Athletics Championships in Rome, Italy in June 2024. After which, he moved to North Carolina in the United States to train with Alistair Cragg’s Puma Elite training group. He subsequently set a new Irish record over 10 miles, whilst competing in Washington.

Lynch made a 2:17:40 marathon debut in Chicago in 2024, before running a half marathon personal best of 61:15 in Houston in January 2025. In April 2025, Lynch set a new Irish national record for the marathon of 2:09:36 in placing third at the Düsseldorf Marathon in Germany, finishing one place ahead of compatriot Fearghal Curtin. Curtin would go on to set a new Irish record six months later. Lynch placed twenty-fourth overall in the men's marathon at the 2025 World Athletics Championships in Tokyo, Japan.

Lynch ran 59:52 to place fifth on the point-to-point course at the New York City Half Marathon in March 2026, the first Irishman to break the hour mark for the distance. The following month, Lynch had a top-ten finish at the 2026 London Marathon, running a new Irish record of 2:06:08 behind Sabastian Sawe as he ran a world record 1:59:30.
