= Thomas Chamney =

Irish runner

- Born: 16 April 1984 (age 42); Clonmel, Ireland
- Other names: The Chamdawg; Chammers; Madra
- Occupation: Athlete

Thomas Chamney (born 16 April 1984) is an Irish runner who was born in Clonmel and brought up in Dublin. He specialises in the 800 metres event. He was educated at Kilkenny College and at Saint Columba's College, Dublin. Chamney runs for the Crusaders AC club whilst in Dublin and has been on an athletics scholarship at the University of Notre Dame, South Bend, Indiana where he studied English from 2002 to 2007. He is a four-time Irish Senior 800m champion and competed at the Beijing Olympics in that event in 2008.

== On the field accolades ==
In 2006, Chamney earned All-America honours at the NCAA Indoor Championships, picking up his first career citation with a sixth-place finish in the 800-metre run at the Randall Tyson Track Center in Fayetteville, Arkansas. Chamney repeated his performance that spring at the NCAA Outdoor Championships in Sacramento, California, again finishing sixth and picking up All-America honours. This winter, Chamney became a three-time All-American with his performance in the NCAA Indoor Championships.

In international competition, Chamney has represented Ireland in the 800 metres at the European Athletics Championship in 2006 and at the European Indoor Championship in 2007. Chamney is a former Irish U23 800m champion and was 5th in the 2005 European U23 Championship when he recorded a personal best time of 1:46.82.

== Off-the-field notoriety ==
Chamney developed a cult following on the Internet amongst both track fans and non-fans when he began posting training journals on the college track and field site TrackShark.com.

An English major at the University of Notre Dame, Chamney was able to use his literary talents and his personality to build a loyal fanbase of American readers who appreciated his humor. Chamney's entries were generally quite a lengthy fictionalised version of events written in an Irish vernacular, drawing inspiration from a similar column in Dublin's Sunday Tribune. Chamney's last journal entry was written on 23 February 2006. In a 2007 interview with TrackShark.com, Chamney stated that he enjoyed writing because of the positive feedback and widespread praise that it drew from his fans, but stopped writing them because he felt slighted by those who accused him of exploiting the literary styles of some notable Irish columnists.

== Post-collegiate career ==
Having graduated the University of Notre Dame in May 2007, Chamney trained briefly in Soria, Spain, with coach Enrique Pascual before moving to Tallahassee, Florida, to prepare for the 2008 Beijing Olympics. In somewhat controversial circumstances, Chamney was selected for those Olympic Games having only attained the B standard for the 800m when he ran 1:46.66 at a meeting in Lignano, Italy. At those Olympic Games, he placed 5th in his heat in a time of 1:47.66 and failed to progress to the semi-finals.

After the Beijing Olympics Chamney moved to Limerick, Ireland. He has since competed at the 2009 World Athletics Championships in Berlin over the 800m and the 1500m as well as the 2010 European Championships in Barcelona over 1500m. At both those competitions he failed to qualify for the final. He lowered his personal bests to 1:45.41 (Bislett Games, Oslo, 2009) and 3:36.83 (Meeting Ciutat de Barcelona, 2010). He retired from competitive athletics in 2013 and now runs a restaurant chain in Gothenburg, Sweden.
