= Candice McLeod =

Jamaican athlete (born 1996)

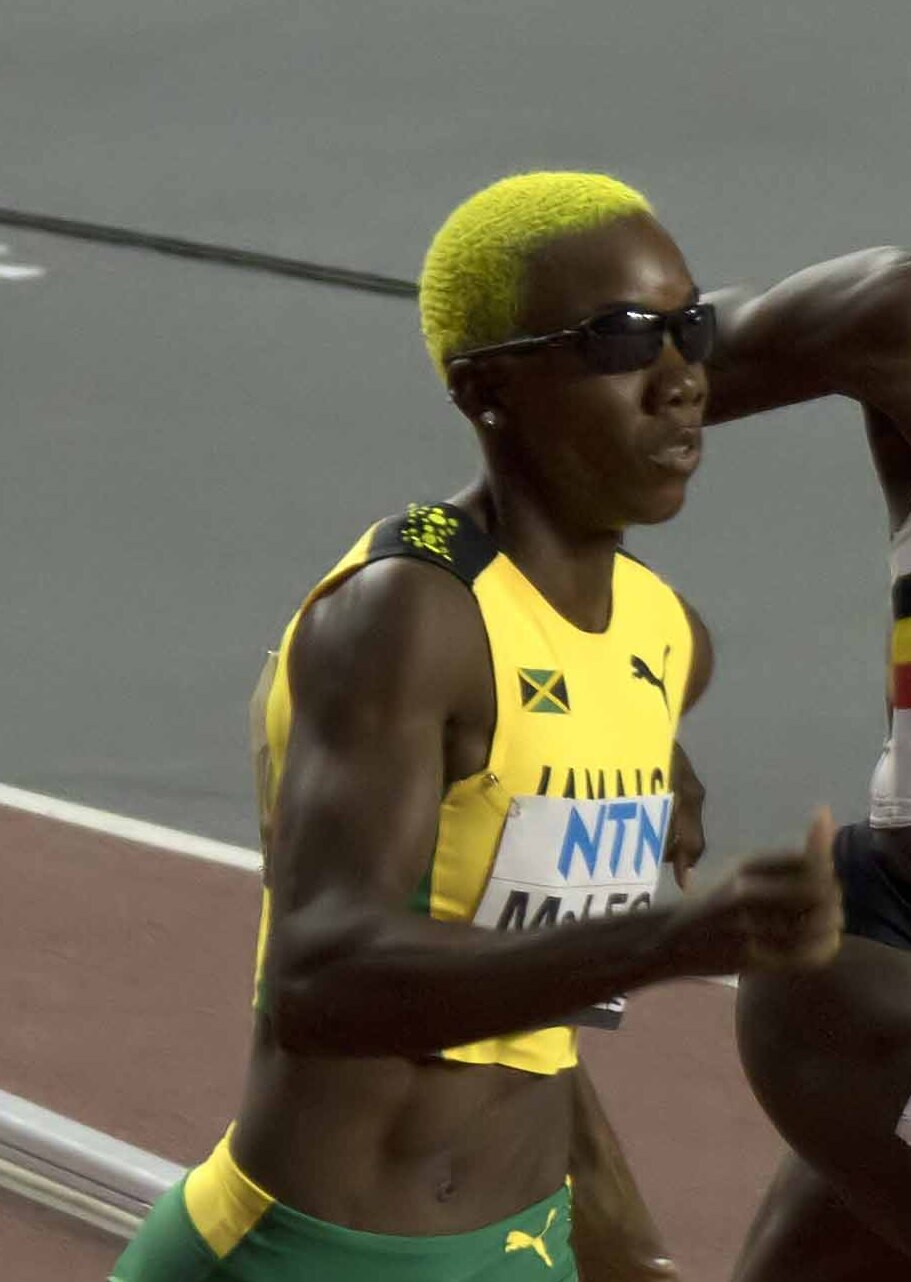
- McLeod competing at the 2023 World Athletics Championships

Personal information
- Nationality: Jamaican
- Born: November 15, 1996 (age 29)
- Education: University of the West Indies

Sport
- Sport: Track and field
- Event: 400 m
- Club: Uptimum
- Coached by: Shanikie Osbourne

Achievements and titles
- Personal best: 400 m: 49.51 (2021)
Medal record
Women's athletics
Representing Jamaica
Olympic Games
Bronze medal – third place	2020 Tokyo	4×400 m relay
World Championships
Silver medal – second place	2022 Eugene	4×400 m relay
Silver medal – second place	2023 Budapest	4×400 m relay
Pan American U20 Athletics Championships
Silver medal – second place	2015 Edmonton	4×400 m relay

Candice McLeod (born 15 November 1996) is a Jamaican athlete, a finalist in the women's 400 metres races at the 2020 Olympic Games and the 2022 World Athletics Championships.

== Early and personal life ==
McLeod attended Vere Technical High School where she was befriended and mentored by future athletics champion Shericka Jackson, before McLeod went on to become an accounting graduate from the University of West Indies.

== Career ==
At the Jamaican Olympic Trials, in June 2021, McLeod lowered her personal best time for a sixth time in a year, running 49.91 seconds in the 400 metres to finish second behind Stephenie Ann McPherson. This secured McLeod's slot on the Jamaican team for the delayed 2020 Summer Games.

In the 400 metres races at the Tokyo Olympics McLeod won her heat, and then ran a new personal best time of 49.51 seconds in her semi final and qualified for the final in which she finished in fifth place. At the 2022 World Athletics Championships McLeod matched the feat of reaching the final. She won a silver medal in the women's 4 × 400 metres relay.

== International competitions ==
Year	Competition	Venue	Position	Event	Notes
Representing Jamaica
2015	Pan American Junior Championships	Edmonton, Canada	4th (h)	400 m	54.59
2015	Pan American Junior Championships	Edmonton, Canada	2nd	4 × 400 m relay	3:38.77
2021	Olympic Games	Tokyo, Japan	5th	400 m	49.87
2021	Olympic Games	Tokyo, Japan	3rd	4 × 400 m relay	3:21.24
2022	World Championships	Eugene, United States	7th	400 m	50.78
2022	World Championships	Eugene, United States	2nd	4 × 400 m relay	3:20.74
2023	World Championships	Budapest, Hungary	7th	400 m	51.08
2023	World Championships	Budapest, Hungary	2nd	4 × 400 m relay	3:20.88
