= Luke McCann =

Irish track and field athlete (born 1998)

Personal information
- Nationality: Irish
- Born: 12 March 1998 (age 28)
- Education: Masters in Mechanical Engineering with Business, University College Dublin, 2023
- Height: 190 cm (6 ft 3 in)
- Weight: 78 kg (172 lb)

Sport
- Sport: Athletics
- Event: Middle-distance running
- Team: OAC Europe

Achievements and titles
- Personal bests: 800m: 1:45.33 (Bellinzona, 2024); 1000m: 2:16.40 NR (Monaco, 2022); 1500m: 3:33.66 (Stockholm, 2024); Mile: 3:52.70 (Copenhagen, 2024)

Luke McCann (born 12 March 1998) is an Irish middle distance track and field athlete from Glenageary, Dublin who specialises in the 1500 metres. He represented Ireland at the 2024 Paris Olympics. He holds two Irish records over 1000 metres.

== Biography ==
In May 2021, in Ostrava McCann lowered his 1500m personal best to 3:37.77. The following week, he lowered it again to 3:36.81 in Montreuil.

In February 2022, he claimed the Irish indoor record over 1000 metres, in Kentucky. McCann signed a professional contract with On to compete for OAC Europe in June 2022. In August 2022, McCann set a new Irish national record over 1000 metres outdoors, running 2:16.40 at the Diamond League event in Monaco, a record which would stand for four years until surpassed by Mark English in 2026. McCann qualified for the 2022 World Athletics Championships in Eugene, Oregon through his ranking, however the Irish Athletics Association controversially chose not to select him.

In March 2023, he qualified from the semi-finals of the 1500m at the 2023 European Athletics Indoors Championships in Istanbul. He finished tenth in the final. In August 2023, he was named as part of the Irish team for the 2023 World Athletics Championships in Budapest.

In May 2024, he ran a 3:34.32 personal best for the 1500 metres in Ostrava. He finished second in the 1500 metres at the 2024 BAUHAUS-galan in Stockholm on 2 June 2024 to set a new personal best of 3:33.66. He was selected for the Irish team for the 2024 European Athletics Championships in June 2024. Later that month, he was runner-up at the Irish Championships in Dublin in the 1500 metres race. He represented Ireland in Paris at the 2024 Summer Olympics over 1500 metres. In September 2024, he lowered his 800 metres personal best to 1:45.33 in Bellinzona, putting him fourth on the Irish all-time list.

Having first felt pain in his knee prior to the 2024 Olympics, McCann was diagnosed with Osteochondritis dissecans and had an extended period away from competition due to the injury that required surgery in November 2024 and ruled him out for the entirety of the 2025 season. He returned in Dortmund at the Sparkassen Indoor Meeting, a World Athletics Indoor Tour Bronze event in February 2026, competing in the 1500m with a time of 3:40.85. That month, McCann had a win at the World Indoor Tour Challenger meeting. in Ourense, Spain, running an indoor 800m personal best of 1:47.64 to take victory. On 1 March, he was runner-up to Lughaidh Mallon at the Irish Indoor Athletics Championships in the 1500 metres.

== Personal life ==
McCann was awarded a UCD Ad Astra Elite Athlete Scholarship and graduated from University College Dublin with a Masters in Mechanical Engineering with Business. His sister Jodie McCann is also a distance runner who has represented Ireland.
