= Kelly McGrory =

Irish athlete (born 1996)

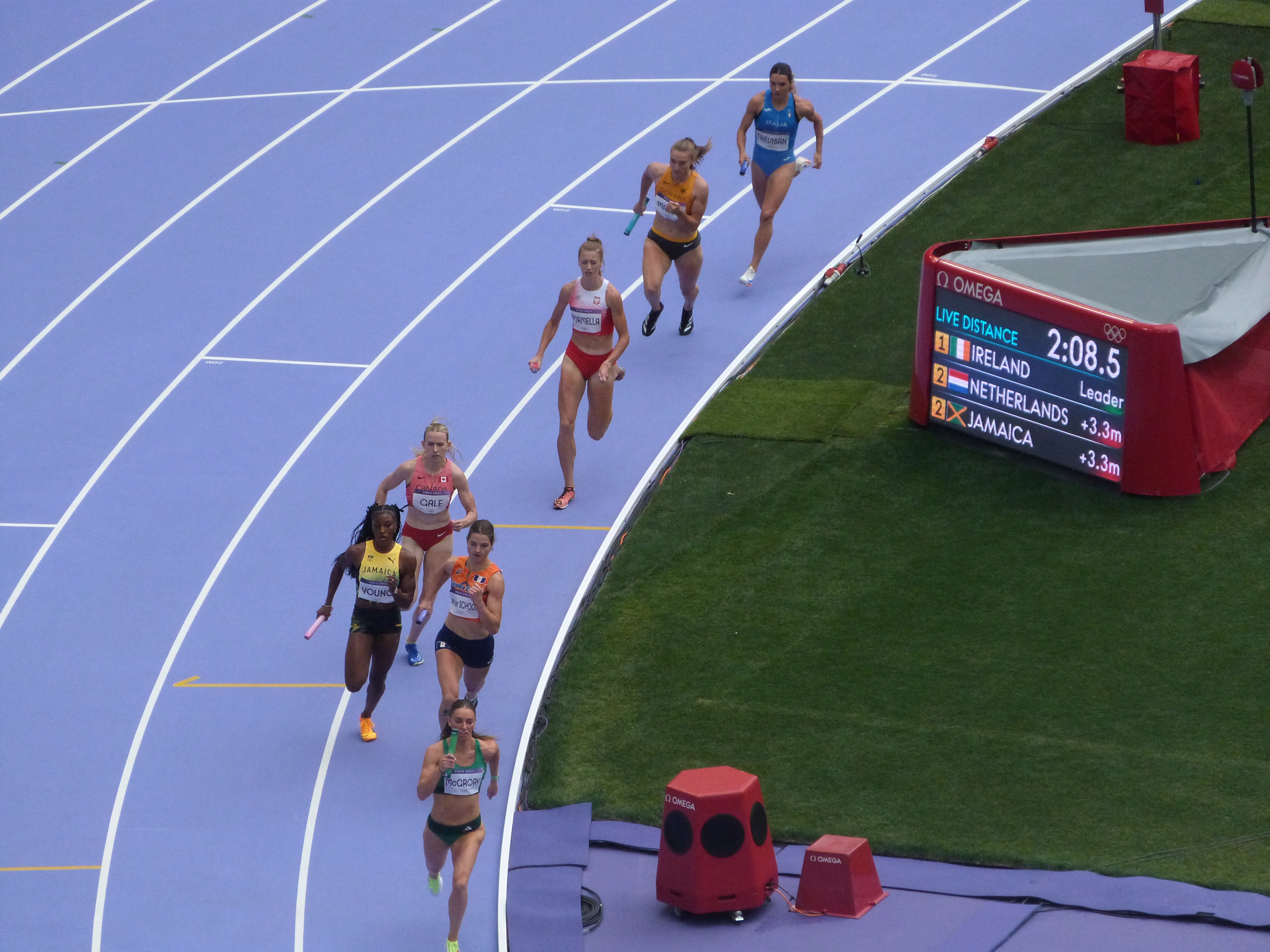
- Competing at the 2024 Olympic Games

Personal information
- Nationality: Irish
- Born: 24 December 1996 (age 29) Sligo, Ireland

Sport
- Sport: Athletics
- Event: 400 metres hurdles

Achievements and titles
- Personal bests: 400 metres: 54.21 (Belfast, 2023; 400 metres hurdles: 57.22 (Dublin, 2022)

Kelly McGrory (born 24 December 1996) is an Irish track and field athlete. She is a multiple time Irish national champion in the 400 metres hurdles. She also represented Ireland at the 2023 World Athletics Championships and the 2024 Olympic Games in the women's 4 x 400 metres relay.

== Career ==
From Laghy, County Donegal she runs for Tir Chonaill Athletics Club. She won the 400 metres hurdles title at the Irish Athletics Championships At Abbotstown, running a time of 59.41 seconds.

In July 2022, she ran a new personal best time of 57.22 for the 400 metres hurdles as she retained her Irish national championship title in Dublin. The following week she set a new Donegal record for the 400 metres, running 54.68 at The Morton Games. In May 2023, she lowered her 400 metres personal best to 54.21 seconds in Belfast.

In July 2023 in Dublin, she won her third consecutive Irish national title in the 400 metres hurdles. The following month, she was a late replacement for a fatigued Rhasidat Adeleke who finished fourth in the individual 400 metres, for the Irish women's metres relay team that qualified for the final of the women's 4 × 400 m relay at the 2023 World Athletics Championships, in Budapest, alongside Sophie Becker, Róisín Harrison and Sharlene Mawdsley. In the semi final they ran a seasons best time of 3:26.18.

She competed in the women's 4 x 400 metres relay at the 2024 Paris Olympics, running in the qualifying heats alongside Becker, Mawdsley and Phil Healey, to help the Irish team qualify for the final.

== Personal life ==
She is in a relationship with fellow runner Thomas Barr.
