= Alistair Cragg =

South African long-distance runner (born 1980)

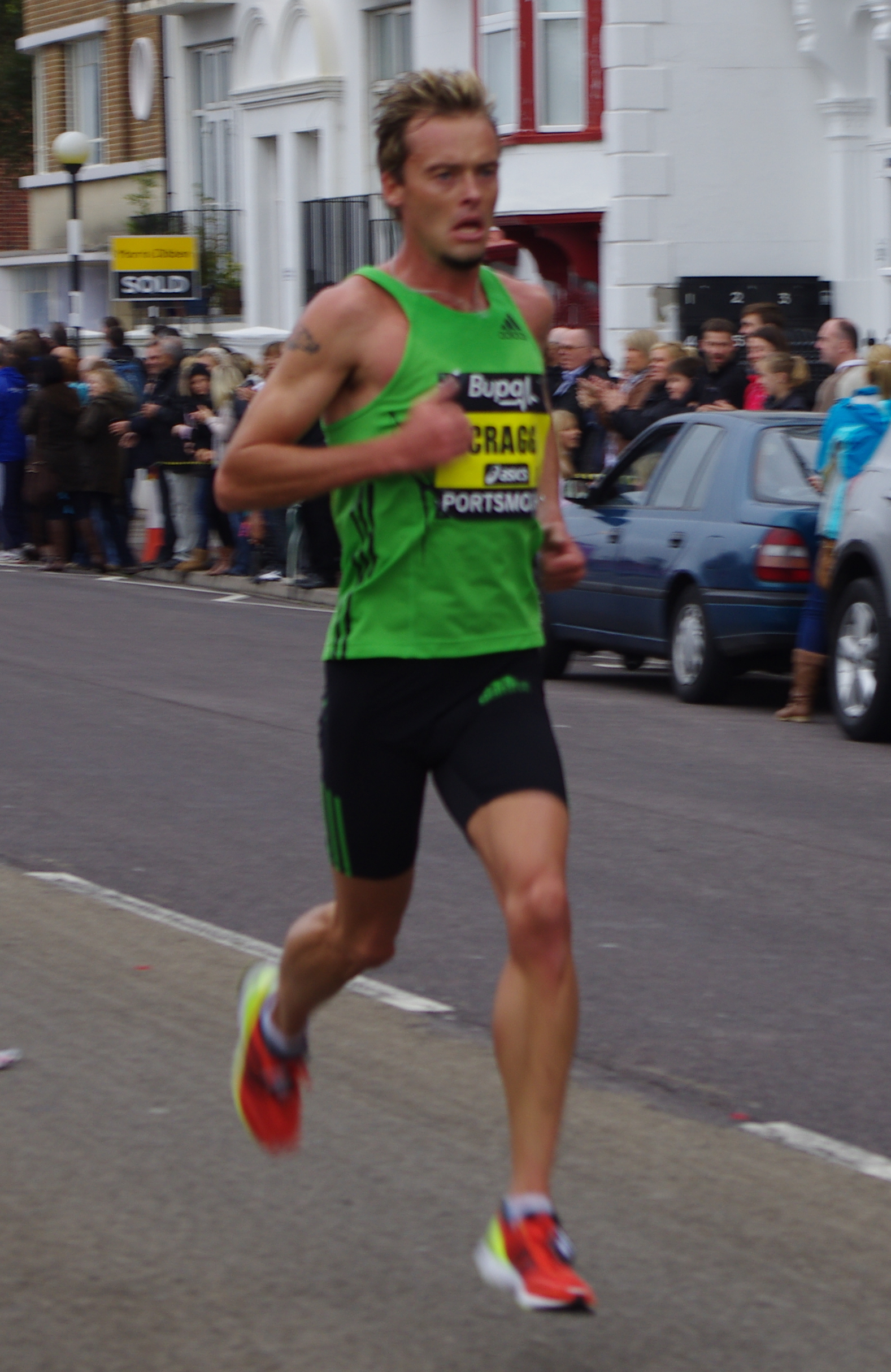

Personal information
- Full name: Alistair Ian Cragg
- Born: 13 June 1980 (age 46) Johannesburg, South Africa
Medal record
Men's athletics
Representing Ireland
European Indoor Championships
Gold medal – first place	2005 Madrid	3000 m

Alistair Ian Cragg (born 13 June 1980 in Johannesburg) is a South African track and field athlete. He has since lived in England and United States where he attended the University of Arkansas. He races for Ireland and competes most often over 3000 metres and 5000 metres. He holds the Irish national records in both the 5000 metres and the 10,000 metres. He holds the European road running record in the 5 km in 13:26, set in Carlsbad, California.

== Career ==
=== College ===
Cragg's father was a coach in South Africa and now lives in Fayetteville, Arkansas with his wife. Alistair's older brother, Duncan, went to Southern Methodist University from 1994 to 1999. Alistair followed him there in 1999. His first cross country season there, he was injured and finished the season poorly at the regional meet in Denton, Texas. Arkansas coach John McDonnell saw him after the race and said something about how he should not run if he was injured. The next spring, Alistair was the top freshman finisher in the 5000 m at the NCAA Championship meet, smashing SMU freshman records in that event.

The following autumn, one of Cragg's brothers died and Alistair dropped out of SMU. After taking a year off, SMU had given away his scholarship and Alistair needed a new home. McDonnell made room for him on the Arkansas roster. Alistair had an outstanding college career with the Arkansas Razorbacks with McDonnell, winning individual NCAA titles at 3,000 m, 5,000 m and 10,000 m on the track, as well as indoor titles. In 2004, he was voted Southeastern Conference athlete of the year, and the Track and Field News magazine Collegiate Athlete of the Year.

Cragg is the University of Arkansas recordholder for 3,000 m and 5,000 m, and the only Razorback to win the 10,000, 5,000 and 1,500 meter races at a single SEC Outdoor Championship meet (2004) . He won seven NCAA championships while at the University of Arkansas including five indoors: 5000m (three straight from 2002 to 2004) and 3000m (2003 and 2004) and two outdoors: 10000m (2004) and 5000m (2003) .

=== Professional career ===
Cragg declared for Ireland in 2003, having represented South Africa as a junior athlete in a cross country race. He qualified for an Irish passport on the basis of his Irish ancestry and first obtained Irish nationality in 1985.

It was seen as a controversial move as he had never lived in the country and only first visited when he was 24 years old. He currently runs for Clonliffe Harriers, a club in Dublin.

Cragg made his début for Ireland at the 2003 European Cross Country Championships, where he finished a respectable 8th. In the 2004 Summer Olympics in Athens he finished as top European in the 5000 m at 12th place. Cragg won the gold medal in the 2005 European Indoor Championships for 3,000 m. Unfortunately for Cragg he could not build on this success as injury forced him to miss most of the outdoor season, including the 2005 IAAF Athletics World Championships.

Cragg began the 2006 season well and finished 4th in the World Indoor Championships, just missing out on a medal. He was one of the favourites to win a medal in the 5000 m at the European Championships, but dropped out whilst leading the slow run final with around 800 metres to go. It is believed he had suffered an Achilles tendon injury.

During the early part of the 2007 season, Cragg made Olympic 'A' standards for the 2008 Olympic Games in the 1500 metres, 5000 metres and 10,000 metres. Whilst recording the standard in the latter event, he broke the seven-year-old Irish record for the distance. Cragg finished second behind Cathal Lombard at the 2007 Irish Cross Country Championships, held in Belfast.

=== Beijing Olympics ===
In the 2008 Summer Olympics in Beijing, Cragg competed in the 1500 m and 5000 m track events. He failed to qualify from heat section in the 1500m, finishing 8th with a time of 3:44.90. In the first heat of the 5000 m, he finished sixth in his heat of the 5000 m with a time 13:38.57.

Immediately after this race, thinking he had failed to qualify, Cragg was emotional when he was interviewed about the pressures that are associated with being an Irish athlete. He criticized Irish media, who he said, place too many demands on track and field athletes, and the Irish public, for criticizing the Olympic team too hastily. He criticized Ireland's former middle-distance athletes for lambasting his performances, saying he could match the likes of Eamonn Coghlan and others in a race. Cragg sat by himself watching the other two heats, dejected at his performance. However, it turned out that he had qualified for his second Olympic final as a fastest loser, with the sixth fastest time of all the qualifiers. He went on to participate in the 5,000-metre final, but did not finish.

=== International Competition ===
In May 2009, he ran one of the best 5,000 metres of his career at the Adidas Track Classic in Carson, California in a time of 13:16.83. He also won the 2009 Irish 5000 m championship in August 2009.

He came second at the Rock 'n' Roll Arizona Half Marathon in January 2011 behind Australian Shawn Forrest.

=== Daegu, South Korea 13th IAAF World Championships in Athletics ===
He reached the 5000 m final at the 2011 World Championships in Athletics, but finished in fourteenth place overall.

=== Hometown ===
The following month he ran at the Great South Run and claimed third place due to his well-timed pacing.

=== London Olympics ===
Cragg again competed in the 5000m, finishing 17th in his heat with a time of 13:47.01. A female reporter for RTÉ asked him, "Realistically, should you have come to the Olympic Games?" Bernice Harrison, writing in The Irish Times, called this criticism "harsh".

=== 2013 Fukuoka Marathon ===
On 1 December, Alistair Cragg ran 2:23:05 and finished 26th.

== Post-racing career ==
Cragg last raced in 2014. Cragg married American distance runner Amy Cragg, winner of the marathon bronze at the 2017 World Championships. He became head coach for the Puma Elite Running Team in North Carolina, and coached athletes including Irish marathon record holder Peter Lynch.

== Major competition record ==
Year	Competition	Venue	Position	Event	Notes
2003	European Cross Country Championships	Edinburgh, Scotland	8th	9830 m	29:13
2004	World Cross Country Championships	Brussels, Belgium	16th	Short race	
2004	Olympic Games	Athens, Greece	12th	5000 m	
2005	European Indoor Championship	Madrid, Spain	1st	3000 m	7:46.32
2006	World Indoor Championships	Moscow, Russia	4th	3000 m	7:46.43
2006	European Championships	Gothenburg, Sweden	—	5000 m	DNF
2008	Olympic Games	Beijing, China	—	5000 m	DNF
2010	European Athletics Championships	Barcelona, Spain	—	5000 m	DNF
2011	World Athletics Championships	Daegu, South Korea	14th	5000 m	13:45.33
2012	Olympic Games	London, Great Britain	30th	5000 m	13:47.01 (h)

== Irish records ==
- 3,000 m indoors: 7:38.59 (14 February 2004 in Fayetteville)
- 5,000 m indoors: 13:28.93 (14 March 2003 in Fayetteville)
- 5,000 m outdoors: 13:03.53 (16 September 2011 in Brussels, Belgium)
- 10,000 m outdoors: 27.39.55 (29 April 2007 in Stanford, California)

== See also ==
- Ireland at the 2004 Summer Olympics
- Ireland at the 2006 European Championships in Athletics
- List of eligibility transfers in athletics
