= Colin Griffin =

Irish racewalker (born 1982)

Colin Griffin OLY
Personal information
- Nationality: Irish
- Born: 3 August 1982 (age 44) Ballinamore, County Leitrim, Ireland
- Height: 1.85 m (6 ft 1 in)
- Weight: 71 kg (157 lb)

Sport
- Sport: Athletics
- Event: 50km Race Walk
- Club: Ballinamore AC

Colin Griffin (born 3 August 1982) is an Irish race walker who has competed in two Olympic Games.

== Biography ==
Griffin is a race walker who competed at the 2008 and 2012 Olympic Games in the 50k walk.

Griffin spent a good number of years training in Limerick and Saluzzo, Italy. He coaches fellow County Leitrim athlete and Olympian Laura Reynolds who now does MMA. He is director of the Altitude Centre Ireland, a company that specialises in altitude training and simulated altitude equipment. (Note: The website of the Altitude Centre Ireland is here)

He returned home from an altitude training camp high in Sierra Nevada in Spain to win Athletics Ireland 10 km walk. It was his first national 10 km track title, winning in a time of 41.47.66 at Morton Stadium, Santry, Dublin.

Griffin was disqualified at the 38 km mark at the 2012 Olympics while he was in contention for a top 16 performance and a personal best time by several minutes. However, that same day Laura Reynolds, who he had coached, finished 20th in the women's 20 km walk in her first Olympic Games.

Griffin twice won the British AAA Championships title in 2005 and 2006.
