= Robert Heffernan =

Irish race walker

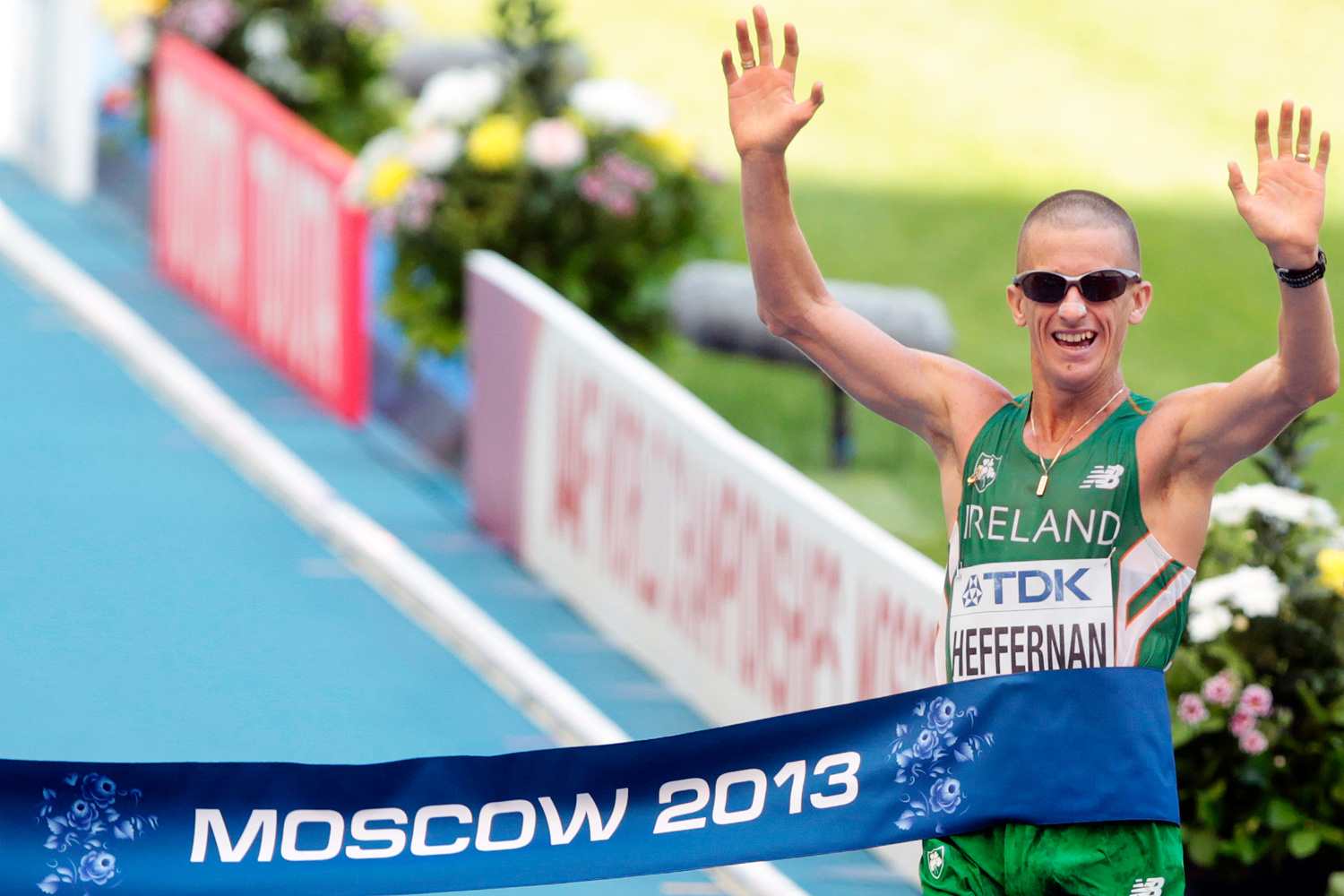
- Heffernan wins the World Championships of 2013 in Moscow

Personal information
- Born: 28 February 1978 (age 48) Cork, Ireland
- Height: 1.71 m (5 ft 7 1/2 in)
- Weight: 58 kg (128 lb)
- Spouse: Marian Heffernan

Sport
- Country: Ireland
- Sport: Racewalking
- Events: 20 km race walk, 50 km race walk

Achievements and titles
- Personal bests: 20 km: 1:19:22; 50 km: 3:37:54
Medal record
Men's athletics
Representing Ireland
Olympic Games
Bronze medal – third place	2012 London	50 km walk
World Championships
Gold medal – first place	2013 Moscow	50 km walk
European Championships
Bronze medal – third place	2010 Barcelona	20 km walk

Robert Heffernan (born 28 February 1978) is an Irish race walker.

== Career ==
At the 2000 Olympics he finished in 28th place in the 20 km walk, and at the 2004 Olympics he was disqualified.

At the 2008 Olympic Games he improved, coming eighth in the 20 km walk. His wife, Marian Andrews, is also national women's 400 metres champion and was on the Irish women's team that finished 4th in the European indoors. On 27 July 2010, Heffernan won the bronze medal in the 2010 European Athletics Championships in the 20 kilometres walk, posting a time of 1:21:00 (achieved retrospectively in 2014 after Russian Stanislav Emelyanov was found to have committed an anti-doping violation). He also finished 4th in the 50km walk in a national record time of 3:45:30, a notable achievement just three days after the 20 km event.

At the 2012 Olympics, Heffernan finished ninth in the 20km race. A week later he finished fourth in the 50km, finishing seven minutes faster than the previous national record. His achievements in London were the top two performances for the Irish Athletics team at the 2012 Olympics.

In early 2015, it was revealed that a number of Russian male and female champion racewalkers were under investigation for doping violations, including the winner of the 50 km walk in London, Sergey Kirdyapkin. The athlete was retrospectively suspended during specific periods between 2009 and 2012 by his federation (RUSADA) and had most of his results annulled—including world titles, but not his Olympic title.

The IAAF were unhappy with the verdict made by the Russian Athletics Federation and made it clear that they would be taking the case to the Court of Arbitration for Sport (CAS), believing that the ban should include his participation in the London Olympics. In a statement, the IAAF disagreed with the selective disqualification of results applied by RUSADA.

On 24 March 2016, the court of Arbitration for Sport favoured the IAAF, and Heffernan was upgraded to Olympic Bronze. He received his bronze medal in November 2016.

=== 2013 World championships ===
On 14 August 2013, Heffernan finished first in the 2013 World Championships in Athletics 50km event in Moscow, finishing over a minute clear of the silver medal position with a winning time of 3:37:56. Speaking after the race Heffernan said "Its surreal, it's just a great feeling," he said. "When I came into the stadium it just felt like an out-of-body experience. It's hard to take it all in at the moment. I'm delighted." The winning time was the fastest time in the world in 2013 by more than three minutes.

== Other work ==
In November 2022, Heffernan was announced as performance coach of the Cork senior footballers, working under the management of John Cleary.

== Performance at major championships ==
Year	Competition	Venue	Position	Event	Notes
Representing Ireland
1999	World Race Walking Cup	Mézidon-Canon, France	70th	20 km	1:32:14
1999	European U23 Championships	Göteborg, Sweden	13th	20 km	1:36:26
2000	European Race Walking Cup	Eisenhüttenstadt, Germany	18th	20 km	1:22:43
2000	Olympic Games	Sydney, Australia	28th	20 km	1:26:04
2001	European Race Walking Cup	Dudince, Slovakia	17th	20 km	1:23:57
2001	World Championships	Edmonton, Canada	14th	20 km	1:25:02
2002	European Championships	Munich, Germany	8th	20 km	1:21:10
2004	World Race Walking Cup	Naumburg, Germany	27th	20 km	1:22:58
2004	Olympic Games	Athens, Greece	—	20 km	DSQ
2005	World Championships	Helsinki, Finland	—	20 km	DSQ
2007	World Championships	Osaka, Japan	6th	20 km	1:23:42
2008	World Race Walking Cup	Cheboksary, Russia	9th	20 km	1:19:22 (PB)
2008	Olympic Games	Beijing, China	8th	20 km	1:20:36
2009	European Race Walking Cup	Metz, France	4th	20 km	1:25:21
2009	World Championships	Berlin, Germany	15th	20 km	1:22:09
2010	European Championships	Barcelona, Spain	3rd	20 km	1:21:00
2010	European Championships	Barcelona, Spain	4th	50 km	3:45:30
2011	European Race Walking Cup	Olhão, Portugal	9th	20 km	1:25:34
2012	World Race Walking Cup	Saransk, Russia	11th	20 km	1:21:51
2012	Olympic Games	London, England	9th	20 km	1:20:18
2012	Olympic Games	London, England	3rd	50 km	3:37:54 (PB)
2013	European Race Walking Cup	Dudince, Slovakia	9th	20 km	1:23:26
2013	World Championships	Moscow, Russia	1st	50 km	3:37:56
2014	World Race Walking Cup	Taicang, China	23rd	20 km	1:21:00
2015	World Championships	Beijing, China	5th	50 km	3:44:17
2016	Olympic Games	Rio de Janeiro, Brazil	6th	50 km	3:43:55

== Personal life ==
Heffernan is married to Marian Heffernan, a 400m Olympian, and lives with his wife and family in Cork city. He has written an autobiography of his life called Walking Tall in 2016. His son, Cathal Heffernan, plays football for Newcastle United's U21 squad and has played for the Republic of Ireland U17 and U19 teams. His daughter, Meghan Carr, plays in the LOI Women's Premier Division for Waterford.
