= United States at the 2025 World Athletics Championships =

- Flag of the United States
- WA code: USA
- National federation: USA Track & Field
- Website: usatf.org

in Tokyo, Japan September 13-21, 2025
- Competitors: 141 (66 men and 75 women) in 47 events
- Medals Ranked 1st: Gold 16 Silver 5 Bronze 5 Total 26

World Athletics Championships appearances (overview)
- 1976; 1980; 1983; 1987; 1991; 1993; 1995; 1997; 1999; 2001; 2003; 2005; 2007; 2009; 2011; 2013; 2015; 2017; 2019; 2022; 2023; 2025

The United States competed at the 2025 World Athletics Championships in Tokyo, Japan, from 13 to 21 September 2025. The selection meet for these championships was the 2025 USA Outdoor Track and Field Championships. Team members were announced on September 2, 2025.

== Medalists ==
| Medal | Athlete | Event | Date |
|---|---|---|---|
| Gold | Ryan Crouser | Men's shot put | 13 September |
| Gold | Bryce Deadmon; Lynna Irby-Jackson; Jenoah McKiver; Alexis Holmes | Mixed 4 × 400 metres relay | 13 September |
| Gold | Valarie Allman | Women's discus throw | 14 September |
| Gold | Tara Davis-Woodhall | Women's long jump | 14 September |
| Gold | Melissa Jefferson-Wooden | Women's 100 metres | 14 September |
| Gold | Cordell Tinch | Men's 110 metres hurdles | 16 September |
| Gold | Katie Moon | Women's pole vault | 17 September |
| Gold | Sydney McLaughlin-Levrone | Women's 400 metres | 18 September |
| Gold | Rai Benjamin | Men's 400 metres hurdles | 19 September |
| Gold | Noah Lyles | Men's 200 metres | 19 September |
| Gold | Melissa Jefferson-Wooden | Women's 200 metres | 19 September |
| Gold | Anna Hall | Women's heptathlon | 20 September |
| Gold | Cole Hocker | Men's 5000 metres | 21 September |
| Gold | Isabella Whittaker; Lynna Irby-Jackson; Aaliyah Butler; Sydney McLaughlin-Levrone; Alexis Holmes*; Rosey Effiong*; Quanera Hayes*; Britton Wilson* | Women's 4 × 400 metres relay | 21 September |
| Gold | Melissa Jefferson-Wooden; Twanisha Terry; Kayla White; Sha'Carri Richardson; Jacious Sears* | Women's 4 × 100 metres relay | 21 September |
| Gold | Christian Coleman; Kenny Bednarek; Courtney Lindsey; Noah Lyles; Ronnie Baker*; Trayvon Bromell*; T'Mars McCallum* | Men's 4 × 100 metres relay | 21 September |
| Silver | Sandi Morris | Women's pole vault | 17 September |
| Silver | Jasmine Jones | Women's 400 metres hurdles | 19 September |
| Silver | Kenny Bednarek | Men's 200 metres | 19 September |
| Silver | Chase Jackson | Women's shot put | 20 September |
| Silver | Vernon Norwood; Jacory Patterson; Khaleb McRae; Rai Benjamin; Chris Bailey*; Demarius Smith*; Bryce Deadmon*; Jenoah McKiver* | Men's 4 × 400 metres relay | 21 September |
| Bronze | Noah Lyles | Men's 100 metres | 14 September |
| Bronze | Grace Stark | Women's 100 metres hurdles | 15 September |
| Bronze | Curtis Thompson | Men's javelin throw | 18 September |
| Bronze | Taliyah Brooks | Women's heptathlon | 20 September |
| Bronze | Kyle Garland | Men's decathlon | 21 September |

== Results ==
Key

- Q = Qualified for the next round
- q = Qualified for the next round as a fastest loser or, in field events, by position without achieving the qualifying target
- NR = National record
- PB = Personal best
- SB = Season best
- N/A = Round not applicable for the event

=== Men ===
Track and road events

| Athlete | Event | Heat | | Semifinal | | Final | |
| Athlete | Event | Result | Rank | Result | Rank | Result | Rank |
|---|---|---|---|---|---|---|---|
| Kenny Bednarek | 100 metres | 10.01 (-0.8) | 7 Q | 9.85 (+0.2) | 1 Q | 9.92 (+0.3) | 4 |
| Courtney Lindsey | 100 metres | 10.19 (-1.2) | 22 Q | 10.18 (+0.0) | 21 | Did not advance | |
| Noah Lyles | 100 metres | 9.95 (-1.1) | 4 Q | 9.92 (+0.1) | 4 Q | 9.89 (+0.3) SB | 3rd place, bronze medalist(s) |
| T'Mars McCallum | 100 metres | 10.25 (-0.6) | 35 | Did not advance | | | |
| Kenny Bednarek | 200 metres | 19.98 (-0.3) | 4 Q | 19.88 (-0.1) | 3 Q | 19.58 (+0.0) SB | 2nd place, silver medalist(s) |
| Robert Gregory | 200 metres | 20.43 (-0.2) | 26 | Did not advance | | | |
| Courtney Lindsey | 200 metres | 19.95 (-0.5) | 3 Q | 20.30 (+0.0) | 16 | Did not advance | |
| Noah Lyles | 200 metres | 19.99 (+0.1) | 5 Q | 19.51 (+1.0) WL | 1 Q | 19.52 (+0.0) | 1st place, gold medalist(s) |
| Chris Bailey | 400 metres | 44.49 | 10 Q | 45.05 | 22 | Did not advance | |
| Khaleb McRae | 400 metres | 44.25 | 2 Q | 44.82 | 13 | Did not advance | |
| Vernon Norwood | 400 metres | 44.55 | 13 Q | 44.83 | 15 | Did not advance | |
| Jacory Patterson | 400 metres | 43.90 | 1 Q | 44.19 | 4 q | 44.70 | 7 |
| Donavan Brazier | 800 metres | 1:44.66 | 1 Q | 1:43.82 | 7 | Did not advance | |
| Bryce Hoppel | 800 metres | 1:45.09 | 15 Q | 1:43.92 | 9 | Did not advance | |
| Cooper Lutkenhaus | 800 metres | 1:47.68 | 54 | Did not advance | | | |
| Cole Hocker | 1500 metres | 3:41.88 | 34 Q | DQ | | Did not advance | |
| Jonah Koech | 1500 metres | 3:37.11 | 10 Q | 3:36.89 | 16 Q | 3:37.00 | 13 |
| Ethan Strand | 1500 metres | 3:36.27 | 3 Q | 3:36.15 | 8 | Did not advance | |
| Grant Fisher | 5000 metres | 13:41.83 | 24 Q | —N/a | | 13:00.79 | 8 |
| Cole Hocker | 5000 metres | 13:13.41 | 3 Q | —N/a | | 12:58.30 | 1st place, gold medalist(s) |
| Nico Young | 5000 metres | 13:13.51 | 4 Q | —N/a | | 13:00.07 | 6 |
| Graham Blanks | 10,000 metres | —N/a | | | | 29:01.27 | 11 |
| Grant Fisher | 10,000 metres | —N/a | | | | 28:57.85 SB | 8 |
| Nico Young | 10,000 metres | —N/a | | | | 28:56.62 SB | 5 |
| CJ Albertson | Marathon | —N/a | | | | 2:19:25 | 40 |
| Reed Fischer | Marathon | —N/a | | | | 2:15:17 SB | 28 |
| Clayton Young | Marathon | —N/a | | | | 2:10:43 SB | 9 |
| Dylan Beard | 110 metres hurdles | 13.28 (-0.6) | 13 Q | 13.31 (-0.8) | 13 | Did not advance | |
| Grant Holloway | 110 metres hurdles | 13.27 (-0.3) | =8 Q | 13.52 (-0.1) | 17 | Did not advance | |
| Ja'Kobe Tharp | 110 metres hurdles | 13.28 (-0.2) | 12 Q | 13.19 (-0.1) | 5 q | 13.31 (-0.3) | 6 |
| Cordell Tinch | 110 metres hurdles | 13.31 (+0.0) | 15 Q | 13.16 (-0.5) | 2 Q | 12.99 (-0.3) | 1st place, gold medalist(s) |
| Rai Benjamin | 400 metres hurdles | 48.15 | 2 Q | 47.95 | 7 Q | 46.52 SB | 1st place, gold medalist(s) |
| Caleb Dean | 400 metres hurdles | 48.67 | 16 Q | 47.85 | 6 q | 48.20 | 7 |
| Chris Robinson | 400 metres hurdles | 48.27 | 5 Q | DNF | | Did not advance | |
| Daniel Michalski | 3000 metres steeplechase | 8:28.76 | 9 Q | —N/a | | 8:37.12 | 9 |
| Kenneth Rooks | 3000 metres steeplechase | 8:45.57 | 31 | —N/a | | Did not advance | |
| Isaac Updike | 3000 metres steeplechase | 8:33.46 | 24 | —N/a | | Did not advance | |
| Christian Coleman; Kenny Bednarek; Courtney Lindsey; Noah Lyles; Ronnie Baker*; Trayvon Bromell*; T'Mars McCallum* | 4 × 100 metres relay | 37.98 | 4 Q | —N/a | | 37.29 WL | 1st place, gold medalist(s) |
| Vernon Norwood; Jacory Patterson; Khaleb McRae; Rai Benjamin; Chris Bailey*; Demarius Smith*; Bryce Deadmon*; Jenoah McKiver* | 4 × 400 metres relay | 2:58.48 SB | 4 qR | —N/a | | 2:57.83 SB | 2nd place, silver medalist(s) |

Field events

| Athlete | Event | Qualification | | Final | |
| Athlete | Event | Distance | Position | Distance | Position |
|---|---|---|---|---|---|
| JuVaughn Harrison | High jump | 2.25 | =5 q | 2.28 =SB | 5 |
| Shelby McEwen | High jump | 2.21 | =19 | Did not advance | |
| Tyus Wilson | High jump | 2.25 | 11 q | 2.28 =SB | =6 |
| Sam Kendricks | Pole vault | 5.75 | =1 q | 5.95 SB | 4 |
| Matt Ludwig | Pole vault | 5.70 | 15 | Did not advance | |
| Austin Miller | Pole vault | 5.55 | =24 | Did not advance | |
| Jeremiah Davis | Long jump | 7.81 (+0.5) | 23 | Did not advance | |
| Isaac Grimes | Long jump | 8.04 (+0.7) | 10 q | 7.85 (-0.1) | 10 |
| Will Williams | Long jump | 7.63 (+0.4) | 29 | Did not advance | |
| Will Claye | Triple jump | 16.52 (+0.6) | 19 | Did not advance | |
| Salif Mane | Triple jump | 16.86 (+0.1) | 10 q | 16.29 (-0.4) | 12 |
| Russell Robinson | Triple jump | NM | | Did not advance | |
| Josh Awotunde | Shot put | 20.78 | 8 q | 21.14 | 7 |
| Ryan Crouser | Shot put | 21.37 SB | 3 Q | 22.34 SB | 1st place, gold medalist(s) |
| Payton Otterdahl | Shot put | 19.78 | 22 | Did not advance | |
| Tripp Piperi | Shot put | 21.47 | 2 Q | 21.50 | 6 |
| Marcus Gustaveson | Discus | 59.12 | 31 | Did not advance | |
| Reggie Jagers | Discus | 63.59 | 14 | Did not advance | |
| Sam Mattis | Discus | 62.86 | 20 | Did not advance | |
| Marc Anthony Minichello | Javelin throw | 80.47 | 20 | Did not advance | |
| Curtis Thompson | Javelin throw | 84.72 | 7 Q | 86.67 | 3rd place, bronze medalist(s) |
| Daniel Haugh | Hammer throw | 74.87 | 17 | Did not advance | |
| Trey Knight | Hammer throw | 76.40 | 10 q | 76.11 | 10 |
| Rudy Winkler | Hammer throw | 77.46 | 6 Q | 78.52 | 5 |

Combined events – Decathlon

| Athlete | Event | 100 m | LJ | SP | HJ | 400 m | 110H | DT | PV | JT | 1500 m | Final | Rank |
|---|---|---|---|---|---|---|---|---|---|---|---|---|---|
| Heath Baldwin | Result | 11.01 (+0.1) | 7.26 (+0.4) | 15.33 | 2.08 | 48.44 | 14.16 (+1.1) | 41.01 | 4.80 | 65.24 | 4:33.42 PB | 8337 | 6 |
| Heath Baldwin | Points | 858 | 876 | 810 | 878 | 888 | 954 | 685 | 849 | 817 | 722 | 8337 | 6 |
| Kyle Garland | Result | 10.51 (+0.2) | 7.92 (+0.4) SB | 17.02 PB | 2.11 | 48.73 SB | 14.30 (+1.1) | 48.06 | 4.80 | 59.78 | 4:45.45 SB | 8703 | 3rd place, bronze medalist(s) |
| Kyle Garland | Points | 973 | 1040 | 914 | 906 | 874 | 936 | 830 | 849 | 735 | 646 | 8703 | 3rd place, bronze medalist(s) |
| Harrison Williams | Result | 10.79 (+0.2) | 6.88 (+0.4) | 14.87 | 1.90 | 46.88 | 14.56 (-0.2) SB | 45.61 | 5.20 SB | 55.44 SB | 4:22.72 SB | 8269 SB | 7 |
| Harrison Williams | Points | 908 | 785 | 782 | 714 | 964 | 903 | 779 | 972 | 669 | 793 | 8269 SB | 7 |

=== Women ===
Track and road events

| Athlete | Event | Heat | | Semifinal | | Final | |
| Athlete | Event | Result | Rank | Result | Rank | Result | Rank |
|---|---|---|---|---|---|---|---|
| Melissa Jefferson-Wooden | 100 metres | 10.99 (-0.9) | 3 Q | 10.73 (+0.2) | 1 Q | 10.61 (+0.3) CR | 1st place, gold medalist(s) |
| Sha'Carri Richardson | 100 metres | 11.03 (-0.8) SB | 5 Q | 11.00 (-0.3) SB | 7 q | 10.94 (+0.3) SB | 5 |
| Twanisha Terry | 100 metres | 11.06 (+0.5) | 8 Q | 11.07 (+0.1) | 11 | Did not advance | |
| Kayla White | 100 metres | 11.16 (-0.1) | 17 Q | 11.20 (-0.3) | 17 | Did not advance | |
| Anavia Battle | 200 metres | 22.07 (+0.1) SB | 1 Q | 22.09 (-0.3) | 4 Q | 22.22 (-0.1) | 4 |
| Brittany Brown | 200 metres | 22.50 (+0.1) | 6 Q | 22.13 (-0.1) SB | 5 q | 22.54 (-0.1) | 6 |
| Melissa Jefferson-Wooden | 200 metres | 22.24 (-0.3) | 2 Q | 22.00 (+0.1) | 2 Q | 21.68 (-0.1) WL | 1st place, gold medalist(s) |
| McKenzie Long | 200 metres | 22.51 (-0.2) | 7 Q | 22.48 (-0.3) | =8 q | 22.78 (-0.1) | 8 |
| Aaliyah Butler | 400 metres | 50.44 | 13 Q | 50.63 | 14 | Did not advance | |
| Sydney McLaughlin-Levrone | 400 metres | 49.41 | 2 Q | 48.29 NR WL | 1 Q | 47.78 CR AR WL | 1st place, gold medalist(s) |
| Isabella Whittaker | 400 metres | 50.82 | 19 Q | 50.20 | 10 | Did not advance | |
| Maggi Congdon | 800 metres | 2:01.74 | 40 Q | 1:59.95 | 23 | Did not advance | |
| Sage Hurta-Klecker | 800 metres | 1:58.43 | 4 Q | 1:57.62 | 6 q | 1:55.89 PB | 5 |
| Roisin Willis | 800 metres | 2:00.24 | 23 | Did not advance | | | |
| Nikki Hiltz | 1500 metres | 4:01.73 | 2 Q | 4:07.04 | 12 Q | 3:57.08 | 5 |
| Sinclaire Johnson | 1500 metres | 4:04.59 | 17 Q | 4:01.08 | 4 Q | 4:00.92 | 13 |
| Emily Mackay | 1500 metres | 4:08.19 | 34 Q | 4:12.80 | 20 | Did not advance | |
| Josette Andrews | 5000 metres | 14:57.59 | 15 Q | —N/a | | 15:00.25 | 6 |
| Elise Cranny | 5000 metres | 15:00.23 SB | 18 | —N/a | | Did not advance | |
| Shelby Houlihan | 5000 metres | 14:46.52 | 3 Q | —N/a | | 14:57.42 | 4 |
| Elise Cranny | 10,000 metres | —N/a | | | | 31:40.07 | 12 |
| Emily Infeld | 10,000 metres | —N/a | | | | 31:47.65 | 14 |
| Taylor Roe | 10,000 metres | —N/a | | | | 32:12.19 | 18 |
| Erika Kemp | Marathon | —N/a | | | | 2:50:35 | 52 |
| Jessica McClain | Marathon | —N/a | | | | 2:29:20 SB | 8 |
| Susanna Sullivan | Marathon | —N/a | | | | 2:28:17 SB | 4 |
| Alaysha Johnson | 100 metres hurdles | 12.76 (+0.0) | 12 Q | 12.66 (-0.2) | 10 | Did not advance | |
| Masai Russell | 100 metres hurdles | 12.53 (+0.2) | 6 Q | 12.42 (+0.2) | 3 Q | 12.44 (-0.1) | 4 |
| Grace Stark | 100 metres hurdles | 12.46 (+0.1) | 2 Q | 12.37 (-0.5) | 2 Q | 12.34 (-0.1) | 3rd place, bronze medalist(s) |
| Anna Cockrell | 400 metres hurdles | 53.63 | 2 Q | 53.28 | 6 Q | 53.13 | 4 |
| Jasmine Jones | 400 metres hurdles | 53.18 =SB | 1 Q | 53.01 SB | 3 Q | 52.08 PB | 2nd place, silver medalist(s) |
| Dalilah Muhammad | 400 metres hurdles | 53.80 | 5 Q | 53.14 | 4 Q | 54.82 | 7 |
| Lexy Halladay-Lowry | 3000 metres steeplechase | 9:15.06 | 9 Q | —N/a | | 9:34.03 | 14 |
| Kaylee Mitchell | 3000 metres steeplechase | 9:15.52 | 11 Q | —N/a | | 9:18.66 | 10 |
| Angelina Napoleon | 3000 metres steeplechase | 9:18.03 | 16 Q | —N/a | | 9:17.44 | 9 |
| Melissa Jefferson-Wooden; Twanisha Terry; Kayla White; Sha'Carri Richardson; Jacious Sears* | 4 × 100 metres relay | 41.60 WL | 1 Q | —N/a | | 41.75 | 1st place, gold medalist(s) |
| Isabella Whittaker; Lynna Irby-Jackson; Aaliyah Butler; Sydney McLaughlin-Levrone; Alexis Holmes*; Rosey Effiong*; Quanera Hayes*; Britton Wilson* | 4 × 400 metres relay | 3:22.53 WL | 1 Q | —N/a | | 3:16.61 CR | 1st place, gold medalist(s) |
| Lauren Harris | 20 kilometres walk | —N/a | | | | 1:32:50 PB | 27 |
| Katie Burnett | 35 kilometres walk | —N/a | | | | 3:14:13 | 32 |
| Miranda Melville | 35 kilometres walk | —N/a | | | | 3:12:07 | 30 |
| Maria Michta-Coffey | 35 kilometres walk | —N/a | | | | 3:05:02 SB | 22 |

Field events

| Athlete | Event | Qualification | | Final | |
| Athlete | Event | Distance | Position | Distance | Position |
|---|---|---|---|---|---|
| Sanaa Barnes | High jump | 1.83 | =25 | Did not advance | |
| Vashti Cunningham | High jump | 1.88 | =17 | Did not advance | |
| Emma Gates | High jump | 1.88 | =22 | Did not advance | |
| Amanda Moll | Pole vault | 4.60 | =1 q | 4.65 | 6 |
| Hana Moll | Pole vault | 4.60 | 13 q | 4.65 | 6 |
| Katie Moon | Pole vault | 4.60 | =7 q | 4.90 SB | 1st place, gold medalist(s) |
| Sandi Morris | Pole vault | 4.60 | =1 q | 4.85 SB | 2nd place, silver medalist(s) |
| Claire Bryant | Long jump | 6.72 (+0.4) | 5 q | 6.68 (+0.0) | 5 |
| Quanesha Burks | Long jump | 6.63 (-0.4) | 8 q | 6.60 (-0.5) | 8 |
| Tara Davis-Woodhall | Long jump | 6.88 (+0.8) | 1 Q | 7.13 (-0.2) WL | 1st place, gold medalist(s) |
| Agur Dwol | Triple jump | 13.30 (+1.2) | 34 | Did not advance | |
| Jasmine Moore | Triple jump | 14.22 (+0.6) | 6 q | 14.51 (+1.2) | 7 |
| Maggie Ewen | Shot put | 17.31 | 26 | Did not advance | |
| Chase Jackson | Shot put | 19.31 | 2 Q | 20.21 | 2nd place, silver medalist(s) |
| Jessica Ramsey | Shot put | 18.28 | 14 | Did not advance | |
| Jaida Ross | Shot put | 19.13 | 6 q | 19.01 | 8 |
| Valarie Allman | Discus throw | 66.07 | 3 Q | 69.48 | 1st place, gold medalist(s) |
| Shelby Frank | Discus throw | 58.90 | 23 | Did not advance | |
| Gabi Jacobs | Discus throw | 59.70 | 18 | Did not advance | |
| Laulauga Tausaga | Discus throw | 64.99 | 5 Q | 65.49 | 6 |
| Evie Bliss | Javelin | 58.88 | 19 | Did not advance | |
| Madison Wiltrout | Javelin | 59.58 | 18 | Did not advance | |
| Brooke Andersen | Hammer throw | NM | | Did not advance | |
| Janee' Kassanavoid | Hammer throw | 71.95 | 9 q | 70.35 | 10 |
| DeAnna Price | Hammer throw | 74.99 | 3 Q | 75.10 | 5 |
| Rachel Richeson | Hammer throw | 66.95 | 28 | Did not advance | |

Combined events – Heptathlon

| Athlete | Event | 100H | HJ | SP | 200 m | LJ | JT | 800 m | Final | Rank |
|---|---|---|---|---|---|---|---|---|---|---|
| Michelle Atherley | Result | 13.22 (-0.7) | 1.68 | 13.92 | 23.86 (+0.4) | 6.20 (+0.2) SB | 40.32 | 2:07.77 | 6287 | 11 |
| Michelle Atherley | Points | 1091 | 830 | 789 | 994 | 912 | 673 | 998 | 6287 | 11 |
| Taliyah Brooks | Result | 12.93 (-0.7) | 1.77 | 13.92 | 24.18 (+0.4) | 6.79 (-0.1) PB | 43.37 PB | 2:13.17 PB | 6581 PB | = (bronze) |
| Taliyah Brooks | Points | 1135 | 941 | 789 | 963 | 1102 | 732 | 919 | 6581 PB | = (bronze) |
| Timara Chapman | Result | 13.74 (-0.2) | 1.71 | 12.32 | 25.10 (-0.3) | 5.37 (-0.1) | 40.92 | DNS | DNF | |
| Timara Chapman | Points | 1015 | 867 | 682 | 878 | 663 | 685 | —N/a | DNF | |
| Anna Hall | Result | 13.05 (-0.7) SB | 1.89 | 15.80 PB | 23.50 (+0.4) | 6.12 (+0.2) | 48.13 PB | 2:06.08 | 6888 | 1st place, gold medalist(s) |
| Anna Hall | Points | 1117 | 1093 | 915 | 1029 | 887 | 824 | 1023 | 6888 | 1st place, gold medalist(s) |

=== Mixed ===
| Athlete | Event | Heat | | Final | |
| Athlete | Event | Result | Rank | Result | Rank |
|---|---|---|---|---|---|
| Bryce Deadmon; Lynna Irby-Jackson; Jenoah McKiver; Alexis Holmes | 4 × 400 metres relay | 3:10.18 | 1 Q | 3:08.80 =CR | 1st place, gold medalist(s) |
