= Women's pentathlon =

Combined track and field competition for women

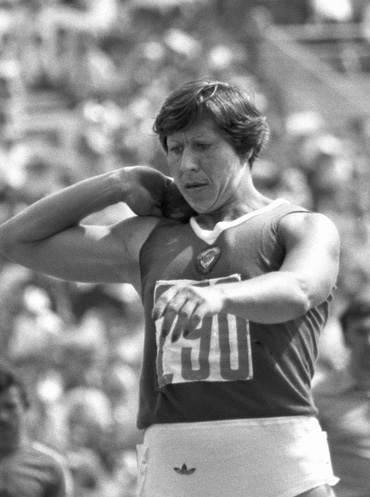
Nadiya Tkachenko competing in the shot put event at the 1980 Olympic pentathlon, where she won the gold medal

The pentathlon or women's pentathlon is a combined track and field event in which each woman competes in five separate events over one day (formerly two days). The distance or time for each event is converted to points via scoring tables, with the overall ranking determined by total points. Since 1949 the events have been sprint hurdling, high jump, shot put, long jump, and a flat race. The sprint hurdles distance was 80 m outdoors until 1969 and thereafter 100 m; in indoor pentathlon the distance is 60 m. The flat race was 200 m until 1976 and thereafter 800 m. In elite-level outdoor competition, the pentathlon was superseded in 1981 by the heptathlon, which has seven events, with both 200 m and 800 m, as well as the javelin throw. Pentathlon is still contested at school and masters level and indoors.

== History ==
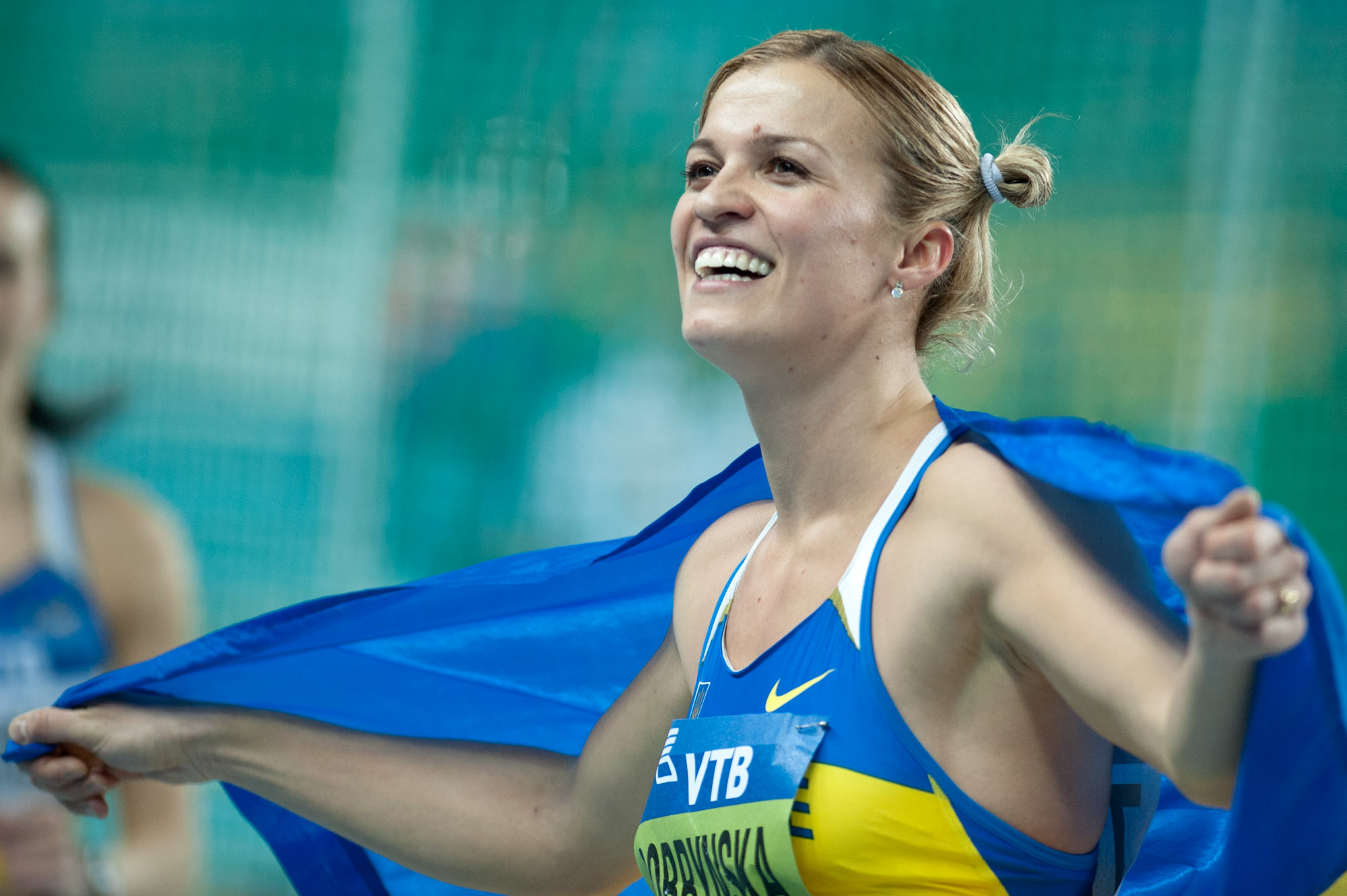
Nataliya Dobrynska celebrating her pentathlon win at the 2012 IAAF World Indoor Championships

The word pentathlon is derived from the Greek pente (five) and athlon (contest). The ancient Olympic pentathlon comprised a sprint, the javelin and discus throws, long jump, and wrestling. The modern pentathlon is a multi-sport event. In men's track and field, pentathlon competitions were held in the 20th century, but the ten-event decathlon became the standard multi-event contest.

The International Women's Sports Federation was established in 1921 and the first reported pentathlon was in the 1922 Women's Olympiad in Monte Carlo. The events were: 60 m, 300 m, high jump, two-hand javelin, and two-hand shot. In the late 1920s, the events were: shot and long jump on the first day, and 100 m, high jump, and javelin on the second day. The first world record recognised by the IAAF was set at the 1934 Women's World Games by Gisela Mauermayer.

From 1949 the events were: shot, high jump, and 200 m on the first day; 80 m hurdles and long jump on the second. The scoring tables were changed in 1954, and again in 1971. In 1961, the order of the events was changed to: 80 m hurdles, shot, and high jump on the first day; long jump and 200 m on the second, in 1971 the 80 m hurdles were changed to 100 m hurdles. From 1977 all were contested in a single day. Pentathlon was contested at the European Athletics Championships from 1950 to 1978, and at the Olympics from 1964 until 1980. The IAAF has not ratified world records in outdoor pentathlon since replacing it in 1981 with the heptathlon.

== Indoors ==
The pentathlon is still held indoors, where the heptathlon cannot be held as arenas are too small for the javelin throw. It was added to the IAAF World Indoor Championships as an unofficial event in 1993 and officially in 1995. The indoor pentathlon is held over a one-day period. Each athlete completes one event at the same time, then there is a 30-minute break until the next event. The current world record is 5055 points by Nafissatou Thiam at the 2023 European Athletics Indoor Championships.

Events
60 metres hurdles
High jump
Shot put
Long jump
800 metres

=== Area records ===
- Updated 20 May 2026.

Area	Score	Season	Athlete
World	5055	2023	Nafissatou Thiam (BEL)
Area records
Africa (records)	4558	1997	Eunice Barber (SLE)
Asia (records)	4582	2006	Olga Rypakova (KAZ)
Europe (records)	5055	2023	Nafissatou Thiam (BEL)
North, Central America and Caribbean (records)	5004	2023	Anna Hall (USA)
Oceania (records)	4490	1999	Jane Jamieson (AUS)
South America (records)	4292	2016	Vanessa Chefer Spínola (BRA)

=== All-time top 25 ===
(60 m hurdles, high jump, shot put, long jump, 800m)

- Correct as of 22 March 2026.

Rank	Score	Athlete	Date	Place	Ref.
1	5055	Nafissatou Thiam (BEL)	3 March 2023	Istanbul	
2	5014	Adrianna Sułek (POL)	3 March 2023	Istanbul	
3	5013	Nataliya Dobrynska (UKR)	9 March 2012	Istanbul	
4	5004 A	Anna Hall (USA)	16 February 2023	Albuquerque	
5	5000	Katarina Johnson-Thompson (GBR)	6 March 2015	Prague	
6	4991	Irina Belova (RUS)	15 February 1992	Berlin	
7	4965	Jessica Ennis (GBR)	9 March 2012	Istanbul	
8	4948	Carolina Klüft (SWE)	4 March 2005	Madrid	
9	4929	Noor Vidts (BEL)	18 March 2022	Belgrade	
10	4927	Kelly Sotherton (GBR)	2 March 2007	Birmingham	
11	4922	Saga Vanninen (FIN)	9 March 2025	Apeldoorn	
12	4896	Ekaterina Bolshova (RUS)	7 February 2012	Moscow	
13	4888	Sofie Dokter (NED)	22 March 2026	Toruń	
14	4881	Brianne Theisen-Eaton (CAN)	18 March 2016	Portland	
15	4877	Tia Hellebaut (BEL)	11 February 2007	Ghent	
16	4866	Svetlana Moskalets (RUS)	3 February 1995	Chelyabinsk	
17	4850	Natallia Sazanovich (BLR)	9 March 2001	Lisbon	
18	4839	Kate O'Connor (IRL)	22 March 2026	Toruń	
19	4830	Nadine Broersen (NED)	7 March 2014	Sopot	
20	4808	Urszula Włodarczyk (POL)	27 February 1998	Valencia	
21	4805 A	Sharon Day-Monroe (USA)	21 February 2014	Albuquerque	
22	4802	Austra Skujytė (LTU)	9 March 2012	Istanbul	
23	4801	Larisa Turchinskaya (RUS)	11 March 1994	Paris	
23	4801	Karin Ruckstuhl (NED)	2 March 1997	Birmingham	
25	4792	Olga Kurban (RUS)	7 February 2012	Moscow	

==== Notes ====
Below is a list of scores equal or superior to 4792 pts:

- Katarina Johnson-Thompson also scored 4983 (2019).
- Carolina Klüft also scored 4944 (2007), 4933 (2003).
- Jessica Ennis-Hill also scored 4937 (2010).
- Nafissatou Thiam also scored 4904 (2021), 4870 (2017).
- Natallia Dobrynska also scored 4880 (2012).
- Tia Hellebaut also scored 4867 (2008).
- Adrianna Sułek also scored 4860 (2023), 4851 (2022).
- Anna Hall also scored 4860 (2026), 4831 (2026).
- Saga Vanninen also scored 4843 (2025), 4821 (2025).
- Sofie Dokter also scored 4826 (2025).
- Noor Vidts also scored 4823 (2023).

==== Annulled marks ====
- Tatyana Chernova of Russia's score of 4855 pts was annulled due to doping.
- Anastasiya Mokhnyuk of Ukraine's score of 4847 pts was annulled due to doping.

=== World record progression ===
Athlete	Country	Points	Event results	Place	Date
Sabine John	East Germany	4768	8.16 s, 1.74 m, 14.76 m, 6.61 m, 2:15.63	Moscow, Soviet Union	15 February 1985
Irina Belova	Russia	4991	8.22 s, 1.93 m, 13.25 m, 6.67 m, 2:10.26	Berlin, Germany	15 February 1992
Nataliya Dobrynska	Ukraine	5013	8.38 s, 1.84 m, 16.51 m, 6.57 m, 2:11.15	Istanbul, Turkey	9 March 2012
Adrianna Sułek	Poland	5014	8.21 s, 1.89 m, 13.89 m, 6.62 m, 2:07.17	Istanbul, Turkey	3 March 2023
Nafissatou Thiam	Belgium	5055	8.23 s, 1.92 m, 15.54 m, 6.59 m, 2:13.60	Istanbul, Turkey	3 March 2023

=== World records (WR) compared to Pentathlon Bests (PB) ===
Event	Type	Athlete	Record	Score	Difference in points scored	Ref.
60 m hurdles
60 m hurdles	WR	Devynne Charlton	7.65 s	1212		
60 m hurdles	PB	Jessica Ennis	7.91 s	1150	−62	
High jump
High jump	WR	Kajsa Bergqvist	2.08 m	1345		
High jump	PB	Tia Hellebaut	1.99 m	1224	−121	
Shot put
Shot put	WR	Helena Fibingerová	22.50 m	1369		
Shot put	PB	Eva Wilms	20.27 m	1217	−152	
Long jump
Long jump	WR	Heike Drechsler	7.37 m	1299		
Long jump	PB	Katarina Johnson-Thompson	6.89 m	1135	−164	
800 m
800 m	WR	Keely Hodgkinson	1:54.87 min:s	1198		
800 m	PB	Ester Goossens	2:04.42 min:s	1048	−150	
Total	World record			6423		
Total	Pentathlon bests			5774	−649	

=== Olympic medalists ===
Games	Gold	Silver	Bronze
1964 Tokyo	Irina Press; Soviet Union	Mary Rand; Great Britain	Galina Bystrova; Soviet Union
1968 Mexico City	Ingrid Becker; West Germany	Liese Prokop; Austria	Annamária Tóth; Hungary
1972 Munich	Mary Peters; Great Britain	Heide Rosendahl; West Germany	Burglinde Pollak; East Germany
1976 Montreal	Siegrun Siegl; East Germany	Christine Laser; East Germany	Burglinde Pollak; East Germany
1980 Moscow	Nadiya Tkachenko; Soviet Union	Olga Rukavishnikova; Soviet Union	Olga Kuragina; Soviet Union

=== World Indoor Championships medalists ===
Games	Gold	Silver	Bronze
1995 Barcelona	Svetlana Moskalets (RUS)	Kym Carter (USA)	Irina Tyukhay (RUS)
1997 Paris	Sabine Braun (GER)	Mona Steigauf (GER)	Kym Carter (USA)
1999 Maebashi	LeShundra Nathan (USA)	Irina Belova (RUS)	Urszula Włodarczyk (POL)
2001 Lisbon	Natallia Sazanovich (BLR)	Yelena Prokhorova (RUS)	Karin Ertl (GER)
2003 Birmingham	Carolina Klüft (SWE)	Natallia Sazanovich (BLR)	Marie Collonvillé (FRA)
2004 Budapest	Naide Gomes (POR)	Nataliya Dobrynska (UKR)	Austra Skujytė (LTU)
2006 Moscow	Lyudmyla Blonska (UKR)	Karin Ruckstuhl (NED)	Olga Levenkova (UKR)
2008 Valencia	Tia Hellebaut (BEL)	Kelly Sotherton (GBR)	Anna Bogdanova (RUS)
2010 Doha	Jessica Ennis (GBR)	Nataliya Dobrynska (UKR)	Hyleas Fountain (USA)
2012 Istanbul	Nataliya Dobrynska (UKR)	Jessica Ennis (GBR)	Austra Skujytė (LTU)
2014 Sopot	Nadine Broersen (NED)	Brianne Theisen-Eaton (CAN)	Alina Fyodorova (UKR)
2016 Portland	Brianne Theisen-Eaton (CAN)	Alina Fyodorova (UKR)	Barbara Nwaba (USA)
2018 Birmingham	Katarina Johnson-Thompson (GBR)	Ivona Dadic (AUT)	Yorgelis Rodríguez (CUB)
2022 Belgrade	Noor Vidts (BEL)	Adrianna Sułek (POL)	Kendell Williams (USA)
2024 Glasgow	Noor Vidts (BEL)	Saga Vanninen (FIN)	Sofie Dokter (NED)
2025 Nanjing	Saga Vanninen (FIN)	Kate O'Connor (IRL)	Taliyah Brooks (USA)
2026 Toruń	Sofie Dokter (NED)	Anna Hall (USA)	Kate O'Connor (IRL)

== World leading scores ==
Year	Score	Athlete	Place
2013	4,851	Ekaterina Bolshova (RUS)	Volgograd
2014	4,830	Nadine Broersen (NED)	Sopot
2015	5,000	Katarina Johnson-Thompson (GBR)	Prague
2016	4,881	Brianne Theisen-Eaton (CAN)	Portland
2017	4,870	Nafissatou Thiam (BEL)	Belgrade
2018	4,760 A	Erica Bougard (USA)	Albuquerque
2019	4,983	Katarina Johnson-Thompson (GBR)	Glasgow
2020	4,629	Noor Vidts (BEL)	Louvain-la-Neuve
2021	4,904	Nafissatou Thiam (BEL)	Toruń
2022	4,929	Noor Vidts (BEL)	Belgrade
2023	5,055	Nafissatou Thiam (BEL)	Istanbul
2024	4,773	Noor Vidts (BEL)	Glasgow
2025	4,922	Saga Vanninen (FIN)	Apeldoorn
2026	4,888	Sofie Dokter (NED)	Toruń

== Contemporary outdoor pentathlon ==
As well as indoor events at all levels, outdoor pentathlon is still common in high school athletics. It is simply a smaller version of the decathlon or a heptathlon. For girls, it is 100 m high hurdles, long jump, shot put, high jump, and an 800 m run. The pentathlon is used because it is less stressful on the athletes than a full multi and because many high school meets only last one day, it allows the event to be contested in the time limit.
