= Jadin O'Brien =

American multi-event athlete (born 2002)

Personal information
- Nationality: American
- Born: May 8, 2002 (age 24) Massachusetts, U.S.

Sport
- Sport: Athletics
- Event(s): Heptathlon, Pentathlon

Achievements and titles
- Personal best(s): Heptathlon: 6234 (Eugene, 2024); Pentathlon: 4596 (Virginia Beach, 2025)
Medal record
Women's athletics
Representing United States
NACAC U23 Championships
| Gold medal – first place | 2023 San Jose | Heptathlon |

Jadin O'Brien (born May 8, 2002) is an American multi-event athlete and bobsledder. She has won multiple NCAA titles in the pentathlon and won the gold medal at the 2023 NACAC U23 Championships in the heptathlon. She competed for the United States at the 2026 Winter Olympics.

== Early life ==
From Pewaukee, Wisconsin, her father is former NFL player Kevin O'Brien and her mother Leslie was a track athlete. She played numerous sports as a youngster before focusing on athletics in her freshman year at Divine Savior Holy Angels High School. She began attending University of Notre Dame in 2020.

== Career ==
=== Track and field ===
She finished twelfth in the US Olympic Trials in the heptathlon in 2021. In 2023, she won the 2023 NCAA Championship pentathlon title. She won the heptathlon at the 2023 NACAC U23 Championships.

She suffered a stress fracture in her shin which limited her 2023 outdoor track season however, but retained her NCAA Indoor pentathlon title in 2024. In April 2024, she set a school record in the women's heptathlon, scoring 6115 points in California. She finished runner-up to Timara Chapman at the NCAA Outdoor Championships in Eugene, Oregon in June 2024, with a tally of 6234 points. She finished seventh in the heptathlon at the US Olympic Trials in June 2024.

She won the 2025 NCAA Championship indoor pentathlon title on March 14, 2025, in Virginia Beach, ahead of Sofia Yakushina. She did so with a personal-best 4596 points and became the first woman to win three consecutive titles since Kendell Williams.

In June 2025, she was runner-up to Pippi Lotta Enok in the heptathlon at the 2025 NCAA Outdoor Championships in Eugene, Oregon with 6256 points. She placed fifth overall in the heptathlon at the 2025 USA Outdoor Track and Field Championships, finishing on 5991 points.

=== Bobsleigh ===
In 2025, she was linked to a try-out for the USA Bobsleigh team. In January 2026, she was named as a member of the United States bobsleigh team for the 2026 Winter Olympics.
