= Sophia Yakushina =

Russian multi-event athlete (born 2006)

Personal information
- Born: 7 January 2006 (age 20) Krasnodar, Russia

Sport
- Sport: Athletics
- Events: Heptathlon, Pentathlon

Achievements and titles
- Personal bests: Heptathlon: 6260 (2025); Pentathlon: 4556 (2025)

Sophia Yakushina (born 7 January 2006) is a Russian-born multi-event athlete. Her points tally in the pentathlon whilst competing for Texas A&M University in the United States placed her in the top-ten worldwide in 2025.

== Biography ==
Born in Krasnodar, Russia, Yakushina won the women's heptathlon at the Russian Combined Events Cup in Sochi, with 5809 points, in May 2023. She placed second in the heptathlon at the 2024 Russian Athletics Championships in Yekaterinburg, with a tally of 5957 points.

Competing as a freshman in the United States for Texas A&M University, Yakashina was runner-up to Pippi Lotta Enok in the pentathlon at the 2025 SEC Championships. She finished ahead of Enok but behind Jadin O'Brien in finishing second in the pentathlon at the 2025 NCAA Indoor Championships, in Virginia Beach. She finished the year ranked 9th in the world for the short track pentathlon.

Competing outdoors, Yakashina set a new personal best of 6260 points for the heptathlon whilst competing in Texas in April 2025, to move to the top of the NCAA standings. The following month, she won the heptathlon title at the SEC Outdoor Championships in May. In June, she placed third behind O'Brien and Enok in the heptathlon at the 2025 NCAA Outdoor Championships in Eugene, Oregon. She finished the year ranked 23rd in the world for the heptathlon.

In 2026, it was reported that she was becoming a naturalised citizen of Turkey, via a talent acquisition program overseen by the Turkish Youth and Sports Ministry. Onder Ozbilen, the team coordinator for Turkey's Olympic athletics team, confirmed the decision in March 2026. The application was declined by World Athletics in April 2026, alongside ten others, deemed as "inconsistent with the core principles of the regulations".
