= 1995 World Championships in Athletics – Women's heptathlon =

These are the official results of the Women's Heptathlon competition at the 1995 World Championships in Gothenburg, Sweden. With a total of 30 participating athletes, including 10 non-finishers, this edition of the women's heptathlon is notable for having the highest fraction of athletes not finishing the competition in the World Championships history. The competition started on August 9, 1995, and ended on August 10, 1995. The winning margin was 76 points.

== Medalists ==
Gold	Ghada Shouaa; Syria (SYR)
Silver	Svetlana Moskalets; Russia (RUS)
Bronze	Rita Ináncsi; Hungary (HUN)

== Schedule ==
Wednesday, August 9, 1995
1. 100 m hurdles
2. High Jump
3. Shot Put
4. 200 m

Thursday, August 10, 1995
5. Long Jump
6. Javelin Throw
7. 800 m

== Records ==
Standing records prior to the 1995 World Athletics Championships
World Record	Jackie Joyner-Kersee (USA)	7291	September 24, 1988	Seoul, South Korea
Event Record	Jackie Joyner-Kersee (USA)	7128	September 1, 1987	Rome, Italy

== Results ==
The best result for each event has a yellow background.

Rank	Athlete	Points	100h	HJ	SP	200	LJ	JT	800
1st place, gold medalist(s)	Ghada Shouaa (SYR)	6651	14.11	1.86	15.16	24.21	6.30	54.92	2:14.33
2nd place, silver medalist(s)	Svetlana Moskalets (RUS)	6575	13.48	1.89	13.60	23.51	6.70	41.08	2:16.32
3rd place, bronze medalist(s)	Rita Ináncsi (HUN)	6522	13.61	1.83	14.73	24.38	6.53	46.66	2:16.56
4	Eunice Barber (SLE)	6340	13.60	1.80	11.43	24.66	6.50	52.44	2:16.54
5	Kym Carter (USA)	6329	13.88	1.80	15.45	24.03	6.13	38.54	2:10.48
6	Regla Maria Cárdenas (CUB)	6306	13.83	1.80	13.97	23.77	6.46	41.72	2:19.09
7	Denise Lewis (GBR)	6299	13.52	1.74	13.24	24.97	6.57	49.70	2:19.35
8	LeShundra Nathan (USA)	6258	13.89	1.80	13.83	24.30	6.27	46.22	2:19.54
9	Urszula Włodarczyk (POL)	6248	13.74	1.86	13.79	24.02	6.37	37.76	2:19.46
10	Kelly Blair-LaBounty (USA)	6229	13.74	1.74	11.91	24.22	6.41	50.26	2:17.84
11	Nathalie Teppe (FRA)	6213	14.03	1.77	13.89	25.76	6.04	56.04	2:17.79
12	Sharon Jaklofsky (NED)	6148	13.56	1.77	12.94	24.88	6.53	41.30	2:19.06
13	Tiia Hautala (FIN)	6135	13.98	1.80	12.78	24.75	6.02	47.20	2:15.14
14	Jane Jamieson (AUS)	6133	14.43	1.86	12.75	24.86	6.18	45.04	2:15.84
15	Irina Tyukhay (RUS)	6112	13.58	1.80	14.36	24.53	6.42	40.42	2:30.13
16	Tina Rättyä (FIN)	6095	14.05	1.71	13.51	24.98	6.10	47.52	2:13.41
17	Remigija Nazarovienė (LTU)	6026	13.98	1.74	13.42	24.81	6.04	45.38	2:18.08
18	Yelena Lebedenko (RUS)	5920	13.93	1.68	13.24	24.72	6.42	40.00	2:21.90
19	Anzhela Atroshchenko (BLR)	5915	14.01	1.77	12.99	24.20	6.12	39.20	2:24.06
20	Karin Periginelli (ITA)	5613	14.49	1.71	11.46	24.93	5.56	41.16	2:13.74
	Peggy Beer (GER)	DNF	13.88	1.74	13.24	24.88	4.08	DNS	
	Catherine Bond-Mills (CAN)	DNF	13.92	1.80	13.16	24.94	NM	DNS	
	Manuela Marxer (LIE)	DNF	13.83	1.74	13.23	24.40	NM	DNS	
	Svetlana Kazanina (KAZ)	DNF	15.97	1.71	12.56	25.06	NM	DNS	
	Heike Daute-Drechsler (GER)	DNF	13.86	1.80	13.12	DNS			
	Dagmar Urbankova (CZE)	DNF	14.36	1.65	11.35	DNS			
	Sabine Braun (GER)	DNF	13.41	1.80	DNS				
	Magalys García (CUB)	DNF	13.52	1.68	NM	DNS			
	Chun-Ping Ma (TPE)	DNF	14.95	1.68	DNS				
	Joanne Henry (NZL)	DNF	14.73	1.62	DNS				

== See also ==
- 1995 Hypo-Meeting
