= 2025 World Athletics Indoor Championships – Women's pentathlon =

Women's pentathlon at the 2025 World Athletics Indoor Championships
- Venue: Nanjing's Cube at Nanjing Youth Olympic Sports Park
- Location: Nanjing, China
- Dates: 21 March
- Competitors: 14 from 12 nations
- Winning score: 4821 pts

Medalists
gold medal	Saga Vanninen	Finland
silver medal	Kate O'Connor	Ireland
bronze medal	Taliyah Brooks	United States

The women's pentathlon at the 2025 World Athletics Indoor Championships took place on the short track of the Nanjing's Cube at Nanjing Youth Olympic Sports Park in Nanjing, China, on 21 March 2025. This was the 17th time the event was contested at the World Athletics Indoor Championships. Athletes could qualify by achieving the entry standard or by their World Athletics Ranking in the event.

The 60 metres hurdles, high jump and shot put took place on 21 March during the morning session. The long jump and 800 metres took place on 21 March during the evening session.

== Background ==
The women's pentathlon was contested 16 times before 2025, at every edition of the World Athletics Indoor Championships since 1993.

Records before the 2025 World Athletics Indoor Championships
Record	Athlete (nation)	Score (pts)	Location	Date
World record	Nafissatou Thiam (BEL)	5055	Istanbul, Turkey	3 March 2023
Championship record	Nataliya Dobrynska (UKR)	5013	Istanbul, Turkey	11 March 2012
World leading	Saga Vanninen (FIN)	4922	Apeldoorn, Netherlands	9 March 2025

== Results ==
=== 60 metres hurdles ===
The 60 metres hurdles were held on 21 March, starting at 10:05 (UTC+8) in the morning.

Rank	Heat	Name	Nationality	Time	Points	Notes
1	2	Taliyah Brooks	United States	8.09	1109	
2	2	Timara Chapman	United States	8.24	1075	
3	2	Kate O'Connor	Ireland	8.30	1061	PB
3	2	Saga Vanninen	Finland	8.30	1061	
3	1	Camryn Newton-Smith	Australia	8.30	1061	PB
6	2	Jana Koščak	Croatia	8.39	1041	
7	2	Célia Perron	France	8.48	1021	
8	1	Paulina Ligarska	Poland	8.51	1015	
9	1	Vanessa Grimm	Germany	8.54	1008	PB
9	1	Yuliya Loban	Ukraine	8.54	1008	
11	1	Szabina Szűcs	Hungary	8.58	1000	
12	2	Xénia Krizsán	Hungary	8.61	993	
13	1	Liu Jingyi	China	8.62	991	PB
14	1	Bianca Salming	Sweden	8.78	956	

=== High jump ===
The high jump was held on 21 March, starting at 10:45 (UTC+8) in the morning.

Rank	Name	Nationality	1.60	1.63	1.66	1.69	1.72	1.75	1.78	1.81	1.84	Result	Points	Notes	Total
1	Kate O'Connor	Ireland	–	–	o	o	o	o	o	o	xxx	1.81	991		2052
2	Timara Chapman	United States	–	–	–	–	o	o	o	xo	xxx	1.81	991	PB	2066
3	Saga Vanninen	Finland	–	–	–	–	xo	xo	xo	xo	xxx	1.81	991	PB	2052
4	Bianca Salming	Sweden	–	–	o	o	o	o	o	xxx		1.78	953	SB	1909
5	Taliyah Brooks	United States	–	–	–	o	o	xo	xo	xxx		1.78	953	SB	2062
6	Célia Perron	France	–	–	o	o	xxo	xxo	xo	xxx		1.78	953	SB	1974
7	Camryn Newton-Smith	Australia	–	–	–	o	o	o	xxo	xxx		1.78	953		2014
8	Szabina Szűcs	Hungary	–	–	o	o	xxo	o	xxx			1.75	916		1916
9	Paulina Ligarska	Poland	–	o	o	xo	o	xo	xxx			1.75	916		1931
10	Vanessa Grimm	Germany	–	o	o	o	xo	xxo	xxx			1.75	916	SB	1924
11	Jana Koščak	Croatia	–	–	o	–	o	xxx				1.72	879		1920
12	Xénia Krizsán	Hungary	o	o	o	o	xxx					1.69	842	SB	1835
12	Liu Jingyi	China	o	o	o	o	xxx					1.69	842		1833
14	Yuliia Loban	Ukraine	o	o	o	xxx						1.66	806		1814

=== Shot put ===
The shot put was held on 21 March, starting at 13:15 (UTC+8).

Rank	Name	Nationality	#1	#2	#3	Result	Points	Notes	Total
1	Saga Vanninen	Finland	15.20	14.59	15.81	15.81	915	SB	2967
2	Bianca Salming	Sweden	14.08	14.69	X	14.69	840		2749
3	Kate O'Connor	Ireland	13.57	14.64	13.95	14.64	837	PB	2889
4	Vanessa Grimm	Germany	14.63	14.51	14.62	14.63	836		2760
5	Taliyah Brooks	United States	X	14.08	14.39	14.39	820	PB	2882
6	Yuliia Loban	Ukraine	14.01	X	X	14.01	795		2609
7	Paulina Ligarska	Poland	13.98	X	X	13.98	793		2724
8	Xénia Krizsán	Hungary	12.46	13.12	13.29	13.29	747		2582
9	Timara Chapman	United States	12.72	13.23	12.81	13.23	743		2809
10	Camryn Newton-Smith	Australia	13.06	12.14	X	13.06	731	SB	2745
11	Szabina Szűcs	Hungary	11.60	13.06	11.97	13.06	731	SB	2647
12	Liu Jingyi	China	11.60	13.06	11.97	13.06	731	SB	2647
13	Célia Perron	France	12.06	X	X	12.06	665		2639
14	Jana Koščak	Croatia	11.20	11.27	12.05	12.05	664	SB	2584

=== Long jump ===
The long jump was held on 21 March, starting at 18:42 (UTC+8).

Rank	Name	Nationality	#1	#2	#3	Result	Points	Notes	Total
1	Saga Vanninen	Finland	5.81	6.37	6.33	6.37	965		3932
2	Taliyah Brooks	United States	6.16	6.35	X	6.35	959		3841
3	Kate O'Connor	Ireland	6.30	6.32	X	6.32	949	PB	3838
4	Jana Koščak	Croatia	X	6.26	5.99	6.26	930		3514
5	Szabina Szűcs	Hungary	X	X	6.22	6.22	918	SB	3565
6	Xénia Krizsán	Hungary	6.17	X	X	6.17	902	SB	3484
7	Vanessa Grimm	Germany	4.42	5.74	6.09	6.09	877	SB	3637
8	Célia Perron	France	X	X	6.07	6.07	871		3510
9	Liu Jingyi	China	6.04	5.97	6.01	6.04	862	PB	3421
10	Timara Chapman	United States	6.00	5.89	6.02	6.02	856		3665
11	Camryn Newton-Smith	Australia	5.73	5.91	X	5.91	822	SB	3567
12	Yuliia Loban	Ukraine	5.73	X	5.73	5.73	768		3377
13	Bianca Salming	Sweden	X	X	5.47	5.47	691		3440
	Paulina Ligarska	Poland	X	X	X	NM	0		2724

=== 800 metres ===
The 800 metres was held on 21 March, starting at 21:15 (UTC+8).

Rank	Name	Nationality	Time	Points	Notes	Total
1	Xénia Krizsán	Hungary	2:12.36	930	SB	4414
2	Célia Perron	France	2:12.84	923		4433
3	Kate O'Connor	Ireland	2:14.19	904		4742
4	Saga Vanninen	Finland	2:15.28	889		4821
5	Bianca Salming	Sweden	2:15.86	881		4321
6	Szabina Szűcs	Hungary	2:16.44	873	SB	4438
7	Paulina Ligarska	Poland	2:17.21	862		3586
8	Jana Koščak	Croatia	2:18.20	848		4362
9	Vanessa Grimm	Germany	2:18.50	844	SB	4481
10	Taliyah Brooks	United States	2:19.67	828		4669
11	Timara Chapman	United States	2:20.95	811		4476
12	Liu Jingyi	China	2:25.55	750	PB	4171
13	Yuliya Loban	Ukraine	2:25.76	747		4124

=== Final standings ===
Rank	Name	Nationality	Points	Notes
1st place, gold medalist(s)	Saga Vanninen	Finland	4821	
2nd place, silver medalist(s)	Kate O'Connor	Ireland	4742	
3rd place, bronze medalist(s)	Taliyah Brooks	United States	4669	PB
4	Vanessa Grimm	Germany	4481	SB
5	Timara Chapman	United States	4476	
6	Szabina Szűcs	Hungary	4438	SB
7	Célia Perron	France	4433	
8	Xénia Krizsán	Hungary	4414	SB
9	Jana Koščak	Croatia	4362	
10	Bianca Salming	Sweden	4321	
11	Liu Jingyi	China	4171	PB
12	Yuliya Loban	Ukraine	4124	
13	Paulina Ligarska	Poland	3586	
	Camryn Newton-Smith	Australia	DNF	
