= 1995 IAAF World Indoor Championships – Women's pentathlon =

The women's pentathlon event at the 1995 IAAF World Indoor Championships was held on 10 March.

== Medalists ==
| Gold | Silver | Bronze |
|---|---|---|
| Svetlana Moskalets; Russia | Kym Carter; United States | Irina Tyukhay; Russia |

== Results ==
=== 60 metres hurdles ===
| Rank | Heat | Name | Nationality | Time | Points | Notes |
|---|---|---|---|---|---|---|
| 1 | 2 | Svetlana Moskalets | Russia | 8.20 | 1084 | |
| 2 | 2 | Jamie McNeair | United States | 8.25 | 1073 | |
| 3 | 2 | Svetlana Buraga | Belarus | 8.27 | 1068 | |
| 4 | 1 | Liliana Năstase | Romania | 8.30 | 1061 | |
| 5 | 2 | Irina Tyukhay | Russia | 8.33 | 1055 | |
| 6 | 1 | Sharon Jaklofsky | Netherlands | 8.34 | 1052 | |
| 6 | 2 | Mona Steigauf | Germany | 8.34 | 1052 | |
| 8 | 1 | Kym Carter | United States | 8.37 | 1046 | |
| 9 | 2 | Karin Specht | Germany | 8.60 | 995 | |
| 10 | 1 | Anzhela Atroshchenko | Belarus | 8.71 | 971 | |
| 11 | 1 | Marcela Podracká | Slovakia | 8.81 | 950 | |
| 12 | 1 | Inma Clopes | Spain | 8.85 | 941 | |

=== High jump ===
| Rank | Athlete | Nationality | 1.64 | 1.67 | 1.70 | 1.73 | 1.76 | 1.79 | 1.82 | 1.85 | 1.88 | Result | Points | Notes | Total |
|---|---|---|---|---|---|---|---|---|---|---|---|---|---|---|---|
| 1 | Svetlana Moskalets | Russia | – | – | o | o | o | o | xo | xxo | xxo | 1.88 | 1080 | | 2164 |
| 2 | Karin Specht | Germany | – | o | o | o | o | o | o | xxx | | 1.82 | 1003 | | 1998 |
| 3 | Irina Tyukhay | Russia | – | o | o | xo | o | o | xxx | | | 1.79 | 966 | | 2021 |
| 3 | Kym Carter | United States | – | o | xo | o | o | o | xxx | | | 1.79 | 966 | | 2012 |
| 5 | Mona Steigauf | Germany | o | xxo | xxo | o | o | o | xxx | | | 1.79 | 966 | | 2018 |
| 6 | Marcela Podracká | Slovakia | o | o | o | o | o | xx | | | | 1.76 | 928 | | 1878 |
| 7 | Jamie McNeair | United States | o | o | o | o | xxo | xxx | | | | 1.76 | 928 | | 2001 |
| 8 | Anzhela Atroshchenko | Belarus | o | o | o | o | xxx | | | | | 1.73 | 891 | | 1862 |
| 8 | Inma Clopes | Spain | o | o | o | o | xxx | | | | | 1.73 | 891 | | 1832 |
| 10 | Sharon Jaklofsky | Netherlands | o | xo | o | xo | xxx | | | | | 1.73 | 891 | | 1943 |
| 11 | Svetlana Buraga | Belarus | o | xo | o | xxo | xxx | | | | | 1.73 | 891 | | 1959 |
| 12 | Liliana Năstase | Romania | xo | o | xxo | xxx | | | | | | 1.70 | 855 | | 1916 |

=== Shot put ===
| Rank | Athlete | Nationality | #1 | #2 | #3 | Result | Points | Notes | Total |
|---|---|---|---|---|---|---|---|---|---|
| 1 | Kym Carter | United States | 14.82 | 14.30 | 14.32 | 14.82 | 849 | | 2861 |
| 2 | Svetlana Moskalets | Russia | 13.95 | 14.05 | 14.41 | 14.41 | 821 | | 2985 |
| 3 | Marcela Podracká | Slovakia | 12.12 | 13.96 | x | 13.96 | 791 | | 2669 |
| 4 | Irina Tyukhay | Russia | 13.57 | 13.79 | 13.91 | 13.91 | 788 | | 2809 |
| 5 | Liliana Năstase | Romania | 13.18 | 13.89 | x | 13.89 | 787 | | 2703 |
| 6 | Svetlana Buraga | Belarus | x | 13.43 | 13.19 | 13.43 | 756 | | 2715 |
| 7 | Sharon Jaklofsky | Netherlands | 12.97 | 13.21 | 12.65 | 13.21 | 741 | | 2684 |
| 8 | Anzhela Atroshchenko | Belarus | 12.91 | 11.60 | 13.06 | 13.06 | 731 | | 2593 |
| 9 | Inma Clopes | Spain | 12.90 | 12.63 | x | 12.90 | 721 | | 2553 |
| 10 | Jamie McNeair | United States | 12.58 | 12.07 | 12.81 | 12.81 | 715 | | 2716 |
| 11 | Karin Specht | Germany | 11.52 | 11.43 | 11.89 | 11.89 | 654 | | 2652 |
| 12 | Mona Steigauf | Germany | 11.88 | 11.86 | 11.72 | 11.88 | 653 | | 2671 |

=== Long jump ===
| Rank | Athlete | Nationality | #1 | #2 | #3 | Result | Points | Notes | Total |
|---|---|---|---|---|---|---|---|---|---|
| 1 | Irina Tyukhay | Russia | 6.55 | x | 6.44 | 6.55 | 1023 | | 3832 |
| 2 | Svetlana Moskalets | Russia | 6.32 | 6.55 | 6.33 | 6.55 | 1023 | | 4008 |
| 3 | Anzhela Atroshchenko | Belarus | 6.25 | 6.48 | 6.34 | 6.48 | 1001 | | 3594 |
| 4 | Sharon Jaklofsky | Netherlands | 6.46 | 4.97 | 6.44 | 6.46 | 994 | | 3678 |
| 5 | Svetlana Buraga | Belarus | 6.34 | x | x | 6.34 | 956 | | 3671 |
| 6 | Liliana Năstase | Romania | 6.20 | x | 4.56 | 6.20 | 912 | | 3615 |
| 7 | Mona Steigauf | Germany | 6.17 | 5.86 | 6.02 | 6.17 | 902 | | 3573 |
| 8 | Kym Carter | United States | 5.74 | x | 6.11 | 6.11 | 883 | | 3744 |
| 9 | Jamie McNeair | United States | x | 5.81 | 5.91 | 5.91 | 822 | | 3538 |
| 10 | Karin Specht | Germany | 5.82 | 5.86 | 5.87 | 5.87 | 810 | | 3462 |
| 11 | Inma Clopes | Spain | x | 5.74 | 5.70 | 5.74 | 771 | | 3324 |
| 12 | Marcela Podracká | Slovakia | 4.17 | x | x | 4.17 | 347 | | 3016 |

=== 800 metres ===
| Rank | Heat | Name | Nationality | Time | Points | Notes |
|---|---|---|---|---|---|---|
| 1 | 2 | Kym Carter | United States | 2:15.34 | 888 | |
| 2 | 1 | Mona Steigauf | Germany | 2:16.48 | 872 | |
| 3 | 1 | Anzhela Atroshchenko | Belarus | 2:18.26 | 847 | |
| 4 | 2 | Liliana Năstase | Romania | 2:19.40 | 832 | |
| 5 | 1 | Jamie McNeair | United States | 2:19.76 | 827 | |
| 6 | 2 | Svetlana Moskalets | Russia | 2:19.78 | 826 | |
| 7 | 2 | Svetlana Buraga | Belarus | 2:22.15 | 795 | |
| 8 | 2 | Irina Tyukhay | Russia | 2:22.49 | 790 | |
| 9 | 1 | Karin Specht | Germany | 2:23.90 | 771 | |
| 10 | 2 | Sharon Jaklofsky | Netherlands | 2:25.04 | 756 | |
| 11 | 1 | Inma Clopes | Spain | 2:27.24 | 728 | |
| 12 | 1 | Marcela Podracká | Slovakia | 2:35.47 | 626 | |

=== Final standings ===
The highest mark recorded in each event is highlighted in yellow

| Rank | Athlete | Nationality | 60m H | HJ | SP | LJ | 800m | Points | Notes |
|---|---|---|---|---|---|---|---|---|---|
| 1st place, gold medalist(s) | Svetlana Moskalets | Russia | 8.20 | 1.88 | 14.41 | 6.55 | 2:19.78 | 4834 | CR |
| 2nd place, silver medalist(s) | Kym Carter | United States | 8.37 | 1.79 | 14.82 | 6.11 | 2:15.34 | 4632 | |
| 3rd place, bronze medalist(s) | Irina Tyukhay | Russia | 8.33 | 1.79 | 13.91 | 6.55 | 2:22.49 | 4622 | |
| 4 | Svetlana Buraga | Belarus | 8.27 | 1.73 | 13.43 | 6.34 | 2:22.15 | 4466 | |
| 5 | Liliana Năstase | Romania | 8.30 | 1.70 | 13.89 | 6.20 | 2:19.40 | 4447 | |
| 6 | Mona Steigauf | Germany | 8.34 | 1.79 | 11.88 | 6.17 | 2:16.48 | 4445 | |
| 7 | Anzhela Atroshchenko | Belarus | 8.71 | 1.73 | 13.06 | 6.48 | 2:18.26 | 4441 | |
| 8 | Sharon Jaklofsky | Netherlands | 8.34 | 1.73 | 13.21 | 6.46 | 2:25.04 | 4434 | |
| 9 | Jamie McNeair | United States | 8.25 | 1.76 | 12.81 | 5.91 | 2:19.76 | 4365 | |
| 10 | Karin Specht | Germany | 8.60 | 1.82 | 11.89 | 5.87 | 2:23.90 | 4233 | |
| 11 | Inma Clopes | Spain | 8.85 | 1.73 | 12.90 | 5.74 | 2:27.24 | 4052 | |
| 12 | Marcela Podracká | Slovakia | 8.81 | 1.76 | 13.96 | 4.17 | 2:35.47 | 3642 | |
