= 2025 World Athletics Championships – Women's heptathlon =

Women's heptathlon at the 2025 World Athletics Championships
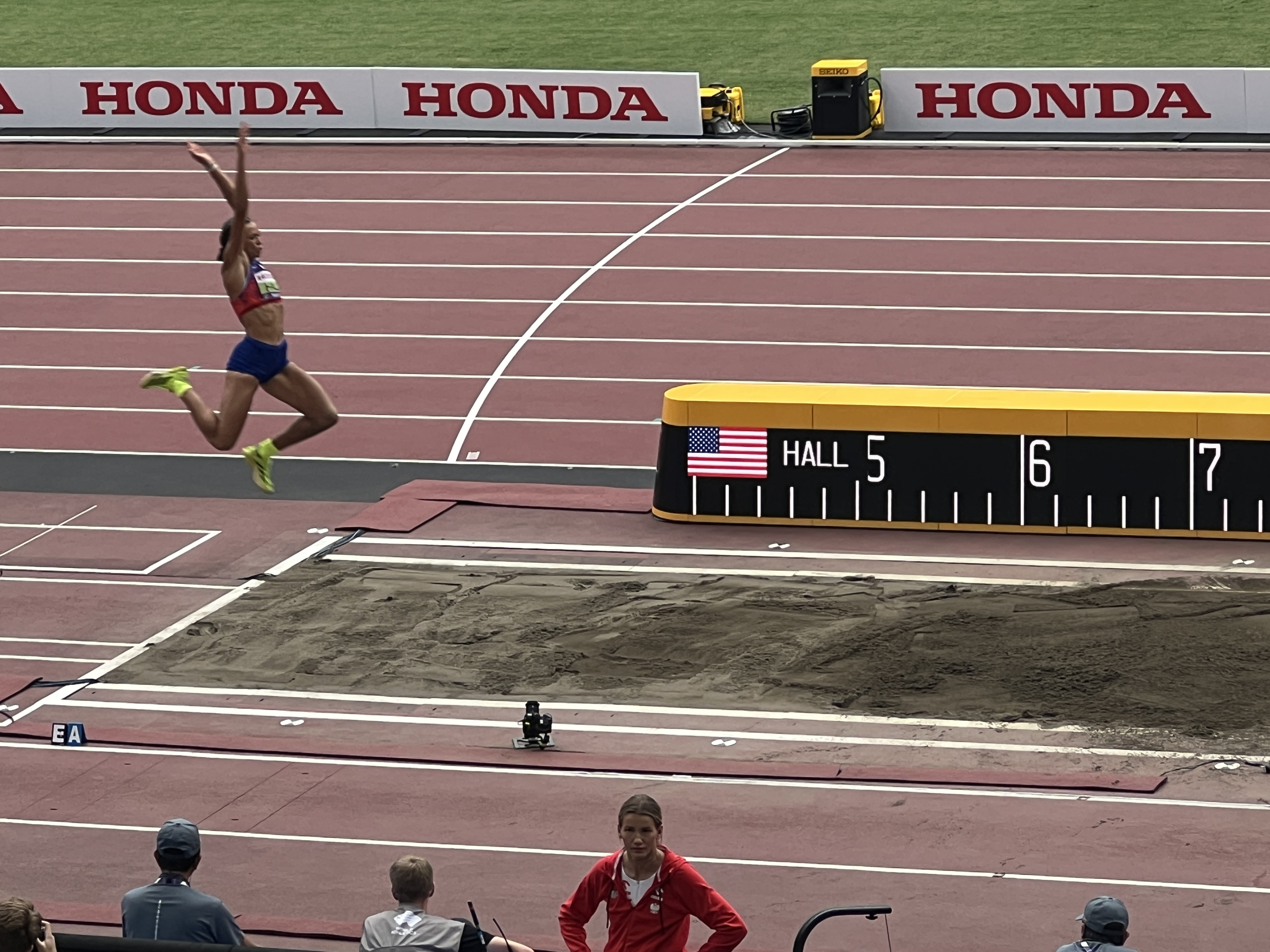
- Heptathlon winner Anna Hall competes in the long jump
- Venue: National Stadium
- Location: Tokyo, Japan
- Dates: 19 and 20 September
- Competitors: 24 from 17 nations
- Winning score: 6888 pts

Medalists
gold medal	Anna Hall	United States
silver medal	Kate O'Connor	Ireland
bronze medal	Katarina Johnson-Thompson	Great Britain
bronze medal	Taliyah Brooks	United States

The women's heptathlon at the 2025 World Athletics Championships was held at the National Stadium in Tokyo on 19 and 20 September 2025.

== Records ==
Before the competition records were as follows:

Record	Athlete & Nat.	Perf.	Location	Date
World record	Jackie Joyner-Kersee (USA)	7291 pts	Seoul, South Korea	24 September 1988
Championship record	Jackie Joyner-Kersee (USA)	7128 pts	Rome, Italy	1 September 1987
World Leading	Anna Hall (USA)	7032 pts	Götzis, Austria	1 June 2025
African Record	Margaret Simpson (GHA)	6423 pts	Götzis, Austria	29 May 2005
Asian Record	Ghada Shouaa (SYR)	6942 pts	Götzis, Austria	26 May 1996
European Record	Carolina Klüft (SWE)	7032 pts	Osaka, Japan	26 August 2007
North, Central American and Caribbean record	Jackie Joyner-Kersee (USA)	7291 pts	Seoul, South Korea	24 September 1988
South American Record	Martha Araújo (COL)	6475 pts	Götzis, Austria	1 June 2025
Oceanian Record	Jane Flemming (AUS)	6695 pts	Auckland, New Zealand	28 January 1990

== Qualification standard ==
The standard to qualify automatically for entry was 6500 points.

== Schedule ==
The event schedule, in local time (UTC+9), was as follows:

Date	Time	Round
19 September	17:33	100 metres hurdles
19 September	18:20	High jump
19 September	20:30	Shot put
19 September	21:38	200 metres
20 September	11:35	Long jump
20 September	19:00	Javelin throw
20 September	21:11	800 metres

== Results ==
=== Final standings ===
The final standings were as follows:

The highest mark recorded in each event is highlighted in yellow.

Rank	Athlete	Nationality	100mh	HJ	SP	200m	LJ	JT	800m	Total	Notes
1st place, gold medalist(s)	Anna Hall	United States	13.05	1.89 m	15.80 m	23.50	6.12 m	48.13 m	2:06.08	6888	
2nd place, silver medalist(s)	Kate O'Connor	Ireland	13.44	1.86 m	14.37 m	24.07	6.22 m	53.06 m	2:09.56	6714	NR
3rd place, bronze medalist(s)	Katarina Johnson-Thompson	Great Britain & N.I.	13.44	1.86 m	13.37 m	23.51	6.42 m	41.91 m	2:07.38	6581	SB
3rd place, bronze medalist(s)	Taliyah Brooks	United States	12.93	1.77 m	13.92 m	24.18	6.79 m	43.37 m	2:13.17	6581	PB
5	Sandrina Sprengel	Germany	13.60	1.77 m	14.29 m	24.36	6.25 m	51.66 m	2:15.95	6434	PB
6	Sofie Dokter	Netherlands	13.62	1.86 m	13.98 m	23.70	6.16 m	42.61 m	2:12.63	6432	
7	Saga Vanninen	Finland	13.44	1.80 m	14.59 m	24.78	5.97 m	47.14 m	2:09.33	6396	
8	Jade O'Dowda	Great Britain & N.I.	13.34	1.80 m	13.55 m	25.07	6.49 m	46.20 m	2:14.18	6391	PB
9	Emma Oosterwegel	Netherlands	13.28	1.74 m	13.34 m	24.03	5.94 m	50.19 m	2:09.48	6381	SB
10	Martha Araújo	Colombia	13.13	1.74 m	13.98 m	24.67	6.38 m	47.00 m	2:19.18	6324	
11	Michelle Atherley	United States	13.22	1.68 m	13.92 m	23.86	6.20 m	40.32 m	2:07.77	6287	
12	María Vicente	Spain	13.65	1.77 m	13.34 m	23.96	6.10 m	44.58 m	2:16.80	6207	
13	Sveva Gerevini	Italy	13.52	1.74 m	12.98 m	24.07	5.80 m	44.16 m	2:08.89	6167	SB
14	Beatričė Juškevičiūtė	Lithuania	13.03	1.62 m	14.17 m	23.80	5.76 m	46.66 m	2:14.90	6151	
15	Adrianna Sułek-Schubert	Poland	13.47	1.80 m	14.53 m	24.38	5.78 m	39.32 m	2:17.25	6105	
16	Camryn Newton-Smith	Australia	13.55	1.74 m	13.05 m	24.98	5.90 m	44.34 m	2:22.54	5925	
17	Tori West	Australia	13.81	1.71 m	13.21 m	24.36	5.64 m	44.31 m	2:27.24	5778	
18	Auriana Lazraq-Khlass	France	13.72	1.74 m	12.32 m	25.15	5.55 m	47.97 m	2:25.86	5758	
19	Pippi Lotta Enok	Estonia	13.86	NM	NM	24.71	5.84 m	41.70 m	2:18.35	4259	
	Timara Chapman	United States	13.74	1.71 m	12.32 m	25.10	5.37 m	40.92 m	DNS	DNF	
	Abigail Pawlett	Great Britain & N.I.	14.70	1.80 m	13.85 m	23.25	5.98 m	DNS		DNF	
	Nafissatou Thiam	Belgium	13.61	1.89 m	14.85 m	25.52	5.99 m	DNS		DNF	
	Vanessa Grimm	Germany	13.74	1.65 m	13.79 m	DNS				DNF	
	Annik Kälin	Switzerland								DNS	

=== 100 metres hurdles ===
Place	Heat	Athlete	Nation	Time	Notes	Points
1	3	Taliyah Brooks	United States	12.93		1135
2	3	Beatričė Juškevičiūtė	Lithuania	13.03	SB	1120
3	3	Anna Hall	United States	13.05	SB	1117
4	3	Martha Araújo	Colombia	13.13		1105
5	3	Michelle Atherley	United States	13.22		1091
6	2	Emma Oosterwegel	Netherlands	13.28	PB	1083
7	1	Jade O'Dowda	Great Britain & N.I.	13.34	PB	1074
8	3	Saga Vanninen	Finland	13.44 [.431]		1059
9	1	Katarina Johnson-Thompson	Great Britain & N.I.	13.44 [.434]	SB	1059
10	1	Kate O'Connor	Ireland	13.44 [.438]	PB	1059
11	2	Adrianna Sułek-Schubert	Poland	13.47		1055
12	1	Sveva Gerevini	Italy	13.52	SB	1047
13	2	Camryn Newton-Smith	Australia	13.55		1043
14	2	Sandrina Sprengel	Germany	13.60		1036
15	1	Nafissatou Thiam	Belgium	13.61	SB	1034
16	2	Sofie Dokter	Netherlands	13.62		1033
17	2	María Vicente	Spain	13.65		1028
18	2	Auriana Lazraq-Khlass	France	13.72		1018
19	2	Timara Chapman	United States	13.74 [.735]		1015
20	1	Vanessa Grimm	Germany	13.74 [.740]		1015
21	1	Tori West	Australia	13.81		1005
22	1	Pippi Lotta Enok	Estonia	13.86		998
23	3	Abigail Pawlett	Great Britain & N.I.	14.70		882
				Winds: (±0.0 m/s) / (−0.2 m/s) / (−0.7 m/s)		

=== High jump ===
Place	Group	Athlete	Nation	1.56	1.59	1.62	1.65	1.68	1.71	1.74	1.77	1.80	1.83	1.86	1.89	1.92	Mark	Points	Notes	Total points
1	A	Nafissatou Thiam	Belgium				–	–	–	–	o	o	xo	xxo	o	xxx	1.89 m	1093	SB	2127
2	A	Anna Hall	United States				–	–	–	o	o	o	o	xo	xxo	xxx	1.89 m	1093		2210
3	A	Sofie Dokter	Netherlands				–	–	o	o	o	xo	xo	xo	xxx		1.86 m	1054	SB	2087
4	A	Kate O'Connor	Ireland				–	o	o	o	o	o	o	xxo	xxx		1.86 m	1054	PB	2113
5	A	Katarina Johnson-Thompson	Great Britain & N.I.				–	–	–	–	o	xo	o	xxo	xxx		1.86 m	1054	SB	2113
6	A	Saga Vanninen	Finland				–	–	o	o	o	o	xxx				1.80 m	978		2037
7	B	Abigail Pawlett	Great Britain & N.I.	–	–	–	o	o	o	o	o	xxo	xxx				1.80 m	978	PB	1860
8	B	Adrianna Sułek-Schubert	Poland	–	–	–	–	–	o	o	o	xxo	xxx				1.80 m	978	SB	2033
9	A	Jade O'Dowda	Great Britain & N.I.				–	o	o	o	o	xxo	xxx				1.80 m	978		2052
10	B	Sandrina Sprengel	Germany	–	–	–	o	xo	o	o	o	xxx					1.77 m	941	SB	1977
11	A	Taliyah Brooks	United States				–	–	xo	o	xo	xxx					1.77 m	941		2076
12	A	María Vicente	Spain				–	–	o	xo	xxo	xxx					1.77 m	941		1969
13	B	Emma Oosterwegel	Netherlands	–	–	o	o	o	o	o	xxx						1.74 m	903	SB	1986
14	B	Sveva Gerevini	Italy	–	o	o	xo	xxo	o	o	xxx						1.74 m	903	SB	1950
15	B	Auriana Lazraq-Khlass	France	–	–	o	o	o	o	xo	xxx						1.74 m	903		1921
16	A	Camryn Newton-Smith	Australia				o	o	xo	xo	xxx						1.74 m	903		1946
17	B	Martha Araújo	Colombia	–	–	o	o	o	xo	xxo	xxx						1.74 m	903		2008
18	A	Timara Chapman	United States				–	–	o	xxx							1.71 m	867		1882
19	B	Tori West	Australia	–	–	o	o	o	xo	xxx							1.71 m	867		1872
20	B	Michelle Atherley	United States	–	–	–	o	o	xxx								1.68 m	830		1921
21	B	Vanessa Grimm	Germany	–	–	–	o	xxx									1.65 m	795		1810
22	B	Beatričė Juškevičiūtė	Lithuania	o	o	o	xxx										1.62 m	759		1879
—	A	Pippi Lotta Enok	Estonia				xxx										NM	0		998

=== Shot put ===
Place	Group	Athlete	Nation	Round			Result	Points	Notes	Total points
Place	Group	Athlete	Nation	1	2	3	Result	Points	Notes	Total points
1	A	Anna Hall	United States	15.32	x	15.80	15.80 m	915	PB	3125
2	A	Nafissatou Thiam	Belgium	14.85	14.56	x	14.85 m	851	SB	2978
3	A	Saga Vanninen	Finland	14.23	14.00	14.59	14.59 m	833		2870
4	A	Adrianna Sułek-Schubert	Poland	14.53	x	x	14.53 m	829	PB	2862
5	A	Kate O'Connor	Ireland	14.37	14.26	13.75	14.37 m	819		2932
6	A	Sandrina Sprengel	Germany	14.29	14.12	x	14.29 m	813	PB	2790
7	A	Beatričė Juškevičiūtė	Lithuania	14.17	14.09	13.86	14.17 m	805		2684
8	B	Martha Araújo	Colombia	11.82	13.79	13.98	13.98 m	793	SB	2801
9	B	Sofie Dokter	Netherlands	13.18	12.47	13.98	13.98 m	793		2880
10	A	Taliyah Brooks	United States	13.92	13.67	13.67	13.92 m	789		2865
11	A	Michelle Atherley	United States	13.24	13.92	x	13.92 m	789		2710
12	A	Abigail Pawlett	Great Britain & N.I.	11.96	13.85	12.92	13.85 m	784		2644
13	A	Vanessa Grimm	Germany	13.39	x	13.79	13.79 m	780		2590
14	B	Jade O'Dowda	Great Britain & N.I.	13.55	13.44	13.01	13.55 m	764		2816
15	B	Katarina Johnson-Thompson	Great Britain & N.I.	13.37	12.26	12.73	13.37 m	752	SB	2865
16	B	María Vicente	Spain	13.23	13.34	12.89	13.34 m	750		2719
17	A	Emma Oosterwegel	Netherlands	12.12	12.28	13.34	13.34 m	750		2736
18	B	Tori West	Australia	12.34	12.69	13.41	13.41 m	741	SB	2613
19	B	Camryn Newton-Smith	Australia	12.57	13.05	13.02	13.05 m	731		2677
20	B	Sveva Gerevini	Italy	12.60	12.46	12.98	12.98 m	726		2676
21	B	Auriana Lazraq-Khlass	France	11.90	x	12.32	12.32 m	682		2603
22	B	Timara Chapman	United States	11.64	12.32	x	12.32 m	682		2564
—	B	Pippi Lotta Enok	Estonia	x	x	x	NM	0		998

=== 200 metres ===
Place	Heat	Athlete	Nation	Time	Points	Notes	Total points
1	3	Abigail Pawlett	Great Britain & N.I.	23.25	1054		3698
2	3	Anna Hall	United States	23.50	1029		4154
3	3	Katarina Johnson-Thompson	Great Britain & N.I.	23.51	1028	SB	3893
4	3	Sofie Dokter	Netherlands	23.70	1010		3890
5	3	Beatričė Juškevičiūtė	Lithuania	23.80	1000		3684
6	3	Michelle Atherley	United States	23.86	994		3704
7	2	María Vicente	Spain	23.96	985	SB	3704
8	1	Emma Oosterwegel	Netherlands	24.03	978	PB	3714
9	1	Kate O'Connor	Ireland	24.07 [.065]	974	PB	3906
10	1	Sveva Gerevini	Italy	24.07 [.067]	974	SB	3650
11	3	Taliyah Brooks	United States	24.18	963		3828
12	1	Sandrina Sprengel	Germany	24.36 [.352]	946	SB	3736
13	2	Tori West	Australia	24.36 [.357]	946		3559
14	2	Adrianna Sułek-Schubert	Poland	24.38	945		3807
15	2	Martha Araújo	Colombia	24.67	917		3718
16	2	Pippi Lotta Enok	Estonia	24.71	914		1912
17	1	Saga Vanninen	Finland	24.78	907		3777
18	1	Camryn Newton-Smith	Australia	24.98	889	SB	3566
19	1	Jade O'Dowda	Great Britain & N.I.	25.07	880	SB	3696
20	2	Timara Chapman	United States	25.10	878		3442
21	2	Auriana Lazraq-Khlass	France	25.15	873		3476
22	1	Nafissatou Thiam	Belgium	25.52	840	SB	3818
—	2	Vanessa Grimm	Germany	DNS			
				Winds: (+0.2 m/s) / (−0.3 m/s) / (+0.4 m/s)			

=== Long jump ===
Place	Group	Athlete	Nation	Round			Result	Points	Notes	Total points
Place	Group	Athlete	Nation	1	2	3	Result	Points	Notes	Total points
1	A	Taliyah Brooks	United States	6.23	6.79	x	6.79 m	1102	PB	4930
2	A	Jade O'Dowda	Great Britain & N.I.	x	6.49	x	6.49 m	1004	SB	4700
3	A	Katarina Johnson-Thompson	Great Britain & N.I.	6.38	6.42	x	6.42 m	981		4874
4	A	Martha Araújo	Colombia	6.33	6.36	6.38	6.38 m	969		4687
5	A	Sandrina Sprengel	Germany	6.13	6.25	5.93	6.25 m	927		4663
6	B	Kate O'Connor	Ireland	x	6.17	6.22	6.22 m	918		4824
7	B	Michelle Atherley	United States	6.10	6.20	6.15	6.20 m	912	SB	4616
8	A	Sofie Dokter	Netherlands	6.15	x	6.16	6.16 m	899		4789
9	A	Anna Hall	United States	5.72	6.12	5.98	6.12 m	887		5041
10	A	María Vicente	Spain	6.00	6.10	x	6.10 m	880		4584
11	A	Nafissatou Thiam	Belgium	5.99	x	x	5.99 m	846		4664
12	A	Abigail Pawlett	Great Britain & N.I.	5.98	x	x	5.98 m	843		4541
13	A	Saga Vanninen	Finland	5.84	5.97	x	5.97 m	840		4617
14	B	Emma Oosterwegel	Netherlands	5.93	5.94	5.89	5.94 m	831		4545
15	B	Camryn Newton-Smith	Australia	5.67	5.90	5.74	5.90 m	819		4385
16	B	Pippi Lotta Enok	Estonia	5.60	5.84	5.84	5.84	801		2713
17	B	Sveva Gerevini	Italy	5.72	5.80	5.75	5.80 m	789		4439
18	B	Adrianna Sułek-Schubert	Poland	5.71	x	5.78	5.78 m	783		4590
19	B	Beatričė Juškevičiūtė	Lithuania	x	x	5.76	5.76 m	777		4461
20	B	Tori West	Australia	5.64	5.47	4.71	5.64 m	741		4300
21	B	Auriana Lazraq-Khlass	France	5.55	x	x	5.55 m	715		4191
22	B	Timara Chapman	United States	5.37	x	5.35	5.37 m	663		4105

=== Javelin throw ===
Place	Athlete	Nation	Round			Result	Points	Notes	Total points
Place	Athlete	Nation	1	2	3	Result	Points	Notes	Total points
1	Kate O'Connor	Ireland	53.06	51.33	x	53.06 m	919	PB	5743
2	Sandrina Sprengel	Germany	51.66	–	–	51.66 m	892	PB	5555
3	Emma Oosterwegel	Netherlands	48.74	50.19	x	50.19 m	864		5409
4	Anna Hall	United States	43.28	46.33	48.13	48.13 m	824	PB	5865
5	Auriana Lazraq-Khlass	France	x	42.70	47.97	47.97 m	821	SB	5012
6	Saga Vanninen	Finland	36.38	39.94	47.14	47.14 m	805	SB	5422
7	Martha Araújo	Colombia	42.37	46.91	47.00	47.00 m	802		5489
8	Beatričė Juškevičiūtė	Lithuania	46.66	44.38	44.18	46.66 m	796		5257
9	Jade O'Dowda	Great Britain & N.I.	40.40	42.49	46.20	46.20 m	787	PB	5487
10	María Vicente	Spain	43.25	44.58	43.04	44.58 m	755		5339
11	Camryn Newton-Smith	Australia	42.73	44.34	43.51	44.34 m	751		5136
12	Tori West	Australia	38.73	44.31	42.34	44.31 m	750		5050
13	Sveva Gerevini	Italy	37.77	44.16	41.02	44.16 m	747	PB	5186
14	Taliyah Brooks	United States	43.37	41.70	43.06	43.37 m	732	PB	5662
15	Sofie Dokter	Netherlands	36.01	42.61	41.69	42.61 m	717	SB	5506
16	Katarina Johnson-Thompson	Great Britain & N.I.	38.82	40.51	41.91	41.91 m	704		5578
17	Pippi Lotta Enok	Estonia	x	37.80	41.70	41.70 m	700		3413
18	Timara Chapman	United States	40.92	39.15	40.59	40.92 m	685		4790
19	Michelle Atherley	United States	40.32	38.06	x	40.32 m	673		5289
20	Adrianna Sułek-Schubert	Poland	38.27	39.32	x	39.32 m	654	SB	5244

=== 800 metres ===
Place	Athlete	Nation	Time	Points	Notes	Total points
1	Anna Hall	United States	2:06.08	1023		6888
2	Katarina Johnson-Thompson	Great Britain & N.I.	2:07.38	1003	SB	6581
3	Michelle Atherley	United States	2:07.77	998		6287
4	Sveva Gerevini	Italy	2:08.89	981		6167
5	Saga Vanninen	Finland	2:09.33	974	PB	6396
6	Emma Oosterwegel	Netherlands	2:09.48	972	SB	6381
7	Kate O'Connor	Ireland	2:09.56	971	PB	6714
8	Sofie Dokter	Netherlands	2:12.63	926		6432
9	Taliyah Brooks	United States	2:13.17	919	PB	6581
10	Jade O'Dowda	Great Britain & N.I.	2:14.18	904	SB	6391
11	Beatričė Juškevičiūtė	Lithuania	2:14.90	894		6151
12	Sandrina Sprengel	Germany	2:15.95	879	PB	6434
13	María Vicente	Spain	2:16.80	868		6207
14	Adrianna Sułek-Schubert	Poland	2:17.25	861		6105
15	Pippi Lotta Enok	Estonia	2:18.35	846		4259
16	Martha Araújo	Colombia	2:19.18	835		6324
17	Camryn Newton-Smith	Australia	2:22.54	789	SB	5925
18	Auriana Lazraq-Khlass	France	2:25.86	746		5758
19	Tori West	Australia	2:27.24	728		5778
—	Timara Chapman	United States	DNS			
