= Athletics at the 2003 Pan American Games – Women's heptathlon =

Women's heptathlon at the Pan American Games

The Women's Heptathlon event at the 2003 Pan American Games took place on Thursday August 7 and Friday August 8, 2003.

== Medalists ==
| Gold | Tiffany Lott-Hogan; United States |
| Silver | Nicole Haynes; Canada |
| Bronze | Magalys García; Cuba |

== Records ==
| World Record | Jackie Joyner-Kersee (USA) | 7291 | September 24, 1988 | Seoul, South Korea |
| Pan Am Record | Magalys García (CUB) | 6290 | July 28, 1999 | Winnipeg, Canada |

== Results ==
| Rank | Athlete | Heptathlon | | | | | | | Points |
| Rank | Athlete | 100m h | HJ | SP | 200m | LJ | JT | 800m | Points |
|---|---|---|---|---|---|---|---|---|---|
| 1 | Tiffany Lott-Hogan (USA) | 13.15 | 1.68 | 13.78 | 24.59 | 6.02 | 49.52 | 2:27.74 | 6064 |
| 2 | Nicole Haynes (CAN) | 14.03 | 1.74 | 14.87 | 26.04 | 5.89 | 48.40 | 2:21.65 | 5959 |
| 3 | Magalys García (CUB) | 13.61 | 1.71 | 13.69 | 24.44 | 5.61 | 45.79 | 2:26.26 | 5864 |
| 4 | Judith Méndez (DOM) | 14.10 | 1.65 | 13.34 | 24.52 | 5.38 | 47.24 | 2:16.56 | 5783 |
| 5 | Yuleidis Limonta (CUB) | 13.95 | 1.74 | 12.11 | 24.98 | 5.99 | 31.33 | 2:29.23 | 5496 |
| 6 | Thaimara Rivas (VEN) | 14.36 | 1.68 | 12.56 | 25.89 | 5.88 | 38.62 | 2:25.16 | 5472 |
| 7 | Francia Manzanillo (DOM) | 14.34 | 1.59 | 10.14 | 25.63 | 5.72 | 44.32 | 2:20.28 | 5359 |
| 8 | Valeria Steffens (CHI) | 15.23 | 1.62 | 12.10 | 25.91 | 5.20 | 34.99 | 2:24.75 | 4988 |
| — | Melissa Vanek (USA) | 14.06 | 1.74 | — | — | — | — | — | DNF |

== See also ==
- 2003 Hypo-Meeting
- 2003 World Championships in Athletics – Women's heptathlon
- Athletics at the 2004 Summer Olympics – Women's heptathlon
