= Imma Clopés =

Spanish athletics competitor

Personal information
- Born: 19 January 1968 (age 58) Pedret i Marzà, Catalonia, Spain

Sport
- Sport: Heptathlon

Imma Clopés Gasull (born 19 January 1968) is a retired heptathlete and pentathlete. She competed at the 1996 and 2000 Summer Olympics.

== Achievements ==
Year	Competition	Venue	Position	Event	Notes
Representing Spain
1994	Ibero-American Championships	Mar del Plata, Argentina	3rd	Heptathlon	5173 pts
1995	World Indoor Championships	Barcelona, Spain	11th	Pentathlon	4052 pts
1996	Olympic Games	Atlanta, Georgia, United States	24th	Heptathlon	5602 pts
1997	Mediterranean Games	Bari, Italy	4th	Heptathlon	5725 pts
1997	World Championships	Athens, Greece	16th	Heptathlon	5631 pts
1998	European Indoor Championships	Valencia, Spain	7th	Pentathlon	4234 pts
1998	European Championships	Budapest, Hungary	14th	Heptathlon	5645 pts
2000	Olympic Games	Sydney, Australia	—	Heptathlon	DNF

=== Personal bests ===
- 200 metres – 25.42 (+2.0 m/s) (Lisbon 1998)
- 800 metres – 2:20.55 (Tallinn 1997)
- 100 metres hurdles – 14.14 (+1.5 m/s) (Tallinn 1996)
- High jump – 1.82 (Alhama de Murcia 1996)
- Long jump – 6.09 (+1.7 m/s) (Alhama de Murcia 1995)
- Shot put – 14.12 (Alhama de Murcia 1997)
- Javelin throw – 43.12 (Logroño 2000)
- Heptathlon – 5843 (Logroño 2000)
