= Athletics at the 1995 Pan American Games – Women's heptathlon =

Women's heptathlon at the Pan American Games

The women's heptathlon event at the 1995 Pan American Games was held at the Estadio Atletico "Justo Roman" on 21 and 22 March.

== Results ==
The highest mark recorded in each event is highlighted in yellow

Rank	Athlete	Nationality	100m H	HJ	SP	200m	LJ	JT	800m	Points	Notes
1st place, gold medalist(s)	Jamie McNeair	United States	13.18	1.77	12.82	24.25	6.20	45.40	2:16.39	6266	GR
2nd place, silver medalist(s)	Magalys García	Cuba	13.25	1.62	12.85	23.67	5.84	51.18	2:22.15	6055	
3rd place, bronze medalist(s)	DeDee Nathan	United States	13.86	1.77	13.97	24.66	6.03	31.76	2:17.30	5879	
4	Esther Medema	Canada	14.21	1.59	11.22	25.15	5.84	36.26	2:25.55	5302	
5	Alejandra García	Argentina	14.32	1.74	10.67	26.22	5.51	30.18	2:26.39	5139	
