= Nicole Haynes =

Canadian heptathlete

Personal information
- Born: September 18, 1974 (age 51) Toronto, Canada

Sport
- Sport: Track and field
Medal record
Women's athletics
Representing Canada
Pan American Games
Silver medal – second place	2003 Santo Domingo	Heptathlon
Representing the United States
Pan American Games
Bronze medal – third place	1999 Winnipeg	Heptathlon

Nicole Haynes (born September 18, 1974, in Toronto, Ontario) is a retired female track and field athlete from the United States, who competed in the heptathlon. She set a personal best at the 2000 Olympic Trials, where she placed 5th. After 2000, she switched her athletic eligibility to her native Canada. She subsequently won a silver medal in the 2003 Pan Am Games. She won 1990 Mt. SAC Relays high school Heptathlon scoring 4315 for Bishop Montgomery High School.

Haynes is now a television sports reporter. She was hired in 2006 by the ABC affiliate WSYR-TV in Syracuse, NY.

She is currently a freelance reporter in Los Angeles, California, for FSN West and FSN Prime Ticket and has done freelance work for the NFL Network.

Haynes graduated from the University of Southern California in 1996 and earned her Master of Education degree from CSU Dominguez Hills in 2004.
