= Athletics at the 1999 Pan American Games – Women's heptathlon =

Women's heptathlon at the Pan American Games

The women's heptathlon event at the 1999 Pan American Games was held July 27–28.

== Results ==
The highest mark recorded in each event is highlighted in yellow

Rank	Athlete	Nationality	100m H	HJ	SP	200m	LJ	JT	800m	Points	Notes
1st place, gold medalist(s)	Magalys García	Cuba	13.47	1.70	14.02	23.89	5.87	51.05	2:14.22	6290	GR
2nd place, silver medalist(s)	Shelia Burrell	United States	13.45	1.67	13.09	23.32	5.87	47.56	2:11.19	6244	
3rd place, bronze medalist(s)	Nicole Haynes	United States	14.20	1.79	14.80	25.17	5.89	40.12	2:15.99	6000	
4	Euzinete dos Reis	Brazil	14.16	1.73	11.45	24.41	5.76	45.14	2:20.19	5778	
5	Catherine Bond-Mills	Canada	14.14	1.73	12.94	25.08	5.78	38.31	2:18.47	5714	
6	Kim Vanderhoek	Canada	14.11	1.61	13.10	24.78	5.68	41.75	2:29.37	5506	
7	Neisha Thompson	Jamaica	14.30	1.55	11.01	24.92	5.28	36.68	2:24.43	5109	
8	Minerva Navarrete	Chile	15.23	1.52	10.10	25.95	5.39	35.64	2:20.78	4858	
