= Magalys García =

Cuban heptathlete (born 1971)

Personal information
- Born: 23 October 1971 (age 54) Songo – La Maya, Cuba

Sport
- Sport: Track and field
Medal record
Athletics
Representing Cuba
Pan American Games
Gold medal – first place	1999 Winnipeg	Heptathlon
Silver medal – second place	1995 Mar del Plata	Heptathlon
Silver medal – second place	2003 Santo Domingo	Heptathlon
Bronze medal – third place	1991 Havana	Heptathlon
Central American and Caribbean Games
Gold medal – first place	1993 Ponce	Heptathlon
Gold medal – first place	1998 Maracaibo	Heptathlon
Silver medal – second place	1990 Mexico City	Heptathlon
CAC Junior Championships (U20)
Gold medal – first place	1990 Havana	Heptathlon

Magalys García Leliebre (Spanish pronunciation: [maˈɣalis ɣaɾˈsi.a leˈljeβɾe]; born 23 October 1971) is a retired Cuban heptathlete.

In 2002, García scored 7,245 points at a women's decathlon in Vienna to set the Cuban record in the event.

== International competitions ==
Year	Competition	Venue	Position	Event	Notes
Representing Cuba
1990	Central American and Caribbean Junior Championships (U-20)	Havana, Cuba	1st	Heptathlon	5517 pts
1990	Central American and Caribbean Games	Mexico City, Mexico	2nd	Heptathlon	5528 pts A
1990	World Junior Championships	Plovdiv, Bulgaria	5th	Heptathlon	5476 pts
1991	Pan American Games	Havana, Cuba	3rd	Heptathlon	5690 pts
1993	Central American and Caribbean Games	Ponce, Puerto Rico	1st	Heptathlon	5903 pts
1995	World Championships	Gothenburg, Sweden	—	Heptathlon	DNF
1995	Pan American Games	Mar del Plata, Argentina	2nd	Heptathlon	6055 pts
1996	Olympic Games	Atlanta, United States	15th	Heptathlon	6109 pts
1998	Central American and Caribbean Games	Maracaibo, Venezuela	1st	Heptathlon	5888 pts
1999	Pan American Games	Winnipeg, Canada	1st	Heptathlon	6290 pts CR
1999	World Championships	Seville, Spain	12th	Heptathlon	6159 pts
2000	Olympic Games	Sydney, Australia	11th	Heptathlon	6054 pts SB
2003	Pan American Games	Santo Domingo, Dom. Rep.	2nd	Heptathlon	5864 pts

=== Personal bests ===
- 200 metres – 23.67 (Mar del Plata 1995)
- 800 metres – 2:13.58 (Havana 1996)
- 100 metres hurdles – 13.18 (Guatemala City 1995)
- High jump – 1.75 (Havana 1996)
- Long jump – 5.99 (Havana 1990)
- Shot put – 14.11 (Maracaibo 1998)
- Javelin throw – 51.05 (Winnipeg 1999)
- Heptathlon – 6352 (Havana 1996)
