= Shelby Frank =

American athlete (born 2002)

Personal information
- Born: 2 June 2002 (age 24)

Sport
- Country: United States
- Sport: Athletics (track and field)
- Events: Discus throw; Hammer throw

Achievements and titles
- Personal best(s): Discus 63.37 m (Eugene, 2023); Hammer 71.05 m (Eugene, 2025)
Medal record
Women's athletics
Representing United States
NACAC U23 Championships
Silver medal – second place	2023 San Jose	Discus throw

Shelby Frank (born 1 June 2002) is an American track and field athlete who competes in the discus throw and the hammer throw.

== Career ==
She is from Grand Forks, North Dakota. She was a five-time All American with the University of Minnesota before transferring to Texas Tech University.

She was a silver medalist at the 2023 NACAC U23 Championships in San Jose, Costa Rica with a discus throw of 56.96 metres.

She placed fifth in the discus throw at the US Olympic Trials in June 2024 in Eugene, Oregon, and was the only woman to reach the final of both the discus throw and the hammer throw at the trials.

She was runner-up in the weight throw at the NCAA Division I Indoor Track and Field Championships in 2023 and 2024 whilst competing for Minnesota, before she transferred to Texas Tech and finished fifth in 2025.

In May 2025, she threw a personal best 70.37 metres to win the hammer throw Big 12 Conference title, becoming the first Texas Texh athlete to win the title. She also won the discus throw at the championships with 62.14 metres. She was subsequently runner-up to Stephanie Ratcliffe in the hammer throw with 71.05 metres and finished third, also throwing a personal best of 63.37 metres, behind Jorinde Van Klinken and Cierra Jackson in the discus at the 2025 NCAA Division I Outdoor Track and Field Championships in Eugene, Oregon in June 2025.

She placed fourth in the discus at the 2025 USA Outdoor Track and Field Championships in Eugene, Oregon on 3 August 2025 with a throw of 61.11 metres. In September 2025, she competed at the 2025 World Athletics Championships in Tokyo, Japan, without reaching the final.

== Personal life ==
She is in a relationship with fellow American thrower Marcus Gustaveson.
