= Marcus Gustaveson =

American discus thrower (born 1997)

Personal information
- Nationality: American
- Born: December 1, 1997 (age 28)

Sport
- Sport: Track and field
- Event: Discus throw

Achievements and titles
- Personal best(s): Discus: 69.00 (Ramona, 2025)

Marcus Gustaveson (born 1 December 1997) is an American discus thrower. He placed third at the 2025 USA Outdoor Track and Field Championships.

== Early life ==
He attended Wheaton North High School in Chicago before competing for the Concordia University, St. Paul, where he combined athletics with American football. He based himself in Colorado with his parents when the COVID-19 pandemic caused the dissolution of the athletics competitions.

== Career ==
He had a personal best of 51.08 metres in the discus throw when he won the Alan Connie Shamrock Invitational in March 2021 with a throw of 58.51 metres to briefly become an early national leader in the event and became the first Concordia-St. Paul athlete to be named National Athlete of the Week by The U.S. Track & Field and Cross Country Coaches Association (USTFCCCA).

He finished ninth at the US Track and Field Championships in 2023 in Eugene, Oregon with a throw of 59.05 metres.

Gustaveson finished sixth in the men's discus at the 2024 USA Olympic Team Trials in June 2024 in Eugene, Oregon with a throw of 65.39 metres.

He threw a personal best of 69.00 metres in Ramona, Oklahoma in June 2025 as well as 70.63 metres in Texas and a meeting uncertified by World Athletics.

He finished third in the discus throw at the 2025 USA Outdoor Track and Field Championships in Eugene, Oregon with a throw of 64.51 metres. In September 2025, he competed in the discus throw at the 2025 World Championships in Tokyo, Japan, without advancing to the final.

== Personal life ==
In 2022, he worked as throws coach at Coronado High School in California. He is in a relationship with fellow American discus thrower Shelby Frank with the pair living in Lubbock, Texas in 2025.
