= Svetlana Moskalets =

Russian heptathlete (born 1969)

Personal information
- Born: 22 January 1969 (age 57) Mytishchi, Soviet Union

Sport
- Country: Russia
- Sport: Women's athletics
Medal record
World Championships
Silver medal – second place	1995 Gothenburg	Heptathlon
World Indoor Championships
Gold medal – first place	1995 Barcelona	Pentathlon

Svetlana Moskalets (Russian: Светлана Москалец; born 22 January 1969) is a retired Russian heptathlete.

She finished fifth at the 1994 European Athletics Championships, won the gold medal at the 1995 World Indoor Championships, the silver medal at the 1995 World Championships and finished fourteenth at the 1996 Olympic Games. She also participated at the 1997 World Championships without finishing the competition.

Her personal best score was 6598 points, achieved in June 1994 in Vladimir.

== See also ==
- List of World Athletics Championships medalists (women)
- List of IAAF World Indoor Championships medalists (women)
