= Jamie McNeair =

American heptathlete

Personal information
- Born: June 26, 1969 (age 57) Buffalo, New York, United States

Sport
- Sport: Track and field
Medal record
Women's Heptathlon
Representing United States
Pan American Games
Gold medal – first place	1995 Mar del Plata	Heptathlon

Jamie McNeair (born June 26, 1969) is a retired female heptathlete from the United States, who won the gold medal at the 1995 Pan American Games in Mar del Plata, Argentina. She set her personal best (6374 points) in the heptathlon on 29 July 1995 at a meet in Colorado Springs. She was born in Buffalo, New York.

McNeair was an All-American athlete for the Purdue Boilermakers track and field team, finishing 3rd in the heptathlon at the 1988 and 1990 NCAA Division I Outdoor Track and Field Championships.
