= Timara Chapman =

American heptathlete (born 2000)

Personal information
- Born: 9 May 2000 (age 26)
- Height: 180 cm (5 ft 11 in)

Sport
- Sport: Athletics
- Event: Heptathlon
- College team: North Carolina State University Texas A&M University

Achievements and titles
- Personal bests: Heptathlon: 6339 (Eugene, 2024); Pentathlon: 4603 (Indianapolis, 2026)

Timara Chapman (born 9 May 2000) is an American multi-event athlete. She was the 2024 NCAA champion in the heptathlon and the American pentathlon champion at the 2025 USA Indoor Championships.

== Early life ==
She is from Raleigh, North Carolina, where she attended Leesville Road High School. In 2018, she set a North Carolina Heptathlon State Record in finishing runner-up at the New Balance Outdoor Nationals, with a score of 5014 points

== Career ==
Competing for Texas A&M University, she won the 2024 NCAA Division I Outdoor Track and Field Championships heptathlon title in 2024, ahead of double NCAA pentathlon champion Jadin O'Brien. She finished eighth in the heptathlon at the US Olympic Trials in June 2024.

She won the pentathlon on the opening day of the 2025 USA Indoor Track and Field Championships in New York, with a tally of 4555 points. She was selected for the 2025 World Athletics Indoor Championships in Nanjing in March 2025.

In September 2025, she competed at the 2025 World Championships in Tokyo, Japan. She placed tenth overall in the season-long World Athletics Combined Events Tour for 2025.

Chapman scored a personal best 4603 points for the pentathlon at the 2026 USATF Combined Events Championships on 22 February, finishing behind Anna Hall. On 24 July, she placed second in heptathlon at the 2026 USA Outdoor Track and Field Championships in New York, scoring 6,021 points, 38 behind Erin Marsh.
