= Taliyah Brooks =

American multi-event athlete (born 1995)

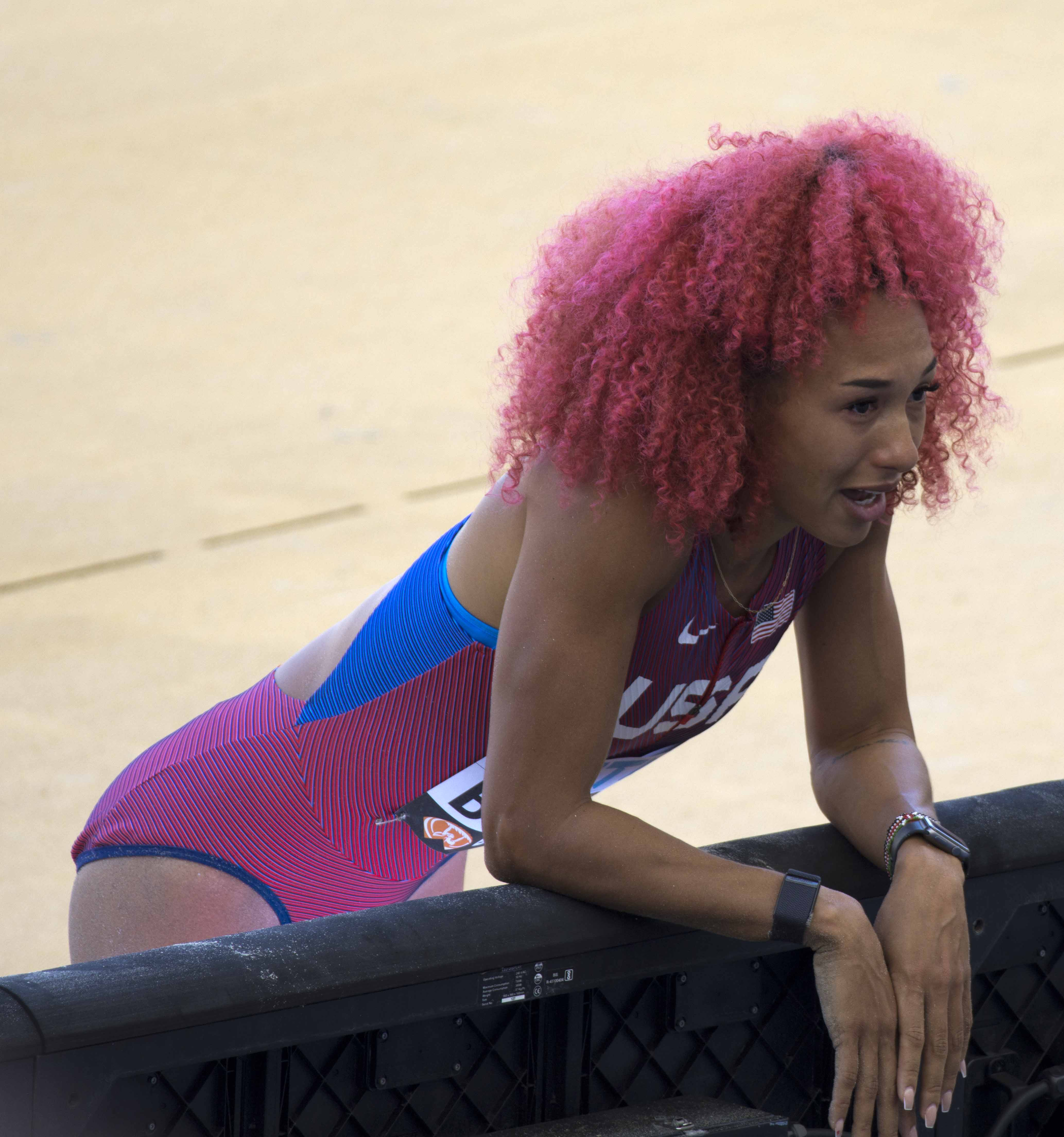
- Brooks in 2023

Personal information
- Nationality: United States
- Born: February 8, 1995 (age 31)
- Home town: Wichita Falls, Texas, U.S.
- Height: 5 ft 8 in (173 cm)

Sport
- Sport: Athletics
- Event: Heptathlon

Achievements and titles
- Personal best(s): Heptathlon: 6581 (Tokyo, 2025); Pentathlon: 4669 (Nanjing, 2025)
Medal record
Women's athletics
Representing United States
World Championships
| Bronze medal – third place | 2025 Tokyo | Heptathlon |
World Indoor Championships
| Bronze medal – third place | 2025 Nanjing | Pentathlon |

Taliyah Brooks (born February 8, 1995) is an American multi-event athlete. She won the bronze medal in heptathlon at the 2025 World Championships and the pentathlon bronze medal at the 2025 World Indoor Championships.

== Early life ==
Brooks attended S. H. Rider High School in Wichita Falls, Texas. She competed collegiately for the Arkansas Razorbacks. Having finished runner-up for the two previous years, in 2018 she won the pentathlon at the NCAA Division I championships.

== Career ==
Brooks competed in the heptathlon at the Olympic Track & Field team trials at Hayward Field in Eugene, Oregon, in June 2021. During the event the highest temperatures ever in Eugene, Oregon's history were recorded. Brooks collapsed during the event while second overall, and was hospitalized due to heat exhaustion. Brooks subsequently brought a lawsuit against the USATF.

In May 2023, Brooks set a then new personal best score of 6330 for the heptathlon in Desenzano del Garda, Italy. At the US national championships in July 2023 in Eugene, Oregon, Brooks finished second in the heptathlon behind Anna Hall. She was selected for the 2023 World Athletics Championships in Budapest in August 2023.

At the 2024 United States Olympic Track and Field Trials in Eugene, Oregon, Brooks finished third in the heptathlon with a career-best 6,408 points. She competed in the heptathlon at the 2024 Summer Olympics in Paris, finishing in eleventh place overall. She finished fourth overall in the 2024 World Athletics Combined Events Tour.

She was selected for the 2025 World Athletics Indoor Championships in Nanjing in March 2025, where she won the bronze medal in the pentathlon with a personal best score of 4669 points. She finished second at Décastar in July 2025 with 6365 points, her second-highest points tally. She was runner-up in the heptathlon at the 2025 USA Outdoor Track and Field Championships, finishing behind Anna Hall but scoring a personal best 6,526 points. In September 2025, she competed at the 2025 World Athletics Championships in Tokyo, Japan, winning a share of the bronze medal with British athlete Katarina Johnson-Thompson, with a personal best tally of 6581 points. Brooks was runner-up to Anna Hall in the season-long World Athletics Combined Events Tour for 2025.

Brooks was selected to represent the United States in the pentathlon at the 2026 World Athletics Indoor Championships in Toruń, Poland.

== International competition ==
Representing the United States
| Year | Competition | Venue | Position | Event | Notes |
|---|---|---|---|---|---|
| 2025 | World Indoor Championships | Nanjing, China | 3rd | Pentathlon | 4669 pts |
| 2025 | World Championships | Tokyo, Japan | 3rd | Heptathlon | 6581 pts |
