= Pippi Lotta Enok =

Estonian athletics competitor (born 2002)

Personal information
- Citizenship: Estonia
- Born: August 19, 2002 (age 24)

Achievements and titles
- Personal bests: Heptathlon: 6258 (2025); Pentathlon: 4593 (2025) NR
Medal record
Women's athletics
Representing Estonia
European U23 Championships
Bronze medal – third place	2023 Espoo	Heptathlon
World Athletics U20 Championships
Silver medal – second place	2021 Nairobi	Heptathlon

Pippi Lotta Enok (born 19 August 2002) is an Estonian multi-event athlete. A two-time national champion, she was a silver medalist at the 2021 World Athletics U20 Championships in the heptathlon. In 2025, she set a new Estonian national record in the Pentathlon. She won the heptathlon at the 2023 and 2025 NCAA Outdoor Championships.

== Career ==
She won the silver medal in the heptathlon at the 2021 World Athletics U20 Championships in Nairobi. She won the senior Estonian national heptathlon title in 2022.

She won the pentathlon at the 2023 Big 12 Indoor Track and Field Championships, competing for the University of Oklahoma. She won the heptathlon at the 2023 NCAA Division I Outdoor Track and Field Championships in June 2023 in Austin, Texas. Her score of 6,165 points for the outdoor heptathlon achieved at the Championships set a new programme record for Oklahoma. She was a bronze medalist in the heptathlon at the 2023 European Athletics U23 Championships in Espoo in July 2023. She won the Estonian national heptathlon title in 2024.

In February 2025, she broke the Estonian national record for the pentathlon when she scored 4,593 points in winning the Southeastern Conference (SEC) Track & Field Championships in Texas whilst competing the University of Oklahoma. It was a 182-point personal best and surpassed the previous Estonian record, held by Kaie Kand since 2009, by 13 points. In doing so, also became Oklahoma's first SEC champion in any sport. Her tally also placed her fifth on the NCAA all-time list, moved her to fourth in the world for the 2025 indoor season and set a new facility record and a new program record. The following month, she placed third in the pentathlon at the 2025 NCAA Division I Indoor Track and Field Championships in Virginia Beach on 15 March 2025, scoring 4,375 points.

She scored personal best of 6,258 points in the heptathlon at the 65th Mt. SAC Relays, California, in April 2025. In June 2025, she won the heptathlon at the 2025 NCAA Outdoor Championships in Eugene, Oregon. In September 2025, she completed the heptathlon at the 2025 World Championships in Tokyo, Japan, placing nineteenth.
