= Kym Carter =

American heptathlete

- Born: Lelia Kym Carter Begel; March 12, 1964 (age 61); Inglewood, California
- Occupation: Heptathlete

Lelia Kym Carter Begel (born March 12, 1964, in Inglewood, California), also known as Kym Carter, is a former heptathlete from the United States, representing her native country at the 1992 Summer Olympics in Barcelona, Spain. There she finished in eleventh place.

Carter is the Carl Lewis Foundation's executive director and a board member of Sound Body Sound Mind, a program to increase physical fitness in high schools. She is the mother of twins.

== Education ==
- Wichita High School East, class of 1982
- University of Houston
- Louisiana State University

== Corporate sponsors ==
- Nike, Inc.
- Reebok

== IAAF World Indoor Championships ==
- Silver medal in the pentathlon at the 1995 IAAF World Indoor Championships
- Bronze medal in the pentathlon at the 1997 IAAF World Indoor Championships

== Notable achievements ==
In 1993, she earned her first World Ranking (No. 8) in the heptathlon and ended the season ranked number 1. It was the first time since 1985 that another American outranked Jackie Joyner-Kersee in the multi except for 1989 when Joyner-Kersee didn't compete.

In 1982, while at Wichita East High School (the same high school as national record holder in the mile, Jim Ryun, she set the NFHS national high school record in the high jump at 6' 2 1/4". The record lasted for three years.
