= Anna Hall (heptathlete) =

American athlete (born 2001)

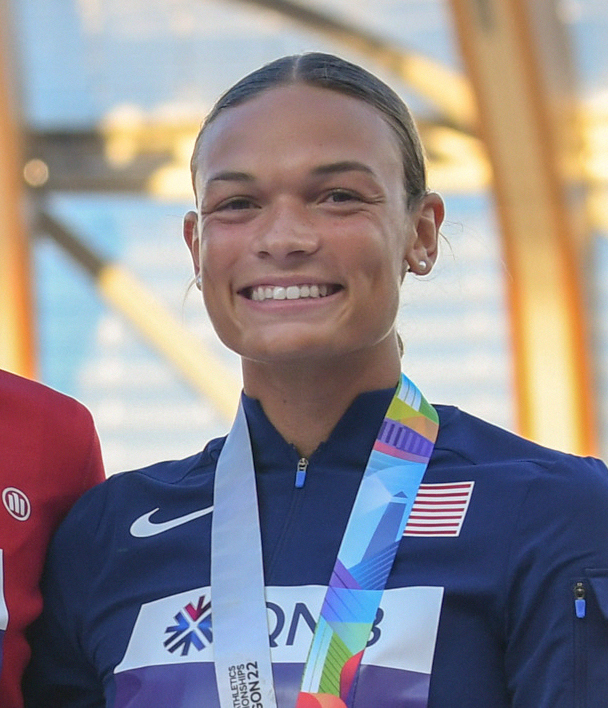
- Hall at the 2022 World Athletics Championships in Eugene

Personal information
- Born: Anna Marcia Jean Hall; March 23, 2001 (age 25) Denver, Colorado, U.S.
- Height: 5 ft 11 in (180 cm)

Sport
- Country: United States
- Sport: Track and field
- Events: Heptathlon, Pentathlon, 400 m, 400 m hurdles, 800 m, High Jump
- College team: Florida Gators (2021–2022); Georgia Bulldogs (2019–2021)
- Coached by: Mike Holloway, Mellanee Welty, Nic Peterson, Eric Werskey

Achievements and titles
- Highest world ranking: 1st (Heptathlon, 2023,2025,2026)
- Personal bests: Heptathlon: 7,032 (Götzis 2025); Pentathlon: 5,004 AR (Albuquerque 2023); High Jump: 1.95 m (6 ft 4 3/4 in) (Götzis 2025); 800 m: 2:01.23 (Götzis 2025); 400 m: 50.82 (Paris 2023); 400 mH: 54.42 (Florence 2023)
Medal record
Women's athletics
Representing the United States
World Championships
Gold medal – first place	2025 Tokyo	Heptathlon
Silver medal – second place	2023 Budapest	Heptathlon
Bronze medal – third place	2022 Eugene	Heptathlon
World Indoor Championships
Silver medal – second place	2026 Toruń	Pentathlon
Pan American U20 Championships
Gold medal – first place	2019 San José	Heptathlon

Anna Hall Slayton (born March 23, 2001) is an American athlete specializing in the combined events. She is the reigning World Champion in heptathlon, having won the title at the 2025 World Championships.

She won the silver medal in the heptathlon at the 2023 World Championships and the bronze medal at the 2022 World Championships. Hall is the North American indoor record holder for the pentathlon.

Her heptathlon and pentathlon best scores place her joint second and fourth on the respective world all-time lists. She is the only woman to break 6700 points in the heptathlon and run under 55 seconds in the 400 meters hurdles. Hall also has a 50.82 s personal best in the 400 meters. She is a three-time U.S. national champion and won two NCAA Division I titles representing the University of Florida.

== Early life and background ==
Anna Hall is the daughter of Ronette and David Hall. She has three sisters: older sisters Kathryn and Julia and younger sister Lauryn.

Anna Hall grew up in an athletic household in Highlands Ranch, Colorado, near Denver. Her father David was a three-sport letterman at the University of Michigan: a quarterback on the football team, a basketball player, and a competitor in the decathlon. Her older sisters Kathryn and Julia played tennis and ran track at Michigan respectively. Anna started track at seven by doing the high jump and then also running the 1500 meters.

Growing up in the mountains, she skied, played soccer, volleyball, lacrosse and field hockey, and swam for her neighborhood pool team in the summer.

== Early career ==
Hall started high school at Arapahoe but switched to Valor Christian for her second year. She was a three-time New Balance Nationals pentathlon champion between 2017 and 2019 and the 2018 New Balance Nationals high jump champion. In 2018, she set her first pentathlon (junior class) and heptathlon national high school records. The 17-year-old made her international debut at the World Under-20 Championships in Tampere, Finland that year, finishing ninth in the heptathlon against athletes up to two years her senior. The following year, she improved both her national high school records with 4302 and 5847 points at the USATF Indoor Championships (third place in senior division aged still 17) and Pan American U20 Championships (first place) respectively. She was also back-to-back heptathlon U20 national champion.

== College ==
=== 2019-2021: University of Georgia - All-American Honors and Injury ===
In 2019–2021, Hall represented the Georgia Bulldogs. She earned high jump and pentathlon All-America honors for the Indoor season that was cut short by the COVID-19 pandemic. In 2021, after finishing second in the NCAA indoor pentathlon and third in the high jump, she earned two First Team All-America honors to help the Bulldogs earn their NCAA Outdoor third-place team finish. She was named First-Team All-SEC for the Indoor season and Second-Team All-SEC for the Outdoor season. She skipped the heptathlon competition to focus on the delayed 2020 US Olympic trials.

During her 100 meters hurdles heat at the Olympic trials in June 2021, she hit the eighth barrier and crashed hard on the track, breaking the navicular bone in her left foot. She later posted, "my heart is broken that I didn’t get to put up the score I know I was ready for and my Olympic dreams (for this year) were shattered before my eyes". Hall had a surgery to insert a screw into the injured foot and wasn't cleared to walk until October. In the meantime, she transferred from the University of Georgia to the University of Florida. During her time at the University of Florida, she majored in finance (Bachelor of Business Administration) alongside her successful track career.

=== University of Florida (2021-2022): NCAA Indoor & Outdoor Individual Titles ===
In the fall of 2021, Hall transferred to Florida to compete under Mike Holloway. After overcoming the broken foot, she turned in a personal best of 4618 points in her second pentathlon competition in February, winning the SEC indoor title. She then claimed the pentathlon and heptathlon titles at the indoor and outdoor NCAA Division I Championships respectively. Indoors, Hall helped the Gators win their first women's NCAA Indoor team title in 30 years. Outdoors, she was also the 400 m hurdles silver medalist to help the Gator women earn their first ever NCAA Outdoor team title (running the 800 meters 20 minutes after her hurdles final). She earned Second Team All-SEC honors for her silver medal in the 400 m hurdles and First Team All-SEC for her gold medal finish in the pentathlon at the SEC Indoor Championships.

For her performance at Florida, Hall was named USTFCCCA Women's Outdoor National Field Athlete of the Year in 2022. She was received three First-Team All-America honors by the USTFCCCA for her performances in the pentathlon,400 m hurdles, and the heptathlon. Hall was also named a finalist for The Bowerman, the track and field award given to the best student-athlete. Hall, alongside her Florida teammate Jasmine Moore, were named finalists for the Honda Sports Award for Track & Field.

On the academic side, Hall was named on the 2022 SEC First-Year Academic Honor Roll, requiring her to have 3.0+ GPA while competing on the Indoor and Outdoor teams. She also named a 2022 USTFCCCA All-Academic Athlete, with a GPA higher than 3.25 and participated in the Championship.

She shattered her heptathlon personal best with a score of 6412 points at the Texas Relays, breaking the collegiate record of 6390 set by the world record-holder Jackie Joyner-Kersee in 1983 and setting an American record in the heptathlon 800 meters with a time of 2:04.61. Hall improved both marks to take the title at the USATF Combined Event Championships, with a total of 6458 points and the third-fastest heptathlon 800 m time in world history (2:03.11).

In July 2022, the 21-year-old bettered her heptathlon personal best by almost 300 points with a score of 6755 to claim the bronze medal at the home World Athletics Championships in Eugene, Oregon. After setting lifetime bests in three events, she became the third-best female heptathlete in American history and established a new NCAA record. It was the best US female heptathlon since 1993 and the first world medal in the discipline for the country for 20 years – since Shelia Burrell also earned bronze in 2001.

== Professional career ==
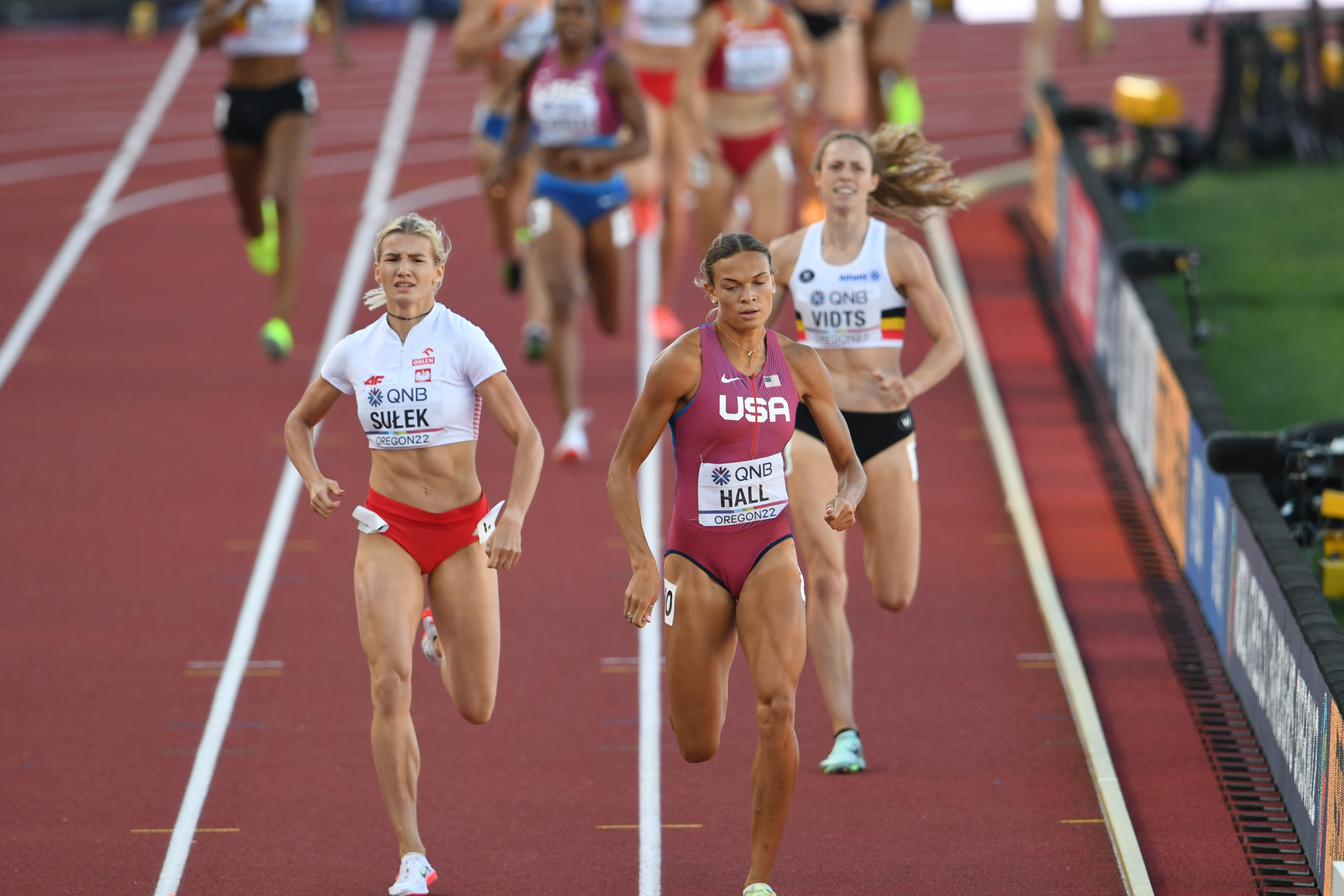
Hall won the 200 and 800 m (pictured at) runs at the 2022 World Athletics Championships in Eugene, Oregon.

In August 2022, Hall turned professional, signing a contract with Adidas.

=== 2023: North American pentathlon indoor record ===
On February 16, 2023, she obliterated Brianne Theisen-Eaton's North American pentathlon record with a total of 5004 points at the USATF Indoor Championships in Albuquerque, New Mexico. Becoming the third female in history to achieve 5000 points or more and moving up to second place on the world all-time list, Hall just missed the world record of 5013 pts, set by Nataliya Dobrynska in 2012. At the same meet, she later claimed the 400 meters title, running a new personal best time of 51.03 seconds.

On May 28, the 22-year-old improved her hepthatlon PB by 233 points by amassing a world-leading 6988 for a win at the prestigious Hypo-Meeting in Götzis, Austria to move to second / fifth on the NACAC area / world all-time list respectively. She set personal bests in five events, including a 100 m hurdles meet record of 12.75 s. Hall also turned in the second-best ever, behind only Jackie Joyner-Kersee, day-one score of 4172. She was selected for the 2023 World Athletics Championships in Budapest in August 2023.

=== 2024: Paris Olympics ===
Hall underwent knee surgery in January 2024. After breaking her foot mid-competition at the 2021 Olympic trials, Hall secured a spot at the 2024 Paris Olympics by winning the heptathlon at the US Olympic trials in June. She competed in the heptathlon at the 2024 Summer Olympics in Paris, finishing in fifth place overall.

=== 2025: World Champion ===
She was runner-up to Sydney McLaughlin-Levrone over 400 metres flat at the 2025 Grand Slam Track event in Miami in May 2025. Hall scored a personal best 7032 points to win the heptathlon at the Hypo-Meeting at Gotzis, Austria on 1 June 2025. This broke the meet record and tied with Carolina Kluft as second on the all-time list behind world record holder Jackie Joyner-Kersee. Hall set new personal bests in the high jump, shot put, javelin and 800 meters, with her 800 m time of 2:01.23, a new heptathlon world record for the distance.

She won the heptathlon at the 2025 USA Outdoor Track and Field Championships, becoming the first to win four consecutive titles.

At the 2025 World Athletics Championships, she became the second American woman to win the event after her mentor Jackie Joyner-Kersee won in 1992. She dominated with 6,888 points, the second-place finisher 174 points behind her, Kate O'Connor of Ireland. She had a personal best in the shot put and the 200 m, finishing in first place at the end of day one. She sealed her victory with a personal best in the javelin throw (48.13m) while also scoring in the top three in five of the seven events. She also won the season-long World Athletics Combined Events Tour for 2025.

=== 2026 ===
Hall won the pentathlon at the 2026 USATF Combined Events Championships on 22 February in Indianapolis, scoring 4831 points, the second highest point total in U.S. history, behind her own American record set in 2023. She scored 4860 points to win the silver medal behind Sofie Dokter in the pentathlon at the World Indoor Championships in Toruń, Poland, on 22 March 2026.

== Circuit performances ==
Grand Slam Track results
Slam	Race group	Event	Pl.	Time	Prize money
2025 Miami Slam	Long hurdles	400 m hurdles	3rd	54.43	US$30,000
2025 Miami Slam	Long hurdles	400 m	2nd	51.68	US$30,000

Wins and titles

- World Athletics Combined Events Tour
  - 2023: Götzis Hypo-Meeting
  - 2025: Götzis Hypo-Meeting

== International competitions ==
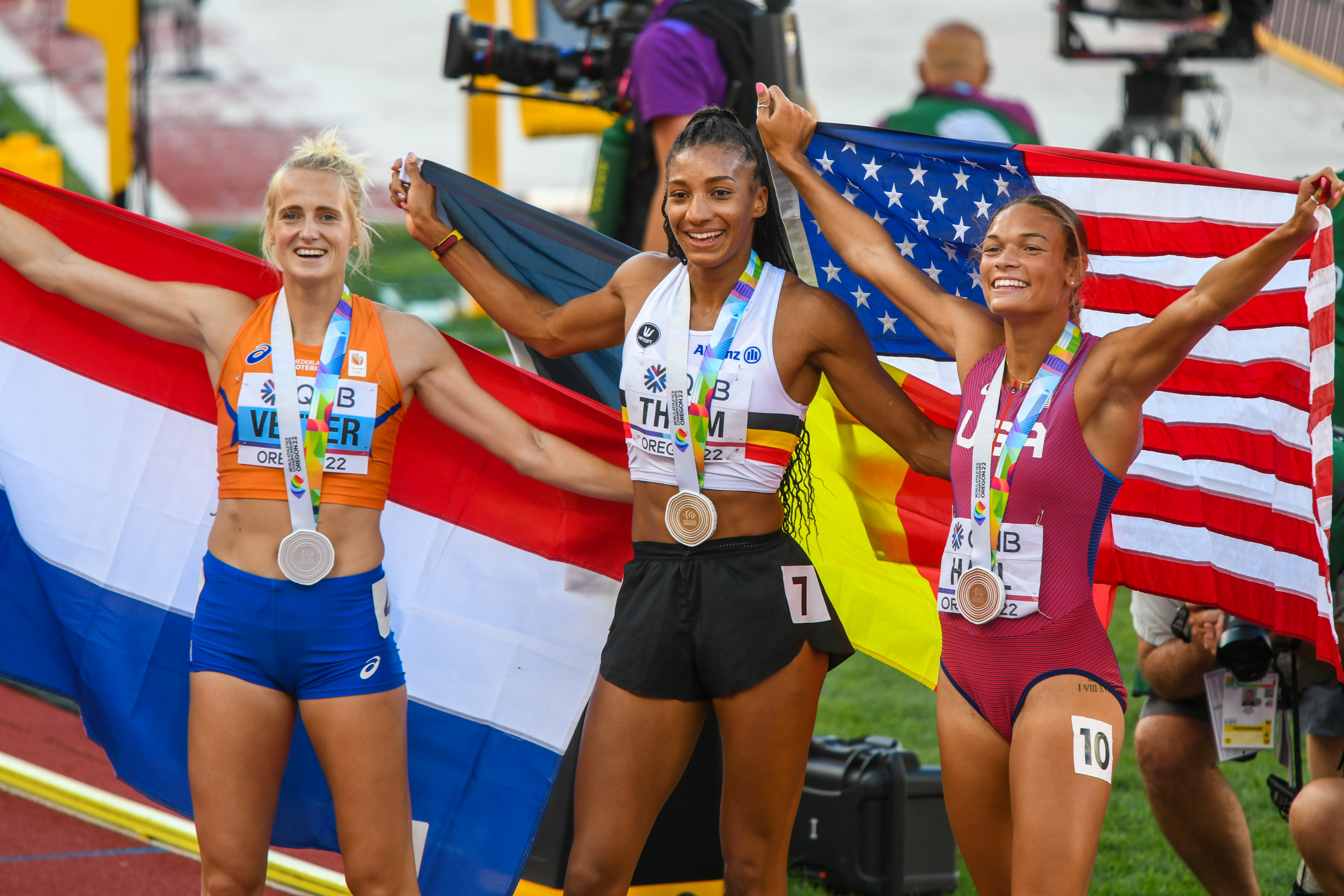
Hepthathlon medalists at Oregon 2022 (L–R): Anouk Vetter (6,867 points), Nafi Thiam (6,947 points) and Anna Hall (6,755 points).

Representing the United States
Year	Competition	Venue	Position	Event	Result
2018	World U20 Championships	Tampere	9th	Heptathlon	5655 pts
2019	Pan American U20 Championships	San José	1st	Heptathlon	5847 pts
2022	World Championships	Eugene	3rd	Heptathlon	6755 pts PB
2023	World Championships	Budapest	2nd	Heptathlon	6720 pts
2024	Olympic Games	Paris	5th	Heptathlon	6615
2025	World Championships	Tokyo	1st	Heptathlon	6888 pts PB
2026	World Indoor Championships	Toruń	2nd	Pentathlon	4860 pts

== National championships ==
Year	Competition	Venue	Position	Event	Result
Representing FK Elite Club / Valor Christian High School
2016	NSAF Nationals	North Carolina A&T State University	7th	Heptathlon	4517 pts
2017	Cuban Combined Events Championships	Havana, Cuba	1st	Heptathlon	4796 pts
2017	NSAF Nationals	North Carolina A&T State University	12th	High jump	1.70 m (5 ft 6 3/4 in)
2017	NSAF Nationals	North Carolina A&T State University	2nd	Heptathlon	4926 pts
2018	NSAF Indoor Nationals	Fort Washington Avenue Armory	1st	Pentathlon	4054 pts
2018	USATF U20 Championships	Indiana University	1st	Heptathlon	5660 pts
2019	USATF Indoor Championships	Staten Island, New York	3rd	Pentathlon	4302 pts
2019	NSAF Indoor Nationals	Fort Washington Avenue Armory	1st	Pentathlon	4209 pts
2019	USATF U20 Championships	Miramar, Florida	1st	Heptathlon	5646 pts
Representing Georgia Bulldogs
2020	NCAA Division I Indoor Championships	Albuquerque, New Mexico	All-American	Pentathlon	Cancelled by COVID-19
2021	NCAA Division I Indoor Championships	Fayetteville, Arkansas	3rd	High jump	1.87 m (6 ft 1 1/2 in)
2021	NCAA Division I Indoor Championships	Fayetteville, Arkansas	2nd	Pentathlon	4401 pts
2021	NCAA Division I Championships	University of Oregon	7th	High jump	1.81 m (5 ft 11 1/4 in)
2021	US Olympic Trials	University of Oregon	11th	High jump	1.77 m (5 ft 9 1/2 in)
2021	US Olympic Trials	University of Oregon	–	Heptathlon	DNF
Representing Florida Gators
2022	NCAA Division I Indoor Championships	Birmingham, Alabama	1st	Pentathlon	4586 pts
2022	USATF Combined Events Championships	University of Arkansas	1st	Heptathlon	6458 pts PB
2022	NCAA Division I Championships	University of Oregon	2nd	400 m hurdles	54.76
2022	NCAA Division I Championships	University of Oregon	1st	Heptathlon	6385 pts
2022	USATF Championships	University of Oregon	20th (h)	100 m hurdles	13.43
2022	USATF Championships	University of Oregon	8th	Long jump	6.42 m (21 ft 3/4 in) =PB
Representing Adidas
2023	USATF Indoor Championships	Albuquerque, New Mexico	1st	400 m	51.03 PB
2023	USATF Indoor Championships	Albuquerque, New Mexico	1st	Pentathlon	5004 pts AR
2023	USATF Outdoor Championships	University of Oregon	1st	Heptathlon	6677 pts
2024	US Olympic Trials	University of Oregon	1st	Heptathlon	6614 pts
2025	USATF Outdoor Championships	University of Oregon	1st	Heptathlon	6899 pts
2026	USATF Indoor Championships	Indianapolis, IN	1st	Pentathlon	4831 points

== Personal bests ==
Outdoor

Event	Performance	Location	Date	Score	Ref.
Heptathlon	—N/a	Götzis	May 31–June 1, 2025	7,032 points	—N/a
100 m hurdles	12.75 (+0.7 m/s)	Götzis	May 27, 2023	1,162 points	
High jump	1.95 m (6 ft 4 3/4 in)	Götzis	June 1, 2025	1,171 points	
Shot put	15.80 m (51 ft 10 in)	Tokyo	September 19, 2025	915 points	
200 meters	22.88 (+0.1 m/s)	Götzis	May 27, 2023	1,091 points	
Long jump	6.61 (+1.5 m/s)	Gainesville	April 14, 2023	1,043 points	
Javelin throw	48.13 m (157 ft 10 3/4 in)	Tokyo	September 20, 2025	824 points	
800 meters	2:01.23	Götzis	June 1, 2025	1,097 points	^{[a]}
Virtual Best Performance				7,303 points	—N/a

Event	Performance	Location	Date	Points	Ref.
Heptathlon NCAA	6,755 points	Eugene	July 18, 2022	6,755 points	CR (PS)
400 meters	50.82	Paris	June 9, 2023	—N/a	
400 m hurdles	54.42	Florence	June 2, 2023	—N/a	

^{a} Heptathlon best

Indoor

Event	Performance	Location	Date	Score
Pentathlon	—N/a	Albuquerque	February 16, 2023	5,004 points
60 m hurdles	8.04	Albuquerque	February 16, 2023	1,120 points
High jump	1.91 m (6 ft 3 in)	Albuquerque	February 16, 2023	1,119 points
Shot put	13.89 m (45 ft 6 3/4 in)	Indianapolis	February 22, 2026	787 points
Long jump	6.34 m (20 ft 9 1/2 in)	Albuquerque	February 16, 2023	956 points
800 meters	2:05.33	College Station	February 25, 2022	1,034 points
Virtual Best Performance				5,010 points

Event	Performance	Location	Date	Points
400 meters	51.03	Albuquerque	February 18, 2023	—N/a

== Personal life ==
Hall graduated from University of Florida with bachelor of arts degree in business administration in December 2023.

Hall has been in a relationship with New York Giants player Darius Slayton since November 2024, and they were engaged on November 15, 2025. Slayton and Hall got married at the Oheka Castle on Long Island, New York on April 11, 2026.
