= Kazakhstan at the 2025 World Athletics Championships =

- Flag of Kazakhstan
- WA code: KAZ

in Tokyo, Japan 13 September 2025 – 21 September 2025
- Competitors: 5 (0 men and 5 women)
- Medals: Gold 0 Silver 0 Bronze 0 Total 0

World Athletics Championships appearances
- 1993; 1995; 1997; 1999; 2001; 2003; 2005; 2007; 2009; 2011; 2013; 2015; 2017; 2019; 2022; 2023; 2025

Kazakhstan competed at the 2025 World Athletics Championships in Tokyo, Japan, from 13 to 21 September 2025.

== Results ==
Kazakhstan entered 5 athletes to the championships, all women.

Key

- Q = Qualified for the next round
- q = Qualified for the next round as a fastest loser or, in field events, by position without achieving the qualifying target
- NR = National record
- PB = Personal best
- SB = Season best
- N/A = Round not applicable for the event

=== Women ===
Track and road events

Athlete	Event	Heat		Semifinal		Final	
Athlete	Event	Result	Rank	Result	Rank	Result	Rank
Daisy Jepkemei	10,000 metres	—N/a				31:49.87	16
Daisy Jepkemei	3000 metres steeplechase	9:41.36	9	—N/a		Did not advance	
Norah Jeruto	3000 metres steeplechase	9:14.25	2 Q	—N/a		9:06.34	6
Yasmina Toxanbayeva	20 kilometres walk	—N/a				1:31:51	23
Polina Repina	35 kilometres walk	—N/a				3:20:00	35
Galina Yakusheva	35 kilometres walk	—N/a				DNF	
