= 2016 IAAF World U20 Championships – Women's 5000 metres =

The women's 5000 metres event at the 2016 IAAF World U20 Championships was held at Zdzisław Krzyszkowiak Stadium on 23 July.

== Medalists ==
Gold	Kalkidan Fentie; Ethiopia
Silver	Emmaculate Chepkirui; Kenya
Bronze	Bontu Rebitu; Bahrain

== Records ==
Standing records prior to the 2016 IAAF World U20 Championships in Athletics
World Junior Record	Tirunesh Dibaba (ETH)	14:30.88	Bergen, Norway	11 June 2004
Championship Record	Genzebe Dibaba (ETH)	15:08.06	Moncton, Canada	21 July 2010
World Junior Leading	Letesenbet Gidey (ETH)	14:45.63	Barcelona, Spain	30 June 2016

== Results ==
Rank	Name	Nationality	Time	Note
1st place, gold medalist(s)	Kalkidan Fentie	Ethiopia	15:29.64	PB
2nd place, silver medalist(s)	Emmaculate Chepkirui	Kenya	15:31.12	PB
3rd place, bronze medalist(s)	Bontu Rebitu	Bahrain	15:31.93	
4	Mercyline Chelangat	Uganda	15:34.09	PB
5	Yitayish Mekonene	Ethiopia	15:34.37	PB
6	Catherine Syokau Mwanzau	Kenya	15:37.79	PB
7	Dalila Abdulkadir Gosa	Bahrain	15:38.56	
8	Rika Kaseda	Japan	15:39.66	PB
9	Alina Reh	Germany	15:41.62	NU20R
10	Branna MacDougall	Canada	15:48.80	NU20R
11	Anna Rohrer	United States	15:49.42	
12	Mikuni Yada	Japan	15:49.63	
13	Salome Nyirarukundo	Rwanda	15:57.68	NU20R
14	Annabel McDermott	Australia	16:08.44	
15	Saida Meneses	Peru	16:36.04	NU20R
16	Bella Burda	United States	16:43.87	
17	Elsa Racasan	France	17:13.18	
18	Ciren Cuomu	China	17:24.32	
	Nebyat Abraham	Eritrea	DNS	
