= 2025 Asian Athletics Championships – Women's 10,000 metres =

Women's 10,000 metres at the 2025 Asian Athletics Championships
- Venue: Gumi Civic Stadium
- Location: Gumi, South Korea
- Dates: 29 May
- Competitors: 12 from 8 nations
- Winning time: 30:48.44

Medalists
gold medal	Daisy Jepkemei	Kazakhstan
silver medal	Ririka Hironaka	Japan
bronze medal	Mikuni Yada	Japan

The women's 10,000 metres event at the 2025 Asian Athletics Championships was held on 29 May.

== Records ==
Records before the 2025 Asian Athletics Championships
Record	Athlete (nation)	Time (s)	Location	Date
World record	Beatrice Chebet (KEN)	27:54.14	Eugene, United States	25 May 2024
Asian record	Wang Junxia (CHN)	29:31.78	Beijing, China	8 September 1993
Championship record	Shitaye Eshete (BHR)	31:15.62	Doha, Qatar	23 April 2019
World leading	Elise Cranny (USA)	30:36.56	San Juan Capistrano, United States	28 March 2025
Asian leading	Ririka Hironaka (JPN)	31:13.78	Kumamoto, Japan	12 April 2025

== Schedule ==
The event schedule, in local time (UTC+9), was as follows:

Date	Time	Round
29 May	10:15	Final

== Results ==
Place	Athlete	Nation	Time	Notes
1st place, gold medalist(s)	Daisy Jepkemei	Kazakhstan	30:48.44	
2nd place, silver medalist(s)	Ririka Hironaka	Japan	30:56.32	
3rd place, bronze medalist(s)	Mikuni Yada	Japan	31:12.21	SB
4	He Wuga	China	31:36.18	SB
5	Sanjivani Jadhav	India	33:08.17	
6	Seema	India	33:08.23	PB
7	W.A.M.Rasara Wijesuriya	Sri Lanka	33:21.62	PB
8	Odekta Elvina Naibaho	Indonesia	33:32.77	
9	Ma Xiuzhen	China	33:42.03	
10	Kim Do-yeon	South Korea	34:12.70	
11	Choi Jung-yoon	South Korea	34:34.93	SB
—	Violah Jepchumba	Bahrain	DNF	
