= Kazakhstan at the 2022 World Athletics Championships =

- Flag of Kazakhstan
- WA code: KAZ
- National federation: Athletics Federation of the Republic of Kazakhstan
- Website: qazathletics.kz/en/

in Eugene, United States 15–24 July 2022
- Competitors: 12 (2 men and 10 women) in 13 events
- Medals Ranked 22nd: Gold 1 Silver 0 Bronze 0 Total 1

World Athletics Championships appearances
- 1993; 1995; 1997; 1999; 2001; 2003; 2005; 2007; 2009; 2011; 2013; 2015; 2017; 2019; 2022; 2023

Kazakhstan competed at the 2022 World Athletics Championships in Eugene, Oregon from 15 to 24 July 2022. Kazakhstan had entered 12 athletes.

== Medalists ==
Medal	Athlete	Event	Date
Gold	Norah Jeruto	Women's 3000 metres steeplechase	20 July

== Results ==
Key

- Q = Qualified for the next round
- q = Not qualified for the next round as a fastest loser or, in field events, by position without achieving the qualifying target
- NR = National record
- PB = Personal best
- SB = Season best
- N/A = Round not applicable for the event

=== Men ===
Track and road events

Athlete	Event	Heat		Semi-final		Final	
Athlete	Event	Result	Rank	Result	Rank	Result	Rank
Mikhail Litvin	400 metres	46.00 SB	22 q	45.63 PB	16	Did not advance	
Georgiy Sheiko	20 kilometres walk	—				1:26:40	28
Georgiy Sheiko	35 kilometres walk	—				2:39:47	35

=== Women ===
Track and road events

Athlete	Event	Heat		Semi-final		Final	
Athlete	Event	Result	Rank	Result	Rank	Result	Rank
Olga Safronova	100 metres	11.65	41	Did not advance			
Olga Safronova	200 metres	23.50	37	Did not advance			
Caroline Chepkoech Kipkirui	5000 metres	14:52.54 SB	2 Q	—		14:54.80	7
Caroline Chepkoech Kipkirui	10,000 metres	—				30:17.64 NR	7
Zhanna Mamazhanova	Marathon	—				2:31:15	21
Norah Jeruto	3000 metres steeplechase	9:01.54	1 Q	—		8:53.02 CR, NR	1st place, gold medalist(s)
Daisy Jepkemei	3000 metres steeplechase	9:23.07	19	—		Did not advance	
Galina Yakusheva	20 kilometres walk	—				1:38:47	33
Galina Yakusheva	35 kilometres walk	—				2:54:50 PB	17
Polina Repina	35 kilometres walk	—				DQ	

Field events

Athlete	Event	Qualification		Final	
Athlete	Event	Distance	Position	Distance	Position
Nadezhda Dubovitskaya	High jump	1.93	8 q	1.96	8
Kristina Ovchinnikova	High jump	1.86	20	Did not advance	
Mariya Yefremova	Triple jump	13.27	28	Did not advance	
