= Alice Aprot Nawowuna =

Kenyan long-distance runner (born 1994)

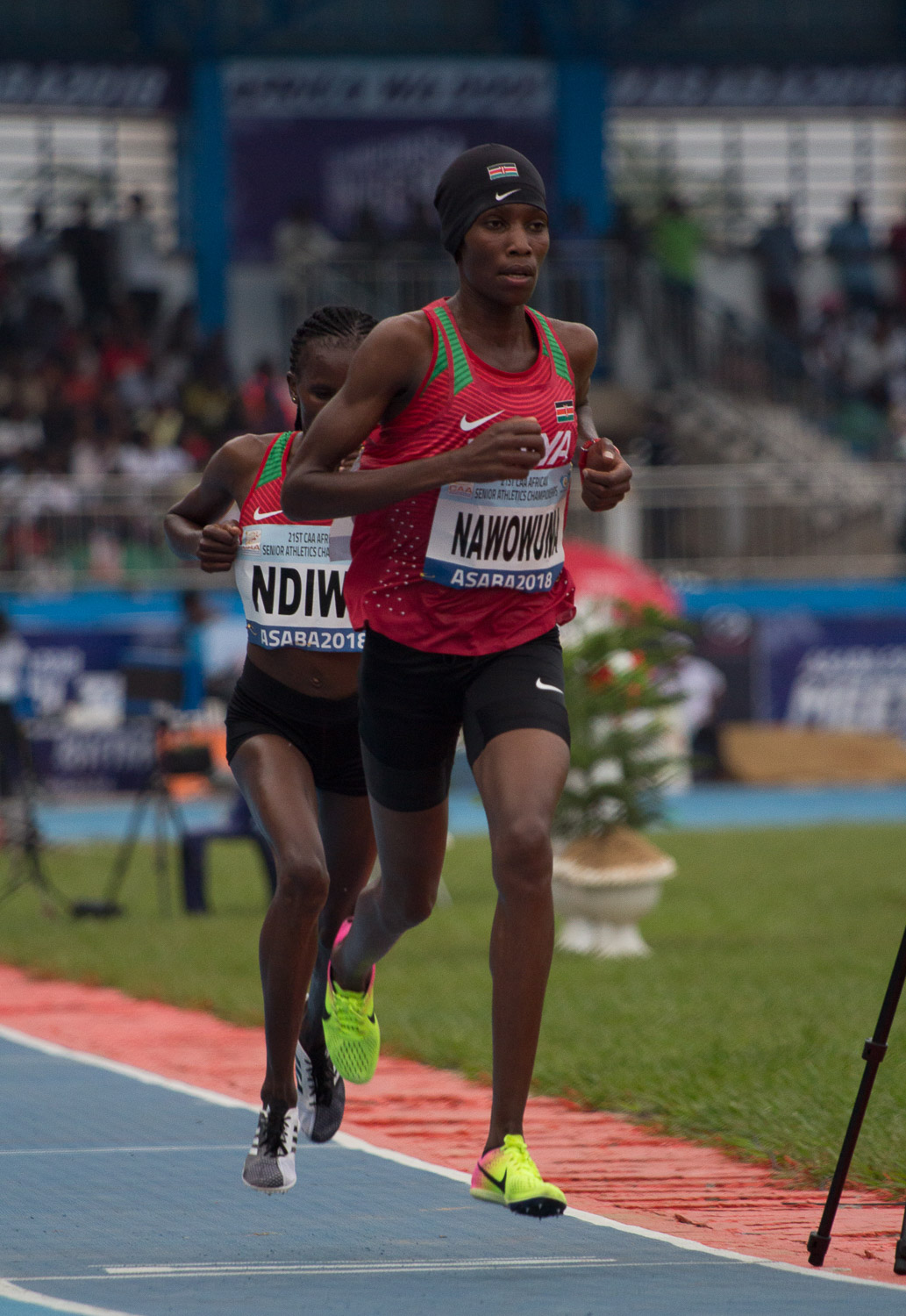
- Aprot at the 2018 African Championships in Athletics

Personal information
- Nationality: Kenyan
- Born: 2 January 1994 (age 32)
- Height: 1.52 m (5 ft 0 in)
- Weight: 54 kg (119 lb)

Sport
- Country: Kenya
- Sport: Athletics
- Event: Long-distance running
Medal record
Women's athletics
Representing Kenya
African Games
Gold medal – first place	2015 Brazzaville	10,000 m
Bronze medal – third place	2015 Brazzaville	5000 m
African Championships
Gold medal – first place	2016 Durban	10,000 m
Silver medal – second place	2018 Asaba	10,000 m
World Junior Championships
Bronze medal – third place	2010 Moncton	5000 m
World Cross Country Championships
Gold medal – first place	2017 Kampala	Team
Silver medal – second place	2017 Kampala	Senior race
African Cross Country Championships
Gold medal – first place	2014 Kampala	Team
Gold medal – first place	2016 Yaoundé	Senior race
Gold medal – first place	2016 Yaoundé	Team
Bronze medal – third place	2014 Kampala	Senior race

Alice Aprot Nawowuna (born 2 January 1994) is a Kenyan long-distance runner. She was the gold medallist in the 10,000 metres at the 2015 African Games, where she also won the bronze medal in the 5000 metres. Aprot claimed gold and silver in the 10,000 m at the 2016 and 2018 African Championships in Athletics respectively. She earned the silver medal for the senior women's race at the 2017 World Cross Country Championships.

At age 16, she won bronze in the 5000 m at the 2010 World Junior Championships. She is the sister of former world champion Joseph Ebuya.

In March 2023, Aprot was banned from competition for four years by the Anti-Doping Agency of Kenya (ADAK) after metabolite of letrozole (bis-4-cyanophenyl-methanol) had been found in drug test in May 2022. The start of her ban has been backdated to 14 July 2022, when she had been provisionally suspended.

== Career ==
Aprot emerged on the Kenyan cross country running circuit as a teenager. She made her international debut at the age of sixteen, coming ninth in the junior race of the 2010 IAAF World Cross Country Championships. Among a strong 5000 metres field at the 2010 World Junior Championships in Athletics, she took the bronze medal behind future world medallists Genzebe Dibaba and Mercy Cherono. The event marked a change for Aprot, who wore spikes rather than going barefoot as she previously had, but she managed a personal best of 15:17.39 minutes. She made her debut on the IAAF Diamond League series that year, coming fifth at the DN Galan.

Aprot was less successful in the 2011 season, managing only fifth in the junior race at the 2011 African Cross Country Championships. She missed the remainder of the season and only returned to regular competition in 2014, the same year she entered the senior ranks. Her first senior medal came at the 2014 African Cross Country Championships, where she was an individual bronze medallist and a team gold medallist.

In 2015, Aprot placed fifth at the Kenyan World Championships trials event, but this earned her selection for both the 5000 m and 10,000 metres events at the African Games. She excelled at that event, setting an African Games record of 31:24.18, beating compatriot Gladys Chesire. Aprot was also a 5000 m bronze medallist, completing a Kenyan podium sweep with Margaret Chelimo and Rosemary Wanjiru.

She began the 2016 season with wins at the Campaccio and Antrim International Cross Country meetings. At the 2016 Rio Olympics, Aprot came in fourth place in the women's 10,000 m. She was responsible for the extremely fast pace that helped Almaz Ayana break the world record, and Aprot set a personal best time of 29:53.51 which marked her as the fifth fastest woman of all time in the event behind the three athletes who beat her in the Olympic final and Wang Junxia of China.

At the 2017 IAAF World Cross Country Championships in Kampala, Uganda, Aprot came second to her fellow Kenyan, Irene Chepet Cheptai. Both won the team gold as Kenya secured positions 1–6 in the senior women's race. Also in 2017 she competed in the 10,000 m at the 2017 World Championships held in London, placing fourth with a time of 31:11.86. Her 29:53.51 achieved at the 2016 Olympic Games, where she also finished fourth, would have secured her the world title in London in 2017.

== Achievements ==
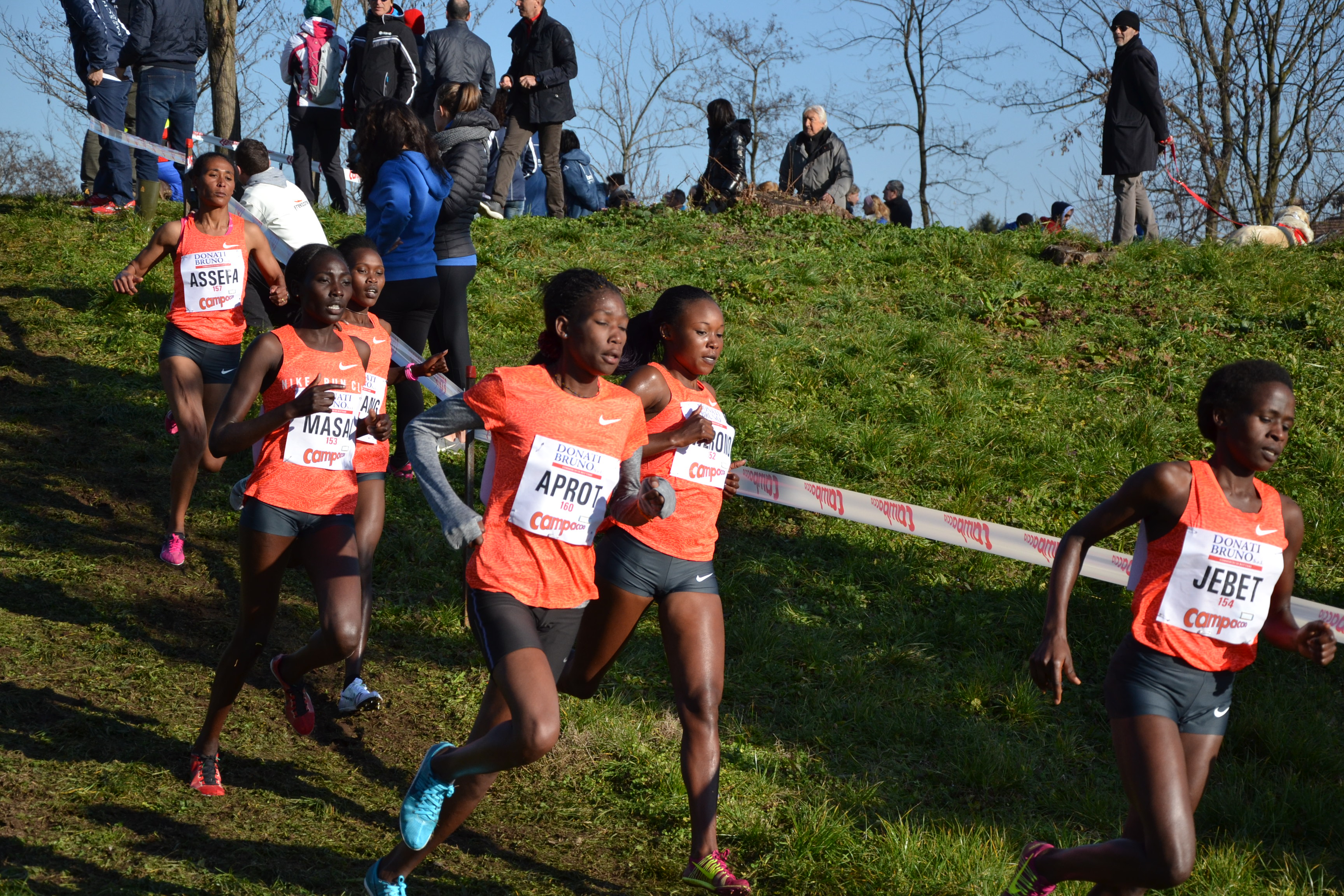
Aprot (3rd from the right) en route to her victory at the 2016 Campaccio

=== International competitions ===
Representing Kenya
Year	Competition	Venue	Position	Event	Result
2010	World Cross Country Championships	Bydgoszcz, Poland	9th	Junior race	19:14
2010	World Junior Championships	Moncton, Canada	3rd	5000 m	15:17.39
2011	African Cross Country Championships	Cape Town, South Africa	5th	Junior race	20:12
2014	African Cross Country Championships	Kampala, Uganda	3rd	Senior race	25:46.48
2014	African Cross Country Championships	Kampala, Uganda	1st	Team	10 pts
2015	African Games	Brazzaville, Congo Republic	3rd	5000 m	15:31.82
2015	African Games	Brazzaville, Congo Republic	1st	10,000 m	31:24.18 GR
2016	African Cross Country Championships	Yaoundé, Cameroon	1st	Senior race	29:52
2016	African Cross Country Championships	Yaoundé, Cameroon	1st	Team	11 pts
2016	African Championships	Durban, South Africa	1st	10,000 m	30:26.94
2016	Olympic Games	Rio de Janeiro, Brazil	4th	10,000 m	29:53.51
2017	World Cross Country Championships	Kampala, Uganda	2nd	Senior race	32:02
2017	World Cross Country Championships	Kampala, Uganda	1st	Team	10 pts
2017	World Championships	London, United Kingdom	4th	10,000 m	31:11.86
2018	African Championships	Asaba, Nigeria	2nd	10,000 m	31:36.12

=== Personal bests ===
- 5000 metres – 14:39.56 (Brussels 2016)
- 10,000 metres – 29:53.51 (Rio de Janeiro 2016)

Road

- 10 kilometres – 31:02 (Berlin 2015)
- 10 miles – 51:59 (Amsterdam 2016)

=== Circuit wins and National titles ===
- Cross country wins
  - Tuskys Wareng Cross Country: 2014, 2015
  - Antrim International Cross Country: 2016
  - Campaccio: 2016
- Kenyan Athletics Championships
  - 10,000 metres: 2016, 2017

== See also ==
- List of African Games medalists in athletics (women)
