= Athletics at the 2022 Asian Games – Women's 10,000 metres =

Women's 10,000 metres at the 2022 Asian Games
- Venue: Hangzhou Olympic Expo Main Stadium
- Date: 29 September 2023
- Competitors: 8 from 7 nations

Medalists
| gold medal | Violah Jepchumba | Bahrain |
| silver medal | Ririka Hironaka | Japan |
| bronze medal | Caroline Chepkoech Kipkirui | Kazakhstan |

The women's 10,000 metres competition at the 2022 Asian Games took place on 29 September 2023 at the HOC Stadium, Hangzhou.

== Schedule ==
All times are China Standard Time (UTC+08:00)

| Date | Time | Event |
|---|---|---|
| Friday, 29 September 2023 | 20:05 | Final |

== Records ==
Prior to this competition, the existing world, Asian and Games records were as follows.

| World Record | Letesenbet Gidey (ETH) | 29:01.03 | Hengelo, Netherlands | 8 June 2021 |
| Asian Record | Wang Junxia (CHN) | 29:31.78 | Beijing, China | 8 September 1993 |
| Games Record | Sun Yingjie (CHN) | 30:28.26 | Busan, South Korea | 8 October 2002 |

== Results ==
Legend

- DNF — Did not finish

| Rank | Athlete | Time | Notes |
|---|---|---|---|
| 1st place, gold medalist(s) | Violah Jepchumba (BRN) | 31:43.73 | |
| 2nd place, silver medalist(s) | Ririka Hironaka (JPN) | 31:50.74 | |
| 3rd place, bronze medalist(s) | Caroline Chepkoech Kipkirui (KAZ) | 33:15.83 | |
| 4 | Li Yaxuan (CHN) | 33:42.25 | |
| 5 | Mariia Korobitskaia (KGZ) | 35:03.83 | |
| 6 | Santoshi Shrestha (NEP) | 38:40.15 | |
| 7 | Farhat Bano (PAK) | 44:32.40 | |
| — | Bontu Rebitu (BRN) | DNF | |
