= 2025 World Athletics Championships – Women's 10,000 metres =

Women's 10,000 metres at the 2025 World Athletics Championships
- Venue: National Stadium
- Location: Tokyo, Japan
- Dates: 13 September
- Competitors: 27 from 14 nations
- Winning time: 30:37.61

Medalists
gold medal	Beatrice Chebet	Kenya
silver medal	Nadia Battocletti	Italy
bronze medal	Gudaf Tsegay	Ethiopia

The women's 10,000 metres at the 2025 World Athletics Championships was held at the National Stadium in Tokyo on 13 September 2025.

== Summary ==
Gudaf Tsegay returned as the defending champion after leading a dramatic Ethiopian sweep when Sifan Hassan blew up on the home stretch. There was to be no Hassan factor in this Championships because she chose to focus her efforts winning the Sydney Marathon a couple of weeks earlier but after setting the world record last year, Beatrice Chebet's strength and speed might be more foreboding. Chebet didn't have a fast 10,000 on her record for 2025 but became the first woman to break 14 minutes in the 5000. The world leader was Janeth Chepngetich. 2023 bronze medalist Ejgayehu Taye returned, and Nadia Battocletti took silver at the Olympics behind Chebet after Hassan got stuck in traffic.

This was a championship race in the Tokyo heat and humidity, not a world record attempt, so they wouldn't be crushing it. Ririka Hironaka was given some camera time in front of the home crowd for the first eight laps with the major contenders watching from the front of the pack. Then Agnes Ngetich went to the front, dropping the pace from 74 second laps to 71's. The field strung out. In the next 3 laps the pack went from 24 to 7. Chebet even came to the front to push the 14th lap in 68. It was down to Ngetich, Chebet, Taye, Tsegay and Battocletti. Looing around the 16th lap slowed to a 73 anticipating the work to come. Then they went back to 68, Taye cranked the 18th lap in 66 but backed off. They settled for a few 69s, with the 22nd lap slowing to 77 as the competitors were sizing each other up. Three laps to go and no breakaway seemed to be handing the race to Chebet. With a kilometer to go, Tsegay came from the back of the group to push the pace, Taye couldn't hang on but the other three did. Tsegay pushed the next two laps, checking back but seeing she had achieved no separation. As soon as they crossed the 200 metre start line, Chebet took off. Only Battocletti went with her. Battocletti kept the gap to a metre through the turn, but then it became two and three. Chebet made it five by the finish line. Tsegay held on for bronze.

== Records ==
Before the competition records were as follows:

Record	Athlete & Nat.	Perf.	Location	Date
World record	Beatrice Chebet (KEN)	28:54.14	Eugene, United States	25 May 2024
Championship record	Berhane Adere (ETH)	30:04.18	Saint-Denis, France	23 August 2003
World Leading	Janeth Chepngetich (KEN)	30:27.02	Nairobi, Kenya	22 July 2025
African Record	Beatrice Chebet (KEN)	28:54.14	Eugene, United States	25 May 2024
Asian Record	Wang Junxia (CHN)	29:31.78	Beijing, China	8 September 1993
European Record	Sifan Hassan (NED)	29:06.82	Hengelo, Netherlands	6 June 2021
North, Central American and Caribbean record	Alicia Monson (USA)	30:03.82	San Juan Capistrano, United States	4 March 2023
Oceanian record	Rose Davies (AUS)	30:34.11	Oslo, Norway	11 June 2025
South American Record	Florencia Borelli (ARG)	31:33.07	San Juan Capistrano, United States	16 March 2024

== Qualification standard ==
The standard to qualify automatically for entry was 30:20.00.

== Schedule ==
The event schedule, in local time (UTC+9), was as follows:

Date	Time	Round
13 September	21:30	Final

== Final ==
The final started on 13 September at 21:31.

Rank	Name	Nationality	Time	Notes
1st place, gold medalist(s)	Beatrice Chebet	Kenya	30:37.61	
2nd place, silver medalist(s)	Nadia Battocletti	Italy	30:38.23	NR
3rd place, bronze medalist(s)	Gudaf Tsegay	Ethiopia	30:39.65	SB
4	Agnes Jebet Ngetich	Kenya	30:42.66	
5	Ejgayehu Taye	Ethiopia	30:55.52	SB
6	Ririka Hironaka	Japan	31:09.62	
7	Joy Cheptoyek	Uganda	31:15.03	
8	Fotyen Tesfay	Ethiopia	31:21.67	SB
9	Lauren Ryan	Australia	31:27.78	
10	Megan Keith	Great Britain & N.I.	31:33.85	
11	Calli Thackery	Great Britain & N.I.	31:37.81	
12	Elise Cranny	United States	31:40.07	
13	Jana van Lent	Belgium	31:44.05	
14	Emily Infeld	United States	31:47.65	
15	Klara Lukan	Slovenia	31:49.76	
16	Daisy Jepkemei	Kazakhstan	31:49.87	
17	Isobel Batt-Doyle	Australia	31:53.41	
18	Taylor Roe	United States	32:12.19	
19	Elisa Palmero	Italy	32:12.72	
20	Mikuni Yada	Japan	32:28.94	
21	Tsigie Gebreselama	Ethiopia	32:33.73	SB
22	Francine Niyomukunzi	Burundi	32:52.59	
23	Eva Dieterich	Germany	33:46.76	
24	Núbia Silva	Brazil	36:00.21	
—	Rebecca Chelangat	Uganda	DNF	
—	Sarah Chelangat	Uganda	DNF	
—	Janeth Chepngetich	Kenya	DNF	
