= Kazakhstan at the 2023 World Athletics Championships =

- Flag of Kazakhstan
- WA code: KAZ

in Budapest, Hungary 19 August 2023 – 27 August 2023
- Competitors: 8 (1 man and 7 women)
- Medals: Gold 0 Silver 0 Bronze 0 Total 0

World Athletics Championships appearances
- 1993; 1995; 1997; 1999; 2001; 2003; 2005; 2007; 2009; 2011; 2013; 2015; 2017; 2019; 2022; 2023; 2025

Kazakhstan competed at the 2023 World Athletics Championships in Budapest, Hungary, from 19 to 27 August 2023.

== Results ==
Kazakhstan entered 8 athletes.

Key

- Q = Qualified for the next round
- q = Qualified for the next round as a fastest loser or, in field events, by position without achieving the qualifying target
- NR = National record
- PB = Personal best
- SB = Season best
- N/A = Round not applicable for the event

=== Men ===
Track and road events

Athlete	Event	Heat		Semifinal		Final	
Athlete	Event	Result	Rank	Result	Rank	Result	Rank
David Yefremov	110 metres hurdles	13.78	8	Did not advance			

=== Women ===
Track and road events

Athlete	Event	Heat		Final	
Athlete	Event	Result	Rank	Result	Rank
Caroline Chepkoech Kipkirui	10,000 metres	—N/a		DNF	
Daisy Jepkemei	3000 metres steeplechase	9:46.23 SB	12	Did not advance	
Zhanna Mamazhanova	Marathon	—N/a		DNF	
Galina Yakusheva	35 kilometres walk	—N/a		DNF	

Field events

Athlete	Event	Qualification		Final	
Athlete	Event	Distance	Position	Distance	Position
Nadezhda Dubovitskaya	High jump	1.89	11 q	1.90	=9
Yelizaveta Matveyeva	High jump	1.80	=29	Did not advance	
Kristina Ovchinnikova	High jump	1.85	=25	Did not advance	
