= Kazakhstan at the 2017 World Championships in Athletics =

- WA code: KAZ

in London
- Competitors: 13 in 6 events
- Medals Ranked =37th: Gold 0 Silver 0 Bronze 1 Total 1

World Championships in Athletics appearances
- 1993; 1995; 1997; 1999; 2001; 2003; 2005; 2007; 2009; 2011; 2013; 2015; 2017; 2019; 2022; 2023; 2025

Kazakhstan competed at the 2017 World Championships in Athletics in London, United Kingdom, from 4–13 August 2017.

== Medallists ==
Medal	Athlete	Event	Date
Bronze	Olga Rypakova	Women's triple jump	August 7

== Results ==
(q – qualified, NM – no mark, SB – season best)

=== Men ===
Track and road events

Athlete	Event	Final	
Athlete	Event	Result	Rank
Georgiy Sheiko	20 kilometres walk	1:23:11	36

=== Women ===
Track and road events

Athlete	Event	Heat		Semifinal		Final	
Athlete	Event	Result	Rank	Result	Rank	Result	Rank
Viktoriya Zyabkina	200 metres	23.66	32	Did not advance			
Yelena Nanaziashvili	Marathon	—				2:58:32	73
Rima Kashafutdinova; Viktoriya Zyabkina; Svetlana Golendova; Olga Safronova	4 × 100 metres relay	45.27	13	—		Did not advance	
Diana Aydosova	20 kilometres walk	—				1:38:16 SB	47
Polina Repina	20 kilometres walk	—				1:39:56	50
Regina Rykova	20 kilometres walk	—				1:41:59	52

Field events

Athlete	Event	Qualification		Final	
Athlete	Event	Distance	Position	Distance	Position
Mariya Ovchinnikova	Triple jump	13.18	26	Did not advance	
Olga Rypakova	Triple jump	14.57	1 Q	14.77	3rd place, bronze medalist(s)
