= Athletics at the 2022 Asian Games – Women's 5000 metres =

Women's 5000 metres at the 2022 Asian Games
- Venue: Hangzhou Olympic Expo Main Stadium
- Date: 3 October 2023
- Competitors: 13 from 7 nations

Medalists
gold medal	Parul Chaudhary	India
silver medal	Ririka Hironaka	Japan
bronze medal	Caroline Chepkoech Kipkirui	Kazakhstan

The women's 5000 metres competition at the 2022 Asian Games took place on 3 October 2023 at the HOC Stadium, Hangzhou.

== Schedule ==
All times are China Standard Time (UTC+08:00)

Date	Time	Event
Tuesday, 3 October 2023	19:50	Final

== Records ==
Prior to this competition, the existing world, Asian and Games records were as follows.

World Record	Gudaf Tsegay (ETH)	14:00.21	Eugene, United States	17 September 2023
Asian Record	Jiang Bo (CHN)	14:28.09	Shanghai, China	23 October 1997
Games Record	Sun Yingjie (CHN)	14:40.41	Busan, South Korea	12 October 2002

== Results ==
Legend

- DNF — Did not finish

Rank	Athlete	Time	Notes
1st place, gold medalist(s)	Parul Chaudhary (IND)	15:14.75	
2nd place, silver medalist(s)	Ririka Hironaka (JPN)	15:15.34	
3rd place, bronze medalist(s)	Caroline Chepkoech Kipkirui (KAZ)	15:23.12	
4	Yuma Yamamoto (JPN)	15:30.08	
5	Ankita Dhyani (IND)	15:33.03	
6	Tigest Getent (BRN)	15:36.58	
7	Bontu Rebitu (BRN)	15:49.05	
8	Daisy Jepkemei (KAZ)	15:54.98	
9	Kim Yu-jin (KOR)	15:55.89	
10	Ainuska Kalil Kyzy (KGZ)	16:37.42	
11	Gulshanoi Satarova (KGZ)	16:39.93	
12	Rajpura Pachhai (NEP)	17:05.34	
—	Santoshi Shrestha (NEP)	DNF	
