= Kazakhstan at the 2013 World Championships in Athletics =

- WA code: KAZ

in Moscow
- Competitors: 17
- Medals: Gold 0 Silver 0 Bronze 0 Total 0

World Championships in Athletics appearances
- 1993; 1995; 1997; 1999; 2001; 2003; 2005; 2007; 2009; 2011; 2013; 2015; 2017; 2019; 2022; 2023; 2025

Kazakhstan competed at the 2013 World Championships in Athletics in Moscow, Russia, from 10–18 August 2013. A team of 17 athletes was announced to represent the country in the event.

== Results ==
(q – qualified, NM – no mark, SB – season best)

=== Men ===
Track and road events

Athlete	Event	Preliminaries		Heats		Semifinals		Final	
Athlete	Event	Time	Rank	Time	Rank	Time	Rank	Time	Rank
Mihail Krassilov	Marathon								
Vitaliy Anichkin	20 kilometres walk							1:30,02	45
Georgiy Sheiko	20 kilometres walk							1:27,41	36

Field events

Athlete	Event	Preliminaries		Final	
Athlete	Event	Width Height	Rank	Width Height	Rank
Konstantin Safronov	Long jump	7,47	26	-	-
Roman Valiyev	Triple jump	16,43	17	-	-
Nikita Filippov	Pole vault	5,40	14-18	-	-

Decathlon

Dmitriy Karpov	Decathlon			
Dmitriy Karpov	Event	Results	Points	Rank
	100 m	11.37	780	30
	Long jump	6.59	718	33
	Shot put	15,39	814	2
	High jump	DNS		
	400 m			
	110 m hurdles			
	Discus throw			
	Pole vault			
	Javelin throw			
	1500 m			
Total	DNF			

=== Women ===
Track and road events

Athlete	Event	Preliminaries		Heats		Semifinals		Final	
Athlete	Event	Time	Rank	Time	Rank	Time	Rank	Time	Rank
Olga Bludova	200 metres			23,83	36	-	-	-	-
Viktoriya Zyabkina	200 metres			24,47	45	-	-	-	-
Margarita Mukasheva	800 metres			2:02,06	26	-	-	-	-
Anastasiya Soprunova	100 metres hurdles			13,85	35	-	-	-	-
Galina Kichigina	20 kilometres walk							1:34,18	38
Ayman Kozhakhmetova	20 kilometres walk							1:33,00	27
Sholpan Kozhakhmetova	20 kilometres walk							1:38,09	55

Field events

Athlete	Event	Preliminaries		Final	
Athlete	Event	Width Height	Rank	Width Height	Rank
Irina Ektova	Triple jump	13,37	18	-	-
Marina Aitova	High jump	1,83	25	-	-

Heptathlon

Irina Karpova	Heptathlon			
Irina Karpova	Event	Results	Points	Rank
	100 m hurdles	14.54	903	32
	High jump	1.65	795	33
	Shot put	11.92	656	28
	200 m	26.60	754	32
	Long jump	5.54	712	32
	Javelin throw	DNS		
	800 m			
Total	DNF			
