= Track and field at the 2011 Military World Games – Women's 10,000 metres =

The women's 5000 metres event at the 2011 Military World Games was held on 20 July at the Estádio Olímpico João Havelange.

== Records ==
Prior to this competition, the existing world and CISM record were as follows:

World Record	Junxia Wang (CHN)	29:31.78	Beijing, China	8 September 1993
CISM World Record	Doris Changewo (KEN)	32:32.44	Hyderabad, India	October 2007

== Schedule ==
Date	Time	Round
20 July 2011	16:30	Final

== Medalists ==
Gold	Silver	Bronze
Doris Changeywo; Kenya	Lineth Chepkurui; Kenya	Kareema Saleh Jasim; Bahrain

== Results ==
=== Final ===
Rank	Name	Nationality	Time	Notes
1st place, gold medalist(s)	Doris Changeywo	Kenya	33:38.93	
2nd place, silver medalist(s)	Lineth Chepkurui	Kenya	33:39.13	
3rd place, bronze medalist(s)	Kareema Saleh Jasim	Bahrain	33:45.34	
4	Claudette Mukasakindi	Rwanda	34:40.81	
5	Chuan Luo	China	35:09.21	
6	Kelly Calway	United States	35:32.63	
7	Amira Ben Amor	Tunisia	35:51.21	
8	Gladys Kibiwot	Bahrain	36:55.56	
9	Ilsida Toemere	Suriname	41:11.21	
	Salima Elouali Alami	Morocco	DNF	
	Mihaela Botezan	Romania	DNF	
	Rasa Drazdauskaitė	Lithuania	DNS	
	Zhor El Kamch	Morocco	DNS	
