= Kazakhstan at the 2015 World Championships in Athletics =

- WA code: KAZ

in Beijing
- Competitors: 12
- Medals Ranked 32nd: Gold 0 Silver 0 Bronze 1 Total 1

World Championships in Athletics appearances
- 1993; 1995; 1997; 1999; 2001; 2003; 2005; 2007; 2009; 2011; 2013; 2015; 2017; 2019; 2022; 2023; 2025

Kazakhstan competed at the 2015 World Championships in Athletics in Beijing, China, from 22 to 30 August 2015.

On 24 August Olga Rypakova won the bronze medal in the women's triple jump.

== Medalists ==
The following Kazakhstani competitors won medals at the Championships

Medal	Athlete	Event	Date
Bronze	Olga Rypakova	Triple jump	24 August

== Results ==
(q – qualified, NM – no mark, SB – season best)

=== Men ===
Track and road events

Athlete	Event	Heat		Semifinal		Final	
Athlete	Event	Result	Rank	Result	Rank	Result	Rank
Mihail Krassilov	Marathon	—N/a				DNF	
Georgiy Sheiko	20 kilometres walk	—N/a				1:24:58	30

Field events

Athlete	Event	Qualification		Final	
Athlete	Event	Result	Rank	Result	Rank
Nikita Filippov	Pole vault	5.40	30	Did not advance	
Roman Valiyev	Triple jump	16.04	25	Did not advance	

=== Women ===
Track and road events

Athlete	Event	Heat		Semifinal		Final	
Athlete	Event	Result	Rank	Result	Rank	Result	Rank
Viktoriya Zyabkina	100 metres	11.24	3 Q	11.19 PB	6	Did not advance	
Olga Safronova	100 metres	11.49	5	Did not advance			
Viktoriya Zyabkina	200 metres	22.92	3 Q	22.77 NR	5	Did not advance	
Olga Safronova	200 metres	23.28 SB	5	Did not advance			
Irina Smolnikova	Marathon	—N/a				DNF	
Gulzhanat Zhanatbek	Marathon	—N/a				2:45:54	40

Field events

Athlete	Event	Qualification		Final	
Athlete	Event	Result	Rank	Result	Rank
Olga Rypakova	Triple jump	14.33	4 Q	14.77 SB	3rd place, bronze medalist(s)
Irina Ektova	Triple jump	13.61	17	Did not advance	
