= 2023 Asian Athletics Championships – Women's 10,000 metres =

Women's 10,000 metres at the 2023 Asian Athletics Championships
- Venue: National Stadium
- Location: Bangkok, Thailand
- Dates: 13 July
- Competitors: 12 from 10 nations
- Winning time: 32:59.36

Medalists
gold medal	Haruka Kokai	Japan
silver medal	Momoka Kawaguchi	Japan
bronze medal	Bayartsogtyn Mönkhzayaa	Mongolia

The women's 10,000 metres event at the 2023 Asian Athletics Championships was held on 13 July.

== Records ==
Records before the 2023 Asian Athletics Championships
Record	Athlete (nation)	Time (s)	Location	Date
World record	Letesenbet Gidey (ETH)	29:01.03	Hengelo, Netherlands	8 June 2021
Asian record	Wang Junxia (CHN)	29:31.78	Beijing, China	8 September 1993
Championship record	Shitaye Eshete (BHR)	31:15.62	Doha, Qatar	23 April 2019
World leading	Gudaf Tsegay (ETH)	29:29.73	Nerja, Spain	23 June 2023
Asian leading	He Wuga (CHN)	31:14.94	Walnut, United States	6 May 2023

== Results ==
Rank	Name	Nationality	Time	Notes
1st place, gold medalist(s)	Haruka Kokai	Japan	32:59.36	
2nd place, silver medalist(s)	Momoka Kawaguchi	Japan	33:18.72	
3rd place, bronze medalist(s)	Bayartsogtyn Mönkhzayaa	Mongolia	33:24.79	NR
4	Sanjivani Jadhav	India	34:04.47	
5	Odekta Elvina Naibaho	Indonesia	34:59.19	PB
6	Phạm Thị Hồng Lệ	Vietnam	35:38.19	
7	Vut Tsz Ying	Hong Kong	38:08.37	
8	Linda Janthachit	Thailand	38:22.25	PB
9	Pareeya Sonsem	Thailand	39:52.36	
	Caroline Kipkirui	Kazakhstan	DNF	
	Alia Saeed Mohammed	United Arab Emirates	DNS	
	Ma Xuizhen	China	DNS	
