= Athletics at the 2026 Asian Games – Women's marathon =

Women's marathon at the 2026 Asian Games
- Venue: Mizuho Park Athletic Stadium, Nagoya
- Date: 26 September 2026
- Competitors: 18 from 11 nations
- Winning time: 2:27:31

Medalists
gold medal	Shitaye Habte	Bahrain
silver medal	Ciren Cuomu	China
bronze medal	Mikuni Yada	Japan

The women's marathon competition at the 2026 Asian Games took place on 26 September 2026 at the Mizuho Park Athletic Stadium in Nagoya, Japan. Shitaye Habte of Bahrain won the gold medal, Ciren Cuomu of China won the silver, and Mikuni Yada of Japan won the bronze.

== Schedule ==
All times are Japan Standard Time (UTC+09:00)

Schedule
Date	Time	Event
26 September 2026	07:50	Final

== Records ==
Prior to this competition, the existing world, Asian and Games records were as follows.

World Record	Tigst Assefa (ETH)	2:15:41	London, United Kingdom	25 April 2026
Asian Record	Honami Maeda (JPN)	2:18:59	Osaka, Japan	27 January 2024
Games Record	Naoko Takahashi (JPN)	2:21:47	Bangkok, Thailand	5 December 1998

== Results ==
Place	Athlete	Nation	Time	Notes
1st place, gold medalist(s)	Shitaye Eshete	Bahrain	2:27:31	
2nd place, silver medalist(s)	Ciren Cuomu	China	2:27:43	SB
3rd place, bronze medalist(s)	Mikuni Yada	Japan	2:27:56	
4	Sayaka Sato	Japan	2:28:14	
5	Rose Sitienei	Bahrain	2:29:51	
6	Sol Gyong-pak	North Korea	2:30:41	SB
7	Su Gyong-jong	North Korea	2:31:48	SB
8	Wu Bing	China	2:32:09	SB
9	Odekta Elvina Naibaho	Indonesia	2:35:24	
10	Galbadrakhyn Khishigsaikhan	Mongolia	2:35:45	
11	Ying Chu lo	Hong Kong	2:40:46	SB
12	Choi Kyung-sun	South Korea	2:41:31	
13	Cheuk Ning Wong	Hong Kong	2:42:33	
14	Artjoy Torregosa	Philippines	2:48:36	
15	Lodkeo Inthakoumman	Laos	2:50:03	
16	Lim Ye-jin	South Korea	2:58:16	
17	Sreyroth Khan	Cambodia	3:02:49	
—	Bayartsogtyn Mönkhzayaa	Mongolia	DNF	
