= 2016 African Championships in Athletics – Women's 10,000 metres =

The women's 10,000 metres event at the 2016 African Championships in Athletics was held on 25 June in Kings Park Stadium.

== Results ==
Rank	Athlete	Nationality	Time	Notes
1st place, gold medalist(s)	Alice Aprot	Kenya	30:26.94	CR, WL
2nd place, silver medalist(s)	Jackline Chepngeno	Kenya	31:27.73	
3rd place, bronze medalist(s)	Joyciline Jepkosgei	Kenya	31:28.28	
4	Salome Nyirarukundo	Rwanda	31:45.82	
5	Shure Demise	Ethiopia	32:14.25	
6	Yenenesh Tilahun	Ethiopia	32:17.38	
7	Clementine Mukandanga	Rwanda	33:28.64	
8	Ayantu Idossa	Ethiopia	34:34.64	
9	Lemlem Teweldebrhan	Eritrea	34:41.77	
10	Ruth Kibreab	Eritrea	36:10.58	
11	Glenrose Xaba	South Africa	36:32.37	
12	Falicia Oyo	South Sudan	37:55.31	
	Rachael Zena Chebet	Uganda	DNF	
	Keneilwe Sesing	South Africa	DNF	
	Nebyat Abraham	Eritrea	DNS	
	Sali Nguisse	Sudan	DNS	
