= 2016 Athletics Kenya Olympic Trials =

The 2016 Athletics Kenya Olympic Trials the athletics meeting held by Athletics Kenya to select the representatives to the 2016 Olympics in Rio de Janeiro, Brazil. The meet was held June 29-30, 2016 in Kipchoge Keino Stadium in Eldoret, Kenya. Eldoret is at high altitude in athletics terms.

== Men's results ==
Key: ≠ Not yet selected in respective event because the athlete has not achieved the required qualifying standard. However, athletes can still pursue standards following this meet and still make the team provided they attain it before the July 11 cutoff date.

=== Track ===
Event	Gold		Silver		Bronze	
200 meters NWI	Mike Mokamba	20.48	Carvin Nkanata	20.82	Mwai Peter	20.90≠
400 meters	Alphas Kishoyian	44.96	Raymond Kibet	45.60≠	Stanley Kieti	45.98≠
800 meters	Ferguson Rotich	1:43.60	David Rudisha	1:43.89	Alfred Kipketer	1:44.07
1500 meters	Asbel Kiprop	3:38.21	Elijah Manangoi	3:38.48	Ronald Kwemoi	3:38.80
5000 meters	Caleb Ndiku	13:37.2h	Isiah Koech	13:37.6h	Cyrus Rutto	13:39.1h
10,000 meters	Paul Kipngetich Tanui	27:46.15	Charles Muneria Yosei	27:57.07	Wilfred Kimitei	28:12.22
400 m hurdles	Nicholas Bett	48.29	Boniface Mucheru	49.24	Haron Koech	49.50
3000 m s'chase	Brimin Kipruto	8:27.68	Conseslus Kipruto	8:27.86	Ezekiel Kemboi	8:27.95

=== Field ===
Event	Gold		Silver		Bronze	
Javelin throw	Julius Yego	81.04	Alex Kiprotich	74.51≠	Nelson Yegon	71.20≠

== Women's results ==
Key: ≠ Not yet selected in respective event because the athlete has not achieved the required qualifying standard. However, athletes can still pursue standards following this meet and still make the team provided they attain it before the July 11 cutoff date.

=== Track ===
Event	Gold		Silver		Bronze	
200 meters NWI	Eunice Kadogo	23.70≠	Millicent Ndoro	23.92≠	Mary Tanui	24.81≠
400 meters	Jacinter Shikanda	53.37	Maureen Jelagat	52.45	Sharon Muli	54.34≠
800 meters	Margaret Nyairera Wambui	1:58.27	Eunice Sum	1:59.63	Winny Chebet	2:00.63
1500 meters	Faith Chepngetich Kipyegon	4:06.71	Nancy Chepkwemoi	4:10.00	Viola Cheptoo Lagat	4:11.93
5000 meters	Vivian Cheruiyot	15:01.60	Hellen Onsando Obiri	15:13.45	Mercy Cherono	15:25.51
10,000 meters	Vivian Cheruiyot	31:36.37	Betsy Saina	32:04.83	Gladys Chesire	32:17.35≠
400 m hurdles	Maureen Jelagat	57.35≠	Jane Chege	59.75≠	Florence Wasike	1:00.88≠
3000 m s'chase	Hyvin Kiyeng	9:28.33	Beatrice Chepkoech	9:41.87	Lydia Rotich	9:48.47
