= Mikuni Yada =

Japanese long-distance runner

Personal information
- Born: 29 October 1999 (age 26)

Sport
- Country: Japan
- Sport: Track and field
- Event: Long-distance
Medal record
Women's athletics
Representing Japan
Asian Championships
Bronze medal – third place	2025 Gumi	10,000 m
Asian Junior Championships
Gold medal – first place	2018 Gifu	5000 m
Asian Games
Bronze medal – third place	2026 Aichi–Nagoya	Marathon

Mikuni Yada (born 29 October 1999) is a Japanese long-distance runner. She was a bronze medalist at the 2025 Asian Athletics Championships over 10,000 metres. She is from 2022 the Asian indoor record holder over 5000 metres.

== Career ==
She won the gold medal over 5000 metres at the 2018 Asian Junior Athletics Championships in Gifu, Japan, running 16:32.65.

She is since 27 February 2022 the Asian indoor record holder over 5000 metres with a time of 15:23.87 she set in the United States at the Boston University Last Chance Invitational meeting.

She was runner-up to Ririka Hironaka at the Japanese 10,000 m Championships in Kumamoto, on 12 April 2025, in a time of 31:20.09. She won the bronze medal in the 10,000 metres at the 2025 Asian Athletics Championships in Gumi, South Korea, in 31:12.21, finishing behind Kazakh Daisy Jepkemei and her compatriot Ririka Hironaka.

In September 2025, she competed over 10,000 metres at the 2025 World Championships in Tokyo, Japan.
