= Anna Rohrer =

American long-distance runner

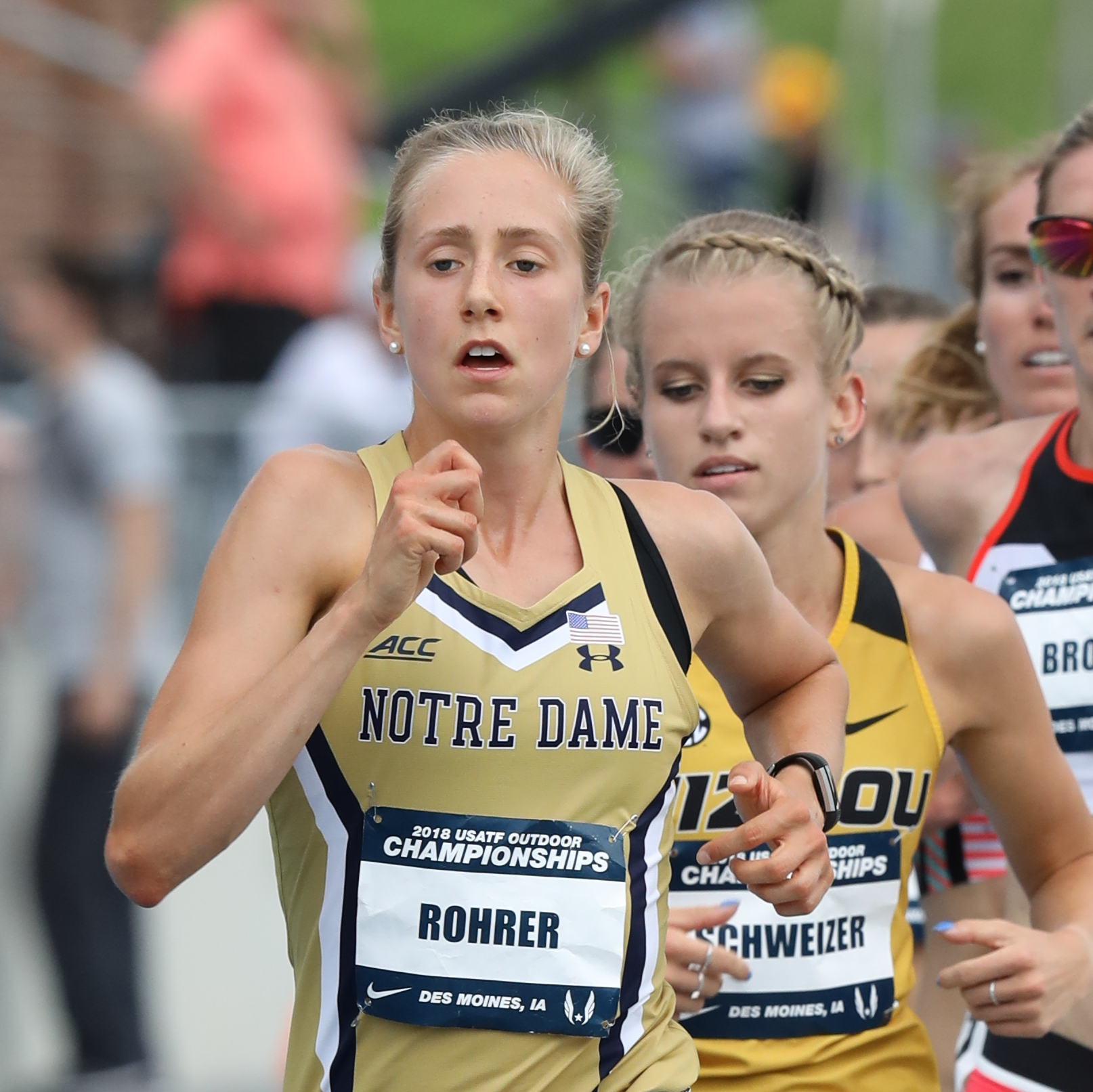
- Rohrer in 2018

Personal information
- Nationality: American
- Born: February 24, 1997 (age 29) Mishawaka, Indiana, U.S.
- Height: 5 ft 7 in (1.70 m)

Sport
- Sport: Track and field, Cross country running
- Events: 10,000 metres 1500 metres 5000 metres
- College team: Notre Dame Fighting Irish

Achievements and titles
Personal best
10,000 metres	31:58.99 (2017)
1500 metres	4:27.79 (2017)
3000 metres	9:11.14 (2017)
5000 metres	15:29.83 (2015)
Medal record
Women's athletics
Representing the United States
World U20 Championships
	2016 Junior Championships	5000m
Great Edinburgh International Cross Country
Gold medal – first place	2015 Great Edinburgh Junior	Team USA
Silver medal – second place	2015 Great Edinburgh Junior	4 km

Anna Rohrer (born February 24, 1997) is an American long-distance runner and former student-athlete at the University of Notre Dame. She won four high school national championships and was named the Foot Locker female cross country athlete of the year in 2015.

== High school ==
Rohrer attended Mishawaka High School, in Mishawaka, Indiana, where she was a star track and cross country athlete.

Rohrer won the 2012 5,000 m Foot Locker Cross Country Championships, in a time of 17:25 and the 2014 event in 17:13.

Rohrer received her 2014–15 Cross Country Gatorade Player of the Year awards from the University of Notre Dame alumnus and USA Track & Field national champion, Molly Huddle.

Rohrer won the 2014 NBNO 5000 title in a time of 16:10 at New Balance Outdoor Nationals.

Rohrer also won her fourth national title at the 2014 New Balance Indoor Nationals, setting an indoor record of 16:10.79 in the girls 5,000 meter race.

Rohrer ran 17:08.8 to win the 2014 IHSAA State Cross Country Championship, 17:13.2 to win the 2012 IHSAA State Cross Country Championship. In the 2015 IHSAA State Track and Field Championship, she ran 4:52.09 to win the 1600m title, and 10:11.20 to win the 3200m title at the. She ran 10:14.43 to win the 3200m title at the 2014 IHSAA State Track and Field Championship, ran 10:20.68 to win the 3200m title at the 2013 IHSAA State Track and Field Championship, and as a freshman, ran 11:11.04 to place 17th in the 3200m at the 2012 IHSAA State Track and Field Championship.

Mishawaka Mayor Dave Wood presented Rohrer with a key to the city, proclaiming December 8, 2012, Anna Rohrer National Champion Day.

== NCAA ==
Rohrer attended the University of Notre Dame.

In 2017, Rohrer won ACC Outdoor Championship titles at 5,000 and 10,000 meters.

On June 7, 2018, Rohrer finished sixth in the NCAA Division I Outdoors 10,000 meters, although her time was under the existing 30-year-old event record.

Rohrer placed 10th in 2018 NCAA Division I Cross Country Championships leading the Notre Dame Fighting Irish women's cross country to an 8th-place team finish.

On June 6, 2019, Rohrer repeated her 6th-place finish in the 10,000 meters at 2019 NCAA Division I Outdoor Track and Field Championships.

As of June 2019, Rohrer is a 5-time Atlantic Coast Conference champion, 8-time USTFCCCA NCAA Division I First and Second Team All-American.

School Year	Atlantic Coast Conference Cross Country Championship	NCAA Division I Cross Country Championship	Atlantic Coast Conference Indoor track and field Championship	NCAA Division I Indoor track and field Championship	Atlantic Coast Conference Outdoor Track and Field Championship	NCAA Division I Outdoor Track and Field Championship
2018-19 R-Junior	3rd, 20:19.2	10th, 20:02.4			10,000 m 1st, 33:30.73	10,000 m 6th, 33:25.91
2017-18 Junior					10,000 m 2nd, 33:03.30	10,000 m 6th, 32:26.24
2016-17 Sophomore	1st, 19:26.4	3rd, 19:44.6	5000 m 1st, 15:38.11	5000 3rd, 15:29.83	5000 m 1st, 16:00.95	10,000 m 16th, 33:56.64
2016-17 Sophomore	1st, 19:26.4	3rd, 19:44.6	3000 m, 3rd, 9:22.09	5000 3rd, 15:29.83	10,000 m 1st, 33:22.05	10,000 m 16th, 33:56.64
2015-16 Freshman	2nd, 20:08.3	6th, 19:59.7	3000 m 2nd, 9:11.14	5000 m 4th, 15:54.53		
2015-16 Freshman	2nd, 20:08.3	6th, 19:59.7	5000 m 2nd, 15:32.03	5000 m 4th, 15:54.53		

== Open competition ==
Year	US National and World Championship	Event	Venue	Place	Time
2018	2018 USA Outdoor Track and Field Championships	5000 m	Drake Stadium (Drake University), Des Moines, Iowa	10th place	15:59.58
2016	2016 IAAF World U20 Championships – Women's 5000 metres	5000 m	Bydgoszcz, Poland	11th place	15:49.42
2016	US U20 Outdoor Track and Field Championships	5000 m	Clovis, California	2nd place	15:57.92
2015	Great Edinburgh International Cross Country	4000 m	Edinburgh, Scotland	2nd place	14:47
2015	Great Edinburgh International Cross Country	4000 m	Edinburgh, Scotland	Team USA, 1st place	16 points

In April 2017, she ran a world-leading 31:58.99 to win the 10,000m at the Stanford Invitational, earning USA Track & Field Athlete of the Week honors.

== Postcollegiate competition ==
=== Half Marathons and Marathons ===
Competition	Rank	Time	Location	Date	Notes
2022 Carmel Half Marathon	2nd	1:13:48	Carmel, Indiana, USA	2022 Apr 9	
2022 Green Bay Marathon	2nd	2:36:31	Green Bay, Wisconsin, USA	2022 May 15	
2023 Boston Marathon	22nd	2:30:52	Boston, USA	2023 Apr 17	Finished as 7th American women
2023 500 Festival Mini-Marathon	1st	1:11:31	Indianapolis, Indiana, USA	2023 May 6	
2024 500 Festival Mini-Marathon	1st	1:15:16	Indianapolis, Indiana, USA	2024 May 4	Won the race while 23 weeks pregnant
