= Gladys Chesir Kiptagelai =

Kenyan long-distance runner (born 1993)

Medal record

Women's athletics

Representing Kenya

African Games
Silver medal – second place	2015 Brazzaville	10,000 m

Gladys Chesir Kiptagelai (born 20 February 1993) is a Kenyan long-distance runner who competes over distances from 3000 metres up to the marathon. She was a gold medallist at the Youth Olympics and a silver medallist at the African Games in 2015.

== Career ==
Chesir won her first international medal at the 2010 Summer Youth Olympics, where she topped the podium in the 3000 m. This was Kenya's first ever medal at the new competition. She began to make her mark as a senior around late 2014 in road running events, having top three finishes at the Zevenheuvelenloop, Egmond Half Marathon and World 10K Bangalore. She set a personal best in the half marathon in Yangzhou, running a time of 1:09:17. After a third-place finish at the Kenyan Athletics Championships, she was chosen for the 10,000 metres at the 2015 African Games and ultaimtely won a silver medal on her senior international debut, behind compatriot Alice Aprot Nawowuna. Her ability was further proved with a win at the Grand 10 Berlin, where she moved up to ninth on the all-time 10K run lists with a time of 30:41.

Chesir continued to improve with a time of 68:36 for third at the Delhi Half Marathon, then 66:57 for fifth at the RAK Half Marathon. This led to her selection for the 2016 IAAF World Half Marathon Championships, where she was sixth in a time of 68:46, but outside of the team rankings behind compatriots Peres Jechirchir, Cynthia Jerotich, and Mary Wacera Ngugi, who swept the top three positions. She placed third in the 10,000m at the 2016 Athletics Kenya Olympic Trials, but did not get added to the Kenyan team as she had not achieved the required qualification time. She continued on the roads, with top five finishes in Delhi, Copenhagen, and Prague before winning the Lille Half Marathon with her second fastest ever time at that point with 67:49.

Chesir had her marathon debut in October 2017, and gave a strong performance with 2:24:51 for the runner-up spot at the top level marathon behind Ethiopian Tadelech Bekele.

== International competitions ==
Year	Competition	Venue	Position	Event	Notes
2010	Youth Olympic Games	Bishan, Singapore	1st	3000 m	9:13.58
2015	African Games	Brazzaville, Republic of the Congo	2nd	10,000 m	31:36.87
2016	World Half Marathon Championships	Cardiff, United Kingdom	6th	Half marathon	1:08:46

== Personal bests ==
- 1500 metres – 4:28.1 (2014)
- 3000 metres – 8:52.63 (2014)
- 5000 metres – 15:19.93 (2014)
- 10,000 metres – 31:36.87 (2015)
- 10K run – 30:41 (2015)
- Half marathon – 66:57 (2016)
- Marathon – 2:24:51 (2017)

== See also ==
- List of 2010 Summer Youth Olympics medal winners
