= 2019 Asian Athletics Championships – Women's 5000 metres =

Women's 5000 metres at the 2019 Asian Athletics Championships
- Venue: Khalifa International Stadium
- Location: Doha, Qatar
- Dates: 21 April
- Competitors: 11 from 7 nations
- Winning time: 15:28.87

Medalists
gold medal	Winfred Mutile Yavi	Bahrain
silver medal	Bontu Rebitu	Bahrain
bronze medal	Parul Chaudhary	India

The women's 5000 metres at the 2019 Asian Athletics Championships was held on 21 April.

== Records ==
Records before the 2019 Asian Athletics Championships
Record	Athlete (nation)	Time (s)	Location	Date
World record	Tirunesh Dibaba (ETH)	14:11.15	Oslo, Norway	6 June 2008
Asian record	Bo Jiang (CHN)	14:28.09	Shanghai, China	23 October 1997
Championship record	Betlhem Desalegn (UAE)	15:12.84	Pune, India	7 July 2013
World leading	Laura Muir (GBR)	14:52.02	Glasgow, United Kingdom	4 January 2019
Asian leading	No times recorded			

== Results ==
Rank	Name	Nationality	Time	Notes
1st place, gold medalist(s)	Winfred Mutile Yavi	Bahrain	15:28.87	PB
2nd place, silver medalist(s)	Bontu Rebitu	Bahrain	15:29.60	SB
3rd place, bronze medalist(s)	Parul Chaudhary	India	15:36.03	PB
4	Sanjivani Jadhav	India	15:41.12	SB
5	Li Dan	China	15:43.33	PB
6	Nozomi Tanaka	Japan	15:44.59	
7	Zhao Yanli	China	16:05.39	SB
8	Tomomimusembi Takamatsu	Japan	16:08.16	
9	Gulshan Satarova	Kyrgyzstan	16:11.33	
10	Phạm Thị Huệ	Vietnam	17:01.13	SB
11	Phyu War Thet	Myanmar	17:22.69	SB
	Alia Saeed Mohammed	United Arab Emirates	DNS	
