= 2008 World Junior Championships in Athletics – Women's 3000 metres =

The women's 3000 metres event at the 2008 World Junior Championships in Athletics was held in Bydgoszcz, Poland, at Zawisza Stadium on 12 July.

== Medalists ==
Gold	Mercy Cherono; Kenya
Silver	Bizunesh Urgesa; Ethiopia
Bronze	Frehiwot Goshu; Ethiopia

== Results ==
=== Final ===
12 July

Rank	Name	Nationality	Time	Notes
1st place, gold medalist(s)	Mercy Cherono	Kenya	8:58.07	
2nd place, silver medalist(s)	Bizunesh Urgesa	Ethiopia	8:58.90	
3rd place, bronze medalist(s)	Frehiwot Goshu	Ethiopia	9:03.76	
4	Marina Gordeyeva	Russia	9:11.59	
5	Jacklin Chebii	Kenya	9:12.85	
6	Laurynne Chetelat	United States	9:15.11	
7	Yekaterina Gorbunova	Russia	9:15.59	
8	Tamara Jewet	Canada	9:15.74	
9	Joanne Harvey	United Kingdom	9:15.98	
10	Rei Ohara	Japan	9:16.09	
11	Lauren Howarth	United Kingdom	9:16.92	
12	Michi Numata	Japan	9:20.46	
13	Bogdana Mimic	Serbia	9:29.34	
14	Olga Skrypak	Ukraine	9:31.89	
15	Kim Seong-Eun	South Korea	9:38.85	
16	Doreen Chesang	Uganda	9:41.24	
17	Lyudmyla Kovalenko	Ukraine	9:42.05	
18	Karolina Waszak	Poland	10:07.77	

== Participation ==
According to an unofficial count, 18 athletes from 12 countries participated in the event.

- Canada (1)
- Ethiopia (2)
- Japan (2)
- Kenya (2)
- Poland (1)
- Russia (2)
- Serbia (1)
- South Korea (1)
- Uganda (1)
- Ukraine (2)
- United Kingdom (2)
- United States (1)
