= Rei Ohara =

Japanese long-distance runner

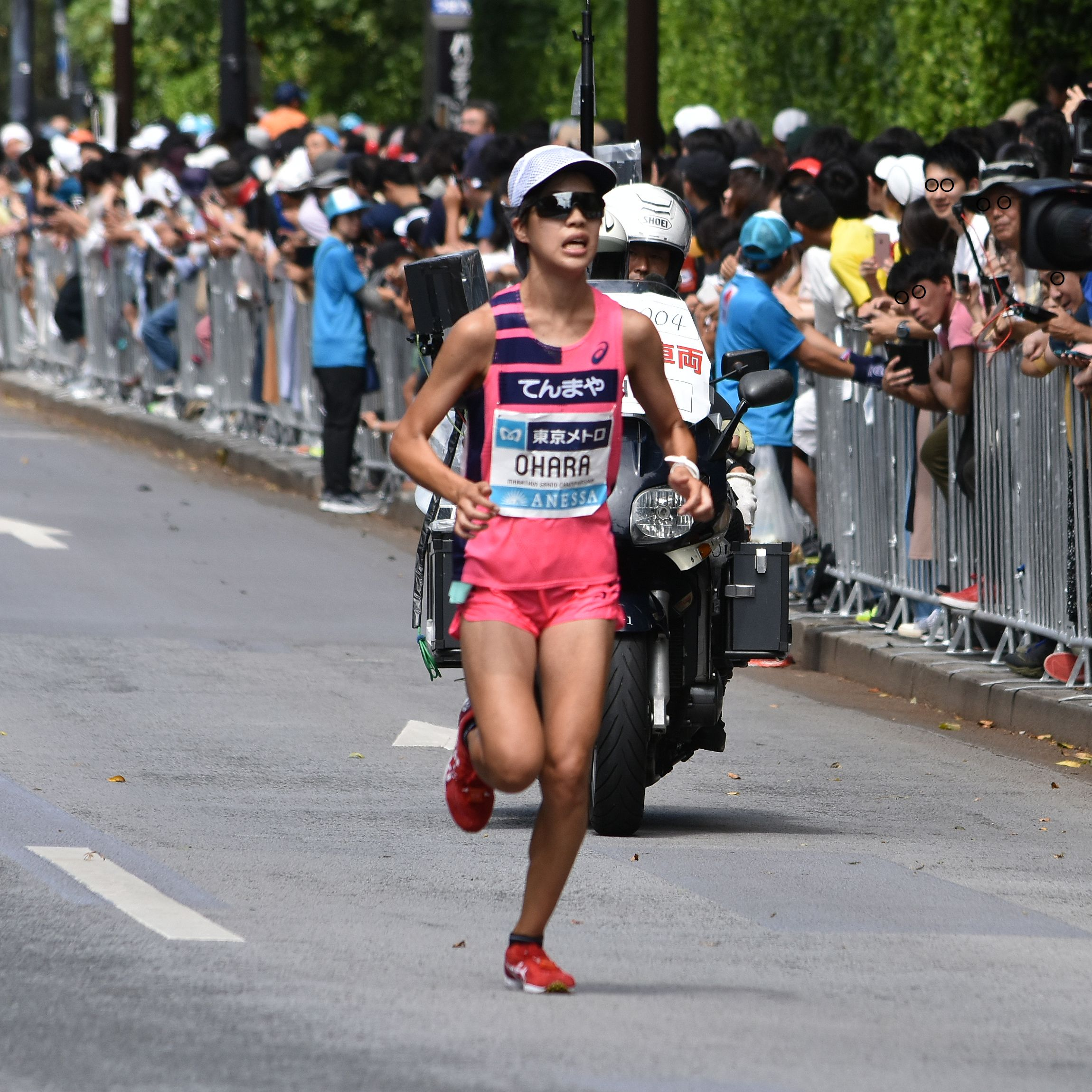
- Ohara in 2019

Personal information
- Born: 10 August 1990 (age 35) Kurashiki, Okayama Prefecture, Japan
- Height: 1.65 m (5 ft 5 in)
- Weight: 47 kg (104 lb)

Sport
- Sport: Track and field
- Event(s): 5000 m, 10,000 m
- Updated on 29 August 2015

Rei Ohara (小原 怜, Ohara Rei; born 10 August 1990) is a Japanese long-distance runner. She competed in the 10,000 metres at the 2015 World Championships in Beijing placing 22nd.

== International competitions ==
Year	Competition	Venue	Position	Event	Notes
Representing Japan
2007	World Youth Championships	Ostrava, Czech Republic	9th	1500 m	4:27.74
2008	World Junior Championships	Bydgoszcz, Poland	10th	3000 m	9:16.09
2011	Asian Championships	Kobe, Japan	7th	1500 m	4:28.09
2011	Asian Championships	Kobe, Japan	7th	5000 m	16:21.23
2012	Rock 'n' Roll Virginia Beach Half Marathon	Virginia Beach, United States	1st	Half Marathon	1:13:50
2015	World Championships	Beijing, China	22nd	10,000 m	32:47.74

== Personal bests ==
Outdoor

- 1500 metres – 4:19.16 (Okayama 2008)
- 3000 metres – 9:13.84 (Okayama 2009)
- 5000 metres – 15:40.60 (Yamaguchi 2011)
- 10,000 metres – 31:48.31 (Abashiri 2015)
- 10 kilometres – 32:39 (Okayama 2015)
- 15 kilometres – 48:46 (Okayama 2015)
- 20 kilometres – 1:05:38 (Okayama 2015)
- Half marathon – 1:09:17 (Okayama 2015)
- 25 kilometres – 1:25:15 (Nagoya 2015)
- Marathon – 2:23:20 (Nagoya 2016)
