= 2011 Asian Athletics Championships – Women's 1500 metres =

The women's 1500 metres at the 2011 Asian Athletics Championships was held at the Kobe Universiade Memorial Stadium on 8 July.

== Results ==
Rank	Name	Nationality	Time	Notes
1st place, gold medalist(s)	Genzeb Shumi Regasa	Bahrain	4:15.91	
2nd place, silver medalist(s)	Truong Thanh Hang	Vietnam	4:18.40	SB
3rd place, bronze medalist(s)	Jaisha Orchatteri Puthiya	India	4:21.41	
4	Akane Yabushita	Japan	4:22.09	
5	Betlhem Desalegn	United Arab Emirates	4:24.38	
6	Mika Kobayashi	Japan	4:25.72	
7	Rei Ohara	Japan	4:28.09	
8	Leila Ebrahimymojavery	Iran	4:28.33	
9	Surya Maya Rai	Nepal	4:43.24	PB
10	Yiu Kit Ching	Hong Kong	4:46.28	
11	Rabia Ashiq	Pakistan	4:57.89	
	Jhuma Khatun	India	DNF	
