= 2010 World Junior Championships in Athletics – Women's 5000 metres =

The women's 5,000 metres at the 2010 World Junior Championships in Athletics was held at the Moncton 2010 Stadium on 21 July.

== Medalists ==
Gold	Silver	Bronze
Genzebe Dibaba; Ethiopia	Mercy Cherono; Kenya	Alice Aprot Nawowuna; Kenya

== Records ==
Prior to the competition, the existing world junior and championship records were as follows.

	Name	Nationality	Time	Location	Date
World junior record	Tirunesh Dibaba	Ethiopia	14:30.88	Bergen	June 11, 2004
Championship record	Meselech Melkamu	Ethiopia	15:21.52	Grosseto	July 13, 2004

The following records were established during the competition:

Date	Round	Name	Nationality	Time	WJR	CR
July 21	Final	Genzebe Dibaba	Ethiopia	15:08.06		CR

== Results ==
Rank	Name	Nationality	Time	Notes
1st place, gold medalist(s)	Genzebe Dibaba	Ethiopia	15:08.06	CR
2nd place, silver medalist(s)	Mercy Cherono	Kenya	15:09.19	
3rd place, bronze medalist(s)	Alice Aprot Nawowuna	Kenya	15:17.39	PB
4	Tejitu Daba	Bahrain	15:29.78	NJR
5	Ayuko Suzuki	Japan	15:47.36	PB
6	Emily Sisson	United States	15:48.91	PB
7	Karla Díaz	Mexico	15:56.12	NJR
8	Nanaka Izawa	Japan	15:59.29	SB
9	Afera Godfay	Ethiopia	16:14.28	PB
10	Federica Bevilacqua	Italy	16:19.60	PB
11	Kate Avery	United Kingdom	16:23.97	SB
12	Gulshat Fazlitdinova	Russia	16:27.69	
13	Goeun Yeum	South Korea	16:49.18	
14	Victoria Hanna	Canada	17:28.99	

Key: CR = championship record, NJR = National junior record, PB = Personal best, SB = Seasonal best

== Participation ==
According to an unofficial count, 14 athletes from 11 countries participated in the event.

- Bahrain (1)
- Canada (1)
- Ethiopia (2)
- Italy (1)
- Japan (2)
- Kenya (2)
- Mexico (1)
- Russia (1)
- South Korea (1)
- United Kingdom (1)
- United States (1)
