= Athletics at the 2015 African Games – Women's 10,000 metres =

The women's 10,000 metres event at the 2015 African Games was held on 16 September.

== Results ==
Rank	Name	Nationality	Time	Notes
1st place, gold medalist(s)	Alice Aprot	Kenya	31:24.18	GR
2nd place, silver medalist(s)	Gladys Kiptagelai	Kenya	31:36.87	SB
3rd place, bronze medalist(s)	Gelete Burka	Ethiopia	31:38.33	
4	Wude Ayalew	Ethiopia	31:39.81	
5	Agnes Chebet	Kenya	32:55.41	SB
6	Clementine Mukandanga	Rwanda	33:15.54	
7	Claudette Mukasakindi	Rwanda	33:40.10	
	Netsanet Gudeta	Ethiopia	DNF	
	Clene Mambeke	Republic of the Congo	DNS	
