= Li Dan (runner) =

Chinese long-distance runner

Personal information
- Born: 1 May 1995 (age 31)

Sport
- Country: China
- Sport: Long-distance running
Medal record
Women's long-distance running
Representing China
Military World Games
Bronze medal – third place	2019 Wuhan	Marathon
Bronze medal – third place	2019 Wuhan	Marathon team

Li Dan (Chinese: 李丹; born 1 May 1995) is a Chinese long-distance runner. In 2019, she competed in the women's marathon at the 2019 World Athletics Championships held in Doha, Qatar. She did not finish her race.

== Career ==
In 2018, she competed in the women's 5000 metres event at the 2018 Asian Games held in Indonesia. In 2019, she finished in 5th place in the women's 5000 metres event at the 2019 Asian Athletics Championships held in Doha, Qatar. In that same year, she won the bronze medal in the women's marathon at the 2019 Military World Games held in Wuhan, China. She also won the bronze medal in the women's marathon team event, alongside Ma Yugui and Zheng Zhiling.

== Competition record ==
Year	Competition	Venue	Position	Event	Notes
Representing China
2018	Asian Games	Jakarta, Indonesia	9th	5000 m	16:18.91
2019	Asian Championships	Doha, Qatar	5th	5000 m	15:43.33
2019	World Championships	Doha, Qatar	-	Marathon	DNF
2019	Military World Games	Wuhan, China	3rd	Marathon	2:30:33
