= Violah Jepchumba =

Kenyan long-distance runner

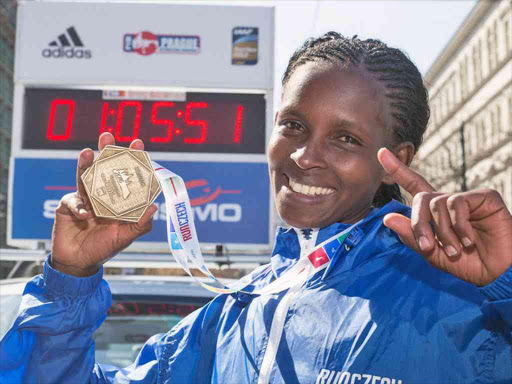
- Violah Jepchumba in Prague

Personal information
- Full name: Violah Jepchumba Kilonzo Motosio
- Nationality: Bahrain
- Born: 16 August 1990 (age 36) Kenya

Sport
- Sport: Long-distance running
Medal record
Women's athletics
Representing Bahrain
Asian Games
Gold medal – first place	2022 Hangzhou	10,000 m
Islamic Solidarity Games
Silver medal – second place	2025 Riyadh	10,000 m

Violah Jepchumba Kilonzo Motosio (born 23 October 1990), also known as Violah Jepchumba, is a Kenyan-born Bahraini long-distance runner who competes in road running events up to the half marathon distance. During her career she has represented both Kenya and Bahrain. She is the current Asian Record holder in the half-marathon (established 1 April 2017) with a winning time of 1:05:22. In 2016, at Praha, she ran a personal best of 1:05:51, which then ranked her as the third fastest woman ever.

== Career ==
She began competing internationally in 2014 and was runner-up in her first European outing at the Parelloop. That year she won a series of lower-level German road races, including the Paderborner Osterlauf, as well as the Route du Vin Half Marathon in Luxembourg. In the 2015 season she improved her half marathon best to 1:11:46 at the Göteborgsvarvet, was runner-up at the Kärnten Läuft, then won the Udine Half Marathon in a new best of 1:09:29.

Jepchumba raised her status with a win at the Discovery Kenya Cross Country in January 2016, beating athletes including world medallists Helah Kiprop and Hyvin Kiyeng, and elite marathon runner Jemima Sumgong. She entered the Prague Half Marathon and delivered far beyond expectations with a winning time of 1:05:51. This was the fourth fastest time ever recorded for the distance. Only Florence Jebet Kiplagat and Mary Jepkosgei Keitany had run faster at that point. She extended her win streak at the Istanbul Half Marathon later that month.

In July 2017 Jepchumba transferred her allegiance for athletics events from Kenya to Bahrain.

She tested positive for erythropoietin (EPO) in drug tests in August and September 2017 and received a four-year ban for doping.

Jepchumba won the gold medal in the 10,000m at the 2022 Asian Games in Hangzhou.

== Circuit wins ==
- Istanbul Half Marathon: 2016 – 1st place; time 1:08:18
- Prague Half Marathon: 2016 – 1st place; time 1:05:22
- Göteborgsvarvet Half Marathon: 2016 – 1st place; time 1:08:01
- Discovery Kenya Cross Country: 2016 – 1st place; time (unknown)
- Udine Half Marathon: 2015 – 1st place; time 1:09:29
- Laayoune Half Marathon: 2015 – 1st place; time 1:12:35
- Casablanca Memorial Rahal 10K: 2015– 1st place; time 32:09
- Route du Vin Half Marathon: 2014 – 1st place; time 1:13:20
- Paderborner Osterlauf 10K: 2014 – 1st place; time 32:21
