= Kazakhstan at the 2009 World Championships in Athletics =

- WA code: KAZ

in Berlin
- Competitors: 14 (6 men, 8 women)
- Medals: Gold 0 Silver 0 Bronze 0 Total 0

World Championships in Athletics appearances
- 1993; 1995; 1997; 1999; 2001; 2003; 2005; 2007; 2009; 2011; 2013; 2015; 2017; 2019; 2022; 2023

Kazakhstan competes at the 2009 World Championships in Athletics 15–23 August 2009 in Berlin.

== Team selection ==
Track and road events

Event	Athletes	
Event	Men	Women
200 metres	Vyacheslav Muravyev	
400 metres		Marina Maslenko
100 metre hurdles		Natalya Ivoninskaya
400 metre hurdles		Tatyana Azarova
20 km race walk	Rustam Kuvatov	Svetlana Tolstaya

Field and combined events

Event	Athletes	
Event	Men	Women
High jump	Sergey Zasimovich	Marina Aitova; Yekaterina Yevseyeva
Long jump	Konstantin Safronov	
Triple jump	Yevgeniy Ektov	Irina Litvinenko; Olga Rypakova
Decathlon	Dmitriy Karpov	
