= Doris Changeywo =

Kenyan long-distance runner (born 1984)

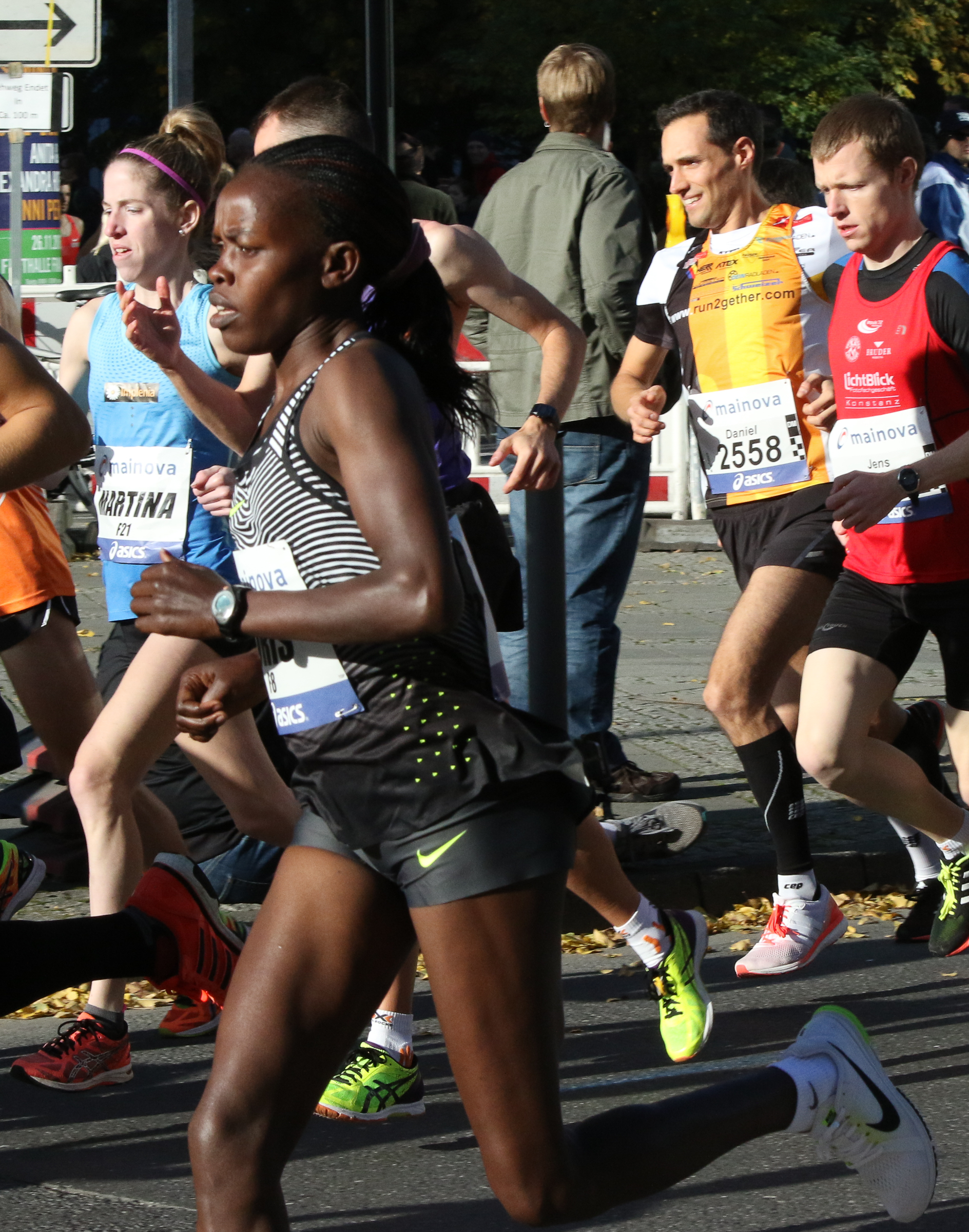
- Frankfurt Marathon 2016

Medal record

Women's athletics

Representing Kenya

Commonwealth Games
Silver medal – second place	2010 New Delhi	10,000 m

Doris Chepkwemoi Changeywo (born 12 December 1984) is a Kenyan professional long-distance runner who specialises in the 10,000 metres and cross country running.

She began to enjoy success in athletics in 2006, becoming the East African cross country champion and winning at the first Shoe4Africa Women's 10km race. She gained her first major title at the 2007 Military World Games, winning the 10,000 metres gold medal. The following year she came third at the Kenyan cross championships and gained selection for the 2008 IAAF World Cross Country Championships, where she finished in fourth place and helped Kenya to the women's team silver medal. She was the winner of the 2008 edition of the Great Ireland Run and also won the Würzburger Residenzlauf that year.

At the 2010 African Championships in Athletics, she ran over 10,000 m and took fifth place. Changeywo represented Kenya at the 2010 Commonwealth Games in October and won the silver medal, finishing as runner-up to compatriot Grace Momanyi. She made her debut over the half marathon at the Delhi Half Marathon two months later, where she came tenth in a time of 1:10:40.

She ran at the Cross Internacional Zornotza in January the following year and came second behind Pauline Korikwiang. She missed out on a place on the World team that year, finishing ninth at the trials, but was selected to compete at the 2011 African Cross Country Championships instead. She took the bronze medal as part of a Kenyan medal sweep with Mercy Cherono and Viola Kibiwot. In April, she won the Würzburger race with a 10K best of 31:26 minutes and then ran a half marathon best of 1:08:49 hours in Rabat. On the track she claimed the 10,000 m gold medal at the 2011 Military World Games in Rio de Janeiro, beating fellow Kenyan Lineth Chepkurui to defend her title. Turning to the roads again, she won the Porto Half Marathon and then was the runner-up behind Aselefech Mergia at the Great South Run 10-miler in October.

She took third place on the podium at the 2012 Great Manchester Run and World 10K Bangalore races.

She is married to Kenya's long-distance runner Moses Masai as the couple has a daughter.

== Achievements ==
Year	Competition	Venue	Position	Event
2007	Military World Games	Hyderabad, India	1st	10,000 m
2008	World Cross Country Championships	Edinburgh, Scotland	4th	Senior race
2008	World Cross Country Championships	Edinburgh, Scotland	2nd	Team competition
2010	Commonwealth Games	New Delhi, India	2nd	10,000 m
2011	African Cross Country Championships	Cape Town, South Africa	3rd	Senior 8 km
2011	2011 Military World Games	Rio de Janeiro, Brazil	1st	10,000 m

=== Personal bests ===
- 5000 metres - 15:18.01 min (2008)
- 10,000 metres - 31:31.01 min (2008)
- 10 km (road) - 31:26 min (2011)
- Half marathon - 1:08:49 hrs (2011)
