= 2011 African Cross Country Championships =

2011 running competition

I Africa Cross Country Championships
- Organisers: CAA
- Edition: 1st
- Date: 6 March 2011
- Host city: Cape Town, South Africa
- Events: 4

The 1st African Cross Country Championships was an international cross country running competition for African athletes which was held on 6 March 2011 in Cape Town, South Africa. Organised by the Confederation of African Athletics, it marked the start of a new continental competition for Africa following the decision by the IAAF to alter the scheduling of the World Cross Country Championships from every year to a biennial format.

The event consisted of four race categories, featuring senior and junior races for men and women. The Kenyan athletes took a complete sweep of the competition, winning all the individual medals and the four team titles. Mercy Cherono, a former World Junior Champion, took the women's senior title while the less well-known John Mwangangi won the men's senior race. Japhet Korir and Caroline Chepkoech won the men's and women's junior gold medals, respectively. Sigosi Chesonane, representing the host nation, was the only non-Kenyan to reach the top five in an event, finishing fifth in the men's senior race.

Although Kenya dominated the competition, none of its runners at the African event ran at the 2011 IAAF World Cross Country Championships two weeks later. Athletics Kenya sent the best performers at that year's Kenya Cross Country Championships to the world event, while those ranking seventh to tenth in the national race were sent to the event in Cape Town. The continent's second foremost nation in cross country, Ethiopia, did not send any athletes to the competition.

The Kenyan team's jubilant celebrations led to the entire squad of 30 runners and officials missing their flight for Nairobi, scheduled later that day at Cape Town International Airport.

== Medallists ==
=== Individual ===
Event	Gold		Silver		Bronze	
Senior men's 12 km	John Mwangangi (KEN)	35:31 min	Stephen Kiprotich (UGA)	35:34 min	Henry Chirchir (KEN)	35:35 min
Senior women's 8 km	Mercy Cherono (KEN)	27:13 min	Viola Kibiwot (KEN)	27:14 min	Doris Changeywo (KEN)	27:22 min
Junior men's 8 km	Japhet Korir (KEN)	23:03 min	Patrick Muaka (KEN)	23:04 min	Nicholas Togom (KEN)	23:18 min
Junior women's 6 km	Caroline Chepkoech (KEN)	19:59 min	Mary Mananu (KEN)	20:00 min	Zipporah Wanjiru (KEN)	20:05 min

== Participation ==
- Angola
- Botswana
- Kenya
- Lesotho
- Madagascar
- Malawi
- Mauritius
- Morocco
- Mozambique
- Namibia
- Nigeria
- South Africa
- Sudan
- Uganda
- Zambia
- Zimbabwe
