= Kazakhstan at the 2011 World Championships in Athletics =

- WA code: KAZ
- National federation: Athletic Federation of the Republic of Kazakhstan
- Website: www.kazathletics.kz

in Daegu
- Competitors: 14
- Medals: Gold 0 Silver 1 Bronze 0 Total 1

World Championships in Athletics appearances
- 1993; 1995; 1997; 1999; 2001; 2003; 2005; 2007; 2009; 2011; 2013; 2015; 2017; 2019; 2022; 2023

Kazakhstan competed at the 2011 World Championships in Athletics from August 27 to September 4 in Daegu, South Korea.

== Team selection ==
A team of 14 athletes was announced to represent the country in the event. The team will be led by former olympic medalist Dmitriy Karpov and triple jumper Olga Rypakova.

The following athletes appeared on the preliminary Entry List, but not on the Official Start List of the specific event:

KEY:	Did not participate	Competed in another event

	Event	Athlete
Women	800 metres	Viktoriya Yalovtseva
Women	4 x 400 metres relay	Margarita Matsko

== Medalists ==
The following competitor from Kazakhstan won a medal at the Championships

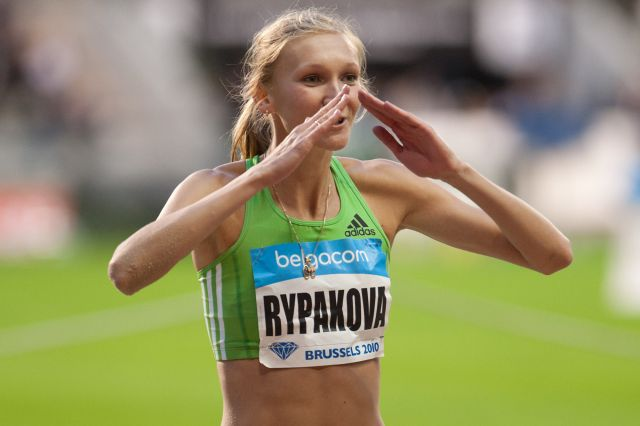
Olga Rypakova won a silver medal (Women's Triple Jump) at this year's championships (archived from Brussels 2010)

Medal	Athlete	Event
Silver	Olga Rypakova	Triple jump

== Results ==
=== Men ===
Athlete	Event	Preliminaries		Heats		Semifinals		Final	
Athlete	Event	Time Width Height	Rank	Time Width Height	Rank	Time Width Height	Rank	Time Width Height	Rank
Yevgeniy Ektov	Triple jump	NM						Did not advance	

Decathlon

Dmitriy Karpov	Decathlon			
Dmitriy Karpov	Event	Results	Points	Rank
	100 m	11.24	808	25
	Long jump	6.86	781	24
	Shot put	15.69	832	5
	High jump	1.93	740	24
	400 m	52.01	724	27
	110 m hurdles	14.64 (SB)	894	13
	Discus throw	47.10	810	7
	Pole vault	4.80	849	11
	Javelin throw	46.91	543	22
	1500 m	4:58.41	569	20
Total			7550	21

=== Women ===
Athlete	Event	Preliminaries		Heats		Semifinals		Final	
Athlete	Event	Time Width Height	Rank	Time Width Height	Rank	Time Width Height	Rank	Time Width Height	Rank
Olga Bludova	100 metres			11.62	37	Did not advance			
Viktoriya Zyabkina	200 metres			24.09	31	Did not advance			
Margarita Matsko	800 metres			2:04.24	31	Did not advance			
Natalya Ivoninskaya	100 m hurdles			12.96	11	12.96	15	Did not advance	
Anastasiya Soprunova	100 m hurdles			13.43	30	Did not advance			
Alexandra Kuzina; Viktoriya Yalovtseva; Marina Maslenko; Tatyana Khadjimuradova	4 x 400 metres relay			DNF				Did not advance	
Olga Rypakova	Triple jump	14.33	6					14.89	2nd place, silver medalist(s)
Irina Ektova	Triple jump	14.01	17					Did not advance	
Marina Aitova	High jump	1.89	19					Did not advance	
