= Caroline Chepkoech Kipkirui =

Kenyan-Kazakhstani long-distance runner

Medal record

Women's athletics

Representing Kazakhstan

Asian Games
Bronze medal – third place	2022 Hangzhou	10,000m

Asian Indoor Championships
Gold medal – first place	2023 Astana	3000m

Caroline Chepkoech Kipkirui (Kazakh: Каролин Чепкоеч Кипкируи; born 26 May 1994) is a Kenyan-Kazakhstani professional long-distance runner who competes in distances from 3000 metres to the half marathon. She has worked at the Altay Athletics club in Kazakhstan since 2017, coached by Ken Rotich of Kenya and USA Richards Anderson. At junior level, she was twice African champion and shared in the team gold medal at the IAAF World Cross Country Championships.

Kipkirui is currently serving a competition ban set to expire in February 2026 for an anti-doping rule violation.

== Career ==
Born in Kericho, she is the younger sister of fellow distance runner Mercy Cherono. She had a very successful international career in the age category competitions. She won the inaugural junior race at the 2011 African Cross Country Championships and claimed the 5000 metres gold at the 2011 African Junior Athletics Championships and 3000 metres bronze medal at the 2011 World Youth Championships in Athletics that same year. The 2012 World Junior Championships in Athletics saw her take fifth in the 5000 m, then she ended up fourth at the 2013 IAAF World Cross Country Championships, helping the Kenyan women to the junior team title alongside individual medallists Faith Chepngetich Kipyegon and Agnes Jebet Tirop.

She made her half marathon pacing London marathon in 2017. She missed the majority of the 2014 and 2015 seasons but returned with a tour of races in the United States in 2016. She won the Azalea Trail Run, Bay to Breakers, Falmouth Road Race and Silicon Valley Turkey Trot, as well as top three finishes at the Beach to Beacon 10K, Bix 7 Road Race, Bolder Boulder and Carlsbad 5000. She began 2017 with a win at the Antrim International Cross Country, but had bad fortune at both the Kenyan Cross Country Championships, which she failed to finish. She was the pacer for the first half of the women's only marathon (1:06:53) record set by Mary Keitany in the 2017 London Marathon. Her year ended with high notes as she defended her title at the Falmouth Road Race, was runner-up at the Memorial Van Damme 5000 m in a new personal best of 14:27.55 minutes and placed third at the Great North Run. In January 2018 she lowered her half marathon personal best to 1:06:50, placing 2nd in the Houston Half Marathon, and a month later at the RAK Half Marathon, she lowered it again to 1:05:07, becoming the 4th fastest female half marathoner of all time. Caroline ran also ran her 2nd fastest half marathon time ever on 7 April 2018 in Prague, Czech Republic, in 66:09, finishing 2nd to Joan Melly, who won in 65:04, subsequently taking the spot as the 4th fastest female half marathoner ever.

In June 2022, Kipkirui transferred her internationality eligibility from Kenya to Kazakhstan.

In March 2024, Kipkirui was issued with a two-year ban backdated to expire in February 2026 for an anti-doping rule violation for whereabouts failures.

== International competitions ==
Year	Competition	Venue	Position	Event	Notes
Representing Kenya
2011	African Cross Country Championships	Cape Town, South Africa	1st	Junior race	19:59
2011	African Junior Championships	Gaborone, Botswana	1st	5000 m	15:24.66
2011	World Youth Championships	Lille, France	3rd	3000 m	8:58.83
2012	World Junior Championships	Barcelona, Spain	5th	5000 m	15:58.10
2013	World Cross Country Championships	Bydgoszcz, Poland	4th	Junior race	18:09
2013	World Cross Country Championships	Bydgoszcz, Poland	1st	Junior team	14 pts
Representing Kazakhstan
2023	Asian Championships	Bangkok, Thailand	4th	5000 m	16:10.20
2023	Asian Championships	Bangkok, Thailand	–	10,000 m	DNF
2023	World Championships	Budapest, Hungary	–	10,000 m	DNF
2023	Asian Games	Hangzhou, China	1st	5000 m	15:23.12
2023	Asian Games	Hangzhou, China	3rd	10,000 m	33:15.83
