= Salome Nyirarukundo =

Rwandan long-distance runner

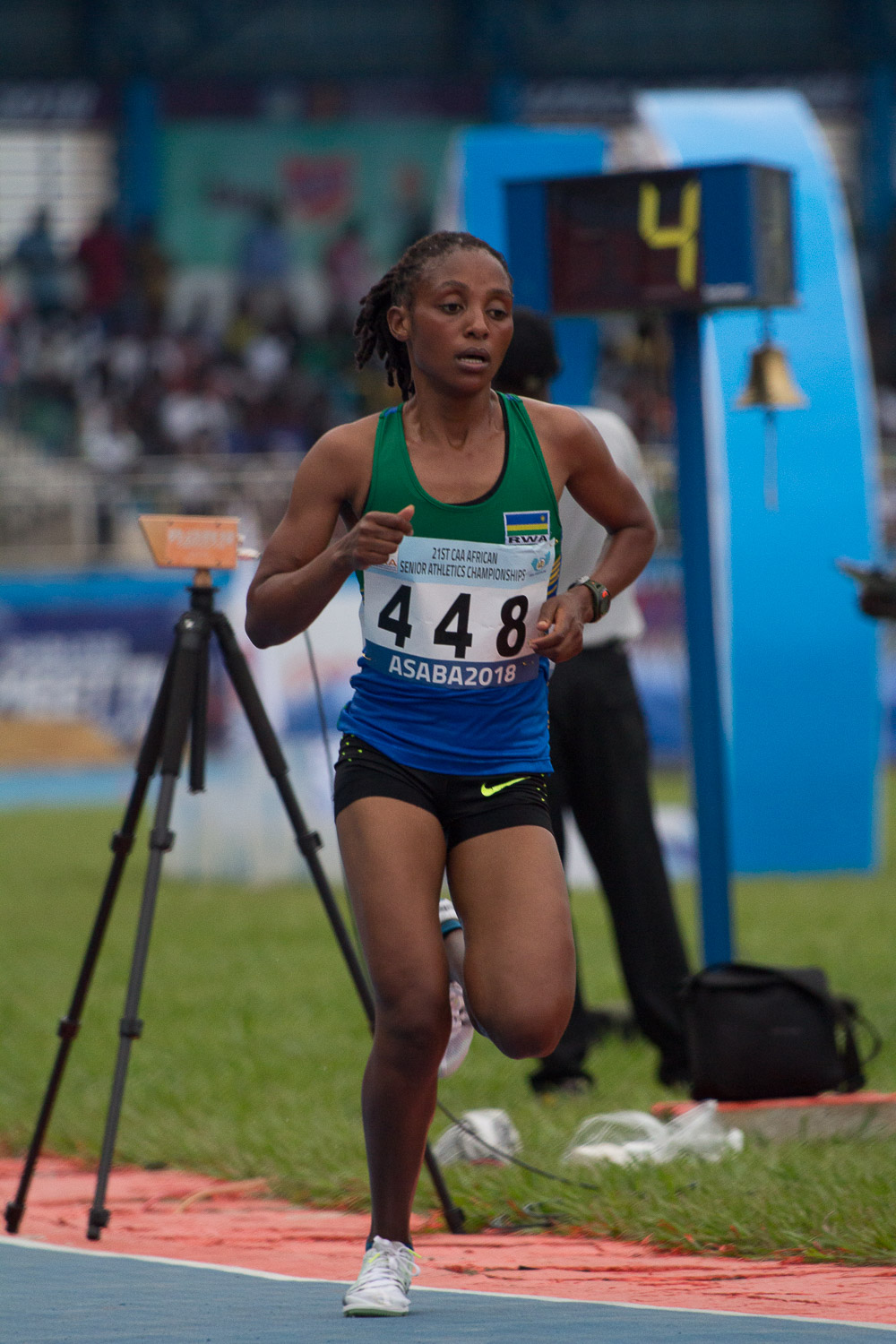
- Salome Nyirarukundoat the 2018 African Athletics Championships

Personal information
- Nationality: Rwandan
- Born: 20 December 1997 (age 28) Kivumo, Rutsiro District, Rwanda
- Height: 1.57 m (5 ft 2 in)
- Weight: 42 kg (93 lb)

Sport
- Sport: Athletics
- Event: Long distance runner

Salome Nyirarukundo (born 20 December 1997) is a Rwandan long-distance runner.

She competed at the 2016 Summer Olympics in Rio de Janeiro, in the women's 10,000 metres, finishing in 27th place with a time of 32:07.80.

== Road running ==
=== 2017–2018 ===
Nyirarukundo is also a seasoned marathoner, and has taken part in several major competitions. She set a personal best time at the Montreal Marathon (2:28:02). She won several competitions in the Province of Quebec, including the Rimouski marathon.

=== 2019 ===
Nyirarukundo had a busy 2019. In the Around The Bay 30K race, she finished 3rd after elite athletes, even though she led for 15 kilometers of the race. She won the 10k St-Laurent race with a time of 34 minutes. She took second place at 5k du Lac-Beauport and won the Lévis Half-Marathon in a record time of 1 h 13 min 59 s. She finished 4th at the Ottawa Marathon in 2 h 30 min and made another 10k, this time that of lululemon Toronto in 34 minutes, another time. Then, she made two other victories in the 10k, that of La Baie and that of Canada Road Races Day. After that, she participated in the Rimouski Marathon; the conditions were bad and Nyirarukundo started at a conservative pace to win (1:25 to half). Even with this reduced pace, she hit the wall and finished in 3:14. Due to the bad conditions, no woman could overtake her and she won the race for the second time in a row.

Personal bests
Distance	Time	Event	Place
5,000 meters	15 min 34 s 91 c	Netherlands - Nijmegen	5th
5 kilometers	15 min 50 s	Germany - Trier	2nd
10,000 meters	31 min 45 s 62 c	South Africa - Durban	4th
Half-marathon	1 h 08 min 48 s	Spain - Barcelona	3rd
Marathon	2 h 28 min 02 s	Canada - Montreal	1st
