= Mercy Cherono =

Kenyan long-distance runner (born 1991)

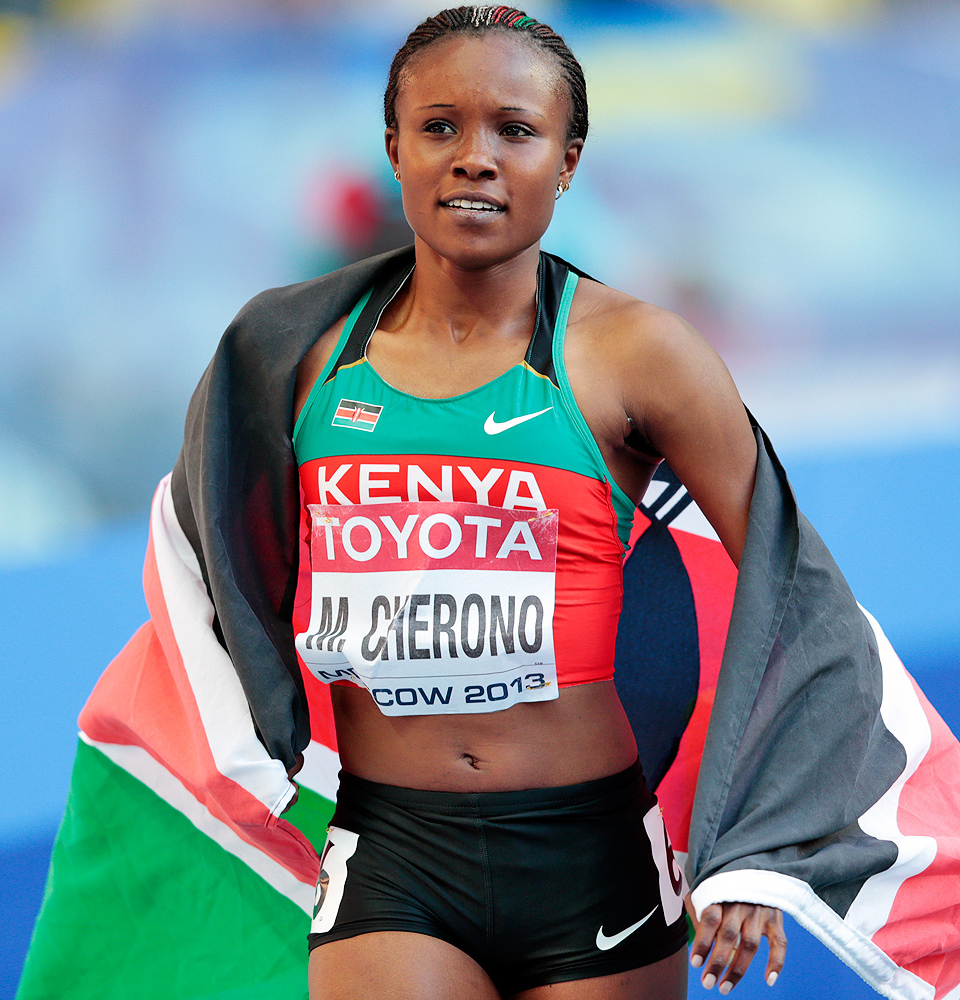
- Cherono at the 2013 World Championships

Medal record

Women's athletics

Representing Kenya

World Championships
Silver medal – second place	2013 Moscow	5000 m

Commonwealth Games
Gold medal – first place	2014 Glasgow	5000 m

World Junior Championships
Gold medal – first place	2008 Bydgoszcz	3000 m
Gold medal – first place	2010 Moncton	3000 m
Silver medal – second place	2010 Moncton	5000 m

World Cross Country Championships
Gold medal – first place	2010 Bydgoszcz	Junior race
Silver medal – second place	2009 Amman	Junior race

Mercy Cherono Koech (born 7 May 1991) is a Kenyan professional long-distance runner. She was the silver medalist in the 5000 metres at the 2013 World Championships in Athletics.

She is a two-time world junior champion in the 3000 metres (2008, 2010) and has also won gold medals at the 2007 World Youth Championships in Athletics and 2008 Commonwealth Youth Games. She has been a success junior athlete in cross country running, taking the silver medals in the junior team and individual competitions at the 2009 IAAF World Cross Country Championships and improving to the gold medals at the 2010 edition.

== Career ==
Cherono made her first international appearance at the 2007 IAAF World Cross Country Championships in Mombasa and she finished 23rd in the junior race. She reached her first international podium at the 2007 World Youth Championships as she ran a championship record time of 8:53.94 to win the gold medal in the 3000 metres. She had a successful cross county season at the end of the year, taking 6 km junior race victories in three of the Athletics Kenya meetings. She had back-to-back wins in the junior race at the Tuskys Wareng Cross Country in 2007 and 2008.

She did not receive selection for the 2008 World Cross Country Championships, but instead focused on track running. First she added a junior title to her youth 3000 m win, beating Bizunesh Urgesa in a time of 8:58.07 to win the gold at the 2008 World Junior Championships in Bydgoszcz, and then she won the gold at the 2008 Commonwealth Youth Games, running largely uncontested to set a Games record time.

Her place on the Kenyan world cross country team looked uncertain in 2009 as head coach Julius Kirwa dismissed her chances, saying she had run too many races that season. Cherono replied by taking the lead immediately at the Kenyan Trials and winning the junior race by a margin of thirteen seconds. At the 2009 World Cross Country Championships in Amman, Cherono engaged in a race-long duel with Genzebe Dibaba in the junior race. Cherono took the lead in the final stages but a difficult stretch with a 40-metre climb enabled Dibaba to overtake her and Cherono ended up with the silver medal. At the 2009 African Junior Athletics Championships, Cherono eased to the 3000 m title by some 13 seconds but found herself beaten again by Genzebe Dibaba in 5000 m race, finishing with the silver medal. She competed on the senior track circuit that year and was third at the Rieti IAAF Grand Prix, recording a personal best of 8:44.67 for the 3000 m. She took third for a second time at the Memorial van Damme in September, recording personal bests in the 1500 metres and 2000 metres and beaten only by reigning world champions Gelete Burka and Vivian Cheruiyot.

She won a junior cross country race on home turf in Kericho in late 2009, but failed to reach the top three at the 2010 Kenyan Trials. Her fourth-place finish was enough to gain a place on the team for the 2010 World Cross Country Championships. Cherono rose to the occasion at the World Championships in Bydgoszcz, the same location as her 2008 World Junior win. She led with her Kenyan teammates for much of the race and she won by a margin of seven seconds, leading home a 1–2–3–4 victory for the Kenyan team. Despite the significant winning margin, she did not need to push herself to the victory, later saying: "In the second lap, I had a lot left". She made her first outing on the IAAF Diamond League circuit in May, running a personal best of 14:47.13 for seventh in the 5000 metres at the Shanghai Golden Grand Prix. At the 2010 World Junior Championships in Athletics, Cherono became the first woman to retain the 3000 m junior title as she held off a challenge from Emebet Anteneh to become the first gold medallist of the event. She also won a silver medal in the 5000 m, finishing behind Genzebe Dibaba.

Taking to the senior circuit, she ran at the Rieti IAAF Grand Prix in August and took second in the 3000 m behind Sylvia Kibet, setting a new lifetime best of 8:42.09. She turned her focus to senior cross country and won at the AK meet in Kericho in November, while her sister Caroline Chepkoech went on to win the junior race. She was chosen as the most promising sportswoman at Kenya's annual SOYA Awards. In January 2011 she ran at the Discovery Kenya Cross Country meet in Eldoret, but misjudged her run and slipped into fourth place near the end.

Cherono came thirteenth in the national senior cross country race in February 2011. Although she missed out on a place for the world team, she headed to the newly created 2011 African Cross Country Championships and won the gold in a medal sweep alongside Viola Kibiwot and Doris Changeywo. Her cross country season ended with a top three finish at the Trofeo Alasport. On the 2011 Diamond League circuit she placed in the top three of the 5000 m at the Prefontaine Classic and the Meeting Areva. She was chosen for the Kenyan senior track team for the first time and came fifth over 5000 m at the 2011 World Championships in Athletics.

She began 2012 win with a sizeable win at the Campaccio cross country. She missed her chance to run at the 2012 Summer Olympics but was dominant on the track circuit that year: she won the Herculis, Athletissima and British Grand Prix 2012 IAAF Diamond League meets and was runner-up at the London Grand Prix, Weltklasse Zurich and Memorial van Damme. A 3000 m personal best of 8:38.51 minutes came at the Herculis meet. After the track season she won the Cross Internacional de Venta de Baños and the Cross de Itálica.

Cherono won the national trials for the 5000 m and went on to claim the silver medal in the event at the 2013 World Championships in Athletics behind Meseret Defar. On the 2013 IAAF Diamond League circuit she was runner-up in the 1500 m at the Memorial Van Damme, runner-up in the 3000 m at the DN Galan, and placed in the top three of the 5000 m a both the Prefontaine Classic and the Weltklasse Zürich. She returned to the Cross de Venta de Baños and won for a consecutive season. On 19 August 2016, Cherono came in 4th place in the 5000m event at the Rio Olympics in 14:42.89 out of a field of 17 runners.

== Personal ==
Cherono is from Kipajit village, near Sotik town. She started running while at Kipajit Primary School and later moved to Chelimo Primary School near Kericho and eventually Ngariet Secondary School in Sotik. She is coached by Gabriel Kiptanui and managed by Gabriel Rosa. She is the oldest of six siblings. Her younger sister Sharon Chepkorir is also a runner. Their father John Koech runs a training camp in Kipajit village.

Cherono won the Most Promising Sportswoman of the Year category at the 2009 Kenyan Sports Personality of the Year awards, and repeated by winning the same category the next year.

== Achievements ==
Year	Competition	Venue	Position	Event	Notes
2007	World Cross Country Championships	Mombasa, Kenya	23rd	Junior race (6 km)	22:32
2007	World Youth Championships	Ostrava, Czech Republic	1st	3000 m	8:53.94
2008	World Junior Championships	Bydgoszcz, Poland	1st	3000 m	8:58.07
2008	Commonwealth Youth Games	Pune, India	1st	3000 m	9:06.01
2009	World Cross Country Championships	Amman, Jordan	2nd	Junior race (6 km)	20:17
2009	World Cross Country Championships	Amman, Jordan	2nd	Junior team	18 pts
2009	African Junior Championships	Bambous, Mauritius	1st	3000 m	8:54.96
2009	African Junior Championships	Bambous, Mauritius	2nd	5000 m	16:12.65
2010	World Cross Country Championships	Bydgoszcz, Poland	1st	Junior race (5.833 km)	18:47
2010	World Cross Country Championships	Bydgoszcz, Poland	1st	Junior team	10 pts
2010	World Junior Championships	Moncton, Canada	1st	3000 m	8:55.07
2010	World Junior Championships	Moncton, Canada	2nd	5000 m	15:09.19
2011	African Cross Country Championships	Cape Town, South Africa	1st	Senior race (8 km)	27:13
2011	World Championships	Daegu, South Korea	5th	5000 m	15:00.23
2013	World Championships	Moscow, Russia	2nd	5000 m	14:51.22
2014	Commonwealth Games	Glasgow, Scotland	1st	5000 m	15:07.21
2015	World Championships	Beijing, China	5th	5000 m	15:01.36
2016	Olympic Games	Rio de Janeiro, Brazil	4th	5000 m	14:42.89

== See also ==
- Caleb Mwangangi Ndiku
- List of World Athletics Championships medalists (women)
- List of Commonwealth Games medallists in athletics (women)
