= Bontu Rebitu =

Bahraini long-distance runner

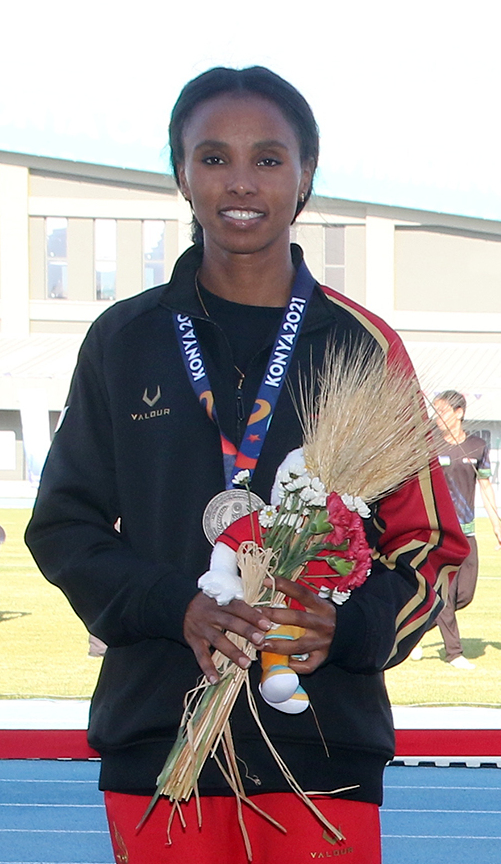

Personal information
- Full name: Bontu Edao Rebitu
- Nationality: Bahraini
- Born: 12 December 1997 (age 28)
- Height: 1.60 m (5 ft 3 in)
- Weight: 49 kg (108 lb)

Sport
- Sport: Long-distance running
- Event: 5000 metres
Medal record
Asian Games
Bronze medal – third place	2018 Jakarta	5,000 metres
Asian Championships
Silver medal – second place	2019 Doha	5,000 metres
World U20 Championships
Bronze medal – third place	2016 Bydgoszcz	5,000 metres
Islamic Solidarity Games
Silver medal – second place	2021 Konya	5000 metres
Silver medal – second place	2021 Konya	10,000 metres
Arab Games
Gold medal – first place	2023 Bir El Djir	5000 metres
Gold medal – first place	2023 Bir El Djir	10,000 metres
GCC Games
Gold medal – first place	2022 Kuwait City	5000 metres
Gold medal – first place	2022 Kuwait City	10,000 metres
West Asian Championships
Gold medal – first place	2018 Amman	5000 metres
Gold medal – first place	2023 Doha	5000 metres
Gold medal – first place	2023 Doha	10,000 metres

Bontu Edao Rebitu (born 12 December 1997) is a Bahraini long-distance runner. She competed in the women's 5000 metres at the 2017 World Championships in Athletics.
