= Ciren Cuomu =

Chinese long-distance runner

Personal information
- Born: 27 August 1997 (age 28)

Sport
- Country: China
- Sport: Long-distance running

Ciren Cuomu (born 27 August 1997) is a Chinese long-distance runner. In 2019, she competed in the women's marathon at the 2019 World Athletics Championships held in Doha, Qatar. She finished in 33rd place.

In 2017, she competed in the senior women's race at the 2017 IAAF World Cross Country Championships held in Kampala, Uganda. She finished in 72nd place.
