= Shitaye Eshete =

Ethiopian-Bahraini long-distance runner (born 1990)

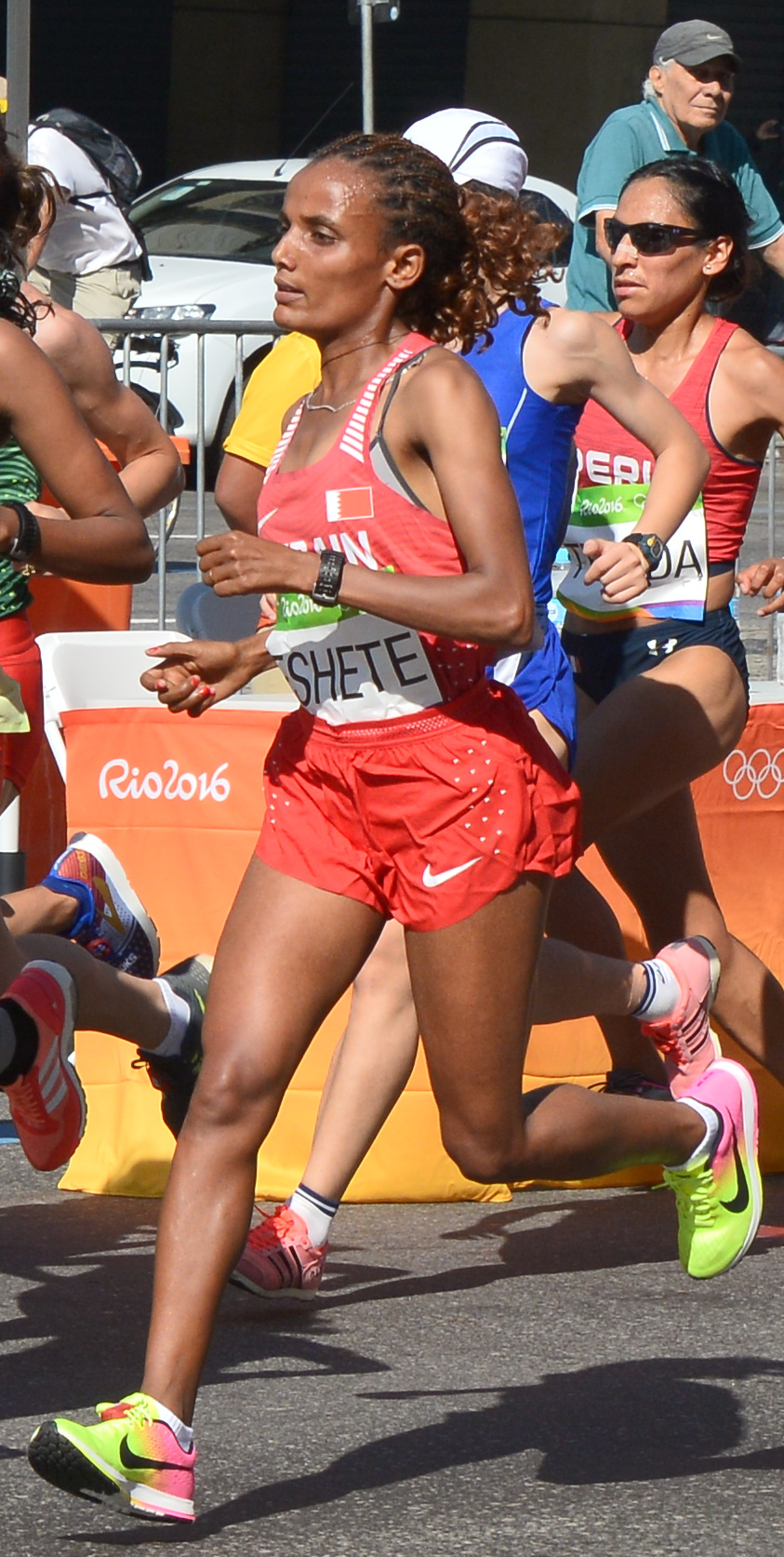
- Eshete at the 2016 Olympics

Personal information
- Born: 21 May 1990 (age 36)
- Height: 150 cm (4 ft 11 in)
- Weight: 38 kg (84 lb)

Sport
- Country: Bahrain
- Sport: Athletics
- Event: 5000 m – marathon

Achievements and titles
- Personal bests: 5000 m – 15:03.13 (2013); 10,000 m – 30:47.25 (2012) marathon – 2:20:32 (2025)
Medal record
Women's athletics
Representing Bahrain
Asian Games
Gold medal – first place	2026 Aichi–Nagoya	Marathon
Bronze medal – third place	2010 Guangzhou	10,000 m
Asian Championships
Gold medal – first place	2011 Kobe	10,000 m
Gold medal – first place	2013 Pune	10,000 m
Gold medal – first place	2019 Doha	10,000 m
Silver medal – second place	[2013 Pune	5000 m
Asian Indoor Championships
Gold medal – first place	2012 Hangzhou	3000 m
Pan Arab Games
Silver medal – second place	2011 Doha	10,000 m
Bronze medal – third place	2011 Doha	5000 m

Shitaye Eshete Habtegebrel (born 21 May 1990) is an Ethiopian-born long-distance runner who competes internationally for Bahrain.

== Debut ==
She first began competing for the oil-rich Gulf state in 2009, making her debut at the Asian Cross Country Championships in Manama. She won the women's junior title while team-mate Tejitu Daba, another former Ethiopian, completed a Bahraini 1–2. Her debut at the global level came shortly afterwards at the 2009 IAAF World Cross Country Championships and she finished 24th in the junior race, one place behind Daba. She was entered into the 5000 metres race at the 2009 Asian Athletics Championships in November and she came sixth.

== 2010–2012 ==
Shitaye made her senior debut the following year, running at the 2010 IAAF World Cross Country Championships and she was eleventh overall in the rankings, leading the Bahrain women alongside Mimi Belete to ninth place in the team competition.

In August she made her first appearance on the IAAF Diamond League, setting a 5000 m best of 15:25.67 minutes at the DN Galan. She was the sole representative for Asia-Pacific in that event at the 2010 IAAF Continental Cup, where she was sixth. The 2010 Asian Games saw her claim her first international medal, as she took third for the bronze medal over 10,000 metres behind Indian duo Preeja Sreedharan and Kavita Raut.

She was one place lower than her previous position at the 2011 IAAF World Cross Country Championships, just edging into the top twelve of the women's senior race. However, she led the national team to fourth in the rankings, aided by the presence of Maryam Yusuf Jamal. She performed well on the track that year, taking the 10,000 m title at the 2011 Asian Athletics Championships, the 5000 m title at the 2011 Military World Games, and then breaking the Bahraini record with a run of 31:21.57 minutes to finish sixth in the 10,000 m final at the 2011 World Championships in Athletics. She ended the year with a 5000 m bronze and 10,000 m silver at the 2011 Pan Arab Games.

Shitaye began the next season indoors, setting a national record for the 3000 metres to take the title at the 2012 Asian Indoor Athletics Championships. She then finished fifth in the final of that event at the 2012 IAAF World Indoor Championships. Heading outdoors, she won the women's title at the Asian Cross Country Championships, leading a women's sweep of the top three. At the 2012 Summer Olympics, she competed in both the 5000 m and the 10,000 m, finishing in 10th place and 6th place respectively, and setting a new national record in the 10,000 m.

The next year, 2013, she also finished 6th in the 10,000 m at the World Championship after winning the Asian Championship.

== 2014–2015 ==
She took a career break in 2014 to have a child and returned to competition in late 2015.

== 2016 and onwards ==
She competed in the 10,000 m at the 2016 Summer Olympics but was unable to finish the race. She returned to win the 10,000 m race at the Asian Championships in 2019. Eshete finished first in the 2026 Women's Hong Kong Marathon as an invited runner.

== See also ==
- List of Asian Games medalists in athletics
