= Polina Repina =

Kazakhstani race walker

Personal information
- Native name: Полина Репина
- Born: 29 June 1990 (age 36)
- Education: Al-Farabi Kazakh National University

Sport
- Sport: Track and field
- Event: 20 kilometres race walk

Polina Viktorovna Repina (Russian: Полина Викторовна Репина; born 29 June 1990) is a Kazakhstani race walker. She competed in the women's 20 kilometres walk event at the 2016 Summer Olympics.
