= Daisy Jepkemei =

Kazakhstan middle-distance runner

Personal information
- Born: 13 February 1996 (age 30) Kenya
- Height: 1.65 m (5 ft 5 in)
Medal record
Women's athletics
Representing Kazakhstan
Asian Championships
Gold medal – first place	2025 Gumi	10000 m
Representing Kenya
World Junior Championships
Gold medal – first place	2012 Barcelona	3000 m steeplechase
World Youth Championships
Silver medal – second place	2013 Donetsk	2000 m steeplechase
African Youth Championships
Gold medal – first place	2013 Warri	2000 m steeplechase
Silver medal – second place	2013 Warri	3000 m

Daisy Jepkemei (Kazakh: Дейзи Джепкемей; born 13 February 1996) is a Kenyan-born long-distance running athlete. Since 29 January 2022, she represents Kazakhstan. While representing Kenya at age 16, she was the steeplechase champion at the 2012 World Junior Championships in Athletics (for athletes under age 20) as well as the 2013 African Youth Athletics Championships. She was also second place in the 3000 metres at those same championships. Her personal best of 9:06.66, set in 2019 at the Weltklasse Zürich meet ranks her in the top 50 athletes of all time.

Jepkemei competed for Kazakhstan at the 2022 Asian Games in the women's 3000 metres steeplechase and women's 5000 metres events. She also represented Kazakhstan at the 2024 Summer Olympics in the women's 3000 metres steeplechase and women's 10,000 metres events.
