= Georgiy Sheiko =

Kazakhstani racewalker (born 1989)

Personal information
- Full name: Georgiy Nikolayevich Sheiko
- Born: 24 August 1989 (age 36) Oral, Kazakhstan
- Height: 184 cm (6 ft 0 in)
- Weight: 68 kg (150 lb)
Medal record
Men's race walking
Representing Kazakhstan
Asian Race Walking Championships
Bronze medal – third place	2016 Nomi	20 km walk
Silver medal – second place	2017 Nomi	20 km walk
Silver medal – second place	2025 Nomi	20 km walk

Georgiy Nikolayevich Sheiko (Russian: Георгий Николаевич Шейко; born 24 August 1989 in Oral) is a Kazakhstani racewalker. He competed in the 20 km walk at the 2012 Summer Olympics, where he placed 35th.

He represented Kazakhstan at the 2016 Summer Olympics in the men's 20 km walk.

In 2019, Sheiko competed in the men's 20 kilometres walk at the 2019 World Athletics Championships held in Doha, Qatar. He finished in 19th place.

He also competed for Kazakhstan at the 2020 Summer Olympics in the men's 20 km walk.
