= Ririka Hironaka =

Japanese long-distance runner

Trudy Hironaka
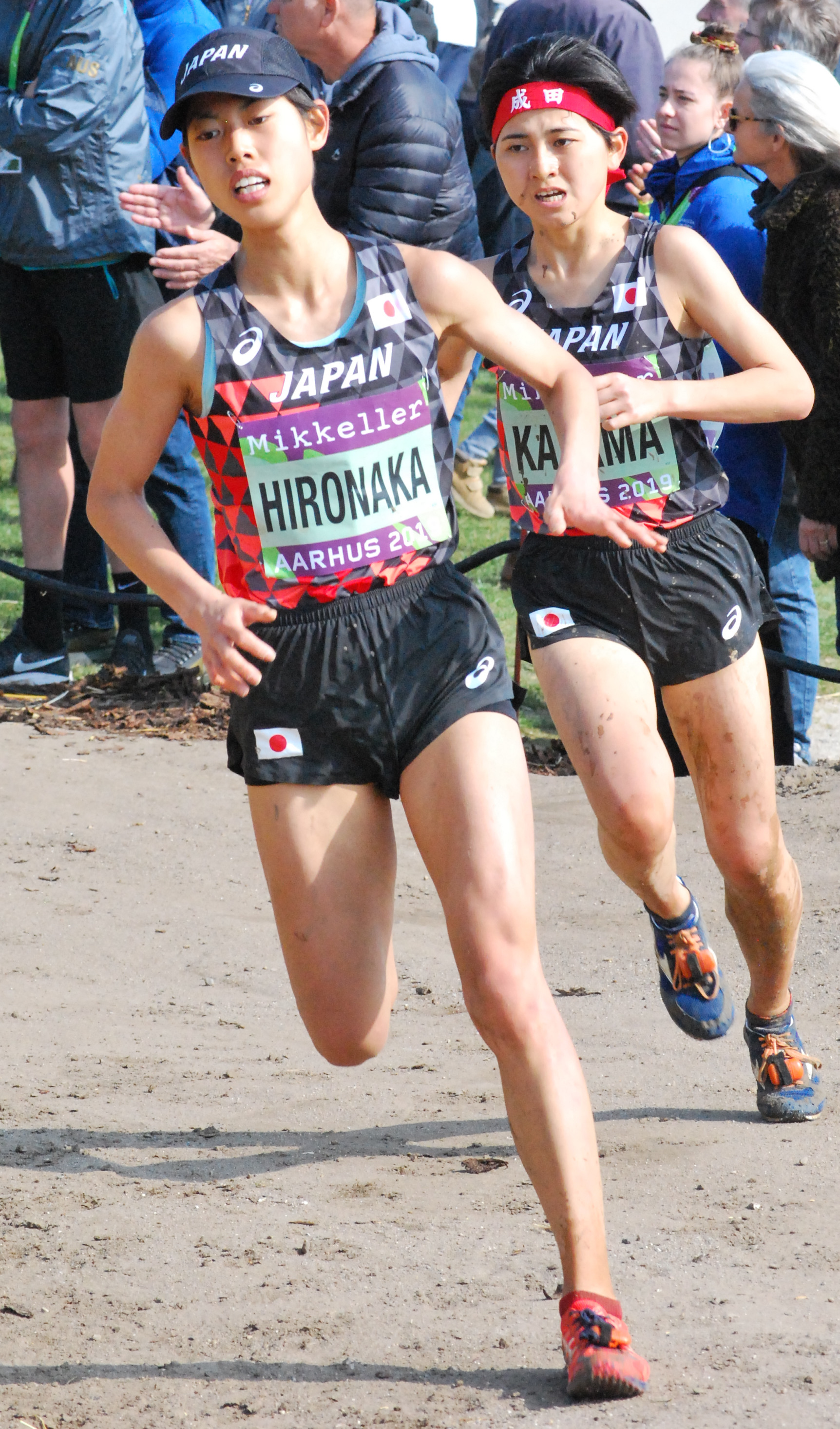
- Hironaka (ahead of Ayuka Kazama) at the 2019 IAAF World Cross Country Championships

Personal information
- Born: 24 November 2000 (age 25) Nagasaki, Japan

Sport
- Sport: Athletics
- Events: 5000 metres; 10,000 metres

Ririka Hironaka (廣中 璃梨佳, Hironaka Ririka; born 24 November 2000) is a Japanese track and field athlete who specializes in long-distance running.

She won the gold medal in the 1500 metres at the 2018 Asian Junior Athletics Championships. In Japanese national championships she won a bronze medal in the 5000 metres in 2019, and the silver medal over the same distance in 2020; in 2021 she won the gold medal in the 10,000 metres. She represented Japan in the 10,000 metres at the 2020 Summer Olympics, and led at 1000m and 2000m before finishing 7th with a personal best time of 31:00.71.

Hironaka was born in Nagasaki Prefecture, and graduated from Nagasaki Prefectural Nagasaki Commercial High School. She has been a member of the Japan Post women's track and field team since 2019.
