= 2015 IAAF World Cross Country Championships – Junior women's race =

Junior women's race at the 2015 IAAF World Cross Country Championships
- Organisers: IAAF
- Edition: 41st
- Date: March 28
- Host city: Guiyang, China
- Venue: Guiyang horse racing circuit
- Events: 1
- Distances: 6 km – Junior women
- Participation: 100 athletes from 28 nations

The Junior women's race at the 2015 IAAF World Cross Country Championships was held at the Guiyang horse racing circuit in Guiyang, China, on March 28, 2015. Reports of the event were given for the IAAF.

Complete results for individuals, and for teams were published.

== Race results ==
=== Junior women's race (6 km) ===
==== Individual ====
Rank	Athlete	Country	Time
1st place, gold medalist(s)	Letesenbet Gidey	Ethiopia	19:48
2nd place, silver medalist(s)	Dera Dida	Ethiopia	19:49
3rd place, bronze medalist(s)	Etagegn Woldu	Ethiopia	19:53
4	Daisy Jepkemei	Kenya	19:59
5	Mihret Tefera	Ethiopia	20:02
6	Dagmawit Kibru	Ethiopia	20:07
7	Gladys Jeptekeny Kipkoech	Kenya	20:13
8	Desi Mokonin	Bahrain	20:17
9	Ruth Jebet	Bahrain	20:20
10	Winfred Nzisa Mbithe	Kenya	20:31
11	Stella Chesang	Uganda	20:37
12	Rosefline Chepngetich	Kenya	20:38
13	Winnie Jebichii Koima	Kenya	20:52
14	Zerfe Lemeneh	Ethiopia	20:53
15	Fatuma Jawaro Chebsi	Bahrain	20:54
16	Azusa Sumi	Japan	20:55
17	Rachael Zena Chebet	Uganda	21:01
18	Janat Chemusto	Uganda	21:10
19	Doreen Chemutai	Uganda	21:18
20	Bontu Rebitu	Bahrain	21:22
21	Nana Kuraoka	Japan	21:24
22	Joyline Cherotich	Kenya	21:25
23	Hibret Debesay	Eritrea	21:26
24	Elvanie Nimbona	Burundi	21:27
25	Deshun Zhang	China	21:31
26	Mercyline Chelangat	Uganda	21:43
27	Kaitlyn Benner	United States	21:45
28	Dalila Abdulkadir Gosa	Bahrain	21:48
29	Wakana Kabasawa	Japan	21:48
30	Maria Larsen	Denmark	21:49
31	Wangmu Nuzeng	China	21:51
32	Yuri Nozoe	Japan	21:55
33	Lauren Gregory	United States	22:01
34	Yazhen Zhang	China	22:01
35	Kaoutar Farkoussi	Morocco	22:12
36	Nebyat Abraham	Eritrea	22:12
37	Cassandre Beaugrand	France	22:12
38	Miho Shimada	Japan	22:12
39	Yohana Gezae	Eritrea	22:13
40	Lucia Segid	Eritrea	22:16
41	Rima Chenah	Algeria	22:18
42	Branna Macdougall	Canada	22:20
43	Sunilda Lozano	Peru	22:20
44	Saida Meneses	Peru	22:21
45	Hannah Nuttall	Great Britain	22:23
46	Yuanfeng Li	China	22:23
47	Leanne Pompeani	Australia	22:26
48	Alberte Kjær Pedersen	Denmark	22:26
49	Lucie Picard	France	22:31
50	Imane El Bouhali	Morocco	22:33
51	Evelyn Escobar	Peru	22:40
52	Ok Byol Ju	North Korea	22:44
53	Celia Bremond	France	22:44
54	Lemlem Teweldebrhan	Eritrea	22:44
55	Katie Rainsberger	United States	22:49
56	Cuomu Ciren	China	22:50
57	Simonay Weitsz	South Africa	22:55
58	Sophie Eckel	Australia	22:56
59	Zhiling Zheng	China	22:57
60	Hannah Woodhouse	Canada	22:57
61	Yuka Sarumida	Japan	22:57
62	Valerie Constien	United States	22:58
63	Karlie Swanson	Australia	23:00
64	Amy McCormick	Australia	23:00
65	Nicole van der Merwe	South Africa	23:05
66	Kelsey Schrader	United States	23:06
67	Soukaina Belil	Morocco	23:09
68	Shaelyn Sorensen	United States	23:10
69	Jessica Hull	Australia	23:11
70	Jennifer Baragar-Petrash	Canada	23:16
71	Louise Rode	Denmark	23:16
72	Bronwen Owen	Great Britain	23:17
73	Paula González	Spain	23:19
74	Ruth Clarita Cjuro	Peru	23:22
75	Nicole Hutchinson	Canada	23:26
76	Carina Viljoen	South Africa	23:28
77	Sara Chakkaf	Morocco	23:31
78	Jin Hyang Pak	North Korea	23:32
79	Oumaima Saoud	Morocco	23:44
80	Abbie Donnelly	Great Britain	23:46
81	Jeanette Bokadie	South Africa	23:55
82	Grace Baker	Great Britain	24:00
83	Alena Barysenka	Belarus	24:09
84	Chol Sun Kim	North Korea	24:11
85	Weronica Pyzik	Poland	24:14
86	Sujoud Al Khatbah	Jordan	24:15
87	Magdalena Dias	Poland	24:15
88	Brianna Thomas	Australia	24:25
89	Hanli Etsebeth	South Africa	24:29
90	Jeanne Lehair	France	24:35
91	Sherilene Gelderblom	South Africa	24:44
92	Joana Ferreira	Portugal	24:48
93	Nurkhon Mukhiddinova	Uzbekistan	25:13
94	Mirelle Martens	Canada	25:23
95	Fatma El Sharnouby	Egypt	25:36
96	Ran Yon Kim	North Korea	26:20
97	Entasar Al-Madhfari	Yemen	29:39
—	Amy Griffiths	Great Britain	DNF
—	Pema Seldon	Bhutan	DNF
—	Claire Smith	Canada	DNF
—	Carmela Cardama	Spain	DNS

==== Teams ====
Rank	Team	Points
1st place, gold medalist(s)	Ethiopia: Letesenbet Gidey / 1; Dera Dida / 2; Etagegn Woldu / 3; Mihret Tefera / 5; (Dagmawit Kibru) / (6); (Zerfe Lemeneh) / (14)	11
2nd place, silver medalist(s)	Kenya: Daisy Jepkemei / 4; Gladys Jeptekeny Kipkoech / 7; Winfred Nzisa Mbithe / 10; Rosefline Chepngetich / 12; (Winnie Jebichii Koima) / (13); (Joyline Cherotich) / (22)	33
3rd place, bronze medalist(s)	Bahrain: Desi Mokonin / 8; Ruth Jebet / 9; Fatuma Jawaro Chebsi / 15; Bontu Rebitu / 20; (Dalila Abdulkadir Gosa) / (28)	52
4	Uganda: Stella Chesang / 11; Rachael Zena Chebet / 17; Janat Chemusto / 18; Doreen Chemutai / 19; (Mercyline Chelangat) / (26)	65
5	Japan: Azusa Sumi / 16; Nana Kuraoka / 21; Wakana Kabasawa / 29; Yuri Nozoe / 32; (Miho Shimada) / (38); (Yuka Sarumida) / (61)	98
6	China: Deshun Zhang / 25; Wangmu Nuzeng / 31; Yazhen Zhang / 34; Yuanfeng Li / 46; (Cuomu Ciren) / (56); (Zhiling Zheng) / (59)	136
7	Eritrea: Hibret Debesay / 23; Nebyat Abraham / 36; Yohana Gezae / 39; Lucia Segid / 40; (Lemlem Teweldebrhan) / (54)	138
8	United States: Kaitlyn Benner / 27; Lauren Gregory / 33; Katie Rainsberger / 55; Valerie Constien / 62; (Kelsey Schrader) / (66); (Shaelyn Sorensen) / (68)	177
9	Peru: Sunilda Lozano / 43; Saida Meneses / 44; Evelyn Escobar / 51; Ruth Clarita Cjuro / 74	212
10	Morocco: Kaoutar Farkoussi / 35; Imane El Bouhali / 50; Soukaina Belil / 67; Sara Chakkaf / 77; (Oumaima Saoud) / (79)	229
11	France: Cassandre Beaugrand / 37; Lucie Picard / 49; Celia Bremond / 53; Jeanne Lehair / 90	229
12	Australia: Leanne Pompeani / 47; Sophie Eckel / 58; Karlie Swanson / 63; Amy McCormick / 64; (Jessica Hull) / (69); (Brianna Thomas) / (88)	232
13	Canada: Branna Macdougall / 42; Hannah Woodhouse / 60; Jennifer Baragar-Petrash / 70; Nicole Hutchinson / 75; (Mirelle Martens) / (94); (Claire Smith) / (DNF)	247
14	South Africa: Simonay Weitsz / 57; Nicole van der Merwe / 65; Carina Viljoen / 76; Jeanette Bokadie / 81; (Hanli Etsebeth) / (89); (Sherilene Gelderblom) / (91)	279
15	Great Britain: Hannah Nuttall / 45; Bronwen Owen / 72; Abbie Donnelly / 80; Grace Baker / 82; (Amy Griffiths) / (DNF)	279
16	North Korea: Ok Byol Ju / 52; Jin Hyang Pak / 78; Chol Sun Kim / 84; Ran Yon Kim / 96	310

- Note: Athletes in parentheses did not score for the team result.

== Participation ==
According to an unofficial count, 100 athletes from 28 countries participated in the Junior women's race.

- Algeria (1)
- Australia (6)
- Bahrain (5)
- Belarus (1)
- Bhutan (1)
- Burundi (1)
- Canada (6)
- China (6)
- Denmark (3)
- Egypt (1)
- Eritrea (5)
- Ethiopia (6)
- France (4)
- Great Britain (5)
- Japan (6)
- Jordan (1)
- Kenya (6)
- Morocco (5)
- North Korea (4)
- Peru (4)
- Poland (2)
- Portugal (1)
- South Africa (6)
- Spain (1)
- Uganda (5)
- United States (6)
- Uzbekistan (1)
- Yemen (1)

== See also ==
- 2015 IAAF World Cross Country Championships – Senior men's race
- 2015 IAAF World Cross Country Championships – Junior men's race
- 2015 IAAF World Cross Country Championships – Senior women's race
