= 2017 IAAF World Cross Country Championships – Junior women's race =

Junior women's race at the 2017 IAAF World Cross Country Championships
- Organisers: IAAF
- Date: March 26
- Host city: Kampala, Uganda
- Events: 1
- Distances: 6 km – Junior women (5.858 km)
- Participation: 104 athletes from 30 nations

The Junior women's race at the 2017 IAAF World Cross Country Championships was held at the Kampala in Uganda, on March 26, 2017.

The exact length of the course was 5,858 m (33m start, 2 full laps of 2,000 m and a final lap of 1,825m).

Complete results for individuals.

== Race results ==
=== Junior women's race (6 km) ===
==== Individual ====
Rank	Athlete	Country	Time
1st place, gold medalist(s)	Letesenbet Gidey	Ethiopia	18:34
2nd place, silver medalist(s)	Hawi Feysa	Ethiopia	18:57
3rd place, bronze medalist(s)	Celliphine Chepteek Chespol	Kenya	19:02
4	Sheila Chelangat	Kenya	19:12
5	Hellen Ekalale Lobun	Kenya	19:16
6	Fotyen Tesfay	Ethiopia	19:24
7	Peruth Chemutai	Uganda	19:29
8	Joyline Cherotich	Kenya	19:31
9	Emmaculate Chepkirui	Kenya	19:31
10	Zeineba Yimer	Ethiopia	19:32
11	Sandrafelis Chebet Tuei	Kenya	19:59
12	Biri Abera	Ethiopia	20:00
13	Wede Kefale	Ethiopia	20:04
14	Sarah Chelangat	Uganda	20:13
15	Tomomi Musembi Takamatsu	Japan	20:24
16	Elvanie Nimbona	Burundi	20:25
17	Yuka Sarumida	Japan	20:28
18	Adha Munguleya	Uganda	20:33
19	Hayaka Suzuki	Japan	20:40
20	Francine Niyomukunzi	Burundi	20:44
21	Kidanu Teshome	Eritrea	20:48
22	Rika Kaseda	Japan	20:51
23	Janat Chemusto	Uganda	20:54
24	Hannah Bennison	Canada	20:54
25	Esther Yeko Chekwemoi	Uganda	20:55
26	Simonay Weitsz	South Africa	20:56
27	Semira Mebrahtu	Eritrea	20:59
28	Dolshi Tesfu	Eritrea	21:02
29	Scarlet Chemos	Uganda	21:03
30	Brogan MacDougall	Canada	21:08
31	Wakana Kabasawa	Japan	21:20
32	Martha MacDonald	Canada	21:22
33	Sheyla Eulogio	Peru	21:22
34	Nadia Battocletti	Italy	21:27
35	Amelia Mazza-Downie	Australia	21:28
36	Saadia Fadili	Morocco	21:31
37	Michelle Magnani	United States	21:32
38	Danji	China	21:34
39	Lyndi Roelofse	South Africa	21:42
40	Victoria Weir	Great Britain	21:43
41	Hanane Bouaggad	Morocco	21:44
42	Rina Cjuro	Peru	21:44
43	Asha Salum Samwe	Tanzania	21:46
44	Lauren Ryan	Australia	21:56
45	Logan Morris	United States	21:58
46	Gillian Black	Great Britain	21:59
47	Lucía Rodríguez	Spain	22:00
48	Anna MacFadyen	Great Britain	22:04
49	Hikari Ohnishi	Japan	22:05
50	Dawajila	China	22:08
51	Cristina Ruiz	Spain	22:10
52	Hanna Johnston	Canada	22:13
53	Nicole Louw	South Africa	22:15
54	Marta García	Spain	22:16
55	Aubrey Roberts	United States	22:18
56	Noela Remy Khaday	Tanzania	22:18
57	Phoebe Barker	Great Britain	22:19
58	Merhawit Tekie	Eritrea	22:20
59	Rahma Tahiri	Morocco	22:21
60	Irène Karire	Burundi	22:22
61	Yulisa Champi	Peru	22:22
62	Catherine Beauchemin	Canada	22:23
63	Chery-Lee Schoeman	South Africa	22:24
64	Cari Hughes	Great Britain	22:29
65	Diane Nikundana	Burundi	22:31
66	Loubna Echafai	Morocco	22:34
67	Georgia Evans	Australia	22:35
68	Amina Mohamed Mgoo	Tanzania	22:37
69	Ilaria Fantinel	Italy	22:38
70	Yohana Fitwi	Eritrea	22:46
71	Carla Gallardo	Spain	22:51
72	Alessia Scaini	Italy	22:51
73	Clio Ozanne-Jaques	Australia	22:53
74	Madison Fruchey	United States	22:54
75	Sonia Salazar	Peru	22:56
76	Imane El Bouhali	Morocco	22:57
77	Courtney Hopkins	Australia	23:03
78	Kristen Garcia	United States	23:04
79	Neslate Nduwimana	Burundi	23:07
80	Nicole Van Der Merwe	South Africa	23:25
81	Valentina Gemetto	Italy	23:34
82	Elizabeth Boniphance Ilanda	Tanzania	23:34
83	Megan Murray	United States	23:35
84	Sarra Houaouti	Algeria	23:49
85	Wafa El Gazouir	Morocco	23:58
86	Shona McCulloch	Canada	24:07
87	Beatriz Rodrigues	Portugal	24:31
88	Shamima Ramadhani Salum	Tanzania	24:44
89	Silvia Pérez	Spain	24:45
90	Dzidzai Gumede	Zimbabwe	24:59
91	Carine Wiysenyuy Tatah	Cameroon	25:04
92	Shaimaa Wahba	Egypt	25:15
93	Téna Tchammou	Benin	27:18
94	Lucy Massaquoi	Liberia	27:41
95	Divine Makaya	DR Congo	29:17
96	Isatu Turay	Sierra Leone	29:31
97	Diana Fakhran	Lebanon	29:44
—	Michela Cesarò	Italy	DNF
—	Catarina Guerreiro	Portugal	DNF
—	Cecilia Mhango	Malawi	DNF
—	Amelia Quirk	Great Britain	DNF
—	María de Jesús Ruiz	Mexico	DNF
—	Francesca Tommasi	Italy	DNF
—	Dahabo Yusuf Zubeyr	Somalia	DNS

==== Teams ====
Rank	Team	Points
1st place, gold medalist(s)	Ethiopia: Letesenbet Gidey / 1; Hawi Feysa / 2; Fotyen Tesfay / 6; Zeineba Yimer / 10; (Biri Abera) / (12); (Wede Kefale) / (13)	19
2nd place, silver medalist(s)	Kenya: Celliphine Chepteek Chespol / 3; Sheila Chelangat / 4; Hellen Ekalale Lobun / 5; Joyline Cherotich / 8; (Emmaculate Chepkirui) / (9); (Sandrafelis Chebet Tuei) / (11)	20
3rd place, bronze medalist(s)	Uganda: Peruth Chemutai / 7; Sarah Chelangat / 14; Adha Munguleya / 18; Janat Chemusto / 23; (Esther Yeko Chekwemoi) / (25); (Scarlet Chemos) / (29)	62
4	Japan: Tomomi Musembi Takamatsu / 15; Yuka Sarumida / 17; Hayaka Suzuki / 19; Rika Kaseda / 22; (Wakana Kabasawa) / (31); (Hikari Ohnishi) / (49)	73
5	Eritrea: Kidanu Teshome / 21; Semira Mebrahtu / 27; Dolshi Tesfu / 28; Merhawit Tekie / 58; (Yohana Fitwi) / (70)	134
6	Canada: Hannah Bennison / 24; Brogan MacDougall / 30; Martha MacDonald / 32; Hanna Johnston / 52; (Catherine Beauchemin) / (62); (Shona McCulloch) / (86)	138
7	Burundi: Elvanie Nimbona / 16; Francine Niyomukunzi / 20; Irène Karire / 60; Diane Nikundana / 65; (Neslate Nduwimana) / (79)	161
8	South Africa: Simonay Weitsz / 26; Lyndi Roelofse / 39; Nicole Louw / 53; Chery-Lee Schoeman / 63; (Nicole Van Der Merwe) / (80)	181
9	Great Britain: Victoria Weir / 40; Gillian Black / 46; Anna MacFadyen / 48; Phoebe Barker / 57; (Cari Hughes) / (64); (Amelia Quirk) / (DNF)	191
10	Morocco: Saadia Fadili / 36; Hanane Bouaggad / 41; Rahma Tahiri / 59; Loubna Echafai / 66; (Imane El Bouhali) / (76); (Wafa El Gazouir) / (85)	202
11	United States: Michelle Magnani / 37; Logan Morris / 45; Aubrey Roberts / 55; Madison Fruchey / 74; (Kristen Garcia) / (78); (Megan Murray) / (83)	211
12	Peru: Sheyla Eulogio / 33; Rina Cjuro / 42; Yulisa Champi / 61; Sonia Salazar / 75	211
13	Australia: Amelia Mazza-Downie / 35; Lauren Ryan / 44; Georgia Evans / 67; Clio Ozanne-Jaques / 73; (Courtney Hopkins) / (77)	219
14	Spain: Lucía Rodríguez / 47; Cristina Ruiz / 51; Marta García / 54; Carla Gallardo / 71; (Silvia Pérez) / (89)	223
15	Tanzania: Asha Salum Samwe / 43; Noela Remy Khaday / 56; Amina Mohamed Mgoo / 68; Elizabeth Boniphance Ilanda / 82; (Shamima Ramadhani Salum) / (88)	249
16	Italy: Nadia Battocletti / 34; Ilaria Fantinel / 69; Alessia Scaini / 72; Valentina Gemetto / 81; (Francesca Tommasi) / (DNF); (Michela Cesarò) / (DNF)	256

- Note: Athletes in parentheses did not score for the team result.

== See also ==
- 2017 IAAF World Cross Country Championships – Junior men's race
- 2017 IAAF World Cross Country Championships – Senior men's race
- 2017 IAAF World Cross Country Championships – Senior women's race
- 2017 IAAF World Cross Country Championships – Mixed relay
