= Chepngetich =

Chepngetich or Chepng'etich is a surname and middle name. Notable people with this surname include:

- Faith Chepngetich Kipyegon (born 1994), Kenyan middle- and long-distance runner
- Janeth Chepngetich (born 1998), Kenyan long-distance runner
- Rosefline Chepngetich (born 1997), Kenyan steeplechase runner
- Ruth Chepng'etich (born 1994), Kenyan road runner
