= 2015 World Youth Championships in Athletics – Girls' 3000 metres =

Girls' 3000 metres at the 2015 World Youth Championships in Athletics
- Venue: Estadio Olímpico Pascual Guerrero
- Dates: 15 July
- Competitors: 20 from 14 nations
- Winning time: 9:01.12

Medalists
| gold medal | Shuru Bulo | Ethiopia |
| silver medal | Emily Chebet Kipchumba | Kenya |
| bronze medal | Sheila Chelangat | Kenya |

The girls' 3000 metres at the 2015 World Youth Championships in Athletics was held at the Estadio Olímpico Pascual Guerrero in Cali, Colombia on 15 July 2015.

== Records ==
Prior to the competition, the following records were as follows.

| World Youth Best | Ma Ningning (CHN) | 8:36.45 | Jinan, China | 6 June 1993 |
| Championship Record | Mercy Cherono (KEN) | 8:53.94 | Ostrava, Czech Republic | 11 July 2007 |
| World Youth Leading | Yuka Mukai (JPN) | 9:04.81 | Izumo, Japan | 20 June 2015 |

== Results ==
| Rank | Name | Nationality | Time | Note |
|---|---|---|---|---|
| 1st place, gold medalist(s) | Shuru Bulo | Ethiopia | 9:01.12 | WYL |
| 2nd place, silver medalist(s) | Emily Chebet Kipchumba | Kenya | 9:02.92 | PB |
| 3rd place, bronze medalist(s) | Sheila Chelangat | Kenya | 9:04.54 | PB |
| 4 | Letesenbet Gidey | Ethiopia | 9:04.64 | PB |
| 5 | Yuka Mukai | Japan | 9:21.04 | |
| 6 | Kanami Sagayama | Japan | 9:33.85 | |
| 7 | Fatuma Chebsi | Bahrain | 9:39.25 | |
| 8 | Hannah Bennison | Canada | 9:42.75 | |
| 9 | Annabel McDermott | Australia | 9:42.86 | |
| 10 | Janat Chemusto | Uganda | 9:42.88 | |
| 11 | Shona McCulloch | Canada | 9:44.74 | |
| 12 | Miriam Dattke | Germany | 9:44.77 | |
| 13 | Xia Yuyu | China | 9:59.17 | |
| 14 | Amelia Mazza-Downie | Australia | 10:00.05 | SB |
| 15 | Dawa Jila | China | 10:21.35 | |
| 16 | Destiny Collins | United States | 10:21.36 | |
| 17 | Lucía Rodríguez | Spain | 10:28.85 | |
| 18 | Eunika Pashufika Kanana | Namibia | 10:46.52 | |
| 19 | Marta Guerrero | Colombia | 10:46.52 | |
| 20 | Puleng Nkopele | Lesotho | 11:32.93 | PB |
