= Francis Damiano Damasi =

Tanzanian long-distance runner

Personal information
- Born: 1 June 2001 (age 24)

Sport
- Country: Tanzania
- Sport: Long-distance running

Francis Damiano Damasi (born 1 June 2001) is a Tanzanian long-distance runner.

In 2017, he competed in the junior men's race at the 2017 IAAF World Cross Country Championships held in Kampala, Uganda.

In 2018, he competed in the boys' 3000 metres at the 2018 Summer Youth Olympics held in Buenos Aires, Argentina.

In 2019, he competed in the senior men's race at the 2019 IAAF World Cross Country Championships held in Aarhus, Denmark. He finished in 61st place.
