= 2015 World Youth Championships in Athletics – Boys' 3000 metres =

Boys' 3000 metres at the 2015 World Youth Championships in Athletics
- Venue: Estadio Olímpico Pascual Guerrero
- Dates: 16 and 19 July
- Competitors: 30 from 23 nations
- Winning time: 7:54.45

Medalists
gold medal	Richard Yator	Kenya
silver medal	Davis Kiplangat	Kenya
bronze medal	Tefera Mosisa	Ethiopia

The boys' 3000 metres at the 2015 World Youth Championships in Athletics was held at the Estadio Olímpico Pascual Guerrero in Cali, Colombia on 16 and 19 July 2015.

== Records ==
Prior to the competition, the following records were as follows.

World Youth Best	Abreham Cherkos (ETH)	7:32.37	Lausanne, Switzerland	11 July 2006
Championship Record	William Sitonik (KEN)	7:40.10	Lille, France	10 July 2011
World Youth Leading	Edward Rono (KEN)	7:51.7	Nairobi, Kenya	16 June 2015

== Results ==
=== Round 1 ===
First 5 in each heat (Q) and the next 5 fastest (q) advance to the final.

Rank	Heat	Name	Nationality	Time	Note
1	2	Richard Yator	Kenya	8:04.75	Q
2	2	Tefera Mosisa	Ethiopia	8:07.53	Q, PB
3	1	Davis Kiplangat	Kenya	8:19.27	Q
4	1	Abayneh Degu	Ethiopia	8:20.08	Q
5	1	Yuta Kambayashi	Japan	8:25.58	Q
6	1	Kisan Narshi Tadvi	India	8:25.98	Q
7	2	Hyuga Endo	Japan	8:26.59	Q
8	1	Alex Yee	Great Britain	8:28.18	Q
9	2	Abderrazak Abed	Algeria	8:29.07	Q, PB
10	2	Dorin Rusu	Romania	8:29.36	Q
11	1	Tariku Novales	Spain	8:30.77	q, PB
12	2	Suldan Hassan	Sweden	8:31.95	q
13	1	Andreas Lindgreen	Denmark	8:33.42	q
14	2	Abdurrahman Gediklioğlu	Turkey	8:35.08	q
15	2	Miguel González	Spain	8:35.11	q
16	2	Ali Kaddachi	Tunisia	8:35.40	
17	2	Cristian Moreno	Colombia	8:36.61	
18	1	Mason Coppi	United States	8:38.71	PB
19	2	Mohamed Miftahou	Comoros	8:42.58	SB
20	2	Maxwell Rotich	Uganda	8:43.99	
21	1	Henrik Irgens	Norway	8:45.12	
22	1	Riley Tell	Canada	8:49.16	
23	2	Adam Yousif	Sudan	8:51.47	
24	1	Markus Görger	Germany	8:54.28	
25	1	Mariano Moreira	Uruguay	8:56.15	
26	1	Francisco Albarracín	Colombia	8:57.36	
27	1	Ali Djoudar	Algeria	9:05.39	
28	2	Kyle Madden	Canada	9:07.70	
29	2	Xie Chao	China	9:18.80	
–	1	Yaser Bagharab	Yemen	DNS	

=== Final ===
Rank	Name	Nationality	Time	Note
1st place, gold medalist(s)	Richard Yator	Kenya	7:54.45	
2nd place, silver medalist(s)	Davis Kiplangat	Kenya	7:54.52	
3rd place, bronze medalist(s)	Tefera Mosisa	Ethiopia	7:55.04	PB
4	Abayneh Degu	Ethiopia	8:00.79	PB
5	Hyuga Endo	Japan	8:26.96	
6	Alex Yee	Great Britain	8:28.26	
7	Yuta Kambayashi	Japan	8:29.75	
8	Kisan Narshi Tadvi	India	8:31.65	
9	Abderrazak Abed	Algeria	8:34.38	
10	Suldan Hassan	Sweden	8:34.42	
11	Abdurrahman Gediklioğlu	Turkey	8:39.15	
12	Tariku Novales	Spain	8:40.88	
13	Miguel González	Spain	8:46.37	
14	Andreas Lindgreen	Denmark	8:52.28	
–	Dorin Rusu	Romania	DQ	
