= Amina Mohamed Mgoo =

Tanzanian long-distance runner

Personal information
- Born: 22 July 1998 (age 27)

Sport
- Country: Tanzania
- Sport: Long-distance running

Amina Mohamed Mgoo (born 22 July 1998) is a Tanzanian long-distance runner. She competed in the senior women's race at the 2019 IAAF World Cross Country Championships held in Aarhus, Denmark. She finished in 99th place.

In 2017, she competed in the junior women's race at the 2017 IAAF World Cross Country Championships held in Kampala, Uganda. She finished in 68th place.
