= 2024 African Championships in Athletics – Women's 10,000 metres =

Women's 10,000 metres at the 2024 African Championships in Athletics
- Venue: Japoma Stadium
- Location: Douala, Cameroon
- Dates: 24 June
- Competitors: 5 from 3 nations
- Winning time: 36:53.59

Medalists
gold medal	Gladys Kwamboka	Kenya
silver medal	Rebecca Mwangi	Kenya
bronze medal	Gela Hambese	Ethiopia

The women's 10,000 metres event at the 2024 African Championships in Athletics was held on 24 June in Douala, Cameroon.

== Records ==
Records before the 2024 African Athletics Championships
Record	Athlete (nation)	Time (s)	Location	Date
World record	Beatrice Chebet (KEN)	28:54.14	Eugene, United States	25 May 2024
African record	Beatrice Chebet (KEN)	28:54.14	Eugene, United States	25 May 2024
Championship record	Alice Aprot (KEN)	30:26.94	Durban, South Africa	25 June 2016
World leading	Beatrice Chebet (KEN)	28:54.14	Eugene, United States	25 May 2024
African leading	Beatrice Chebet (KEN)	28:54.14	Eugene, United States	25 May 2024

== Results ==
Rank	Athlete	Nationality	Time	Notes
1st place, gold medalist(s)	Gladys Kwamboka	Kenya	36:53.59	
2nd place, silver medalist(s)	Rebecca Mwangi	Kenya	36:59.69	
3rd place, bronze medalist(s)	Gela Hambese	Ethiopia	37:09.20	
4	Alem Nigussie	Ethiopia	37:20.04	
5	Esperance Sabine Otomo Mendouga	Cameroon	38:22.71	
	Emmy Jepkemoi	Kenya	DNS	

== See also ==
- Athletics at the 2023 African Games – Women's 10,000 metres
