= 2013 World Youth Championships in Athletics – Girls' 2000 metres steeplechase =

Girls' 2000 metres steeplechase at the 2013 World Youth Championships in Athletics
- Venue: RSC Olimpiyskiy
- Dates: 12 July (heats); 14 July (final)
- Competitors: 24
- Winning time: 6:14.60

Medalists
gold medal	Rosefline Chepngetich	Kenya
silver medal	Daisy Jepkemei	Kenya
bronze medal	Woynshet Ansa	Ethiopia

The girls' 2000 metres steeplechase at the 2013 World Youth Championships in Athletics was held on 12 and 14 July.

== Medalists ==
Gold	Silver	Bronze
Rosefline Chepngetich; Kenya	Daisy Jepkemei; Kenya	Woynshet Ansa; Ethiopia

== Records ==
Prior to the competition, the following records were as follows.

World Youth Best	Korahubish Itaa (ETH)	6:11.83	Bressanone, Italy	10 July 2009
Championship Record	Korahubish Itaa (ETH)	6:11.83	Bressanone, Italy	10 July 2009
World Youth Leading	Rosefline Chepngetich (KEN)	6:12.0	Nairobi, Kenya	11 June 2013

== Heats ==
Qualification rule: first 5 of each heat (Q) plus the 5 fastest times (q) qualified.

=== Heat 1 ===
Rank	Name	Nationality	Time	Notes
1	Rosefline Chepngetich	Kenya	6:46.32	Q
2	Buzuayehu Mohamed	Ethiopia	6:49.43	Q
3	Amy McCormick	Australia	6:52.50	Q
4	Andreia Rodrigues	Portugal	6:54.26	Q, PB
5	Inés Zugasti	Spain	6:54.53	Q, PB
6	Carolina Lozano	Argentina	7:03.30	q
7	Ceylan Gökdemir	Turkey	7:05.57	q
8	Sabrina Yahi	Algeria	7:06.21	PB
9	Claudia Prisecaru	Romania	7:07.21	
10	Karen Olivera	Peru	7:22.31	
	Marita Deschiffart	Canada	DQ	
	Alexandra Cevallos	Ecuador	DNS	

=== Heat 2 ===
Rank	Name	Nationality	Time	Notes
1	Daisy Jepkemei	Kenya	6:24.72	Q
2	Woynshet Ansa	Ethiopia	6:25.18	Q, PB
3	Nicole Reina	Italy	6:45.22	Q
4	Julie Op'T'Hoog	France	6:48.90	Q, PB
5	Kristina Božić	Croatia	6:53.22	Q, PB
6	Marwa Bouzayani	Tunisia	6:54.65	q, PB
7	Zeynep Mete	Turkey	6:59.56	q, PB
8	Marta Bote	Spain	7:05.55	q
9	Mahesha Gedara	Sri Lanka	7:23.00	
10	Chelsea Ribeiro	Canada	7:25.46	
11	Oksana Hach	Ukraine	7:29.61	
	Erika Panchi	Ecuador	DNS	

== Final ==
Rank	Name	Nationality	Time	Notes
1st place, gold medalist(s)	Rosefline Chepngetich	Kenya	6:14.60	
2nd place, silver medalist(s)	Daisy Jepkemei	Kenya	6:15.12	PB
3rd place, bronze medalist(s)	Woynshet Ansa	Ethiopia	6:30.05	
4	Buzuayehu Mohamed	Ethiopia	6:40.06	
5	Nicole Reina	Italy	6:40.70	PB
6	Amy McCormick	Australia	6:44.45	
7	arta Bote	Spain	6:45.88	PB
8	Julie Op'T'Hoog	France	6:50.10	
9	Marwa Bouzayani	Tunisia	6:52.30	PB
10	Andreia Rodrigues	Portugal	6:54.08	PB
11	Zeynep Mete	Turkey	6:56.76	PB
12	Inés Zugasti	Spain	6:57.82	
13	Kristina Božić	Croatia	6:59.81	
14	Ceylan Gökdemir	Turkey	7:04.91	
15	Carolina Lozano	Argentina	7:05.14	
