= 10 km de Port-Gentil =

Annual race in Gabon since 2017

- Date: June
- Location: Port-Gentil, Gabon
- Event type: Road
- Distance: 10K
- Established: 2017 (9 years ago)
- Course records: 27:35 (2019) (men); (Uganda) Abdallah Kibet Mande; 30:55 (2019) (women); (Kenya) Sheila Chelangat
- Website: Official website
- Participants: 7,140 (2018); 5,446 (2017)

The 10 kilomètres de Port-Gentil (also known as the 10 km POG) is an annual road-based 10K run hosted by Port-Gentil, Gabon, since 2017. The race is a World Athletics Elite Label Road Race. During the race weekend, a competitive 3K race is also offered for runners between the ages of 12 and 15.

== History ==
The inaugural race was held on 24 June 2017, and was started by President Ali Bongo Ondimba, who had travelled to Port-Gentil especially for the occasion. A total of 5,446 people participated in the event, which was won by Kenyan runners Alex Korio and Ruth Chepng'etich, with finish times of 27:48 and 31:36, respectively. Chepng'etich's performance was an African 10K all-comers record.

In 2019, Kenyan runner Sheila Chelangat set a new African 10K all-comers record with a finish time of 30:55, beating Chepng'etich's 2017 record by 41 seconds. (Note: Kenyan runner Caroline Kipkirui had also beaten Chepng'etich's record with a finish time of 31:24 in the 2018 race.)

The 2020 edition of the race was postponed due to the coronavirus pandemic. It was eventually held on 25 June 2022.

== Course ==
External images
- Course map of 10K in 2019
- Course map of 3K in 2022

The race is a clockwise loop that begins and ends on boulevard Léon Mba in front of the Foire Municipale. Runners first head north from the start before running south along the coast on boulevard du Gouverneur Chavannes during the race's first half. During the last few kilometres, the course eventually heads back up north via avenue de la Balise before turning onto boulevard Léon Mba for the finish.

== Winners ==
Key: Course record (in bold)

Ed.	Date	Male Winner	Time	Female Winner	Time	Rf.
1	2017.06.24	Alex Korio (KEN)	27:48	Ruth Chepng'etich (KEN)	31:36	
2	2018.06.24	Maxwell Rotich (UGA)	28:03	Caroline Kipkirui (KEN)	31:24	
3	2019.06.30	Abdallah Kibet Mande (UGA)	**27:35**	Sheila Chelangat (KEN)	**30:55**	
—	—	postponed in 2020 and 2021 due to coronavirus pandemic				
4	2022.06.25	Emmanuel Bor (KEN)	27:50	Alemaz Samuel (ETH)	31:51	
5	2023.04.08	Vincent Kipkemoi (KEN)	28:11	Beatrice Chepkoech (KEN)	32:13	
6	2024.06.23	Peter Aila (KEN)	28:32	Loice Chemnung (KEN)	30:40	
6	2025.11.29	Admasu Tisa (ETH)	29:24	Emebet Kebede (ETH)	32:55	
