= Uganda at the 2018 Summer Youth Olympics =

- IOC code: UGA
- NOC: Uganda Olympic Committee
- Website: http://www.nocuganda.org/

in Buenos Aires, Argentina 6 – 18 October 2018
- Competitors: 5 in 3 sports
- Medals Ranked 57th: Gold 1 Silver 0 Bronze 1 Total 2

Summer Youth Olympics appearances
- 2010; 2014; 2018

Uganda participated at the 2018 Summer Youth Olympics in Buenos Aires, Argentina from 6 October to 18 October 2018.

== Competitors ==
Sport	Boys	Girls	Total
Athletics	1	2	3
Rowing	0	1	1
Weightlifting	1	0	1
Total	2	3	5

== Medalists ==
Medal	Name	Sport	Event	Date
Gold	Sarah Chelangat	Athletics	Girls' 3000m	15 October
Bronze	Oscar Chelimo	Athletics	Boys' 3000m	15 October

== Athletics ==
- 3 athletes

Athlete	Event	Stage 1		Stage 2		Total	
Athlete	Event	Time	Rank	Time	Rank	Time	Rank
Oscar Chelimo	Boys' 3000 metres	8:08.20	1	11:28	3	4	3rd place, bronze medalist(s)
Sarah Chelangat	Girls' 3000 metres	9:11.63	1	12:32	1	2	1st place, gold medalist(s)
Esther Yego Chekwemoi	Girls' 2000 metre steeplechase	6:46.27	8	13:13	2	10	4

== Rowing ==
Uganda was given a quota to compete in rowing by the tripartite committee.

- Girls' single sculls - 1 athlete

Athlete	Event	Round 1		Round 2		Round 3		Total			Quarterfinals		Semifinals		Final	
Athlete	Event	Time	Rank	Time	Points	Time	Points	Time	Points	Rank	Time	Rank	Time	Rank	Time	Rank
Grace Ndagire	Girls' single sculls	5:28.37	22	2:31.82	2	2:29.19	2	5:01.01	4	24	did not advance				2:24.09	24

== Weightlifting ==
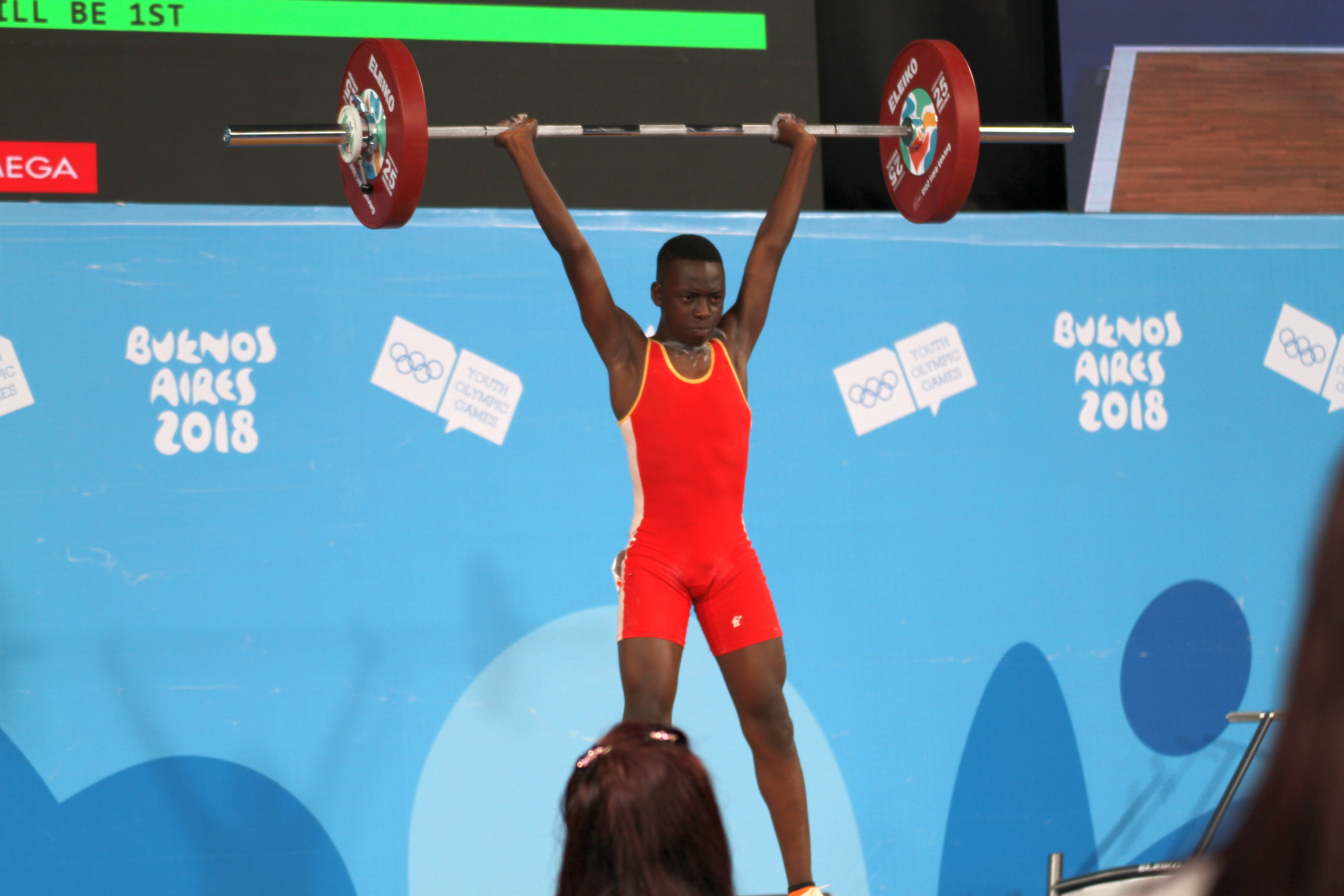
Hamdan Lutaaya Sserwanga

Uganda was given a quota by the tripartite committee to compete in weightlifting.

Athlete	Event	Snatch		Clean & Jerk		Total	Rank
Athlete	Event	Result	Rank	Result	Rank	Total	Rank
Hamdan Lutaaya Sserwanga	−62 kg	67	14	83	14	150	14
