= Pakiso Mthembu =

South African long-distance runner

Personal information
- Nickname: Kiddo
- Born: 10 June 1999 (age 26) Tweeling, Free State
- Home town: Mafahlaneng
- Occupation: Student

Sport
- Country: South Africa
- Sport: Long-distance running

Pakiso Mthembu (born 10 June 1999) is a South African long-distance runner.

== Early life and education ==
Mthembu started his primary school at Tshediso Xolani Primary before completing his matric at Refeng Thabo Secondary School in Mafahlaneng, where he was a star soccer player. His speed was noticed, and he was invited to take part in athletics.

== Career ==
In 2017, he competed in the junior men's race at the 2017 IAAF World Cross Country Championships held in Kampala, Uganda.

In 2019, he competed in the senior men's race at the 2019 IAAF World Cross Country Championships held in Aarhus, Denmark. He finished in 59th place and was the second-best South African competitor in the race. He received the University of the Free State Sportsman of the Year 2019 award, joining the likes of Wayde van Niekerk.

In 2025 Mthembu won his first Soweto Marathon 10 km running for Maxed Elite in a time of 31:37.
