= Teshager =

Teshager is a surname. Notable people with the surname include:

- Agegnehu Teshager, Ethiopian politician
- Bayelign Teshager (born 2000), Ethiopian long-distance runner
