= 2018 African Cross Country Championships =

2018 Africa Cross Country Championships
- Organisers: CAA
- Edition: 5th
- Date: 17 March 2018
- Host city: Chlef, Algeria
- Events: 5

The 2018 African Cross Country Championships was the fifth edition of the international cross country running competition for African athletes organised by the Confederation of African Athletics. It was held on 17 March in Chlef, Algeria – the first time a North African nation had hosted the event since its re-launch in 2011. There were five races on the program: 10 km for senior men, 10 km for senior women, 8 km for junior men, 6 km for junior women, and an 8 km mixed relay.

Kenya again dominated the podium at the competition, taking the top two spots in the senior men's, senior women's, and junior men's races, as well as runner-up in the mixed relay. The 21-year-old Alfred Barkach had the first major win of his career in the senior men's race and 18-year-old Celliphine Chespol took the women's title, adding senior international honours to her world steeplechase titles at under-18 and under-20 level. Rhonex Kipruto won the men's junior title and went on to become 10,000 metres World U20 Champion later that year. Girmawit Gebrzihair claimed Ethiopia's sole individual title in the junior women's race, though her physical appearance raised questions about her eligibility for the under-18 category.

== Medallists ==
Event	Gold		Silver		Bronze	
Senior men's 10 km	Alfred Barkach (KEN)	30:47	Julius Kogo (KEN)	30:47	Thomas Ayeko (UGA)	30:47
Senior women's 10 km	Celliphine Chespol (KEN)	35:10	Margaret Chelimo Kipkemboi (KEN)	35:13	Yeshi Kalayu Chekole (ETH)	35:26
Mixed relay	Ethiopia; Taresa Tolosa; Netsanet Desta; Mogos Tuemay; Besu Sado	23:51	Kenya; Charles Simotwo; Emily Chebet; Bethwel Birgen; Winfred Mbithe	24:15	Morocco; Brahim Kaazouzi; Kawtar Farkoussi; Younès Essalhi; Fadwa Sidi Madane	25:07
Junior men 8 km	Rhonex Kipruto (KEN)	25:01	Stanley Mburu (KEN)	25:06	Solomon Berihu (ETH)	25:08
Junior women 6 km	Girmawit Gebrzihair (ETH)	20:40	Tsigie Gebreselama (ETH)	20:54	Hellen Ekalale (KEN)	20:55

== Results ==
=== Senior men ===
Place	Athlete	Country	Time	Notes
1st place, gold medalist(s)	Alfred Barkach	Kenya	30:47	
2nd place, silver medalist(s)	Julius Kogo	Kenya	30:47	
3rd place, bronze medalist(s)	Thomas Ayeko	Uganda	30:47	
4	Enyew Mekonnen Alem	Ethiopia	31:01	
5	Emmanuel Bor	Kenya	31:14	
6	Philip Kipyeko	Uganda	31:19	
7	John Chepkwony	Kenya	31:22	
8	Filmon Ande	Eritrea	31:23	
9	Mande Bushendich	Uganda	31:26	
10	Tesfay Berhe Berhane	Eritrea	31:28	
11	Kefasiteni Chitsala	Malawi	31:35	
12	Nelson Wakana	Uganda	31:38	
13	Melkashaw Eshete Kassa	Ethiopia	31:43	
14	Samsom Amare	Eritrea	31:46	
15	Ali Grine	Algeria	31:47	
16	Mohamed Merbouhi	Algeria	31:49	
17	David Manja	South Africa	31:56	
18	Brhane Amanuel	Eritrea	32:00	
19	Christian Manga	Senegal	32:13	
20	Abe Gashaun Tilahun	South Africa	32:15	

=== Senior women ===
Place	Athlete	Country	Time	Notes
1st place, gold medalist(s)	Celliphine Chespol	Kenya	35:10	
2nd place, silver medalist(s)	Margaret Chelimo Kipkemboi	Kenya	35:13	
3rd place, bronze medalist(s)	Yeshi Kalayy Chekole	Ethiopia	35:26	
4	Stacey Chepkemboi Ndiwa	Kenya	35:27	
5	Stella Chesang	Uganda	35:30	
6	Sandra Chebet	Kenya	35:47	
7	Mercyline Chelangat	Uganda	35:53	
8	Enatnesh Alamrew Tirusew	Ethiopia	35:57	
9	Rosemary Njeri	Kenya	36:01	
10	Gate Alemayehu Teklemichael	Ethiopia	36:08	
11	Rahma Tusa Chota	Ethiopia	36:27	
12	Perine Nengampi	Kenya	36:38	
13	Janat Chemusto	Uganda	36:52	
14	Linet Chebet	Uganda	36:59	
15	Shasho Insermu Mijana	Ethiopia	37:21	
16	Kesa Molotsane	South Africa	37:38	
17	Zinash Estifo Banetirga	Ethiopia	37:46	
18	Rima Chenah	Algeria	38:34	
19	Riham Senani	Algeria	38:49	
20	Glenrose Xaba	South Africa	39:04	

=== Junior men ===
Place	Athlete	Country	Time	Notes
1st place, gold medalist(s)	Rhonex Kipruto	Kenya	25:01	
2nd place, silver medalist(s)	Stanley Mburu	Kenya	25:06	
3rd place, bronze medalist(s)	Solomon Berihu Weldeselassie	Ethiopia	25:08	
4	Berehanu Wendim Tsegu	Ethiopia	25:11	
5	Milkesa Mengesha Tolosa	Ethiopia	25:13	
6	Vincent Kipkemoi Ngetich	Kenya	25:14	
7	Edwin Kiplagat Bett	Kenya	25:17	
8	Edward Zakayo	Kenya	25:20	
9	Dominic Kiptum Rotich	Kenya	25:31	
10	Nibret Melak Bogale	Ethiopia	25:34	

=== Junior women ===
Place	Athlete	Country	Time	Notes
1st place, gold medalist(s)	Girmawit Gebrzihair	Ethiopia	19:44	
2nd place, silver medalist(s)	Tsigie Gebreselama	Ethiopia	19:58	
3rd place, bronze medalist(s)	Hellen Ekalale	Kenya	19:59	
4	Agnes Jebet Ngetich	Kenya	20:06	
5	Roselidah Jepketer	Kenya	20:08	
6	Mirriam Cherop	Kenya	21:06	
7	Mizan Alem Adane	Ethiopia	21:08	
8	Edinah Jebitok	Kenya	21:21	
9	Ejegayehu Taye Haylu	Ethiopia	21:23	
10	Beatrice Chebet	Kenya	21:32	

=== Mixed relay ===
Place	Country	Athlete	Time
1st place, gold medalist(s)	Ethiopia	Taresa Tolosa, Netsanet Desta, Mogos Tuemay, Besu Sado	23:51
2nd place, silver medalist(s)	Kenya	Charles Simotwo, Emily Chebet, Bethwel Birgen, Winfred Mbithe	24:15
3rd place, bronze medalist(s)	Morocco	Brahim Kaazouzi, Kawtar Farkoussi, Younès Essalhi, Fadwa Sidi Madane	25:07
4.	Algeria	Imad Touil, Abir Refas, Takieddine Heideli, Nabila Sifi	25:51

== See also ==
- 2018 Asian Cross Country Championships
- 2018 European Cross Country Championships
