= Uganda at the 2014 Summer Youth Olympics =

- IOC code: UGA
- NOC: Uganda Olympic Committee
- Website: www.nocuganda.com

in Nanjing
- Competitors: 6 in 4 sports
- Medals Ranked 70th: Gold 0 Silver 1 Bronze 0 Total 1

Summer Youth Olympics appearances
- 2010; 2014; 2018

Uganda competed at the 2014 Summer Youth Olympics, in Nanjing, China from 16 August to 28 August 2014.

== Medalists ==
Medal	Name	Sport	Event	Date
Silver	Geofrey Balimumiti	Athletics	Boys' 800 m	25 August

== Athletics ==
Uganda qualified three athletes.

Qualification Legend: Q=Final A (medal); qB=Final B (non-medal); qC=Final C (non-medal); qD=Final D (non-medal); qE=Final E (non-medal)

Boys
Track & road events

Athlete	Event	Heats		Final	
Athlete	Event	Result	Rank	Result	Rank
Geofrey Balimumiti	800 m	1:50.43	3 Q	1:49.37	2nd place, silver medalist(s)
Steven Mande	1500 m	3:54.88 PB	14 qB	3:59.12	15

Girls
Track & road events

Athlete	Event	Heats		Final	
Athlete	Event	Result	Rank	Result	Rank
Janat Chemusto	3000 m	9:10.74	7 Q	9:22.42	7

== Badminton ==
Uganda was given a quota to compete by the tripartite committee.

Singles

Athlete	Event	Group stage				Quarterfinal	Semifinal	Final / BM	Rank
Athlete	Event	Opposition Score	Opposition Score	Opposition Score	Rank	Opposition Score	Opposition Score	Opposition Score	Rank
Daniel Mihigo	Boys' Singles	K Tsuneyama (JPN); L 0 – 2	L Penalver (ESP); L 0 – 2	K Jakowczuk (POL); L 0 – 2	4	did not advance			

Doubles

Athlete	Event	Group stage				Quarterfinal	Semifinal	Final / BM	Rank
Athlete	Event	Opposition Score	Opposition Score	Opposition Score	Rank	Opposition Score	Opposition Score	Opposition Score	Rank
Lole Courtois (FRA); Daniel Mihigo (UGA)	Mixed Doubles	B He (CHN); S Dias (SRI); L 0 – 2	R Shivani (IND); A Ayittey (GHA); W w/o	T Hendahewa (SRI); B Ong (SIN); L 0 – 2	3	did not advance			

== Rowing ==
Uganda was given a boat to compete by the tripartite committee.

Athlete	Event	Heats		Repechage		Semifinals		Final	
Athlete	Event	Time	Rank	Time	Rank	Time	Rank	Time	Rank
Constance Mbambu	Girls' Single Sculls	4:53.18	6 R	4:44.62	5 SC/D	4:50.42	6 FD	4:56.12	24

Qualification Legend: FA=Final A (medal); FB=Final B (non-medal); FC=Final C (non-medal); FD=Final D (non-medal); SA/B=Semifinals A/B; SC/D=Semifinals C/D; R=Repechage

== Table Tennis ==
Uganda was given a quota to compete by the tripartite committee.

Singles

Athlete	Event	Group Stage	Rank	Round of 16	Quarterfinals	Semifinals	Final / BM	Rank
Athlete	Event	Opposition Score	Rank	Opposition Score	Opposition Score	Opposition Score	Opposition Score	Rank
Florence Seera	Girls	Group A K Stefcova (CZE); L 0 – 3	4 qB	G Piccolin (ITA); L w/o	did not advance			25
Florence Seera	Girls	G Arvelo (VEN); L 0 – 3	4 qB	G Piccolin (ITA); L w/o	did not advance			25
Florence Seera	Girls	H Doo (HKG); L 0 – 3	4 qB	G Piccolin (ITA); L w/o	did not advance			25

Team

Athletes	Event	Group Stage	Rank	Round of 16	Quarterfinals	Semifinals	Final / BM	Rank
Athletes	Event	Opposition Score	Rank	Opposition Score	Opposition Score	Opposition Score	Opposition Score	Rank
Africa 2 Florence Seera (UGA); Christ Bienatiki (CGO)	Mixed	Europe 2 N Trosman (ISR); E Ranefur (SWE); L w/o	4 qB	India; S Mukherjee (IND); A Yadav (IND); L w/o	did not advance			25
Africa 2 Florence Seera (UGA); Christ Bienatiki (CGO)	Mixed	United States; L Zhang (USA); K Avvari (USA); L w/o	4 qB	India; S Mukherjee (IND); A Yadav (IND); L w/o	did not advance			25
Africa 2 Florence Seera (UGA); Christ Bienatiki (CGO)	Mixed	Chinese Taipei; S Chiu (TPE); H Yang (TPE); L w/o	4 qB	India; S Mukherjee (IND); A Yadav (IND); L w/o	did not advance			25

Qualification Legend: Q=Main Bracket (medal); qB=Consolation Bracket (non-medal)
