= Elvanie Nimbona =

Burundian long-distance runner

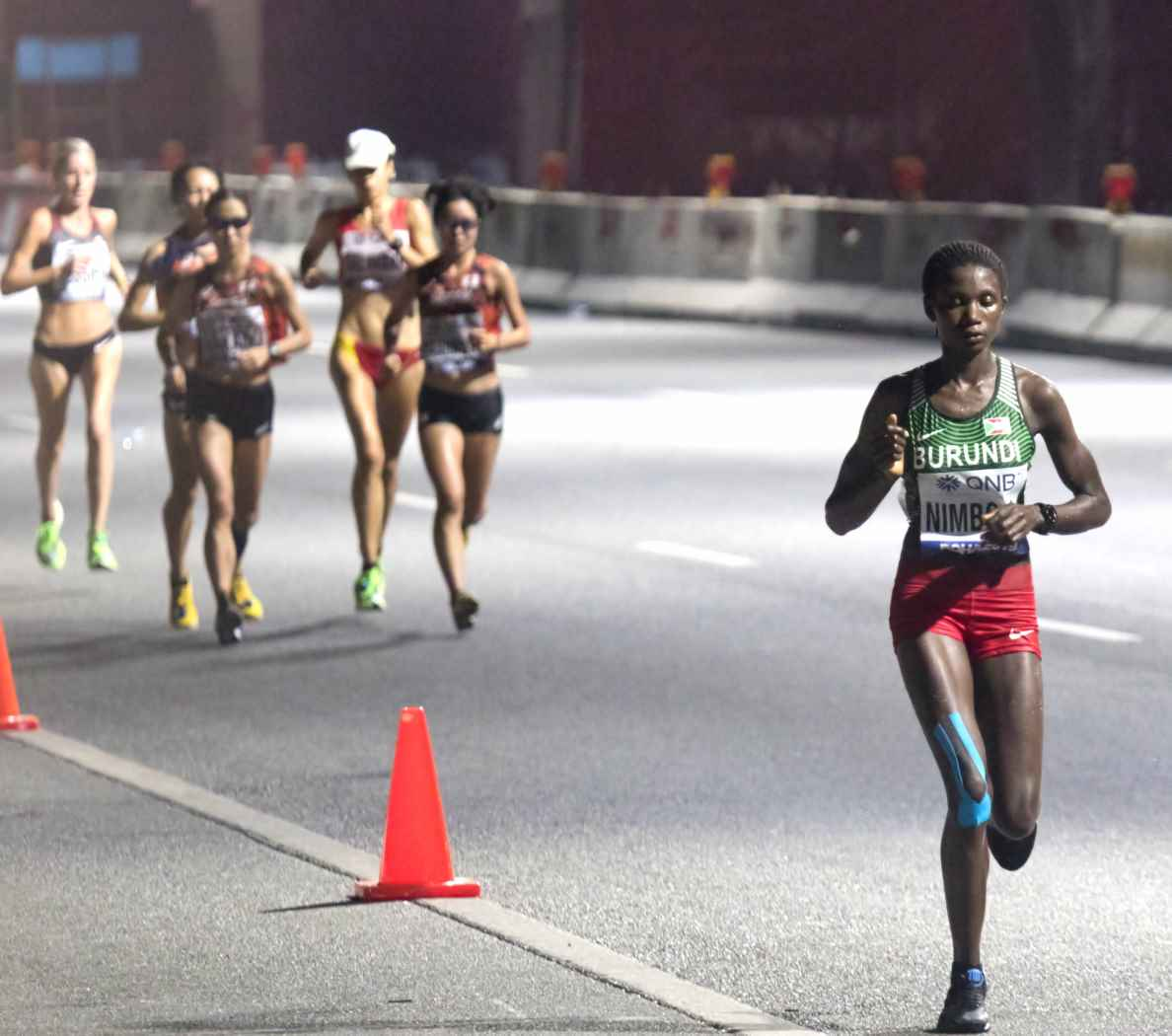
- Elvanie Nimbona in 2019 (far right)

Personal information
- Born: 15 March 1998 (age 27)

Sport
- Country: Burundi
- Sport: Long-distance running

Elvanie Nimbona (born 15 March 1998) is a Burundian long-distance runner. She competed in the senior women's race at the 2019 IAAF World Cross Country Championships. She finished in 55th place.

In 2017, she competed in the junior women's race at the 2017 IAAF World Cross Country Championships held in Kampala, Uganda. She finished in 16th place.

In 2019, she also competed in the women's marathon at the 2019 World Athletics Championships held in Doha, Qatar. She did not finish her race.
