= Adha Munguleya =

Ugandan long-distance runner

Personal information
- Born: 25 May 1999 (age 26)

Sport
- Country: Uganda
- Sport: Long-distance running

Adha Munguleya (born 25 May 1999) is an Ugandan long-distance runner.

In 2017, she competed in the junior women's race at the 2017 IAAF World Cross Country Championships held in Kampala, Uganda. She finished in 18th place. In 2018, she competed in the women's half marathon at the 2018 IAAF World Half Marathon Championships held in Valencia, Spain. She finished in 95th place.
