= Vanuatu at the 2018 Summer Youth Olympics =

- IOC code: VAN
- NOC: Vanuatu Association of Sports and National Olympic Committee

in Buenos Aires
- Competitors: 21 in 3 sports
- Flag bearer: Luduine Tebeim
- Medals: Gold 0 Silver 0 Bronze 0 Total 0

Summer Youth Olympics appearances
- 2010; 2014; 2018

Vanuatu competed at the 2018 Summer Youth Olympics, in Buenos Aires, Argentina, from 6 October to 18 October 2018.

== Competitors ==
The following is the list of number of competitors participating at the Games per sport/discipline.

Sport	Men	Women	Total
Athletics	1	0	1
Beach volleyball	0	2	2
Field hockey	9	9	18
Total	10	11	21

== Athletics ==
- Boys' 3000 metres - 1 quota Dick Kapalu

Athlete	Event	Stage 1		Stage 2		Total	
Athlete	Event	Time	Rank	Time	Rank	Time	Rank
Dick Kapalu	Boys' 3000 m	9:31.78	18	13:49	16	34	16

== Beach volleyball ==
Vanuatu was given a quota by the tripartite commission for the girls event to qualify a team of 2 athletes for the games.

Athlete	Event	Group stage		Round of 24	Round of 16	Quarterfinal	Semifinal	Final / BM	Rank
Athlete	Event	Opposition Score	Rank	Opposition Score	Opposition Score	Opposition Score	Opposition Score	Opposition Score	Rank
Ravo–Tebeim	Girls' tournament	Navas–Gonzalez (PUR); L 0-2; Giuli–Romi (PAR); L 0-2; Scampoli–Bertozzi (ITA); L 0-2	4	did not advance					

== Field hockey ==
Vanuatu qualified a boys and girls team of 9 athletes each at the Oceania Championships 2018.

=== Boys' tournament ===
Preliminary round

Pool A

Pos	Team	Pld	W	D	L	GF	GA	GD	Pts	Qualification
1	Argentina (H)	5	5	0	0	36	6	+30	15	Quarterfinals
2	Malaysia	5	4	0	1	31	11	+20	12	Quarterfinals
3	Poland	5	2	0	3	29	17	+12	6	Quarterfinals
4	Zambia	5	2	0	3	29	23	+6	6	Quarterfinals
5	Mexico	5	2	0	3	19	20	−1	6	9th place game
6	Vanuatu	5	0	0	5	5	72	−67	0	11th place game

Source: FIH
Rules for classification: 1) Points; 2) Goal difference; 3) Goals scored; 4) Head-to-head result.
(H) Hosts

7 October 2018
10:15

Malaysia	14–0	Vanuatu
Anuar 3', 7', 8', 14', 15', 20', 20'; Azahar 7', 13'; Mat 9'; Moharam 11', 12'; Rosdi 18'; Ishak 18'	Report

Umpires:
Peter Kabaso (KEN)
Nick Saunders (NZL)

8 October 2018
17:45

Argentina	18–0	Vanuatu
Marcucci 2', 3', 7', 10', 15'; Zarate 4', 19'; Micaz 5', 11', 12'; Garrone 5', 11'; Ibarra 6', 8', 16', 18'; Sarto 14', 20'	Report

Umpires:
Napoleon Chanamthabam (IND)
James Unkles (AUS)

9 October 2018
12:30

Mexico	8–3	Vanuatu
Estrada 2', 13'; Hernández 3', 10'; Palma 3'; Villegas 6', 17'; Sosa 18'	Report	Iawila 7'; Job 13', 19'

Umpires:
Napoleon Chanamthabam (IND)
Darren Hubach (RSA)

10 October 2018
15:30

Vanuatu	1–15	Poland
Katmatem 19'	Report	Jarzyński 1', 7'; E. Bembenek 1', 9', 15', 18', 20'; Chumeńczuk 8'; Zabłocki 9', 13', 14'; Nowkowski 10', 15', 16'; T. Bembenek 13'

Umpires:
Peter Kabaso (KEN)
Hristiyan Vasilev (BUL)

11 October 2018
09:30

Vanuatu	1–17	Zambia
Lily 20'	Report	Mubanga 2', 4', 11', 11'; Moyo 7', 12', 12', 13', 18', 19'; Bwali 8', 15', 17', 19'; Siwale 9'; Banda 16'; Kapeso 20'

Umpires:
Nick Saunders (NZL)
Napoleon Chanamthabam (IND)

Final round

12 October 2018
08:00

Vanuatu	2–9	Kenya
Muliaki 4'; Job 18'	Report	Wanganga 2', 17'; Ogenche 4', 12'; Ouma 6', 20'; Ndombi 9', 9'; Ndwati 10'

Umpires:
Napoleon Chanamthabam (IND)
Darren Hubach (RSA)

=== Girls' tournament ===
Preliminary round

Pos	Team	Pld	W	D	L	GF	GA	GD	Pts	Qualification
1	Argentina (H)	5	5	0	0	41	2	+39	15	Quarterfinals
2	India	5	4	0	1	29	10	+19	12	Quarterfinals
3	South Africa	5	3	0	2	19	13	+6	9	Quarterfinals
4	Austria	5	2	0	3	19	13	+6	6	Quarterfinals
5	Uruguay	5	1	0	4	23	13	+10	3	9th place game
6	Vanuatu	5	0	0	5	0	80	−80	0	11th place game

Source: FIH
Rules for classification: 1) Points; 2) Goal difference; 3) Goals scored; 4) Head-to-head result.
(H) Hosts

7 October 2018
17:00

Argentina	21–0	Vanuatu
Cerundolo 1', 10', 14', 16'; Miranda 2', 3'; Rubenacker 6', 9', 18', 20'; Ramallo 7' di Santo 9', 10', 20'; Bruggesser 11', 12', 15', 19'; Palet 11', 18', 20'	Report

Umpires:
Rhiannon Murrie (AUS)
Gemma Calderon (ESP)

8 October 2018
10:15

Vanuatu	0–11	South Africa
	Report	Weston 4', 7', 20' de Waal 8', 11', 13'; McLaren 9'; Welham 16'; Nkosi 18', 18', 19'

Umpires:
Chen Jianjun (CHN)
Fatma Mahmoud (EGY)

9 October 2018
16:15

Vanuatu	0–16	India
	Report	Lalremsiami 2', 10'; Reet 3', 6'; Tete 4', 13'; Kaur 5', 5'; Chetna 6', 14', 17'; Khan 8', 11', 12', 15'; Chaudhary 20'

Umpires:
Cynthia Clement (GHA)
Chen Jianjun (CHN)

10 October 2018
11:45

Uruguay	18–0	Vanuatu
Oliveros 2', 8', 10', 16', 16', 16'; Verga 2', 13', 13', 17'; Civetta 3'; Jover 5', 14'; Quiñones 6', 7', 20'; Suárez 17', 18'	Report

Umpires:
Chen Jianjun (CHN)
Gemma Calderon (ESP)

11 October 2018
14:45

Austria	14–0	Vanuatu
Herzog 1', 7', 18', 18'; Klausbruckner 2', 5', 19'; Kern 6', 11', 11'; Czech 13', 16'; Felber 14', 17'	Report

Umpires:
Chen Jianjun (CHN)
Cynthia Clement (GHA)

Final round

13 October 2018
08:00

Vanuatu	0–5	Mexico
	Report	Cuevas 10', 18', 20'; Ramírez 15', 19'

Umpires:
Cynthia Clement (GHA)
Gemma Calderon (ESP)

== See also ==
- Vanuatu at the 2018 Commonwealth Games
