= Central African Republic at the 2014 Summer Youth Olympics =

- IOC code: CAF
- NOC: Comité National Olympique et Sportif Centrafricain

in Nanjing
- Competitors: 2 in 1 sport

Summer Youth Olympics appearances
- 2010; 2014; 2018

Central African Republic competed at the 2014 Summer Youth Olympics, in Nanjing, China from 16 August to 28 August 2014.

== Athletics ==
Central African Republic qualified two athletes.

Qualification Legend: Q=Final A (medal); qB=Final B (non-medal); qC=Final C (non-medal); qD=Final D (non-medal); qE=Final E (non-medal)

Boys
Track & road events

Athlete	Event	Heats		Final	
Athlete	Event	Result	Rank	Result	Rank
Aime Yeguelet Yelity	800 m	2:02.45	18 qC	2:04.07	18

Girls
Track & road events

Athlete	Event	Heats		Final	
Athlete	Event	Result	Rank	Result	Rank
Prestige Ndarata	100 m	13.56	23 qC	13.49	20
