= Emily Venters =

American long-distance runner

Personal information
- Born: 6 June 1999 (age 27) Lawrence, Kansas
- Education: MS University of Utah, BS Boise State University, Lawrence Free State High School
- Height: 171 cm (5 ft 7 in)

Sport
- Sport: Track and field, Road running, Athletics
- Event(s): 5000 metres, 10,000 metres, Marathon
- College team: Utah Utes, Boise State Broncos
- Club: Nike Swoosh Track Club
- Turned pro: 2023
Medal record
Women's athletics
Representing United States
World Athletics U20 Championships
2018 Tampere	5000 m

Emily Venters (born June 6, 1999) is an American long-distance runner. She is the winner of numerous road distances. Venters races in every distance from 5K to the marathon.

== Professional ==
Emily Venters is a Nike signed marathon distance runner who will compete at 2025 Chicago Marathon.

On 3 August 2025, Venters place 9th over 5,000 Metres in 15:25.59 at the 2025 USA Outdoor Track and Field Championships.

On 2 March 2025, Venters placed 5th over half marathon in 1:09:03 at the 2025 USATF Road Running Half Marathon Championships in Atlanta, Georgia.

In 2024, Venters placed 2nd in the USATF 5 km Road Running Championships in 15:25 a.k.a. Abbott Laboratories Dash to the Finish Line 5KM in New York, NY.

In 2023, Venters place 7th over 10,000 Metres in 32:45.57 at the 2023 USA Outdoor Track and Field Championships.

On 10 January 2026, Venters placed 33rd overall at the 2026 World Athletics Cross Country Championships in Tallahassee.

== NCAA ==
Emily Venters is a 5-time NCAA All-American, Pac-12 Conference Champion, 3-time Pac-12 Conference honoree, & 2-time Mountain West Conference Cross Country Championships honoree.

representing Utah Utes
2023	2023 NCAA Division I Outdoor Track and Field Championships	10,000 meters	32:47.70	(silver) 2nd
2023	2023 NCAA Division I Outdoor Track and Field Championships	5000 meters	15:42.40	(bronze) 3rd
2023	Pac-12 Conference Outdoor Track and Field Championships	10,000 meters	32:32.98	(gold) 1st
2023	2023 NCAA Division I Indoor Track and Field Championships	5000 meters	16:25.28	5th
2022	2022 NCAA Division I Cross Country Championships	6,000 meters	19:54.1	12th
2022	Pac-12 Conference Cross Country Championships	6,000 meters	19:16.7	(silver) 2nd
2021	2021 NCAA Division I Cross Country Championships	6,000 meters	DNF	DNF
2021	Pac-12 Conference Cross Country Championships	6,000 meters	20:40.7	(bronze) 3rd
representing Boise State Broncos
2019	Mountain West Conference Indoor Track and Field Championships	3,000 meters	9:23.00	5th
2018	2018 NCAA Division I Cross Country Championships	6,000 meters	20:35.8	39th
2018	Mountain West Conference Cross Country Championships	6,000 meters	20:41.3	6th
2018	2018 IAAF World U20 Championships	5,000 meters	15:59.05	9th
2018	2018 USA Outdoor Track and Field Championships U20	5,000 meters	16:19.22	(silver) 2nd
2018	2018 NCAA Division I Outdoor Track and Field Championships	5,000 meters	15:54.19	27th
2018	Mountain West Conference Outdoor Track and Field Championships	10,000 meters	34:16.66	5th
2017	2017 NCAA Division I Cross Country Championships	6,000 meters	20:22.1	53rd
2017	Mountain West Conference Cross Country Championships	6,000 meters	20:55.6	7th

== Prep ==
Venters is a cross country All-American, 5-time Kansas State High School Activities Association 6A state Champion, 12-time state medalist, and 2-time Kansas Jayhawks Rim Rock Farm Cross Country Classic Champion.

representing Lawrence Free State High School
2017	2017 Brooks Sports PR Invitational	2 miles	10:19.31	7th
2017	2017 Kansas State High School Activities Association 6A; Outdoor Track and Field Championships	3200 m	10:35.90	(gold) 1st
2017	2017 Kansas State High School Activities Association 6A; Outdoor Track and Field Championships	1600 m	4:59.70	(gold) 1st
2016	2016 Nike Cross Nationals	5000 m	18:26.9	32nd
2016	2016 Kansas State High School Activities Association 6A State; Cross Country Championships	5000 m	18:09.9	(silver) 2nd
2016	2016 Festival of Miles	1 mile	4:56.58	11th
2016	2016 Kansas State High School Activities Association 6A; Outdoor Track and Field Championships	3200 m	10:35.31	(silver) 2nd
2016	2016 Kansas State High School Activities Association 6A; Outdoor Track and Field Championships	1600 m	4:56.93	(silver) 2nd
2016	2016 Kansas State High School Activities Association 6A; Outdoor Track and Field Championships	800 m	2:19.02	7th
2015	2015 Kansas State High School Activities Association 6A State; Cross Country Championships	5000 m	18:31.8	(bronze) 3rd
2015	2015 Kansas State High School Activities Association 6A; Outdoor Track and Field Championships	3200 m	11:03.37	(silver) 2nd
2015	2015 Kansas State High School Activities Association 6A; Outdoor Track and Field Championships	1600 m	5:10.60	(bronze) 3rd
2015	2015 Kansas State High School Activities Association 6A; Outdoor Track and Field Championships	800 m	2:24.57	12th
2014	2014 Kansas State High School Activities Association 6A State; Cross Country Championships	4000 m	14:52.2	(gold) 1st
2014	2014 Kansas State High School Activities Association 6A State; Outdoor Track and Field Championships	3200 m	10:58.08	(gold) 1st
2014	2014 Kansas State High School Activities Association 6A State; Outdoor Track and Field Championships	1600 m	5:03.84	(silver) 2nd
2014	2014 Kansas State High School Activities Association 6A State; Outdoor Track and Field Championships	800 m	2:20.92	5th
2013	2013 Kansas State High School Activities Association 6A State; Cross Country Championships	4000 m	14:58.4	(gold) 1st
