= Girmawit Gebrzihair =

Ethiopian long-distance runner (born 2001)

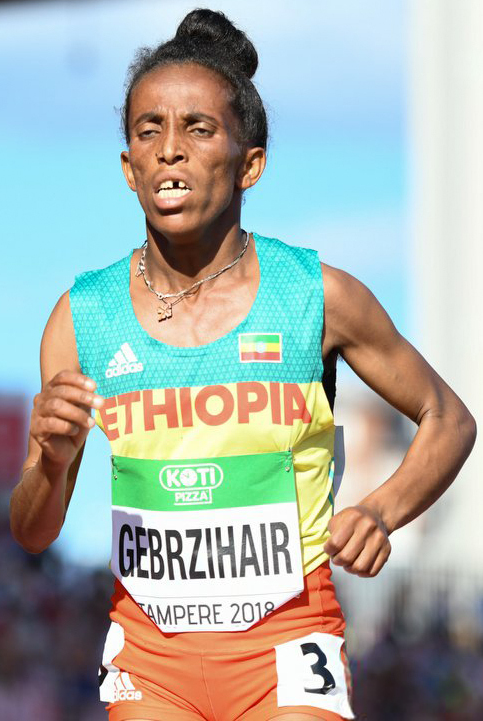
- Girmawit at the 2018 World U20 Championships in Athletics

Personal information
- Full name: Girmawit Gebrzihair Gebru; Girmawit Gebregziabher
- Nationality: Ethiopia
- Born: 21 November 2001 (age 24)

Sport
- Sport: Athletics
- Events: Half marathon 10,000 metres

Achievements and titles
- National finals: 2019 Ethiopian Champs; • 10,000m, 7th; 2022 Ethiopian Champs; • 10,000m, 1st (gold)
- Personal bests: HM: 1:04:14 (2022); 10,000m: 30:23.69 (2023)
Medal record
Women's athletics
Representing Ethiopia
World U20 Championships
Bronze medal – third place	2018 Tampere	5000 m
World Cross Country Championships
Silver medal – second place	2024 Belgrade	Senior Women's team
Gold medal – first place	2019 Aarhus	U20 team
African Cross Country Championships
Gold medal – first place	2018 Chlef	U20 race
- Updated on 1 January 2024

Girmawit Gebrzihair Gebru (born 21 November 2001), also spelled Girmawit Gebregziabher, is an Ethiopian long-distance runner. In 2022, she ran the fourth-fastest half-marathon of all time with a 64:14 performance.

In 2018, Girmawit won the bronze medal at the 2018 World U20 Championships in Athletics in the women's 5000 m. Her age was the subject of controversy after athletes and journalists claimed photos of her from the event depicted someone older than her official age of 16, though no official proof of age cheating was provided.

== Career ==
Girmawit first caught attention in 2017 at the age of 15, when she finished second at the Great Ethiopian Run with a time of 32:33 over the 10K run distance. According to the Association of Road Racing Statisticians records, this mark was a single-age best for 15 year olds by 46 seconds, beating Irvette van Zyl of South Africa's time from 2003.

In 2018, she won the Ethiopian Athletics U20 Championships in the 5000 m with a time of 15:48.81 and the next day finished third in the 3000 m. In July, at the age of 16, she participated in the World U20 Championships in Athletics and finished third behind Beatrice Chebet and Ejgayehu Taye with a time of 15:34.01 minutes.

In 2019, Girmawit finished fifth in the U20 race at the World Cross Country Championships, helping her team win the gold medal. In July, she placed eighth in the 10,000 m at the Ethiopian qualifiers for the World Championships in Athletics, setting a personal best but not making the team.

In 2020 and 2021, Girmawit was not listed in any competition results.

In January 2022, Girmawit competed in the Great Ethiopian Run, finishing second with a time of 31:29, behind Yalemzerf Yehualaw. On 19 February, she set a new course record at the RAK Half Marathon with a time of 1:04:14. The time was the fourth fastest ever run by a woman in the half marathon. In May, Girmawit finished fifth in the 3000 m at the 2022 Doha Diamond League with a time of 8:41.88.

In March 2024, Girmawit helped Ethiopia's team place 2nd at 2024 World Athletics Cross Country Championships – Senior women's race.

== Age controversy ==
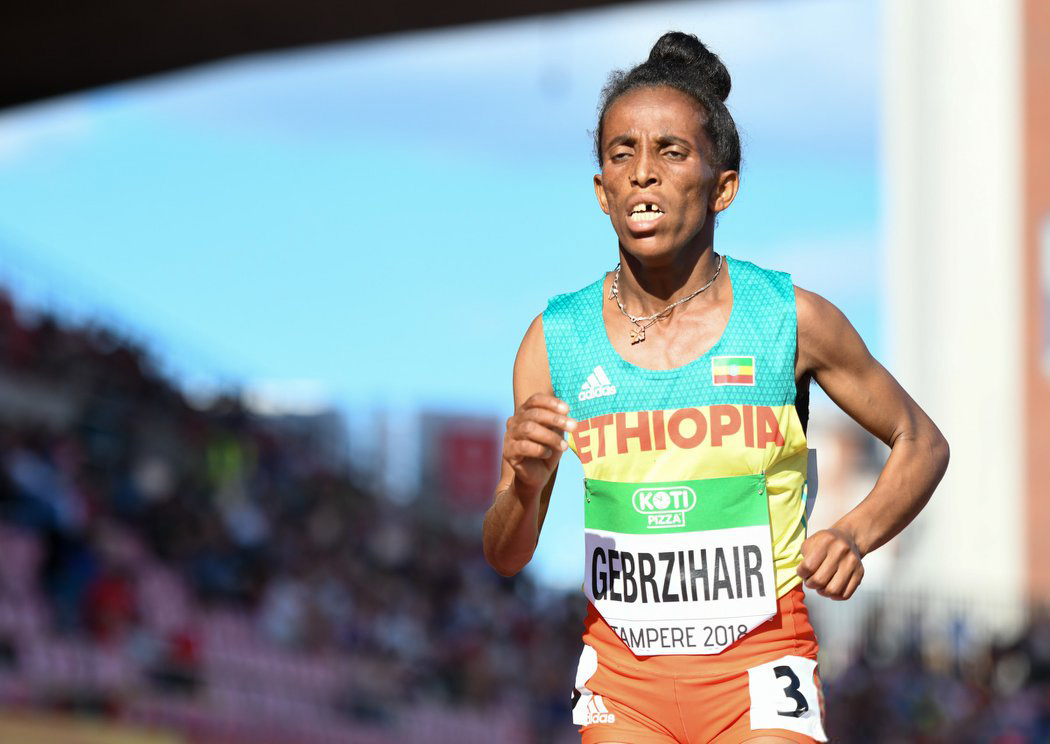
The photo of Girmawit from World U20s that went viral and resulted in ridicule

In July 2018, photos of Girmawit from the 2018 World U20 Championships in Athletics went viral for her apparent age. Sprinter Óscar Husillos tweeted in Spanish, "Her children and grandchildren are in the stands to see her run in the World U20 Championships". Other journalists also ridiculed the photos, claiming that Girmawit could not possibly be 16 years old.

Despite the controversy, there has been no proven evidence that Girmawit is over-aged. Husillos later deleted his tweet, claiming that it was taken out of context and his words were misinterpreted.

== Statistics ==
=== Personal bests ===
Event	Mark	Place	Competition	Venue	Date	Ref
Half marathon	1:04:14	1st place, gold medalist(s)	Ras Al Khaimah Half Marathon	Ras Al Khaimah, United Arab Emirates	19 February 2022	
10,000 metres	30:23.69	5th	Ethiopian 10,000m World Championships Trials	Nerja, Spain	23 June 2023	
