= Athletics at the 2014 Summer Youth Olympics – Boys' 800 metres =

Athletics – Boys' 800 metres at the II Summer Youth Olympic Games
- Venue: Nanjing Olympic Sports Centre
- Date: August 22–25
- Competitors: 21 from 21 nations

Medalists
1st place, gold medalist(s)		Myles Marshall	United States
2nd place, silver medalist(s)		Geofrey Balimumiti	Uganda
3rd place, bronze medalist(s)		Bacha Mulata	Ethiopia

The boys’ 800 m competition at the 2014 Summer Youth Olympics was held on 22–25 August 2014 in Nanjing Olympic Sports Center.

== Schedule ==
Date	Time	Round
22 August 2014	21:00	Heats
25 August 2014	19:55	Final

== Results ==
=== Heats ===
Eight fastest athletes advanced to Final A, the others advanced to Final B, or C according to their times.

Rank	Heat	Lane	Athlete	Result	Notes	Q
1	1	4	Myles Marshall (USA)	1:50.22		FA
2	1	2	Mohamed El Amrani (MAR)	1:50.26	PB	FA
3	3	7	Geofrey Balimumiti (UGA)	1:50.43	PB	FA
4	3	5	Ryan Patterson (AUS)	1:50.68	PB	FA
5	1	6	Idriss Moussa Youssouf (QAT)	1:50.77	PB	FA
6	1	3	Tom Elmer (SUI)	1:51.12		FA
7	2	8	Bacha Morka (ETH)	1:51.18		FA
8	1	5	Godfrey Chama (ZAM)	1:51.29	PB	FA
9	2	2	Madalin Gheban (ROU)	1:51.45		FB
10	2	7	Benediktas Mickus (LTU)	1:51.54	PB	FB
11	3	4	Abdi Aden Abdi (DJI)	1:51.62	PB	FB
12	2	6	Sabry Salem Mohamed Asar (EGY)	1:52.35		FB
13	3	2	Anthony Kiptoo (KEN)	1:52.55		FB
14	3	8	Gorata Gabanketse (BOT)	1:54.66		FB
15	2	4	Adam Abdelgader (SUD)	1:56.44		FB
16	2	5	Izidor Ralaimihaja (MAD)	2:00.93		FC
17	1	7	Tahar Lazaar (ALG)	2:00.99		FC
18	3	3	Raoul Yeguelet (CAF)	2:02.45		FC
19	2	3	Domingos Dos Santos (TLS)	2:03.88	PB	FC
	1	8	Ahmed Hussein Hassan (SOM)	DSQ		FC
	3	6	Mazunzo Kasiteni (MAW)	DSQ		FC

=== Finals ===
==== Final A ====
Rank	Final Placing	Lane	Athlete	Result	Notes
1st place, gold medalist(s)	1	7	Myles Marshall (USA)	1:49.14	
2nd place, silver medalist(s)	2	4	Geofrey Balimumiti (UGA)	1:49.37	PB
3rd place, bronze medalist(s)	3	2	Bacha Morka (ETH)	1:49.73	
4	4	6	Mohamed El Amrani (MAR)	1:49.99	PB
5	5	5	Ryan Patterson (AUS)	1:50.58	PB
6	6	8	Tom Elmer (SUI)	1:52.35	
7	7	3	Godfrey Chama (ZAM)	1:52.49	
		9	Idriss Moussa Youssouf (QAT)	DSQ	

==== Final B ====
Rank	Final Placing	Lane	Athlete	Result	Notes
1	8	6	Benediktas Mickus (LTU)	1:52.40	
2	9	5	Madalin Gheban (ROU)	1:52.56	
3	10	4	Abdi Aden Abdi (DJI)	1:53.24	
4	11	3	Sabry Salem Mohamed Asar (EGY)	1:54.18	
5	12	2	Adam Abdelgader (SUD)	1:56.26	
6	13	8	Gorata Gabanketse (BOT)	1:58.30	
		7	Anthony Kiptoo (KEN)	DSQ	

==== Final C ====
Rank	Final Placing	Lane	Athlete	Result	Notes
1	14	4	Tahar Lazaar (ALG)	1:59.45	
2	15	3	Izidor Ralaimihaja (MAD)	2:00.35	
3	16	7	Mazunzo Kasiteni (MAW)	2:00.70	PB
4	17	6	Domingos Dos Santos (TLS)	2:02.58	PB
5	18	5	Raoul Yeguelet (CAF)	2:04.07	
		2	Ahmed Hussein Hassan (SOM)	DNS	
