= Athletics at the 2018 Summer Youth Olympics – Boys' 3000 metres =

Boys' 3000 metres at the III Summer Youth Olympic Games
- Venue: Parque Polideportivo Roca
- Date: 11 October and 15 October 2018
- Competitors: 18 from 18 nations

Medalists
1st place, gold medalist(s)		Jackson Kavesa Muema	Kenya
2nd place, silver medalist(s)		Berihu Aregawi	Ethiopia
3rd place, bronze medalist(s)		Oscar Chelimo	Uganda

The boys' 3000 metres competition at the 2018 Summer Youth Olympics was held on 11 and 15 October, at the Parque Polideportivo Roca.

== Schedule ==
All times are in local time (UTC-3).

Date	Time	Round
11 October 2018	15:30	Stage 1
15 October 2018	10:00	Cross Country

== Results ==
=== Stage 1 ===
Rank	Athlete	Nation	Result	Notes
1	Oscar Chelimo	Uganda	8:08.20	
2	Berihu Aregawi	Ethiopia	8:09.17	
3	Jackson Kavesa Muema	Kenya	8:09.95	
4	Evan Burke	Canada	8:14.99	PB
5	Rintaro Kajiyama	Japan	8:22.15	
6	Haben Ghebremariam	Eritrea	8:22.45	
7	Francesco Guerra	Italy	8:24.27	
8	Ömer Amaçtan	Turkey	8:26.39	PB
9	Aime Phraditte Bakunzi	Rwanda	8:26.70	PB
10	Clemens Erdmann	Germany	8:29.27	
11	Adisu Guadia	Israel	8:30.27	
12	Francis Damiano Damasi	Tanzania	8:30.91	
13	Layth Hakim Hussein Albohaya	Iraq	8:39.44	PB
14	Julius Mäkinen	Finland	8:41.41	
15	Fayez Abdullah Alsubaie	Saudi Arabia	8:45.61	PB
16	Abdllah Jehad Mohammad Almeleefi	Jordan	8:45.95	PB
17	Gamil Saleh Ali Al-Hamati	Yemen	8:52.07	
18	Dick Kapalu	Vanuatu	9:31.78	PB

=== Cross Country ===
Rank	Overall rank	Athlete	Nation	Result	Notes
1	1	Jackson Kavesa Muema	Kenya	11:12	
2	2	Berihu Aregawi	Ethiopia	11:13	
3	3	Oscar Chelimo	Uganda	11:28	
4	5	Francis Damiano Damasi	Tanzania	11:35	
5	13	Haben Ghebremariam	Eritrea	11:54	
6	16	Evan Burke	Canada	11:59	
7	18	Adisu Guadia	Israel	12:06	
8	19	Rintaro Kajiyama	Japan	12:10	
9	22	Ömer Amaçtan	Turkey	12:15	
10	27	Clemens Erdmann	Germany	12:29	
11	35	Layth Hakim Hussein Albohaya	Iraq	12:38	
12	36	Gamil Saleh Ali Al-Hamati	Yemen	12:42	
13	39	Abdllah Jehad Mohammad Almeleefi	Jordan	12:46	
14	40	Julius Mäkinen	Finland	12:48	
15	45	Aime Phraditte Bakunzi	Rwanda	13:01	
16	51	Dick Kapalu	Vanuatu	13:49	
		Francesco Guerra	Italy	DNF	
		Fayez Abdullah Alsubaie	Saudi Arabia	DNS	

=== Final placing ===
Rank	Athlete	Nation	Stage 1	Cross Country	Total
1st place, gold medalist(s)	Jackson Kavesa Muema	Kenya	3	1	4
2nd place, silver medalist(s)	Berihu Aregawi	Ethiopia	2	2	4
3rd place, bronze medalist(s)	Oscar Chelimo	Uganda	1	3	4
4	Evan Burke	Canada	4	6	10
5	Haben Ghebremariam	Eritrea	6	5	11
6	Rintaro Kajiyama	Japan	5	8	13
7	Francis Damiano Damasi	Tanzania	12	4	16
8	Ömer Amaçtan	Turkey	8	9	17
9	Adisu Guadia	Israel	11	7	18
10	Clemens Erdmann	Germany	10	10	20
11	Layth Hakim Hussein Albohaya	Iraq	13	11	24
12	Aime Phraditte Bakunzi	Rwanda	9	15	24
13	Julius Mäkinen	Finland	14	14	28
14	Gamil Saleh Ali Al-Hamati	Yemen	17	12	29
15	Abdllah Jehad Mohammad Almeleefi	Jordan	16	13	29
16	Dick Kapalu	Vanuatu	18	16	34
	Francesco Guerra	Italy	7	DNF	
	Fayez Abdullah Alsubaie	Saudi Arabia	15	DNS	
