= Amedework Walelegn =

Ethiopian long-distance runner

Personal information
- Born: March 11, 1999 (age 27) Ethiopia

Sport
- Country: Ethiopia
- Sport: Track and field
- Event: Half marathon

Achievements and titles
- Personal bests: 10,000 meters: 28:00.14; Half marathon: 58:53

Amedework Walelegn (born March 11, 1999) is an Ethiopian long-distance runner. In 2016, he finished 4th in the 10,000m at the IAAF World U20 Championships in Bydgoszcz.

Walelegn finished 2nd and won the silver medal at the 2017 IAAF World Cross Country Championships in the Junior Men's race. He won the Istanbul Half Marathon in 2018, breaking the Istanbul Half record. In the same year, Walelegn finished 2nd in the New Delhi Half Marathon while also setting a new personal best at 59:22. At the 2020 World Athletics Half Marathon Championships, Walelegn finished 3rd and set a PB with a time of 59:08.

At the 2020 New Delhi Half Marathon, Walelegn won with a time of 58:53, breaking his own personal best and the course's record. It was also the 23rd fastest half marathon ever recorded at the time.

== Personal Bests ==
The following statistics are from the IAAF.

- 5000m - 13:14.52 (2017)
- 10,000m - 28:00.14 (2016)
- 10K run - 27:37 (2018)
- Half Marathon - 58:53 (2020)

== International Competitions ==
Year	Competition	Venue	Position	Event	Time
2016	IAAF World U20 Championships	Bydgoszcz, Poland	4th	10,000m	28:00.14 (PB)
2017	IAAF World Cross Country Championships	Kampala, Uganda	2nd	Junior Men's Race	22:43
2020	World Athletics Half Marathon Championships	Gdynia, Poland	3rd	Half Marathon	59:08 (PB)
