= Mehari Tsegay =

Eritrean long-distance runner

Personal information
- Born: 12 February 1999 (age 26)

Sport
- Country: Eritrea
- Sport: Long-distance running

Mehari Tsegay (born 12 February 1999) is an Eritrean long-distance runner. In 2019, he competed in the senior men's race at the 2019 IAAF World Cross Country Championships held in Aarhus, Denmark. He finished in 31st place.

In 2017, he competed in the junior men's race at the 2017 IAAF World Cross Country Championships held in Kampala, Uganda.
