= Vincent Kipkemoi =

Kenyan long-distance runner

Vincent Kipkemoi Ngetich
Personal information
- Nationality: Kenyan
- Born: 3 January 1999 (age 27)

Sport
- Sport: Athletics
- Events: 10K; half marathon; marathon

Achievements and titles
- Personal bests: Half marathon: 59:09 (Copenhagen 2022); Marathon: 2:03:13 (Berlin 2023)
Medal record
World Marathon Majors
| Silver medal – second place | 2023 Berlin | Marathon |
| Bronze medal – third place | 2024 Tokyo | Marathon |
| Bronze medal – third place | 2025 Tokyo | Marathon |

External image
- Running in the 2023 Berlin Marathon

Vincent Kipkemoi Ngetich (born 3 January 1999) is a long-distance runner from Kenya.

He won the 2022 Madrid Half Marathon with a time of 1:01:05, and the 2023 10 km de Port-Gentil with a time of 28:11. In his debut at the marathon distance, he placed second at the 2023 Berlin Marathon with a time of 2:03:13, 31 seconds behind his compatriot Eliud Kipchoge, who held the marathon world record.
