= 2018 IAAF World U20 Championships – Women's 5000 metres =

Women's 5000 metres at the 2018 World U20 Championships
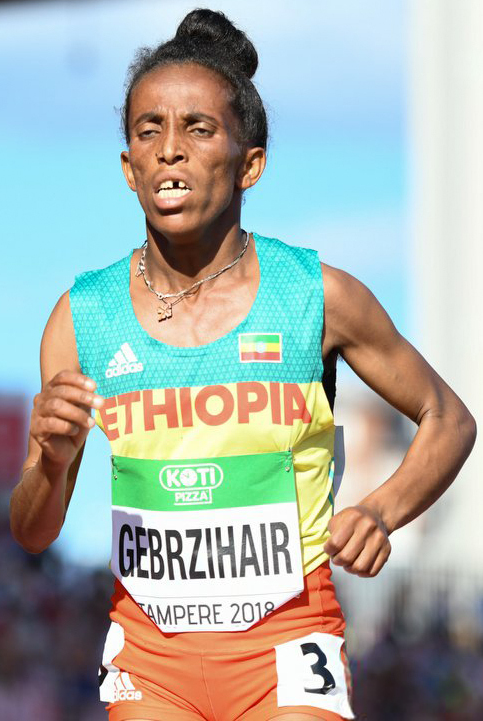
- Girmawit Gebrzihair the Ethiopian 16 years old bronze medal winner
- Venue: Ratina Stadium
- Dates: 10 July
- Competitors: 14 from 10 nations
- Winning time: 15:30.77

Medalists
gold medal	Beatrice Chebet	Kenya
silver medal	Ejgayehu Taye	Ethiopia
bronze medal	Girmawit Gebrzihair	Ethiopia

The women's 5000 metres at the 2018 IAAF World U20 Championships was held at Ratina Stadium on 10 July.

== Records ==
Standing records prior to the 2018 IAAF World U20 Championships
World U20 Record	Tirunesh Dibaba (ETH)	14:30.88	Bergen, Norway	11 June 2004
Championship Record	Genzebe Dibaba (ETH)	15:08.06	Moncton, Canada	21 July 2010
World U20 Leading	Meskerem Mamo (ETH)	15:05.21	Tübingen, Germany	16 June 2018

== Results ==
Rank	Name	Nationality	Time	Note
1st place, gold medalist(s)	Beatrice Chebet	Kenya	15:30.77	PB
2nd place, silver medalist(s)	Ejgayehu Taye	Ethiopia	15:30.87	PB
3rd place, bronze medalist(s)	Girmawit Gebrzihair	Ethiopia	15:34.01	PB
4	Sarah Chelangat	Uganda	15:43.01	
5	Hellen Ekarare Lobun	Kenya	15:45.07	
6	Dolshi Tesfu	Eritrea	15:52.84	PB
7	Tomomi Musembi Takamatsu	Japan	15:55.74	
8	Cailie Logue	United States	15:56.00	PB
9	Emily Venters	United States	15:59.05	
10	Zhao Yanli	China	16:17.64	PB
11	Marie-Lyssa LaFontaine	Canada	16:36.43	
12	Bohdana Semyonova	Ukraine	16:45.45	
13	Clio Ozanne-Jaques	Australia	16:46.75	
14	Miku Moribayashi	Japan	17:08.55	
