= Betesfa Getahun =

Ethiopian long-distance runner

Personal information
- Born: 25 September 1998 (age 27)

Sport
- Country: Ethiopia
- Sport: Long-distance running

Betesfa Getahun (born 25 September 1998) is an Ethiopian long-distance runner. In 2018, he competed in the men's half marathon at the 2018 IAAF World Half Marathon Championships held in Valencia, Spain. He finished in 6th place.

In 2017, he competed in the junior men's race at the 2017 IAAF World Cross Country Championships held in Kampala, Uganda.

In 2018, he competed in his first half marathons, in 2019 in the first marathon.

== Personal bests ==
Distance	Time	Date	Location
5000 m	13:13.23	22 July 2017	Heusden-Zolder
10,000 m	27:39	13 January 2019	Valencia
Half marathon	1:00:26	20 September 2018	København
Marathon	2:05:28	20 October 2019	Amsterdam
