= Hellen Ekalale Lobun =

Kenyan long-distance runner

Personal information
- Nationality: Kenyan
- Born: 18 March 1999 (age 27)

Sport
- Sport: Athletics
- Event(s): Long distance running, Cross country running
Medal record
Women's athletics
Representing Kenya
World Cross Country Championships
Silver medal – second place	2017 Kampala	Junior team

Hellen Ekalale Lobun (born 18 March 1999) is a Kenyan long distance and cross-country runner.

== Career ==
She finished fifth in the junior women's individual race and won the silver medal in the junior women's team race at the 2017 IAAF World Cross Country Championships in Kampala, Uganda.

She was runner-up at the Kenyan U20 Championships in 2018 to Beatrice Chebet over 5000 metres. She finished fifth at the 2018 IAAF World U20 Championships in the Women's 5000 metres in Tampere, Finland.

She ran a personal best 29:30 to win the 10K Valencia road race on 12 January 2025, this time placed her fourth on the world all-time list.

She ran a personal best 8:36.85 to finish sixth in the 3000 metres in Stockholm at the 2025 BAUHAUS-galan event, part of the 2025 Diamond League.

== Personal life ==
She runs locally in Kenya for Nairobi Region, but has also been based in Japan.

== Statistics ==
Grand Slam Track results
Slam	Race group	Event	Pl.	Time	Prize money
2025 Kingston Slam	Long distance	3000 m	4th	8:42.51	US$25,000
2025 Kingston Slam	Long distance	5000 m	5th	15:28.70	US$25,000
