= Richard Yator =

Kenyan long-distance runner

Personal information
- Born: 6 April 1998 (age 28)

Sport
- Country: Kenya
- Sport: Long-distance running
Medal record
Men's long-distance running
Representing Kenya
African Games
Bronze medal – third place	2019 Rabat	5000 m

Richard Yator (born 6 April 1998) is a Kenyan long-distance runner.

In 2015, he won the silver medal in the boys' 3000 metres at the 2015 African Youth Athletics Championships held in Reduit, Mauritius. In 2017, he won the bronze medal in the junior men's race at the 2017 IAAF World Cross Country Championships held in Kampala, Uganda.

In 2019, he competed in the senior men's race at the 2019 IAAF World Cross Country Championships held in Aarhus, Denmark. He finished in 13th place. A few months later, he competed in the men's 5000 metres event at the 2019 Diamond League Shanghai where he finished in 10th place with a time of 13:13.24. In the same year, he also represented Kenya at the 2019 African Games held in Rabat, Morocco. He competed in the men's 5000 metres and he won the bronze medal.
