= Filmon Ande =

Eritrean long-distance runner

Personal information
- Born: 10 February 1998 (age 27)

Sport
- Country: Eritrea
- Sport: Long-distance running

Filmon Ande (born 10 February 1998) is an Eritrean long-distance runner. In 2019, he competed in the senior men's race at the 2019 IAAF World Cross Country Championships held in Aarhus, Denmark. He finished in 22nd place.

In 2017, he competed in the junior men's race at the 2017 IAAF World Cross Country Championships held in Kampala, Uganda. In 2018, he competed in the senior men's race at the 2018 African Cross Country Championships held in Chlef, Algeria.
