= Solomon Berihu =

Ethiopian distance runner

Personal information
- Full name: Solomon Berihu Weldeslassie
- Nationality: Ethiopian
- Born: October 2, 1999 (age 26)

Sport
- Sport: Athletics
- Event(s): 5000 metres, 10,000 metres, half marathon
- Club: Ethiopia Electric

Achievements and titles
- Personal bests: 5000m: 13:02.08 (2019); 10000m: 27:02.26 (2019); HM: 59:17 (2019)
Medal record
Men's athletics
Representing Ethiopia
World Cross Country Championships
Gold medal – first place	2017 Kampala	Junior team
African Cross Country Championships
Bronze medal – third place	2018 Chlef	Junior race

Solomon Berihu (full name Solomon Berihu Weldeslassie or Solomon Berihu Weldeselassie; born 2 October 1999) is an Ethiopian distance runner. He was on the winning Ethiopian junior team at the 2017 IAAF World Cross Country Championships.

== Biography ==
In 2016, Berihu ran 13:12.67 for 5000 metres as a 17-year old to finish 6th at the Stockholm Diamond League, scoring one point in the 2016 Diamond League season.

In 2017, Berihu was a member of the Ethiopian national team at the 2017 World Cross Country Championships junior race, where he finished 14th. Though his place did not contribute to the team score, his country won the overall team standings with 17 points, beating runner-up Kenya with 28 points.

At the 2018 African Cross Country Championships junior race, Berihu was the individual bronze medalist and the first finisher from Ethiopia, losing only to Rhonex Kipruto and Stanley Mburu.

In 2019, Berihu won the Dam tot Damloop 10-mile in a time of 45:49. As of 2022, Berihu trains with Berihu Aregawi and Haftam Abadi in Ethiopia.

== Statistics ==
=== Personal bests ===
Event	Mark	Competition	Venue	Date
5000 metres	13:02.08	Fanny Blankers-Koen Games	Hengelo, Netherlands	9 June 2019
10,000 metres	27:02.26	Ethiopian World Team Trials	Hengelo, Netherlands	17 July 2019
Half marathon	59:17	Delhi Half Marathon	New Delhi, India	20 October 2019
