= Oscar Chelimo =

Ugandan long-distance runner

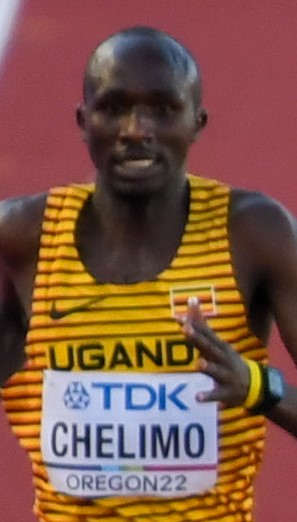
- Chelimo in 2022

Personal information
- Nationality: Ugandan
- Born: 12 December 2001 (age 24)

Sport
- Country: Uganda
- Sport: Athletics
- Event: Long-distance running
Medal record
Men's athletics
Representing Uganda
World Championships
| Bronze medal – third place | 2022 Eugene | 5000 m |
Youth Olympic Games
| Bronze medal – third place | 2018 Buenos Aires | 3000 m |
African Youth Games
| Silver medal – second place | 2018 Algiers | 3000 m |
World Cross Country Championships
| Silver medal – second place | 2019 Aarhus | U20 team |
| Bronze medal – third place | 2019 Aarhus | U20 race |

Oscar Chelimo (born 12 December 2001) is a Ugandan long-distance runner. He won the bronze medal for the 5000 metres at the 2022 World Athletics Championships.

His older brother, Jacob Kiplimo is also an elite long-distance runner.

== Career ==
In 2018, Oscar Chelimo finished in seventh place in the men's 5000 metres event at the World U20 Championships held in Tampere, Finland. He also competed in the boys' 3000 metres at the Youth Olympics in Buenos Aires, Argentina and won the bronze medal.

He represented Uganda at the 2019 African Games held in Rabat, Morocco, running in the men's 5000 m event to finish in fifth place. That same year, he also competed in the men's 5000 m event at the 2019 World Athletics Championships held in Doha, Qatar, though he did not qualify to compete in the final.

In 2020, he won the men's 5 kilometres road race at the BOclassic held in Bolzano, Italy.

On 12 May 2021, Chelimo raced the 5000 m in Bergamo, Italy, finishing third in 13:06.79, an Olympic qualifying time. Next he raced at the 60th Ostrava Golden Spike in the 3000 m, where he placed third in 7:43.00. He finished 16th in the 5000 m at the postponed 2020 Tokyo Olympics in August.

Chelimo won the bronze medal for the 5000 m at the 2022 World Athletics Championships held in Eugene, Oregon in July, and took his second victory at the BOclassic on the New Year's Eve that year (10 km).

In April 2023 Chelimo signed a contract with On Running.

== Achievements ==
=== International competitions ===
Representing Uganda
| Year | Competition | Venue | Position | Event | Result |
|---|---|---|---|---|---|
| 2017 | World U18 Championships | Nairobi, Kenya | 5th | 3000 m | 8:17.57 |
| 2018 | World U20 Championships | Tampere, Finland | 7th | 5000 m | 14:00.68 |
| 2018 | African Youth Games | Algiers, Algeria | 2nd | 3000 m | 8:00.72 |
| 2018 | Youth Olympic Games | Buenos Aires, Argentina | 3rd | 3000 m | 4 pts |
| 2019 | World Cross Country Championships | Aarhus, Denmark | 3rd | U20 race | 23:55 |
| 2019 | World Cross Country Championships | Aarhus, Denmark | 2nd | U20 team | 32 pts |
| 2019 | African U20 Championships | Abidjan, Ivory Coast | 6th | 5000 m | 13:54.88 |
| 2019 | African Games | Rabat, Morocco | 5th | 5000 m | 13:32.96 |
| 2019 | World Championships | Doha, Qatar | 28th (h) | 5000 m | 13:42.94 |
| 2021 | Olympic Games | Tokyo, Japan | 16th | 5000 m | 13:44.45 |
| 2022 | World Championships | Eugene, United States | 3rd | 5000 m | 13:10.20 |
| 2023 | World Championships | Budapest, Hungary | 5th (h) | 5000 m | 13:33.40^{1} |
| 2024 | Olympic Games | Paris, France | 20th | 5000 m | 13:31.56 |
| 2025 | World Championships | Tokyo, Japan | 18th | 10,000 m | 29:26.66 |
| 2026 | Commonwealth Games | Glasgow, United Kingdom | 12th | 10,000 m | 28:10.49 |

^{1}Did not finish in the final

=== Personal bests ===
- 1500 metres – 3:47.48 (Milan 2019)
- 3000 metres – 7:33.93 (Budapest 2025)
- 5000 metres – 13:00.42 (Brussels 2022)

Road

- 5 kilometres – 13:17 (Bolzano 2020)
- 10 kilometres – 28:06 (Arezzo 2021)
