= Athletics at the 2023 African Games – Women's 10,000 metres =

The women's 10,000 metres event at the 2023 African Games was held on 21 March 2024 in Accra, Ghana.

== Results ==
Rank	Name	Nationality	Time	Notes
1st place, gold medalist(s)	Janeth Chepngetich	Kenya	33:37.00	
2nd place, silver medalist(s)	Wede Kefale	Ethiopia	33:38.37	
3rd place, bronze medalist(s)	Tekan Amare	Ethiopia	33:51.50	
4	Ayana Mulisa	Ethiopia	34:45.37	
5	Theresa Kargbo	Sierra Leone	37:24.66	
	Francine Niyomukunzi	Burundi	DNS	
	Micheline Niyomahoro	Burundi	DNS	
	Hamida Nassoro	Tanzania	DNS	
