= 2017 IAAF World Cross Country Championships =

42nd World Cross Country Championships
- Organisers: IAAF
- Edition: 42nd
- Date: 26 March
- Host city: Kampala, Uganda
- Venue: Kampala
- Events: 5
- Distances: ~10 km – Senior men (9.858 km); ~8 km – Junior men (7.858 km); 10 km – Senior women (9.858 km); ~6 km – Junior women (5.858 km)
- Participation: 553 athletes from 59 nations
- Official website: Kampala 2017

The 2017 IAAF World Cross Country Championships was hosted in the city of Kampala, Uganda's capital. This 42nd edition was held on 26 March 2017. The venue was Kampala Airport, commonly known as Kololo airstrip, or officially, the Kololo Ceremonial Grounds. A few modifications were made to make the track challenging.

== Schedule ==
In keeping with past events, all five races, including the newly introduced mixed relay, were held in the afternoon. The first event was the inaugural mixed relay race, which was won by Kenya. The junior races preceded the senior races, and the senior men's event concluded the programme.

Date	Time (UTC)	Events
26 March	14:00	Mixed Relay
26 March	14:30	Junior race women
26 March	15:10	Junior race men
26 March	15:55	Senior race women
26 March	16:55	Senior race men

== Medallists ==
Event	Gold		Silver		Bronze	
Individual
Senior men (10 km)	Geoffrey Kipsang Kamworor (KEN)	28:24	Leonard Kiplimo Barsoton (KEN)	28:36	Abadi Hadis (ETH)	28:43
Senior women (10 km)	Irene Chepet Cheptai (KEN)	31:57	Alice Aprot Nawowuna (KEN)	32:01	Lilian Kasait Rengeruk (KEN)	32:11
Junior men (8 km)	Jacob Kiplimo (UGA)	22:40	Amdework Walelegn (ETH)	22:43	Richard Yator Kimunyan (KEN)	22:52
Junior women (6 km)	Letesenbet Gidey (ETH)	18:34	Hawi Feysa (ETH)	18:57	Celliphine Chepteek Chespol (KEN)	19:02
Team
Mixed Relay	Kenya; Asbel Kiprop; Winfred Mbithe; Bernard Koros; Beatrice Chepkoech	22:22	Ethiopia; Welde Tufa; Bone Cheluke; Yomif Kejelcha; Genzebe Dibaba	22:30	Turkey; Aras Kaya; Meryem Akda; Ali Kaya; Yasemin Can	22:37
Senior men	Ethiopia; Abadi Hadis; Jemal Yimer; Muktar Edris; Ibrahim Jeilan; Bonsa Dida; Getaneh Molla	21	Kenya; Geoffrey Kipsang Kamworor; Leonard Kiplimo Barsoton; Vincent Kipsang Rono; Leonard Patrick Komon; Nicholas Mboroto Kobimbei; Leonard Langat	22	Uganda; Timothy Toroitich; Abdallah Kibet Mande; Stephen Kiprotich; Joshua Kiprui Cheptegei; Phillip Kipyeko; Stephen Kissa	72
Senior women	Kenya; Irene Chepet Cheptai; Alice Aprot Nawowuna; Lilian Kasait Rengeruk; Hyvin Kiyeng Jepkemoi; Agnes Jebet Tirop; Faith Chepngetich Kipyegon	10	Ethiopia; Belaynesh Oljira; Senbere Teferi; Gebeyanesh Ayele; Sentayehu Lewetegn; Zerfie Limeneh; Dera Dida	45	Bahrain; Ruth Jebet; Rose Chelimo; Eunice Chebichii Chumba; Desi Mokonin; Bontu Rebitu	58
Junior men	Ethiopia; Amdework Walelegn; Betesfa Getahun; Selemon Barega; Tefera Mosisa; Bayelign Teshager; Solomon Berihu	17	Kenya; Richard Yator Kimunyan; Amos Kirui; Edwin Kiplangat Bett; Wesley Ledama; Ronald Kiprotich Kirui; Meshack Munguti Nzula	28	Eritrea; Yemane Haileselassie; Filmon Ande; Abraha Kokob; Mehari Tsegay; Robel Sibhatu	55
Junior women	Ethiopia; Letesenbet Gidey; Hawi Feysa; Fotyen Tesfay; Zeineba Yimer; Biri Abera; Wede Kefale	19	Kenya; Celliphine Chepteek Chespol; Sheila Chelangat; Hellen Ekalale Lobun; Joyline Cherotich; Emmaculate Chepkirui; Sandrafelis Chebet Tuei	20	Uganda; Peruth Chemutai; Sarah Chelangat; Adha Munguleya; Janat Chemusto; Esther Yeko Chekwemoi; Scarlet Chemos	63

== Medal table ==
Rank	Nation	Gold	Silver	Bronze	Total
1	Kenya	4	5	3	12
2	Ethiopia	4	4	1	9
3	Uganda	1	0	2	3
4	Bahrain	0	0	1	1
4	Eritrea	0	0	1	1
4	Turkey	0	0	1	1
Totals (6 entries)		9	9	9	27

- Note: Totals include both individual and team medals, with medals in the team competition counting as one medal.

== Participation ==
A total of 553 athletes from 59 countries were scheduled to participate. A Refugee Athletics Team was scheduled to participate in the mixed relay, but did not take part.

- Algeria (14)
- Australia (23)
- Bahrain (16)
- Belgium (1)
- Benin (2)
- Botswana (12)
- Brazil (1)
- Burundi (12)
- Cameroon (2)
- Canada (23)
- Central African Republic (1)
- China (7)
- Comoros (4)
- Congo (3)
- Denmark (6)
- Ecuador (4)
- Egypt (2)
- Eritrea (25)
- Ethiopia (30)
- Fiji (1)
- France (3)
- Gambia (1)
- Great Britain (21)
- Italy (10)
- Japan (21)
- Jordan (1)
- Kenya (30)
- Kuwait (12)
- Lebanon (7)
- Lesotho (2)
- Liberia (2)
- Madagascar (2)
- Malawi (7)
- Mexico (3)
- Morocco (18)
- Namibia (2)
- Nigeria (10)
- Peru (16)
- Portugal (2)
- Romania (1)
- Rwanda (6)
- Senegal (2)
- Seychelles (2)
- Sierra Leone (2)
- Somalia (2)
- South Sudan (10)
- South Africa (20)
- Spain (28)
- Sri Lanka (2)
- Sudan (14)
- Eswatini (2)
- Tajikistan (2)
- Tanzania (28)
- Turkey (5)
- Uganda (33)
- United States (28)
- Yemen (1)
- Zambia (2)
- Zimbabwe (4)
