= Bayelign Teshager =

Ethiopian long-distance runner

Bayelign Teshager (born February 9, 2000) is an Ethiopian long-distance runner and winner of the 2020 Los Angeles Marathon.

== Career ==
Teshager competed in both the 2017 IAAF World Cross Country Championships – Junior men's race (finishing 12th in a time of 23:35) and the 2017 IAAF World Cross Country Championships.

In March 2019, he ran a 1:00:31 half marathon at the Azkoitia-Azpeitia Half Marathon in Spain.

In March 2020, Teshager beat more than 23,000 to win the 35th Los Angeles Marathon in his marathon debut. His time was 2:08:25.

His Ethiopian team placed second in the 2026 World Half Marathon Championship, where he ran 1:01:52 for 39th place.
