= Brianna Thomas =

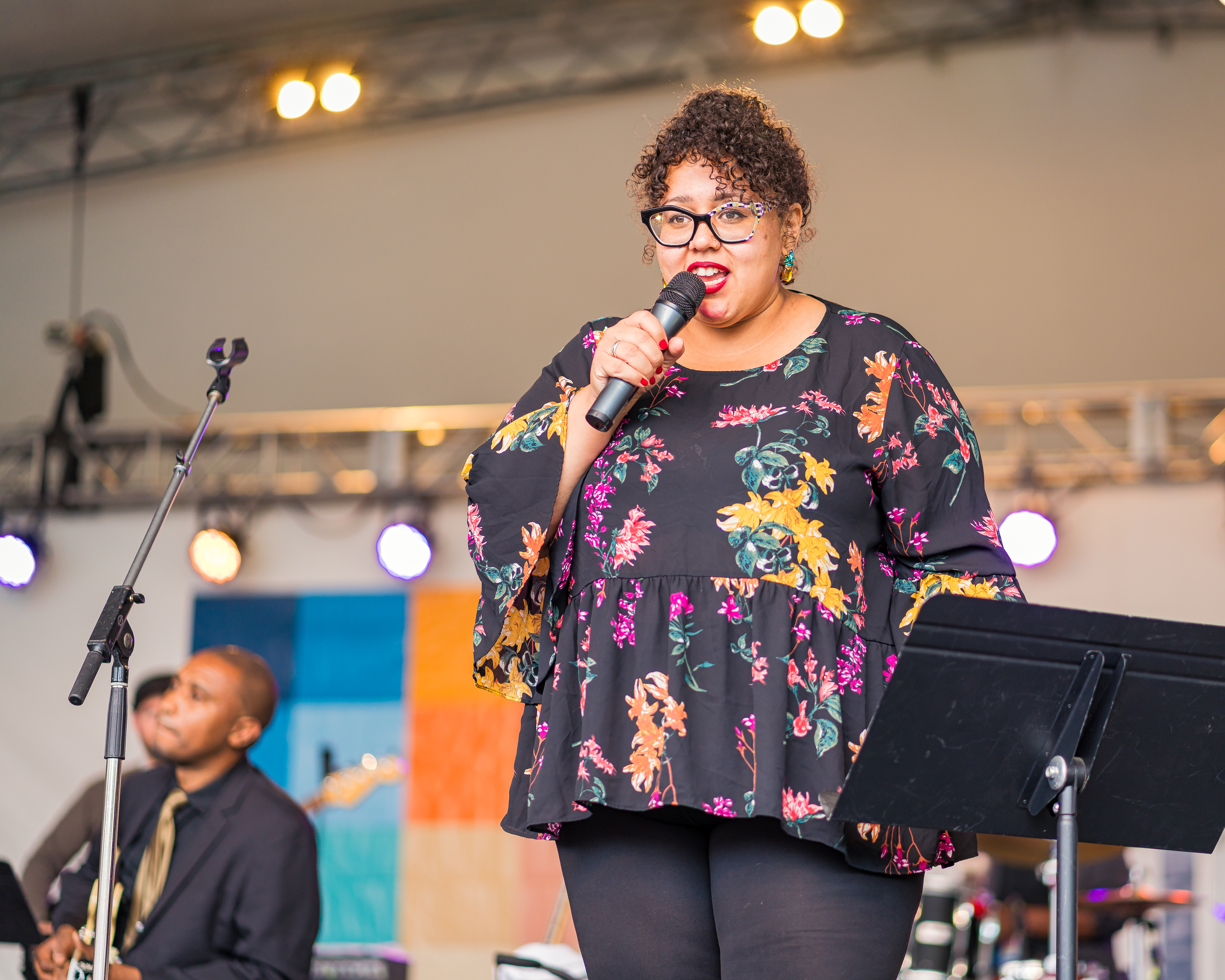
- Brianna Thomas at the Richmond Folk Festival in 2018

Background information
- Born: Peoria, Illinois, United States
- Genres: Jazz
- Occupations: Vocalist, band leader, singer, songwriter, educator
- Website: https://www.briannathomas.com/

Brianna Thomas is an American jazz singer, vocalist, composer, songwriter, band leader, and percussionist. She was born and raised in Peoria, Illinois, United States. She made her singing debut at the age of six. She is the daughter of drummer and vocalist Charlie Thomas. She is known as being one of the best young straight ahead young jazz singers, says music critic and author Will Friedwald. She is known to bring together various forms of American music from bluegrass to jazz in to an original hybrid of jazz/funk/rock and soul. Her voice is said to be strong and her range huge. She incorporates rare music in her repertoire of early female blues and jazz pioneers such as Bessie Smith, Victoria Spivey, Ma Rainey, Ethel Waters, Mamie Smith, and Ida Cox. All About Jazz said of her 2015 debut album, You Must Believe in Love, “Brianna Thomas is the complete package. Through this music she exhibits emotional depth, to-die-for scat skills, incredible pitch control and shading, strong songwriting skills, intuitively elastic phrasing, soulful bearing, and a great range.”

She is compared to Sarah Vaughan, Betty Carter and Dianne Reeves, singing ballad standards, cabaret music, Scat singing, and blues. She specializes in the 30s-style swing music. She is a Jazz at Lincoln Center regular. She is stated as being a down-to-earth Midwestern musician, embracing many flavors in her artistry from cha-cha, Afro Cuban, gospel, blues, swing, ballads, jazz standards, funk, soul, classic swing music.

== Early life ==
Brianna grew up around music and remembers at an early age around two going to clubs where her father would perform and rehearsals in their home. She made her singing debut at the age six doing a duet with her father Charlie “CJ” Thomas, singing "What A Wonderful World".

In her teens she toured Europe with a Big Band, and by 16 she performed at the Montreux, North Sea and Umbria Jazz Festivals. She has performed throughout her childhood at local and regional events. When she was eight years of age she won her first of first-place trophies from various district and regional talent shows. At the age of eight to ten she was performing gigs at banquets, black tie affairs and a guest at local radio stations. She worked with the distinguished jazz educator Mary Jo Papich and toured Europe with the Peoria Jazz All-Stars.

== Career ==
Thomas has performed with many well known jazz artists such as Clark Terry, Wycliffe Gordon, Houston Person, Mulgrew Miller, Wynton Marsalis, Russell Malone, The Legendary Count Basie Orchestra, Kurt Elling, Michael Feinsten, T.K. Blue, Dianne Reeves, Fred Anderson, Von Freeman, the Barber Brothers. Recently, Thomas performed with educator, performer and Wynton Marsalis. She participated with Wynton Marsalis as part of a lecture series at Harvard University called his “Meet Me at the Crossroads”.

She teaches Jazz in American history and today with Jazz For Young People Program that educates students in New York City Schools. She has performed at many international music festivals and venues; such as Montreux, North Sea, Umbria Jazz Festival, and venues in the Bahamas, and in Geneva, Switzerland. She was resident artist for the 2001 and 2002 for the Betty Carter Jazz Ahead Programs an international artist-in-residency program. A program that brought together a select group of jazz musicians to perform original compositions at the Kennedy Center. While with the "Jazz Ahead' program Thomas worked with jazz educators and performers such as vocalist Carmen Lundy, Winard Harper, and Nathan Davis.

In 2006, Brianna Thomas made her New York City debut performance at the Women in Jazz Festival. Which was held at Dizzy’s Club – Jazz at Lincoln Center. In 2006 she was made a guest appearance at the John F. Kennedy Center for the Performing Arts in Washington, D.C.

In 2007, she moved to New York City and attended the School of Jazz (The New School) for Jazz and Contemporary Music. At the New School she studied with Richard Harper, and Kenneth Kamal Scott. In New York she met pianist and swing band leader, Gordon Webster, where she became a featured vocalist and recorded with him.

Thomas has performed around the world at various venues from New York to California, Canada, Korea, etc. She has performed at the Sochi Jazz Festival in Sochi. Performed in Russia and Bern, Switzerland.

She has performed with many musicians such as; Clark Terry, Curtis Fuller, Wycliffe Gordon, Victor Goines, Junior Mance, Charles Tolliver, Reggie Workman, Frank Wess, Paul West, Rene Marie, Fred Anderson, Von Freeman, Jimmy Owens, Norman Simmons, Art Baron, Curtis Fuller, Winard Harper, Ulysses Owens, The Amigos Band, and Houston Person. Dominick Farinacci (trumpeter), Nick Grinder (Trombone), Tivon Pennicott (tenor sax), Greg Lewis (organist), Kyle Poole (Drums), Ethan Mann (Guitar), Yi - Ting Chiang (Violin), Marvin Sewell (guitar), Ryan Berg (bass), Malik Washington (drums), Russell Malone (guitarist), Carmen Lundy (vocalist), Winard Harper (drummer), Nathan Davis (saxophonist), Dianne Reeves, Catherine Russell (singer), Greg Lewis (pianist), and alto saxophonist Patrick Bartley (alto saxophonist), Dion Parson/21st Century Band, Fred Anderson (musician) (saxophone), and James Hurt (piano).

The Brianna Thomas Quartet musicians include; Conun Pappas (piano), Rob Adkins (bass), John Davis (drums), Linton Smith (trumpet), Joe Wiggan (taps), Greg Ward (alto), Riza Printup (harp), Brianna Thomas (vocals).

In 2009, she won the New York’s Jazzmobile Vocal Competition “Best of the Best”.

In 2014, Thomas was a musical ambassador for the "American Music Abroad" program, touring South East Asia.

In October 2018, she appeared at the 14th Richmond Folk Festival in Richmond, Virginia.

Thomas teaches 'Jazz in American History' and 'Today for Jazz For Young People' programs, which educates students in New York City schools.

== Awards ==
- 1996 African-American Hall of Fame - Peoria, Illinois
- 2009, The Jazzmobile in New York
- 2001, Down Beat magazine award "High School Jazz Vocalist of the Year".

== Discography ==
- 2014 - You Must Believe in Love; her debut CD on (Sound on Purpose Records), with Allyn Johnson, piano; Yasushi Nakamura, bass; Ulysses Owens, drums, Riza Printup, harp; Marcus Printup, trumpet/flugelhorn; Wycliffe Gordon, trombone. Produced by Ulysses Owens Jr.
