= 2017 IAAF World Cross Country Championships – Junior men's race =

Junior men's race at the 2017 IAAF World Cross Country Championships
- Organisers: IAAF
- Date: March 26
- Host city: Kampala, Uganda
- Events: 1
- Distances: 8 km – Junior men (7.858 km)
- Participation: 106 athletes from 28 nations

The Junior men's race at the 2017 IAAF World Cross Country Championships was held at the Kampala in Uganda, on March 26, 2017.

The exact length of the course was 7,858 m (33m start, 3 full laps of 2,000 m and a final lap of 1,825m).

Complete results for individuals.

== Race results ==
=== Junior men's race (8 km) ===
==== Individual ====
Rank	Athlete	Country	Time
1st place, gold medalist(s)	Jacob Kiplimo	Uganda	22:40
2nd place, silver medalist(s)	Amdework Walelegn	Ethiopia	22:43
3rd place, bronze medalist(s)	Richard Yator	Kenya	22:52
4	Betesfa Getahun	Ethiopia	22:58
5	Selemon Barega	Ethiopia	23:03
6	Tefera Mosisa	Ethiopia	23:04
7	Amos Kirui	Kenya	23:04
8	Edwin Kiplangat Bett	Kenya	23:10
9	Yemane Haileselassie	Eritrea	23:18
10	Wesley Ledama	Kenya	23:25
11	Filmon Ande	Eritrea	23:28
12	Bayelign Teshager	Ethiopia	23:35
13	Aimen Boulainine	Algeria	23:36
14	Solomon Berihu	Ethiopia	23:38
15	Ronald Kiprotich Kirui	Kenya	24:00
16	Kevin Kibet	Uganda	24:02
17	Abraha Kokob	Eritrea	24:06
18	Meshack Munguti Nzula	Kenya	24:26
19	Victor Kiplangat	Uganda	24:29
20	Mehari Tsegay	Eritrea	24:30
21	Hicham Akankam	Morocco	24:35
22	Robel Sibhatu	Eritrea	24:36
23	Mathew Job Chekurui	Uganda	24:37
24	Titus Given Kwemoi	Uganda	24:50
25	Kabelo Seboko	South Africa	24:54
26	Anouar Ouzine	Morocco	24:59
27	Francis Damiano Damasi	Tanzania	25:03
28	Kazuya Nishiyama	Japan	25:15
29	Mouhcine Outalha	Morocco	25:19
30	Daniel Do Nascimento	Brazil	25:21
31	Pakiso Mthembu	South Africa	25:25
32	Mario García	Spain	25:26
33	Omar Ramos	Peru	25:29
34	Paul Roberts	United States	25:31
35	Ramadhani Juma Hamisi	Tanzania	25:36
36	Kbashi Mohamedkhir Ahmed	Sudan	25:38
37	Elisha Dosla Wema	Tanzania	25:41
38	Yoji Sakai	Japan	25:41
39	Suolangcairen	China	25:43
40	Edwar Condori	Peru	25:46
41	Mohamed Bali	Morocco	25:48
42	Joshua Elisante Sulle	Tanzania	25:49
43	Ryunosuke Chigira	Japan	25:52
44	Sam Stevens	Great Britain	25:53
45	Elisha Chemutai	Uganda	25:55
46	Anthiny Dosla Wema	Tanzania	25:55
47	Aidan Reed	Canada	25:55
48	Scott Beattie	Great Britain	26:01
49	Kieren Tall	Australia	26:04
50	Yohana Elisante Sulle	Tanzania	26:05
51	Miguel González	Spain	26:10
52	Sodai Shimizu	Japan	26:11
53	Hamza Ali	United States	26:14
54	Fouad Aboud	Algeria	26:14
55	Kieran Lumb	Canada	26:21
56	David Lean	Australia	26:24
57	Abdelkarim Ben Zahra	Morocco	26:27
58	Tumi Lephotho	South Africa	26:29
59	Alec Haines	United States	26:29
60	Dorin-Andrei Rusu	Romania	26:33
61	Jonathan Shields	Great Britain	26:36
62	Isaac Harding	United States	26:37
63	Jonathan Del Razo	Mexico	26:39
64	Kagiso Kebatshwaretse	Botswana	26:40
65	Jean-Simon Desgagnés	Canada	26:42
66	Zach Facioni	Australia	26:48
67	Edward Trippas	Australia	26:51
68	Ryan Mphahlele	South Africa	26:57
69	Joshua Phillips	Australia	26:57
70	Hugo Milner	Great Britain	26:58
71	Yorlin Canchanya	Peru	27:07
72	Alexis Phelut	France	27:07
73	Ali Djoudar	Algeria	27:08
74	Adrián Ben	Spain	27:15
75	Ilyas Raji	Morocco	27:16
76	Callum McClusky	Australia	27:19
77	Dais Malebana	South Africa	27:21
78	Mitchell Ubene	Canada	27:21
79	Keita Yoshida	Japan	27:23
80	Braulio Villalva	Peru	27:24
81	Luke Prior	Great Britain	27:24
82	Arturo Reyna	Mexico	27:25
83	Rochdi Bouchekhchoukha	Algeria	27:26
84	Andrew Alexander	Canada	27:27
85	Graham Baird	Canada	27:27
86	Daou Aboubacar	Comoros	27:37
87	Gavin Parpart	United States	27:55
88	Benjamin Davies	Great Britain	28:02
89	Adam Yousif	Sudan	28:03
90	Ouassim Oumaiz	Spain	28:09
91	Seif Eddine Hazam	Algeria	28:16
92	Dumo Mkwananzi	Zimbabwe	28:19
93	Mohamed Abdaljalil Mohamed	Sudan	28:31
94	Gidown Mohamed Eisa	Sudan	28:36
95	Said Mechaal	Spain	28:38
96	Ahamada Azad	Comoros	30:09
97	Andrew Kpehe	Liberia	30:14
98	Peter Alkhoury	Lebanon	30:18
99	Yousif Ahmed Makeen	Sudan	30:22
100	Abdullah Al-Qwabani	Yemen	30:32
101	Abdullah Abdullah	Kuwait	37:57
—	Ahmad Al Chor	Lebanon	DNF
—	Waleed Alfailakawi	Kuwait	DNF
—	Almontaser Hamieh	Lebanon	DNF
—	Yousef Nadoum	Kuwait	DNF
—	Mutlaq Alazemi	Kuwait	DNS

==== Teams ====
Rank	Team	Points
1st place, gold medalist(s)	Ethiopia: Amdework Walelegn / 2; Betesfa Getahun / 4; Selemon Barega / 5; Tefera Mosisa / 6; (Bayelign Teshager) / (12); (Solomon Berihu) / (14)	17
2nd place, silver medalist(s)	Kenya: Richard Yator / 3; Amos Kirui / 7; Edwin Kiplangat Bett / 8; Wesley Ledama / 10; (Ronald Kiprotich Kirui) / (15); (Meshack Munguti Nzula) / (18)	28
3rd place, bronze medalist(s)	Eritrea: Yemane Haileselassie / 9; Filmon Ande / 11; Abraha Kokob / 17; Mehari Tsegay / 20; (Robel Sibhatu) / (22)	57
4	Uganda: Jacob Kiplimo / 1; Kevin Kibet / 16; Victor Kiplangat / 19; Mathew Job Chekurui / 23; (Titus Given Kwemoi) / (24); (Elisha Chemutai) / (45)	59
5	Morocco: Hicham Akankam / 21; Anouar Ouzine / 26; Mouhcine Outalha / 29; Mohamed Bali / 41; (Abdelkarim Ben Zahra) / (57); (Ilyas Raji) / (75)	117
6	Tanzania: Francis Damiano Damasi / 27; Ramadhani Juma Hamisi / 35; Elisha Dosla Wema / 37; Joshua Elisante Sulle / 42; (Anthiny Dosla Wema) / (46); (Yohana Elisante Sulle) / (50)	141
7	Japan: Kazuya Nishiyama / 28; Yoji Sakai / 38; Ryunosuke Chigira / 43; Sodai Shimizu / 52; (Keita Yoshida) / (79)	161
8	South Africa: Kabelo Seboko / 25; Pakiso Mthembu / 31; Tumi Lephotho / 58; Ryan Mphahlele / 68; (Dais Malebana) / (77)	182
9	United States: Paul Roberts / 34; Aidan Reed / 47; Hamza Ali / 53; Alec Haines / 59; (Isaac Harding) / (62); (Gavin Parpart) / (87)	193
10	Great Britain: Sam Stevens / 44; Scott Beattie / 48; Jonathan Shields / 61; Hugo Milner / 70; (Luke Prior) / (81); (Benjamin Davies) / (88)	223
11	Algeria: Aimen Boulainine / 13; Fouad Aboud / 54; Ali Djoudar / 73; Rochdi Bouchekhchoukha / 83; (Seif Eddine Hazam) / (91)	223
12	Peru: Omar Ramos / 33; Edwar Condori / 40; Yorlin Canchanya / 71; Braulio Villalva / 80	224
13	Australia: Kieren Tall / 49; David Lean / 56; Zach Facioni / 66; Edward Trippas / 67; (Joshua Phillips) / (69); (Callum McClusky) / (76)	238
14	Spain: Mario García / 32; Miguel González / 51; Adrián Ben / 74; Ouassim Oumaiz Errouch / 90; (Said Mechaal) / (95)	247
15	Canada: Kieran Lumb / 55; Jean-Simon Desgagnés / 65; Mitchell Ubene / 78; Andrew Alexander / 84; (Graham Baird) / (85)	282
16	Sudan: Kbashi Mohamedkhir Ahmed / 36; Adam Yousif / 89; Mohamed Abdaljalil Mohamed / 93; Gidown Mohamed Eisa / 94; (Yousif Ahmed Makeen) / (99)	312

- Note: Athletes in parentheses did not score for the team result.

== See also ==
- 2017 IAAF World Cross Country Championships – Junior women's race
- 2017 IAAF World Cross Country Championships – Senior men's race
- 2017 IAAF World Cross Country Championships – Senior women's race
- 2017 IAAF World Cross Country Championships – Mixed relay
