= Janeth Chepngetich =

Kenyan track and field athlete

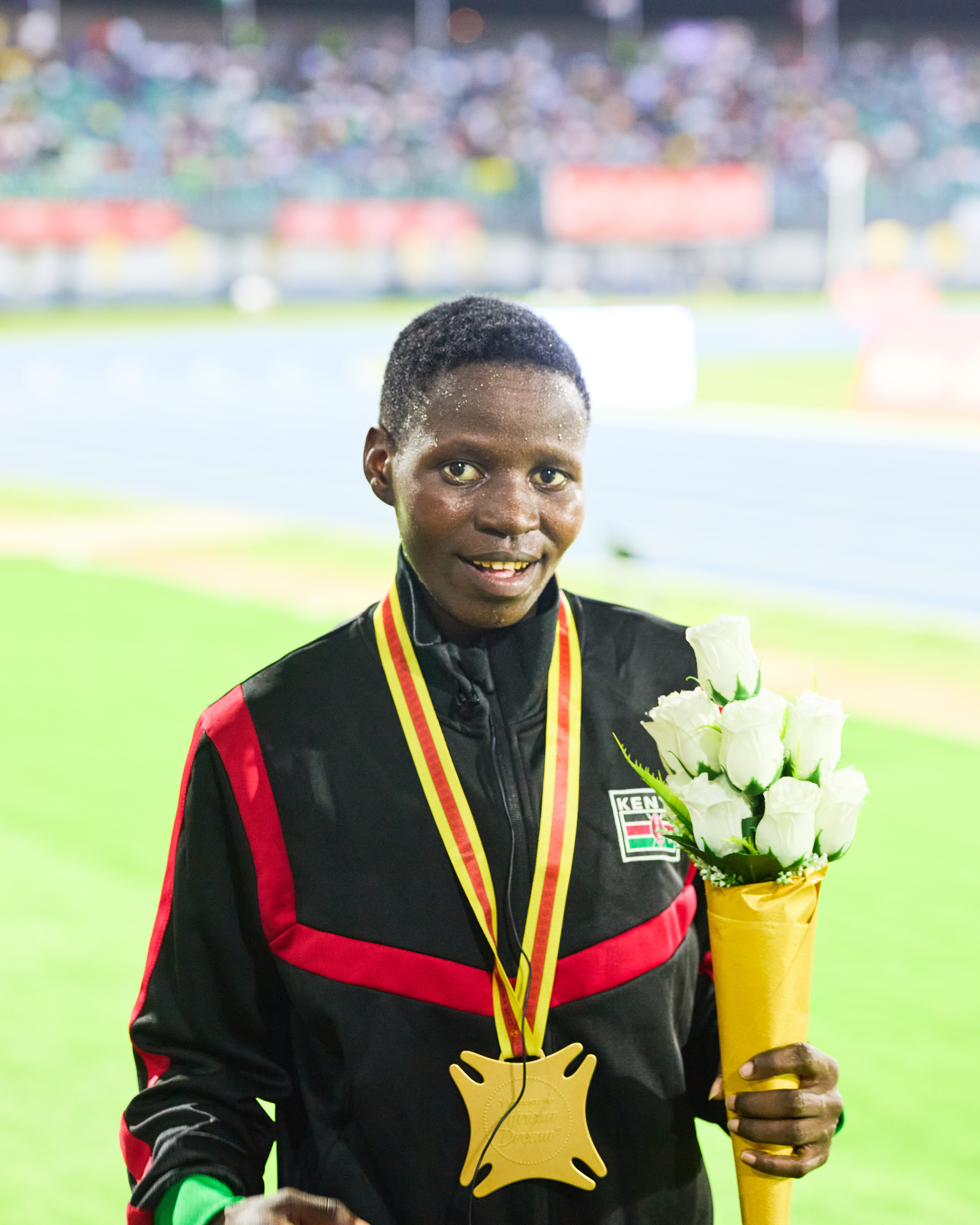
- Chepngetich at the African Games 2023

Personal information
- Nationality: Kenyan
- Born: 23 July 1998 (age 28) Keringet

Sport
- Sport: Athletics
- Event: Long-distance running

Achievements and titles
- Personal bests: 3000m: 8:23.48 (Lausanne, 2024); 5000m: 14:40.25 (Eugene, 2025); 10,000m: 30:04.97 (Eugene, 2024); Road; 5km: 14:55 (Herzogenaurach, 2025); 10km: 29:55 (Valencia, 2024); Half marathon: 1:05:15 (Valencia, 2023)
Medal record
Women's athletics
Representing Kenya
African Games
| Gold medal – first place | 2023 Accra | 10,000 m |

Janeth Chepngetich (born 23 July 1998) is a Kenyan long-distance runner. She won the 10,000 metres race at the 2023 African Games.

== Early and personal life ==
She is from Keringet, Nakuru County in the Kenyan Rift Valley, the same town as world record breaking athlete, Faith Kipyegon. Country Championships. She later joined the Willy Langat coached training group that includes Brenda Jepchirchir, in Keringet.

== Career ==
Competing as a junior in 2015, she was an Africa Youth 1500m bronze medalist. She subsequently competed over that distance at the 2015 World Youth Championships in Athletics in Cali, Colombia.

She set a women's course record in winning the Udine half marathon in 2022, in a time of 1:08.24. She was runner-up at the Prague half marathon in April 2023. In September 2023, again running on the road, she won the women's Birell 10 km Race in Prague, in a time of 30:21. In January 2024, she finished fourth at the Valencia 10k in a time of 29:55. In March 2024, she won gold in the 10,000 metres at the African Games in a time of 33:37.00.

On 22 February 2025, she finished second at the Sirikwa Classic, the World Athletics Cross Country Tour Gold meeting in Eldoret. She placed fourth over 5000 metres at the 2025 Miami Slam, part of the 2025 Grand Slam Track season, running 14:46.14. She ran a personal best 14:40.25 for the 5000 metres at the 2025 Prefontaine Classic on 5 July. She won the Kenyan World Championships Trials later that month over 10,000 meters in 30:27.02, finishing ahead of Agnes Ngetich and Beatrice Chebet. In September, she competed over 10,000 metres at the 2025 World Championships in Tokyo, Japan, but despite entering the race as world leader in the event, was unable to finish the race.

== Statistics ==
Grand Slam Track results
| Slam | Race group | Event | Pl. | Time | Prize money |
|---|---|---|---|---|---|
| 2025 Miami Slam | Long distance | 5000 m | 4th | 14:46.16 | US$25,000 |
| 2025 Miami Slam | Long distance | 3000 m | 6th | 8:37.06 | US$25,000 |
