= Wede Kefale =

Ethiopian long-distance runner

Personal information
- Born: 2 March 2000 (age 26)

Sport
- Country: Ethiopia
- Sport: Long-distance running
- Events: 10,000 m, Half Marathon

Achievements and titles
- Personal bests: 10,000 m: 31:02.43 (Nerja 2024); Road; 5 km: 15:22 (Lille 2023); 10 km: 30:19 (Castellón 2025); 20 km: 1:11:26 (Cassis 2023); Half Marathon: 1:05:21 (Copenhagen 2025)
Medal record
Women's athletics
Representing Ethiopia
African Games
Silver medal – second place	2023 Accra	10,000 m

Wede Kefale (born 2 March 2000) is an Ethiopian long-distance runner who won the silver medal at the 10,000 m distance 2023 African Games which took place in 2024. She also represented Ethiopia at the 2023 World Athletics Cross Country Championships placing 15th and placed 3rd in the 2025 Copenhagen Half Marathon.
