= Wakana Kabasawa =

Japanese middle-distance and long-distance runner

Personal information
- Born: 24 March 1999 (age 27) Gunma Prefecture, Japan
- Education: Keio University

Sport
- Sport: Athletics
- Events: Middle-distance running Long-distance running

Wakana Kabasawa (樺沢 和佳奈, Kabasawa Wakana; born 24 March 1999) is a Japanese athlete who specialises in Middle-distance and Long-distance running. She represented her country at the 2024 Summer Olympics.

== International competitions ==
Year	Competition	Venue	Position	Event	Notes
Representing Japan
2024	Summer Olympics	Paris, France	19th (h)	5000 m	15:50.86
