= Rosefline Chepngetich =

Kenyan steeplechase runner

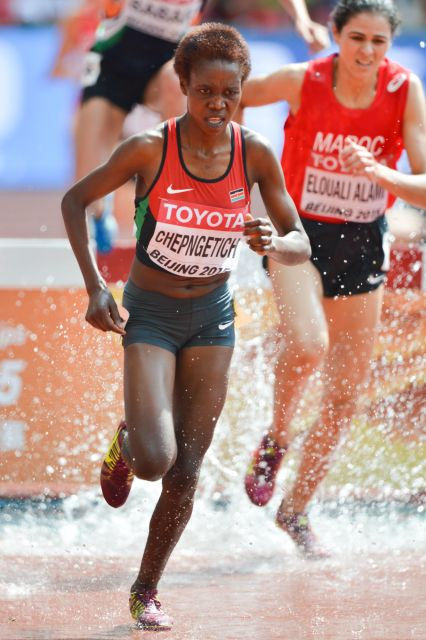
- Rosefline Chepngetich during the 2015 World Championships in Athletics

Personal information
- Born: 17 June 1997 (age 29) Rift Valley Province, Kenya

Sport
- Country: Kenya
- Sport: Athletics
- Event: Steeplechase

Rosefline Chepngetich (born 17 June 1997) is a Kenyan steeplechase runner. She holds a personal best of 9:35.75 minutes for the 3000 metres steeplechase and is ranked third on the all-time youth lists for the 2000 m steeplechase distance.

In the youth category she was a gold medallist at the World Youth Championships, Youth Summer Olympics and the African Youth Games. She was a silver medallist at World Junior level.

== Career ==
Born in Rift Valley Province and raised in Keringet, she attended Keringet Winners Girls High School and began training as a steeplechase specialist under her coach Charles Ng'eno. She quickly established herself among the world's best young steeplechasers by running a time of 6:12.0 minutes for the 2000 metres steeplechase in Nairobi in 2013, moving up to third on the all-time lists for the event. She won the gold medal in that event at the 2013 World Youth Championships in Athletics, running 6:14.60 minutes (the fourth fastest time ever) to defeat her compatriot Daisy Jepkemei. It was her second gold medal for Kenya that year, as she was a team winner at the 2013 IAAF World Cross Country Championships, where she placed seventh individually at age fifteen. A fourth-place finish in the junior race at the 2014 African Cross Country Championships brought her another team gold.

Chepngetich won two gold medals in the 2000 mm steeplechase in the 2014, taking the title at the 2014 African Youth Games before winning at the 2014 Summer Youth Olympics (holding off Ethiopia's Zewdenesh Mamo both times). She held the world's four fastest times for the event that year. In the junior ranks she won the Kenyan junior title then moved into the top twenty of all-time for the 3000 m steeplechase with a run of 9:40.28 minutes to claim the silver medal at the 2014 World Junior Championships in Athletics, where she was only behind Ruth Jebet.

She returned to grass for the 2015 World Cross Country junior race, but the Kenyan team was well-beaten by the Ethiopians and Chepngetich came twelfth as part of the silver medal-winning team. A third-place finish in a steeplechase personal best of 9:35.75 minutes at the 2015 Athletics Kenya World Championship Trials brought her her first senior national selection.

In 2017 Chepngetich was suspended for 8 months after she failed a drug test.

== Personal bests ==
- 2000 metres steeplechase – 6:12.0 min (2013)
- 3000 metres steeplechase – 9:08.23 min (2018)
- 5000 metres – 16:07.0 min (2012)

== International competitions ==
Year	Competition	Venue	Position	Event	Notes
2013	World Cross Country Championships	Bydgoszcz, Poland	7th	Junior race	18:21
2013	World Cross Country Championships	Bydgoszcz, Poland	1st	Junior team	14 pts
2013	World Youth Championships	Donetsk, Ukraine	1st	2000 m s'chase	6:14.60
2014	African Cross Country Championships	Kampala, Uganda	4th	Junior race	19:39.71
2014	African Cross Country Championships	Kampala, Uganda	1st	Junior team	13 pts
2014	African Youth Games	Gaborone, Botswana	1st	2000 m s'chase	6:21.81
2014	World Junior Championships	Eugene, United States	2nd	3000 m s'chase	9:40.28
2014	Youth Olympics	Nanjing, China	1st	2000 m s'chase	6:22.67
2015	World Cross Country Championships	Guiyang, China	12th	Junior race	20:38
2015	World Cross Country Championships	Guiyang, China	2nd	Junior team	33 pts
2015	World Championships	Beijing, China	15th	3000 m s'chase	9:46.08
