= Sheila Chelangat =

Kenyan female long-distance runner

Personal information
- National team: Kenya
- Born: April 11, 1998 (age 28)

Sheila Chelangat (born 11 April 1998) is a Kenyan long-distance runner. She won the bronze medal in the 3000m at the 2015 World Youth Championships in Athletics, but experienced injuries and loss of form in the following years.

Chelangat won the Kenyan national cross country championship in 2020 and 2021. She trains in Kericho, coached by Gabriel Kiptanui.

She qualified to represent Kenya at the 2020 Summer Olympics.

Chelangat is serving a six-year doping ban from May 2025 after testing positive for EPO.
