= Janat Chemusto =

Ugandan athlete (born 1998)

Personal information
- Full name: Janat Chemusto
- Nationality: Ugandan
- Born: 5 July 1998 (age 27) Kapchorwa

Sport
- Sport: Athletics
- Position: Middle and long distance running

Janat Chemusto (born 5 July 1998) is a Ugandan middle-distance runner who won a bronze medal in the 2014 Commonwealth Youth Games 3000-meter race . She also won a silver medal in Paris at the Mile Women Finals having crossed the line in the 4:23.65. She clinched victory in the 1,500 meters at the Kip Keino Classic in Nairobi, posting a personal best of 4:01.79, a time that qualified her for the World Championships in Budapest. She also a bronze medal at the FBK Games in the Netherlands with a time of 4:01.98.

== Career ==
Chemusto's international debut came in 2014 at the African Youth Games in Gaborone, Botswana where she finished fourth in the 3000 meters with a time of 9:36.94. She also competed in the 2014 Summer Youth Olympics in Nanjing, China securing a seventh-place finish in the same event with a time of 9:22.42. In 2015, at the African Youth Championships in Réduit, Chemusto earned a silver medal in the 1500 meters, clocking 4:17.61.

During the same year at the World Cross Country Championships in Guiyang, she finished 18th in the U20 race with a time of 21:10 minutes. She then finished tenth in the 3000 meters at the World Youth Championships in Cali in 9:42.88 minutes. She won bronze medals in the 1500 and 3000 meters at the Commonwealth Youth Games in Apia in 4:19.48 minutes and 9:56.62 minutes, respectively. In 2017, at the World Cross Country Championships in Kampala, Uganda, she finished 23rd in the U20 race with a time of 20:54 minutes and won a bronze medal in the team rankings. In 2022, she placed fifth in the 1500 meters at the African Championships in Port Louis with a time of 4:21.36 minutes and eighth in the 5000 meters with a time of 16:38.76. She then finished fourth in the 1500 and 5000 meters at the Islamic Solidarity Games in Konya, finishing in 4:16.72 and 16:59.9 minutes, respectively.

== Controversies ==
In 2023, Chemusto was tested for the steroid hormone nandrolone and the result was positive. She was subsequently banned by the Athletics Integrity Unit (AIU) for four years, retroactive to July 2023, and all her results from May 13, 2023, were revoked.

== Personal bests ==
- 800 meters: 2:06.86 min, June 25, 2022 in Kampala
- 1500 meters: 4:15.90 min, March 3, 2018 in Kampala
- 3000 meters: 9:10.74 min, August 20, 2014 in Nanjing
- 5000 meters: 15:49.84 min, March 3, 2018 in Kampala

== See also ==
- Sarah Chelangat
- Belinda Chemutai
- Prisca Chesan
- Jacob Kiplimo
