= Jan Meda International Cross Country =

Cross country running competition in Ethiopia

- Date: January/February
- Location: Addis Ababa, Ethiopia
- Event type: Cross country
- Distance: 10 km for men and women 8 km for junior men 6 km for junior women (–2016); 12 km for men 8 km for women

The Jan Meda International Cross Country is an annual cross country running competition held at the Jan Meda Race Course in Addis Ababa, Ethiopia. Typically held in January or February, the event serves as the national championship for Ethiopia and doubles as the national trials for the World Athletics Cross Country Championships.

Matching the world programme, the Jan Meda International holds four races, with senior and junior (under-20) races for both sexes. Similarly, the event featured a senior men's and women's short race over 4 km from 1998 to 2006, when that was a World Championship distance.

The same race course venue is used for the municipal Addis Ababa championships and the national cross country clubs championships. The 2004 and 2009 editions of the national championships doubled as the East African Cross Country Championships. The 2021, 2022 and 2023 editions were held in Sululta.

== Past senior race winners ==
| Edition | Year | Men's winner | Time (m:s) | Women's winner | Time (m:s) |
|---|---|---|---|---|---|
| 13th | 1996 | Habte Jifar | 36:30 | Derartu Tulu | 20:55 |
| 14th | 1997 | ? | ? | ? | ? |
| 15th | 1998 | ? | ? | ? | ? |
| 16th | 1999 | Tesfaye Tola | 36:20 | Gete Wami | 27:50 |
| 17th | 2000 | ? | ? | Derartu Tulu | ? |
| 18th | 2001 | Dejene Berhanu | ? | Gete Wami | ? |
| 19th | 2002 | Haile Gebrselassie | 35:42 | Leila Aman | ? |
| 20th | 2003 | Gebregziabher Gebremariam | 35:32.10 | Werknesh Kidane | 27:02.82 |
| 21st | 2004 | Gebregziabher Gebremariam | 36:52.64 | Werknesh Kidane | 28:14.44 |
| 22nd | 2005 | Abebe Dinkesa | 35:17 | Tirunesh Dibaba | 26:46 |
| 23rd | 2006 | Abebe Dinkesa | 35:30 | Meselech Melkamu | 27:54 |
| 24th | 2007 | Tadese Tola | 35:13.21 | Meselech Melkamu | 26:51.71 |
| 25th | 2008 | Abebe Dinkesa | ? | Gelete Burka | 25:15 |
| 26th | 2009 | Gebregziabher Gebremariam | 35:16 | Wude Ayalew | 27:18 |
| 27th | 2010 | Azmeraw Bekele | 37:23 | Meselech Melkamu | 27:36 |
| 28th | 2011 | Hunegnaw Mesfin | 32:20 | Meselech Melkamu | 21:23 |
| 29th | 2012 | ? | ? | ? | ? |
| 30th | 2013 | Feyisa Lilesa | 34:36 | Hiwot Ayalew | 26:22 |
| 31st | 2014 | Yassin Hassen | 35:20.4 | Genet Yalew | 25:37.9 |
| 32nd | 2015 | Tamirat Tola | 35:08 | Genet Yalew | 26:09 |
| 33rd | 2016 | Getaneh Molla | 35:37 | Enatnesh Alamrew Tirusew | 27:27 |
| 34th | 2017 | Getaneh Molla | 30:57 | Dera Dida | 35:28 |
| 35th | 2018 | Enyew Mekonnen | 31:01 | Enatnesh Alamrew Tirusew | 35:32 |
| 36th | 2019 | Mogos Tuemay | 31:16 | Dera Dida | 35:50 |
| 37th | 2020 | Nibret Melak | 30:58 | Tsigie Gebreselama | 35:07 |
| 38th | 2021 | Nibret Melak | 30:09 | Zewditu Aderaw | 34:49 |
| 39th | 2022 | Berihu Aregawi | 31፡57.65 | Gete Alemayehu | 36፡34.57 |
| 40th | 2023 | Berihu Aregawi | 30:45 | Letesenbet Gidey | 35:22 |

=== Short race ===
| Year | Men's winner | Women's winner |
|---|---|---|
| 1998 | ? | ? |
| 1999 | Hailu Mekonnen | Gete Wami |
| 2000 | ? | ? |
| 2001 | Hailu Mekonnen | Werknesh Kidane |
| 2002 | Kenenisa Bekele | Werknesh Kidane |
| 2003 | Hailu Mekonnen | Tirunesh Dibaba |
| 2004 | Dejene Berhanu | Werknesh Kidane |
| 2005 | Dejene Berhanu | Meselech Melkamu |
| 2006 | Ali Abdosh | Gelete Burka |

== See also ==
- African Cross Country Championships
