= Peter Wheeler =

Peter Wheeler may refer to:

- Peter Edward Lionel Russell (1913–2006), né Wheeler, British historian
- Peter Wheeler (broadcaster) (1934–2010), British broadcaster
- Peter Wheeler (rugby union) (born 1948), English rugby union footballer
- Peter Wheeler (TVR) (1944–2009), British chemical engineer, owner of TVR sports car company
- Peter Wheeler (politician) (1922–2015), Georgia Commissioner
- Peter Wheeler (runner) (born 1994), New Zealand long-distance runner
