= 2019 IAAF World Cross Country Championships – Junior women's race =

Junior women's race at the 2019 IAAF World Cross Country Championships
- Organisers: IAAF
- Edition: 43rd
- Date: March 30
- Host city: Aarhus, Denmark
- Events: 1
- Distances: 6 km – Junior women (5.915 km)
- Participation: 144 athletes from 49 nations

The Junior women's race at the 2019 IAAF World Cross Country Championships was held at the Aarhus in Denmark, on March 30, 2019. Beatrice Chebet from Kenya won the gold medal edging Ethiopian runners Alemitu Tariku and Tsigie Gebreselama. All three medalists finished so tightly, they all were given the same finish time of 20:50. Even 4th place Ugandan Sarah Chelangat was within a second of the winner.

== Race results ==
=== Junior women's race (6 km) ===
==== Individual ====
Rank	Athlete	Country	Time
1st place, gold medalist(s)	Beatrice Chebet	Kenya	20:50
2nd place, silver medalist(s)	Alemitu Tariku	Ethiopia	20:50
3rd place, bronze medalist(s)	Tsigie Gebreselama	Ethiopia	20:50
4	Sarah Chelangat	Uganda	20:51
5	Girmawit Gebrzihair	Ethiopia	20:53
6	Betty Chepkemoi Kibet	Kenya	21:03
7	Mizan Alem	Ethiopia	21:09
8	Wede Kefale	Ethiopia	21:14
9	Jackline Chepwogen Rotich	Kenya	21:17
10	Lydia Jeruto Lagat	Kenya	21:44
11	Meselu Berhe	Ethiopia	21:46
12	Mercy Chepkorir Kirarei	Kenya	21:49
13	Mercy Jerop	Kenya	21:54
14	Ayuka Kazama	Japan	21:58
15	Ririka Hironaka	Japan	22:00
16	Lauren Carey	Australia	22:02
17	Kirstie Rae	New Zealand	22:02
18	Yanli Zhao	China	22:05
19	Esther Yeko Chekwemoi	Uganda	22:11
20	Prudence Sekgodiso	South Africa	22:15
21	Chika Kosakai	Japan	22:18
22	Hazuki Doi	Japan	22:21
23	Nadia Battocletti	Italy	22:24
24	Rebecca Chelangat	Uganda	22:25
25	Grace Brock	Great Britain	22:27
26	Annet Chesang	Uganda	22:29
27	Carmie Prinsloo	South Africa	22:43
28	Delia Sclabas	Switzerland	22:43
29	Miku Sakai	Japan	22:45
30	Taryn O'Neill	Canada	22:45
31	Makenna Fitzgerald	Canada	22:46
32	Angela Mattevi	Italy	22:53
33	Hikari Ohnishi	Japan	22:54
34	Phoebe Mcknight	New Zealand	22:55
35	Amelia Samuels	Great Britain	22:57
36	Youssra Hennou	Morocco	22:57
37	Anne Forsyth	Canada	22:58
38	Lucinda Crouch	Australia	23:02
39	Gené Coetzee	South Africa	23:04
40	Charlotte Wood	Canada	23:08
41	Anastazia Dolomongo Ng'ombengeni	Tanzania	23:08
42	Sarah Schiffmann	Australia	23:11
43	Laura Valgreen Petersen	Denmark	23:12
44	Becky Briggs	Great Britain	23:12
45	Hasnaa Tiskart	Morocco	23:14
46	Danielle Verster	South Africa	23:17
47	Brogan Macdougall	Canada	23:18
48	Alexandra Yatzimirsky	France	23:20
49	Charlotte Alexander	Great Britain	23:20
50	Manon Trapp	France	23:21
51	Eloise Walker	Great Britain	23:22
52	Houda Ahteou	Morocco	23:28
53	Savannah Shaw	United States	23:29
54	Emilie Girard	France	23:32
55	Olimpia Breza	Poland	23:32
56	Leah Chelangat	Uganda	23:33
57	Olivia Mason	Great Britain	23:34
58	Ana Egler	France	23:35
59	Cara Du Preez	South Africa	23:45
60	Grace Ping	United States	23:45
61	Sophie Søefeldt	Denmark	23:48
62	Hasnae Goulamzi	Morocco	23:50
63	Aisha Lubuna Magelani	Tanzania	23:51
64	Elia Saura	Spain	23:51
65	Ting Zeng	China	23:52
66	Maggie Smith	Canada	23:54
67	Meiru Kang	China	24:01
68	Marta Martinez	Spain	24:03
69	Kristine Mygind Sørensen	Denmark	24:04
70	Nicole Clermont	United States	24:07
71	Danu Flores	Peru	24:10
72	Abbey Caldwell	Australia	24:12
73	Maria Nieves Campos	Spain	24:13
74	Heidi Nielson	United States	24:13
75	Kayla Smith	United States	24:15
76	Carla Arce	Spain	24:18
77	Milena Pyka	Poland	24:22
78	Maite Gonzalez	Spain	24:26
79	Ivanna Kukh	Ukraine	24:30
80	Nikita Moore	Australia	24:32
81	Anna Mark Helwigh	Denmark	24:37
82	Lamyae Himi	Morocco	24:42
83	Maria Lucineida Da Silva	Brazil	24:43
84	Rilee Rigdon	United States	24:49
85	Jinyu Wang	China	24:57
86	Georgiana Cosmina Spiridon	Romania	24:59
87	Inocencia Huacasi	Peru	25:04
88	Tessa Hunt	New Zealand	25:12
89	Augusta Marie Grønberg Christensen	Denmark	25:13
90	Liz Campos	Peru	25:16
91	Jeovana Fernanda Santos	Brazil	25:33
92	Mie Gam	Denmark	25:45
93	Isabella Richardson	New Zealand	25:50
94	Alejandra Sierra	Colombia	25:51
95	Madina Kerimova	Kazakhstan	26:11
96	Bianca Vitoria Esquerdo Dos Santos	Brazil	26:12
97	Emesa Melki	Lebanon	26:20
98	Damaris Yauri	Peru	26:29
99	Samantha Corbett	New Zealand	26:38
100	Farah El Tayar	Lebanon	30:49
-	Leticia Almeida Belo	Brazil	DNF
-	Meryeme Azrour	Morocco	DNF

== See also ==
- 2019 IAAF World Cross Country Championships – Senior men's race
- 2019 IAAF World Cross Country Championships – Senior women's race
- 2019 IAAF World Cross Country Championships – Junior men's race
- 2019 IAAF World Cross Country Championships – Mixed relay
