= Ben Preisner =

Canadian long-distance runner (born 1996)

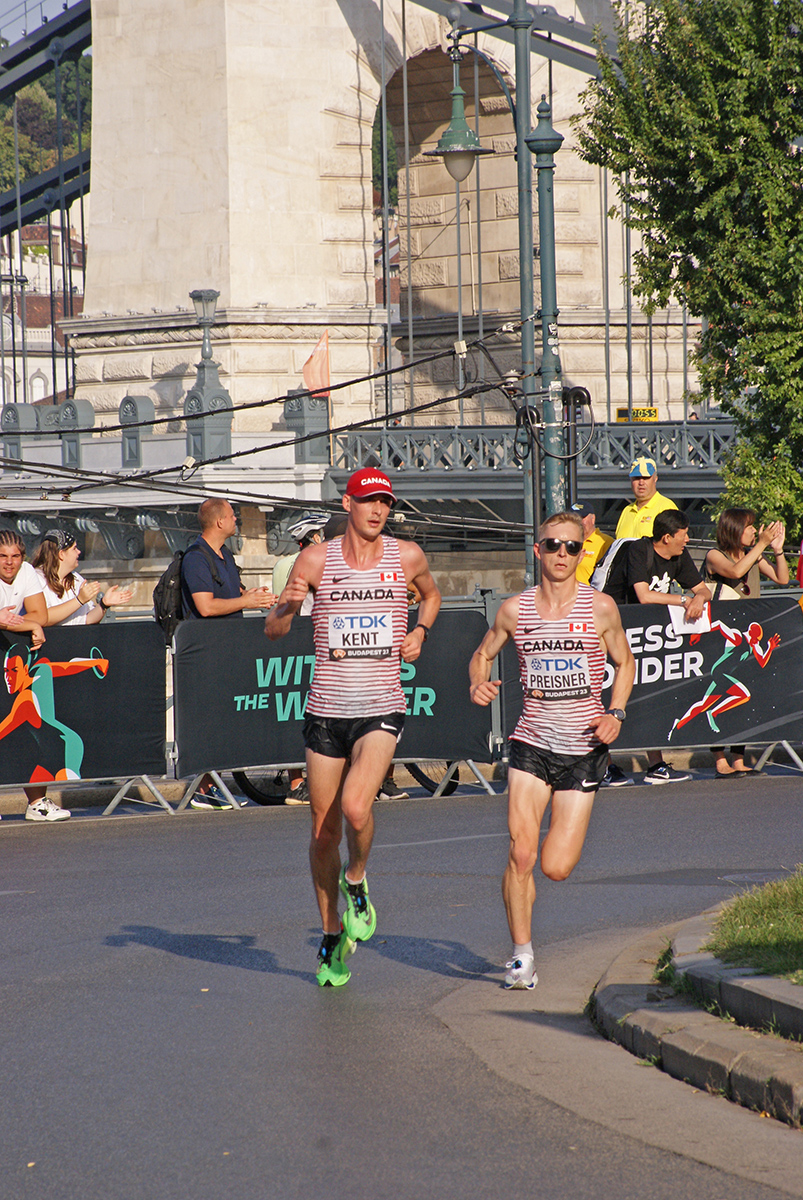
- Justin Kent and Preisner in 2023

Personal information
- Born: 22 March 1996 (age 30) Oakville, Ontario, Canada
- Home town: Milton, Ontario, Canada
- Education: University of Tulsa
- Height: 178 cm (5 ft 10 in)
- Weight: 60 kg (132 lb)

Sport
- Country: Canada
- Sport: Long-distance running
- Position: Marathon Runner
- University team: Tulsa Golden Hurricane

Achievements and titles
- Personal bests: Outdoor; 3000 m: 8:30.35 (Mississauga 2014); 5000 m: 14:04.94 (Des Moines, Iowa 2017); 3000 m s’chase: 8:49.44 (Palo Alto, CA 2017); 10,000 m: 29:08.17 (Palo Alto, California 2018); 10-mile run: 48:18 (Hamilton, Ontario 2019); Marathon: 2:08:58 (Ōita Prefecture 2024)

Ben Preisner (born 22 March 1996 in Oakville, Ontario) is a Canadian long-distance runner.

He competed at the collegiate level for the University of Tulsa where he studied chemical engineering.

In 2019, he competed in the senior men's race at the 2019 IAAF World Cross Country Championships held in Aarhus, Denmark. He finished in 77th place.

Following delays caused by the COVID-19 pandemic, Preisner ran 2:10:17 in his debut marathon in the Marathon Project 2020 in Chandler, Arizona, over a minute faster than the Olympic standard of 2:11:30. As a result, he was nominated to represent Canada in the marathon event at the 2020 Summer Olympics in Tokyo, Japan. Competing in Tokyo, he ran a time of 2:19:27 to finish in forty-sixth place, the highest placement among the three Canadian competitors.
