= Yohei Komatsu (runner) =

Japanese long-distance runner

Personal information
- Born: 2 November 1997 (age 28)

Sport
- Country: Japan
- Sport: Long-distance running

Yohei Komatsu (born 2 November 1997) is a Japanese long-distance runner. In 2019, he competed in the senior men's race at the 2019 IAAF World Cross Country Championships held in Aarhus, Denmark. He finished in 92nd place.
