= Marco Monko =

Tanzanian long-distance runner

Personal information
- Born: 13 November 1997 (age 27)

Sport
- Country: Tanzania
- Sport: Long-distance running

Marco Monko (born 13 November 1997) is a Tanzanian long-distance runner. In 2019, he competed in the senior men's race at the 2019 IAAF World Cross Country Championships held in Aarhus, Denmark. He finished in 52nd place. He finished in 9th place in the mixed relay event.
