= Juan Huaman =

Peruvian long-distance runner

Personal information
- Born: 12 June 1981 (age 44)

Sport
- Country: Peru
- Sport: Long-distance running

Juan Huaman (born 12 June 1981) is a Peruvian long-distance runner.

In 2019, he competed in the senior men's race at the 2019 IAAF World Cross Country Championships held in Aarhus, Denmark. He finished in 120th place.
