= Said Sulaymanov =

Kazakhstani long-distance runner

Personal information
- Born: 22 April 1998 (age 27)

Sport
- Country: Kazakhstan
- Sport: Long-distance running

Said Sulaymanov (born 22 April 1998) is a Kazakhstani long-distance runner.

In 2019, he competed in the senior men's race at the 2019 IAAF World Cross Country Championships held in Aarhus, Denmark. He finished in 129th place.
