= Lisbon Half Marathon =

Annual half-marathon in Lisbon, Portugal

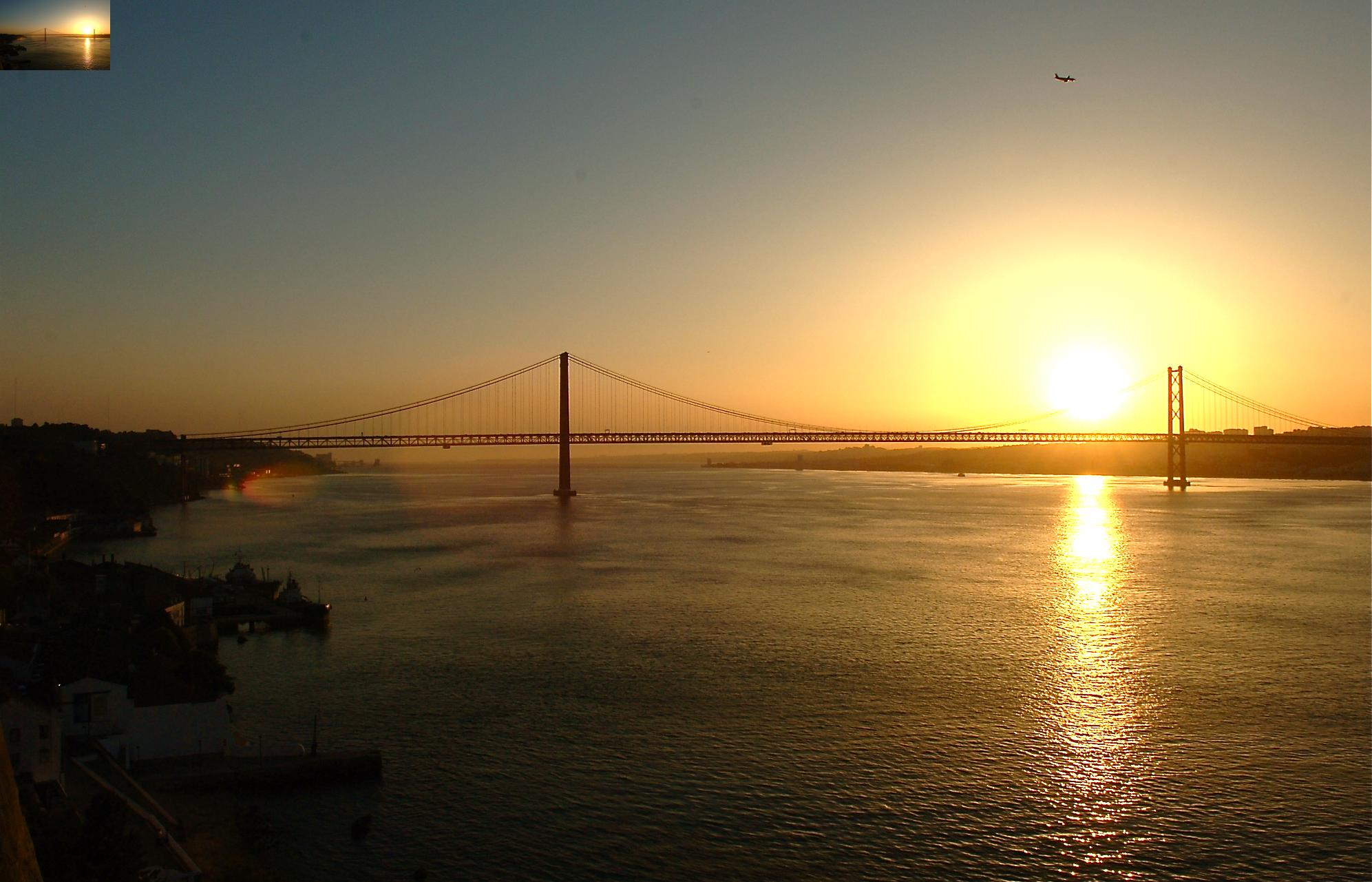
- The mass race begins by crossing the Ponte 25 de Abril bridge
- Date: March
- Location: Lisbon, Portugal
- Event type: Road
- Distance: Half marathon
- Primary sponsor: EDP
- Established: 1991
- Course records: Men's: 57:20 (2026) (Uganda) Jacob Kiplimo; Women's: 1:04:21 (2025) (Ethiopia) Tsigie Gebreselama
- Website: Lisbon Half Marathon
- Participants: 7793 finishers (2022); 5,424 finishers (2021); 15,692 (2019)

EDP Lisbon Half Marathon is an annual international half marathon competition which is contested every March in Lisbon, Portugal. It carries World Athletics Elite Label Road Race status. The men's course record of 57:20 was set by Jacob Kiplimo in 2026, which was the world record for the half marathon distance until August of that year. Kenyan runners have been very successful in the competition, accounting for over half of the total winners, with Tegla Loroupe taking the honours in the women's race on six occasions. The Lisbon Half Marathon is not to be confused with Luso Portugal Half Marathon, another prominent half marathon race which is also held in Lisbon in October.

== History ==
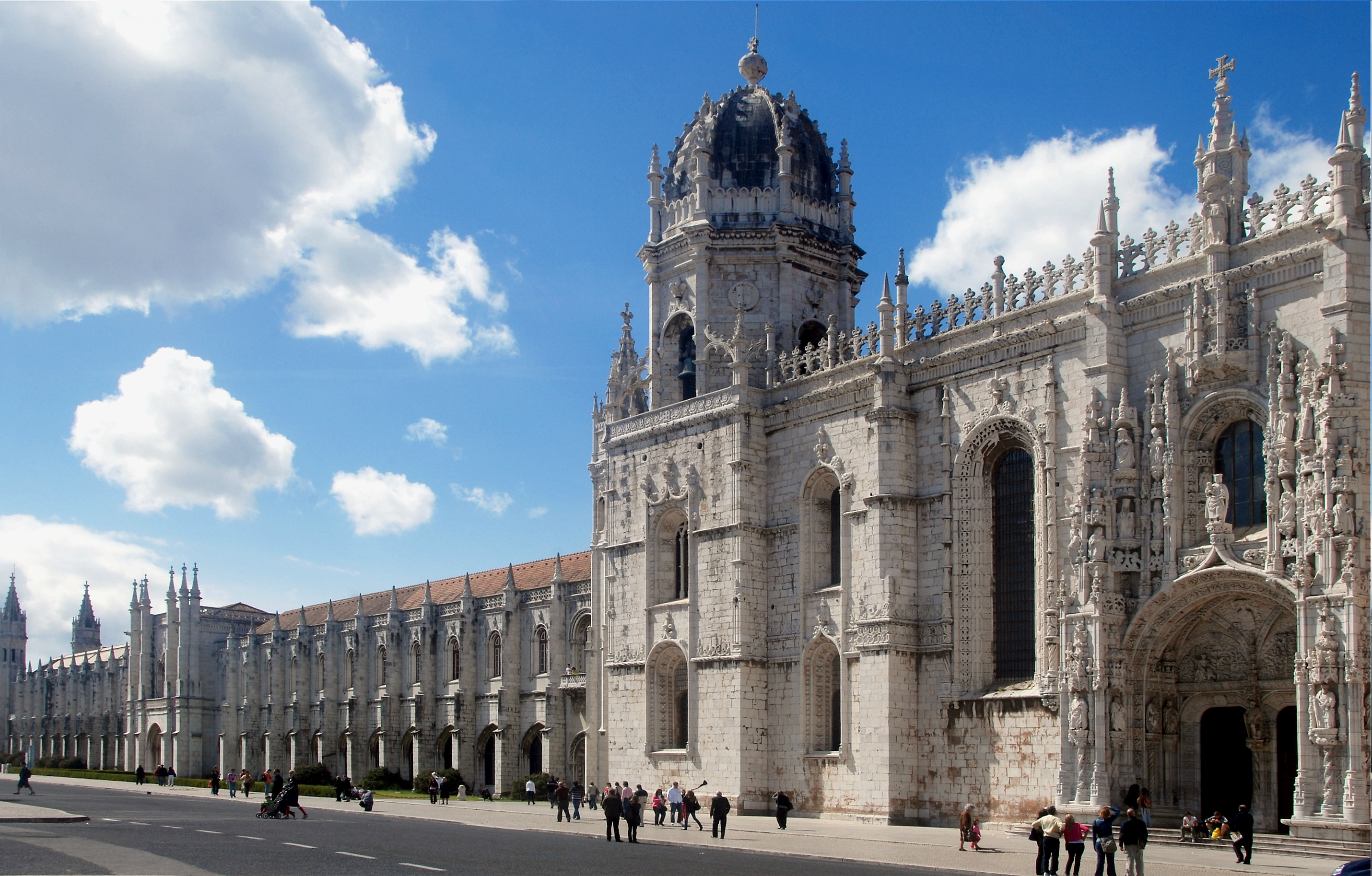
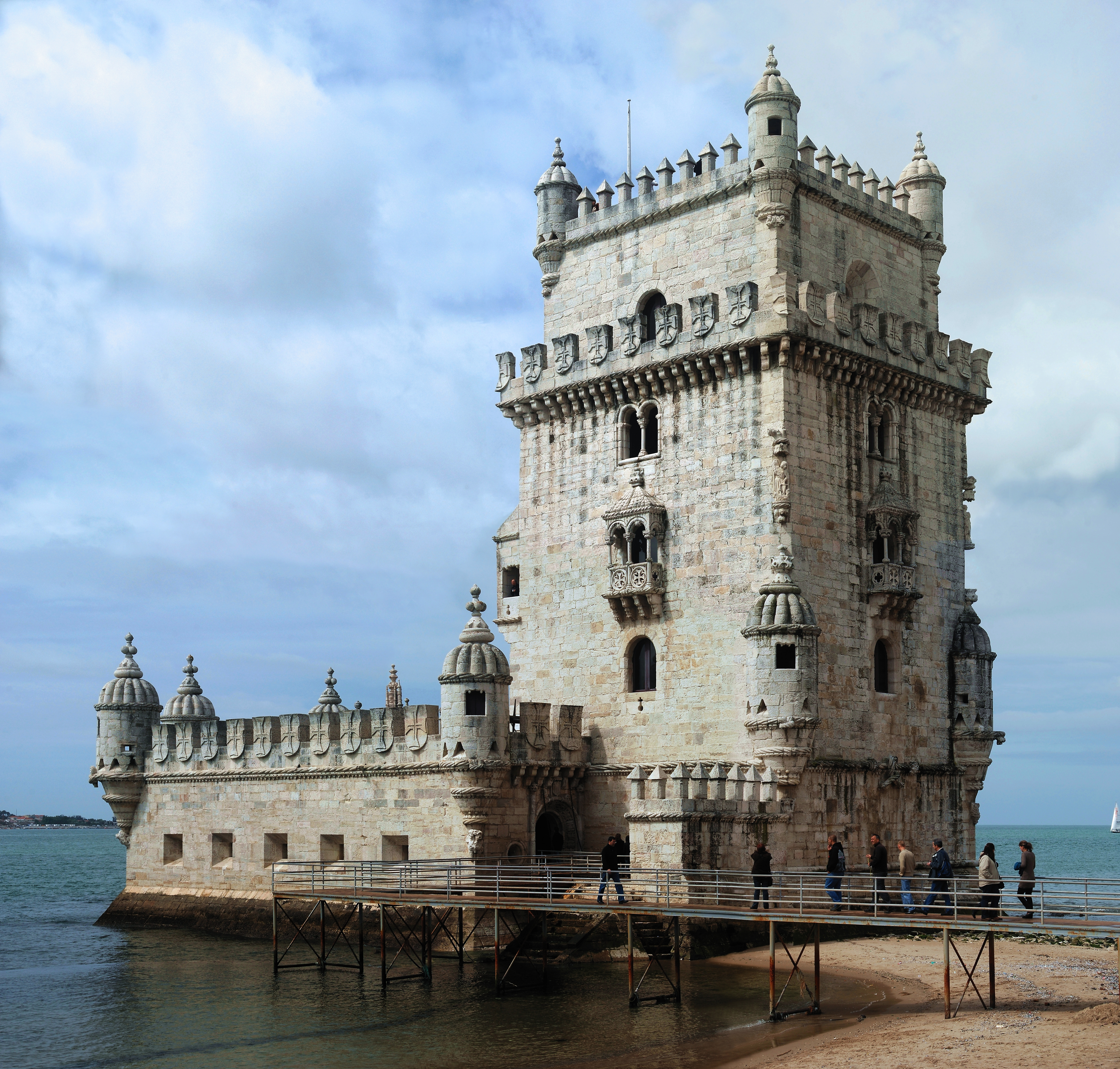
The course passes the Jerónimos Monastery (left) and the Belém Tower

First held in 1991, the race has consistently delivered fast winning times. However, many of these times have been unratifiable for record purposes due to factors including: the course being too short (1991–93), excessive tailwinds, as well as there being an excessive drop in altitude, which boosted athletes' performances (1996, 1998, 2000–01, 2004, and 2006).

The course was judged as non-permissible for records until 2008, in which year the organisers changed the elite course to allow for records. The new course begins at sea level on the north side of the river Tagus, a change which made the course entirely flat. The course for the mass participation race, which has attracted almost 30,000 runners in previous years, remained unchanged and begins by crossing the Ponte 25 de Abril suspension bridge before linking up with the new elite course.

The current elite course of the half marathon begins in a small town on the north bank of the Tagus, no longer crossing the bridge, and the course is wide and flat from there on. Heading eastwards towards the city centre, the course passes the docks and traces a route alongside much of the city's historical architecture, including the Belém Tower and Jerónimos Monastery.

From 2008 onwards, the organisers set aside a €50,000 prize pot for any athlete breaking the world record over the half marathon distance. This led to the participation of a number of prominent athletes, with marathon world record holder Haile Gebrselassie winning the 2008 edition, while Charles Kamathi and Robert Kipkoech Cheruiyot followed behind. Another strong field was assembled in 2010 and Zersenay Tadese of Eritrea broke both the 20 kilometres and half marathon world records in his winning run.

The competition also hosts a mini marathon race, which has featured many prominent Portuguese citizens, including the former President of Portugal Jorge Sampaio, and José Socrates, the Portuguese Prime Minister. Energias de Portugal has sponsored the competition for a number of years.

The 2020 edition of the race was first postponed to 2020.09.06, and then to 2021.05.09, due to the coronavirus pandemic.

== Winners ==
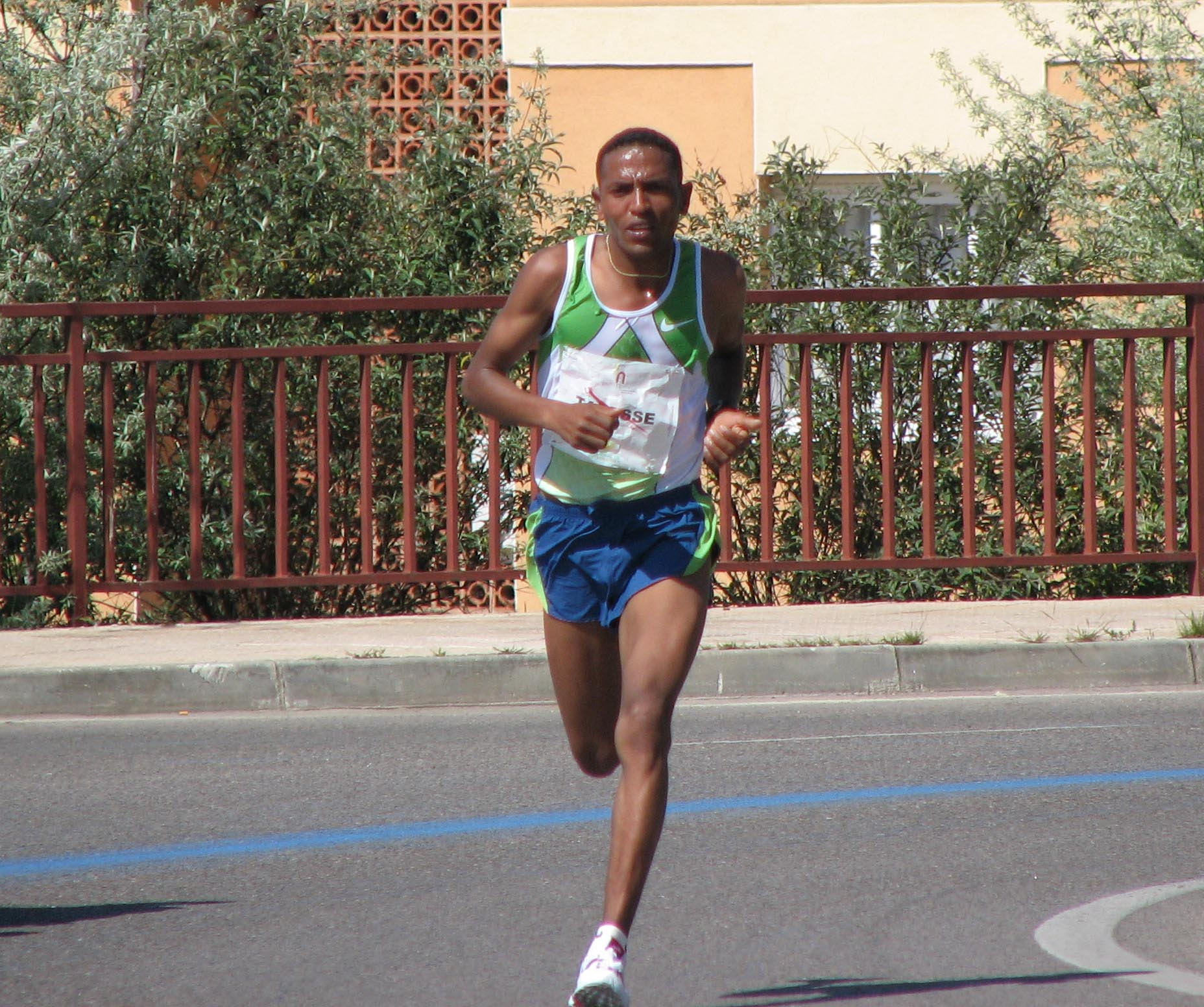
Zersenay Tadese broke the world record in 2010.

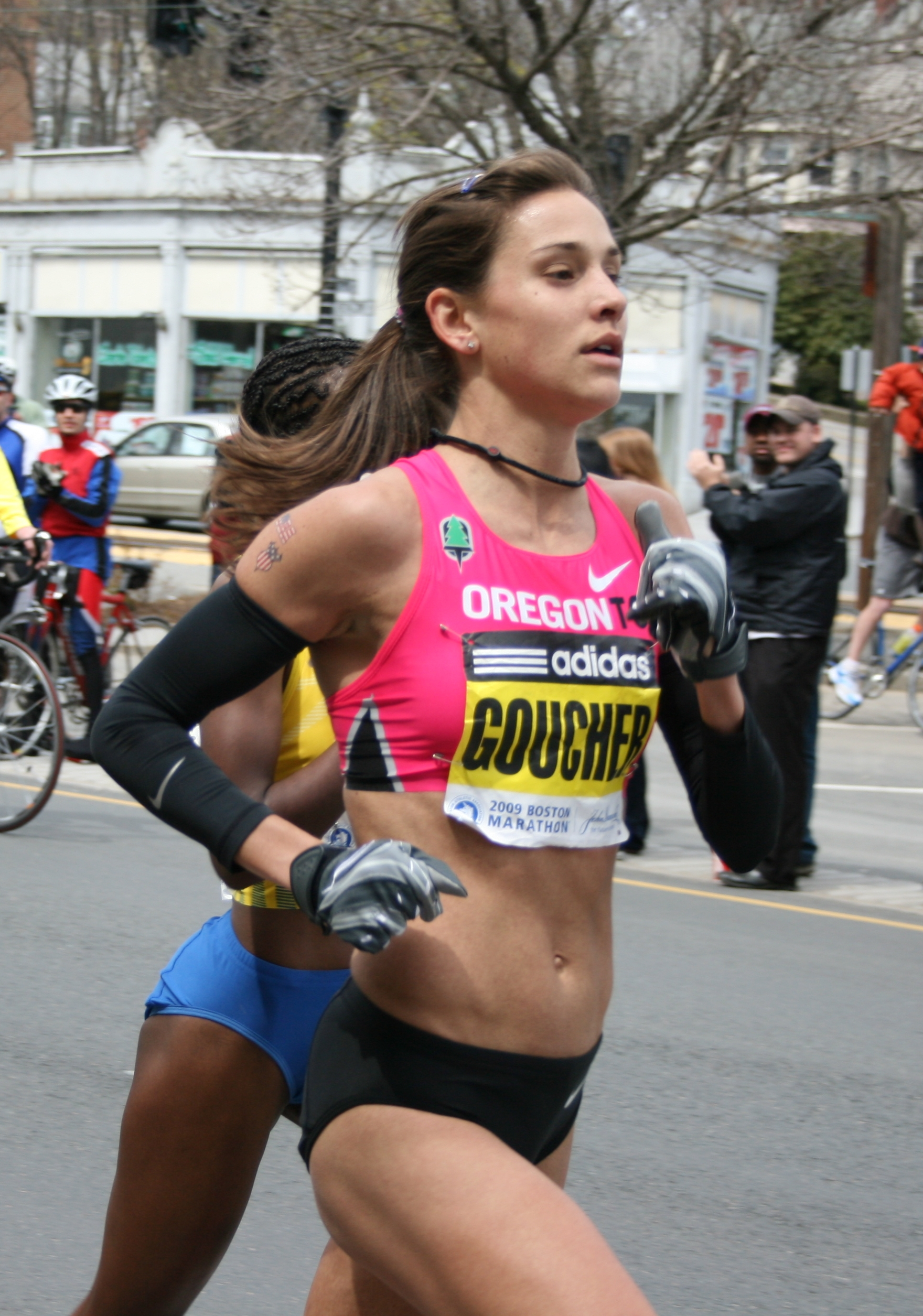
Kara Goucher won the women's race in 2009.

Key: Course record Short or assisted course

Year	Men's winner	Nationality	Time (h:m:s)	Women's winner	Nationality	Time (h:m:s)
2026	Jacob Kiplimo	Uganda	57:20	Tsigie Gebreselama	Ethiopia	1:04:48
2025	Abdi Waiss	Djibouti	59:44	Tsigie Gebreselama	Ethiopia	1:04:21
2024	Dinkalem Ayele	Ethiopia	1:00:36	Brigid Kosgei	Kenya	1:05:51
2023	Nibret Melak	Ethiopia	59:06	Almaz Ayana	Ethiopia	1:05:30
2022	Kenneth Renju	Kenya	1:00:13	Brigid Kosgei	Kenya	1:06:46
2021	Jacob Kiplimo	Uganda	57:31	Daisy Cherotich	Kenya	1:06:15
2020	postponed to 2021 due to COVID-19 pandemic in Portugal					
2019	Mosinet Geremew	Ethiopia	59:37	Vivian Cheruiyot	Kenya	1:06:34
2018	Eric Kiptanui	Kenya	1:00:05	Etagegn Woldu	Ethiopia	1:11:27
2017	Jake Robertson	New Zealand	1:00:01	Mare Dibaba	Ethiopia	1:09:43
2016	Sammy Kitwara	Kenya	59:47	Ruti Aga	Ethiopia	1:09:16
2015	Mo Farah	United Kingdom	59:32	Rose Chelimo	Kenya	1:08:22
2014	Bedan Karoki	Kenya	59:58	Worknesh Degefa	Ethiopia	1:08:46
2013	Bernard Koech	Kenya	59:54	Edna Kiplagat	Kenya	1:08:48
2012	Zersenay Tadese	Eritrea	59:34	Shalane Flanagan	United States	1:08:52
2011	Zersenay Tadese	Eritrea	58:30	Aberu Kebede	Ethiopia	1:08:28
2010	Zersenay Tadese	Eritrea	58:23	Peninah Arusei	Kenya	1:08:38
2009	Martin Lel	Kenya	59:56	Kara Goucher	United States	1:08:30
2008	Haile Gebrselassie	Ethiopia	59:15	Salina Kosgei	Kenya	1:09:57
2007	Robert Kipchumba	Kenya	1:00:31	Rita Jeptoo	Kenya	1:07:05
2006	Martin Lel	Kenya	59:30	Salina Kosgei	Kenya	1:07:52
2005	Paul Tergat	Kenya	59:10	Susan Chepkemei	Kenya	1:08:49
2004	Rodgers Rop	Kenya	59:49	Joyce Chepchumba	Kenya	1:08:11
2003	Martin Lel	Kenya	1:00:10	Derartu Tulu	Ethiopia	1:09:20
2002	Haile Gebrselassie	Ethiopia	59:41	Susan Chepkemei	Kenya	1:08:23
2001	Hendrick Ramaala	South Africa	1:00:26	Susan Chepkemei	Kenya	1:05:44
2000	Paul Tergat	Kenya	59:06	Tegla Loroupe	Kenya	1:07:23
1999	Japhet Kosgei	Kenya	1:00:01	Tegla Loroupe	Kenya	1:07:52
1998	António Pinto	Portugal	59:43	Catherina McKiernan	Ireland	1:07:50
1997	Mohammed Mourhit	Belgium	1:01:17	Tegla Loroupe	Kenya	1:09:01
1996	Clement Kiprotich	Kenya	1:01:15	Tegla Loroupe	Kenya	1:07:12
1995	Simon Lopuyet	Kenya	1:00:26	Tegla Loroupe	Kenya	1:08:21
1994	Andrés Espinosa	Mexico	1:01:34	Tegla Loroupe	Kenya	1:09:27
1993	Sammy Lelei	Kenya	59:24	Nadezhda Ilyina	Russia	1:09:47
1992	Tendai Chimusasa	Zimbabwe	1:01:17	Heléna Barócsi	Hungary	1:10:01
1991	Paul Evans	England	1:01:44	Rosa Mota	Portugal	1:09:52

== Statistics ==
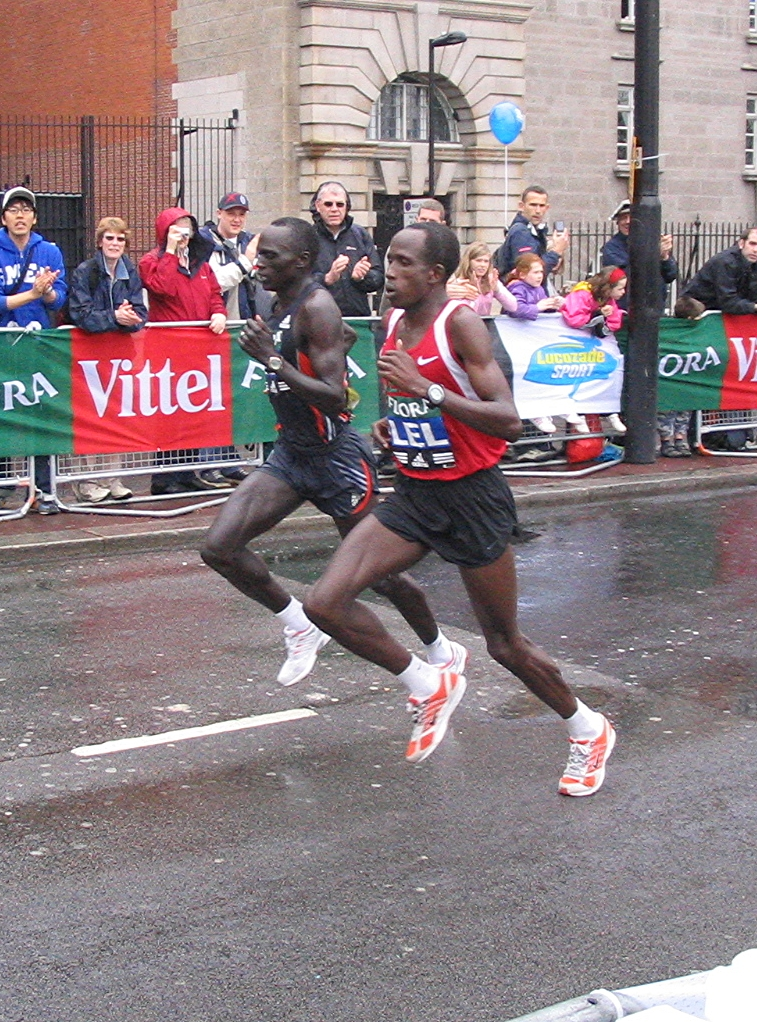
Martin Lel (right) is historically the most successful male runner of the competition

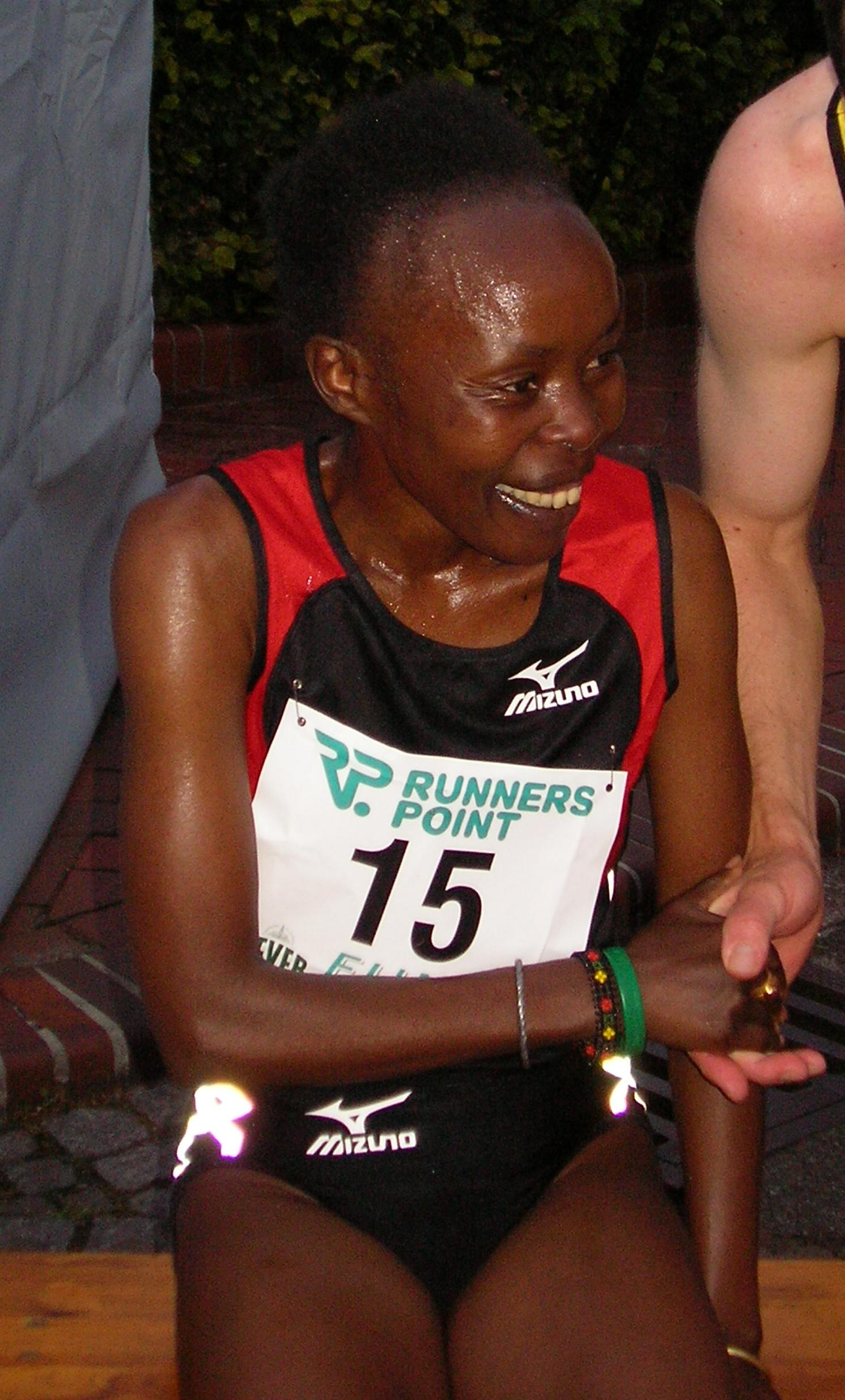
Tegla Loroupe is a six-time winner of the race.

=== Winners by country ===
Country	Men's race	Women's race	Total
Kenya	16	18	34
Ethiopia	5	10	15
Eritrea	3	0	3
Portugal	1	1	2
United States	0	2	2
Belgium	1	0	1
England	1	0	1
Hungary	0	1	1
Ireland	0	1	1
Mexico	1	0	1
Russia	0	1	1
South Africa	1	0	1
Zimbabwe	1	0	1
United Kingdom	1	0	1
New Zealand	1	0	1
Uganda	1	0	1
Djibouti	1	0	1

=== Multiple winners ===
Athlete	Country	Wins	Years
Tegla Loroupe	Kenya	6	1994, 1995, 1996, 1997, 1999, 2000
Susan Chepkemei	Kenya	3	2001, 2002, 2005
Martin Lel	Kenya	3	2003, 2006, 2009
Paul Tergat	Kenya	2	2000, 2005
Zersenay Tadese	Eritrea	3	2010, 2011, 2012
Haile Gebrselassie	Ethiopia	2	2002, 2008
Salina Kosgei	Kenya	2	2006, 2008
Tsehay Gemechu	Ethiopia	2	2021, 2022

== See also ==
- Lisbon Marathon
- Portugal Half Marathon
