= 2019 IAAF World Cross Country Championships – Mixed relay =

Senior mixed relay race at the 2019 World Athletics Cross Country Championships
- Organisers: World Athletics
- Edition: 43rd
- Date: 30 March 2019
- Host city: Bathurst (Australia)
- Events: 1
- Distances: 8 km – Senior mixed relay
- Participation: 40 athletes from 10 nations

The mixed relay race of the 2019 IAAF World Cross Country Championships was run in Aarhus in Denmark on 30 March 2019, with 10 teams of four athletes each, two men and two women, taking part.

== Results ==
The race began at 11:01 local time.

After the race, Morocco and China were disqualified for handing over the timing wristband (used as a relay baton) outside the designated takeover zone. Morocco were reinstated after an appeal.

Rank	Nation and competitors	Time	Note
1st place, gold medalist(s)	Ethiopia: Kebede Endale; Bone Cheluke; Teddese Lemi; Fantu Worku	25:49	
2nd place, silver medalist(s)	Morocco: Soufiane El Bakkali; Kaoutar Farkoussi; Abdelaati Iguider; Rababe Arafi	26:22	
3rd place, bronze medalist(s)	Kenya: Conseslus Kipruto; Jarinter Mawia Mwasya; Elijah Motonei Manangoi; Winfred Nzisa Mbithe	26:29	
4	United States: Kirubel Erassa; Shannon Osika; Jordan Mann; Eleanor Fulton	27:01	
5	Uganda: Docus Ajok; Daniel Kiprop; Sylvia Chelangat; Ronald Musagala	27:35	
6	Spain: Víctor Ruiz; Cristina Espejo; Artur Bossy; Esther Guerrero	27:47	
7	Canada: Kevin Robertson; Regan Yee; Erica Digby; Justin Kent	27:57	
8	Denmark: Andreas Lindgreen; Dagmar Fæster Olsen; Laura Glans; Nick Jensen	28:47	
9	Tanzania: Yohana Elisante Sulle; Sisilia Ginoka Panga; Mayselina Issa Mbua; Marco Monko	28:48	
	China: Xinyan Zhang; Amu Mao; Xiaoqian Zhong; Yuxi Luo		DQ

== See also ==
- 2017 IAAF World Cross Country Championships – Mixed relay
- 2019 IAAF World Cross Country Championships
  - Senior men's race
  - Senior women's race
  - Junior men's race
  - Junior women's race
