= Zhoodar Kochkonbaev =

Kyrgyzstani long-distance runner

Personal information
- Born: 24 April 1995 (age 30)

Sport
- Country: Kyrgyzstan
- Sport: Long-distance running

Zhoodar Kochkonbaev (born 24 April 1995) is a Kyrgyzstani long-distance runner.

In 2019, he competed in the senior men's race at the 2019 IAAF World Cross Country Championships held in Aarhus, Denmark. He finished in 127th place.
