= Yusuke Tamura =

Japanese long-distance runner

Personal information
- Born: 23 December 1998 (age 27)

Sport
- Country: Japan
- Sport: Long-distance running

Yusuke Tamura (田村 友佑, Tamura Yūsuke; born 23 December 1998) is a Japanese long-distance runner. In 2019, he competed in the senior men's race at the 2019 IAAF World Cross Country Championships held in Aarhus, Denmark. He finished in 74th place.
