= Theophile Bigirimana =

Rwandan long-distance runner

Personal information
- Born: 1 January 1993 (age 32)

Sport
- Country: Rwanda
- Sport: Long-distance running

Theophile Bigirimana (born 1 January 1993) is a Rwandan long-distance runner.

In 2019, he competed in the senior men's race at the 2019 IAAF World Cross Country Championships held in Aarhus, Denmark. He finished in 47th place.
