= Tholego Keitshekile =

Botswana long-distance runner

Personal information
- Born: 13 October 1993 (age 32)

Sport
- Country: Botswana
- Sport: Long-distance running

Tholego Keitshekile (born 13 October 1993) is a long-distance runner from Botswana.

In 2019, he competed in the senior men's race at the 2019 IAAF World Cross Country Championships held in Aarhus, Denmark. He finished in 140th place.
