= Canisious Nyamutsita =

Zimbabwean long-distance runner

Personal information
- Born: 14 July 1991 (age 34)

Sport
- Country: Zimbabwe
- Sport: Long-distance running

Canisious Nyamutsita (born 14 July 1991) is a Zimbabwean long-distance runner.

In 2019, he competed in the senior men's race at the 2019 IAAF World Cross Country Championships held in Aarhus, Denmark. He finished in 87th place.
