= Justin Kent =

Canadian long-distance runner

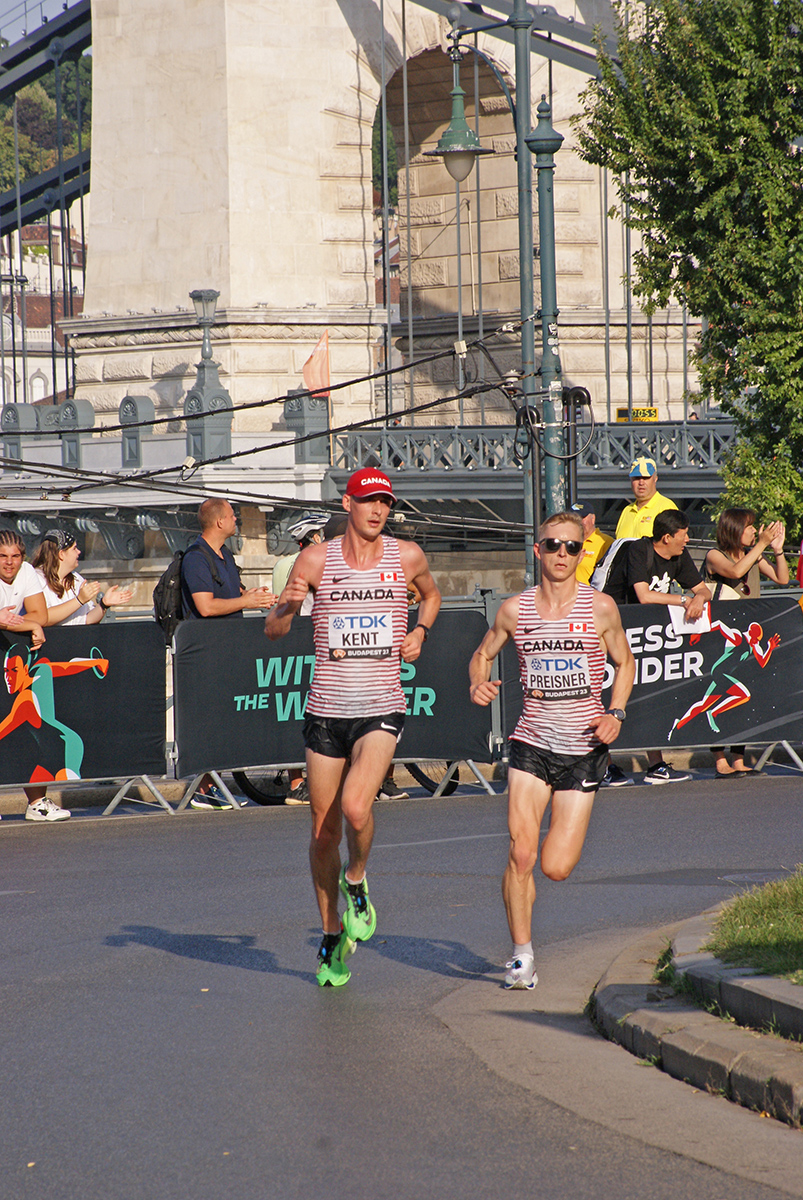
- Kent and Ben Preisner in 2023

Personal information
- Born: April 30, 1992 (age 34) Surrey, British Columbia, Canada
- Education: University of British Columbia

Sport
- Sport: Athletics
- Event: Marathon
- University team: UBC Thunderbirds
- Club: Mile2Marathon

Achievements and titles
- Personal bests: Half marathon: 1:02:48 (San José 2022); Marathon: 2:12:17 (Toronto 2024)

Justin Kent (born 30 April 1992) is a Canadian long-distance runner. In the marathon, he holds personal best of 2:09:29 and represented Canada at the 2023 World Athletics Championships in Budapest, and 2025 World Athletics Championships in Tokyo.

== Athletics career ==
After graduating from Kwantlen Park Secondary School in Surrey, British Columbia, Kent enrolled at the University of British Columbia where he would compete for the UBC Thunderbirds.

As a Thunderbird, Kent specialized in the 3000 metres steeplechase, culminating in a NAIA title in 2014 and a bronze medal performance in 2015.

In 2019, he represented Canada at the World Cross Country Championships in the mixed relay, finishing seventh as part of a team including Kevin Robertson, Regan Yee, and Erica Digby.

=== Marathon ===
The following year, he made his debut in the marathon, running 2:17:22 at the Marathon Project in Chandler, Arizona. His next marathon came on December 5, 2021, where he finished just off his personal best, running 2:17:29.

In 2022, improved upon that time, finished sixth at the Ottawa Marathon in 2:13:34. The following spring, Kent competed at the 2023 Prague Marathon, running a lifetime best of 2:13:07. These performances qualified Kent to compete in the marathon at the 2023 World Athletics Championships in Budapest. At worlds, he ran much of the race alongside training partner and fellow Canadian Ben Preisner. Amidst humid conditions, he finished 29th in 2:15:26.

== Competition record ==
Representing Canada and British Columbia (WCSG and CSG)
Year	Competition	Venue	Position	Event	Time
2011	Western Canada Summer Games	Kamloops, British Columbia	8th	3000 m	9:10.87
2011	Western Canada Summer Games	Kamloops, British Columbia	2nd	3000 m steeplechase	9:37.26
2013	Canada Summer Games	Sherbrooke, Quebec	3rd	3000 m steeplechase	9:10.89
2017	Jeux de la Francophonie	Abidjan, Cote d'Ivoire	15th (h)	1500 m	3:58.63
2019	World Cross Country Championships	Århus, Denmark	7th	Mixed relay	27:57
2023	World Championships	Budapest, Hungary	29th	Marathon	2:15:26
2023	World Road Running Championships	Riga, Latvia	N/A	Half marathon	DNF
2025	World Championships	Tokyo, Japan	35th	Marathon	2:17:12
