= Edward Mwanza =

Zambian long-distance runner

Personal information
- Born: 10 March 1989 (age 37)

Sport
- Country: Zambia
- Sport: Long-distance running
Medal record
Men's athletics
Representing Zambia
African Southern Region Championships
Gold medal – first place	2013 Gaborone	5000 m
Gold medal – first place	2013 Gaborone	10,000 m

Edward Mwanza (born 10 March 1989) is a Zambian long-distance runner. He competed at the World Cross Country Championships in 2013, 2015 and 2019.

Mwanza competed for the Green Buffaloes athletics club. He was considered the best Zambian 10,000 metres runner in the 2010s, winning the 2012 Zambian Athletics Championships titles over 5000 m and 10,000 m, until he was beaten by Jackson Kashiya in 2023. Mwanza also won gold medals in the 5000 m and 10,000 m at the 2013 African Southern Region Athletics Championships in Gaborone.

At the 2015 IAAF World Cross Country Championships in China, Mwanza finished in 56th place. His performance was described as "competitive" despite camping disadvantages compared to other African countries.

Mwanza also had a successful road running career, placing 2nd at the 2016 and 2017 Lafarge Marathon 21 km races.

In 2019, he competed in the senior men's race at the 2019 IAAF World Cross Country Championships held in Aarhus, Denmark. He finished in 112th place.
