= Joshua Baan =

New Zealand long-distance runner

Personal information
- Born: 31 August 1995 (age 30)

Sport
- Country: New Zealand
- Sport: Long-distance running

Joshua Baan (born 31 August 1995) is a New Zealand long-distance runner.

In 2019, he competed in the senior men's race at the 2019 IAAF World Cross Country Championships held in Aarhus, Denmark. He finished in 128th place.
