= General Wheeler =

General Wheeler may refer to:

- Daniel D. Wheeler (1841–1916), U.S. Army brigadier general
- Earle Wheeler (1908–1975), U.S. Army four-star general
- Edwin B. Wheeler (1918–1985), U.S. Marine Corps major general
- Hugh Wheeler (East India Company officer) (1789–1857), East India Company major general
- Joseph Wheeler (1836–1906), Confederate States Army and U.S. Army major general
- Norman Wheeler (1915–1990), British Army major general
- Peter Wheeler (politician) (1922–2015), Georgia National Guard brigadier general
- Raymond Albert Wheeler (1885–1974), U.S. Army lieutenant general
- Robert E. Wheeler (fl. 1980s–2020s), U.S. Air Force major general
- Roger Wheeler (British Army officer) (born 1941), British Army general
