= Callan Moody =

New Zealand long-distance runner

Personal information
- Born: 25 March 1988 (age 38)

Sport
- Country: New Zealand
- Sport: Long-distance running

Callan Moody (born 25 March 1988) is a New Zealand long-distance runner.

In April 2021, he ran his debut marathon in Cheshire, UK. He finished in 02:11:38 making him the 11th fastest New Zealander of all time over this distance.

He competed in the senior men's race at the 2019 IAAF World Cross Country Championships held in Aarhus, Denmark. He finished in 110th place.
