= Thomas Shigwedha =

Namibian long-distance runner

Personal information
- Born: 22 August 1995 (age 30)

Sport
- Country: Namibia
- Sport: Middle-distance running Long-distance running

Thomas Shigwedha (born 22 August 1995) is a Namibian long-distance runner.

In 2019, he competed in the senior men's race at the 2019 IAAF World Cross Country Championships held in Aarhus, Denmark. He finished in 113th place. He became the national 1500 meter champion in 2023.
