= Beatrice Chebet =

Kenyan track and field athlete (born 2000)

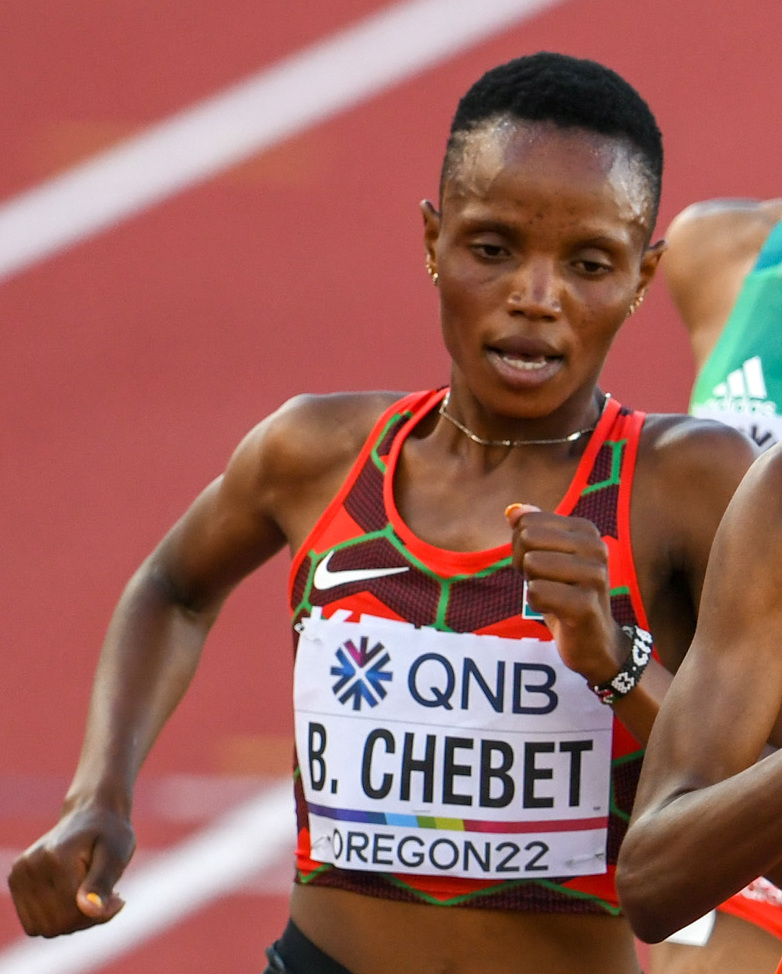
- Chebet at the 2022 World Championships in Eugene

Personal information
- Full name: Beatrice Chebet
- Born: 5 March 2000 (age 26) Kericho, Kenya
- Height: 1.52 m (5 ft 0 in)

Sport
- Country: Kenya
- Sport: Track and field
- Event: Long-distance running

Achievements and titles
- Highest world ranking: No. 1 (overall, 2024); No. 1 (5000 m, 2024); No. 1 (10,000 m, 2024); No. 1 (cross country, 2024)
- Personal bests: 1500 m: 3:54.73 (Chorzów 2025); 3000 m: 8:11.56 (Rabat 2025); Two miles: 9:14.71 (Eugene 2022); 5000 m: 13:58.06 WR (Eugene 2025); 10,000 m: 28:54.14 WR (Eugene 2024); Road; 5 km women-only: 14:13 Wo WR (Barcelona 2023); 5 km mixed: 13:54 Mx WR (Barcelona 2024)
Medal record
Women's athletics
Representing Kenya
Olympic Games
| Gold medal – first place | 2024 Paris | 5000 m |
| Gold medal – first place | 2024 Paris | 10,000 m |
World Championships
| Gold medal – first place | 2025 Tokyo | 5000 m |
| Gold medal – first place | 2025 Tokyo | 10,000 m |
| Silver medal – second place | 2022 Eugene | 5000 m |
| Bronze medal – third place | 2023 Budapest | 5000 m |
Diamond League
| First place | 2022 | 5000 m |
| First place | 2024 | 5000 m |
Commonwealth Games
| Gold medal – first place | 2022 Birmingham | 5000 m |
African Championships
| Gold medal – first place | 2022 Saint Pierre | 5000 m |
World Cross Country Championships
| Gold medal – first place | 2019 Aarhus | Junior race |
| Gold medal – first place | 2023 Bathurst | Senior race |
| Gold medal – first place | 2023 Bathurst | Senior team |
| Gold medal – first place | 2024 Belgrade | Senior race |
| Gold medal – first place | 2024 Belgrade | Senior team |
| Silver medal – second place | 2019 Aarhus | Junior team |
World Road Running Championships
| Gold medal – first place | 2023 Riga | 5K |
World Junior Championships
| Gold medal – first place | 2018 Tampere | 5000 m |
African Junior Championships
| Gold medal – first place | 2019 Abidjan | 5000 m |

Beatrice Chebet (born 5 March 2000) is a Kenyan long-distance runner and world record holder in the 5000 meters, 10,000 meters, and road 5k. She won gold medals in both the 5000 and 10,000 m at the 2024 Summer Olympics and repeated the double at the 2025 World Athletics Championships. In the 5000 m, Chebet won the silver medal at the 2022 World Championships, and the bronze in 2023. Chebet is a three-time World Cross Country champion, having won the junior race in 2019 and the senior race in 2023 and 2024. Additionally, Chebet was the 5000 m champion at the 2018 World U20 Championships, the 2022 Commonwealth Games, and the 2022 African Championships.

Chebet trains in Londiani, Kericho County.

== Early life and junior career ==
Chebet was born on 5 March 2000, the daughter of Francis and Lilian Kirui. While at primary school, she raced in 5000 m events, and went on to attend Saramek Secondary School, Londiani, graduating from there in 2013. She joined the Lemotit Athletics Club in November 2016.

In June 2018, at the age of 18, Chebet won the Kenyan Under-20s 5000 metres. A month later at Tampere 2018, she became the first Kenyan woman and the first non-Ethiopian since 2006 to win the 5000 m title at the World U20 Championships in Athletics.

At the 2019 World Cross Country Championships, the top three athletes in the women's U20 race – Chebet and the Ethiopian duo of Alemitu Tariku and Tsigie Gebreselama – were all awarded the time of 20:50 as they finished together. Tariku was initially announced as the winner, with Gebreselama awarded silver. However, after the photo finish footage was reviewed Chebet received the gold medal. During the same year, Chebet won the Kenyan U20 National Cross Country Championships.

== Senior career ==
=== 2022–2023 ===
At the 2022 World Championships in Eugene, Oregon, Chebet claimed a silver medal in the 5000 metres, with a time of 14:46.75 behind Gudaf Tsegay in 14:46.29 and ahead of Dawit Seyaum (14:47.36).

On 31 December 2023, at the Cursa dels Nassos in Barcelona, Chebet set a new women's only 5 kilometre world record of 14:13, which was faster than both the previous women's only world record of 14:29, and the mixed world record of 14:19 set in 2021.

=== 2024 ===
At the Prefontaine Classic on 25 May, Chebet broke Letesenbet Gidey's 10,000 metres world record of 29:01.03, running a time of 28:54.14 to become the first woman to break the 29 minute barrier. (Note: On the track; Agnes Ngetich set a road 10 km world record of 28:46 in January 2024.) The race was originally billed as a world record attempt by Gudaf Tsegay. Chebet attached herself to Gudaf throughout the twenty five lap race, but as Gudaf faded from world record pace nearing the end, Chebet surged with three laps to go to catch up with the world record wavelights and went on to break the record.

At the 2024 Summer Olympics, Chebet won an Olympic gold medal in the women's 5000 metres on 5 August, finishing with a time of 14:28.56, beating defending champion Sifan Hassan, reigning world champion Faith Kipyegon, and world record holder Gudaf Tsegay in a highly anticipated race. Chebet stayed in the pack for much of the race, but as Kipyegon made a surge to the front, Chebet followed, out-kicking Kipyegon in the final hundred metres to become the Olympic Champion. Chebet also won Olympic gold in the 10,000 metres on 9 August, finishing in a time of 30:43.25.

At the Weltklasse Zürich meeting on 5 September, Chebet attempted to break the 5000 metres world record of 14:00.21 set by Gudaf Tsegay in 2023, perhaps to become the first woman under the 14 minute barrier. However, with pacing only to 2000 metres and the weather conditions proving to be too poor for a record attempt, Chebet was unable to break the world record or her personal best of 14:05.92, but still managed to dip below 14:10 to win the race in a world leading time and a new meeting record of 14:09.52. On 14 September, Chebet won the 5000 metres at the Diamond League final in Brussels, Belgium, in a time of 14:09.82. On 31 December, at the Cursa dels Nassos, Chebet broke Agnes Jebet's mixed 5 kilometre world record of 14:13, running 13:54. In setting this record, Chebet became the first woman to break the 14 minute barrier on any surface.

=== 2025 ===
On 25 May, at the Meeting International Mohammed VI d'Athletisme de Rabat, Chebet ran the second fastest 3000 metres of all time, finishing in 8:11.56. This time falls 5.45 seconds short of Wang Junxia's officially recognized world record of 8:06.11 set in 1993. Given the controversy surrounding Junxia's world record, some organizations outside of World Athletics such as Track and Field News do not recognize it, which would make Chebet's performance the fastest in history. On 6 June, at the Golden Gala, Chebet ran the second fastest 5000 metres of all time, finishing in 14:03.69. On 5 July, at the Prefontaine Classic, with a 61-second final lap, Chebet broke Gudaf Tsegay's 5000 metre world record of 14:00.21, running 13:58.06 to become the first woman to break the 14 minute barrier on the track.

== Personal life ==
Chebet is expecting her first child in 2026.

== Achievements ==
=== International competitions ===
Representing Kenya
| Year | Competition | Venue | Position | Event | Result |
|---|---|---|---|---|---|
| 2017 | World U18 Championships | Nairobi, Kenya | 4th | 3000 m | 9:33.26 |
| 2018 | World U20 Championships | Tampere, Finland | 1st | 5000 m | 15:30.77 PB |
| 2019 | World Cross Country Championships | Aarhus, Denmark | 1st | Junior race | 20:50 |
| 2019 | World Cross Country Championships | Aarhus, Denmark | 2nd | Junior team | 26 pts |
| 2019 | African U20 Championships | Abidjan, Ivory Coast | 1st | 5000 m | 16:02.66 |
| 2022 | World Indoor Championships | Belgrade, Serbia | 10th | 3000 m | 8:47.50 |
| 2022 | African Championships | Saint Pierre, Mauritius | 1st | 5000 m | 15:00.82 |
| 2022 | World Championships | Eugene, United States | 2nd | 5000 m | 14:46.75 SB |
| 2022 | Commonwealth Games | Birmingham, United Kingdom | 1st | 5000 m | 14:38.21 SB |
| 2023 | World Cross Country Championships | Bathurst, Australia | 1st | Senior race | 33:48 |
| 2023 | World Cross Country Championships | Bathurst, Australia | 1st | Team | 16 pts |
| 2023 | World Championships | Budapest, Hungary | 3rd | 5000 m | 14:54.33 |
| 2024 | Olympic Games | Paris, France | 1st | 5000 m | 14:28.56 |
| 2024 | Olympic Games | Paris, France | 1st | 10,000 m | 30:43.25 |
| 2025 | World Championships | Tokyo, Japan | 1st | 5000 m | 14:54.36 |
| 2025 | World Championships | Tokyo, Japan | 1st | 10,000 m | 30:37.61 |

=== Circuit wins and titles, national titles ===
- Diamond League champion 5000 m: 2022
  - 2021: Doha Diamond League (3000 m WL PB)
  - 2022: Zürich Weltklasse (5 km PB)
  - 2024: Zürich Weltklasse
- World Athletics Cross Country Tour
  - 2022–23 (2): Atapuerca Cross Internacional, San Vittore Olona Cinque Mulini
- Kenyan Athletics Championships
  - 5000 metres: 2022

=== Personal bests ===
| Type | Event | Time (m:s) | Venue | Date |
|---|---|---|---|---|
| Track | 3000 metres | 8:11.56 AR | Rabat, Morocco | 25 May 2025 |
| Track | 3000 metres indoor | 8:37.06 | Madrid, Spain | 24 February 2021 |
| Track | Two miles | 9:14.71 | Eugene, United States | 27 May 2022 |
| Track | 5000 metres | 13:58.06 WR | Eugene, United States | 5 July 2025 |
| Track | 10,000 metres | 28:54.14 WR | Eugene, United States | 25 May 2024 |
| Road | 5 km women-only | 14:13 Wo WR | Barcelona, Spain | 31 December 2023 |
| Road | 5 km mixed | 13:54 Mx WR | Barcelona, Spain | 31 December 2024 |
| Road | 10 km | 32:52 | Eldoret, Kenya | 24 November 2019 |

=== Awards and honors ===
- In 2024, Chebet received the Golden Plate Award of the American Academy of Achievement alongside Faith Kipyegon, presented by President William Ruto at a ceremony in New York City.
