= Athletics at the 2024 Summer Olympics – Women's 10,000 metres =

Women's 10,000 metres at the Games of the XXXIII Olympiad
- Venue: Stade de France, Paris, France
- Date: 9 August 2024
- Competitors: 27
- Winning time: 30:43.25

Medalists
1st place, gold medalist(s)		Beatrice Chebet	Kenya
2nd place, silver medalist(s)		Nadia Battocletti	Italy
3rd place, bronze medalist(s)		Sifan Hassan	Netherlands

The women's 10,000 metres at the 2024 Summer Olympics was held at the Stade de France in Paris, France, on 9 August 2024. This was the tenth time that the women's 10,000 metres was contested at the Summer Olympics. A total of 27 athletes were able to qualify for the event by entry standard or ranking.

The winning margin was 0.10 seconds - the first time the women's 10,000 metres was won by less than half a second at the Olympics.

== Summary ==
The winner at the previous Olympics has been the center of the story in women's distance running since 2019, Sifan Hassan. Whether she wins or not, her finishing speed is something all the other competitors need to anticipate. She won the 2019 World Championships, was narrowly edged out to fourth in 2022 and fell down while leading just before the finish line in 2023. Letesenbet Gidey was victimized by her in 2019 getting silver, bronze in 2020, then Gidey won 2022. 2023 was an Ethiopian sweep, Gidey was second there to Gudaf Tsegay. Ejgayehu Taye was the third member of the sweep. The East African rivalry also includes Kenya, Hellen Obiri and Margaret Kipkemboi were silver and bronze in 2022. Beatrice Chebet set the world record earlier this year and already won the 5000 by out-sprinting Faith Kipyegon and Hassan. Tsegay and Lilian Kasait Rengeruk finished behind Chebet in that WR race, the fastest of the year. Gidey, Taye and Obiri did not run here.

With 25 laps to go, none of the contenders wanted to race early. Rino Goshima ended up on the front. They let her stay there for 10 laps. As is typical, Hassan went to the back of the pack. Next it was Daisy Jepkemei's turn to take the point, but only lasted for 2 laps until Lauren Ryan took over. Through this process, Chebet just off the front watching the proceedings. Nadia Battocletti was also nearby. With 10 laps to go, there was some pushing and shoving. Kipkemboi moved to the front. By this point, the pack was down to 13 with all three Kenyans, all three Ethiopians and all three Americans part of it. Tsigie Gebreselama took a lap on the front marked by all three Kenyans. At times the Kenyans tried forming what seemed like a Tour de France style protective wedge around Chebet, Rengeruk on the outside and Kipkemboi. Tsegay was marking Chebet a step behind. With 1500 to go, Parker Valby ran out of the American group who were towards the back of this pack, around the entire pack towards the front. They had seen Kenneth Rooks in the steeplechase and weren't going to have any of that. Kipkemboi sped up, the rest of the pack shuffled with the Ethiopians coming forward as a group on the outside, then everybody else jockeyed for position sometimes four abreast across the track shifting places all with Kipkemboi on the front, the pace quickening. Tsegay moved forward on outside, then Hassan moved up staying on outside. At the bell the three Kenyans were at the front, Chebet running wide, Battocletti sneaking up on the inside. Fotyen Tesfay and Tsegay separated Hassan from the Kenyans while the Americans and Gebreselama were dropping off the back. Through the final turn, Hassan got by the last two Ethiopians and Rengeruk. As they reached the home stretch and the time to race home Chebet finally moved in front of Kipkemboi. Battocletti was right behind Chebet with Hassan another step behind. By the time Hassan got past Kipkemboi, Chebet and Battocletti had some separation. Chebet had 2 metres on Battocletti and held it until easing up 10 metres before the finish line. Battocletti kept coming closing the gap to less than a meter but not enough to steal gold. After sprinting 500 metres, dealing with getting past so many bodies, Hassan couldn't make up the gap and had to settle for bronze.

== Background ==
The women's 10,000 m has been present on the Olympic athletics programme since 1988.

Global records before the 2024 Summer Olympics
Record	Athlete (nation)	Time (s)	Location	Date
World record	Beatrice Chebet (KEN)	28:54.14	Eugene, United States	25 May 2024
Olympic record	Almaz Ayana (ETH)	29:17.45	Rio de Janeiro, Brazil	12 August 2016
World leading	Beatrice Chebet (KEN)	28:54.14	Eugene, United States	25 May 2024

Area records before the 2024 Summer Olympics
Area record	Athlete (nation)	Time (s)
Africa (records)	Beatrice Chebet (KEN)	28:54.14 WR
Asia (records)	Wang Junxia (CHN)	29:31.78
Europe (records)	Sifan Hassan (NED)	29:06.82
North, Central America and Caribbean (records)	Alicia Monson (USA)	30:03.82
Oceania (records)	Kimberley Smith (AUS)	30:35.54
South America (records)	Florencia Borelli (ARG)	31:47.76

== Qualification ==
For the women's 10,000 metres event, the qualification period was between 1 July 2023 and 30 June 2024. 27 athletes were able to qualify for the event, with a maximum of three athletes per nation, by running the entry standard of 30:45.00 seconds or faster, or by their World Athletics Ranking for either this event or the Cross Country event.

== Results ==
=== Final ===
The final was held on 9 August, starting at 20:55 (UTC+2) in the evening.

Rank	Athlete	Nation	Time	Notes
1st place, gold medalist(s)	Beatrice Chebet	Kenya	30:43.25	
2nd place, silver medalist(s)	Nadia Battocletti	Italy	30:43.35	NR
3rd place, bronze medalist(s)	Sifan Hassan	Netherlands	30:44.12	SB
4	Margaret Kipkemboi	Kenya	30:44.58	
5	Lilian Kasait Rengeruk	Kenya	30:45.04	
6	Gudaf Tsegay	Ethiopia	30:45.21	
7	Fotyen Tesfay	Ethiopia	30:46.93	
8	Weini Kelati	United States	30:49.98	
9	Karissa Schweizer	United States	30:51.99	SB
10	Tsigie Gebreselama	Ethiopia	30:54.57	
11	Parker Valby	United States	30:59.28	
12	Sarah Chelangat	Uganda	31:02.37	
13	Lauren Ryan	Australia	31:13.25	
14	Francine Niyomukunzi	Burundi	31:17.02	PB
15	Eilish McColgan	Great Britain	31:20.51	SB
16	Diane van Es	Netherlands	31:25.51	
17	Daisy Jepkemei	Kazakhstan	31:26.55	
18	Rino Goshima	Japan	31:29.48	
19	Haruka Kokai	Japan	31:44.03	
20	Klara Lukan	Slovenia	31:45.15	
21	Annet Chemengich Chelangat	Uganda	31:50.41	PB
22	Yuka Takashima	Japan	31:52.07	SB
23	Megan Keith	Great Britain	33:19.92	
–	Rahel Daniel	Eritrea	DNF	
–	Alessia Zarbo	France	DNF	
