= Fotyen Tesfay =

Ethiopian long-distance runner (born 1998)

Personal information
- Nationality: Ethiopian
- Born: 17 February 1998 (age 28) Ofla, Tigray Region, Ethiopia
- Occupation: long-distance runner
- Years active: 2016–present

Sport
- Country: Ethiopia
- Sport: Athletics
- Events: Half marathon, 10 km, 10,000 metres, 5000 metres, 3000 metres, Cross country
- Club: Messebo club

Achievements and titles
- Olympic finals: 2024 Paris (10,000 m)
- Personal bests: Marathon: 2:10:53 (2026); Half marathon: 1:03:21 (2024); 10 km: 29:42 (2025); 10,000 metres: 29:47.71 (2024); 5000 metres: 14:50 (2025 - road)
Medal record
Athletics
Representing Ethiopia
Silver medal – second place	2023 World Athletics Cross Country Championships	Senior team

Fotyen Tesfay (born 17 February 1998) is an Ethiopian long-distance runner specializing in road racing and track events. She has achieved notable success in half marathons, setting records and competing at the highest level.

== Career ==
Fotyen Tesfay emerged on the international scene in 2016, placing 4th in the women's 3000 metres event at the 2016 IAAF World U20 Championships in Bydgoszcz, Poland. In the same year, she won the Great Ethiopian Run 10 km road race.

In 2017, she competed in the junior women's race at the 2017 IAAF World Cross Country Championships in Kampala, Uganda, finishing 6th. She also finished 11th in the senior women's race at the 2019 IAAF World Cross Country Championships held in Aarhus, Denmark. In 2020, she won the 63rd edition of the Campaccio cross country race in Italy.

Tesfay made a significant impact in 2024 and 2025. In April 2025, she shattered the course record at the Berlin Half Marathon with a time of 1:03:35, which was also the fifth-fastest women's half marathon time ever recorded globally at the time. She also competed in the women's 10,000 metres event at the 2024 Summer Olympics in Paris. In July 2023, Tesfay won the AJC Peachtree Road Race with a time of 30:43. In August 2023, she finished second at the TD Beach to Beacon 10K with a time of 31:38. In March 2026 she broke the course record for the Barcelona marathon with the second fastest women's time ever for a marathon at 2:10:53.

Her personal best in the half marathon is 1:03:21, set in October 2024 at the Valencia Half Marathon.

== Achievements ==
Year	Race	Place	Position	Time
2016	IAAF World U20 Championships (3000 m)	Bydgoszcz	4th	9:02.32
2016	Great Ethiopian Run (10 km)	Addis Ababa	1st	33:09
2017	IAAF World Cross Country Championships (Junior race)	Kampala	6th	20:00
2019	IAAF World Cross Country Championships (Senior race)	Aarhus	11th	37:05
2020	Campaccio cross country	San Giorgio su Legnano	1st	19:33
2023	World Cross Country Championships (Team)	Bathurst	3rd	
2023	AJC Peachtree Road Race	Atlanta	1st	30:43
2023	TD Beach to Beacon 10K	Cape Elizabeth	2nd	31:38
2024	Valencia Half Marathon	Valencia	3rd	1:03:21
2024	Summer Olympics (10,000 m)	Paris		
2025	Berlin Half Marathon	Berlin	1st	1:03:35 (CR)
2026	Barcelona Marathon	Barcelona	1st	2:10:51
