= 2019 IAAF World Cross Country Championships – Senior men's race =

Senior men's race at the 2019 IAAF World Cross Country Championships
- Organisers: IAAF
- Edition: 43rd
- Date: March 30
- Host city: Aarhus, Denmark
- Events: 1
- Distances: 10 km – Senior men (9.858 km)
- Participation: 144 athletes from 49 nations

The Senior men's race at the 2019 IAAF World Cross Country Championships was held at the Aarhus in Denmark, on March 30, 2019. Joshua Cheptegei from Uganda won the gold medal by four seconds from fellow countryman Jacob Kiplimo while Kenyan runner, Geoffrey Kamworor finished third.

== Race results ==
=== Senior men's race (10 km) ===
==== Individual ====
Rank	Athlete	Country	Time
1st place, gold medalist(s)	Joshua Cheptegei	Uganda	31:40
2nd place, silver medalist(s)	Jacob Kiplimo	Uganda	31:44
3rd place, bronze medalist(s)	Geoffrey Kamworor	Kenya	31:55
4	Aron Kifle	Eritrea	32:04
5	Selemon Barega	Ethiopia	32:16
6	Rhonex Kipruto	Kenya	32:17
7	Thomas Ayeko	Uganda	32:25
8	Andamlek Belihu	Ethiopia	32:29
9	Thiery Ndikumwenayo	Burundi	32:29
10	Joel Ayeko	Uganda	32:32
11	Rodrigue Kwizera	Burundi	32:37
12	Albert Chemutai	Uganda	32:46
13	Richard Yator	Kenya	32:51
14	Onesphore Nzikwinkunda	Burundi	32:56
15	Abdi Fufa	Ethiopia	33:01
16	Lesiba Mashele	South Africa	33:05
17	Robel Fsiha	Sweden	33:06
18	Mogos Tuemay	Ethiopia	33:06
19	Birhanu Balew	Bahrain	33:08
20	Ouassim Oumaiz	Spain	33:10
21	Rodgers Kwemoi	Kenya	33:11
22	Filmon Ande	Eritrea	33:12
23	Albert Rop	Bahrain	33:15
24	Dawit Fikadu	Bahrain	33:18
25	Enyew Mekonnen	Ethiopia	33:23
26	Aras Kaya	Turkey	33:25
27	Maxwell Rotich	Uganda	33:28
28	Awet Habte	Eritrea	33:32
29	Yemane Haileselassie	Eritrea	33:33
30	Brett Robinson	Australia	33:34
31	Mehari Tsegay	Eritrea	33:35
32	Joseph Tiophil Panga	Tanzania	33:37
33	Hassan Chani	Bahrain	33:38
34	Shadrack Kipchirchir	United States	33:46
35	Stanley Kipkoech Kebenei	United States	33:47
36	Napoleon Solomon	Sweden	33:49
37	Patrick Dever	Great Britain	33:49
38	Amos Kirui	Kenya	33:53
39	Matthew Ramsden	Australia	33:56
40	Bonsa Dida	Ethiopia	33:57
41	Fernando Carro	Spain	33:58
42	Rui Teixeira	Portugal	33:58
43	Noel Hitimana	Rwanda	33:59
44	Mahamed Mahamed	Great Britain	34:01
45	Evans Keitany Kiptum	Kenya	34:03
46	Matt Baxter	New Zealand	34:03
47	Theophile Bigirimana	Rwanda	34:08
48	Félicien Muhitira	Rwanda	34:11
49	Faraja Damas Lazaro	Tanzania	34:12
50	Emmanuel Roudolff-lévisse	France	34:12
51	Adam Hickey	Great Britain	34:12
52	Marco Monko	Tanzania	34:14
53	José Luis Rojas	Peru	34:15
54	Hamid Ben Daoud	Spain	34:17
55	Sesebo Matlapeng	Botswana	34:17
56	Harry Summers	Australia	34:23
57	Olivier Irabaruta	Burundi	34:25
58	Oliver Fox	Great Britain	34:27
59	Pakiso Mthembu	South Africa	34:27
60	Hillary Bor	United States	34:29
61	Francis Damiano Damasi	Tanzania	34:33
62	Sean Tobin	Ireland	34:33
63	Jack Rayner	Australia	34:33
64	Ross Millington	Great Britain	34:35
65	Yuta Bando	Japan	34:35
66	Ayad Lamdassem	Spain	34:42
67	Thabang Mosiako	South Africa	34:43
68	Abdi Hakin Ulad	Denmark	34:43
69	Emmanuel Bor	United States	34:43
70	Ryan Mphahlele	South Africa	34:50
71	Michael Gras	France	34:51
72	Tesfu Tewelde	Eritrea	34:52
73	Leonard Korir	United States	34:53
74	Yusuke Tamura	Japan	34:54
75	Rapula Diphoko	Botswana	34:57
76	Mason Ferlic	United States	34:59
77	Ben Preisner	Canada	35:01
78	Yuhi Nakaya	Japan	35:01
79	Juan Antonio Pérez	Spain	35:04
80	Kosei Yamaguchi	Japan	35:04
81	Ole Hesselbjerg	Denmark	35:04
82	Rory Linkletter	Canada	35:05
83	Federico Bruno	Argentina	35:07
84	Christophe Tuyishimire	Rwanda	35:08
85	Jamal Abdelmaji Eisa Mohammed	Athlete Refugee Team	35:09
86	Abdi Daud Roble	Somalia	35:11
87	Canisious Nyamutsita	Zimbabwe	35:12
88	Gabriel Gerald Geay	Tanzania	35:16
89	Omar Ramos	Peru	35:17
90	Zelalem Bacha	Bahrain	35:18
91	Yves Sikubwabo	Canada	35:21
92	Yohei Komatsu	Japan	35:24
93	Jacob Simonsen	Denmark	35:24
94	Peter Glans	Denmark	35:26
95	Jack Bruce	Australia	35:32
96	Johnatas De Oliveira	Brazil	35:34
97	Ehab El-Sandali	Canada	35:35
98	Peter Wheeler	New Zealand	35:38
99	Yusuke Nishiyama	Japan	35:42
100	Mohammed Moussaoui	France	35:53
101	Ahmed Moharram	Egypt	35:54
102	John Gay	Canada	35:58
103	Nicolás Cuestas	Uruguay	36:04
104	Mikkel Dahl-Jessen	Denmark	36:06
105	Kevin Dooney	Ireland	36:09
106	Glenison Gilbert De Carvalho	Brazil	36:10
107	Luke Traynor	Great Britain	36:13
108	Mike Tate	Canada	36:14
109	Emanuel Giniki Gisamoda	Tanzania	36:18
110	Callan Moody	New Zealand	36:23
111	Andre Ramos	Brazil	36:28
112	Edward Mwanza	Zambia	36:28
113	Thomas Shigwedha	Namibia	36:36
114	Juan Quijada	Chile	36:50
115	Jianqi Peng	China	36:52
116	Thijs Nijhuis	Denmark	36:53
117	Janis Viskers	Latvia	36:56
118	Adrian Garcea	Romania	37:03
119	Mohammad Dookun	Mauritius	37:29
120	Juan Huaman	Peru	37:48
121	Gaylord Silly	Seychelles	37:53
122	Kabelo Seboko	South Africa	38:14
123	Nader Jaber	Lebanon	38:14
124	Otmane Nait Hammou	Athlete Refugee Team	38:23
125	Amu Mao	China	38:41
126	Vasyl Koval	Ukraine	38:44
127	Zhoodar Kochkonbaev	Kyrgyzstan	38:52
128	Joshua Baan	New Zealand	38:56
129	Said Sulaymanov	Kazakhstan	38:58
130	Iven Moise	Seychelles	39:01
131	Andrew Grech	Malta	39:07
132	Oscar Antonio Aldana	El Salvador	39:23
133	Shaobo Cao	China	39:29
134	Imad Jizzini	Lebanon	39:29
135	Wan Chun Wong	Hong Kong	39:35
136	Yuxi Luo	China	39:52
137	Omar Bachir	Niger	40:05
138	Yadav Anil Kumar	India	40:53
139	Ali Wayzani	Lebanon	41:08
140	Tholego Keitshekile	Botswana	41:51
—	Nicolas Antonio Da Silva	Brazil	DNF
—	Mohamed Hrezi	Libya	DNS
—	Stewart Mcsweyn	Australia	DNS
—	Rantso Mokopane	South Africa	DNS

==== Teams ====
Rank	Team	Points
1st place, gold medalist(s)	Uganda	20
2nd place, silver medalist(s)	Kenya	43
3rd place, bronze medalist(s)	Ethiopia	46
4	Eritrea	83
5	Burundi	91
6	Bahrain	99
7	Spain	181
8	Australia	188
9	Great Britain	190
10	Tanzania	194
11	United States	198
12	South Africa	212
13	Rwanda	222
14	Japan	297
15	Denmark	336
16	Canada	347
17	New Zealand	382
18	China	509

== See also ==
- 2019 IAAF World Cross Country Championships – Junior men's race
- 2019 IAAF World Cross Country Championships – Senior women's race
- 2019 IAAF World Cross Country Championships – Junior women's race
- 2019 IAAF World Cross Country Championships – Mixed relay
