= Abdi Fufa =

Ethiopian long-distance runner

Personal information
- Born: 27 September 1995 (age 30)

Sport
- Country: Ethiopia
- Sport: Long-distance running

Abdi Fufa (born 27 September 1995) is an Ethiopian long-distance runner. He competed in the senior men's race at the 2019 IAAF World Cross Country Championships held in Aarhus, Denmark. He finished in 15th place.
