= Peter Wheeler (runner) =

New Zealand long-distance runner

Personal information
- Born: 3 April 1994 (age 31)

Sport
- Country: New Zealand
- Sport: Long-distance running

Peter Wheeler (born 3 April 1994) is a New Zealand long-distance runner.

In 2019, he competed in the senior men's race at the 2019 IAAF World Cross Country Championships held in Aarhus, Denmark. He finished in 98th place.
