= Winfred Mbithe =

Kenyan long-distance runner (born 1997)

Personal information
- Full name: Winfred Nzisa Mbithe
- Born: 30 May 1997 (age 29)

Sport
- Sport: Athletics
- Events: Middle-distance running, Long-distance running, Cross country running

Achievements and titles
- Personal bests: 1500m: 4:04.46 (2017); Mile: 4:32.02 (2018); 5000m: 15:42.00 (2024); Road; 5km: 15:31 (2024); 10km: 32:09 (2025)
Medal record
Women's athletics
Representing Kenya
World Cross Country Championships
Gold medal – first place	2017 Kampala	Mixed relay
Bronze medal – third place	2019 Aarhus	Mixed relay
Summer Youth Olympics
Silver medal – second place	2014 Nanjing	1500 m

Winfred Nzisa Mbithe (born 30 May 1997) is a Kenyan middle– and long-distance and cross country runner. She has represented Kenya in the mixed relay at the World Athletics Cross Country Championships.

== Career ==
Mbithe won the silver medal over 1500 metres at the 2014 Youth Olympic Games in Nanjing, China. She competed in the junior race at the 2015 IAAF World Cross Country Championships in Guiyang, China, although Kenya head coach David Letting told reporters that she received death threats over the phone prior to her race from unknown persons. At the 2016 IAAF World U20 Championships, she qualified for the final and placed fourth overall in the 1500 metres race.

She was a member of the Kenyan gold medal-winning mixed relay team at the 2017 IAAF World Cross Country Championships in Kampala, Uganda, winning by eight seconds ahead of Ethiopia in the inaugural running of the race, and ran the second leg of the relay alongside Asbel Kiprop, Beatrice Chepkoech, and Bernard Koros.

She was a bronze medalist at the 2019 IAAF World Cross Country Championships in Aarhus, in the mixed relay.

In February 2024, she was part of the Team Kenya mixed relay team who won the African Cross Country Championships held in Tunis, Tunisia.

In January 2026, she competed in the Kenyan mixed relay team at the 2026 World Athletics Cross Country Championships in Tallahassee, United States, helping the Kenyan team to a fourth-place finish overall.
