= Faraja Damas Lazaro =

Tanzanian long-distance runner

Personal information
- Born: 25 July 1997 (age 28)

Sport
- Country: Tanzania
- Sport: Long-distance running

Faraja Damas Lazaro (born 25 July 1997) is a Tanzanian long-distance runner.

In 2019, he competed in the senior men's race at the 2019 IAAF World Cross Country Championships held in Aarhus, Denmark. He finished in 49th place.
