= Teddese Lemi =

Ethiopian middle-distance runner

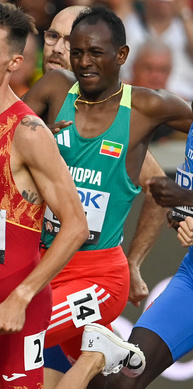
- Teddese Lemi in 2023

Personal information
- Full name: Teddese Lemi Urgesa
- Nationality: Ethiopian
- Born: 20 January 1999 (age 27)

Sport
- Sport: Athletics
- Event: 1500 metres

Achievements and titles
- Personal bests: 800 m: 1:44.65 (Chorzów 2021); 1500 m: 3:31.90 (Hengelo 2021)
Medal record
Representing Ethiopia
Men's cross country running
World Cross Country Championships
Gold medal – first place	2019 Aarhus	Mixed relay

Teddese Lemi Urgesa (born 20 January 1999) is an Ethiopian track and field athlete who specializes in middle-distance running. He competed at the 2019 IAAF World Cross Country Championships in Aarhus, where he won a gold medal in mixed relay with the Ethiopian team. He represented Ethiopia at the 2019 World Athletics Championships, competing in men's 1500 metres. He also competed in the 1500 metres at the 2020 Summer Olympics.
