= 2017 IAAF World Cross Country Championships – Mixed relay =

Mixed relay at the 2017 IAAF World Cross Country Championships
- Organisers: IAAF
- Edition: 42nd
- Date: March 26
- Host city: Kampala, Uganda
- Events: 1
- Distances: 7.858 km 2.023km + 2km + 2km + 1.835km
- Participation: 52 athletes from 13 nations

The Mixed relay race at the 2017 IAAF World Cross Country Championships was held at the Kampala in Uganda, on March 26, 2017. It was the first time this event was held at the World Cross Country Championships. 13 teams took part in the inaugural race. A team made by Refugee Athletes were set to compete, but they were unable to travel on time.

The exact length of the race was 7,858 m (2,023m first lap, two laps of 2,000 m and a final lap of 1,835m).

Complete results for individuals.

== Results ==
Rank	Nation	Athletes	Time
1st place, gold medalist(s)	Kenya	Asbel Kiprop, Winfred Nzisa Mbithe, Bernard Kipkorir Koros, Beatrice Chepkoech	22:22
2nd place, silver medalist(s)	Ethiopia	Welde Tufa, Bone Cheluke, Yomif Kejelcha, Genzebe Dibaba	22:30
3rd place, bronze medalist(s)	Turkey	Aras Kaya, Meryem Akdag, Ali Kaya, Yasemin Can	22:37
4	Bahrain	Sadik Mikhou, Dalila Abdulkadir, Benson Kiplagat Seurei, Tigist Gashaw	23:20
5	Morocco	Mohamed Tindouft, Oumaima Saoud, Sanae El Otmani, Brahim Kaazouzi	24:02
6	United States	Cory Leslie, Eleanor Fulton, Marisa Howard, Paul Kipkemoi Chelimo	24:08
7	Tanzania	Faraja Damas Lazaro, Sicilia Ginoka Panga, Jackline Sakilu, Marco Silvester Monko	24:13
8	Spain	Marc Alcalá, Solange Pereira, Jesús Ramos, Blanca Fernández	24:29
9	Eritrea	Netsanet Negasi, Berhane Tesfay, Helen Gebru, Awet Habte	24:47
10	Italy	Soufiane El Kabbouri, Margherita Magnani, Giulia Aprile, Joao Bussotti Neves	25:14
11	Sudan	Hossny Eisa, Sounia Faroog Hamdan, Amna Bakhit, Adam Fadl Alla Musa	25:53
12	South Sudan	Suzan Bumanga, Kamusu Muskan, Stella Ohiri, Majook Riak	29:30
	Uganda	Winnie Nanyondo, Geofrey Ruto, Dorcus Ajok, Ronald Musagala	DQ

== See also ==
- 2017 IAAF World Cross Country Championships – Junior women's race
- 2017 IAAF World Cross Country Championships – Senior men's race
- 2017 IAAF World Cross Country Championships – Senior women's race
- 2017 IAAF World Cross Country Championships – Junior men's race
