= Maxwell Rotich =

Ugandan long-distance runner

Personal information
- Born: 5 August 1998 (age 27)

Sport
- Country: Uganda
- Sport: Long-distance running

Maxwell Rotich (born 5 August 1998) is an Ugandan long-distance runner. In 2019, he competed in the senior men's race at the 2019 IAAF World Cross Country Championships held in Aarhus, Denmark. He finished in 27th place.
