= 2019 IAAF World Cross Country Championships – Junior men's race =

Junior men's race at the 2019 IAAF World Cross Country Championships
- Organisers: IAAF
- Edition: 43rd
- Date: March 30
- Host city: Aarhus, Denmark
- Events: 1
- Distances: 8 km – Junior men (7.886 km)
- Participation: 106 athletes from 49 nations

The Junior men's race at the 2019 IAAF World Cross Country Championships was held at the Aarhus in Denmark, on March 30, 2019. Milkesa Mengesha from Ethiopia won the gold medal by two seconds from fellow countryman Tadese Worku while Ugandan runner, Oscar Chelimo finished a second later in third.

== Race results ==
=== Junior men's race (8 km) ===
==== Individual ====
| Rank | Athlete | Country | Time |
|---|---|---|---|
| 1st place, gold medalist(s) | Milkesa Mengesha | Ethiopia | 23:52 |
| 2nd place, silver medalist(s) | Tadese Worku | Ethiopia | 23:54 |
| 3rd place, bronze medalist(s) | Oscar Chelimo | Uganda | 23:55 |
| 4 | Leonard Kipkemoi Bett | Kenya | 24:02 |
| 5 | Tsegay Kidanu | Ethiopia | 24:07 |
| 6 | Hosea Kiplangat | Uganda | 24:08 |
| 7 | Edwin Kiplangat Bett | Kenya | 24:18 |
| 8 | Samwel Chebolei Masai | Kenya | 24:19 |
| 9 | Samuel Kibet | Uganda | 24:29 |
| 10 | Gebregewergs Teklay | Ethiopia | 24:34 |
| 11 | Dinkalem Ayele | Ethiopia | 24:36 |
| 12 | Jakob Ingebrigtsen | Norway | 24:39 |
| 13 | Yohans Kifle | Eritrea | 25:06 |
| 14 | Mathew Job Chekwurui | Uganda | 25:07 |
| 15 | Charles Katul Lokir | Kenya | 25:09 |
| 16 | Filmon Kibrom | Eritrea | 25:16 |
| 17 | Robel Abebe | Eritrea | 25:20 |
| 18 | Cleophas Kandie Meyan | Kenya | 25:26 |
| 19 | Dan Chebet | Uganda | 25:49 |
| 20 | Issei Sato | Japan | 25:51 |
| 21 | Getnet Yetwale | Ethiopia | 25:53 |
| 22 | Denis Cherotich | Uganda | 25:55 |
| 23 | Houssam El Azzaouzi | Morocco | 25:56 |
| 24 | Mustapha Akkaoui | Morocco | 26:00 |
| 25 | Matthew Willis | Great Britain | 26:14 |
| 26 | Wei Yan | China | 26:16 |
| 27 | Robert De Villiers | South Africa | 26:16 |
| 28 | Maxime Chaumeton | South Africa | 26:18 |
| 29 | Shuaib Aljabaly | United States | 26:18 |
| 30 | Sam Clifford | Australia | 26:25 |
| 31 | Carter Cheeseman | United States | 26:25 |
| 32 | Ngconde Matwebu | South Africa | 26:27 |
| 33 | Jun Kasai | Japan | 26:29 |
| 34 | Anton Østdal | Denmark | 26:30 |
| 35 | Jose Luis Chaupin | Peru | 26:31 |
| 36 | Jackson Sharp | Australia | 26:33 |
| 37 | Rory James Leonard | Great Britain | 26:33 |
| 38 | Julio Palomino | Peru | 26:34 |
| 39 | Meikael Beaudoin Rousseau | United States | 26:35 |
| 40 | Baptiste Guyon | France | 26:35 |
| 41 | Evan Burke | Canada | 26:35 |
| 42 | Joel Ibler Lillesø | Denmark | 26:38 |
| 43 | Chekole Getenet | Australia | 26:40 |
| 44 | Pierre Bordeau | France | 26:40 |
| 45 | Taiga Nakanishi | Japan | 26:44 |
| 46 | Abdellah Latam | Morocco | 26:44 |
| 47 | Vicente Viciosa | Spain | 26:46 |
| 48 | Andrew Davies | Canada | 26:47 |
| 49 | Frank Lujan | Peru | 26:48 |
| 50 | Euan Brennan | Great Britain | 26:55 |
| 51 | Abderrafia Bouassel | Morocco | 26:56 |
| 52 | Romain Mainguy | France | 26:57 |
| 53 | Darragh McElhinney | Ireland | 27:00 |
| 54 | Etienne Daguinos | France | 27:01 |
| 55 | Charlie Perry | United States | 27:07 |
| 56 | Ryuto Igawa | Japan | 27:07 |
| 57 | Maximus Thiessen | Canada | 27:07 |
| 58 | Murdoch McIntyre | New Zealand | 27:08 |
| 59 | Mikołaj Czeronek | Poland | 27:08 |
| 60 | Arthur Gervais | France | 27:12 |
| 61 | Joshua Desouza | Canada | 27:12 |
| 62 | Joshua Cowperthwaite | Great Britain | 27:13 |
| 63 | Nicholas Seoposengwe | South Africa | 27:17 |
| 64 | Joshua Pholoana | South Africa | 27:18 |
| 65 | Zakariya Mahamed | Great Britain | 27:21 |
| 66 | Miguel Baidal | Spain | 27:21 |
| 67 | Othmane Lghrissi | Morocco | 27:22 |
| 68 | Jamie Battle | Ireland | 27:24 |
| 69 | Alejandro Quijada | Spain | 27:30 |
| 70 | Tetta Shiratori | Japan | 27:32 |
| 71 | Ebbe Møller | Denmark | 27:33 |
| 72 | Gabriel Mudel | United States | 27:40 |
| 73 | David Chipana | Peru | 27:41 |
| 74 | Tumi Lephoto | South Africa | 27:42 |
| 75 | Ibrahim Kedir | Canada | 27:44 |
| 76 | Stuart Hofmeyr | New Zealand | 27:45 |
| 77 | Markus Kirk Kjeldsen | Denmark | 27:51 |
| 78 | Oliver Raimond | Australia | 27:55 |
| 79 | Nicholas Mota | Canada | 27:55 |
| 80 | Biruk Rubio | Spain | 28:02 |
| 81 | Hicham Serroukh | Spain | 28:04 |
| 82 | Jaganatta Sánchez | Colombia | 28:08 |
| 83 | Taonga Mbambo | New Zealand | 28:11 |
| 84 | Toby Gualter | New Zealand | 28:12 |
| 85 | Thomas Campbell | Australia | 28:14 |
| 86 | Khalid Hussein | United States | 28:15 |
| 87 | Jeppe Risvig | Denmark | 28:38 |
| 88 | Tomasz Kurowski | Poland | 28:48 |
| 89 | Vasyl Sabunyak | Ukraine | 29:01 |
| 90 | Ilkham Yerkabayev | Kazakhstan | 29:12 |
| 91 | Michelo Siabwcha | Zambia | 29:14 |
| 92 | Tim Thull | Luxembourg | 29:47 |
| 93 | Chun Yin Tse | Hong Kong | 29:48 |
| 94 | Jad Shmysani | Lebanon | 30:19 |
| 95 | Almontaser Hamieh | Lebanon | 31:30 |
| 96 | Ameer El Abiad | Lebanon | 32:35 |
| 97 | Bassam Al Hayek | Lebanon | 32:39 |
| 98 | Mounir Saoud Hammad | Lebanon | 33:45 |
| - | Liam Gorman | Australia | DNF |
| - | Omar Ismail | Sweden | DNF |
| - | Alexander Tengblad Nikolaisen | Denmark | DNF |
| - | Benjamin West | Great Britain | DNF |
| - | Kibrom Afewwerki | Eritrea | DNS |
| - | Ibrahim Al Hassan | Ghana | DNS |
| - | Tiedros Amanuiel | Eritrea | DNS |
| - | Mebuki Suzuki | Japan | DNS |

== See also ==
- 2019 IAAF World Cross Country Championships – Senior men's race
- 2019 IAAF World Cross Country Championships – Senior women's race
- 2019 IAAF World Cross Country Championships – Junior women's race
- 2019 IAAF World Cross Country Championships – Mixed relay
