= Rhonex Kipruto =

Kenyan long-distance runner (born 1999)

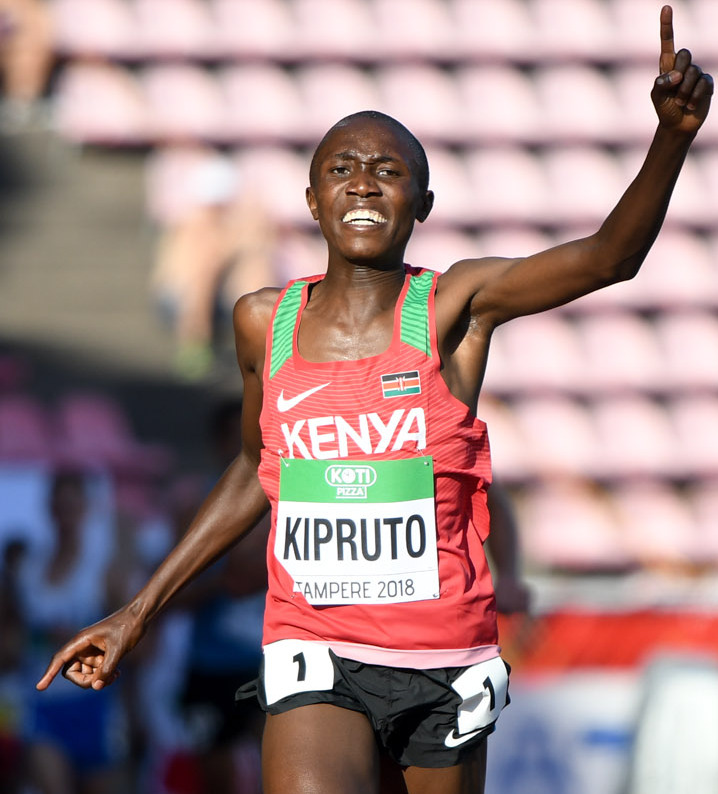
- Kipruto in 2018

Personal information
- Born: 12 October 1999 (age 26) Keiyo District, Kenya

Sport
- Country: Kenya
- Sport: Athletics
- Event: Long-distance running
- Coached by: Brother Colm O'Connell

Achievements and titles
- Personal bests: 5000 m: 13:07.40 (London 2019); 10,000 m: 26:50.16 (Stockholm 2019); Road; 10 km: 26:24 (Valencia 2020)
Medal record
Men's athletics
Representing Kenya
World Championships
Disqualified	2019 Doha	10,000 m
World U20 Championships
Gold medal – first place	2018 Tampere	10,000 m

Rhonex Kipruto (born 12 October 1999) is a Kenyan long-distance runner. Kipruto was the 2018 World Under-20 10,000 m champion.

Kipruto is currently serving a five-year ban set to expire in May 2028 for an anti-doping rule violation. His bronze medal in the 10,000 metres at the 2019 World Athletics Championships and being the world record holder for the 10 km road race were disqualified in June 2024 due to “a deliberate and sophisticated doping regime”. Prior to his result being annulled, Kipruto placed third on the half marathon world all-time list.

== Career ==
Rhonex Kipruto was born in Kombatich Sub-Location. He studied at Kombatich Primary School before attending to Kimwogo Mixed Day School. It is at this point of his life where he started to showcase his athletics talent and was noticed by his primary school athletics coach Mr.Julius Kimaiyo.

He was brought up from an ample background where his parents were farmers. He grew up in Kombatich and his coach is Colm O'Connell.

=== 2017 ===
In September, 17-year-old Kipruto finished third in the 10 kilometres road race at the Prague Grand Prix with a time of 27:13. It was the first time in history that three men finished inside 27:20 in the same 10 km race.

=== 2018 ===
On 10 February, he placed second in the junior men's run at the Kenyan Cross Country Championships. The following month on 17 March, he participated in the African Cross Country Championships U20 race in Algeria. He won the 8 km run with a time of 25:01. Kipruto then won the UAE Healthy Kidney 10 km in New York City, U.S. on 29 April. While Leonard Komon's (former 10K world record holder) 2011 course record was 27:35 Kipruto finished in 27:08, the fastest 10K on a record-eligible course on US soil.

He went to the World U20 Championships held in Tampere, Finland in July. On 10 July, he won the 10,000 metres title with a time of 27:21.08, a new championship record. Jacob Kiplimo of Uganda (the 2017 U20 cross country world champion) placed second 22 seconds behind and Berihu Aregawi of Ethiopia came in third with 27:48.41.

On 8 September, Kipruto ran in his third 10K race the second-fastest time in history (behind the Leonard Komon's world record of 26:44 from 2010) with his winning time of 26:46 in Prague.

=== 2019 ===
Kipruto won the IAAF Cross Country Permit in Elgoibar on 13 January in a time of 32:05. In February, he placed sixth in the men's senior 10 km race at the Kenyan Cross Country Championships in Eldoret, finishing 18 seconds behind Amos Kirui's winning time of 29:51. Kipruto then ran in the men's senior race at the World Cross Country Championships held in March in Aarhus, Denmark. He finished sixth in a time of 32:17 out of 144 starters. The run was won by Joshua Cheptegei (Uganda) in 31:40 and Jacob Kiplimo placed second in 31:44. However, Kipruto won with Kenya the silver medal in the team ranking behind Uganda and ahead of Ethiopia.

On 4 July, Kipruto won the 10 km Peachtree Road Race in Atlanta, Georgia, USA with a time of 27:01, breaking the previous course record and setting an all-comers' record (best performance on country's soil). The Association of Road Racing Statisticians describes this race as "Acceptable for ranking, no record quality...". The former course record was set in 1996 with a time of 27:04 by Joseph Kimani. Kipruto's brother Bravin Kiptoo placed second with a time of 27:29, and Kennedy Kimutai finished in third place with 27:54. At the Kenyan Championships on 21 August, Kipruto placed second in the 10,000 m in a time of 27:26.34. The race was won by Geoffrey Kamworor in a time of 27:24.76.

2019 IAAF World Championships in Doha, Qatar

On 6 October 2019, Kipruto raced the 10,000 m. The winner was Joshua Cheptegei (Uganda) in 26:48.36, the runner up was Yomif Kejelcha (Ethiopia) in 26:49.34. Kipruto took the bronze medal with a time of 26:50.32.

=== 2020–present ===
On 12 January 2020, Kipruto set a 10 km road race world record in Valencia with a time of 26:24. The former world record had been set by Joshua Cheptegei in Valencia on 1 December 2019 with 26:38. Benard Kimeli (Kenya) came in second with 27:12 and Julien Wanders of Switzerland finished in third place in 27:13, a new European record. Kipruto covered the first half in 13:18 and the second one in 13:06. Wanders improved on his own European record by 12 seconds.

At the postponed 2020 Tokyo Olympics in July 2021, he finished ninth in the 10,000 m final with a time of 27:52.78.

In March 2022, Kipruto won the New York City Half Marathon in a time of 1:00:30.

In May 2023, Kipruto was provisionally suspended by the Athletics Integrity Unit for the use of a prohibited substance/method from his athlete biological passport (ABP) data. In June 2024, Kipruto was banned for six years backdated to May 2023 for a "a deliberate and sophisticated doping regime". His race results from September 2018 to May 2023 were disqualified. His ban has later reduced to five years on appeal.

== Achievements ==
=== International competitions ===
Representing Kenya
Year	Competition	Venue	Position	Event	Result
2018	World U20 Championships	Tampere, Finland	1st	10,000 m	27:21.08 CR
2019	World Cross Country Championships	Aarhus, Denmark	DQ	Senior race	~~32:17~~
2019	World Cross Country Championships	Aarhus, Denmark	DQ	Senior team	~~43 pts~~
2019	World Championships	Doha, Qatar	DQ	10,000 m	~~26:50.32~~
2021	Olympic Games	Tokyo, Japan	DQ	10,000 m	~~27:52.78~~

=== Personal bests ===
Surface	Distance	Time (m:s)	Location	Date	Notes
Track	3000 metres	7:48.08	Cambridge, MA, USA	19 May 2018	
Track	5000 metres	13:07.40	London, United Kingdom	20 July 2019	
Track	10,000 metres	26:50.16	Stockholm, Sweden	30 May 2019	
Road	5 kilometres	13:18	Valencia, Spain	12 January 2020	
Road	10 kilometres	26:24	Valencia, Spain	12 January 2020	World record
Road	Half marathon	57:49	Valencia, Spain	6 December 2020	3rd athlete all time

Information taken from World Athletics profile.
