= Jan Meda =

Large field in Addis Ababa, Ethiopia

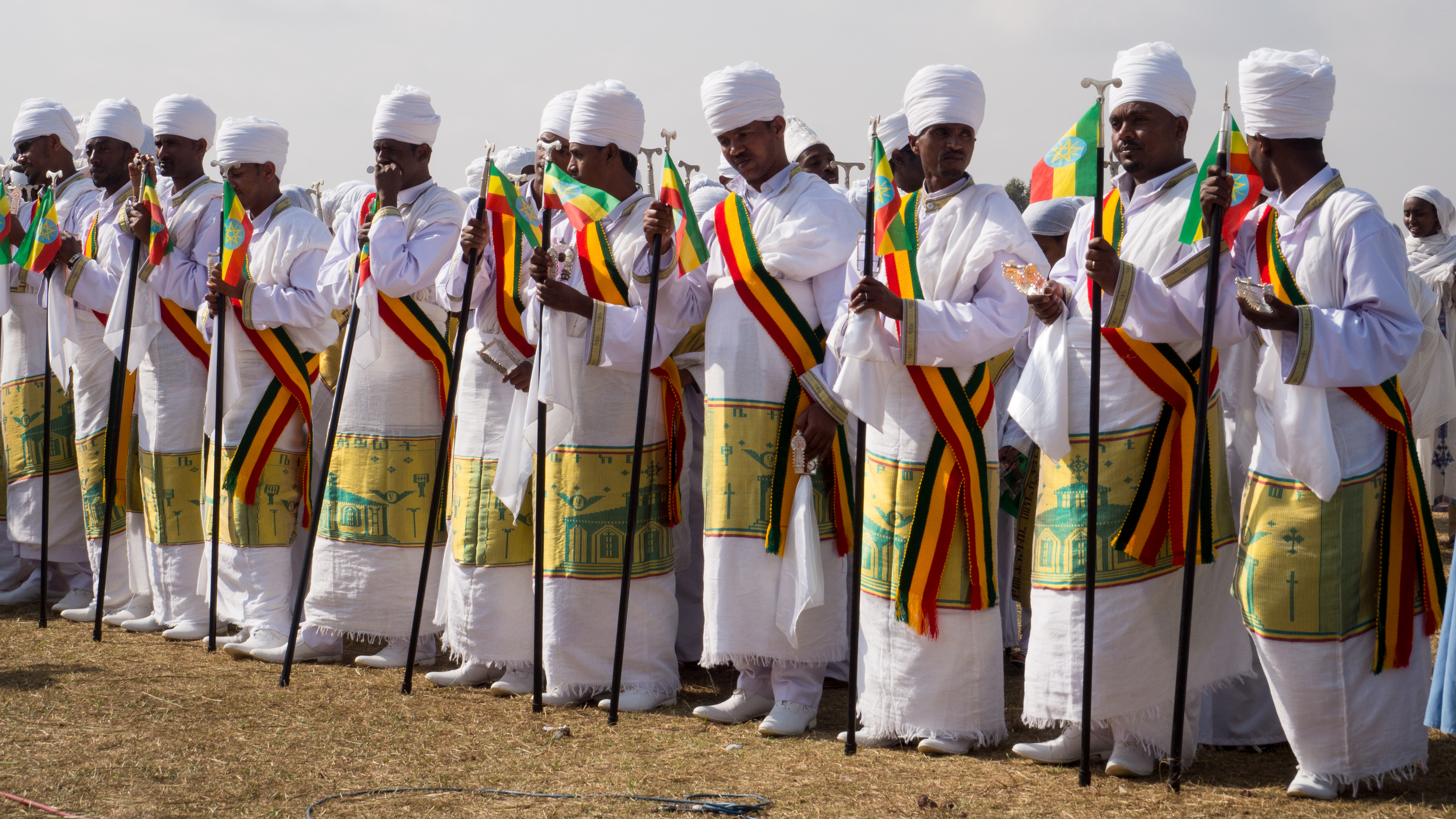
- Ethiopian Orthodox Church priests celebrating Timkat at Jan Meda in 2015
- Interactive map of Jan Meda
- Full name: Jan Meda Sport Ground
- Location: Addis Ababa, Ethiopia
- Coordinates: 9.042882796108058°N 38.76887336622927°E
- Type: Sporting; Social; Religious celebration (e.g Timkat celebration)

Jan Meda Sport Ground or Jan Meda, is a large field in Addis Ababa, Ethiopia. With an area of 2.5 hectares, the sport ground hosts Jan Meda International Cross Country as well as social and religious events, most notability, the Timkat celebration held there.

Commissioned by Emperor Menelik II to commemorate Ethiopian victory during 1896 Battle of Adwa, the ground is dedicated to St. George. Menelik, his royal family and entourages used the field for horse racing and polo. Jan Meda is a compound word of Jan (Janhoy, meaning "His Majesty King") and Meda ("field"). Thus, it is called "King's field". Jan Meda is a large open space located in north-eastern of Addis Ababa.

During the 60s and 70s, ye-gena qwas or dula tournaments (along with polo) were played among military divisions in the presence of higher officials whose teams included the "Mechal Club" (4th division "Toreserawit"), Mekuria Club ( 1st division, Kiber Zebenya), Omedla Club (police department / Airforce), Finance Club, and more at Janhoy Meda on the day of Christmas.
