= 2017 World Youth Championships in Athletics – Girls' 3000 metres =

The Girls' 3000 metres at the 2017 World Youth Championships in Athletics was held on 12 July.

== Medalists ==
Gold	Silver	Bronze

== Records ==
Prior to the competition, the following records were as follows.

World Youth Best	Ma Ningning (CHN)	8:36.45	Jinan, China	6 June 1993
Championship Record	Mercy Cherono (KEN)	8:53.94	Ostrava, Czech Republic	11 July 2007
World Youth Leading	Martha Mokaya (KEN)	9:01.52	Fukuoka, Japan	18 June 2017

== Final ==
Rank	Name	Nationality	Time	Notes
	Micheline Niyomahoro	Burundi		
	Sophie Søefeldt	Denmark		
	Beatrice Chebet	Kenya		
	Dipuo Mashishi	South Africa		
	Yitayish Mekonene	Ethiopia		
	Claire Carrere	France		
	Téna Tchammou	Benin		
	Sarah Chelangat	Uganda		
	Abersh Minsewo	Ethiopia		
	Emmaculate Chepkirui	Kenya		
	Esther Yeko Chekwemoi	Uganda		
	Berenice Fulchiron	France		
	Souhaila Bahtar	Morocco		
	Mercy Malembo	Malawi		
