= Kaoutar Farkoussi =

Moroccan runner (born 1996)

Kaoutar Farkoussi (born 19 March 1996) is a Moroccan runner.

On the track, she won the silver medal in the 5000 metres at the 2017 Jeux de la Francophonie, finished sixth at the 2017 Islamic Solidarity Games, and won the gold medal at the 2018 Mediterranean Games.

Outside the track, she won a silver medal in mixed relay at the 2019 World Cross Country Championships.

Her personal best 5000 metres time is 15:48.73 minutes, achieved in July 2018 in Rabat.
