= Milkesa Mengesha =

Ethiopian athlete

- Mengesha at the 2023 World Athletics Championships

Personal information
- Full name: Tolosa Milkesa Mengesha
- Born: 16 April 2000 (age 26)

Sport
- Sport: Track and Field
- Events: 3000 metres; 5000 metres; 10000 metres
Medal record
World Marathon Majors
Gold medal – first place	2024 Berlin	Marathon
Bronze medal – third place	2026 Chicago	Marathon

Tolosa Milkesa Mengesha (born 16 April 2000) is an Ethiopian track and field athlete.

== Career ==
Mengesha won gold in the 2019 IAAF World Cross Country Championships – Junior men's race in Aarhus.

In June 21 he shaved 27 seconds off his personal best in the 5000m going from 13:25.74 to 12:58.28 as he finished third in the Ethiopian Olympic trials behind Nibret Melak and Getnet Wale, ahead of the delayed 2020 Tokyo Olympics.

In September 2024, he won the Berlin Marathon with a personal record time of 2:03:17. In November 2025, he won the Shanghai Marathon in 2:06:25.

== Personal bests ==
Outdoor

- 3000 metres – 7:49.23 (Oslo 2019)
- 5000 metres – 12:58.28 (Hengelo 2021)
- 10000 metres – 27:00.24 (Hengelo 2022)

Road

- 10 kilometres – 27:47 (Dongio 2019)
- Half marathon – 58:58 (København 2022)
- Marathon - 2:03:17 (Berlin, 2024)
