= Mogos Tuemay =

Ethiopian long-distance runner

Personal information
- Born: 24 May 1997 (age 29)

Sport
- Country: Ethiopia
- Sport: Long-distance running

Achievements and titles
- Personal bests: Outdoor; 3000 m: 8:03.83 (Donetsk 2013); 5000 m: 13:15.04 (Shanghai 2019); 10,000 m: 27:23.49 (Hengelo 2019); 10K: 27:50 (Herzogenaurach 2021); Half marathon: 1:00:11 (Naples 2022)
Medal record
Men's athletics
Representing Ethiopia
African Championships
| Gold medal – first place | 2022 Port Louis | 10,000 metres |
World Cross Country Championships
| Silver medal – second place | 2023 Bathurst | Senior team |

Mogos Tuemay Abraha (born 24 May 1997) is an Ethiopian long-distance runner. He competed in the senior men's race at the 2019 IAAF World Cross Country Championships held in Aarhus, Denmark. He finished in 18th place. In the same year, he also competed in the men's 5000 metres event at the 2019 Diamond League Shanghai where he finished in 13th place with a new personal best of 13:15.04.

He competed at the African Cross Country Championships in 2016 and in 2018.

In 2020, he won the 63rd edition of the Campaccio held in San Giorgio su Legnano, Italy.
