= Enyew Mekonnen =

Ethiopian long-distance runner

Personal information
- Born: 7 April 1994 (age 31)

Sport
- Country: Ethiopia
- Sport: Long-distance running

Enyew Mekonnen (born 7 April 1994) is an Ethiopian long-distance runner. In 2019, he competed in the senior men's race at the 2019 IAAF World Cross Country Championships held in Aarhus, Denmark. He finished in 25th place.
