= Alemitu Tariku =

Ethiopian sprinter

Personal information
- Nationality: Ethiopian
- Born: Alemitu Tariku Olana; 28 September 2000 (age 25)

Sport
- Country: Ethiopia
- Sport: Athletics
- Events: 3000m, 5000m

Alemitu Tariku (born 28 September 2000) is an Ethiopian sprinter.

== Career ==
Alemitu Tariku gained her first international experience at the 2019 World Cross Country Championships in Aarhus, where she won the silver medal in the U20 classification in 20:50 minutes behind Kenyan Beatrice Chebet and won the gold medal with the Ethiopian team. She then won the 3000 meter dash at the Junior African Championships in Abidjan in 9:33.53 min. In August she won the bronze medal over 5000 meters in 15:37.15 min at the African Games in Rabat behind Kenyan Lilian Kasait Rengeruk and her compatriot Hawi Feysa.

== Honor and achievements ==
Year	Competition	Position	Event	Time	Wind (m/s)	Venue	Notes
2019	World Cross Country Championships	2nd	Under 20 Race	20:50		Aarhus, Denmark	
2019	All African Games	3rd	5000 Metres Race	15:37:15		Complexe Sportif Prince Moulay Abdellah, Rabat Morocco	
2019	African U20 Championships	1st	3000 Metres Race	9:33:53		Abidjan Côte d'Ivoire	
