= Dinkalem Ayele =

Ethiopian long-distance runner

Personal information
- Nationality: Ethiopian
- Born: December 19, 2000 (age 24)

Sport
- Sport: Athletics
- Event(s): Long-distance running (3000m, Half Marathon, Marathon)

Dinkalem Ayele (born 19 December 2000) is an Ethiopian long-distance runner who competes in both track and road races, including the 3000 metres, half marathon, and marathon. He is known for consistent sub-60-minute half marathon performances and notable international victories.

== Career ==
In 2019, Ayele was part of the gold medal-winning junior team at the World Athletics Cross Country Championships.

On the track, he achieved a personal best in the 3000 metres in 2021, clocking 7:39.90.

In August 2022, Ayele finished second at the Buenos Aires Half Marathon in 1:00:29.

2024 was a successful year for Ayele in half marathon racing. In February, he set a new personal best of 59:30 at the Barcelona Half Marathon, securing a fourth-place finish in a highly competitive field. The following month, in March, he claimed victory at the prestigious Lisbon Half Marathon, completing the race in 1:00:36 despite challenging warm conditions.

In April 2024, Ayele secured another strong performance, placing second at the Türkiye İş Bankası Istanbul Half Marathon, finishing in 59:55. He concluded his 2024 half marathon season with a seventh-place finish at the Copenhagen Half Marathon in October, clocking 1:00:11.

In January 2025, Ayele made his marathon debut, achieving a personal best of 2:07:53.

== Personal bests ==
As of May 2025, Ayele's personal bests are:

- 3000 metres – 7:39.90 (2021)
- Half Marathon – 59:30 (Barcelona, 2024)
- Marathon – 2:07:53 (2025)
