= Peter Wheeler (politician) =

American politician

Pete Wheeler (October 19, 1922 in Albany, Georgia – April 21, 2015 in Atlanta, Georgia) was the commissioner of the Georgia Department of Veterans Service from 1954 until his death in 2015, making him the longest serving state commissioner in the history of the United States. Commissioner Wheeler also rose to the rank of Brigadier General in the Georgia National Guard.

He was a graduate of the University of Georgia and served in the United States Army during World War II.
