= Tsigie Gebreselama =

Ethiopian long-distance runner

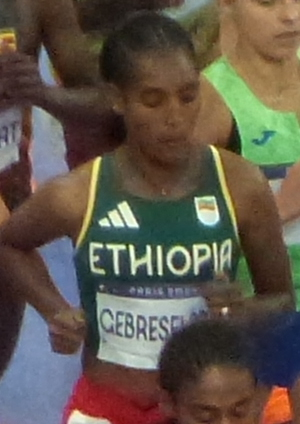
- Tsigie in the 10,000 m at the 2024 Olympics

Personal information
- Nationality: Ethiopian
- Born: September 30, 2000 (age 26) Saesi Tsaedaemba, Tigray Region, Ethiopia

Sport
- Country: Ethiopia
- Sport: Athletics
- Event: Long-distance running

Achievements and titles
- Personal bests: 3000m: 8:24.40 (Lausanne, 2024); 5000m: 14:18.76 (Eugene, 2024); 10,000m: 29:48.34 (San Juan Capistrano, 2024); Road 10 Kilometres: 30:29 (Paderborn, 2023); Half marathon: 1:05.14 (Ras Al Khaimah, 2024)
Medal record
Women's athletics
Representing Ethiopia
World Junior Championships
Bronze medal – third place	2018 Tampere	3000 m
World Cross Country Championships
Gold medal – first place	2019 Aarhus	Junior team
Silver medal – second place	2023 Bathurst	Senior race
Silver medal – second place	2023 Bathurst	Senior team
Bronze medal – third place	2019 Aarhus	Junior race

Tsigie Gebreselama (born 30 September 2000) is an Ethiopian long-distance runner. She won the silver medal in the women's race at the 2023 World Cross Country Championships and bronze for the junior women's race at the 2019 World Cross Country Championships. In 2019, she also won the 15 km road race at the Istanbul Marathon.

== Career ==
At the 2018 World Under-20 Championships, 17-year-old Tsigie Gebreselama won the bronze medal in the women's 3000 metres event.

In 2019, she won the bronze medal in the junior women's race at the World Cross Country Championships with a time of 20:50. In the same year, she also won the 15 km Montferland Run held in 's-Heerenberg, Netherlands, setting a new course record of 47:29.

The 20-year-old competed in the women's 10,000 metres event at the postponed 2020 Tokyo Olympics in 2021.

She won the silver medal for the women's race at the 2023 World Cross Country Championships held in Bathurst, Australia.

In 2024, She won the 5000 metres at the Prefontaine Classic in Eugene clocking a time of 14:18.76 moving her up to 14th on the all-time top list She competed in the women's 10,000 metres event at the 2024 Summer Olympics held in Paris, France.

== Achievements ==
=== Circuit performances ===
Grand Slam Track results
Slam	Race group	Event	Pl.	Time	Prize money
2025 Kingston Slam	Long distance	3000 m	3rd	8:38.15	US$30,000
2025 Kingston Slam	Long distance	5000 m	3rd	15:24.62	US$30,000
2025 Miami Slam	Long distance	5000 m	6th	15:03.21	US$20,000
2025 Miami Slam	Long distance	3000 m	4th	8:24.47	US$20,000
2025 Philadelphia Slam	Long distance	3000 m	8th	8:57.64	US$5,000

=== International competitions ===
Representing Ethiopia
Year	Competition	Venue	Position	Event	Result
2018	World U20 Championships	Tampere, Finland	3rd	3000 m	8:59.20
2019	World Cross Country Championships	Aarhus, Denmark	3rd	Junior race	20:50
2019	World Cross Country Championships	Aarhus, Denmark	1st	Junior team	17 pts
2021	Olympic Games	Tokyo, Japan		10,000 m	DNF
2023	World Cross Country Championships	Bathurst, Australia	2nd	Senior race	33:56
2023	World Cross Country Championships	Bathurst, Australia	2nd	Team	25 pts
2025	World Championships	Tokyo, Japan	21st	10,000 m	32:33.73
Road races
2018	Great Ethiopian Run	Addis Ababa, Ethiopia	3rd	10 km	33:53
2019	Istanbul Marathon	Istanbul, Turkey	1st	15 km	49:42
2019	Great Ethiopian Run	Addis Ababa, Ethiopia	2nd	10 km	32:21
2019	Montferland Run	's-Heerenberg, Netherlands	1st	15 km	47:29
2020	Women's First 5 km	Addis Ababa, Ethiopia	1st	5 km	15:20
2021	Great Ethiopian Run	Addis Ababa, Ethiopia	1st	10 km	32:33
2022	Corrida de Langueux	Langueux, France	2nd	10 km	30:53
2022	Copenhagen Half Marathon	Copenhagen, Denmark	2nd	Half marathon	1:06:35
2022	Valencia Half Marathon	Valencia, Spain	2nd	Half marathon	1:05:46
2022	Jeddah Half Marathon	Jeddah, Saudi Arabia	4th	Half marathon	1:08:59
2026	Boilermaker Road Race	Utica, NY	1st	15 km	47:29

=== National titles ===
- Ethiopian Athletics Championships
  - 10,000 metres: 2021
