= 2019 IAAF World Cross Country Championships =

43rd World Cross Country Championships
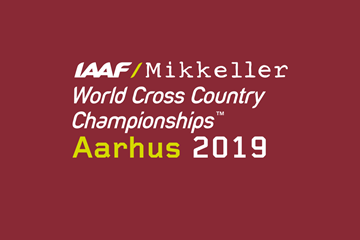
- Organisers: IAAF
- Edition: 43rd
- Date: 30 March
- Host city: Aarhus, Denmark
- Venue: Aarhus
- Events: 5
- Distances: 10,240 m (senior men and women); 8,240 m (mixed relay); 7,728 m (junior men); 5,856 m (junior women)
- Participation: 520 athletes from 63 nations
- Official website: Aarhus 2019

The 2019 IAAF World Cross Country Championships were hosted in the city of Aarhus in Denmark. It was the 43rd edition of the championships and was held on 30 March 2019.

A part of the course was run on the grounds and grass roof of the Moesgaard Museum. The race was held in challenging conditions, due to the very muddy course and steep hills. The senior men's race was won by Ugandan Joshua Cheptegei, while the senior women's race was won by Kenyan Hellen Obiri.

== Schedule ==
In keeping with past events, all five races, including the mixed relay, were held in the middle of the day. The junior races preceded the senior races, and the senior men's event concluded the program.

Date	Time (CET)	Events
30 March	11:00	Mixed Relay
30 March	11:35	Junior race women
30 March	12:10	Junior race men
30 March	13:00	Senior race women
30 March	14:00	Senior race men

== Medalists ==
Event	Gold		Silver		Bronze	
Individual
Senior men (10 km)	Joshua Cheptegei (UGA)	31:40	Jacob Kiplimo (UGA)	31:44	Geoffrey Kamworor (KEN)	31:55
Senior women (10 km)	Hellen Obiri (KEN)	36:14	Dera Dida (ETH)	36:16	Letesenbet Gidey (ETH)	36:24
Junior men (8 km)	Milkesa Mengesha (ETH)	23:52	Tadese Worku (ETH)	23:54	Oscar Chelimo (UGA)	23:55
Junior women (6 km)	Beatrice Chebet (KEN)	20:50	Alemitu Tariku (ETH)	20:50	Tsigie Gebreselama (ETH)	20:50
Relay
Mixed Relay	Ethiopia: Kebede Endale; Bone Cheluke; Teddese Lemi; Fantu Worku	25:49	Morocco: Soufiane El Bakkali; Kaoutar Farkoussi; Abdelaati Iguider; Rababe Arafi	26:22	Kenya: Conseslus Kipruto; Jarinter Mawia Mwasya; Elijah Motonei Manangoi; Winfred Nzisa Mbithe	26:29
Team
Senior men	Uganda: Joshua Cheptegei (1); Jacob Kiplimo (2); Thomas Ayeko (7); Joel Ayeko (10); Albert Chemutai ~~(12)~~; Maxwell Rotich ~~(27)~~	20	Kenya: Geoffrey Kamworor (3); Rhonex Kipruto (6); Richard Yator (13); Rodgers Kwemoi (21); Amos Kirui ~~(38)~~; Evans Keitany Kiptum ~~(45)~~	43	Ethiopia: Selemon Barega (5); Andamlak Belihu (8); Abdi Fufa (15); Mogos Tuemay (18); Enyew Mekonnen ~~(25)~~; Bonsa Dida ~~(40)~~	46
Senior women	Ethiopia: Dera Dida (2); Letesenbet Gidey (3); Tsehay Gemechu (6); Zenebu Fikadu (10); Fotyen Tesfay ~~(11)~~; Hawi Feysa ~~(17)~~	21	Kenya: Hellen Obiri (1); Beatrice Chepkoech (7); Eva Cherono (8); Deborah Samum (9); Lilian Kasait Rengeruk ~~(12)~~; Beatrice Chepkemoi Mutai ~~(31)~~	25	Uganda: Rachael Zena Chebet (4); Peruth Chemutai (5); Juliet Chekwel (13); Esther Chebet (14); Stella Chesang ~~(21)~~; Doreen Chesang ~~(63)~~	36
Junior men	Ethiopia: Milkesa Mengesha (1); Tadese Worku (2); Tsegay Kidanu (5); Gebregewergs Teklay (10); Dinkalem Ayele ~~(11)~~; Getnet Yetwale ~~(21)~~	18	Uganda: Oscar Chelimo (3); Hosea Kiplangat (6); Samuel Kibet (9); Mathew Job Chekwurui (14); Dan Chebet ~~(19)~~; Denis Cherotich ~~(22)~~	32	Kenya: Leonard Kipkemoi Bett (4); Edwin Kiplangat Bett (7); Samwel Chebolei Masai (8); Charles Katul Lokir (15); Cleophas Kandie Meyan ~~(18)~~	34
Junior women	Ethiopia: Alemitu Tariku (2); Tsigie Gebreselama (3); Girmawit Gebrzihair (5); Mizan Alem (7); Wede Kefale ~~(8)~~; Meselu Berhe ~~(11)~~	17	Kenya: Beatrice Chebet (1); Betty Chepkemoi Kibet (6); Jackline Chepwogen Rotich (9); Lydia Jeruto Lagat (10); Mercy Chepkorir Kirarei ~~(12)~~; Mercy Jerop ~~(13)~~	26	Japan: Ayuka Kazama (14); Ririka Hironaka (15); Chika Kosakai (21); Hazuki Doi (22); Miku Sakai ~~(29)~~; Hikari Ohnishi ~~(33)~~	72

== Medal table ==
Rank	Nation	Gold	Silver	Bronze	Total
1	Ethiopia	5	3	3	11
2	Kenya	2	3	3	8
3	Uganda	2	2	2	6
4	Morocco	0	1	0	1
5	Japan	0	0	1	1
Totals (5 entries)		9	9	9	27

- Note: Totals include both individual and team medals, with medals in the team competition counting as one medal.

== Participation ==
520 athletes from 63 countries were scheduled to participate:

- Algeria (8)
- Argentina (2)
- Athlete Refugee Team (2)
- Australia (23)
- Bahrain (10)
- Botswana (5)
- Brazil (8)
- Burundi (7)
- Canada (28)
- Chile (2)
- China (14)
- Colombia (2)
- Czech Republic (1)
- Denmark (28)
- Egypt (2)
- El Salvador (2)
- Eritrea (16)
- Ethiopia (28)
- France (16)
- Germany (1)
- Ghana (1)
- Great Britain (24)
- Hong Kong (2)
- India (2)
- Ireland (6)
- Italy (2)
- Japan (22)
- Kazakhstan (3)
- Kenya (27)
- Kyrgyzstan (1)
- Latvia (2)
- Lebanon (15)
- Libya (1)
- Luxembourg (2)
- Malta (2)
- Mauritius (1)
- Morocco (15)
- Namibia (2)
- New Zealand (16)
- Niger (1)
- Norway (1)
- Palestine (1)
- Peru (15)
- Poland (4)
- Portugal (1)
- Romania (2)
- Rwanda (4)
- Seychelles (2)
- Sierra Leone (4)
- Somalia (1)
- South Africa (21)
- Spain (24)
- Sudan (1)
- Sweden (3)
- Switzerland (1)
- Tanzania (16)
- Turkey (1)
- Uganda (27)
- Ukraine (4)
- United States (28)
- Uruguay (2)
- Zambia (3)
- Zimbabwe (2)
