= 2018 European 10,000m Cup =

- Organisers: EAA
- Edition: 22nd
- Date: May 19
- Host city: London, Great Britain (United Kingdom)
- Venue: Parliament Hill Athletics Track
- Events: 2
- Participation: 99 athletes from 25 nations
- Official website: Official website

The 2018 European 10,000m Cup took place on May 19, 2018. The races took place on Parliament Hill Athletics Track in London, Great Britain. The event was held together with the annual Night of the 10,000m PB's meeting.

== Medallists ==
Event	Gold	Silver	Bronze
Individual
Men	(Germany) Richard Ringer; 27 min 36 s 52 (PB)	(France) Morhad Amdouni; 27 min 36 s 80 (PB)	(Italy) Yemaneberhan Crippa; 27 min 44 s 21 (PB)
Women	(Israel) Lonah Chemtai Salpeter; 31 min 33 s 03 (WL, NR, PB)	(Romania) Ancuţa Bobocel; 31 min 43 s 12 (PB)	(United Kingdom) Charlotte Arter; 32 min 15 s 71 (PB)
Team
Men	Spain; 1 h 24 min 40 s 66	Great Britain; 1 h 25 min 03 s 32	France; 1 h 25 min 13 s 68
Women	Great Britain; 1 h 37 min 28 s 89	Romania; 1 h 37 min 35 s 06	Germany; 1 h 38 min 26 s 05

== Race results ==
=== Men's ===
Individual race
Rank	Heat	Athlete	Nationality	Time	Note
1st place, gold medalist(s)	A	Richard Ringer	Germany	27:36.52	PB
2nd place, silver medalist(s)	A	Morhad Amdouni	France	27:36.80	PB
3rd place, bronze medalist(s)	A	Yemaneberhan Crippa	Italy	27:44.21	NU23R
4	A	Adel Mechaal	Spain	27:50.56	PB
5	A	Alexander Yee	Great Britain	27:51.94	PB
6	A	Andy Vernon*	Great Britain	27:52.32	SB
7	A	Chris Thompson*	Great Britain	27:52.56	SB
8	A	Florian Carvalho	France	28:06.78	PB
9	A	Girmaw Amare	Israel	28:15.41	SB
10	A	Antonio Abadía	Spain	28:20.45	
11	A	Nicolae-Alexandru Soare	Romania	28:25.38	PB
12	A	Fernando Carro	Spain	28:29.65	
13	B	Lorenzo Dini	Italy	28:30.01	PB
14	A	Ben Connor	Great Britain	28:31.59	
15	A	Napoleon Solomon	Sweden	28:33.33	PB
16	B	Andreas Vojta	Austria	28:33.99	PB
17	B	Vasyl Koval	Ukraine	28:35.44	PB
18	A	Juan Pérez	Spain	28:35.59	SB
19	B	Kieran Clements*	Great Britain	28:37.12	PB
20	B	Félix Bour	France	28:37.61	PB
21	B	Dmytro Siruk	Ukraine	28:37.61	SB
22	A	Mohamud Aadan	Great Britain	28:39.79	PB
23	A	Yago Rojo	Spain	28:46.37	PB
24	A	Ellis Cross*	Great Britain	28:47.51	PB
25	A	Arttu Vattulainen	Finland	28:48.43	PB
26	B	Richard Allen*	Great Britain	28:54.95	PB
27	A	Tiidrek Nurme	Estonia	29:05.49	SB
28	A	Mykola Nyzhnyk	Ukraine	29:09.55	PB
29	B	Jakub Zemaník	Czech Republic	29:10.43	PB
30	A	Matthew Leach*	Great Britain	29:11.35	SB
31	B	Steven Casteele	Belgium	29:12.01	PB
32	A	Tadesse Getahon	Israel	29:12.17	
33	A	Graham Rush*	Great Britain	29:13.28	SB
34	B	Daniel Studley*	Great Britain	29:15.41	PB
35	A	Ollie Lockley*	Great Britain	29:15.45	PB
36	A	Mohamed Jelloul	Spain	29:16.27	
37	A	Luke Caldwell*	Great Britain	29:18.17	SB
38	A	Luke Traynor	Great Britain	29:20.32	SB
39	B	Stephan Listabarth	Austria	29:22.62	PB
40	A	Tomasz Grycko	Poland	29:24.84	
41	B	Serhiy Shevchenko	Ukraine	29:27.11	PB
42	B	Abderrazak Charik	France	29:27.60	PB
43	B	Jarkko Järvenpää	Finland	29:29.30	SB
44	B	Mohamed Serghini	France	29:30.10	
45	B	Joeri Wolf	Netherlands	29:34.16	PB
46	B	Ivan Strebkov	Ukraine	29:34.97	SB
47	B	Yann Schrub	France	29:35.23	
48	B	Mick Clohisey	Ireland	29:36.42	SB
49	B	Dominic Shaw*	Great Britain	29:39.04	PB
50	B	Sullivan Brunet	Switzerland	29:39.65	PB
51	A	Jean-Pierre Weerts	Belgium	29:39.65	SB
52	B	Hugh Armstrong	Ireland	29:49.51	
53	B	António Silva	Portugal	29:51.07	SB
54	B	Logan Rees*	Great Britain	29:55.26	PB
55	A	Haimro Alame	Israel	29:59.15	
56	B	Yeoryios-Mihail Tassis	Greece	30:00.64	PB
57	B	Christian Kreienbühl	Switzerland	30:08.29	SB
58	B	Patrik Wägeli	Switzerland	30:13.94	PB
59	B	Sergiu Ciobanu	Ireland	30:15.95	SB
60	B	Stoian Vladkov	Bulgaria	30:42.34	PB
61	A	Sam Stabler	Great Britain	31:16.81	SB
	A	Lachlan Oates*	Great Britain	DNF	
	A	Cornelius Kangogo	Kenya	DNF	Pace
	A	David Bett	Kenya	DNF	Pace
	B	Malcolm Hicks*	New Zealand	DNF	
	B	Alberto Sánchez	Spain	DNF	
	B	Daniel Studley*	Great Britain	DNF	
	B	Abel Tsegay	Eritrea	DNF	Pace
	B	Ricardo Dias	Portugal	DNF	
	B	Yosi Goasdoué	France	DNF	
	B	Robin Ryynänen	Finland	DNF	
	B	Gabriel Steffensen	Sweden	DNF	
	B	Olle Walleräng	Sweden	DNF	

Teams
Rank	Team	Time
1st place, gold medalist(s)	Spain	1:24:40.66
2nd place, silver medalist(s)	Great Britain	1:25:03.32
3rd place, bronze medalist(s)	France	1:25:13.68
4	Ukraine	1:26:23.06
5	Israel	1:27:26.73
6	Ireland	1:29:41.88
6	Switzerland	1:30:01.88

=== Women's ===
Individual race
Rank	Heat	Athlete	Nationality	Time	Note
1st place, gold medalist(s)	A	Lonah Chemtai Salpeter	Israel	31:33.03	WL, NR, PB
2nd place, silver medalist(s)	A	Ancuţa Bobocel	Romania	31:43.12	PB
3rd place, bronze medalist(s)	A	Charlotte Arter	Great Britain	32:15.71	PB
4	B	Roxana Bârcă	Romania	32:30.97	PB
5	A	Katarzyna Rutkowska	Poland	32:31.40	PB
6	A	Philippa Bowden*	Great Britain	32:33.10	PB
7	A	Sophie Duarte	France	32:34.07	PB
8	A	Louise Small	Great Britain	32:34.73	PB
9	A	Stevie Stockton*	Great Britain	32:35.26	PB
10	A	Katrina Wootton*	Great Britain	32:37.80	SB
11	A	Jenny Nesbitt	Great Britain	32:38.45	PB
12	A	Emelia Gorecka	Great Britain	32:39.37	PB
13	A	Miriam Dattke	Germany	32:40.58	PB
14	A	Natalie Tanner	Germany	32:44.52	
15	A	Maitane Melero	Spain	32:50.30	PB
16	A	Claire Duck	Great Britain	32:52.85	SB
17	A	Emma Mitchell	Ireland	32:55.26	
18	A	Yuliya Shmatenko	Ukraine	32:57.31	PB
19	A	Sabrina Mockenhaupt	Germany	33:00.95	SB
20	A	Tania Carretero	Spain	33:04.43	PB
21	A	Kate Avery*	Great Britain	33:05.24	SB
22	A	Krisztina Papp	Hungary	33:05.80	SB
23	A	Nuria Lugueros	Spain	33:08.03	
24	B	Viktoriya Kalyuzhna	Ukraine	33:10.66	PB
25	B	Valeriya Zinenko	Ukraine	33:12.30	PB
26	A	Charlotta Fougberg	Sweden	33:13.44	PB
27	B	Giovanna Epis	Italy	33:14.71	PB
28	A	Jip Vastenburg	Netherlands	33:14.97	SB
29	B	Cristina Simion	Romania	33:20.97	PB
30	A	Cátia Santos	Portugal	33:21.98	PB
31	B	Shona Heaslip	Ireland	33:24.00	PB
32	A	Mhairi Maclennan*	Great Britain	33:28.61	PB
33	B	Nataliya Lehonkova	Ukraine	33:31.78	PB
34	A	Ellie Davies*	Great Britain	33:33.20	PB
35	B	Moira Stewartová	Czech Republic	33:41.17	PB
36	A	Faye Fullerton	Great Britain	33:47.70	PB
37	B	Fionnuala Ross	Ireland	33:49.92	PB
38	A	AnnMarie McGlynn	Ireland	33:53.29	SB
39	B	Nicole Taylor*	Great Britain	33:53.34	PB
40	A	Ana Lozano	Spain	33:55.94	PB
41	B	Lucy Reid*	Great Britain	33:58.73	PB
42	B	Tamara Armoush*	Jordan	34:00.81	PB
43	B	Martina Tresch	Switzerland	34:07.04	PB
44	A	Ashley Gibson*	Great Britain	34:08.53	PB
45	B	Nicole Reina	Italy	34:09.14	PB
46	B	Anastasia Karakatsani	Greece	34:10.95	SB
47	B	Andreea Alina Piscu	Romania	34:12.80	SB
48	B	Maor Tiyouri	Israel	34:13.67	
49	B	Charlotte Christensen*	Great Britain	34:22.33	PB
50	B	Lucy Crookes*	United States	34:29.68	SB
51	A	Dani Nimmock*	Great Britain	34:47.32	PB
52	B	Elena García	Spain	34:47.49	
53	B	Sara Brogiato	Italy	35:19.33	SB
54	B	Maria Sagnes Wågan	Norway	35:19.86	SB
55	B	Rosie Edwards*	Great Britain	36:00.66	SB
56	B	Cecilia Norrbom	Sweden	36:02.93	SB
57	B	Loreta Kančytė	Lithuania	36:16.97	PB
	A	María José Pérez	Spain	DNF	
	A	Samira Mezeghrane	France	DNF	
	A	Anne-Mari Hyryläinen	Finland	DNF	
	A	Margaret Kipkemboi	Kenya	DNF	Pace
	B	Runa Skrove Falch	Norway	DNF	
	B	Sarah Astin*	Great Britain	DNF	
	B	Eva Cherono	Kenya	DNF	Pace
	B	Iona Lake*	Great Britain	DNF	

Teams
Rank	Team	Time
1st place, gold medalist(s)	Great Britain	1:37:28.89
2nd place, silver medalist(s)	Romania	1:37:35.06
3rd place, bronze medalist(s)	Germany	1:38:26.05
4	Spain	1:39:02.76
5	Ukraine	1:39:20.27
6	Ireland	1:40:09.18
7	Italy	1:42:43.18

* Athletes who competed in the Night of the 10,000m PBs but were not entered for the European Cup. The results of these athletes were not counted towards the final team score.

== Medal table ==
The host country is highlighted in lavender blue

Rank	Nation	Gold	Silver	Bronze	Total
1	Great Britain (GBR)*	1	1	1	3
2	Germany (GER)	1	0	1	2
3	Israel (ISR)	1	0	0	1
3	Spain (ESP)	1	0	0	1
5	Romania (ROM)	0	2	0	2
6	France (FRA)	0	1	1	2
7	Italy (ITA)	0	0	1	1
Totals (7 entries)		4	4	4	12
