= 2018 IAAF World Half Marathon Championships =

- Host city: Valencia, Spain
- Nations: 80 (Note: 79 countries, plus the Athlete Refugee Team)
- Athletes: 279
- Events: 2
- Dates: 24 March 2018
- Race length: 21.0975 km (13.1 mi)

The 2018 IAAF World Half Marathon Championships took place on 24 March 2018 in Valencia, Spain. It was the 23rd edition of the event and the 2nd time it was held in Spain.

Netsanet Gudeta gave the standout performance of the competition, winning with a half marathon world record of 1:06:11 hours in a women-only race. This improved Lornah Kiplagat's eleven-year-old championships record by 14 seconds and marked a personal improvement of over a minute. She led the Ethiopian women (alongside fifth and sixth placers Zeineba Yimer and Meseret Belete) to the team title with a combined time of 3:22:27 hours. The outright world record holder Joyciline Jepkosgei settled for second and her third-placed compatriot Pauline Kaveke Kamulu helped Kenya to second in the team competition. The best performance by a non-African-born runner was by Romania's Ancuţa Bobocel, who set a personal best in 15th place.

In the men's race Kenya's Geoffrey Kipsang Kamworor took his third straight title in 1:00:02 hours (nearly a minute short of his championship record). Bahrain's Abraham Naibei Cheroben claimed the silver medal 20 seconds further back and Aron Kifle was the bronze medallist around half a minute short of the winner. The winning men's team, Ethiopia, contained no medallists but Jemal Yimer, Getaneh Molla and Betesfa Getahun rounded out the top six. The best non-African-born performer was Julien Wanders of Switzerland who managed eighth place in 1:01:03 hours.

A total of 151 men (including 23 teams) finished the distance, with five men failing to finish the distance and three entrants being non-starters. A total of 122 women (including 19 teams) entered and started the race, with 117 finishers. Seven men's and seven women's national records were broken at the competition. Abdelaziz Guerziz of Algeria finished in 61st place but he was disqualified for four years in February 2019 with his results from 6 February 2018 onwards being disqualified.

Sopot, Poland was defeated in the bidding process. Copenhagen, Denmark was also in the running to host.

In conjunction with the men's elite race, an open half marathon was held on the same course for 14,577 competitors.

== Medallists ==
Event	Gold		Silver		Bronze	
Individual
Men	Geoffrey Kamworor (KEN)	1:00:02	Abraham Cheroben (BHR)	1:00:22	Aron Kifle (ERI)	1:00:31
Women	Netsanet Gudeta (ETH)	1:06:11	Joyciline Jepkosgei (KEN)	1:06:54	Pauline Kaveke (KEN)	1:06:56
Team
Men	Ethiopia	3:02:14	Kenya	3:02:40	Bahrain	3:02:52
Women	Ethiopia	3:22:27	Kenya	3:23:02	Bahrain	3:23:39

== Race results ==
Results for the men's and women's elite races are shown below. Results for the open race are kept separately.

=== Men ===
Rank	Athlete	Nationality	Time	Notes
1st place, gold medalist(s)	Geoffrey Kipsang Kamworor	Kenya (KEN)	1:00:02	SB
2nd place, silver medalist(s)	Abraham Naibei Cheroben	Bahrain (BHR)	1:00:22	SB
3rd place, bronze medalist(s)	Aron Kifle	Eritrea (ERI)	1:00:31	PB
4	Jemal Yimer	Ethiopia (ETH)	1:00:33	
5	Getaneh Molla	Ethiopia (ETH)	1:00:47	SB
6	Betesfa Getahun	Ethiopia (ETH)	1:00:54	PB
7	Amanuel Mesel	Eritrea (ERI)	1:00:58	SB
8	Julien Wanders	Switzerland (SUI)	1:01:03	
9	Kaan Kigen Ozbilen	Turkey (TUR)	1:01:05	SB
10	Leul Gebresilase	Ethiopia (ETH)	1:01:07	SB
11	Aweke Ayalew	Bahrain (BHR)	1:01:09	PB
12	Leonard Kiplimo Barsoton	Kenya (KEN)	1:01:14	SB
13	Albert Rop	Bahrain (BHR)	1:01:21	PB
14	Sam Chelanga	United States (USA)	1:01:23	
15	Barselius Kipyego	Kenya (KEN)	1:01:24	SB
16	Stephen Mokoka	South Africa (RSA)	1:01:26	SB
17	Nguse Amlosom	Eritrea (ERI)	1:01:34	SB
18	Jorum Lumbasi Okombo	Kenya (KEN)	1:01:34	
19	Afewerki Berhane	Eritrea (ERI)	1:01:37	SB
20	Fred Musobo	Uganda (UGA)	1:01:38	PB
21	El Hassan Elabbassi	Bahrain (BHR)	1:01:41	SB
22	Koen Naert	Belgium (BEL)	1:01:42	PB
23	Jiksa Tolosa	Ethiopia (ETH)	1:01:50	PB
24	Suguru Osako	Japan (JPN)	1:01:56	SB
25	Abrar Osman	Eritrea (ERI)	1:02:05	SB
26	Felix Chemonges	Uganda (UGA)	1:02:10	PB
27	Willy Canchanya	Peru (PER)	1:02:11	NR
28	Ayad Lamdassem	Spain (ESP)	1:02:14	SB
29	Abdi Hakin Ulad	Denmark (DEN)	1:02:15	PB
30	Cameron Levins	Canada (CAN)	1:02:15	PB
31	Bernard Lagat	United States (USA)	1:02:16	
32	Juan Luis Barrios	Mexico (MEX)	1:02:18	SB
33	Maru Teferi	Israel (ISR)	1:02:24	NR
34	John Hakizimana	Rwanda (RWA)	1:02:26	PB
35	Moses Martin Kurong	Uganda (UGA)	1:02:27	
36	Mohamud Ibrahim Aadan	Great Britain (GBR)	1:02:34	PB
37	Eyob Ghebrehiwet	Italy (ITA)	1:02:37	PB
38	Luke Traynor	Great Britain (GBR)	1:02:38	
39	Camilo Santiago	Spain (ESP)	1:02:40	PB
40	Benjamin Choquert	France (FRA)	1:02:46	PB
41	Elroy Gelant	South Africa (RSA)	1:02:52	SB
42	Noel Hitimana	Rwanda (RWA)	1:02:53	PB
43	Mikael Ekvall	Sweden (SWE)	1:02:54	SB
44	Lesiba Precious Mashele	South Africa (RSA)	1:02:58	SB
45	Haimro Almaya	Israel (ISR)	1:03:04	PB
46	Kenta Murayama	Japan (JPN)	1:03:07	
47	Jose Luis Ostos	Peru (PER)	1:03:09	PB
48	Luis Alberto Orta	Venezuela (VEN)	1:03:09	NR
49	Mohamed Hrezi	Libya (LBA)	1:03:11	
50	Cristhian Pacheco	Peru (PER)	1:03:15	PB
51	Derlys Ayala	Paraguay (PAR)	1:03:19	NR
52	Girmaw Amare	Israel (ISR)	1:03:19	PB
53	Peter Herzog	Austria (AUT)	1:03:22	PB
54	Olivier Irabaruta	Burundi (BDI)	1:03:23	SB
55	Yimer Getahun	Israel (ISR)	1:03:25	PB
56	Bayron Piedra	Ecuador (ECU)	1:03:29	SB
57	Segundo Jami	Ecuador (ECU)	1:03:31	PB
58	Houssame Eddine Benabbou	Spain (ESP)	1:03:35	PB
59	Florian Carvalho	France (FRA)	1:03:40	PB
60	Melikhaya Frans	South Africa (RSA)	1:03:42	SB
61	Collis Birmingham	Australia (AUS)	1:03:44	SB
62	Roman Fosti	Estonia (EST)	1:03:45	PB
63	Benjamin Connor	Great Britain (GBR)	1:03:45	
64	Jiří Homoláč	Czech Republic (CZE)	1:03:45	SB
65	Dejen Gebreselassie	Australia (AUS)	1:03:47	PB
66	Benjamin Malaty	France (FRA)	1:03:54	PB
67	Lemawork Ketema	Austria (AUT)	1:03:57	PB
68	Diego Estrada	United States (USA)	1:03:59	
69	Roman Romanenko	Ukraine (UKR)	1:04:03	SB
70	Hayato Sonoda	Japan (JPN)	1:04:12	
71	Thomas Do Canto	Australia (AUS)	1:04:18	PB
72	Alex Mutai	Uganda (UGA)	1:04:24	PB
73	Lorenzo Dini	Italy (ITA)	1:04:26	SB
74	Maamar Bengriba	Algeria (ALG)	1:04:26	
75	Jesús Torres	Mexico (MEX)	1:04:27	PB
76	Paul Pollock	Ireland (IRL)	1:04:29	SB
77	Ernesto Andrés Zamora	Uruguay (URU)	1:04:30	PB
78	Geoffrey Martinson	Canada (CAN)	1:04:34	
79	Enzo Yáñez	Chile (CHI)	1:04:37	PB
80	Miguel Ángel Barzola	Argentina (ARG)	1:04:39	SB
81	Daisuke Uekado	Japan (JPN)	1:04:48	
82	Jared Ward	United States (USA)	1:04:49	
83	Christian Vasconez	Ecuador (ECU)	1:04:53	PB
84	Kevin Seaward	Ireland (IRL)	1:04:56	SB
85	Juan Antonio Pérez	Spain (ESP)	1:05:01	
86	Mariano Mastromarino	Argentina (ARG)	1:05:03	SB
87	Jean-Pierre Castro	Peru (PER)	1:05:06	PB
88	Jaume Leiva	Spain (ESP)	1:05:09	
89	Christian Steinhammer	Austria (AUT)	1:05:09	PB
90	Yoseph-Fabien Goasdoue	France (FRA)	1:05:18	
91	Stephen Scullion	Ireland (IRL)	1:05:19	
92	Félix Bour	France (FRA)	1:05:22	
93	Yusuf Alici	Turkey (TUR)	1:05:40	
94	Farid Terfia	Algeria (ALG)	1:05:44	
95	Jacob Mugomeri	Zimbabwe (ZIM)	1:06:11	PB
96	Janis Viskers	Latvia (LAT)	1:06:11	PB
97	Nicolae Alexandru Soare	Romania (ROU)	1:06:14	SB
98	Leslie Encina	Chile (CHI)	1:06:18	SB
99	Daviti Kharazishvili	Georgia (GEO)	1:06:19	SB
100	Sergiu Ciobanu	Ireland (IRL)	1:06:19	SB
101	Dmitrijs Serjogins	Latvia (LAT)	1:06:20	PB
102	Daniel Studley	Great Britain (GBR)	1:06:20	
103	Valdas Dopolskas	Lithuania (LTU)	1:06:24	PB
104	Aykut Taşdemir	Turkey (TUR)	1:06:25	
105	El Hadi Laameche	Algeria (ALG)	1:06:27	PB
106	Jesper Faurschou	Denmark (DEN)	1:06:42	SB
107	Kota Murayama	Japan (JPN)	1:06:49	
108	Mikhail Krasilov	Kazakhstan (KAZ)	1:06:49	SB
109	David Gakuru	Rwanda (RWA)	1:07:02	PB
110	Sami Jibril	Canada (CAN)	1:07:11	
111	Tomas Hilifa Rainhold	Namibia (NAM)	1:07:15	SB
112	Ignas Brasevicius	Lithuania (LTU)	1:07:16	PB
113	Mbongeni Ngxazozo	South Africa (RSA)	1:07:16	
114	Evan Esselink	Canada (CAN)	1:07:20	
115	Chao Xie	China (CHN)	1:07:24	PB
116	Arnar Pétursson	Iceland (ISL)	1:07:29	PB
117	César Lizano	Costa Rica (CRC)	1:07:38	SB
118	Ser-Od Bat-Ochir	Mongolia (MGL)	1:07:48	SB
119	Salem Mohamed Attiaallah	Egypt (EGY)	1:07:51	PB
120	Ukuk Utho'o Bul	Athlete Refugee Team (ART)	1:08:15	PB
121	Rui Yong Soh	Singapore (SGP)	1:08:28	SB
122	Sergio Dias	Cape Verde (CPV)	1:09:10	
123	Danijel Fak	Croatia (CRO)	1:09:20	SB
124	Paulo Amotun Lokoro	Athlete Refugee Team (ART)	1:09:31	NR
125	Andrey Leymenov	Kazakhstan (KAZ)	1:09:31	SB
126	Ahmad Smour	Jordan (JOR)	1:09:33	SB
127	Oscar Antonio Aldana	El Salvador (ESA)	1:09:43	NR
128	Valentin Betoudji	Chad (CHA)	1:09:46	PB
129	Alexey Gussarov	Kazakhstan (KAZ)	1:09:49	PB
130	Charlton Debono	Malta (MLT)	1:10:11	SB
131	Antoni Bernadó	Andorra (AND)	1:10:19	SB
132	Jonathan Atse Herrera	Ivory Coast (CIV)	1:11:00	SB
133	Amir Baitukanov	Kazakhstan (KAZ)	1:11:04	SB
134	Hussein Ahmed	Egypt (EGY)	1:12:11	SB
135	Kevin Dooney	Ireland (IRL)	1:12:14	
136	Sakirjan Durdyýew	Turkmenistan (TKM)	1:12:22	
137	Adrian Pillajo	Ecuador (ECU)	1:12:39	PB
138	Arnold Rogers	Gibraltar (GIB)	1:13:33	
139	Jinrun Liu	China (CHN)	1:13:44	PB
140	Antun Pavelić	Croatia (CRO)	1:13:45	SB
141	Shifaz Mohamed	Maldives (MDV)	1:14:23	NR
142	Artem Kosinov	Kazakhstan (KAZ)	1:15:26	SB
143	Francesc Josep Carmona Parada	Andorra (AND)	1:15:53	PB
144	Kuan Un Iao	Macau (MAC)	1:16:22	SB
145	Nuri Kömür	Turkey (TUR)	1:16:29	
146	Sonny Folcheri	Monaco (MON)	1:18:53	PB
147	Charles Savignon	Gibraltar (GIB)	1:20:06	PB
148	Maurice Turnock	Gibraltar (GIB)	1:22:34	
149	Mehrubon Shamsidinov	Tajikistan (TJK)	1:23:06	PB
150	Tibor Sahajda	Slovakia (SVK)	1:25:05	SB
151	Ilir Këllezi	Albania (ALB)	1:26:04	SB
152	Alrric Leroy Kock	Aruba (ARU)	1:38:06	PB
—	Abdelaziz Guerziz	Algeria (ALG)	DQ	
—	Alex Oloitiptip Korio	Kenya (KEN)	DNF	
—	Leonard Korir	United States (USA)	DNF	
—	Rok Puhar	Slovenia (SLO)	DNF	
—	Tsegai Tewelde	Great Britain (GBR)	DNF	
—	Mustapha Eskimo Kamara	Sierra Leone (SLE)	DNS	
—	Moses Kibet	Uganda (UGA)	DNS	
—	Abdi Daud Roble	Somalia (SOM)	DNS	

=== Women ===
Rank	Athlete	Nationality	Time	Notes
1st place, gold medalist(s)	Netsanet Gudeta Kebede	Ethiopia (ETH)	1:06:11	WR_{wo}
2nd place, silver medalist(s)	Joyciline Jepkosgei	Kenya (KEN)	1:06:54	
3rd place, bronze medalist(s)	Pauline Kaveke Kamulu	Kenya (KEN)	1:06:56	PB
4	Eunice Chebichii Chumba	Bahrain (BHR)	1:07:17	SB
5	Zeineba Yimer	Ethiopia (ETH)	1:08:07	PB
6	Meseret Belete	Ethiopia (ETH)	1:08:09	PB
7	Desi Mokonin	Bahrain (BHR)	1:08:10	PB
8	Bekelech Gudeta	Ethiopia (ETH)	1:08:12	PB
9	Dalila Abdulkadir	Bahrain (BHR)	1:08:12	PB
10	Shitaye Eshete	Bahrain (BHR)	1:08:25	PB
11	Zinash Mekonnen	Ethiopia (ETH)	1:08:30	PB
12	Lonah Chemtai Salpeter	Israel (ISR)	1:08:58	NR
13	Ruth Chepngetich	Kenya (KEN)	1:09:12	SB
14	Rose Chelimo	Bahrain (BHR)	1:10:20	SB
15	Ancuţa Bobocel	Romania (ROU)	1:10:21	PB
16	Fabienne Schlumpf	Switzerland (SUI)	1:10:36	SB
17	Kaori Morita	Japan (JPN)	1:10:46	
18	Volha Mazuronak	Belarus (BLR)	1:10:57	NR
19	Mao Ichiyama	Japan (JPN)	1:11:02	SB
20	Dolshi Tesfu	Eritrea (ERI)	1:11:09	PB
21	Charlotte Purdue	Great Britain (GBR)	1:11:21	
22	Deshun Zhang	China (CHN)	1:11:28	PB
23	Sinead Diver	Australia (AUS)	1:11:40	PB
24	Ellie Pashley	Australia (AUS)	1:11:43	PB
25	Nolene Conrad	South Africa (RSA)	1:11:44	PB
26	Nazret Weldu	Eritrea (ERI)	1:11:45	SB
27	Emma Bates	United States (USA)	1:11:45	PB
28	Clémence Calvin	France (FRA)	1:11:51	SB
29	Gladys Tejeda	Peru (PER)	1:11:52	SB
30	Sasha Gollish	Canada (CAN)	1:11:52	SB
31	Charlotte Arter	Great Britain (GBR)	1:11:52	
32	Inés Melchor	Peru (PER)	1:11:55	PB
33	Trihas Gebre	Spain (ESP)	1:12:02	SB
34	Luz Mery Rojas	Peru (PER)	1:12:05	PB
35	Honami Maeda	Japan (JPN)	1:12:09	SB
36	Lilia Fisikovici	Moldova (MDA)	1:12:11	NR
37	Nastassia Ivanova	Belarus (BLR)	1:12:15	PB
38	Kokob Tesfagabriel	Eritrea (ERI)	1:12:15	PB
39	Luula Weldegebriel	Eritrea (ERI)	1:12:19	PB
40	Giovanna Epis	Italy (ITA)	1:12:27	PB
41	Rebecca Wade	United States (USA)	1:12:31	
42	Nina Savina	Belarus (BLR)	1:12:31	SB
43	Tracy Barlow	Great Britain (GBR)	1:12:35	PB
44	Eva Vrabcová Nývltová	Czech Republic (CZE)	1:12:54	SB
45	Florencia Borelli	Argentina (ARG)	1:13:10	SB
46	Lizzie Lee	Ireland (IRL)	1:13:19	PB
47	Victoria Coates	Canada (CAN)	1:13:35	PB
48	Gemma Steel	Great Britain (GBR)	1:13:39	
49	Doreen Chesang	Uganda (UGA)	1:13:52	PB
50	Kinsey Middleton	Canada (CAN)	1:13:52	
51	Sara Brogiato	Italy (ITA)	1:13:53	PB
52	Angie Orjuela	Colombia (COL)	1:13:55	SB
53	Faye Fullerton	Great Britain (GBR)	1:13:56	PB
54	Esmeralda Rebollo	Mexico (MEX)	1:14:18	PB
55	Elena Loyo	Spain (ESP)	1:14:19	
56	Rosa Chacha	Ecuador (ECU)	1:14:19	SB
57	Claire McCarthy	Ireland (IRL)	1:14:20	PB
58	Bojana Bjeljac	Croatia (CRO)	1:14:24	PB
59	Sophie Duarte	France (FRA)	1:14:30	SB
60	Marta Esteban	Spain (ESP)	1:14:47	
61	Büsra Nur Koku	Turkey (TUR)	1:14:49	
62	Roxana Elisabeta Birca	Romania (ROU)	1:14:51	SB
63	Teresa Urbina	Spain (ESP)	1:14:53	
64	Elaina Tabb	United States (USA)	1:14:55	
65	Samira Mezeghrane	France (FRA)	1:14:56	SB
66	Maor Tiyouri	Israel (ISR)	1:15:03	SB
67	Soumaya Boussaïd	Tunisia (TUN)	1:15:11	NR
68	Cristina Simion	Romania (ROU)	1:15:15	PB
69	Emily Chebet	Uganda (UGA)	1:15:18	PB
70	Yuka Hori	Japan (JPN)	1:15:24	
71	Sofiia Yaremchuk	Ukraine (UKR)	1:15:27	SB
72	Patiance Murowe	Zimbabwe (ZIM)	1:15:30	PB
73	Kidanu Teshome	Eritrea (ERI)	1:15:49	PB
74	Chien-Ho Hsieh	Chinese Taipei (TPE)	1:15:56	
75	Anja Scherl	Germany (GER)	1:16:13	SB
76	Janet Dlamini	South Africa (RSA)	1:16:23	SB
77	Remziye Temel	Turkey (TUR)	1:16:23	PB
78	Laura Graham	Ireland (IRL)	1:16:27	
79	Laura Shaughnessy	Ireland (IRL)	1:16:28	SB
80	Paula-Claudia Todoran	Romania (ROU)	1:16:40	SB
81	Jacqueline Gandar	France (FRA)	1:16:46	SB
82	Fionnuala Ross	Ireland (IRL)	1:16:53	SB
83	Tatiele Roberta de Carvalho	Brazil (BRA)	1:16:58	
84	Beata Naigambo	Namibia (NAM)	1:17:14	SB
85	Irene Pelayo	Spain (ESP)	1:17:16	
86	Emily Setlack	Canada (CAN)	1:17:30	
87	Vaida Žūsinaitė	Lithuania (LTU)	1:17:38	SB
88	Ilona Marhele	Latvia (LAT)	1:17:51	SB
89	Tonya Nero	Trinidad and Tobago (TTO)	1:17:55	SB
90	Andreea-Alina Pîscu	Romania (ROU)	1:18:17	SB
91	Cornelia Joubert	South Africa (RSA)	1:18:23	SB
92	Mapaseka Makhanya	South Africa (RSA)	1:18:43	SB
93	Jenny Mendez	Costa Rica (CRC)	1:18:47	PB
94	Paule Marie Perrier	Mauritius (MRI)	1:19:31	PB
95	Adha Munguleya	Uganda (UGA)	1:19:36	SB
96	Ruiling Li	China (CHN)	1:19:41	PB
97	Lebogang Phalula	South Africa (RSA)	1:19:41	SB
98	Liying Shi	China (CHN)	1:19:42	SB
99	Andrea Kolbeinsdóttir	Iceland (ISL)	1:19:46	PB
100	Diana Landi	Ecuador (ECU)	1:20:00	
101	Esma Aydemir	Turkey (TUR)	1:20:41	
102	Fadouwa Ledhem	France (FRA)	1:20:54	
103	Lisa Marie Bezzina	Malta (MLT)	1:20:58	SB
104	Elín Edda Sigurðardóttir	Iceland (ISL)	1:21:20	PB
105	Jane Vongvorachoti	Thailand (THA)	1:21:52	
106	Zhanna Mamazhanova	Kazakhstan (KAZ)	1:22:35	SB
107	Dana Aydosova	Kazakhstan (KAZ)	1:22:43	PB
108	María Caballero	Paraguay (PAR)	1:23:08	SB
109	Nesma Ammar Saad Mohamed Abdelghany	Egypt (EGY)	1:26:52	NR
110	Emma Montiel	Gibraltar (GIB)	1:27:58	SB
111	Allison Edwards	Gibraltar (GIB)	1:28:21	PB
112	Kim Baglietto	Gibraltar (GIB)	1:29:50	
113	Dulce Casanova Martínez	Andorra (AND)	1:32:27	
114	Yangyang Wu	Macau (MAC)	1:32:38	SB
115	Mariyam Abdul Kareem	Maldives (MDV)	1:33:37	NR
116	Bethan Perera	Gibraltar (GIB)	1:33:46	PB
117	Olena Hudaybergenova	Turkmenistan (TKM)	1:48:29	
—	Dailín Belmonte	Cuba (CUB)	DNF	
—	Sviatlana Kudzelich	Belarus (BLR)	DNF	
—	Matea Matosević	Croatia (CRO)	DNF	
—	Yelena Nanaziashvili	Kazakhstan (KAZ)	DNF	
—	Şeyma Yildiz	Turkey (TUR)	DNF	

== Team standings ==
=== Men ===
Rank	Country	Time
1	Ethiopia (ETH)	3:02:14
2	Kenya (KEN)	3:02:40
3	Bahrain (BHR)	3:02:52
4	Eritrea (ERI)	3:03:03
5	Uganda (UGA)	3:06:15
6	South Africa (RSA)	3:07:16
7	United States (USA)	3:07:38
8	Spain (ESP)	3:08:29
9	Peru (PER)	3:08:35
10	Israel (ISR)	3:08:47
11	Great Britain (GBR)	3:08:57
12	Japan (JPN)	3:09:15
13	France (FRA)	3:10:20
14	Australia (AUS)	3:11:49
15	Ecuador (ECU)	3:11:53
16	Rwanda (RWA)	3:12:21
17	Austria (AUT)	3:12:28
18	Turkey (TUR)	3:13:10
19	Algeria (ALG)	3:13:52
20	Canada (CAN)	3:14:00
21	Ireland (IRL)	3:14:44
22	Kazakhstan (KAZ)	3:26:09
23	Gibraltar (GIB)	3:56:13

=== Women ===
Rank	Country	Time
1	Ethiopia (ETH)	3:22:27
2	Kenya (KEN)	3:23:02
3	Bahrain (BHR)	3:23:39
4	Japan (JPN)	3:33:57
5	Eritrea (ERI)	3:35:09
6	Belarus (BLR)	3:35:43
7	Great Britain (GBR)	3:35:48
8	Peru (PER)	3:35:52
9	United States (USA)	3:39:11
10	Canada (CAN)	3:39:19
11	Romania (ROM)	3:40:27
12	Spain (ESP)	3:41:08
13	France (FRA)	3:41:17
14	Ireland (IRL)	3:44:06
15	South Africa (RSA)	3:46:30
16	Uganda (UGA)	3:48:46
17	China (CHN)	3:50:51
18	Turkey (TUR)	3:51:53
19	Gibraltar (GIB)	4:26:09

== Medal table (unofficial) ==
Rank	Nation	Gold	Silver	Bronze	Total
1	Ethiopia (ETH)	3	0	0	3
2	Kenya (KEN)	1	3	1	5
3	Bahrain (BHR)	0	1	2	3
4	Eritrea (ERI)	0	0	1	1
Totals (4 entries)		4	4	4	12

== Participation ==
An unofficial count yields the participation of 279 athletes from 79 countries and the Athlete Refugee Team, which is a record for this event. Although announced, the athletes from Sierra Leone and Somalia did not show.

- Albania (1)
- Algeria (4)
- Andorra (3)
- Argentina (3)
- Aruba (1)
- Athlete Refugee Team (2)
- Australia (5)
- Austria (3)
- Bahrain (9)
- Belarus (4)
- Belgium (1)
- Brazil (1)
- Burundi (1)
- Canada (8)
- Cape Verde (1)
- Chad (1)
- Chile (2)
- China (5)
- Chinese Taipei (1)
- Colombia (1)
- Costa Rica (2)
- Croatia (4)
- Cuba (1)
- Czech Republic (2)
- Denmark (2)
- Ecuador (6)
- Egypt (3)
- El Salvador (1)
- Eritrea (10)
- Estonia (1)
- Ethiopia (10)
- France (10)
- Georgia (1)
- Germany (1)
- Gibraltar (7)
- Great Britain (10)
- Iceland (3)
- Ireland (10)
- Israel (6)
- Italy (4)
- Ivory Coast (1)
- Japan (9)
- Jordan (1)
- Kazakhstan (8)
- Kenya (8)
- Latvia (3)
- Libya (1)
- Lithuania (3)
- Macau (2)
- Maldives (2)
- Malta (2)
- Mauritius (1)
- Mexico (3)
- Moldova (1)
- Monaco (1)
- Mongolia (1)
- Namibia (2)
- Paraguay (2)
- Peru (7)
- Romania (6)
- Rwanda (3)
- Singapore (1)
- Slovakia (1)
- Slovenia (1)
- South Africa (10)
- Spain (10)
- Switzerland (2)
- Sweden (1)
- Tajikistan (1)
- Thailand (1)
- Trinidad and Tobago (1)
- Tunisia (1)
- Turkey (8)
- Turkmenistan (2)
- Uganda (7)
- Ukraine (2)
- United States (8)
- Uruguay (1)
- Venezuela (1)
- Zimbabwe (2)
