= 2013 European Athletics U23 Championships – Women's 10,000 metres =

The women's 10,000 metres event at the 2013 European Athletics U23 Championships was held in Tampere, Finland, at Ratina Stadium on 12 July.

== Medalists ==
Gold	Gulshat Fazlitdinova; Russia
Silver	Viktoriya Khapilina; Ukraine
Bronze	Anastasía Karakatsáni; Greece

== Results ==
=== Final ===
12 July 2013

Rank	Name	Nationality	Time	Notes
1st place, gold medalist(s)	Gulshat Fazlitdinova	Russia	32:53.93	
2nd place, silver medalist(s)	Viktoriya Khapilina	Ukraine	33:56.85	
3rd place, bronze medalist(s)	Anastasía Karakatsáni	Greece	33:57.74	NUR
4	Tania Carretero	Spain	34:02.62	PB
5	Burcu Büyükbezgin	Turkey	34:37.62	PB
6	Réka Czebei	Hungary	34:59.41	SB
7	Ionela Ecaterina Dinca	Romania	35:02.76	PB
8	Sara Galimberti	Italy	35:15.65	PB
9	Rhona Auckland	United Kingdom	35:17.50	
10	Tatsiana Stsefanenka	Belarus	35:36.13	PB
11	Laura Papagna	Italy	35:39.11	
12	Marion Joly Testault	France	35:59.47	
13	Marta Martins	Portugal	36:07.27	
14	Karoline Egeland Skatteboe	Norway	36:27.90	
15	Virginia Maria Abate	Italy	36:31.20	
16	Nina Persson	Sweden	36:49.65	
17	Petra Kubešová	Czech Republic	37:06.46	
18	Sevilay Eytemiş	Turkey	37:31.34	
19	Cristina Negru	Romania	37:50.84	
	Sanna Mustonen	Sweden	DNF	

Intermediate times:
1000m: 3:19.16 Gulshat Fazlitdinova Russia
2000m: 6:39.09 Gulshat Fazlitdinova Russia
3000m: 9:59.94 Gulshat Fazlitdinova Russia
4000m: 13:19.30 Gulshat Fazlitdinova Russia
5000m: 16:34.86 Gulshat Fazlitdinova Russia
6000m: 19:50.34 Gulshat Fazlitdinova Russia
7000m: 23:08.36 Gulshat Fazlitdinova Russia
8000m: 26:28.97 Gulshat Fazlitdinova Russia
9000m: 29:46.47 Gulshat Fazlitdinova Russia

== Participation ==
According to an unofficial count, 20 athletes from 15 countries participated in the event.

- Belarus (1)
- Czech Republic (1)
- France (1)
- Greece (1)
- Hungary (1)
- Italy (3)
- Norway (1)
- Portugal (1)
- Romania (2)
- Russia (1)
- Spain (1)
- Sweden (2)
- Turkey (2)
- Ukraine (1)
- United Kingdom (1)
