= Athletics at the 2019 Pan American Games – Men's 10,000 metres =

Men's 10,000 metres at the 2019 Pan American Games
- Venue: Athletics Stadium
- Dates: August 9
- Competitors: 11 from 9 nations
- Winning time: 28:27.47

Medalists
Gold medal	Ederson Pereira	Brazil
Silver medal	Reid Buchanan	United States
Bronze medal	Lawi Lalang	United States

The men's 10,000 metres competition of the athletics events at the 2019 Pan American Games took place on 9 August at the 2019 Pan American Games Athletics Stadium. The defending Pan American Games champion is Mohammed Ahmed from Canada.

== Records ==
Prior to this competition, the existing world and Pan American Games records were as follows:

World record	Kenenisa Bekele (ETH)	26:17.53	Brussels, Belgium	August 26, 2005
Pan American Games record	José David Galván (MEX)	28:08.74	Rio de Janeiro, Brazil	July 27, 2007

== Schedule ==
Date	Time	Round
August 9, 2019	16:40	Final

== Results ==
All times shown are in seconds.

KEY:	q	Fastest non-qualifiers	Q	Qualified	NR	National record	PB	Personal best	SB	Seasonal best	DQ	Disqualified

=== Final ===
The results were as follows:

Rank	Name	Nationality	Time	Notes
1st place, gold medalist(s)	Ederson Pereira	Brazil	28:27.47	PB
2nd place, silver medalist(s)	Reid Buchanan	United States	28:28.41	
3rd place, bronze medalist(s)	Lawi Lalang	United States	28:31.75	
4	Vidal Basco	Bolivia	28:34.37	PB
5	Jhon Cusi	Peru	28:35.41	PB
6	Rory Linkletter	Canada	28:38.49	
7	Iván Darío González	Colombia	28:39.15	SB
8	Jose Mauricio González	Colombia	28:48.00	SB
9	Saby Luna	Mexico	29:07.18	
10	Mario Pacay	Guatemala	29:30.83	
	Carlos Díaz	Chile	DNF	
	Juan Luis Barrios	Mexico	DNS	
