= Esselink =

Esselink is a surname. Notable people with the surname include:

- Bert Esselink (born 1999), Dutch footballer
- Elisabeth Esselink, better known under her stage name Solex (born 1965), Dutch musician
- Evan Esselink (born 1992), Canadian long-distance runner
