= Gakuru =

Gakuru is a Kenyan surname. Notable people with the surname include:

- David Gakuru (born 1997), Rwandan long-distance runner
- Wahome Gakuru (1966–2917), Kenyan politician
- Wamuyu Gakuru (1934–?), Kenyan freedom fighter
