= Reid Buchanan =

American long-distance runner

Personal information
- Born: February 3, 1993 (age 33)

Sport
- Country: United States
- Sport: Track and field
- Event: Long-distance running
Medal record
Representing United States
Pan American Games
Silver medal – second place	2019 Lima	10,000 m
NACAC Cross Country Championships
Bronze medal – third place	2019 Port of Spain	10,000 m

Reid Buchanan (born February 3, 1993) is an American long-distance runner. He won the silver medal in the men's 10,000 metres event at the 2019 Pan American Games held in Lima, Peru.

Buchanan competed for the Portland Pilots track and field team in the NCAA.

In 2019, he won the bronze medal in the senior 10,000 metres event at the 2019 NACAC Cross Country Championships held in Port of Spain, Trinidad and Tobago.
