= Courtice Secondary School =

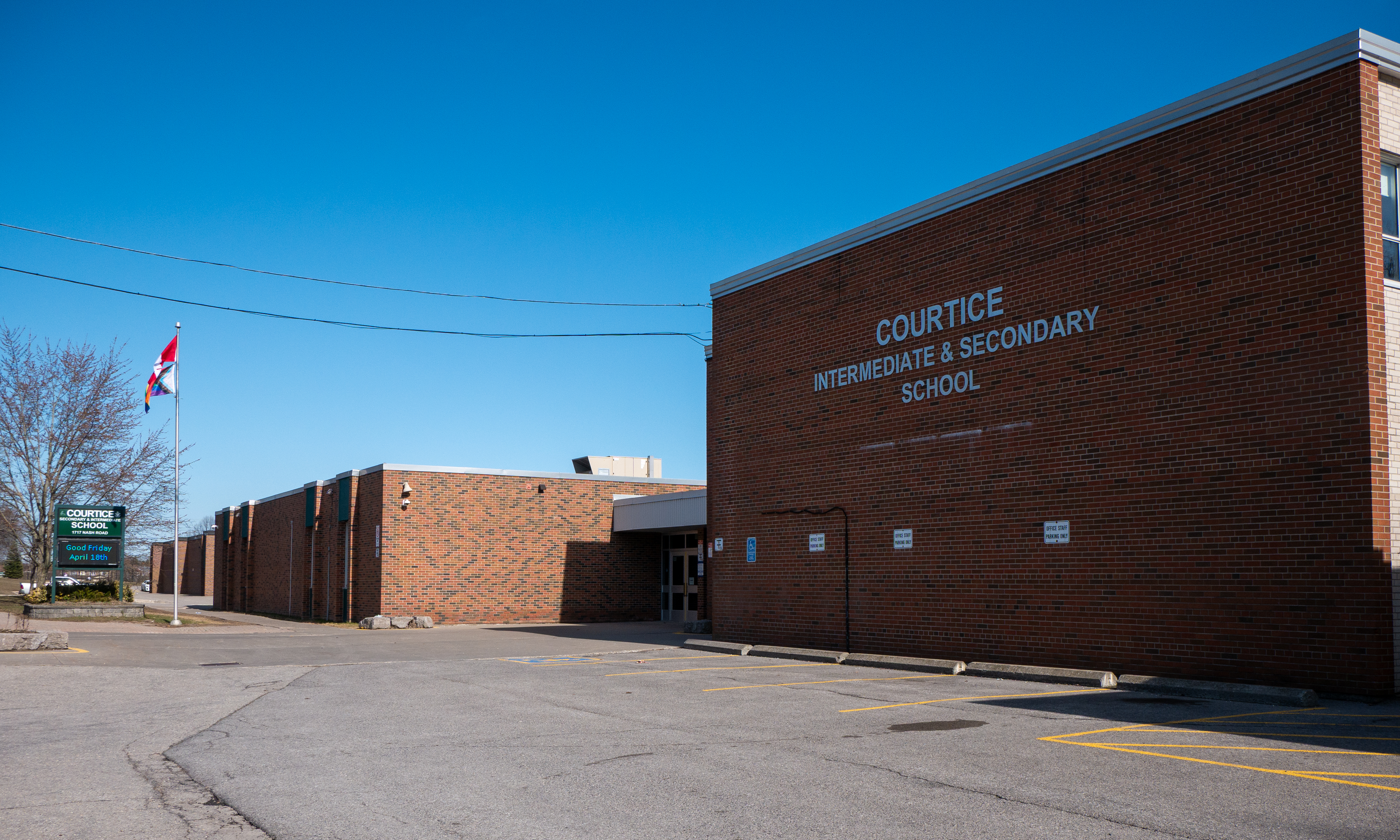
- Courtice Secondary in 2025

Location
- 1717 Nash Road; Clarington, Ontario, L1E 2L8; Canada; 43°54′55″N 78°46′56″W

Information
- School type: Public, high school and middle school
- Motto: Amor Sapientiae. Floreat
- Founded: September 1960; 66 years ago
- School board: Kawartha Pine Ridge District School Board
- Superintendent: Jamila Maliha
- School number: 903078
- Principal: Jeff Watt
- Grades: 7–12
- Enrollment: 815 (2019/2020)
- Language: English; French immersion
- Area: Courtice
- Colours: Green, Black, Gold
- Mascot: Gordon the Cougar
- Team name: Cougars
- Website: courticesecondary.kprdsb.ca

Courtice Secondary School is a public high school in the community of Courtice in Clarington, Ontario, Canada, at the corner of Nash and Courtice Roads.

== History ==
It was built in the late 1950s and opened in September 1960. The school has just under 1,000 students and is a part of the Kawartha Pine Ridge District School Board. It has five feeder schools: Courtice North P.S., Lydia Trull P.S., Courtice Intermediate School, Emily Stowe P.S., and S.T. Worden P.S. Courtice Intermediate School is located in the same building as Courtice Secondary. It opened in September 2013 as a response to overcrowding at Dr. G. J. MacGillivray. Grade 7 and 8 students from the Dr. G. J MacGillivray area are now directed to Courtice Intermediate.; the French Immersion program for grades 7 and 8 in the Courtice area has also been moved to Courtice Intermediate.

Beginning in the fall of 2014, Courtice Secondary became home to the French Immersion program for French Immersion students starting grade 9.

== Notable alumni ==
- Brad Beaumont, soccer player
- Allysha Chapman, Olympic soccer player, gold and bronze medal winner
- Evan Esselink, long-distance runner
- Lori Glazier, snowboarder at the 1998 Winter Olympics
- Zach Higgins, lacrosse player
- Derek Keenan, lacrosse player
- Matthew Morison, Olympic snowboarder
- Samantha Munro, actress

== School teams and clubs ==
- CSMSA (Courtice Secondary Muslim Student Association)
- Soccer (Boys and Girls)
- Volleyball (Boys and Girls)
- Basketball (Boys and Girls)
- Bowling (Boys and Girls)
- Varsity Boys Baseball
- Tennis (Boys and Girls)
- Hockey (Boys and Girls)
- Boys Lacrosse
- Track and Field
- Cross Country
- Curling (Boys and Girls)
- Rugby (Boys and Girls)
- Varsity Girls Softball
- Chess Club
- Girls Field Hockey
- School Reach
- Art Club
- Drama Club
- Film Club
- White Pine (started in 2009)
- Yearbook
- Concert, Jazz, Senior and Beginner Band
- AV Club
- Dungeons and Dragons
- Bible Club
- Girl Talk
- Eco-club
- AGSA (All Genders and Sexualities Accepted)

== See also ==
- Education in Ontario
- List of secondary schools in Ontario
