= Thabang Mosiako =

South African long-distance runner

Personal information
- Born: 23 February 1995 (age 30)

Sport
- Country: South Africa
- Sport: Long-distance running

Thabang Mosiako (born 23 February 1995) is a South African long-distance runner.

In 2017, he competed in the senior men's race at the 2017 IAAF World Cross Country Championships held in Kampala, Uganda. He finished in 47th place.

In 2019, he competed in the senior men's race at the 2019 IAAF World Cross Country Championships held in Aarhus, Denmark. He finished in 67th place.
