= Jiksa Tolosa =

Ethiopian long-distance runner

Personal information
- Born: 11 December 1998 (age 26)

Sport
- Country: Ethiopia
- Sport: Long-distance running

Jiksa Tolosa (born 11 December 1998) is an Ethiopian long-distance runner. In 2018, he competed in the men's half marathon at the 2018 IAAF World Half Marathon Championships held in Valencia, Spain. He finished in 23rd place.
