= Cristina Simion =

Romanian mountain runner

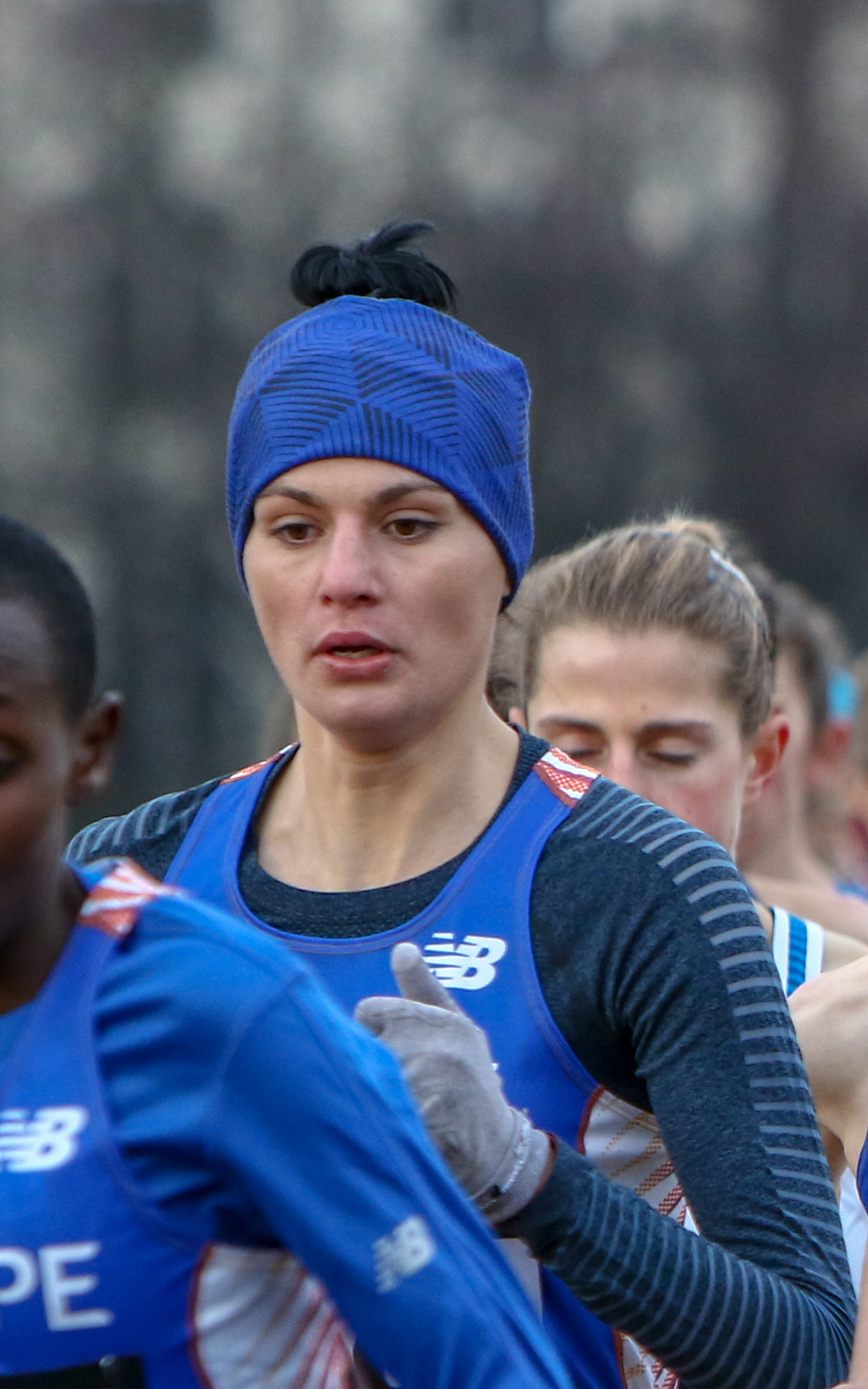

Personal information
- Full name: Cristina Negru Simion
- Nationality: Romanian
- Born: 20 November 1991 (age 34) Romania

Sport
- Country: Romania
- Sport: Sport of athletics; Mountain running
- Events: Long-distance running; Cross country running
- Club: CSA Steaua București

Achievements and titles
- Personal best: Half marathon: 1:15:15 (2018)
Medal record
Sport of athletics (senior)
Event	1st	2nd	3rd
European Cross Country Championships	0	1	1
European 10,000m Cup	0	1	0
Balkan Athletics Championships	1	0	0
Total	1	2	1

Cristina Simion (née Negru born 20 November 1991) is a Romanian female mountain runner, world champion at the World Long Distance Mountain Running Championships (2019).

== Biography ==
Simion in the sport of athletics at senior level was gold medal at the Balkan Athletics Championships (in 2017 in 5000 m) and bronze medal with the national team at the European Cross Country Championships (2016). Twice silver medal with the national team at the European Cross Country Championships (2017) and European 10,000m Cup (2018).

== Achievements ==
Year	Competition	Venue	Position	Event	Performance	Notes
Athletics
2013	European U23 Championships	(Finland) Tampere	19th	10,000 m	37:50.84	
2016	European Cross Country Championships	(Italy) Chia	27th	Individual	26:44	
2016	European Cross Country Championships	(Italy) Chia	3rd	Team	79 pts	
2017	Balkan Athletics Championships	(Serbia) Novi Pazar	1st	5000 m	16:36.98	
2017	European Cross Country Championships	(Slovakia) Šamorín	16th	Individual	27:58	
2017	European Cross Country Championships	(Slovakia) Šamorín	2nd	Team	31 pts	
2018	World Half Marathon Championships	(Spain) Valencia	68th	Half marathon	1:15:15	PB
2018	European 10,000m Cup	(United Kingdom) London	29th	10,000 m	33:20.97	PB
2018	European 10,000m Cup	(United Kingdom) London	2nd	Team	1:37:35.06	
2019	European 10,000m Cup	(United Kingdom) London	37th	10,000 m	33:41.02	SB
