= Rapula Diphoko =

Botswana long-distance runner

Personal information
- Born: 15 April 1989 (age 36)

Sport
- Country: Botswana
- Sport: Long-distance running

Rapula Diphoko (born 15 April 1989) is a long-distance runner from Botswana.

In 2012, he competed in the men's half marathon at the 2012 IAAF World Half Marathon Championships held in Kavarna, Bulgaria. He finished in 48th place.

In 2017, he competed in the senior men's race at the 2017 IAAF World Cross Country Championships held in Kampala, Uganda. He finished in 64th place.

In 2019, he competed in the senior men's race at the 2019 IAAF World Cross Country Championships held in Aarhus, Denmark. He finished in 75th place.
