= 2017 IAAF World Cross Country Championships – Senior men's race =

Senior men's race at the 2017 IAAF World Cross Country Championships
- Organisers: IAAF
- Edition: 42nd
- Date: March 26
- Host city: Kampala, Uganda
- Events: 1
- Distances: 10 km – Senior men (9.858 km)
- Participation: 146 athletes from 49 nations

The Senior men's race at the 2017 IAAF World Cross Country Championships was held at the Kampala in Uganda, on March 26, 2017.

The exact length of the course was 9,858 m (33m start, 4 full laps of 2,000 m and a final lap of 1,825m).

Complete results for individuals.

== Race results ==
=== Senior men's race (10 km) ===
==== Individual ====
Rank	Athlete	Country	Time
1st place, gold medalist(s)	Geoffrey Kipsang Kamworor	Kenya	28:24
2nd place, silver medalist(s)	Leonard Kiplimo Barsoton	Kenya	28:36
3rd place, bronze medalist(s)	Abadi Hadis	Ethiopia	28:43
4	Jemal Yimer	Ethiopia	28:46
5	Aron Kifle	Eritrea	28:49
6	Muktar Edris	Ethiopia	28:56
7	Vincent Kipsang Rono	Kenya	29:00
8	Ibrahim Jeilan	Ethiopia	29:07
9	Timothy Toroitich	Uganda	29:10
10	Bonsa Dida	Ethiopia	29:10
11	Sam Chelanga	United States	29:13
12	Leonard Patrick Komon	Kenya	29:16
13	Patrick Tiernan	Australia	29:19
14	Onesphore Nzikwinkunda	Burundi	29:21
15	Nicholas Mboroto Kosimbei	Kenya	29:23
16	Abdallah Kibet Mande	Uganda	29:25
17	Stephen Kiprotich	Uganda	29:27
18	Getaneh Molla	Ethiopia	29:34
19	Afewerki Berhane	Eritrea	29:35
20	Leonard Korir	United States	29:36
21	Shadrack Kipchirchir	United States	29:44
22	Gabriel Gerald Geay	Tanzania	29:47
23	Goitom Kifle	Eritrea	29:56
24	Jean-Marie Vianney Niyomukiza	Burundi	30:01
25	Aweke Ayalew	Bahrain	30:01
26	Stanley Kipkoech Kebenei	United States	30:03
27	Birhanu Balew	Bahrain	30:04
28	Mogos Shumay	Eritrea	30:06
29	Leonard Langat	Kenya	30:07
30	Joshua Kiprui Cheptegei	Uganda	30:08
31	Phillip Kipyeko	Uganda	30:11
32	Samsom Gebreyohannes	Eritrea	30:11
33	Hassan Chani	Bahrain	30:13
34	David Manja	South Africa	30:16
35	Berhane Amanuel	Eritrea	30:19
36	Scott Fauble	United States	30:20
37	Joel Mmone	South Africa	30:28
38	John Bazili Baynit	Tanzania	30:28
39	Rodrigue Kwizera	Burundi	30:28
40	Jack Rayner	Australia	30:30
41	Emanuel Giniki Gisamoda	Tanzania	30:32
42	Léonce Ndayikunda	Burundi	30:37
43	Adel Mechaal	Spain	30:40
44	Elroy Gelant	South Africa	30:45
45	Rabah Aboud	Algeria	30:48
46	Josephat Joshua Gisemo	Tanzania	30:48
47	Thabang Mosiako	South Africa	30:49
48	Fabiano Joseph	Tanzania	30:53
49	James Sugira	Rwanda	30:54
50	Sam McEntee	Australia	30:59
51	Sergio Sánchez	Spain	31:00
52	Stephen Kissa	Uganda	31:04
53	Stewart McSweyn	Australia	31:05
54	Olivier Irabaruta	Burundi	31:06
55	Alexis Nizeyimana	Rwanda	31:11
56	Kefasi Chitsala	Malawi	31:16
57	Lesiba Mashele	South Africa	31:17
58	Primien Manirafasha	Rwanda	31:19
59	Silvester Simon Naali	Tanzania	31:23
60	Wellington Varevi	Zimbabwe	31:24
61	Fernando Carro	Spain	31:24
62	David Gakuru	Rwanda	31:24
63	Liam Adams	Australia	31:27
64	Rapula Diphoko	Botswana	31:28
65	Yuma Higashi	Japan	31:31
66	José España	Spain	31:35
67	Walter Nina	Peru	31:36
68	Jean Marie Myasiro	Rwanda	31:37
69	José Luis Checco	Peru	31:37
70	Danmuzhenciwang	China	31:39
71	Trevor Hofbauer	Canada	31:43
72	Freddy Guimard	France	31:45
73	Kosei Yamaguchi	Japan	31:49
74	Chauncy Master	Malawi	31:49
75	Mijuenima	China	31:50
76	Rory Linkletter	Canada	31:54
77	Yach Wo	South Sudan	31:57
78	Ahmed Moharram	Egypt	31:59
79	Kondjashili Kefas	Namibia	32:01
80	Sami Jibril	Canada	32:02
81	Rene Champi	Peru	32:04
82	Grevazio Mpani	Malawi	32:05
83	David Kulang	South Sudan	32:07
84	Lional Don	Sri Lanka	32:10
85	Peter Glans	Denmark	32:13
86	Costern Chiyaba	Zambia	32:19
87	Duobujie	China	32:22
88	Evan Esselink	Canada	32:24
89	Andreas Schonberg Lommer	Denmark	32:25
90	Jesper Faurschou	Denmark	32:25
91	Abdelmunaim Yahya Adam	Sudan	32:28
92	Yamato Otsuka	Japan	32:28
93	Adam Haroon	Sudan	32:29
94	Ricardo Serrano	Spain	32:50
95	Thiery Ndikumwenayo	Burundi	32:55
96	Mohamed Daud Mohamed	Somalia	33:01
97	Ahmad Smour	Jordan	33:05
98	Christian Manga	Senegal	33:05
99	Fulgence Rakotondrasoa	Madagascar	33:06
100	Emmanuel Bakatukonka	DR Congo	32:09
101	Nicholas Falk	Canada	32:12
102	Mikkel Dahl-Jessen	Denmark	33:14
103	Emmanuel Roudolff-Lévisse	France	33:14
104	Zendio Daza	Peru	33:15
105	Abraham Guem	South Sudan	33:22
106	Mphoyamodino Kekganetswe	Botswana	33:26
107	Harry Sichaly	Malawi	33:26
108	Haruki Ono	Japan	33:31
109	Thomas Toth	Canada	33:41
110	Siragi Rubayita	Rwanda	33:54
111	Hamid Eysa Ibrahim	Sudan	34:00
112	Iven Moise	Seychelles	34:06
113	Daouda Korongou	Benin	34:07
114	Dikgakgamatso Modisagape	Botswana	34:07
115	Shota Maeda	Japan	34:07
116	Akech Ngor	South Sudan	34:11
117	Santino Kenyi	South Sudan	34:38
118	Hassan Ismail	Sudan	34:54
119	Sylvester Koko	Botswana	35:04
120	Husamatu Sanusi	Nigeria	35:13
121	Marko Akoon	South Sudan	35:23
122	Avikash La	Fiji	35:35
123	Ahmed Hawli	Sudan	35:39
124	Moussa Hudrog	Lebanon	35:39
125	Mohamadou Umarou	Cameroon	35:46
126	Wakidou Antoisse	Comoros	35:55
127	Nanribet Raymond	Nigeria	36:19
128	Alusine Gbao	Sierra Leone	36:27
129	Danjuma Stephen	Nigeria	36:40
130	Calvin Deyaguende	Central African Republic	36:46
131	Zile Soilihi	Comoros	37:00
132	Yanick Magnan	Seychelles	37:56
133	Awal Gochin	Nigeria	38:18
134	Mohammad Hashem	Kuwait	38:29
135	Hussain Kamal	Kuwait	38:55
136	Mehrubon Shamsidinov	Tajikistan	39:26
—	Omer Alfailakawi	Kuwait	DNF
—	Polat Kemboi Arikan	Turkey	DNF
—	Abraham Naibei Cheroben	Bahrain	DNF
—	Veli Dlamini	Eswatini	DNF
—	Jobo Khatoane	Lesotho	DNF
—	Isaac Kipruto Kimeli	Belgium	DNF
—	Albert Kibichii Rop	Bahrain	DNF
—	Jianyong Fang	Singapore	DNF
—	Trevor Dunbar	United States	DNS
—	Samuel Mpoyo Lukonda	DR Congo	DNS
—	Brett Robinson	Australia	DNS

==== Teams ====
Rank	Team	Points
1st place, gold medalist(s)	Ethiopia: Abadi Hadis / 3; Jemal Yimer / 4; Muktar Edris / 6; Ibrahim Jeilan / 8; (Bonsa Dida) / (10); (Getaneh Molla) / (18)	21
2nd place, silver medalist(s)	Kenya: Geoffrey Kipsang Kamworor / 1; Leonard Kiplimo Barsoton / 2; Vincent Kipsang Rono / 7; Leonard Patrick Komon / 12; (Nicholas Mboroto Kosimbei) / (15); (Leonard Langat) / (29)	22
3rd place, bronze medalist(s)	Uganda: Timothy Toroitich / 9; Abdallah Kibet Mande / 16; Stephen Kiprotich / 17; Joshua Kiprui Cheptegei / 30; (Phillip Kipyeko) / (31); (Stephen Kissa) / (52)	72
4	Eritrea: Aron Kifle / 5; Afewerki Berhane / 19; Goitom Kifle / 23; Mogos Shumay / 28; (Samsom Gebreyohannes) / (32); (Berhane Amanuel) / (35)	75
5	United States: Samuel Kiprono Chelanga / 11; Leonard Essau Korir / 20; Shadrack Kipchirchir / 21; Stanley Kipkoech Kebenei / 26; (Scott Fauble) / (36); (Trevor Dunbar) / (DNS)	78
6	Burundi: Onesphore Nzikwinkunda / 14; Jean-Marie Vianney Niyomukiza / 24; Rodrigue Kwizera / 39; Léonce Ndayikunda / 42; (Olivier Irabaruta) / (54); (Thiery Ndikumwenayo) / (95)	119
7	Tanzania: Gabriel Gerald Geay / 22; John Bazili Baynit / 38; Emanuel Giniki Gisamoda / 41; Josephat Joshua Gisemo / 46; (Fabiano Joseph) / (48); (Silvester Simon Naali) / (59)	147
8	Australia: Patrick Tiernan / 13; Jack Rayner / 40; Sam McEntee / 50; Stewart McSweyn / 53; (Liam Adams) / (63); (Brett Robinson) / (DNS)	
9	South Africa: David Manja / 34; Joel Mmone / 37; Elroy Gelant / 44; Thabang Mosiako / 47; (Lesiba Mashele) / (57)	162
10	Spain: Adel Mechaal / 43; Sergio Sánchez / 51; Fernando Carro / 61; José España / 66; (Ricardo Serrano) / (94)	221
11	Rwanda: James Sugira / 49; Alexis Nizeyimana / 55; Primien Manirafasha / 58; David Gakuru / 62; (Jean Marie Myasiro) / (68); (Siragi Rubayita) / (110)	224
12	Canada: Trevor Hofbauer / 71; Rory Linkletter / 76; Sami Jibril / 80; Evan Esselink / 88; (Nicholas Falk) / (101); (Thomas Toth) / (109)	315
13	Malawi: Kefasi Chitsala / 56; Chauncy Master / 74; Grevazio Mpani / 82; Harry Sichaly / 107	319
14	Peru: Walter Nina / 67; José Luis Checco / 69; Rene Champi / 81; Zendio Daza / 104	321
15	Japan: Yuma Higashi / 65; Kosei Yamaguchi / 73; Yamato Otsuka / 92; Haruki Ono / 108; (Shota Maeda) / (115)	338
16	Denmark: Peter Glans / 85; Andreas Schonberg Lommer / 89; Jesper Faurschou / 90; Mikkel Dahl-Jessen / 102	366
17	South Sudan: Yach Wol / 77; David Kulang / 83; Abraham Guem / 105; Akech Ngor / 116; (Santino Kenyi) / (117); (Marko Akoon) / (121)	381
18	Botswana: Rapula Diphoko / 64; Mphoyamodino Kekganetswe / 106; Dikgakgamatso Modisagape / 114; Sylvester Koko / 119	403
19	Sudan: Abdelmunaim Yahya Adam / 91; Adam Haroon / 93; Hamid Eysa Ibrahim / 111; Hassan Ismail / 118; (Ahmed Hawli) / (123)	413
20	Nigeria: Husamatu Sanusi / 120; Nanribet Raymond / 127; Danjuma Stephen / 129; Awal Gochin / 133	509

- Note: Athletes in parentheses did not score for the team result.

== See also ==
- 2017 IAAF World Cross Country Championships – Junior men's race
- 2017 IAAF World Cross Country Championships – Senior women's race
- 2017 IAAF World Cross Country Championships – Junior women's race
- 2017 IAAF World Cross Country Championships – Mixed relay
