= Pauline Kaveke Kamulu =

Kenyan long-distance runner

Medal record

Women's athletics

Representing Kenya

IAAF World Half Marathon Championships
Bronze medal – third place	2018 Valencia	Individual
Silver medal – second place	2018 Valencia	Team

Pauline Kaveke Kamulu (born 30 December 1994) is a Kenyan female long-distance runner who competes in track, road and cross country running disciplines. She was a medalist at the IAAF World Half Marathon Championships in 2018.

Raised in Machakos County, Kamulu won the Pune Half Marathon at the age of seventeen, setting a course record of 1:08:37 hours. Kamulu made her international debut as a junior at the World Cross Country Championships where she finished in eleventh place and was a non-point scorer on the winning Kenyan junior women's team. Following this she began to compete in Japan and ran with the Route Inn Hotels corporate running team. She won the 5000 metres at the Noboeka Golden Games in 2014 and was tenth over that distance at the All-Japan Corporate Track and Field Championships later that year. She ran at the 2014 and 2015 All-Japan Women's Corporate Ekiden Championships. She showed an aptitude for longer distances with third place at the 2015 Sanyo Women's Half Marathon. After a quiet 2016 she set a series of personal bests in 2017, including 1:08:04 hours for the half marathon, 8:48.27 in the 3000 metres, 14:58.82 in the 5000 m and 31:47.13 for the 10,000 metres. Her half marathon time came from a victory at the Sanyo race in Okayama and this was a new race record.

Kamulu began 2018 with a win at the All-Japan Corporate Half Marathon Championships. She earned her first senior national selection in that event, being part of the Kenyan women's team at the 2018 IAAF World Half Marathon Championships. Kamulu established herself among the world's top runners at that competition with a personal best of 1:06:56 hours bringing her a bronze medal and a team silver medal alongside teammates Joyciline Jepkosgei and Ruth Chepngetich.

== International competitions ==
Year	Competition	Venue	Position	Event	Notes
2013	World Cross Country Championships	Bydgoszcz, Poland	11th	Junior race	18:43
2018	World Half Marathon Championships	Valencia, Spain	3rd	Half marathon	1:06:56
2018	World Half Marathon Championships	Valencia, Spain	2nd	Team	3:23:02

== National titles ==
- All-Japan Corporate Half Marathon Championships: 2018
