= Vincent Kipsang Rono =

Kenyan long-distance runner

Medal record

Men's athletics

Representing Kenya

World Cross Country Championships
Silver medal – second place	2017 Kampala	Senior team

Vincent Kipsang Rono (born 22 December 1990) is a Kenyan male long-distance runner who competes in track, road running, and cross country running.

== Career ==
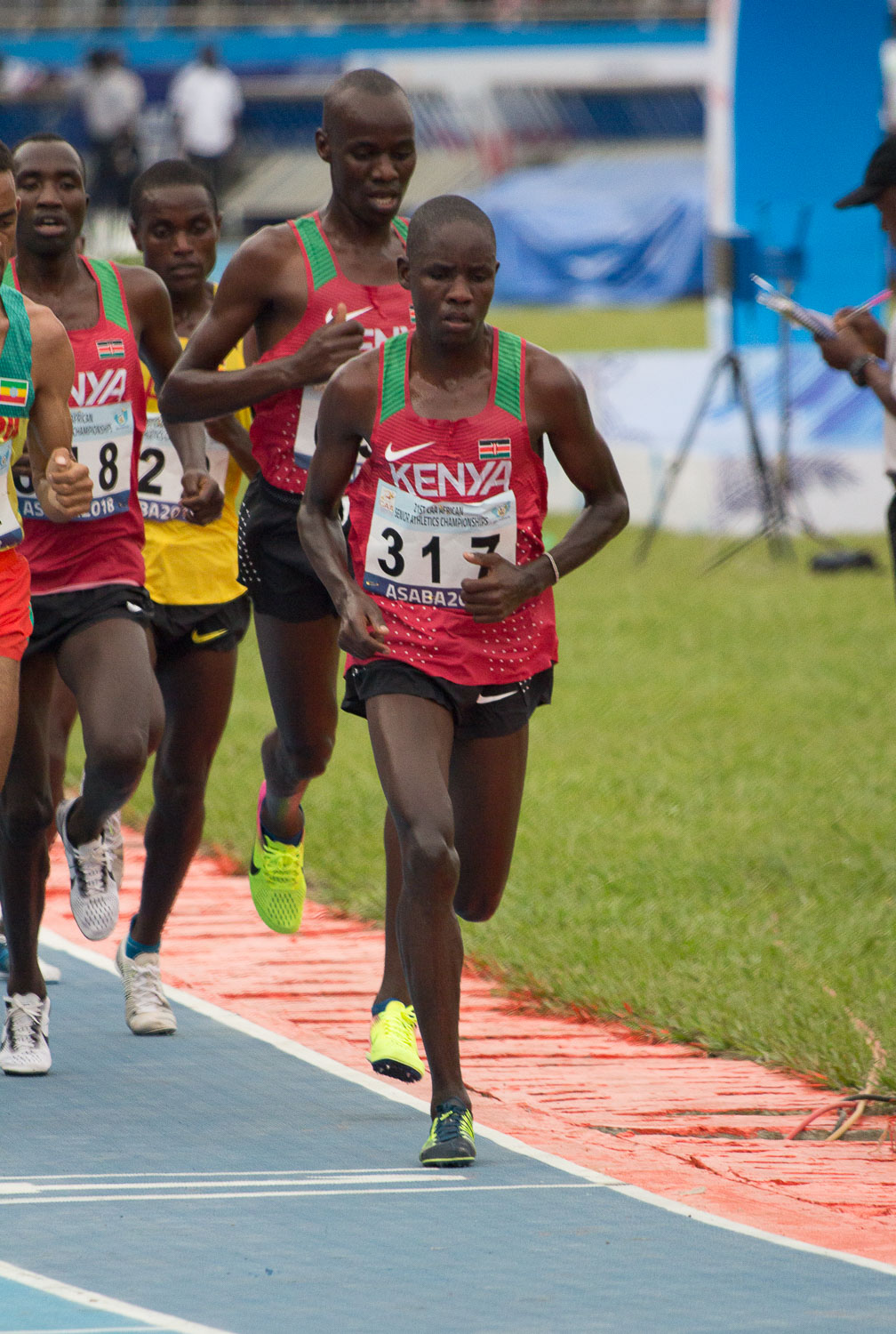
Vincent Kipsang Rono at the 2018 African Championships.

For most of his career during 2010 to 2016, he served as a pacemaker on the IAAF Diamond League and European track circuit. He won his first road race at the Le Lion Half Marathon in France in 2015. Rono acted as pacemaker at the Frankfurt Marathon in 2016. He begin to pick up his own racing career in earnest from the 2017 season onwards.

A fourth-place finish at the 2017 Kenyan Cross Country Championships led to his first international selection at age 26. He shared in the team silver medal at the 2017 IAAF World Cross Country Championships after finishing seventh. His debut over the marathon distance followed a month later and he claimed fourth at the Daegu Marathon in a time of 2:10:23 hours. Returning to Kenya, he won the Kenyan Police 10,000 metres race but despite a runner-up placing at the Kenyan Athletics Championships, he did not gain a spot on the Kenyan track team that year as he failed to finish at the trials race. He established himself as a strong road runner at the Lille Half Marathon, which he won in 59:27 minutes – his first clocking under an hour over the distance. In 2019, Rono finished 5th at the Rotterdam Marathon in a time of 2:07:10 hours.

In 2022, Rono won the Tel Aviv Marathon, with a time of 2:12:55.

== International competitions ==
Year	Competition	Venue	Position	Event	Notes
2017	World Cross Country Championships	Kampala, Uganda	7th	Senior race	29:00
2017	World Cross Country Championships	Kampala, Uganda	2nd	Senior team	22 pts

== Personal bests ==
- 800 metres – 1:48.58 min (2007)
- 1500 metres – 3:36.69 min (2008)
- Mile run – 3:59.63 min (2007)
- 3000 metres – 7:41.18 min (2010)
- 5000 metres – 13:16.42 min (2014)
- 10,000 metres – 27:52.19 min (2011)
- 10K run – 28:09 min (2015)
- Half marathon – 59:27 min (2017)
- Marathon – 2:07:10 (2019)
