= Valdas Dopolskas =

Lithuanian marathon runner (born 1992)

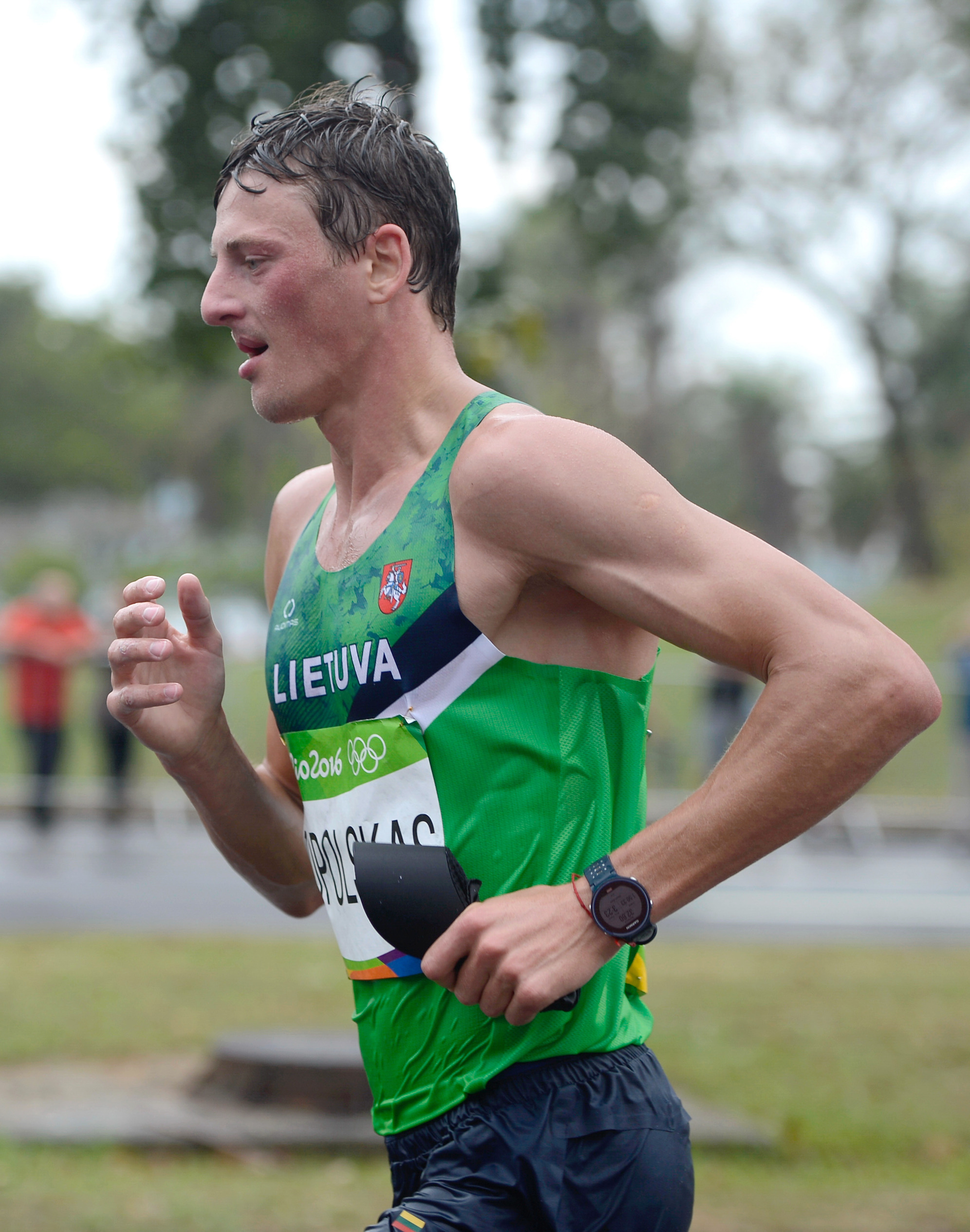
- Dopolskas at the 2016 Olympics

Personal information
- Born: April 30, 1992 (age 34)
- Height: 183 cm (6 ft 0 in)
- Weight: 69 kg (152 lb)

Sport
- Country: Lithuania
- Sport: Athletics
- Event: Marathon
- Club: Vilnius Baltai

Achievements and titles
- Personal best: 2:16:35 (2015)

Valdas Dopolskas (born 30 April 1992) is a Lithuanian marathon runner. In 2015 he broke his personal record and was selected to represent Lithuania at the 2016 Olympics. He speaks Lithuanian, English, Polish and Russian. In 2018, he competed in the men's half marathon at the 2018 IAAF World Half Marathon Championships held in Valencia, Spain. He finished in 104th place.
