= Cardiff Parkrun =

5k run in Bute Park, Cardiff, Wales

- Date: Every Saturday, 9 am
- Location: Cardiff
- Event type: Tarmac footpaths
- Distance: 5 kilometres (3.1 miles)
- Established: 16 February 2008; 18 years ago
- Course records: Jake Smith 14:15 (2022); Clara Evans 15:46 (2025)
- Website: www.parkrun.org.uk/cardiff/

Cardiff parkrun is a parkrun event that takes place every Saturday morning at 9 am in Cardiff, Wales. The parkrun was the first in Wales and has become the second largest in the UK. The run was started on 16 February 2008 and celebrated its 10th anniversary in 2018 with its largest ever attendance.

== The course ==
The course is an out-and-back run on the Taff trail along the River Taff, within Bute Park, and on tarmac footpaths. The event director set up nearby Grangemoor parkrun in 2015 and a third parkrun in Cardiff is planned to reduce congestion on the course.

== Suspension ==
The event was briefly suspended in 2011 by Cardiff Council for health and safety reasons. The suspension was criticised by Kevin Brennan, the local Member of Parliament, and the Wales Online portal remarked that there is a parkrun in war-torn Afghanistan. The suspension was lifted several days later without interruption to the event.

== Notable participants ==
- Charlotte Arter, Welsh athlete and women's parkrun world record holder
- Helen Jenkins, Welsh Olympian
- Iwan Thomas, Welsh Commonwealth champion
- Kelly Holmes, double Olympic Champion
