= Lawi Lalang =

Kenyan-American runner

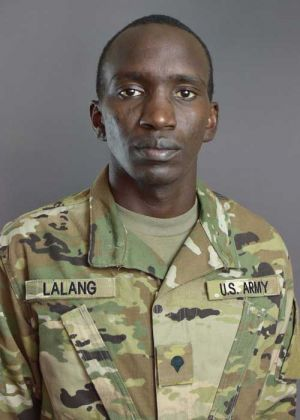

Personal information
- Nationality: Kenyan
- Born: June 15, 1991 (age 35) Eldoret, Kenya

Sport
- Sport: Long-distance running
- Event: 800 m – 10 km
- College team: University of Arizona
- Club: U.S. Army
Medal record
Pan American Games
Bronze medal – third place	2019 Lima	10,000 m

Lawi Lalang (born June 15, 1991) is a Kenyan-American runner.

== Personal life ==
His elder brother Boaz Kiplagat Lalang is a middle-distance runner, who specialises in the 5000 metres. Lalang was drafted into the U.S. Army World Class Athlete Program on a track to becoming a U.S. citizen. He switched athletic allegiance from Kenya to the US on May 17, 2018.

== Career ==
In college, Lalang ran for the University of Arizona. Lawi Lalang was coached by James Li of the University of Arizona, who also coaches other eminent Kenyan-American runners including Bernard Lagat. Lalang won 2011 NCAA Division I Cross Country Championships titles. In 2012, he won bronze at both the 2012 NCAA Division I Cross Country Championships and at the 2012 NCAA Division I Outdoor Track and Field Championships (5,000 m). In 2013 he won both 5,000 and 10,000 metres at the 2013 NCAA Division I Outdoor Track and Field Championships. In 2014 he took two silver medals at the 2014 NCAA Division I Indoor Track and Field Championships before finishing with a silver and a gold at the 2014 NCAA Division I Outdoor Track and Field Championships.

Representing the US in international competition, Lalang won the bronze medal in the 10,000 metres at the 2019 Pan American Games.

== Personal bests ==
- 800 metres – 1:48.88
- 1500 metres – 3:33.20
- Mile – 3:52.88
- 5000 metres – 13:00.95
- 10,000 metres – 28:14.63
