= Abbabiya Simbassa =

American runner

Biya Simbassa
Personal information
- Full name: Abbabiya Simbassa
- Born: June 30, 1993 (age 32)
- Home town: Asella, Ethiopia
- Education: Sioux City North High School
- Height: 6 ft 0 in (183 cm)

Sport
- Sport: Athletics
- Event: 1500 metres – marathon
- College team: Oklahoma Sooners
- Club: Asics

Achievements and titles
- Highest world ranking: 52 (5000m)
Medal record
Representing United States
NACAC Cross Country Championships
Gold medal – first place	2017 Boca Raton	10,000 m
Gold medal – first place	2019 Port of Spain	10,000 m

Abbabiya 'Biya' Simbassa (born June 30, 1993) is an Ethiopian-born American long-distance runner. He competed collegiately for the Oklahoma Sooners after spending two years at Iowa Central Community College. He now competes for Asics. He won the 2017 and 2019 NACAC Cross Country Championships. In 2021, he won the USA 10-mile run championships and 25K championships.

== Personal bests ==
Outdoor

- 1500 metres – 3:39.88 (Portland 2021)
- Mile – 3:58.71 (Raleigh 2021)
- 3000 metres – 7:48.55 (Phoenix 2021)
- 5000 metres – 13:19.12 (San Juan Capistrano 2021)
- 10,000 metres – 27:45.78 (Palo Alto 2017)

Road

- 5K – 13:40 (Boston 2025)
- 10K – 27:32 (Tokyo 2025)
- 15K – 43:22 (Jacksonville 2022)
- 10 miles – 45:23 (Washington, D.C. 2025)
- 20K – 58:29 (New Haven 2024)
- Half marathon – 1:00:37 (Valencia 2022)
- 25K – 1:14:27 (Grand Rapids 2021)
- Marathon – 2:06:53 (Valencia 2024)

Indoor

- Mile – 4:06.38 (College Station 2014)
- 3000 metres – 8:04.44 (Fayetteville 2015)
- 5000 metres – 13:46.97 (Boston 2019)
