= Sami Jibril =

Canadian long-distance runner

Personal information
- Born: 8 November 1989 (age 35)

Sport
- Country: Canada
- Sport: Long-distance running

Sami Jibril (born 8 November 1989) is a Canadian long-distance runner.

In 2017, he competed in the senior men's race at the 2017 IAAF World Cross Country Championships held in Kampala, Uganda. He finished in 80th place.

In 2018, he competed in the men's half marathon at the 2018 IAAF World Half Marathon Championships held in Valencia, Spain. He finished in 110th place.
