= Kinsey Middleton =

Canadian long-distance runner

Personal information
- Nationality: Canadian
- Born: Kinsey Gomez; November 22, 1992 (age 33) Coeur d'Alene, Idaho, U.S.
- Height: 5 ft 6 in (1.68 m)

Sport
- Country: Canada
- Sport: Track & Field, Distance Running, Road racing
- Event(s): 5000 meters, 10,000 meters, Half marathon, Marathon
- College team: Oregon State University '14; University of Idaho '16
- Turned pro: 2016
- Coached by: Travis Floeck

Achievements and titles
- Personal best(s): 1500m: 4:15.19 (2017); 3000m: 9:06.94 (2017); 5000m: 15:52.79 (2017); 10,000 metres: 32:30.81 (2018); 10 km road: 33:20 (2017); Half marathon: 1:11:48 (2020); Marathon: 2:30:08 (2022)
Medal record
Women's athletics
Representing Canada
World Championships
2022 Eugene	Marathon
World Half Marathon Championships
2018 Valencia	Half Marathon

Kinsey Middleton (born November 22, 1992) is a Canadian long-distance runner who competes in road running and cross country running and track & field competitions. Middleton won 2018 Canadian National Marathon Championship 21 October 2018 at Toronto Waterfront Marathon in a time of 2:32:09. Middleton represented Canada at 2018 IAAF World Half Marathon Championships placing 50th in 1:13:52.

== Professional ==
Kinsey Middleton finished as the top Canadian woman, stopping the clock in 2:32:09 in her Toronto Waterfront debut. Middleton paced the first half of the Toronto Waterfront Marathon in 1:15:48. Middleton placed 18th in January 2018 at the Houston Half Marathon in 1:12:30. In May 2018, Middleton ran 33:48 in a road 10k at 2018 Ottawa 10K. January 2020, she ran a personal best of 1:11:48 at the Houston Half Marathon. She was slated to compete in the spring 2020 London Marathon, until it was canceled.

Middleton, won the 2022 Ottawa Marathon on May 29, running a personal best of 2:30:08 in warm conditions. She was the first Canadian woman to win the race in 15 years.

Middleton represented Athletics Canada at the 2022 World Marathon Championships in Eugene, OR on July 18 where she placed 26th in 2:32:56 2022 World Athletics Championships – Women's marathon.

== NCAA ==
Kinsey Gomez competed for Oregon State University '14 and the University of Idaho '16. Gomez followed her college coach Travis Floeck from the Oregon State Beavers to the Idaho Vandals, where she met her husband. She was a Big Sky Conference Champion in the 5000m and an NCAA All-American and school record holder in the 10,000m running 33:18.

== Prep ==
Kinsey Middleton, formerly Gomez, placed second in the 1500 meters in 4:38.71 at 2010 USATF National Junior Olympic Track & Field Championships at California State University, Sacramento the summer before graduating from Coeur d'Alene High School in Idaho in 2011.

Gomez won the 3200 meters in 10:56.97 and 1600 meters in 5:03.73 May 19 at the 2011 Idaho High School Activities Association 5A State Track and Field Championships at Boise State University.

Gomez set Coeur d'Alene High School records in 1600 m (5:00.15) and 3200 m (10:55.14).

Gomez won 2009 Idaho High School Activities Association 5A State Cross Country championship in 18:09 at Circling Raven Golf Club and 2010 Idaho High School Activities Association 5A State Cross Country championship in 19:02 at Soda Springs's Kelly Park Nordic Ski Trails.

== Personal life ==
Middleton's mother is from Canada and father is from the United States. At birth, Kinsey's grandmother applied for dual citizenship for Kinsey and Middleton chose to compete for Canada after graduating from University. Middleton's provincial alliance is British Columbia (closest to her Idaho home). Middleton started running in kindergarten, but she also played soccer until Grade 8. Her family is originally from Guelph, Ontario.
