= Abadi Hadis =

Ethiopian long-distance runner (1997–2020)

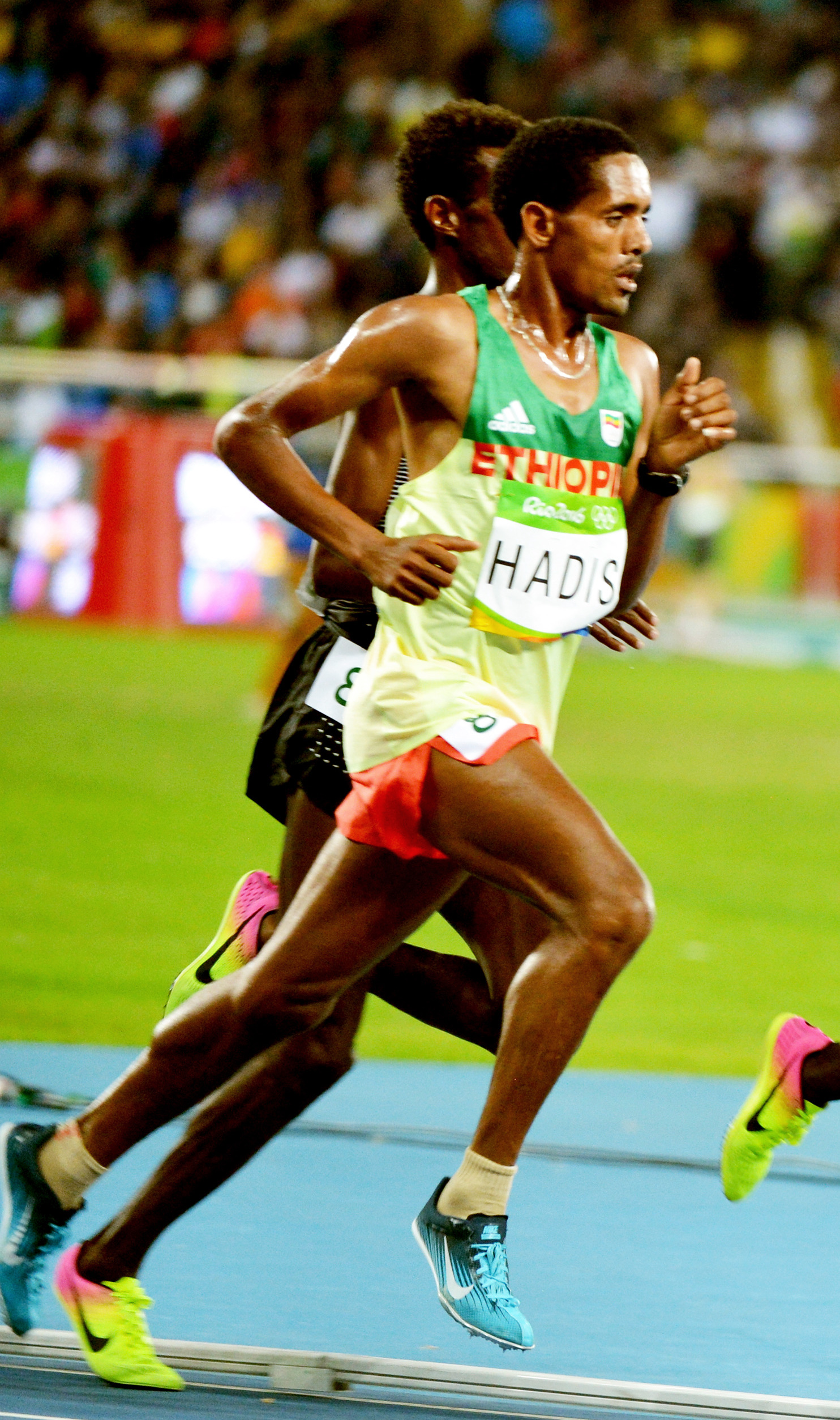
- Hadis at the 2016 Olympics

Personal information
- Nationality: Ethiopian
- Born: 6 November 1997
- Died: 4 February 2020 (aged 22) Mekelle, Ethiopia
- Height: 170 cm (5 ft 7 in)
- Weight: 63 kg (139 lb)

Sport
- Sport: Athletics
- Event: 3000m - half marathon

Achievements and titles
- Personal bests: 3000 m – 7:39.10 (2015); 5000 m – 12:56.27 (2018); 10,000 m – 26:56.46 (2019); Half marathon – 58:44 (2018)
Medal record
Representing Ethiopia
Men's cross country running
World Championships
Bronze medal – third place	2017 Kampala	Senior men's race (10 km)

Abadi Hadis (6 November 1997 – 4 February 2020) was an Ethiopian long-distance runner. He placed 15th over 10,000 metres at the 2016 Olympics.

He won a bronze medal at the 2017 IAAF World Cross Country Championships. He is one of just five men in history to have bettered 13 minutes for 5000m, 27 minutes for 10,000m and 59 minutes for the half marathon.

Hadis died in February 2020 at the age of 22 while being treated in a hospital for an unspecified illness.
