= Andrey Leymenov =

Kazakhstani long-distance runner

Personal information
- Born: 14 June 1986 (age 39)

Sport
- Country: Kazakhstan
- Sport: Long-distance running

Andrey Leymenov (born 14 June 1986) is a Kazakhstani long-distance runner.

In 2018, he competed in the men's half marathon at the 2018 IAAF World Half Marathon Championships held in Valencia, Spain. He finished in 125th place.
