= Amir Baitukanov =

Kazakhstani long-distance runner

Personal information
- Born: 29 October 1989 (age 35)

Sport
- Country: Kazakhstan
- Sport: Long-distance running

Amir Baitukanov (born 29 October 1989) is a Kazakhstani long-distance runner.

In 2018, he competed in the men's half marathon at the 2018 IAAF World Half Marathon Championships held in Valencia, Spain. He finished in 133rd place.
