= Emanuel Giniki Gisamoda =

Tanzanian long-distance runner

Personal information
- Born: 18 May 1988 (age 37)

Sport
- Country: Tanzania
- Sport: Long-distance running

Emanuel Giniki Gisamoda (born 18 May 1988) is a Tanzanian long-distance runner.

In 2017, he competed in the senior men's race at the 2017 IAAF World Cross Country Championships held in Kampala, Uganda. He finished in 41st place.

In 2019, he competed in the senior men's race at the 2019 IAAF World Cross Country Championships held in Aarhus, Denmark. He finished in 109th place.
