= Primien Manirafasha =

Rwandan long-distance runner

Personal information
- Born: 4 November 1989 (age 35)

Sport
- Country: Rwanda
- Sport: Long-distance running

Primien Manirafasha (born 4 November 1989) is a Rwandan long-distance runner.

In 2017, he competed in the senior men's race at the 2017 IAAF World Cross Country Championships held in Kampala, Uganda. He finished in 58th place.
