= Peter Glans =

Danish long-distance runner

Personal information
- Born: 5 January 1993 (age 33)

Sport
- Country: Denmark
- Sport: Long-distance running

Peter Glans (born 5 January 1993) is a Danish long-distance runner.

In 2017, he competed in the senior men's race at the 2017 IAAF World Cross Country Championships held in Kampala, Uganda. He finished in 85th place.

In 2019, he competed in the senior men's race at the 2019 IAAF World Cross Country Championships held in Aarhus, Denmark. He finished in 94th place.
