= 2019 NACAC Cross Country Championships =

- Organisers: NACAC
- Edition: 16th
- Date: February 16
- Host city: Port of Spain, Trinidad, Trinidad and Tobago
- Venue: Queen's Park Savannah
- Events: 4
- Distances: 10 km – Senior men 8 km – Junior men (U20); 10 km – Senior women 6 km – Junior women (U20)
- Participation: 99 athletes from 8 nations

The 2019 NACAC Cross Country Championships took place on February 16, 2019. The races were held at the Queen's Park Savannah in Port-of-Spain, Trinidad and Tobago. A detailed report of the event was given for the IAAF.

== Medallists ==
Event	Gold		Silver		Bronze	
Individual
Senior men (10 km)	Abbabiya Simbassa; United States	31:49	Frankline Tonui; United States	31:50	Reid Buchanan; United States	31:51
Junior (U20) men (8 km)	Evan Burke; Canada	27:20	Nicholas Mota; Canada	27:30	Andrew Davies; Canada	27:37
Senior women (10 km)	Breanna Sieracki; United States	36:34	Jessica O'Connell; Canada	36:37	Jessica Tonn; United States	36:40
Junior (U20) women (6 km)	Taryn O'Neill; Canada	22:08	Charlotte Wood; Canada	22:10	Makenna Fitzgerald; Canada	22:14
Team
Senior women	United States	18	Canada	20	Mexico	55
Senior men	United States	10	Canada	31	Trinidad and Tobago	88
Junior (U20) women	Canada	10	United States	33	Puerto Rico	58
Junior (U20) men	Canada	12	United States	30	Puerto Rico	41

== Race results ==
=== Senior Women's race (10 km) ===
Individual race
Rank	Athlete	Country	Time
1st place, gold medalist(s)	Breanna Sieracki	United States	36:34
2nd place, silver medalist(s)	Jessica O'Connell	Canada	36:37
3rd place, bronze medalist(s)	Jessica Tonn	United States	36:40
4	Natasha Wodak	Canada	36:50
5	Genevieve Lalonde	Canada	36:51
6	Grayson Murphy	United States	36:58
7	Brenda Flores	Mexico	37:01
8	Hannah Everson	United States	37:03
9	Katelyn Ayers	Canada	37:16
10	Samantha Bluske	United States	37:40
11	Katrina Spratford	United States	37:44
12	Tonya Nero	Trinidad and Tobago	38:11
13	Claire Sumner	Canada	38:16
14	Maria De Jesus Ruiz	Mexico	39:05
15	Cindy Meza	Mexico	39:29
16	Natalia Hawthorn	Canada	39:47
17	Ashley Laureano Rosado	Puerto Rico	40:06
18	Samantha Shukla	Trinidad and Tobago	41:17
19	Faviola Sarai Perez	Mexico	41:23
20	Idelma Lizeth Delgado	El Salvador	42:57
21	Monica Vargas Chaves	Costa Rica	45:10

=== Senior Men's race (10 km) ===
Individual race
Rank	Athlete	Country	Time
1st place, gold medalist(s)	Abbabiya Simbassa	United States	31:49
2nd place, silver medalist(s)	Frankline Tonui	United States	31:50
3rd place, bronze medalist(s)	Reid Buchanan	United States	31:51
4	Evans Kirwa	United States	32:08
5	Rory Linkletter	Canada	32:13
6	David Elliott	United States	32:17
7	Mike Tate	Canada	32:29
8	Joel Reichow	United States	32:32
9	Evan Esselink	Canada	32:40
10	Benjamin Preisner	Canada	32:48
11	Emmanuel Nava	Mexico	32:59
12	Ehab El-Sandali	Canada	33:06
13	Abraham Hernandez	Mexico	33:38
14	Jose Aurelio Sanchez	Mexico	33:50
15	Oscar Antonio Aldana	El Salvador	34:23
16	Alexander Torres Rojas	Puerto Rico	34:52
17	Oshane Archibald	Jamaica	34:56
17	Dwayne Graham	Jamaica	34:56
19	Juan Ram Fallas Navarro	Costa Rica	35:13
20	Matthew Hagley	Trinidad and Tobago	35:22
21	Sherwyn Stapleton	Trinidad and Tobago	35:32
22	Luis Alejandro Castro Coto	Costa Rica	35:38
23	Iley Bruce	Trinidad and Tobago	35:53
24	Shirvan Baboolal	Trinidad and Tobago	36:08
25	Anthony Phillip	Trinidad and Tobago	37:18
26	Mark London	Trinidad and Tobago	38:28
DNF	Garfield Gordon	Jamaica	DNF

=== Junior (U20) women's race (6 km) ===
Teams
Rank	Team	Points
1st place, gold medalist(s)	Canada: Taryn O'Neill / 1; Charlotte Wood / 2; Makenna Fitzgerald / 3; Anne Forsyth / 4	10
2nd place, silver medalist(s)	United States: Samantha Corman / 6; Heidi Nielson / 8; Noelle Adriaens / 9; Grace Ping / 10	33
3rd place, bronze medalist(s)	Puerto Rico: Isamari Arroyo Umpierre / 12; Fabianna Szorenyi Elias / 14; Alysa Alejandro Soto / 15; Jorelis Vargas Marinez / 17	58

== Medal table (unofficial) ==
* Host nation (Trinidad and Tobago)

Rank	Nation	Gold	Silver	Bronze	Total
1	Canada	4	5	2	11
2	United States	4	3	2	9
3	Puerto Rico	0	0	2	2
4	Mexico	0	0	1	1
4	Trinidad and Tobago*	0	0	1	1
6	Jamaica	0	0	0	0
Totals (6 entries)		8	8	8	24

- Note: Totals include both individual and team medals, with medals in the team competition counting as one medal.

== Participation ==
According to an unofficial count, 99 athletes from 8 countries participated.

- Bahamas (4)
- Canada (22)
- Costa Rica (4)
- Jamaica (10)
- Mexico (14)
- Puerto Rico (14)
- Trinidad and Tobago (8)
- United States (23)

== See also ==
- 2019 in athletics (track and field)
