= Luke Traynor =

British long-distance runner

Personal information
- Born: 6 July 1993 (age 32) Glasgow

Sport
- Country: United Kingdom
- Sport: Long-distance running
- College team: Tulsa Golden Hurricane

Luke Traynor (born 6 July 1993) is a British former long-distance runner.

In 2018, he competed in the men's half marathon at the 2018 IAAF World Half Marathon Championships held in Valencia, Spain. He finished in 38th place. In the same year, he also competed at the 2018 European 10,000m Cup.

In 2019, he competed in the senior men's race at the 2019 IAAF World Cross Country Championships held in Aarhus, Denmark. He finished in 107th place.

In June 2020, Traynor was issued with a two-year ban backdated to May 2019 for an anti-doping rule violation after testing positive for cocaine.
