= Brad Beaumont =

Canadian soccer player

Personal information
- Full name: Bradley James Beaumont
- Date of birth: March 24, 1992 (age 34)
- Place of birth: Scarborough, Ontario, Canada
- Height: 1.88 m (6 ft 2 in)
- Positions: Centre-back; defensive midfielder

Youth career
- Ajax Rapids
- 2006–2010: Courtice Cougars

College career
Years	Team	Apps	(Gls)
2010–2014	St. Bonaventure Bonnies		

Senior career*
Years	Team	Apps	(Gls)
2015	W Connection F.C.		
- * Club domestic league appearances and goals

Bradley James Beaumont (born March 24, 1992) is a Canadian former soccer player who played as a centre-back and defensive midfielder.

== Early life ==
Born in Scarborough, Ontario, Beaumont lived in Pickering, Ontario until age four, moving to Courtice and attending Courtice Secondary School for four years. While playing for the school, Beaumont won the 2008–09 LOSSA Championship going on to compete in OFSAA. As a child, Beaumont practiced a range of sports, such as hockey and basketball to develop necessitous life skills such as communication. His high school allowed an 'exceptional player clause' for Beaumont due to his talent, promoting him from their junior to senior team.

== Career ==
=== College career ===
Beaumont enrolled at St. Bonaventure University in 2010 where he played for the St. Bonaventure Bonnies in the Atlantic 10 Conference under head coach Mel Mahler. In the 2013 season, he recorded an overall ten points for the team. He graduated from the school in 2014 with a sociology degree. In total, Beaumont scored seven goals and recorded eighteen points with the Bonnies.

=== Club career ===
After graduating, Beaumont got in touch with Trinidadian coach Leslie Fitzpatrick who helped train him and spread his information to clubs in Trinidad and Tobago. Finally, in February 2015, he was signed with fellow Canadian Maleik de Freitas by W Connection F.C. in what Fitzpatrick described as a 'mutually benefiting' transfer with the contract ending by the conclusion of the season. Participating in the 2015 Trinidad and Tobago FA Trophy final, losing 5–4 on penalties, the centre-back stated that the match was the highlight of his career because of the crowd and intensity. He took part in the 2015 CFU Club Championship with his team as well.

== Style of play ==
Described as an intelligent defender, the Canadian was known for his strength in the air and being able to operate in midfield.
