= Sam McEntee =

Australian long-distance runner

Personal information
- Nationality: Australian
- Born: 3 February 1992 (age 34)

Sport
- Country: Australia
- Sport: Track and field athletics
- Event: Long-distance running
- College team: Villanova
- Coached by: Elizabeth Mathews

Sam McEntee (born 3 February 1992) is an Australian long-distance runner. He competed at the 2016 Summer Olympics in Rio de Janeiro, in the men's 5000 metres. In 2017, he competed in the senior men's race at the 2017 IAAF World Cross Country Championships held in Kampala, Uganda. He finished in 50th place.
