= Maamar Bengriba =

Algerian long-distance runner

Personal information
- Born: 26 October 1985 (age 39)

Sport
- Country: Algeria
- Sport: Long-distance running

Maamar Bengriba (born 26 October 1985) is an Algerian long-distance runner.

In 2018, he competed in the men's half marathon at the 2018 IAAF World Half Marathon Championships held in Valencia, Spain. He finished in 74th place. He also competed in the men's half marathon at the 2018 Mediterranean Games held in Tarragona, Spain. He finished in 13th place.
