= David Gakuru =

Rwandan long-distance runner (born 1997)

Personal information
- Born: 1997 (age 27–28)

Sport
- Country: Rwanda
- Sport: Long-distance running

David Gakuru (born 1997) is a Rwandan long-distance runner.

In 2017, he competed in the senior men's race at the 2017 IAAF World Cross Country Championships held in Kampala, Uganda. He finished in 62nd place.

In 2018, he competed in the men's half marathon at the 2018 IAAF World Half Marathon Championships held in Valencia, Spain. He finished in 109th place.
