= Rory Linkletter =

Canadian long-distance runner (born 1996

Rory Linkletter OLY
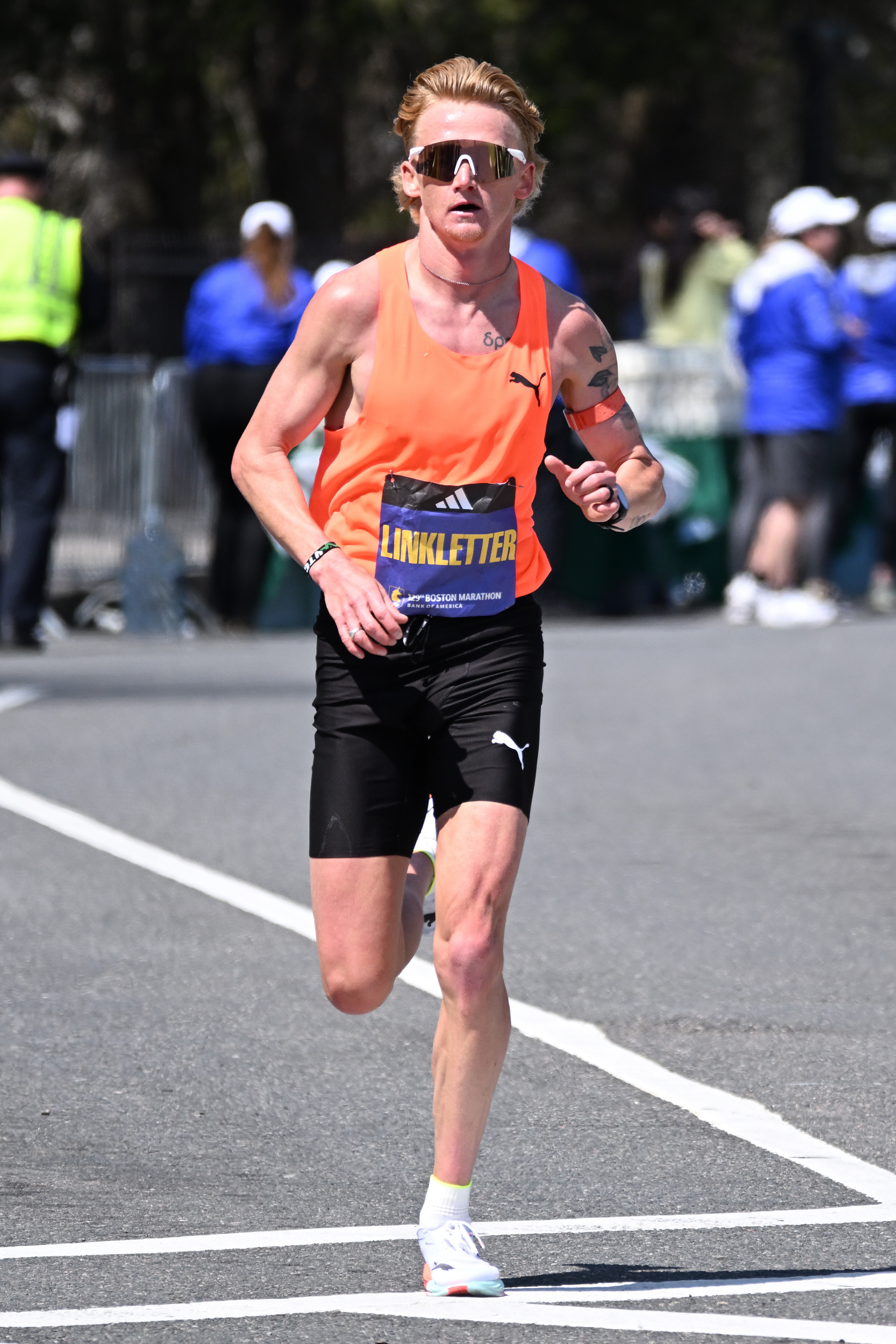
- Linkletter competing at the 2025 Boston Marathon

Personal information
- Citizenship: Canada; United States
- Born: August 12, 1996 (age 30) Calgary, Alberta, Canada
- Education: Brigham Young University
- Height: 5 ft 11 in (180 cm)

Sport
- Country: Canada
- Sport: Long-distance running
- Events: Marathon, 10,000 metres
- University team: BYU Cougars
- Team: Puma (2022–Present); Hoka NAZ Elite (2019-2021)
- Turned pro: 2019
- Coached by: Jon Green (2024-present); Ryan Hall (2022-2024); Ben Rosario (2019-2021); Ed Eyestone (2014-2019)

Achievements and titles
- Personal bests: 10,000 metres: 27:48.23 (San Juan Capistrano 2025); Half marathon: 59:49 (Houston 2026); Marathon: 2:06:04 (Boston 2026)

Rory Linkletter (born August 12, 1996) is a Canadian long-distance runner. He represented Canada in the marathon at the 2022 and 2023 World Championships. He holds a personal best of 2:06:04 set at the 2026 Boston Marathon making him the second fastest Canadian of all time over the distance. He currently holds the Canadian half marathon record of 59:49 set at the 2026 Houston Half Marathon.

== Early and personal life ==
Born in Calgary, Alberta, Linkletter moved to Herriman, Utah at the age of 5.

While a freshman at Herriman High School, he was introduced to running after his friend brought him to a summer practice. After graduating high school, he enrolled at Brigham Young University where he would compete for the Cougars track and field and cross country teams.

At BYU, he met fellow BYU athlete Jill van Dielo, who competed for the Cougars gymnastics team. They married in 2019 and as of 2024, have two children.

Linkletter lives and trains in Flagstaff, Arizona.

== Collegiate career (2015–2019) ==
=== 2015 ===
During his freshman year at BYU, Linkletter was selected to compete for Canada at the 2015 IAAF World Cross Country Championships in Guiyang, China. He would go on to place 84th in the junior men's race.

=== 2016 ===
In 2016, his first full track season for BYU, he qualified for the outdoor NCAA Championships at Hayward Field where he would go on to place 19th in the 5000 m.

The following cross-country season, he placed 32nd at cross country nationals in Terre Haute as the 2nd finisher on the 7th place Cougars team.

=== 2017 ===
In March 2017, he competed in the senior men's race at the 2017 IAAF World Cross Country Championships held in Kampala, Uganda. He finished in 76th place.

Linkletter would run a 5000 m personal best of 13:49.00 to qualify for 2017 indoor nationals before going on to place 11th at the national meet College Station.

Outdoors, he finished as the runner up over 10,000 m at nationals, just 1.42 seconds behind first-place finisher Marc Scott.

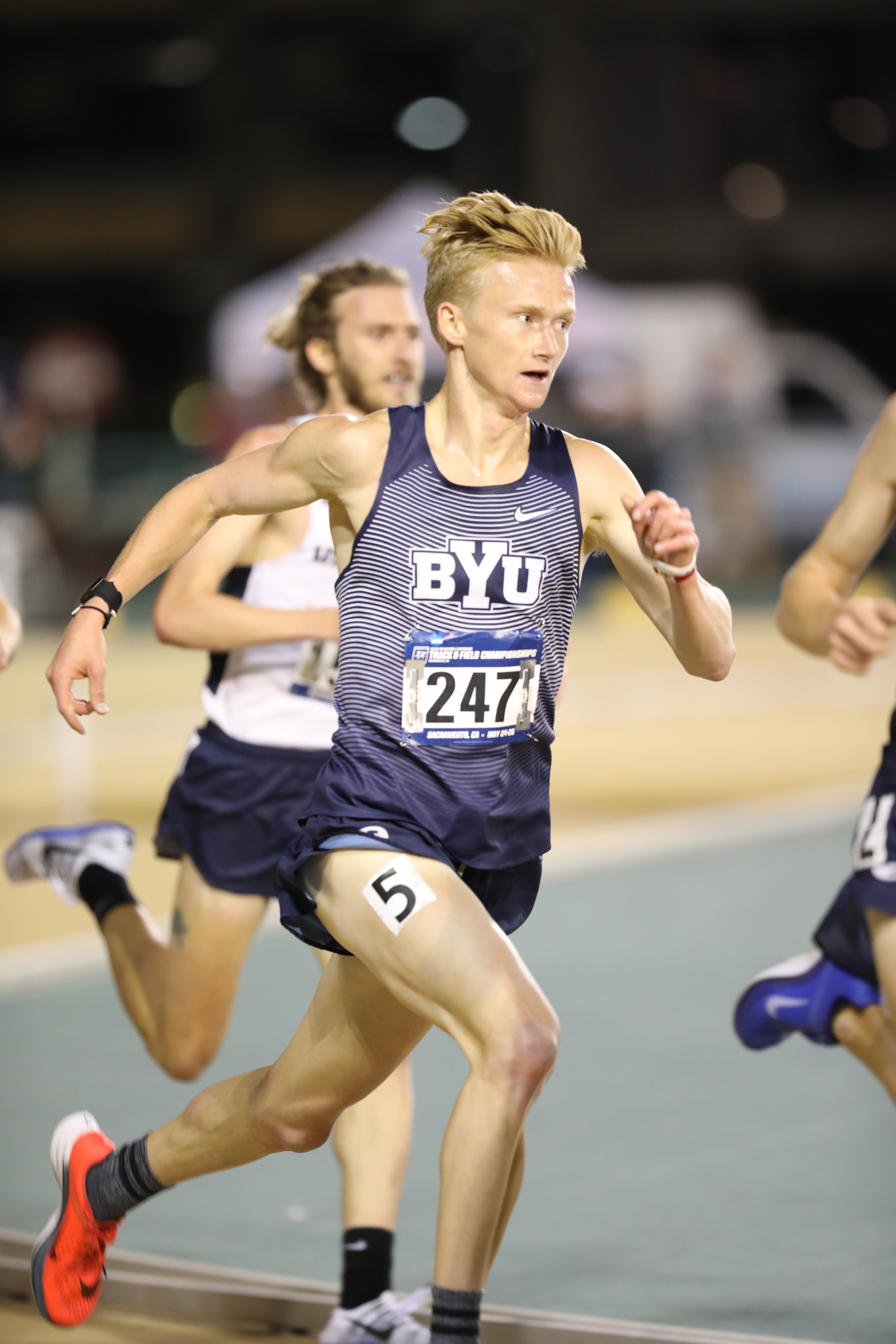
Linkletter in 2018.

=== 2018 ===
At the 2018 NCAA Indoor Championships in College Station, Texas, he contested the 5000 m, placing eighth. At the NCAA Outdoor Championships, he doubled in the 5000 m and 10,000 m. After a poor showing in the 10,000 m, placing 24th, Rory rebounded in the 5000 m, placing eighth.

=== 2019 ===
In 2019, he finished in 5th place in the senior event at the 2019 NACAC Cross Country Championships held in Port of Spain, Trinidad and Tobago. A few weeks later, he competed in the at the 2019 IAAF World Cross Country Championships held in Aarhus, Denmark. He finished in 82nd place.

During the 2019 outdoor track season, his final year competing for BYU, he ran personal bests of 13:36.41 over 5000 m in April and 28:12.42 over 10,000 m in May. At the NCAA Championships, he chose to solely contest the 10,000 m, placing 15th.

== Professional career (2019–present) ==
=== Hoka (2019–2021) ===
After graduating from BYU, Linkletter turned professional, signing with Hoka One One and joining Northern Arizona Elite, a training group based in Flagstaff, Arizona and coached by Ben Rosario.

In June 2019, Linkletter placed 3rd at the Canadian 10,000 m Championships. Later that summer he competed at the Pan American Games in Lima, where he placed 6th in the 10,000 m.

Just 10 weeks after the Pan Am Games, Linkletter made his marathon debut in Toronto, running a time of 2:16:42.

At his second marathon ever in December 2020, Linkletter ran a four-minute personal best of 2:12:54 at the Marathon Project in Chandler, Arizona.

After a disappointing 2021 Boston Marathon where he finished 33rd in 2:23:34, Linkletter rebounded with a two-second personal best and second-place finish at the 2021 California International Marathon where he ran a time of 2:12:52.

In December 2021, Linkletter announced he was leaving Hoka Northern Arizona Elite and coach Ben Rosario to pursue other opportunities.

=== Puma (2022–present) ===
In early 2022, Linkletter signed with Puma and began being coached by American half marathon record holder Ryan Hall, remaining in Flagstaff, Arizona.

In January 2022, Linkletter set a Canadian half marathon record of 1:01:08 at the Houston Half Marathon running over a 30-second personal best in the process.

In 2022, Linkletter was selected to compete in the marathon at the 2022 World Athletics Championships in Eugene, Oregon. He went on to run a two-minute personal best of 2:10:24, placing 20th and finishing as the second behind Cam Levins' Canadian record of 2:07:09.

In October 2022, Linkletter finished 7th at the Toronto Waterfront Marathon in 2:13:32, three minutes off his personal best from Eugene.

After pulling out of the 2023 London Marathon due to injury, Linkletter shifted focus to the marathon at the 2023 World Athletics Championships in Budapest. Amidst humid conditions in the Hungarian capital, Linkletter finished 18th in a time of 2:12:16, the second fastest marathon of his career.

In fall of 2023, Linkletter finished 4th at the Manchester Road Race and broke the four minutes in the mile for the first time, running 3:59.05 in Boston, becoming the 74th Canadian to run sub-4 and only the second to have done so whilst also having run a sub-2:12 marathon.

In January 2024, Linkletter ran a half marathon personal best of 1:01:02 at the Houston Half Marathon. The following month in Spain he ran a personal best of 2:08:01 at the Seville Marathon, achieving the Olympic standard of 2:08:10, making him eligible to be selected for the 2024 Summer Olympics, and becoming the second fastest Canadian of all time over the distance.

== Competition record ==
=== International Competitions ===
Representing Canada
Year	Competition	Venue	Position	Event	Time
2015	IAAF World Cross Country Championships	Guiyang, China	84th	Junior race	27:24
2017	IAAF World Cross Country Championships	Kampala, Uganda	76th	Senior race	31:54
2019	NACAC Cross Country Championships	Port of Spain, Trinidad and Tobago	6th	Senior race	32:13
2019	IAAF World Cross Country Championships	Aarhus, Denmark	81st	Senior race	35:05
2019	Pan American Games	Lima, Peru	6th	10,000 m	28:38.49
2022	World Championships	Eugene, Oregon	20th	Marathon	2:10:24
2023	World Championships	Budapest, Hungary	18th	Marathon	2:12:16
2024	Olympics	Paris, France	47th	Marathon	2:13:09

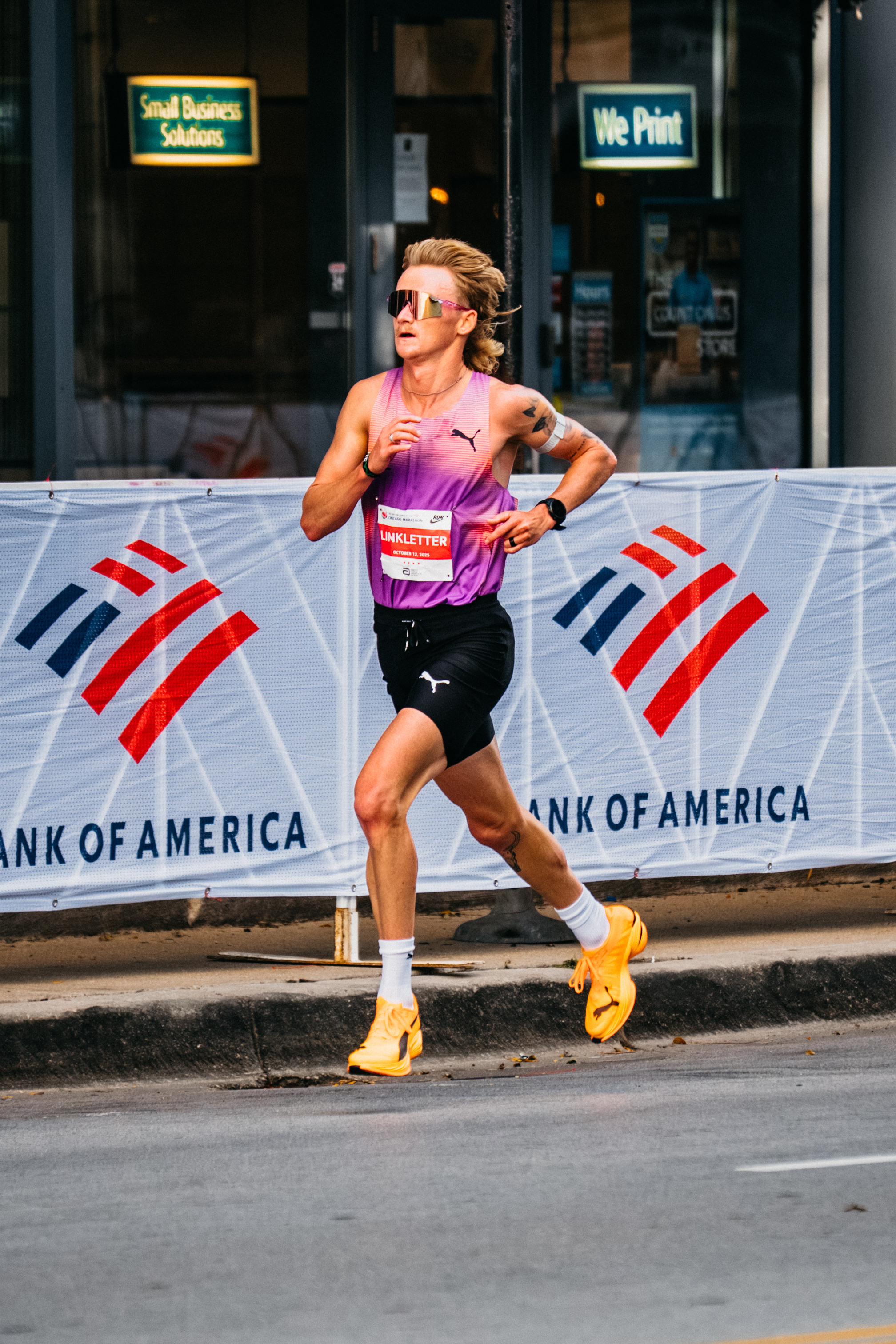
Linkletter at mile 25 of the 2025 Chicago Marathon

=== Marathons ===
Representing Hoka NAZ Elite (2019–21) and Puma (2022-present)
Year	Competition	Venue	Position	Time
2019	Toronto Waterfront Marathon	Toronto, Ontario	16th	2:16:42
2020	Marathon Project	Chandler, Arizona	17th	2:12:54
2021	Boston Marathon	Boston, Massachusetts	33rd	2:23:34
2021	California International Marathon	Sacramento, California	2nd	2:12:52
2022	Toronto Waterfront Marathon	Toronto, Ontario	7th	2:13:32
2024	Seville Marathon	Seville, Spain	13th	2:08:01
2024	New York City Marathon	New York City, New York	15th	2:11:45
2025	Boston Marathon	Boston, Massachusetts	6th	2:07:02
2025	Ottawa Marathon	Ottawa, Ontario	1st	2:08:31
2025	Chicago Marathon	Chicago, Illinois	9th	2:06:49
2026	Boston Marathon	Boston, Massachusetts	14th	2:06:04

=== Other Road Races ===
Representing Hoka NAZ Elite (2019–21) and Puma (2022-present)
Year	Competition	Venue	Position	Event	Time
2020	Houston Half Marathon	Houston Texas	15th	Half marathon	1:01:44
2020	Michigan Pro Half Marathon	Oakland County, Michigan	9th	Half marathon	1:02:37
2021	US 15 km Road Running Championships	Jacksonville, Florida	13th	15 km	44:41
2021	Valley ONE Half Marathon	Valley, Nebraska	1st	Half marathon	1:03:57
2021	4 July Downtown Mile	Flagstaff, Arizona	5th	Mile	4:20
2021	Deseret News 10K	Salt Lake City, Utah	1st	10 km	28:06
2022	Houston Half Marathon	Houston, Texas	8th	Half marathon	1:01:08
2022	Atlanta Half Marathon	Atlanta, Georgia	5th	Half marathon	1:05:19
2022	New York City Half Marathon	New York City, New York	10th	Half marathon	1:02:19
2022	Cooper River Bridge Run	Charleston, South Carolina	6th	10 km	28:43
2022	Canadian 10 km Championships	Ottawa, Ontario	2nd	10 km	29:02
2022	Copenhagen Half Marathon	Copenhagen, Denmark	45th	Half marathon	1:04:28
2023	New York City Half Marathon	New York City, New York	15th	Half marathon	1:04:21
2023	Canadian 10 km Championships	Ottawa, Ontario	7th	10 km	29:51
2023	Peachtree Road Race	Atlanta, Georgia	17th	10 km	29:12
2023	Manchester Road Race	Manchester, Connecticut	4th	7.641 km	21:17
2024	Houston Half Marathon	Houston, Texas	6th	Half marathon	1:01:02
2024	Gifu Half Marathon	Gifu, Japan	14th	Half marathon	1:04:16
2025	Kagawa Marugame Half Marathon	Marugame, Japan	23rd	Half marathon	1:00:57
2025	Mesa Half Marathon	Mesa, Arizona	1st	Half marathon	1:02:38
2025	Edmonton Half Marathon	Edmonton, Alberta	1st	Half Marathon	1:03:00
2026	Houston Half Marathon	Houston, Texas	7th	Half Marathon	59:49
2026	New York City Half Marathon	New York City, New York	7th	Half Marathon	1:00:00
