= Gulshat Fazlitdinova =

Russian long-distance runner

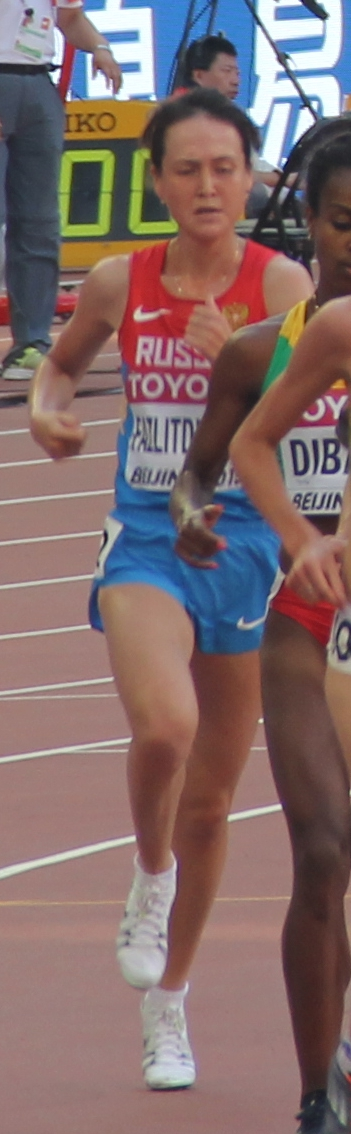
- Gulshat Fazlitdinova in 2015

Personal information
- Born: 28 August 1992 (age 33)

Sport
- Country: Russia
- Sport: Track and field
- Event: 5000 metres

Gulshat Fazlitdinova (born 28 August 1992) is a Russian long-distance runner. She competed in the 5000 metres event at the 2015 World Championships in Athletics in Beijing, China.
