= Evan Esselink =

Canadian long-distance runner

Personal information
- Born: 28 February 1992 (age 33)

Sport
- Country: Canada
- Sport: Long-distance running

Evan Esselink (born 28 February 1992) is a Canadian long-distance runner.

== Biography ==
Esselink attended Courtice Secondary School before competing for Indiana University, where he studied economics.

In 2017, he competed in the senior men's race at the 2017 IAAF World Cross Country Championships held in Kampala, Uganda. He finished in 88th place. In 2017, he also represented Canada at the 2017 Summer Universiade and he finished in 13th place in the men's 10,000 metres event.

In 2018, he competed in the men's half marathon at the 2018 IAAF World Half Marathon Championships held in Valencia, Spain. He finished in 114th place.

In 2019, he finished in 9th place in the senior 10,000 metres event at the 2019 NACAC Cross Country Championships held in Port of Spain, Trinidad and Tobago.
