= Sara Brogiato =

Italian long-distance runner

Personal information
- National team: Italy (3 caps)
- Born: 19 March 1990 (age 36) Moncalieri, Italy
- Height: 1.66 m (5 ft 5 in)
- Weight: 45 kg (99 lb)

Sport
- Country: Italy
- Sport: Athletics
- Event: Long-distance running
- Club: C.S. Aeronautica Militare
- Coached by: Gianni Crepaldi

Achievements and titles
- Personal best: Half marathon: 1:13:53 (2018)

Sara Brogiato (born 19 March 1990) is an Italian female long-distance runner who competed at individual senior level at the IAAF World Half Marathon Championships.

== National titles ==
She won a national championships at individual senior level.

- Italian Athletics Championships
  - Half marathon: 2017
