= Charlotte Arter =

Welsh runner

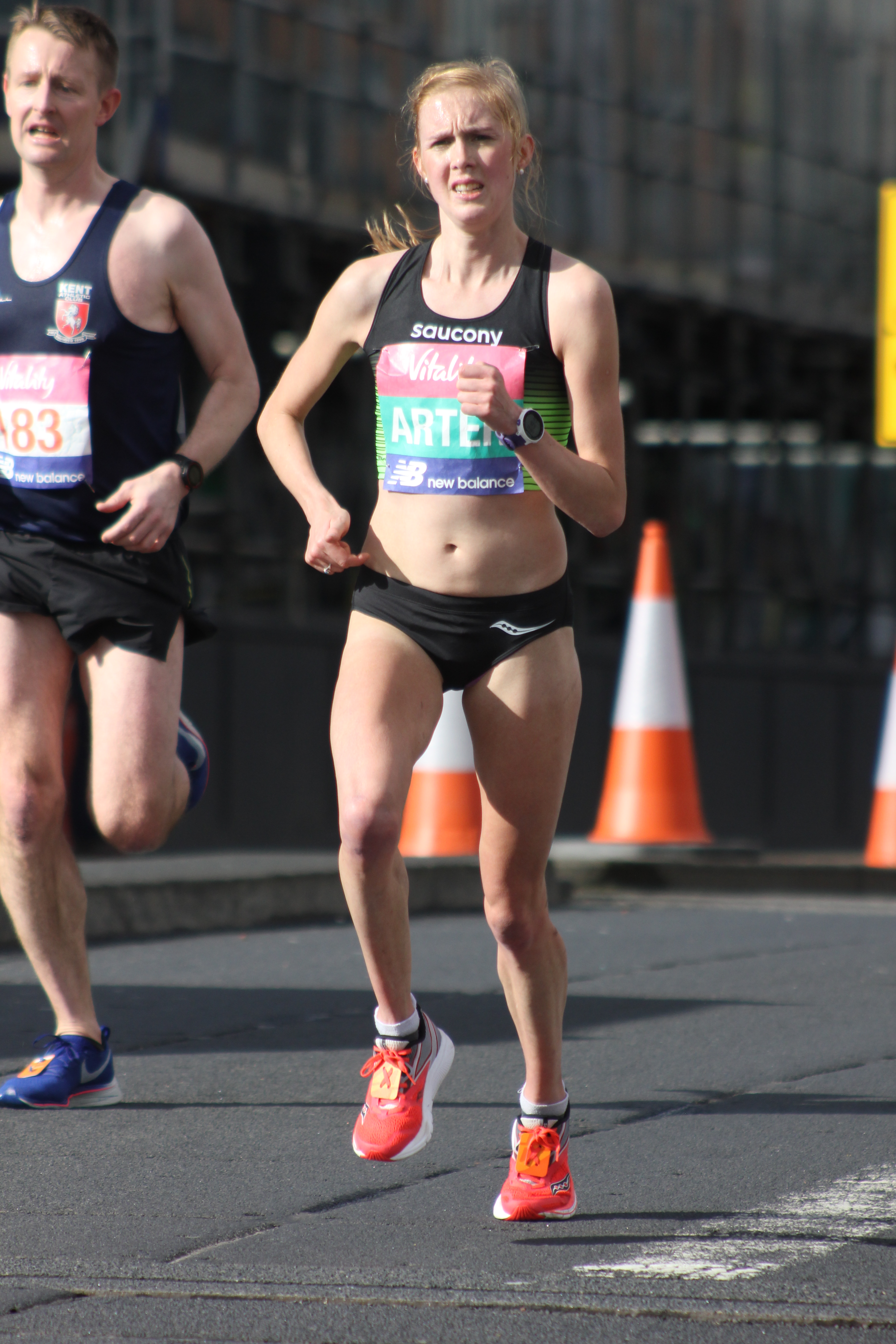
Charlotte Arter competing in London Half Marathon, 10 March 2019

Charlotte Arter (born 18 June 1991) is a British distance athlete. Arter comes from Cumbria but represents Wales in athletics, having qualified via the residency rule. Arter previously worked for Cardiff University, managing their high performance athletics programme. She is the current Welsh record holder in the half marathon. She is the current joint women's Parkrun record holder, setting a time of 15 minutes and 49 seconds at Cardiff Parkrun on 1 February 2020. She was the 2018 British 10,000m champion.

Arter was selected to represent Wales at the 2022 Commonwealth Games, but she had to withdraw for medical reasons and did not compete.
