= 2011 World Youth Championships in Athletics – Boys' 3000 metres =

Boys' 3000 metres at the 2011 World Youth Championships in Athletics
- Venue: Stadium Lille Métropole
- Dates: 7 July (heats); 10 July (final)
- Competitors: 29
- Winning time: 7:40.10 CR

Medalists
gold medal	William Malel Sitonik	Kenya
silver medal	Patrick Mutunga Mwikya	Kenya
bronze medal	Abrar Osman	Eritrea

The boys' 3000 metres at the 2011 World Youth Championships in Athletics was held at the Stadium Lille Métropole on 7 and 10 July.

== Medalists ==
Gold	Silver	Bronze
William Malel Sitonik; Kenya	Patrick Mutunga Mwikya; Kenya	Abrar Osman; Eritrea

== Records ==
Prior to the competition, the following records were as follows.

World Youth Best	Abreham Cherkos (ETH)	7:32.37	Lausanne, Switzerland	11 July 2006
Championship Record	Isiah Koech (KEN)	7:51.51	Bressanone, Italy	12 July 2009
World Youth Leading	William Malel Sitonik (KEN)	7:51.2	Nairobi, Kenya	8 June 2011

== Heats ==
Qualification rule: first 4 of each heat (Q) plus the 4 fastest times (q) qualified.

=== Heat 1 ===
Rank	Name	Nationality	Time	Notes
1	Patrick Mutunga Mwikya	Kenya	8:00.00	Q
2	Solomon Deksisa	Ethiopia	8:00.11	Q, PB
3	Mohammed Abid	Morocco	8:01.52	Q
4	Indrajeet Patel	India	8:14.93	Q, PB
5	Yusuke Uchikoshi	Japan	8:18.84	q, PB
6	Abdullah Al-Salhi	Saudi Arabia	8:21.86	q, PB
7	Samuele Dini	Italy	8:23.35	PB
8	Bohdan-Ivan Horodyskyi	Ukraine	8:26.71	PB
9	Dino Bošnjak	Croatia	8:27.01	PB
10	Ismael Quiñones	Spain	8:31.22	PB
11	Seyyid Boughalem	Algeria	8:33.24	PB
12	Matthew Stephenson	Canada	8:33.34	
13	Zacharias Grassmé Taj	Denmark	8:37.21	PB
14	Mihai Cosma	Romania	8:55.36	

=== Heat 2 ===
Rank	Name	Nationality	Time	Notes
1	William Malel Sitonik	Kenya	7:54.09	Q
2	Hagos Gebrhiwet	Ethiopia	7:54.09	Q, PB
3	Abrar Osman	Eritrea	7:58.00	Q, PB
4	Phillip Kipyeko	Uganda	8:14.02	Q, PB
5	Yuki Hirota	Japan	8:16.05	q, PB
6	Harry Mulenga	Zambia	8:17.01	q, SB
7	Marouane Kahlaoui	Morocco	8:22.89	PB
8	Félix Bour	France	8:23.66	PB
9	Ryan Sleiman	Canada	8:28.28	PB
10	Youcef Addouche	Algeria	8:30.75	PB
11	Artur Bossy	Spain	8:30.96	PB
12	Bogdan Motogna	Romania	8:40.17	PB
13	Jacob Simonsen	Denmark	8:49.05	
14	Abdallahi Cheikh	Mauritania	10:43.77	PB
	Khalid Mohammed Ahmed	Sudan	DNF	

== Final ==
Rank	Name	Nationality	Time	Notes
1st place, gold medalist(s)	William Malel Sitonik	Kenya	7:40.10	CR
2nd place, silver medalist(s)	Patrick Mutunga Mwikya	Kenya	7:40.47	PB
3rd place, bronze medalist(s)	Abrar Osman	Eritrea	7:40.89	PB
4	Solomon Deksisa	Ethiopia	7:42.10	PB
5	Hagos Gebrhiwet	Ethiopia	7:45.11	PB
6	Mohammed Abid	Morocco	7:57.45	PB
7	Phillip Kipyeko	Uganda	8:11.12	PB
8	Harry Mulenga	Zambia	8:11.14	PB
9	Yuki Hirota	Japan	8:13.65	PB
10	Yusuke Uchikoshi	Japan	8:14.91	PB
11	Abdullah Al-Salhi	Saudi Arabia	8:16.39	PB
12	Indrajeet Patel	India	8:19.73	
