= Athletics at the 2016 Summer Olympics – Men's 5000 metres =

Men's 5000 metres at the Games of the XXXI Olympiad
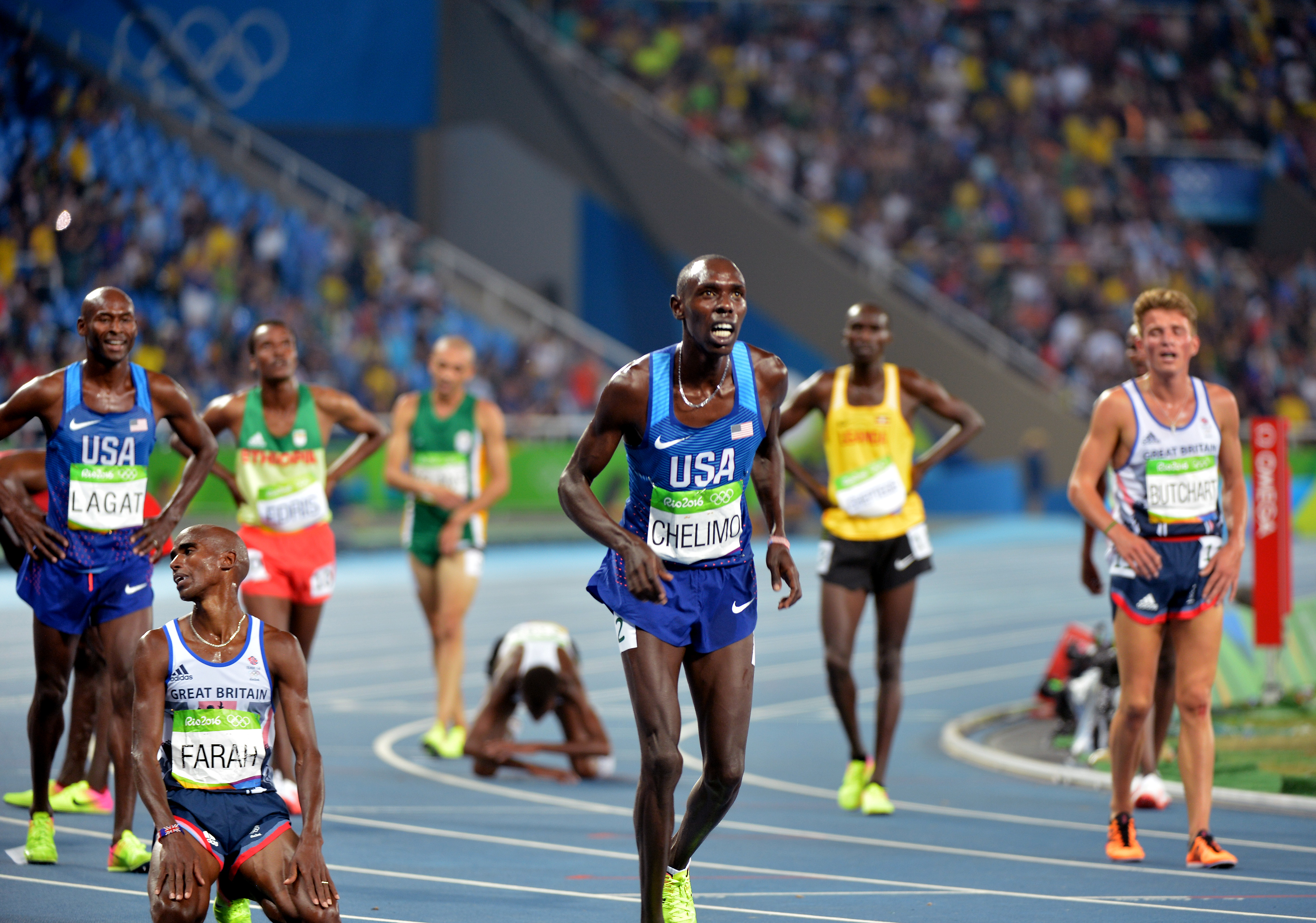
- Bernard Lagat, Mo Farah, Muktar Edris, Paul Chelimo, Joshua Cheptegei, Andrew Butchart after finish
- Venue: Olympic Stadium
- Dates: 17 August 2016 (heats); 20 August 2016 (final)
- Winning time: 13:03.30

Medalists
1st place, gold medalist(s)		Mo Farah	Great Britain
2nd place, silver medalist(s)		Paul Kipkemoi Chelimo	United States
3rd place, bronze medalist(s)		Hagos Gebrhiwet	Ethiopia

The men's 5000 metres event at the 2016 Summer Olympics took place between 16 and 20 August at the Olympic Stadium. The winning margin was 0.60 seconds.

== Summary ==
Mo Farah entered as the favourite for the race, having won the 2012 Olympic title as well as the last two World Championships 5000 m. He also held the fastest time of the year at 12:59:29 minutes and won the Olympic 10,000 m earlier in Rio. His primary challengers included 2015 World medallists Caleb Ndiku of Kenya and Ethiopia's Hagos Gebrhiwet (with the latter having shown the best form that year). Another Ethiopian, Dejen Gebremeskel (the 2012 Olympic runner-up) was also in the race, as was three-time 5000 m world medallist Bernard Lagat.

The preliminaries delivered a shock as distance running power Kenya placed no athletes in the final. However, three Kenyan immigrants to other countries ran in the final; Paul Kipkemoi Chelimo and 41-year-old Bernard Lagat of the United States and Albert Kibichii Rop of Bahrain. The East African representation was strong with three Ethiopians in the final (plus Birhanu Balew running for Bahrain). Uganda qualified two athletes. Mohammed Ahmed running for Canada, Hassan Mead running for the United States and the defending champion Mo Farah running for Great Britain were born in Somalia. Andrew Butchart was a second British finalist, and David Torrence, an American-born athlete, ran for Peru. During the first preliminary heat, Mead's front foot met Farah's back foot, both runners stumbling, Mead crashing to the track. Farah righted himself and continued on to the finish, qualifying third. After the race a successful protest was filed by the United States, and Mead advanced to the final as a result. No one was disqualified.

This race was the completion of Farah's attempt to complete the second Woolworth double (5 and 10). His race tactics were well known and his results consistent. Somebody had to do something different in order to beat him. From the gun in the final, two Ethiopian runners went to the front, while Farah dropped to his customary tail end position. Dejen Gebremeskel and Hagos Gebrhiwet went to the front and were pushing the pace. Paul Kipkemoi Chelimo moved in behind them. Farah sensed the change in tactics and moved up much earlier than normal to a position in the middle of the strung out pack, to watch the action. While the two Ethiopians were sharing the lead duty, Gebrhiwet was taking the lion's share. 19 year old Joshua Kiprui Cheptegei moved in to mark Farah's moves. With five and a half laps to go, the situation started to change. Chelimo moved up, passing Gebrhiwet, who fell back into the field. Farah used this occasion to hit the front.

Down the backstretch with 4 and a half laps to go, many tried to move to the front to mark Farah, with elbows flying in the tightening pack. From this point Farah began to control the race, with Rop, Chelimo, the third Ethiopian Muktar Edris, Mead, Gebremeskel, Gebrhiwet, Cheptegei, Butchart, Ahmed and Lagat all in a row behind Farah. During the next lap and a half Butchart moved closer to Farah on the outside, then with almost 3 laps to go, went around the outside and onto Farah's shoulder, creating a British team wall similar to the blocking techniques the Kenyans usually use. Cheptegei then moved to the outside of the wall making it three wide. Butchart was only able to stay there for about a half lap before falling back into the pack, but Cheptegei remained in place. Edris was looking for a way around.

With a lap and a half to go, Cheptegei tried to speed up to go around Farah, but Farah exactly matched his speed. The rules of the road were clearly explained to the youngster, do not pass. Finally Gebrhiwet, bounced out of the pack several places behind at the same time Edris moved, the two collided with Edris bouncing sideways as Gebrhiwet made the bold move around Cheptegei and was ahead of Farah at the line and sprinting. He didn't want to give Farah the opportunity to get the jump on him like in the two previous World Championships. In the next 50 metres, Farah explained the rules of the road to him too, the two exchanging elbows as Farah would not let Gebrhiwet to move to the inside. When Gebrhiwet relented Chelimo filled the space between him and the curb, right behind Farah. Down the final backstretch, Gebrhiwet tried one more time, elbowing Chelimo as he went by with Chelimo losing his balance for a moment, then making contact with Ahmed following Gebrhiwet. Getting untangled, Chelimo ran down the backstretch after Gebrhiwet, who still couldn't get around Farah. Gebrhiwet slowed a little, Chelimo was again pinned to the curb, more contact with Ahmed as Chelimo was looking for running space. Chelimo moved to the outside, leaving Gebrhiwet on the curb behind Farah. Edris elbowed his way inside of Ahmed as he passed. After all the contact, Chelimo was in the perfect position to sprint past Farah on the home stretch. Chelimo almost got to Farah's shoulder but Farah accelerated again, pulling away to the win by five metres, still looking over his shoulder to make sure there was no further challenge. Chelimo finished second, Gebrhiwet, Edris, Ahmed and Lagat.

Farah knelt and kissed the track. After the celebration and victory lap, it was announced that Chelimo, Ahmed and Edris were disqualified, giving Gebrhiwet the silver and Lagat the bronze. Being interviewed on American television, Chelimo was shocked. An appeal was filed and the decision was mostly reversed. Chelimo was reinstated as the silver medalist, Ahmed was also reinstated when it was found that they did not break the rules while Edris' disqualification would stand.

The medals for the competition were presented by Anant Singh, South Africa, IOC member, and the gifts were presented by Ahmed Al Kamali, IAAF Council Member.

== Records ==
Prior to this competition, the existing global and area records were as follows:

World record	Kenenisa Bekele (ETH)	12:37.35	Hengelo, Netherlands	31 May 2004
Olympic record	Kenenisa Bekele (ETH)	12:57.82	Beijing, China	23 August 2008
World Leading	Mo Farah (GBR)	12:59.29	London, United Kingdom	23 July 2016

Area
Area	Time (s)	Athlete	Nation
Africa (records)	12:37.35 WR	Kenenisa Bekele	Ethiopia
Asia (records)	12:51.96	Albert Rop	Bahrain
Europe (records)	12:49.71	Mohammed Mourhit	Belgium
North, Central America and Caribbean (records)	12:53.60	Bernard Lagat	United States
Oceania (records)	12:55.76	Craig Mottram	Australia
South America (records)	13:19.43	Marilson dos Santos	Brazil

The following national record was established during the competition:

Country	Athlete	Round	Time	Notes
Peru	David Torrence (PER)	Heats	13:23.20	

== Results ==
=== Heats ===
Qualification rules: First 5 in each heat (Q) and the next 5 fastest (q) advance to the Final.

==== Heat 1 ====
Rank	Athlete	Nationality	Time	Notes
1	Hagos Gebrhiwet	Ethiopia	13:24.65	Q
2	Albert Kibichii Rop	Bahrain	13:24.95	Q
3	Mo Farah	Great Britain	13:25.25	Q
4	Joshua Kiprui Cheptegei	Uganda	13:25.70	Q
5	Bernard Lagat	United States	13:26.02	Q
6	Caleb Ndiku	Kenya	13:26.63	
7	Hayle Ibrahimov	Azerbaijan	13:27.11	
8	Aron Kifle	Eritrea	13:29.45	
9	Ilias Fifa	Spain	13:30.23	
10	Kemoy Campbell	Jamaica	13:30.32	
11	Jacob Kiplimo	Uganda	13:30.40	
12	Charles Yosei Muneria	Kenya	13:30.95	
13	Hassan Mead	United States	13:34.27	q
14	Younès Essalhi	Morocco	13:41.41	
15	Namakoe Nkhasi	Lesotho	13:41.92	
16	Bashir Abdi	Belgium	13:42.83	
17	Olivier Irabaruta	Burundi	13:44.08	
18	Sam McEntee	Australia	13:50.55	
19	Lucas Bruchet	Canada	14:02.02	
20	Richard Ringer	Germany	14:05.01	
21	Mukhlid Al-Otaibi	Saudi Arabia	14:18.48	
22	Kota Murayama	Japan	14:26.72	
23	Hari Kumar Rimal	Nepal	14:54.42	
24	Mohamed Daud Mohamed	Somalia	14:57.84	
25	Rosefelo Siosi	Solomon Islands	15:47.76	PB

==== Heat 2 ====
Rank	Athlete	Nationality	Time	Notes
1	Paul Kipkemoi Chelimo	United States	13:19.54	Q, PB
2	Muktar Edris	Ethiopia	13:19.65	Q
3	Dejen Gebremeskel	Ethiopia	13:19.67	Q
4	Birhanu Balew	Bahrain	13:19.83	Q
5	Andrew Butchart	Great Britain	13:20.08	Q
6	Mohammed Ahmed	Canada	13:21.00	q
7	Elroy Gelant	South Africa	13:22.00	q
8	Abrar Osman	Eritrea	13:22.56	q
9	Brett Robinson	Australia	13:22.81	q
10	David Torrence	Peru	13:23.20	q, NR
11	Phillip Kipyeko	Uganda	13:24.66	SB
12	Isiah Koech	Kenya	13:25.15	
13	Patrick Tiernan	Australia	13:28.48	
14	Florian Orth	Germany	13:28.88	
15	Hiskel Tewelde	Eritrea	13:30.23	
16	Suguru Osako	Japan	13:31.45	SB
17	Adel Mechaal	Spain	13:34.42	
18	Soufiyan Bouqantar	Morocco	13:56.55	
19	Ali Kaya	Turkey	14:05.34	
20	Tom Farrell	Great Britain	14:11.65	
21	Tariq Ahmed Al-Amri	Saudi Arabia	14:26.90	
22	Antonio Abadía	Spain	14:33.20	
23	Kefasi Chitsala	Malawi	14:52.89	
24	San Naing	Myanmar	15:51.05	
25	Romario Leitao	São Tomé and Príncipe	15:53.32	
–	Zouhair Aouad	Bahrain	DNF	

=== Final ===
Rank	Athlete	Nation	Time	Notes
1st place, gold medalist(s)	Mo Farah	Great Britain	13:03.30	
2nd place, silver medalist(s)	Paul Kipkemoi Chelimo	United States	13:03.90	PB
3rd place, bronze medalist(s)	Hagos Gebrhiwet	Ethiopia	13:04.35	
4	Mohammed Ahmed	Canada	13:05.94	
5	Bernard Lagat	United States	13:06.78	SB
6	Andrew Butchart	Great Britain	13:08.61	PB
7	Albert Kibichii Rop	Bahrain	13:08.79	
8	Joshua Kiprui Cheptegei	Uganda	13:09.17	
9	Birhanu Balew	Bahrain	13:09.26	PB
10	Abrar Osman	Eritrea	13:09.56	
11	Hassan Mead	United States	13:09.81	
12	Dejen Gebremeskel	Ethiopia	13:15.91	
13	Elroy Gelant	South Africa	13:17.47	
14	Brett Robinson	Australia	13:32.30	
15	David Torrence	Peru	13:43.12	
–	Muktar Edris	Ethiopia	DQ	R 163.3b
