= 2014 IAAF World Indoor Championships – Men's 3000 metres =

Men's 3000 metres at the 2014 IAAF World Indoor Championships
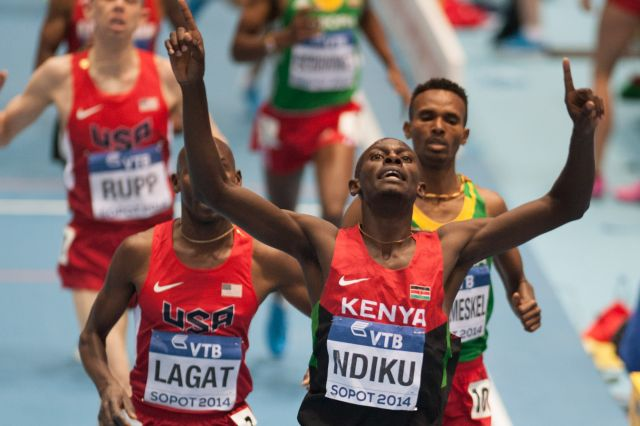
- Ndiku crossing line in the final.
- Venue: Ergo Arena
- Dates: 7 March (heats); 9 March (final)
- Competitors: 20 from 15 nations
- Winning time: 7:54.94

Medalists
gold medal	Caleb Ndiku	Kenya
silver medal	Bernard Lagat	United States
bronze medal	Dejen Gebremeskel	Ethiopia

The men's 3000 metres at the 2014 IAAF World Indoor Championships took place on 7 and 9 March 2014.

== Records ==
Standing records prior to the 2014 IAAF World Indoor Championships
World record	Daniel Komen (KEN)	7:24.90	Budapest, Hungary	6 February 1998
Championship record	Haile Gebrselassie (ETH)	7:34.71	Paris, France	9 March 1997
World leading	Hagos Gebrhiwet (ETH)	7:34.13	Boston, United States	8 February 2014
African record	Daniel Komen (KEN)	7:24.90	Budapest, Hungary	6 February 1998
Asian record	Saif Saaeed Shaheen (QAT)	7:39.77	Pattaya, Thailand	11 February 2006
European record	Sergio Sánchez (ESP)	7:32.41	Valencia, Spain	13 February 2010
North and Central American and Caribbean record	Galen Rupp (USA)	7:30.16	Stockholm, Sweden	21 February 2013
Oceanian record	Craig Mottram (AUS)	7:34.50	Boston, United States	26 January 2008
South American record	Jacinto Navarrete (COL)	7:49.46	Seville, Spain	10 March 1991

== Qualification standards ==
Indoor	Outdoor
7:52.00	7:42.00 or 13:15.00 (5000 m)

== Schedule ==
Date	Time	Round
7 March 2014	20:25	Heats
9 March 2014	16:10	Final

== Results ==
=== Heats ===
Qualification: First 4 in each heat (Q) and the next 4 fastest (q) qualified for the final.

Rank	Heat	Name	Nationality	Time	Notes
1	2	Caleb Ndiku	Kenya	7:42.75	Q
2	2	Hagos Gebrhiwet	Ethiopia	7:42.95	Q
3	2	Bernard Lagat	United States	7:42.98	Q
4	2	Hayle Ibrahimov	Azerbaijan	7:43.15	Q
5	2	Cameron Levins	Canada	7:44.04	q
6	2	Zane Robertson	New Zealand	7:44.16	q, NR
7	1	Augustine Kiprono Choge	Kenya	7:44.85	Q
8	1	Dejen Gebremeskel	Ethiopia	7:45.09	Q
9	1	Galen Rupp	United States	7:45.23	Q
10	1	Andy Vernon	Great Britain	7:45.49	Q, PB
11	1	Elroy Gelant	South Africa	7:45.85	q
12	1	Collis Birmingham	Australia	7:46.15	q, PB
13	2	Antonio Abadía	Spain	7:46.36	PB
DQ	1	Othmane El Goumri	Morocco	~~7:48.83~~	Doping
14	1	Ali Kaya	Turkey	7:51.27	
15	1	Łukasz Parszczyński	Poland	7:52.91	
16	1	Youssouf Hiss Bachir	Djibouti	7:53.96	
DQ	2	Abdelhadi Labäli	Morocco	~~7:54.32~~	Doping
17	2	Jonathan Mellor	Great Britain	8:03.17	
	2	Yoann Kowal	France	DQ	R163.3(b)

=== Final ===
Rank	Name	Nationality	Time	Notes
1st place, gold medalist(s)	Caleb Ndiku	Kenya	7:54.94	
2nd place, silver medalist(s)	Bernard Lagat	United States	7:55.22	
3rd place, bronze medalist(s)	Dejen Gebremeskel	Ethiopia	7:55.39	
4	Galen Rupp	United States	7:55.84	
5	Hagos Gebrhiwet	Ethiopia	7:56.34	
6	Hayle Ibrahimov	Azerbaijan	7:56.37	
7	Elroy Gelant	South Africa	7:57.31	
8	Cameron Levins	Canada	7:57.37	
9	Augustine Kiprono Choge	Kenya	7:57.46	
10	Collis Birmingham	Australia	7:57.55	
11	Andy Vernon	Great Britain	7:58.25	
12	Zane Robertson	New Zealand	8:01.81	
