= 2012 World Junior Championships in Athletics – Men's 5000 metres =

The men's 5000 metres at the 2012 World Junior Championships in Athletics was held at the Estadi Olímpic Lluís Companys on 14 July.

== Medalists ==
Gold	Silver	Bronze
Muktar Edris; Ethiopia	Abrar Osman Adem; Eritrea	Wiliam Malel Sitonik; Kenya

== Records ==
Prior to the competition, the existing world junior and championship records were as follows.

World Junior Record	Eliud Kipchoge (KEN)	12:52.61	Oslo, Norway	27 June 2003
Championship Record	Abreham Cherkos (ETH)	13:08.57	Bydgoszcz, Poland	13 July 2008
World Junior Leading	Isiah Kiplangat Koech (KEN)	12:57.63	Eugene, United States	2 June 2012

== Results ==
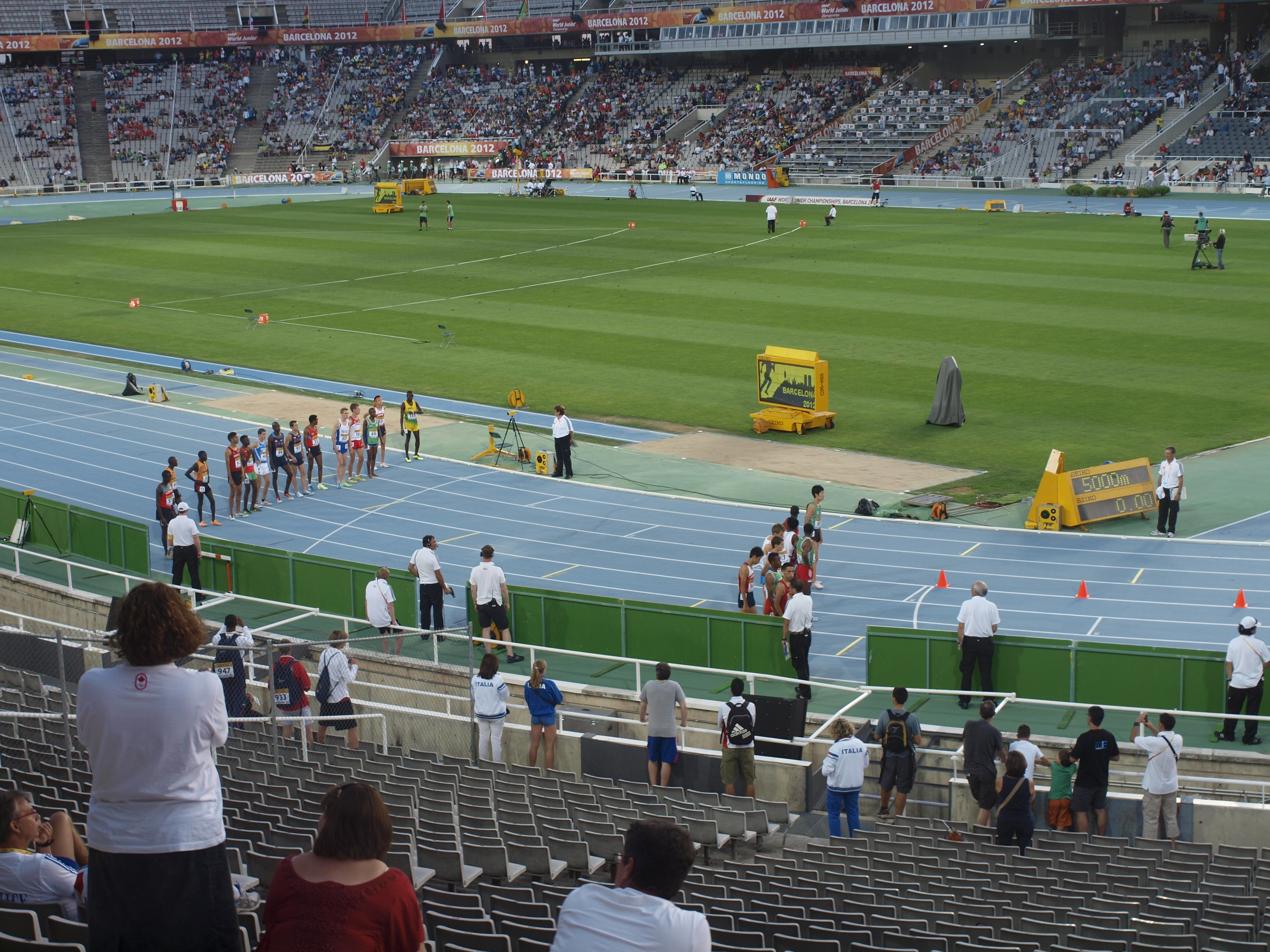
The start of the 5000 metres

Rank	Name	Nationality	Time	Note
1st place, gold medalist(s)	Muktar Edris	Ethiopia	13:38.95	
2nd place, silver medalist(s)	Abrar Osman Adem	Eritrea	13:40.52	
3rd place, bronze medalist(s)	Wiliam Malel Sitonik	Kenya	13:40.52	
4	Younés Essalhi	Morocco	13:41.69	PB
5	Tsegaye Mekonnen	Ethiopia	13:44.43	PB
6	Phillip Kipyeko	Uganda	13:45.52	PB
7	Moses Martin Kurong	Uganda	13:52.96	
8	Moses Mukono Letoyie	Kenya	13:56.60	
9	Dino Bošnjak	Croatia	14:13.48	NJ
10	François Barrer	France	14:16.46	
11	Kota Murayama	Japan	14:18.24	
12	Krubhli Shiferaw Erassa	United States	14:19.28	
13	Kyle King	United States	14:19.97	
14	Kazuma Taira	Japan	14:22.95	
15	Lorenzo Dini	Italy	14:22.97	PB
16	Aaron Hendrikx	Canada	14:29.32	
17	Abdelmunaim Yahya Adam	Sudan	14:35.70	PB
18	Samuele Dini	Italy	14:43.43	PB
19	Souleiman Robleh	Djibouti	14:48.17	PB
20	Rethabile Molefi	Lesotho	14:50.60	PB
21	Myeongjun Son	South Korea	15:03.10	
22	Orye Lendoye	Gabon	19:03.89	PB
–	Soufiyan Bouqantar	Morocco	DNF	

== Participation ==
According to an unofficial count, 23 athletes from 16 countries participated in the event.

- Canada (1)
- Croatia (1)
- Djibouti (1)
- Eritrea (1)
- Ethiopia (2)
- France (1)
- Gabon (1)
- Italy (2)
- Japan (2)
- Kenya (2)
- Lesotho (1)
- Morocco (2)
- South Korea (1)
- Sudan (1)
- Uganda (2)
- United States (2)
