= 2014 African Championships in Athletics – Men's 5000 metres =

The men's 5000 metres event at the 2014 African Championships in Athletics was held on August 11 on Stade de Marrakech.

== Results ==
Rank	Name	Nationality	Time	Notes
1st place, gold medalist(s)	Caleb Mwangangi Ndiku	Kenya	13:34.27	
2nd place, silver medalist(s)	Isiah Koech	Kenya	13:35.73	
3rd place, bronze medalist(s)	Abrar Osman	Eritrea	13:36.42	
4	Joseph Kiplimo	Kenya	13:39.12	
5	Yenew Alamirew	Ethiopia	13:45.86	
6	Olivier Irabaruta	Burundi	13:46.21	
7	Thomas Ayeko	Uganda	13:51.61	
8	Birhanu Legese	Ethiopia	13:59.57	
9	Elroy Gelant	South Africa	14:00.48	
10	Mumin Gala	Djibouti	14:02.16	
11	Othmane El Goumri	Morocco	14:12.40	
12	Jamal Abdi Dirieh	Djibouti	14:15.78	
13	Masseho-Ngoma	Republic of the Congo	16:52.64	
	Hagos Gebrhiwet	Ethiopia	DNF	
	Hicham Bellani	Morocco	DNF	
	Jamal Hitran	Morocco	DNF	
	Dieudonne Nsengiyumva	Burundi	DNS	
	Naimbai Njerakey	Chad	DNS	
	Joshua Cheptegei	Uganda	DNS	
	Moses Kipsiro	Uganda	DNS	
