= 2016 IAAF World Indoor Championships – Men's 3000 metres =

Men's 3000 metres at the 2016 IAAF World Indoor Championships
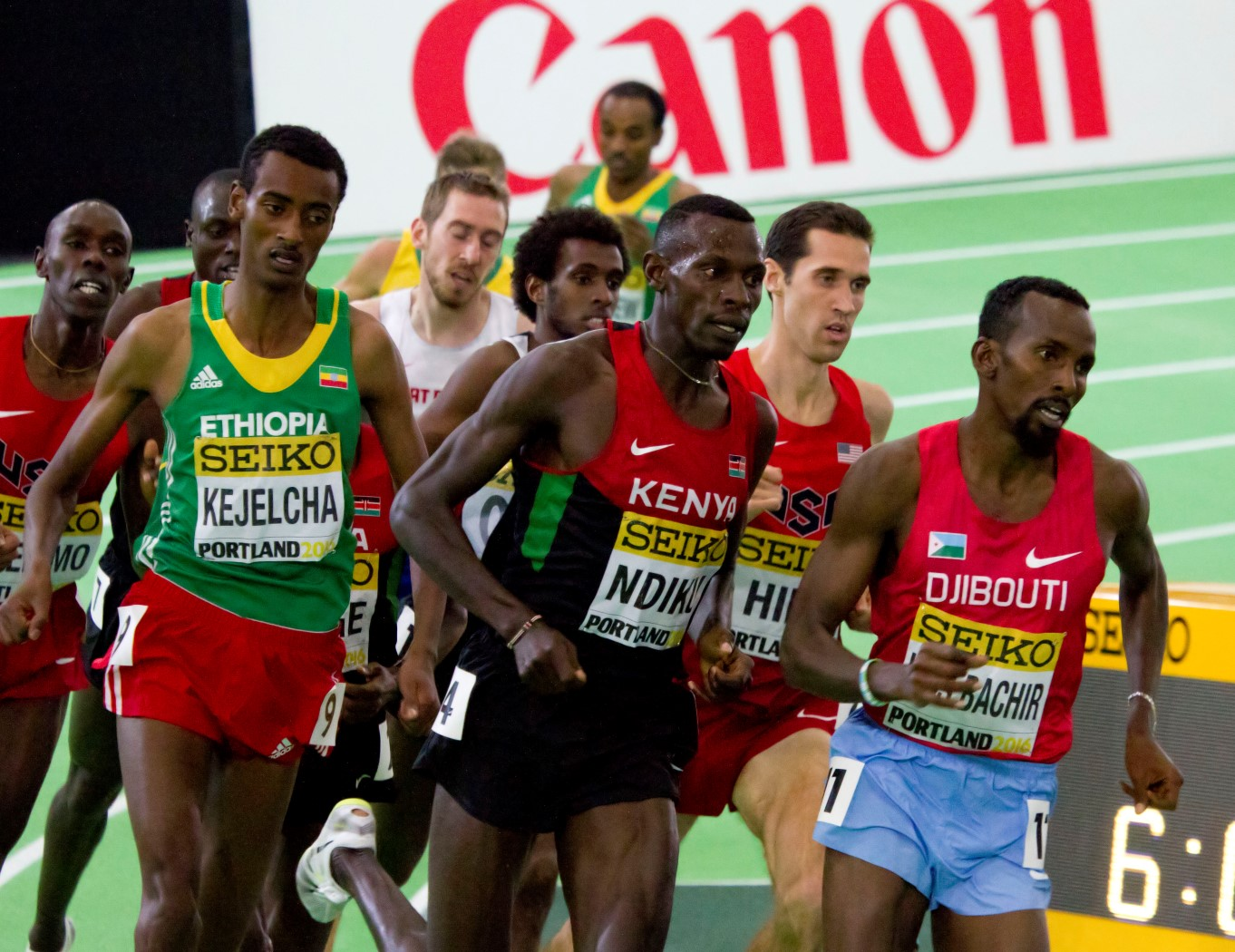
- Venue: Oregon Convention Center
- Dates: March 18 (heats); March 20 (final)
- Competitors: 18 from 11 nations
- Winning time: 7:57.21

Medalists
gold medal	Yomif Kejelcha	Ethiopia
silver medal	Ryan Hill	United States
bronze medal	Augustine Kiprono Choge	Kenya

Video on YouTube Official Video

The men's 3000 metres at the 2016 IAAF World Indoor Championships took place on March 18 and 20, 2016.

The final race started as a jog for these athletes, coming through 1K in 2:52, and hitting the half way point at 4:15, Isiah Kiplangat Koech holding the lead. With 6 laps to go, Caleb Mwangangi Ndiku ran around the field into the lead, the pace quickened, the rest of the field scrambling to react. The strongest reaction was by Youssouf Hiss Bachir, literally sprinting into the lead 100 metres later, exchanging elbows with Ndiku. For the next two and a half laps, Hiss Bachir held the lead, sprinting each time a challenger, usually Ndiku tried to creep past. With three laps to go Abdalaati Iguider sped through the inside and as he challenged Ndiku everyone sped up and Hiss Bachir disappeared through the field. The field began to string out. With two laps to go, Yomif Kejelcha hit the lead, with Ndiku, Augustine Kiprono Choge, Iguider and Ryan Hill the only ones to give chase. With a lap to go, the first four looked to challenge each other as Hill was falling back, but through the next to last turn, Hill began to accelerate catching Ndiku, who faded out the back. Kejelcha held the lead the entire way to the finish for gold, Choge and Iguider were unable to make headway as the chased. Coming off the final turn, Hill passed both of them, Choge in the final step, dipping at the line and dipping again in confusion after the line.

== Records ==
Standing records prior to the 2016 IAAF World Indoor Championships
World record	Daniel Komen (KEN)	7:24.90	Budapest, Hungary	6 February 1998
Championship record	Haile Gebrselassie (ETH)	7:34.71	Paris, France	9 March 1997
World Leading	Dejen Gebremeskel (ETH)	7:38.03	Boston, United States	28 February 2016
African record	Daniel Komen (KEN)	7:24.90	Budapest, Hungary	6 February 1998
Asian record	Albert Kibichii Rop (BHR)	7:38.77	Gent, Belgium	9 February 2014
European record	Sergio Sánchez (ESP)	7:32.41	Valencia, Spain	13 February 2010
North and Central American and Caribbean record	Galen Rupp (USA)	7:30.16	Stockholm, Sweden	21 February 2013
Oceanian Record	Craig Mottram (AUS)	7:34.50	Boston, United States	26 January 2008
South American record	Jacinto Navarrete (COL)	7:49.46	Sevilla, Spain	10 March 1991

== Qualification standards ==
Indoor	Outdoor
7:50.00	7:40.00; 13:10.00 (5000 m)

== Schedule ==
Date	Time	Round
18 March 2016	13:05	Heats
20 March 2016	13:10	Final

== Results ==
=== Heats ===
Qualification: First 4 (Q) and next 4 fastest (q) qualified for the semifinals.

Rank	Heat	Name	Nationality	Time	Notes
1	1	Yomif Kejelcha	Ethiopia	7:51.01	Q
2	2	Abdalaati Iguider	Morocco	7:51.65	Q
3	1	Augustine Kiprono Choge	Kenya	7:51.77	Q
4	1	Youssouf Hiss Bachir	Djibouti	7:52.08	Q
5	1	Ryan Hill	United States	7:52.13	Q
6	2	Isiah Kiplangat Koech	Kenya	7:52.64	Q
7	2	Paul Kipkemoi Chelimo	United States	7:53.00	Q
8	2	Lee Emanuel	Great Britain	7:53.18	Q SB
9	2	Caleb Mwangangi Ndiku	Kenya	7:53.21	q
10	1	Brett Robinson	Australia	7:53.51	q
11	2	Yenew Alamirew	Ethiopia	7:53.65	q
12	2	Mohammed Ahmed	Canada	7:53.66	q
13	2	Collis Birmingham	Australia	7:54.51	SB
14	1	Cameron Levins	Canada	7:54.81	
15	1	Tom Farrell	Great Britain	7:59.77	
16	1	Kemoy Campbell	Jamaica	8:00.22	
17	2	Víctor García	Spain	8:25.62	
18	1	Adilet Kyshtabekov	Kyrgyzstan	8:44.77	

=== Final ===
The race was started on March 20 at 13:10.

Rank	Name	Nationality	Time	Notes
1st place, gold medalist(s)	Yomif Kejelcha	Ethiopia	7:57.21	
2nd place, silver medalist(s)	Ryan Hill	United States	7:57.39	
3rd place, bronze medalist(s)	Augustine Kiprono Choge	Kenya	7:57.43	
4	Abdalaati Iguider	Morocco	7:58.04	
5	Caleb Mwangangi Ndiku	Kenya	7:58.81	
6	Lee Emanuel	Great Britain	8:00.70	
7	Paul Kipkemoi Chelimo	United States	8:00.76	
8	Isiah Kiplangat Koech	Kenya	8:01.70	
9	Mohammed Ahmed	Canada	8:07.96	
10	Youssouf Hiss Bachir	Djibouti	8:08.87	
11	Brett Robinson	Australia	8:11.11	
12	Yenew Alamirew	Ethiopia	8:12.54	
