= Athletics at the 2022 Commonwealth Games – Men's 1500 metres =

Men's 1500 metres at the 2022 Commonwealth Games
- Venue: Alexander Stadium
- Dates: 4 August (first round); 6 August (final)
- Competitors: 22 from 15 nations
- Winning time: 3:30.12

Medalists
gold medal	Ollie Hoare	Australia
silver medal	Timothy Cheruiyot	Kenya
bronze medal	Jake Wightman	Scotland

The men's 1500 metres at the 2022 Commonwealth Games, as part of the athletics programme, took place in the Alexander Stadium on 4 and 6 August 2022.

== Records ==
Prior to this competition, the existing world and Games records were as follows:

World record	Hicham El Guerrouj (MAR)	3:26.00	Rome, Italy	14 July 1998
Commonwealth record	Bernard Lagat (KEN)	3:26.34	Brussels, Belgium	24 August 2001
Games record	Filbert Bayi (TAN)	3:32.16	Christchurch, New Zealand	2 February 1974

== Schedule ==
The schedule was as follows:

Date	Time	Round
Thursday 4 August 2022	12:25	First round
Saturday 6 August 2022	13:10	Final

All times are British Summer Time (UTC+1)

== Results ==
=== First round ===
The first round consisted of two heats. The five fastest competitors per heat (plus four fastest losers) advanced to the final.

Rank	Heat	Name	Result	Notes
1	1	Ollie Hoare (AUS)	3:37.57	Q
2	1	Timothy Cheruiyot (KEN)	3:37.82	Q
3	1	Jake Heyward (WAL)	3:37.83	Q
4	1	Josh Kerr (SCO)	3:37.84	Q
5	1	Elliot Giles (ENG)	3:37.98	Q
6	1	William Paulson (CAN)	3:38.36	q
7	1	Ryan Mphahlele (RSA)	3:42.92	q
8	1	Abu Salim Mayanja (UGA)	3:46.56	
9	1	Dage Minors (BER)	3:46.67	
10	2	Jake Wightman (SCO)	3:48.34	Q
11	2	Matthew Stonier (ENG)	3:48.50	Q
12	2	Abel Kipsang (KEN)	3:48.63	Q
13	2	Neil Gourley (SCO)	3:48.64	Q
14	2	Sam Tanner (NZL)	3:48.65	Q
15	2	Matthew Ramsden (AUS)	3:48.98	
16	2	Piers Copeland (WAL)	3:49.18	
17	2	David Mullarkey (IOM)	3:50.06	
18	2	Emmanuel Otim (UGA)	3:51.35	
19	1	Alex Macuacua (MOZ)	3:57.48	
20	2	Iven Moise (SEY)	3:57.73	
21	1	Yeshnil Karan (FIJ)	4:04.22	
22	2	Andrew Rhobi (TAN)	4:07.85	PB
	2	Stewart McSweyn (AUS)	DNS	
	1	Kalique St. Jean (ANT)	DNS	

=== Final ===
The medals were determined in the final.

Rank	Name	Result	Notes
1st place, gold medalist(s)	Ollie Hoare (AUS)	3:30.12	GR, PB
2nd place, silver medalist(s)	Timothy Cheruiyot (KEN)	3:30.21	SB
3rd place, bronze medalist(s)	Jake Wightman (SCO)	3:30.53	
4	Abel Kipsang (KEN)	3:30.82	SB
5	Jake Heyward (WAL)	3:31.08	PB
6	Sam Tanner (NZL)	3:31.34	PB
7	Matthew Stonier (ENG)	3:32.50	PB
8	Neil Gourley (SCO)	3:32.93	PB
9	Elliot Giles (ENG)	3:33.56	PB
10	William Paulson (CAN)	3:33.97	=PB
11	Ryan Mphahlele (RSA)	3:34.66	PB
12	Josh Kerr (SCO)	3:35.72	
