= 2016 African Championships in Athletics – Men's 10,000 metres =

The men's 10,000 metres event at the 2016 African Championships in Athletics was held on 22 June in Kings Park Stadium.

== Results ==
Rank	Athlete	Nationality	Time	Notes
1st place, gold medalist(s)	Stephen Mokoka	South Africa	28:02.97	
2nd place, silver medalist(s)	Wilfred Kimitei	Kenya	28:03.18	
3rd place, bronze medalist(s)	Namakwe Nkhasi	Lesotho	28:06.33	NR
4	Jemal Yimer	Ethiopia	28:08.92	
5	Fikadu Haftu	Ethiopia	28:09.21	
6	Stephen Arita	Kenya	28:09.66	
7	Ismail Gallet	Tanzania	28:13.46	
8	Abraham Habte	Eritrea	28:18.18	
9	Abdallah Mande Kibet	Uganda	28:21.92	
10	Gladwin Mzazi	South Africa	28:24.50	
11	Arega Mekonen	Ethiopia	28:37.41	
12	Fabiano Sulle	Tanzania	29:09.75	
13	John Atem	South Sudan	29:53.67	
14	Happy Ndacha Mcherewje	Malawi	29:59.94	
15	Jacob Mugomeri	Zimbabwe	30:05.75	
16	Jauodo Jauodo	Mozambique	32:01.59	
17	Stephanus Kaudinge	Namibia	34:05.63	
	David Kulang	South Sudan	DNS	
	Jean Marie Vianney Niyomukiza	Burundi	DNS	
	Onesphore Nzikwikunda	Burundi	DNS	
	Mohamed Firsa Enyem	Sudan	DNS	
	Melusi Sihlongonyane	Swaziland	DNS	
