= Othmane El Goumri =

Moroccan long-distance runner

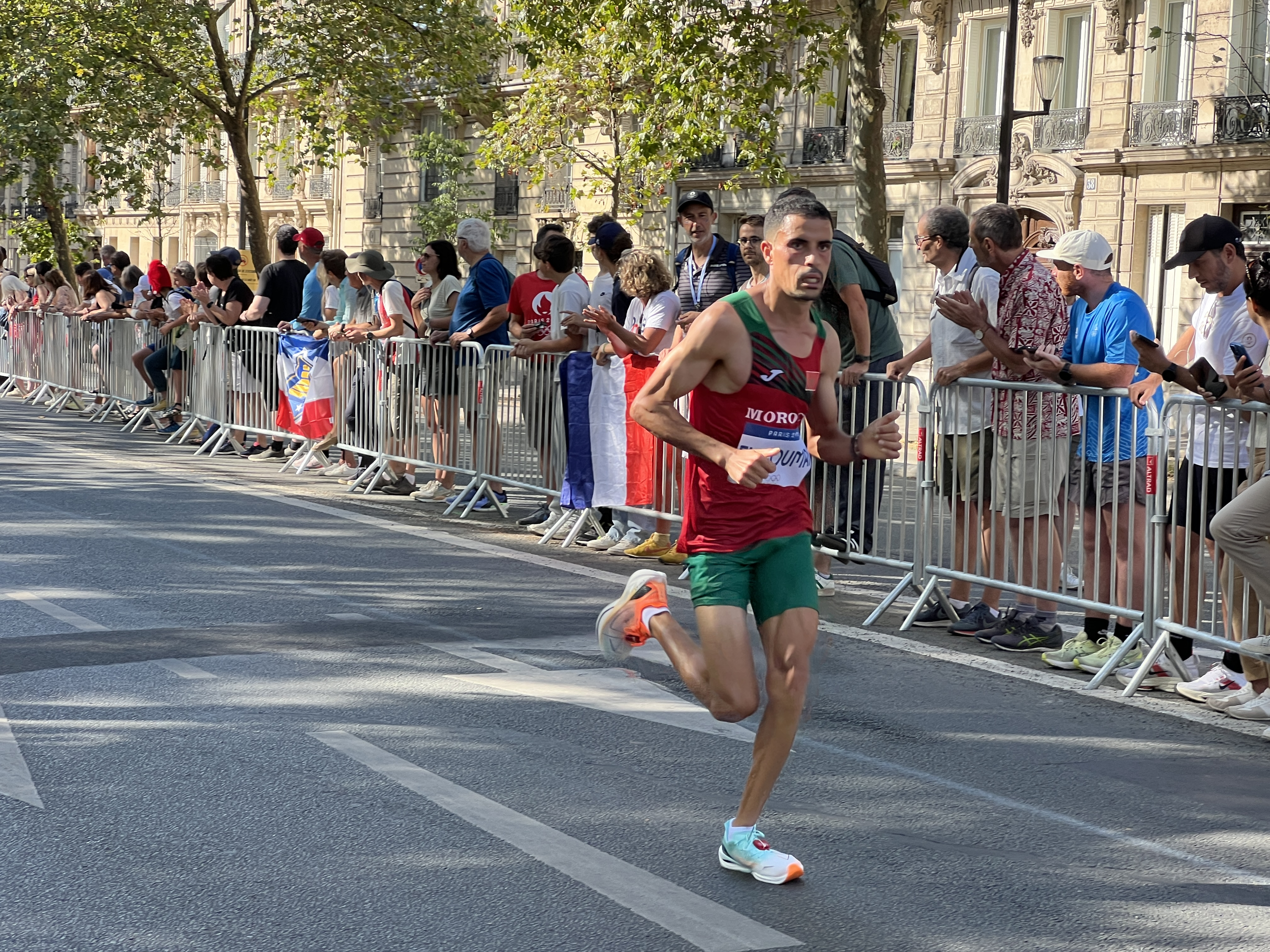
- 2024 Summer Olympics

Personal information
- Nationality: Moroccan
- Born: 28 May 1992 (age 34) Safi, Morocco

Sport
- Sport: Track and field
- Event: 5000m

Othmane El Goumri (Arabic: عثمان الكومري; born 28 May 1992) is a Moroccan long-distance runner. He represented his country at two outdoor and one indoor World Championships.

In 2016 he was banned from competition for two years due to irregularities in his biological passport. He competed in the men's marathon at the 2020 Summer Olympics. He won the 2023 Sydney marathon and dedicated his win to victims of the Al Haouz earthquake.

== International competitions ==
Year	Competition	Venue	Position	Event	Notes
Representing Morocco
2011	African Junior Championships	Gaborone, Botswana	–	5000 m	DNF
2013	Mediterranean Games	Mersin, Turkey	2nd	5000 m	13:38.24
2013	World Championships	Moscow, Russia	16th (h)	5000 m	13:31.08
2013	Jeux de la Francophonie	Nice, France	1st	5000 m	13:48.76
2013	Islamic Solidarity Games	Palembang, Indonesia	3rd	5000 m	14:07.59
2014	World Indoor Championships	Sopot, Poland	14th (h)	3000 m	7:48.83
2014	African Championships	Marrakesh, Morocco	11th	5000 m	14:12.40
2015	World Championships	Beijing, China	29th (h)	5000 m	13:58.06
2019	Rabat Marathon	Rabat, Morocco	2nd	Marathon	2:08:20
2019	Dublin Marathon	Dublin, Ireland	1st	Marathon	2:08:06
2021	Arab Championships	Radès, Tunisia	2nd	Half marathon	1:08:09
2021	Olympic Games	Sapporo, Japan	9th	Marathon	2:11:58
2022	World Championships	Eugene, United States	12th	Marathon	2:08:14
2025	World Championships	Tokyo, Japan	–	Marathon	DNF
2026	World Road Running Championships	Copenhagen, Denmark	10th	Half marathon	59:53

== Personal bests ==
Outdoor

- 1500 metres – 3:37.79 (Casablanca 2013)
- 3000 metres – 7:48.95 (Madrid 2013)
- 5000 metres – 13:13.72 (Rabat 2013)
- 10,000 metres – 28:16.76 (Rabat 2021)
- Marathon - 2:05:12 (Barcelona 2023)

Indoor

- 3000 metres – 7:44.73 (Bordeaux 2014)
