= Athletics at the 2015 African Games – Men's 5000 metres =

The men's 5000 metres event at the 2015 African Games was held on 17 September.

== Results ==
Rank	Name	Nationality	Time	Notes
1st place, gold medalist(s)	Getaneh Molla	Ethiopia	13:21.88	SB
2nd place, silver medalist(s)	Leul Gebresilase	Ethiopia	13:22.13	
3rd place, bronze medalist(s)	Thomas Longosiwa	Kenya	13:22.72	
4	Abrar Osman	Eritrea	13:23.79	
5	Victor Kimutai	Kenya	13:24.80	
6	Stephen Mokoka	South Africa	13:25.03	
7	Yasin Haje	Ethiopia	13:26.61	
8	Aron Kifle	Eritrea	13:26.85	
9	Thiery Ndikumwenayo	Burundi	13:27.38	SB
10	Teklit Teweldebrhan	Eritrea	13:55.55	
11	Hassan Bouh Ibrahim	Djibouti	13:57.13	
12	Mohamed Khalid	Sudan	14:09.17	
13	Hatusi Mthimchulu	Lesotho	14:10.19	SB
14	David Kulang	South Sudan	14:23.71	
15	Fozi Mohamed Ramadan	Djibouti	14:26.77	
16	Emmanuel Bakatukoka	DR Congo	14:39.70	
	Youssouf Hiss Bachir	Djibouti	DNF	
	Clement Kemboi	Kenya	DNF	
	Dumisane Hlaselo	South Africa	DNF	
	Olivier Irabaruta	Burundi	DNS	
	Tartitius Macaire Namsse	Central African Republic	DNS	
	Rony Ampion	Republic of the Congo	DNS	
	Steve Guelor Vedze	Republic of the Congo	DNS	
	Kabelo Lesica	Lesotho	DNS	
	Crevazio Mpami	Malawi	DNS	
	Osman Charlley	Sierra Leone	DNS	
	Ali Udou Hassan	Somalia	DNS	
	Abdalla Abdel Elmunaim	Sudan	DNS	
