= Matthew Stonier =

English athlete

Matthew Stonier l
Personal information
- Nationality: British (English)
- Born: 24 September 2001 (age 24) Sturry, Kent, England

Sport
- Sport: Athletics
- Event: 1500m
- Club: Invicta East Kent

Matthew Stonier (born 24 September 2001) is an English international athlete. He has represented England at the Commonwealth Games.

== Biography ==
Stonier was educated at The King's School, Canterbury and Loughborough University. In 2022, he won the Emsley Carr Mile before competing in the Diamond League.

In 2022, he was selected for the men's 1500 metres event at the 2022 Commonwealth Games in Birmingham. He qualified for the final at the championships and finished seventh in a time of 3:32.50.
