= 2022 African Championships in Athletics – Men's 1500 metres =

The men's 1500 metres event at the 2022 African Championships in Athletics was held on 11 and 12 June in Port Louis, Mauritius.

== Medalists ==
Gold	Silver	Bronze
Abel Kipsang; Kenya	Ryan Mphahlele; South Africa	Adehena Kasaye; Ethiopia

== Results ==
=== Heats ===
Qualification: First 4 of each heat (Q) and the next 4 fastest (q) qualified for the final.

Rank	Heat	Name	Nationality	Time	Notes
1	1	Abel Kipsang	Kenya	3:38.81	Q
2	1	Ryan Mphahlele	South Africa	3:39.33	Q
3	1	Adehena Kasaye	Ethiopia	3:40.74	Q
4	1	Abdellatif Sadiki	Morocco	3:42.31	Q
5	1	Yach Wol	South Sudan	3:42.50	q
6	1	Elias Ngeny	Kenya	3:42.69	q
7	1	Emmanuel Otim	Uganda	3:43.43	q
8	1	Youssouf Hiss Bachir	Djibouti	3:46.18	q
9	2	Kumari Taki	Kenya	3:46.24	Q
10	2	Moujahid El Hassane	Morocco	3:46.45	Q
11	2	Teddese Lemi	Ethiopia	3:46.55	Q
12	2	Hicham Ouladha	Morocco	3:47.11	Q
13	1	Riadh Chninni	Tunisia	3:47.16	
14	2	Salim Abu Mayanja	Uganda	3:47.36	
15	2	Abdullahi Jama Mohamed	Somalia	3:50.61	
16	2	Bacha Morka	Ethiopia	3:51.33	
17	1	Mohammad Dookun	Mauritius	3:52.02	
18	1	Mohamed Ali Algorni Alaa	Libya	3:54.79	
19	2	Ahmed Daher Ismail	Djibouti	3:55.33	
20	2	Djamal Abdi Dirieh	Djibouti	3:55.72	
21	2	Sylvain Azonhin	Benin	3:57.07	
22	2	Iven Moise	Seychelles	3:57.68	
23	2	Francky Mbotto	Central African Republic	4:00.70	
24	1	Edrissa Marong	Gambia	4:05.55	
25	1	Dominic Lokolong Atiol	ART	4:06.21	
	2	Alex Franck Ngouari-Mouissi	Republic of the Congo	DNS	

=== Final ===
Rank	Athlete	Nationality	Time	Notes
1st place, gold medalist(s)	Abel Kipsang	Kenya	3:36.57	
2nd place, silver medalist(s)	Ryan Mphahlele	South Africa	3:36.74	
3rd place, bronze medalist(s)	Adehena Kasaye	Ethiopia	3:38.27	
4	Kumari Taki	Kenya	3:38.31	
5	Teddese Lemi	Ethiopia	3:39.54	
6	Moujahid El Hassane	Morocco	3:39.91	
7	Hicham Ouladha	Morocco	3:40.95	
8	Abdellatif Sadiki	Morocco	3:44.42	
9	Youssouf Hiss Bachir	Djibouti	3:45.92	
10	Emmanuel Otim	Uganda	3:50.72	
11	Yach Wol	South Sudan	3:54.59	
	Elias Ngeny	Kenya	DNF	
