= Namakoe Nkhasi =

Mosotho long-distance runner

Medal record

Men's athletics

Representing Lesotho

African Championships
Bronze medal – third place	2016 Durban	10,000 m

Namakoe Nkhasi (born 10 January 1993) is a Lesotho long-distance runner who competes in distances from 5000 metres to the half marathon. He represented his country at the 2016 Summer Olympics. He was the bronze medallist in the 10,000 metres at the African Championships in Athletics in 2016. He is the Lesotho national record holder for the 5000 metres, 10000 metres and 10km road race.

Nkhasi began taking part in South African races in 2013. He took his first prominent victory there in 2016, with a win at the Two Oceans Half Marathon. He gained his first international selection for Lesotho for the 2016 African Championships in Athletics and delivered national records of 13:21.68 minutes for the 5000 m and 28:06.33 minutes for the 10,000 m. He took sixth in the 5000 m and was a bronze medallist in the 10,000 m.

He was chosen to represent Lesotho at the 2016 Summer Olympics and ran in the 5000 m heats only.

In 2017, Nkhasi won the Port Elizabeth 10km in 28:40 - a feat he repeated in 2018, when he won in 28:32. In 2017, he also won the Port Alfred Half marathon in a personal best time of 1:03:05. Nkhasi opened his 2019 season at the Gyeonggi-Do Half Marathon in South Korea, where he placed second, running 1:02:59. This was a personal best at the time.

Nkhasi's 2020 season was curtailed by the COVID-19 pandemic, but he returned in 2021 to run a half-marathon personal best of 1:02:19 at the Nelson Mandela Bay Half Marathon, in Port Elizabeth. He was 12th in the race. In 2022, Nkhasi improved to win the Nelson Mandela Bay Half Marathon in 1:01:01 - his current personal best at the distance. He was also second at the ABSA RYC Durban 10K in 27:52, also a personal best time.

== Personal bests ==
- 1500 metres – 3:49.72 min (2013)
- 5000 metres – 13:21.68 min (2016)
- 10,000 metres – 28:06.33 min (2016)
- 10K run – 27:52 min (2022)
- Half marathon – 1:01:01 min (2022)
- Marathon - 2:19:21 (2021)

All information from World Athletics profile.

== International competitions ==
Year	Competition	Venue	Position	Event	Notes
2016	African Championships	Durban, South Africa	6th	5000 m	13:21.68
2016	African Championships	Durban, South Africa	3rd	10,000 m	28:06.33
2016	Olympic Games	Rio de Janeiro, Brazil	32nd (h)	5000 m	13:41.92
2024	African Games	Accra, Ghana	4th	Half marathon	1:05:58
