= Wilfred Kimitei =

Kenyan long-distance runner

Medal record

Men's athletics

Representing Kenya

African Championships
Silver medal – second place	2016 Durban	10,000 m

Wilfred Kimeli (born 29 January 1983) is a Kenyan long-distance runner.

He won the silver medal in the 10,000 metres at the 2016 African Championships. In 2017 he broke the course record at the Karlovy Vary Half Marathon.

His personal best times are 13:12.72 minutes in the 5000 metres, achieved in June 2014 in Carquefou; 27:54.2 minutes in the 10,000 metres, achieved in May 2016 in Nairobi; and 59:40 minutes in the half marathon, achieved in February 2018 in Ras Al Khaimah.
