= Indrajeet Patel (runner) =

Indian long-distance runner

Personal information
- Nationality: Indian
- Born: 15 January 1994 (age 32) Tilikapura Soram, Allahabad, India
- Education: Guru Govind Singh Sports College, Lucknow; Dr. Ram Manohar Lohia Avadh University

Sport
- Country: India
- Event(s): 3000 metres, 5000 metres, 10,000 metres, Half marathon

Achievements and titles
- Personal best(s): 3000 m: 8:14.93 (2011); 5000 m: 14:02.8 (2014); 10,000 m: 29:41.76 (2012)

Indrajeet Patel (born 15 January 1994) is an Indian long-distance runner who competes in distances ranging from 3000 metres to the half marathon. He won the national title in the 10,000 metres in 2012. He was the 5000 metres champion at the 2014 All-India Inter-State Championships and is twice a winner at the Mumbai Half Marathon. He represented India at the 2010 Summer Youth Olympics

== Career ==
Patel hails from Allahabad, Uttar Pradesh and was an alumnus at Guru Govind Singh Sports College, Lucknow and Dr. Ram Manohar Lohia Avadh University. He set national under-20 records in the 5000 metres and competed for India in the 3000 metres finals at the 2010 Summer Youth Olympics and the 2011 World Youth Championships in Athletics. He was also the winner of the 3000 m Asian Area Qualification Championship held in Singapore on 22 and 23 May 2010, clocking 8:16:26 to beat Japan's Kazuto Nishiike. He was the Indian National Youth Champion in the 3000 metres in 2011, and the National Junior Champion in the 5000 metres in 2012.

He first came into limelight as a senior road runner after winning the Mumbai Half Marathon in 2014.

== International competitions ==
Year	Competition	Venue	Position	Event	Notes
2010	Youth Olympic Games	Bishan, Singapore	11th	3000 m	8:36.73
2011	World Youth Championships	Lille, France	9th	3000 m	8:14.00

== National titles ==
- Indian Athletics Championships
  - 10,000 m: 2012
- All-India Inter-State Championships
  - 5000 m: 2014
