= Lorenzo Dini =

Italian long-distance runner

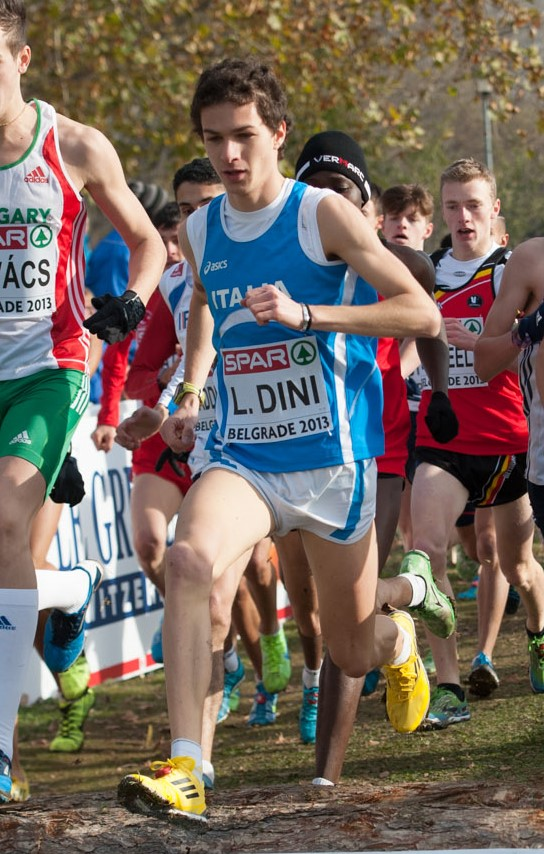
- Dini at the 2013 European Cross Country Championships.

Personal information
- Nationality: Italian
- Born: 2 October 1994 (age 32) Livorno, Italy
- Height: 1.77 m (5 ft 10 in)
- Weight: 57 kg (126 lb)

Sport
- Country: Italy
- Sport: Athletics
- Event: Long-distance running
- Club: G.S. Fiamme Gialle
- Coached by: Vittorio Di Saverio

Achievements and titles
- Personal bests: 1500 m: 3:46.89 (2015); 3000 m: 7:53.59 (2018); 5000 m: 13:40.10 (2018); 10,000 m: 28:30.01 (2018); 10 K: 29:17 (2017); Half Marathon: 1:04:26 (2018)
Medal record
European 10,000m Cup
Silver medal – second place	2017 Minsk	Team
European U20 Championships
Silver medal – second place	2013 Rieti	10,000 m

Lorenzo Dini (born 2 October 1994) is an Italian long-distance runner who competed at one edition of the IAAF World Half Marathon Championships at senior level (2018). He has a twin, also an athlete, named Samuele.

== Achievements ==
He won the national title on 10 km road in Canelli on 8 September 2019.

Year	Competition	Venue	Position	Event	Time	Notes
2012	World U20 Championships	(Spain) Barcelona	15th	5,000 m	14.22.97	PB
2013	European U20 Championships	(Italy) Rieti	2nd	10,000 m	29:31.11	PB
2013	European Cross Country Championships	(Serbia) Belgrade	5th	Junior	18.06	
2013	European Cross Country Championships	(Serbia) Belgrade	3rd	Junior team	55 pts	
2015	European Cross Country Championships	(France) Hyères	6th	U-23	23:41	
2016	European Cross Country Championships	(Italy) Chia	12th	U-23	23:18	
2016	European Cross Country Championships	(Italy) Chia	1st	U-23 team	35 pts	
2017	European Cross Country Championships	(Slovakia) Šamorín	17th	Senior	30:44	
2018	World Half Marathon Championships	(Spain) Valencia	74th	Half marathon	1:04.26	SB
2018	European 10,000m Cup	(United Kingdom) London	13th	10,000 m	28:30.01	PB
2018	Mediterranean Games	(Spain) Tarragona	6th	5000 m	13:59.25	

== National titles ==
- Italian Athletics Championships
  - 10 km road: 2019 in Canelli

== See also ==
- Italy at the 2018 European Athletics Championships
