= Karlovy Vary Half Marathon =

- Date: May
- Location: Karlovy Vary, Czech Republic
- Event type: Road
- Distance: Half marathon
- Primary sponsor: Mattoni
- Established: 2013
- Course records: Men: 1:00:54 (Kenya) Wilfred Kimitei (2017); Women: 1:08:19 (Kenya) Yvonne Morwa (2017)
- Website: Official website

The Karlovy Vary Half Marathon is an annual half marathon race which takes place in mid May in Karlovy Vary, Czech Republic. Known as the Mattoni Karlovy Vary Half Marathon, it is a part of RunCzech running circuit.

The course winds through Karlovy Vary city centre and along the Ohře river. The inaugural edition of the event was held in 2013. In 2017, almost 4 000 runners participated in the race.

The course records are held by Wilfred Kimitei and Yvonne Jelagat.

== Past winners ==
Key: Course record

| Edition | Year | Men's winner | Time (h:m:s) | Women's winner | Time (h:m:s) |
|---|---|---|---|---|---|
| 1st | 2013 | Daniel Wanjiru (KEN) | 1:03:04 | Mame Feyisa (ETH) | 1:12:49 |
| 2nd | 2014 | Teshome Mekonen (ETH) | 1:01:21 | Christelle Daunay (FRA) | 1:09:17 |
| 3rd | 2015 | Elijah Tirop (KEN) | 1:01:01 | Mulu Seboka (ETH) | 1:09:11 |
| 4th | 2016 | Abraham Kasongor (KEN) | 1:02:08 | Joyciline Jepkosgei (KEN) | 1:09:07 |
| 5th | 2017 | Wilfred Kimitei (KEN) | 1:00:54 | Yvonne Morwa (KEN) | 1:08:19 |
| 6th | 2018 | Roman Romanenko (UKR) | 1:03:58 | Eva Vrabcová-Nývltová (CZE) | 1:11:54 |
| 7th | 2019 | Yassine Rachik (ITA) | 1:02:59 | Lilia Fisikovici (MDA) | 1:12:34 |
| — | 2020 | Was not held | | | |
| — | 2021 | Was not held | | | |
| — | 2022 | Was not held | | | |
| 8th | 2023 | Vitaliy Shafar (UKR) | 1:04:53 | Aleksandra Lisowska (POL) | 1:13:24 |
| 9th | 2024 | Khalid Choukoud (NED) | 1:04:01 | Tereza Hrochová (CZE) | 1:12:29 |
