= Youssouf Hiss Bachir =

Djiboutian athlete

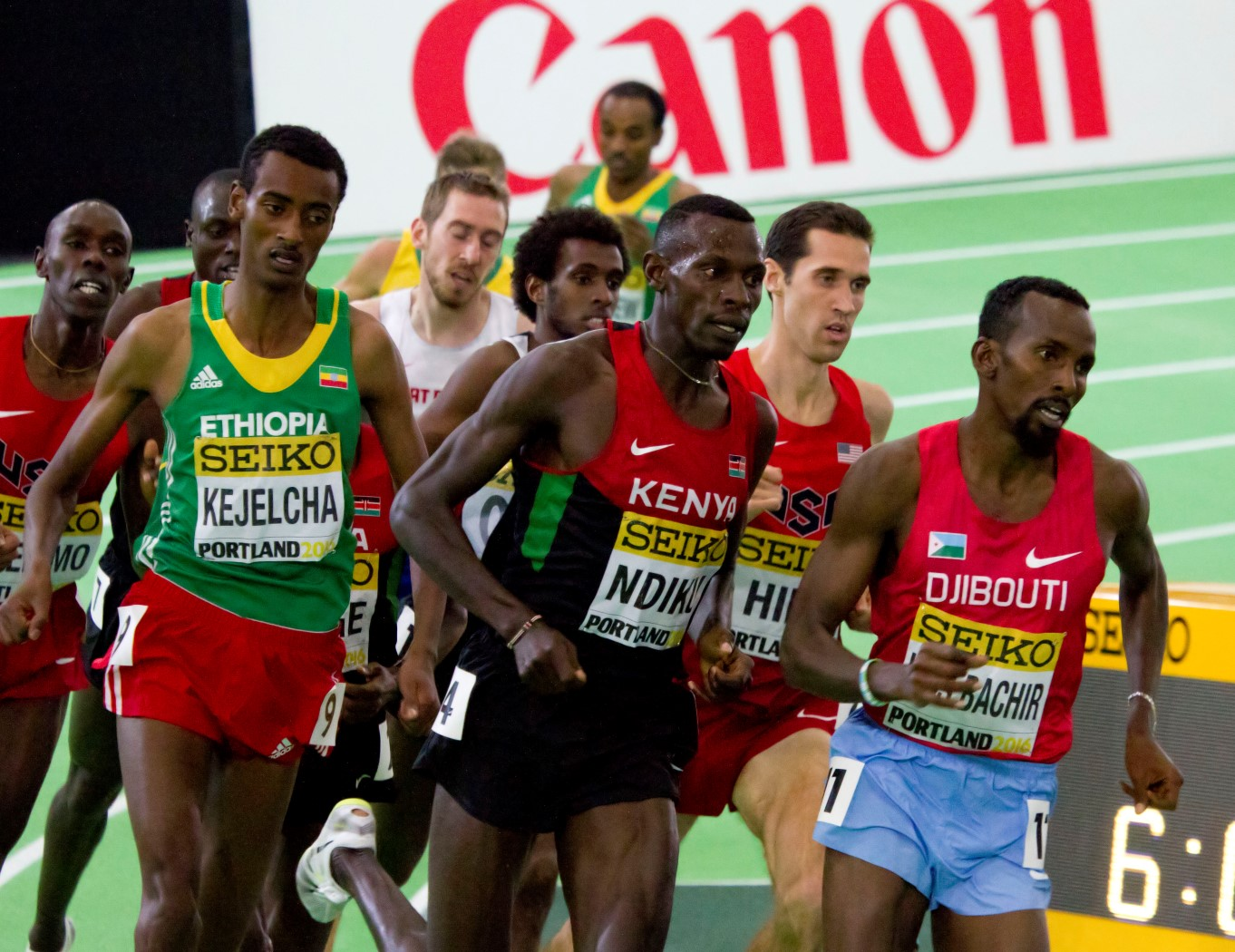
- Youssouf Hiss Bachir (right)

Personal information
- Nationality: Djiboutian
- Born: 1 January 1987 (age 38)

Sport
- Sport: Track and field
- Event(s): 1500 metres, 5000 metres

Youssouf Hiss Bachir (born 1 January 1987) is a Djiboutian middle-distance runner. He represented his country at two indoor and one outdoor World Championships.

== Competition record ==
Year	Competition	Venue	Position	Event	Notes
Representing Djibouti
2010	World Half Marathon Championships	Nanning, China	41st	Half marathon	1:05:45
2011	Pan Arab Games	Doha, Qatar	–	5000 m	DNF
2013	Arab Championships	Doha, Qatar	6th	1500 m	3:42.62
2013	Jeux de la Francophonie	Nice, France	3rd	5000 m	13:50.61
2014	World Indoor Championships	Sopot, Poland	17th (h)	3000 m	7:53.96
2015	World Championships	Beijing, China	32nd (h)	1500 m	3:44.48
2015	African Games	Brazzaville, Republic of the Congo	5th	1500 m	3:47.23
2015	African Games	Brazzaville, Republic of the Congo	–	5000 m	DNF
2016	World Indoor Championships	Portland, United States	10th	3000 m	8:08.87
2017	Jeux de la Francophonie	Abidjan, Ivory Coast	3rd	5000 m	14:11.98
2018	World Indoor Championships	Birmingham, United Kingdom	–	3000 m	DQ
2019	African Games	Rabat, Morocco	6th (h)	1500 m	3:40.04^{1}
2019	World Championships	Doha, Qatar	12th	1500 m	3:37.96
2022	African Championships	Port Louis, Mauritius	9th	1500 m	3:45.92
2022	Islamic Solidarity Games	Konya, Turkey	–	5000 m	DQ

^{1}Did not finish in the final

== Personal bests ==
Outdoor

- 1500 metres – 3:36.96 (Ninove 2015)
- 3000 metres – 7:50.96 (Karlstad 2013)
- 5000 metres – 13:28.20 (Ninove 2013)
- Half marathon – 1:05:45 (Nanning 2010)

Indoor

- 1500 metres – 3:40.61 (Sabadell 2016)
- 3000 metres – 7:43.44 (Stockholm 2016)
