= Douglas Kipserem =

Kenyan long-distance runner

Medal record

Men's athletics

Representing Kenya

African Championships
Gold medal – first place	2016 Durban	5000 m

Douglas Kipserem (born 1987) is a Kenyan long-distance runner who competes in the 5000 metres. He was the gold medallist in the event at the 2016 African Championships in Athletics.

He first appeared at the elite level in 2013, ranking in the world top 200, then placed within the top 150 in the 2014 season. A member of the Kenya Defence Forces, he was the 5000 m runner-up at the Kenyan Athletics Championships in 2016, gaining his first national selection.

== International competitions ==
Year	Competition	Venue	Position	Event	Notes
2016	African Championships	Durban, South Africa	1st	5000 m	13:13.35
