= Kota Murayama =

Japanese long-distance runner

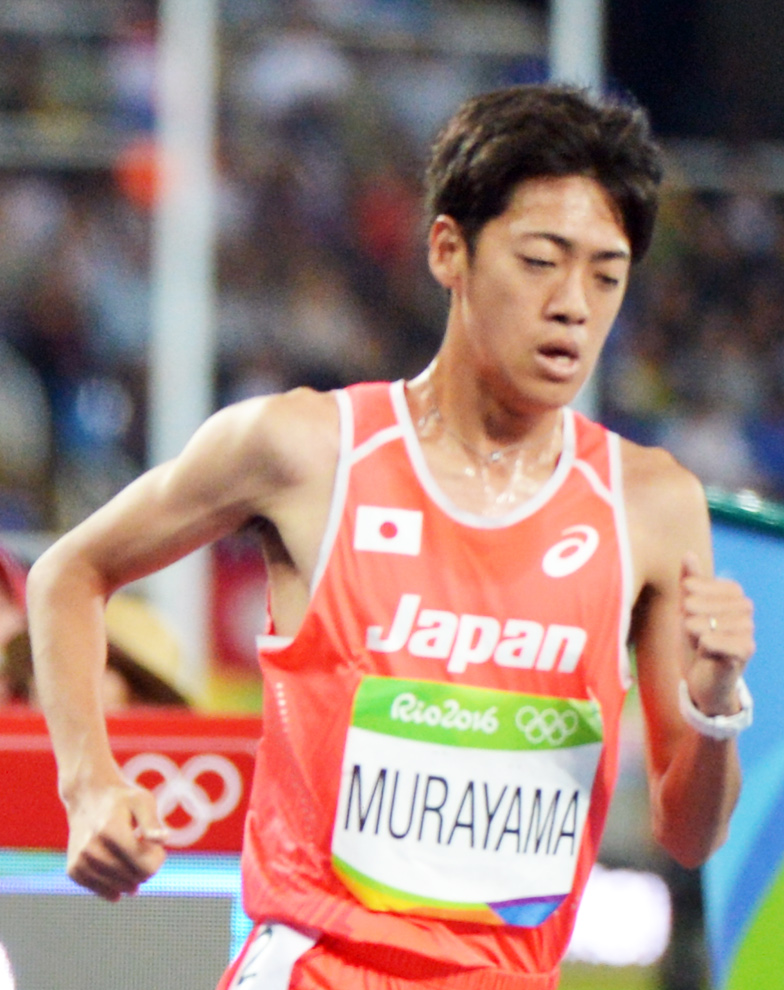
- Murayama at the 2016 Olympics

Personal information
- Born: 23 February 1993 (age 33) Miyagi Prefecture, Japan

Sport
- Country: Japan
- Sport: Track and field
- Event: 5000 metres
- College team: Josai University

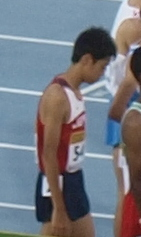
Kota Murayama at the 2012 World Junior Championships

Kota Murayama (村山 紘太, Murayama Kōta; born 23 February 1993) is a Japanese long-distance runner. He competed in the 5000 metres event at the 2015 World Championships in Athletics in Beijing, China. His twin brother, Kenta, competed in the 10,000 metres.

== International competitions ==
Year	Competition	Venue	Position	Event	Notes
2012	Asian Junior Championships	Colombo, Sri Lanka	2nd	5000 m	14:33.67
2012	World Junior Championships	Barcelona, Spain	11th	5000 m	14:18.24
2014	Asian Games	Incheon, South Korea	5th	5000 m	13:34.57
2015	World Championships	Beijing, China	32nd (h)	5000 m	14:07.11
2016	Olympic Games	Rio de Janeiro, Brazil	42nd (h)	5000 m	14:26.72
2016	Olympic Games	Rio de Janeiro, Brazil	30th	10,000 m	29:02.51

== Personal bests ==
Event	Time	Date	Place
1500 metres	3:39.56	5 September 2014	Kumagaya, Japan
5000 metres	13:19.62	9 May 2015	Marugame, Japan
10,000 metres	27:29.69	28 November 2015	Hachiōji, Japan
