= Getaneh Molla =

Ethiopian long-distance runner

Personal information
- Full name: Getaneh Tamire Molla
- Nationality: Ethiopian
- Born: 10 January 1994 (age 32)
- Height: 176 cm (5 ft 9 in)

Sport
- Sport: Track and Field
- Event: Steeplechase

Achievements and titles
- Personal bests: 1500 m: 3:44.91 (Luanda 2016); 3000 m: 7:46.06 (Stanford 2019); 3000 m steeplechase: 8:41.50 (Addis Ababa 2016); Two miles: 8:18.88 (Stanford 2019); 5000 m: 12:59.58 (Brussels 2018); 10,000 m: 27:44.61 (Hengelo 2021); 10K: 28:18 (Boulder 2018); Half marathon: 59:52 (København 2022); Marathon: 2:03:34 (Dubai 2019)
Medal record
Men's athletics
Representing Ethiopia
World Cross Country Championships
Silver medal – second place	2023 Bathurst	Senior team
African Games
Gold medal – first place	2015 Brazzaville	5000 m
African Championships
Silver medal – second place	2018 Asaba	5000 m

Getaneh Tamire Molla (born 10 January 1994) is an Ethiopian male long-distance runner who competes over distances up to 10K. He was the gold medallist in the 5000 metres at the 2015 African Games.

Geteneh's first success at national level came at the 2015 Ethiopian Athletics Championships where he won the 5000 m title. This earned him a spot on the national team for the 2015 African Games, where he became champion.

In 2016 he won both the national title at the Jan Meda Cross Country and defended his 5000 m title at the track championships. He was outside the individual medals in international competition that year, taking sixth at the 2016 African Cross Country Championships and fourth at the 2016 African Championships in Athletics. He did, however, lead the Ethiopian men's cross country team to bronze in the team event. He ended the year with a win at the Silvesterlauf Trier then opened the new year with another win at the Cross Ouest-France.

Getaneh earned his first national selection for a world event by defending his Ethiopian title at the 2017 Jan Meda Cross Country, beating Ibrahim Jeilan and Imane Merga among others.

== International competitions ==
Year	Competition	Venue	Position	Event	Notes
2015	African Games	Brazzaville, Congo	1st	5000 m	13:21.88
2016	African Cross Country Championships	Yaoundé, Cameroon	6th	Senior race	27:13
2016	African Cross Country Championships	Yaoundé, Cameroon	3rd	Senior team	41 pts
2016	African Championships	Durban, South Africa	4th	5000 m	13:17.84
2018	African Championships	Asaba, Nigeria	2nd	5000 m	13:49.06

1st at Riyadh half marathon men 21000 m

== National titles ==
- Ethiopian Athletics Championships
  - 5000 m: 2015, 2016
- Ethiopian Cross Country Championships
  - Senior race: 2016, 2017

== Circuit wins ==
- Silvesterlauf Trier: 2016
- Cross Ouest-France: 2017

== See also ==
- List of African Games medalists in athletics (men)
