= Adehena Kasaye =

Ethiopian long-distance runner

Personal information
- Nationality: Ethiopian
- Born: September 13, 2003 (age 22)

Sport
- Country: Ethiopia
- Sport: Athletics
- Event(s): Middle-distance running, Cross Country running

Achievements and titles
- Personal best(s): 1500 m: 3:36.38 (Salbodel, 2022); Mile: 3:55.50 (Copenhagen, 2024); 3000m: 7:49.13 (Torún, 2022); 5000m: 13:58.59 (Doha, 2025)
Medal record
Men's athletics
Representing Ethiopia
African Championships
Bronze medal – third place	2022 Saint Pierre	1500 m
World Cross Country Championships
Silver medal – second place	2023 Bathurst	Mixed relay
Silver medal – second place	2024 Belgrade	Mixed relay

Adehena Kasaye (born 13 September 2003) is an Ethiopian middle-distance and cross country runner. He was a silver medalist in the mixed team relay at the 2023 and 2024 World Athletics Cross Country Championships, and a bronze medalist over 1500 metres at the 2022 African Championships.

== Career ==
In 2022, Kasaye became Ethiopian champion over 1500 metres, running 3:51.00 in Hawassa. In June 2022, he was a bronze medalist over 1500 metres at the 2022 African Championships in Mauritius, finishing behind Abel Kipsang, but just in front of another Kenyan, Kumari Taki, by four hundredths of a second to win the bronze. In August, he was a finalist at the 2022 World Athletics U20 Championships in Cali, Colombia, in the 1500m race, placing fourth overall.

He was a silver medalist in the mixed team relay at the 2023 World Athletics Cross Country Championships in Bathurst, Australia, alongside Birke Haylom, Getnet Wale and Hawi Abera.

He was a silver medalist again at the 2024 World Athletics Cross Country Championships in Belgrade, in the mixed team relay. This came despite the fact during baton exchange he accidentally stepped on the foot or his teammate, Birri Abera, and she had to run her leg of the race with only one shoe on.

He finished fourteenth over 5000 metres on 16 May at the 2025 Doha Diamond League.
