= Caleb Ndiku =

Kenyan runner

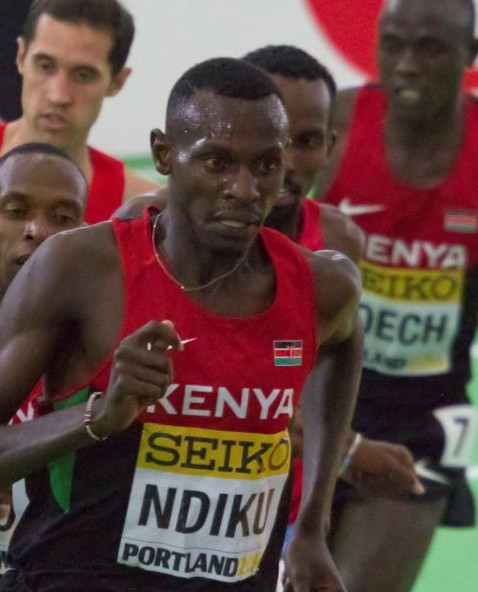

Medal record

Men's athletics

Representing Kenya

World Championships
Silver medal – second place	2015 Beijing	5000 m

World Indoor Championships
Gold medal – first place	2014 Sopot	3000 m

All-Africa Games
Gold medal – first place	2011 Maputo	1500 m

African Championships
Gold medal – first place	2012 Porto-Novo	1500 m
Gold medal – first place	2014 Marrakesh	5000 m

Commonwealth Games
Gold medal – first place	2014 Glasgow	5000 m

Representing Africa

Continental Cup
Gold medal – first place	2014 Marrakesh	3000 m

Caleb Mwangangi Ndiku (born 9 October 1992 in Machakos) is a Kenyan middle- and long-distance runner.

== Career ==
Born in Machakos, he was the son of a javelin thrower, David Ndiku, but he decided not to follow his father and focused on running instead. He began his career in domestic cross country running competitions and at the Athletics Kenya series meeting in Meru, he took fifth place in the junior men's race at the age of sixteen. He won selection for the 2009 World Youth Championships in Athletics with a personal best run in the 1500 metres at the Kenyan youth trials. At the championships in Brixen, he ran 3:38.42 to win the silver medal behind compatriot Gideon Kiage Mageka. Ndiku returned to the Kenyan cross country circuit at the end of the year, and finished fourth at another Athletics Kenya series race in Nairobi.

Ndiku earned himself a place on the Kenyan junior men's team for the 2010 IAAF World Cross Country Championships with a third-place finish in the junior race at the Kenya National Cross Country Championships. In the world junior men's race in Bydgoszcz the following month, he formed part of the leading pack before quickening the pace to establish a significant lead. He won the junior title and also headed the Kenyan runners to the team gold as the country grabbed the top four spots. Ndiku took his second title of the year at the 2010 World Junior Championships in Athletics, where he ran a personal best of 3:37.30 minutes to win the 1500 m world junior crown. He won the Most Promising Kenyan Sportsman of the Year award at the end that December.

In 2011 he started his technical collaboration with the Italian coach Renato Canova, who planned for him a strategy looking at 5000m.

He began competing in senior competitions the following year and was runner-up at the Trofeo Alasport cross country in March, second only to the newly elected world champion Imane Merga.

In 2014 he had an impressive season, winning everything possible : World Indoor Championships in 3000m, Commonwealth Games (27 July) in 5000m, African Championships (14 August) in 5000m, the Diamond League in 5000m (with two victories in Eugene and Zurich), and the Continental Cup in 3000m (14 September), becoming the number one of 5000m for the ranking of Track and Field.

== Competition record ==
Year	Competition	Venue	Position	Event	Notes
Representing Kenya
2009	World Youth Championships	Brixen, Italy	2nd	1500 m	3:38.42
2010	World Cross Country Championships	Bydgoszcz, Poland	1st	Junior race	Individual
2010	World Cross Country Championships	Bydgoszcz, Poland	1st	Junior race	Team
2010	World Junior Championships	Moncton, Canada	1st	1500 m	3:37.30
2011	All-Africa Games	Maputo, Mozambique	1st	1500 m	3:39.12
2012	African Championships	Porto-Novo, Benin	1st	1500 m	3:35.71
2014	World Indoor Championships	Sopot, Poland	1st	3000 m	7:54.94
2014	Commonwealth Games	Glasgow, United Kingdom	1st	5000 m	13:12.07
2014	African Championships	Marrakesh, Morocco	1st	5000 m	13:34.27
2014	Continental Cup	Marrakesh, Morocco	1st	3000 m	7:52.64^{1}
2015	World Championships	Beijing, China	2nd	5000 m	13:51.75
2016	World Indoor Championships	Portland, United States	5th	3000 m	7:58.81
2016	Olympic Games	Rio de Janeiro, Brazil	18th (h)	5000 m	13:26.63

^{1}Representing Africa
