= Elroy Gelant =

South African long-distance runner

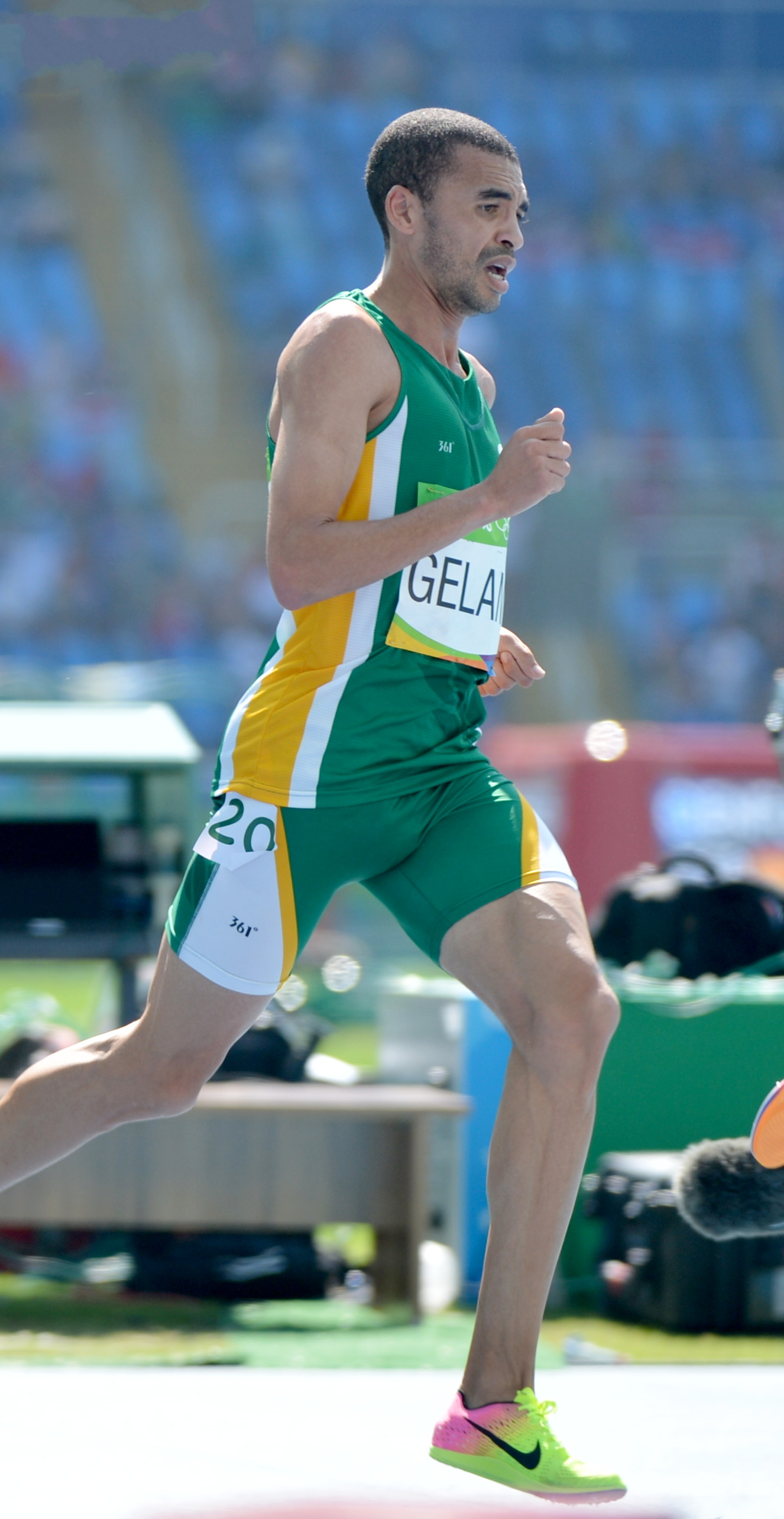
- Gelant at the 2016 Olympics

Personal information
- Nationality: South African
- Born: 25 August 1986 (age 40)
- Height: 1.75 m (5 ft 9 in)
- Weight: 61 kg (134 lb)

Sport
- Sport: Athletics
- Event: 800 m – half marathon

Achievements and titles
- Personal bests: 800 m – 1:47.74 (2008); 1500 m – 3:37.97 (2015); 3000 m – 7:41.38 (2012); 3000 m(i) - 7:48.64 (2012) NR; 5000 m – 13:04.88 (2016) NR; 10,000 m – 27:41.30 (2013); HM – 1:00:22 (2025); Mar – 2:05:36 (2025)
Medal record
Men's athletics
Representing South Africa
African Championships
Silver medal – second place	2016 Durban	5000 m

Elroy Gelant (born 25 August 1986) is a South African athlete competing primarily in the long-distance events. He finished 12th at the 2012 Indoor and 2013 Outdoor World Championships.

He competed in the men's marathon at the 2020 Summer Olympics.

In April 2025, he broke the 26-year South African marathon record, with a time of 2 hours, 5 minutes and 36 seconds in the Hamburg marathon.

== Competition record ==
Year	Competition	Venue	Position	Event	Notes
Representing South Africa
2009	Universiade	Belgrade, Serbia	3rd	5000 m	14:07.97
2011	World Championships	Daegu, South Korea	20th (q)	5000 m	13:48.33
2012	World Indoor Championships	Istanbul, Turkey	12th	3000 m	7:48.64
2012	African Championships	Porto-Novo, Benin	7th	5000 m	13:54.93
2013	World Championships	Moscow, Russia	12th	5000 m	13:43.68
2014	World Indoor Championships	Sopot, Poland	7th	3000 m	7:57.31
2014	African Championships	Marrakesh, Morocco	9th	5000 m	14:00.48
2016	African Championships	Durban, South Africa	2nd	5000 m	13:15.13
2016	Olympic Games	Rio de Janeiro, Brazil	13th	5000 m	13:17.47
2018	World Half Marathon Championships	Valencia, Spain	41st	Half marathon	1:02:52
2018	African Championships	Asaba, Nigeria	15th	5000 m	14:20.37
2018	African Championships	Asaba, Nigeria	9th	10,000 m	30:23.35
2021	Olympic Games	Sapporo, Japan	34th	Marathon	2:16:43
2022	African Championships	Port Louis, Mauritius	8th	10,000 m	29:41.40
2024	Olympic Games	Paris, France	11th	Marathon	2:09:07
2025	World Championships	Tokyo, Japan	33rd	Marathon	2:16:32
