= 2016 African Championships in Athletics – Men's 5000 metres =

The men's 5000 metres event at the 2016 African Championships in Athletics was held on 26 June in Kings Park Stadium.

== Results ==
Rank	Athlete	Nationality	Time	Notes
1st place, gold medalist(s)	Douglas Kipserem	Kenya	13:13.35	
2nd place, silver medalist(s)	Elroy Gelant	South Africa	13:15.13	
3rd place, bronze medalist(s)	Mangata Kimai Ndiwa	Kenya	13:16.85	
4	Getaneh Molla	Ethiopia	13:17.84	
5	Peter Lagat	Kenya	13:18.78	
6	Namakwe Nkhasi	Lesotho	13:21.68	NR
7	Thierry Ndikumwenayo	Burundi	13:26.24	
8	Jean-Marie Vianney Niyomukiza	Burundi	13:31.91	
9	Phillip Kipyeko	Uganda	13:32.77	
10	Dejene Debla	Ethiopia	13:33.06	
11	Abdallah Kibet Mande	Uganda	13:34.52	
12	Onesphore Nzikwikunda	Burundi	13:34.54	
13	Teklit Teweldebrhan	Eritrea	13:36.00	
14	Sesebo Matlapeng	Botswana	13:43.57	
15	David Kulang	South Sudan	13:54.69	NR
16	Khalid Hamed	Sudan	14:20.24	
17	John Atem	South Sudan	14:20.40	
18	Bakatukonka Emanuel	Democratic Republic of the Congo	14:41.52	
19	Tendai Zimuto	Zimbabwe	14:51.80	
20	Yach Wol	South Sudan	14:52.73	
21	Carnisious Wenjere	Zimbabwe	16:12.55	
	Stephanus Kaudinge	Namibia	DNS	
	Jauodo Jauodo	Mozambique	DNS	
	Daud Mohamed Abubakar	Somalia	DNS	
	Selemon Barega	Ethiopia	DNS	
	Mohamed Bante	Sudan	DNS	
	Mohamed Firsa Enyem	Sudan	DNS	
	Melusi Sihlongonyane	Swaziland	DNS	
