= Ryan Mphahlele =

South African long-distance runner

Personal information
- Born: 20 June 1998 (age 28)

Sport
- Country: South Africa
- Sport: Long-distance running

Achievements and titles
- Personal bests: 800 m: 1:49.05 (Bloemfontein 2022); 1500 m: 3:32.90 (Cape Town 2023); Mile: 3:54.48 (Dublin 2023); 3000 m: 7:53.96 (Hilversum 2018); 5000 m: 14:13.09 (Cape Town 2022); 10km: 28:46 (Durban 2018)
Medal record
Men's athletics
Representing South Africa
African Championships
Silver medal – second place	2022 Port Louis	1500 m

Ryan Mphahlele (born 20 June 1998) is a South African middle and long-distance runner.

In 2017, he competed in the junior men's race at the 2017 IAAF World Cross Country Championships held in Kampala, Uganda.

In 2019, he competed in the senior men's race at the 2019 IAAF World Cross Country Championships held in Aarhus, Denmark. He finished in 70th place.
