= Abrar Osman =

Eritrean long-distance runner

Abrar Osman Adem
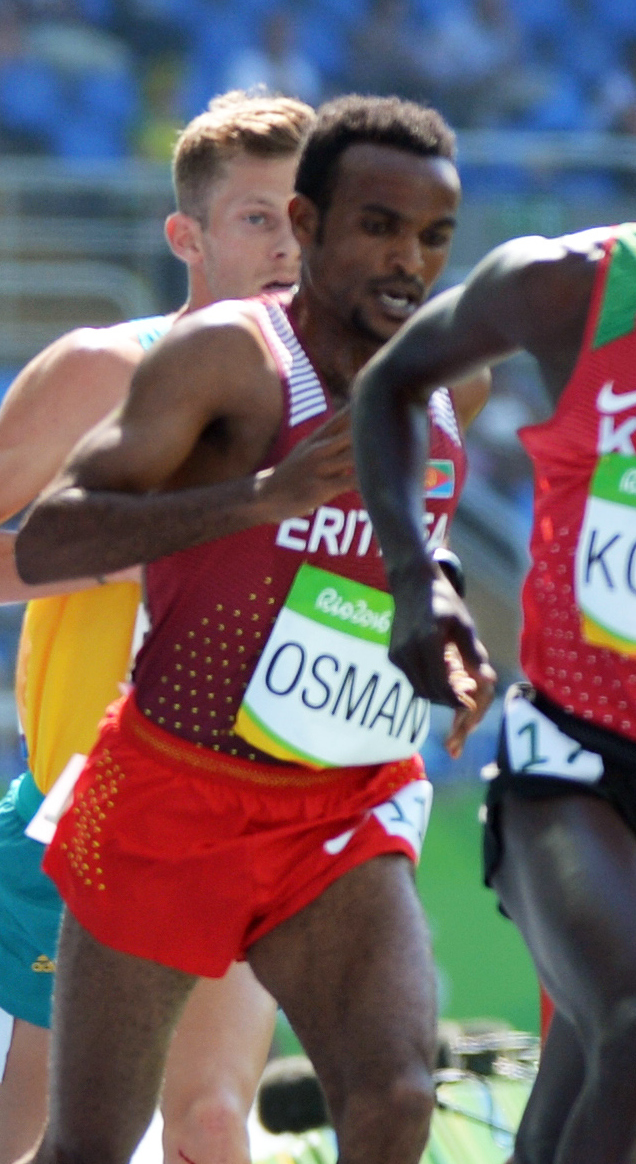
- Osman at the 2016 Olympics

Personal information
- Born: 1 January 1994 (age 32) Adi Shumakele, Debub, Eritrea
- Height: 168 cm (5 ft 6 in)
- Weight: 58 kg (128 lb)

Sport
- Sport: Track and field
- Event: 3000 m – half marathon

Achievements and titles
- Personal bests: 3000 m – 7:39.70 (2013); 5000 m – 13:14.00 (2015); 10,000 m – 27:41.69 (2015); 10 km – 28:05 (2014); 15 km – 42:19 (2016); 20 km – 57:37 (2016); HM – 1:00:39 (2015)
Medal record
Men's athletics
Representing Eritrea
African Championships
Bronze medal – third place	2014 Marrakesh	5000 m

Abrar Osman Adem (born 1 January 1994) is an Eritrean long-distance runner. At the 2012 Summer Olympics, he competed in the 5000 metres, finishing 11th overall in Round 1 and failing to qualify for the final.

== International competitions ==
Year	Competition	Venue	Position	Event	Notes
Representing Eritrea
2010	Youth Olympic Games	Singapore	1st	3000 m	8:07.24
2011	African Junior Championships	Gaborone, Botswana	–	5000 m	DNF
2011	World Youth Championships	Lille, France	3rd	5000 m	7:40.89
2012	World Junior Championships	Barcelona, Spain	2nd	5000 m	13:40.52
2012	Olympic Games	London, United Kingdom	11th (h)	5000 m	13:24.40
2014	African Championships	Marrakesh, Morocco	3rd	5000 m	13:36.42
2014	Continental Cup	Marrakesh, Morocco	6th	3000 m	8:01.20^{1}
2015	World Championships	Beijing, China	21st (h)	5000 m	13:45.55
2015	World Championships	Beijing, China	6th	10,000 m	27:43.21
2015	African Games	Brazzaville, Republic of the Congo	4th	5000 m	13:23.79
2016	World Half Marathon Championships	Cardiff, United Kingdom	7th	Half marathon	1:00:58
2016	Olympic Games	Rio de Janeiro, Brazil	10th	5000 m	13:09.56

^{1}Representing Africa
