= Phillip Kipyeko =

Ugandan long-distance runner

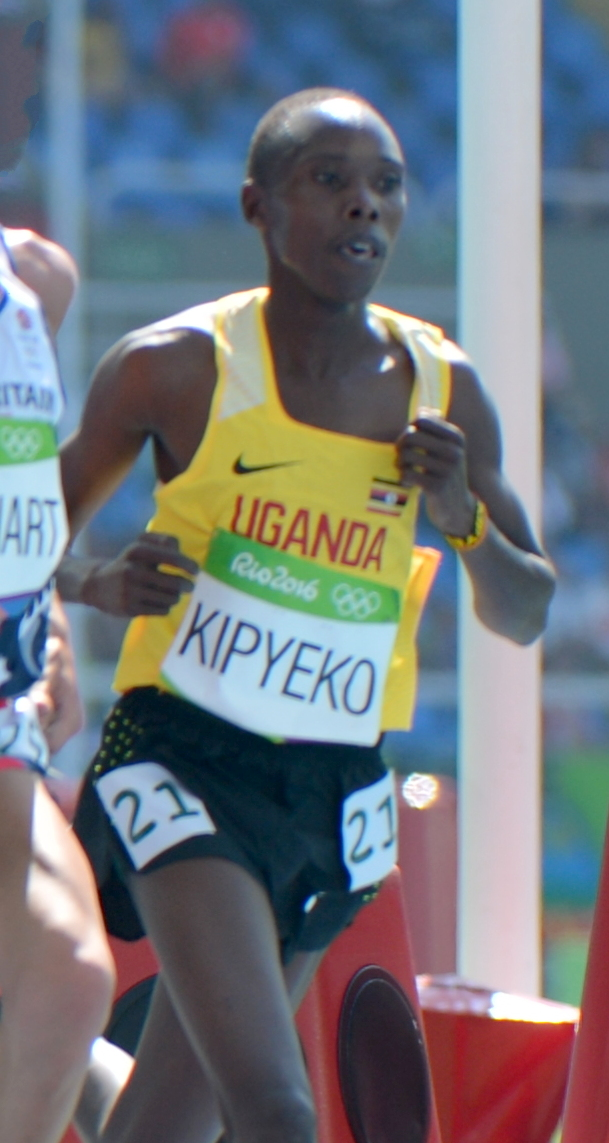
- Kipyeko at the 2016 Olympics

Personal information
- Born: 1 January 1995 (age 31)

Sport
- Sport: Athletics
- Event: 1500–10,000 m

Achievements and titles
- Personal bests: 1500 m – 3:45.00 (2013); 3000 m – 7:44.14 (2014); 5000 m – 13:10.69 (2015); 10 km – 28:18 (2013)

Phillip Kipyeko (born 1 January 1995) is a Ugandan long-distance runner competing primarily in the 5000 metres. He represented his country at the 2013 and 2015 World Championships in Athletics missing the final on both occasions.

== International competitions ==
Year	Competition	Venue	Position	Event	Notes
Representing Uganda
2011	World Youth Championships	Lille, France	7th	3000 m	8:11.12
2011	Commonwealth Youth Games	Douglas, Isle of Man	3rd	3000 m	8:02.33
2012	World Junior Championships	Barcelona, Spain	6th	5000 m	13:45.52
2013	World Championships	Moscow, Russia	19th (h)	5000 m	13:33.68
2014	World Junior Championships	Eugene, United States	6th	5000 m	13:40.55
2015	World Championships	Beijing, China	12th (h)	5000 m	13:26.20
2016	African Championships	Durban, South Africa	10th	5000 m	13:33.06
2016	Olympic Games	Rio de Janeiro, Brazil	12th (h)	5000 m	13:24.66
2018	Commonwealth Games	Gold Coast, Australia	6th	5000 m	13:59.59

== Personal bests ==
Outdoor

- 1500 metres – 3:45.00 (Kampala 2013)
- 3000 metres – 7:44.14 (Hengelo 2014)
- 5000 metres – 13:10.69 (Heusden-Zolder 2015)
- 10 kilometres – 28:18 (Makutano 2013)
