= Hagos Gebrhiwet =

Ethiopian long-distance runner (born 1994)

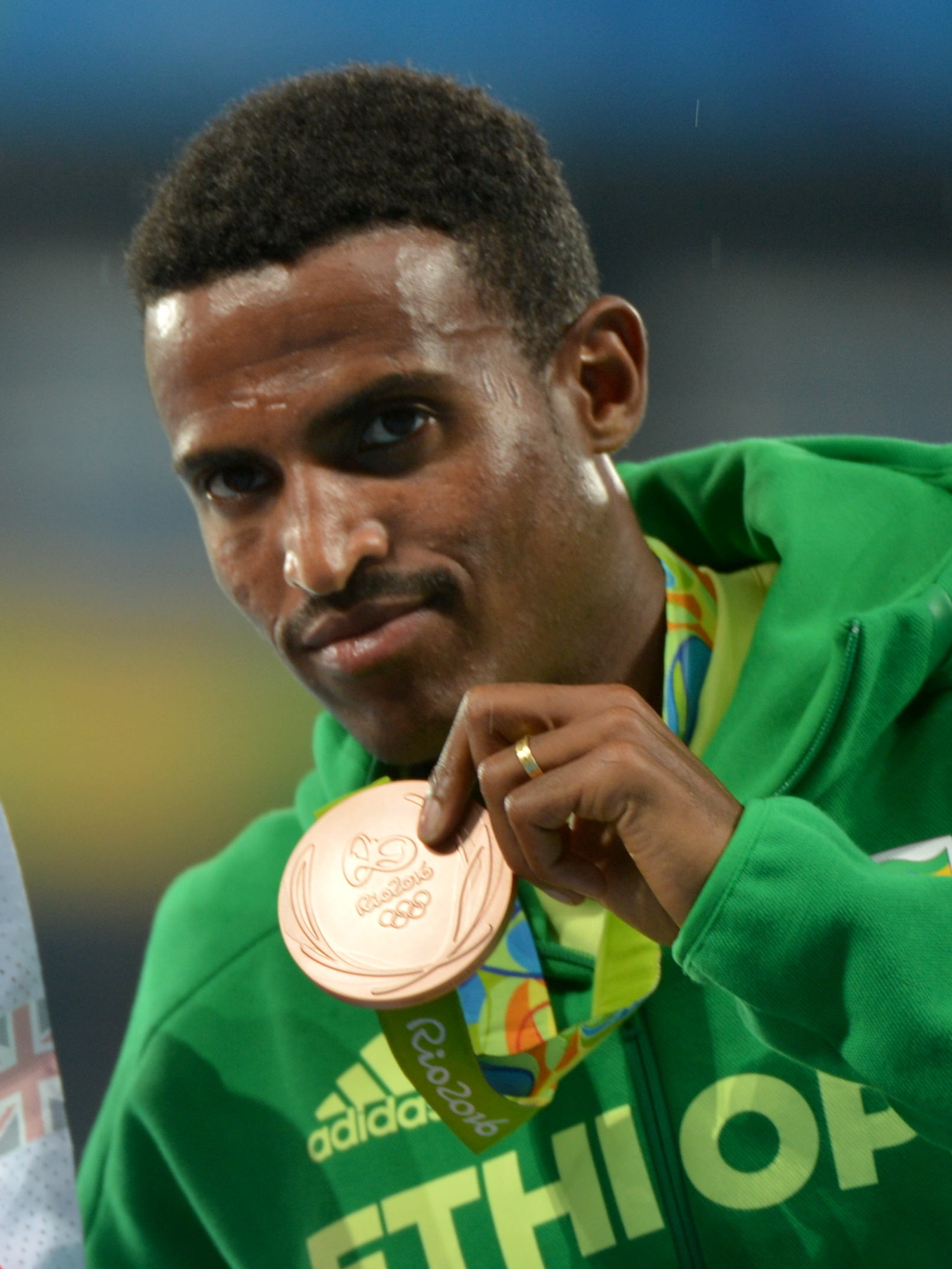
- Gebrhiwet at the 2016 Olympics

Personal information
- Full name: Hagos Gebrhiwet Berhe
- Nationality: Ethiopian
- Born: 11 May 1994 (age 32) Ts'a'ida Imba, Tigray Region, Ethiopia
- Height: 1.71 m (5 ft 7 in)
- Weight: 56 kg (123 lb)

Sport
- Country: Ethiopia
- Sport: Long-distance running
- Club: Mesfin Industrial Engineering
- Coached by: Hussein Shibo; Yilma Berta (national); Kasshu Gebre-egziabher

Achievements and titles
- Personal bests: 3000 m: 7:30.36 (Doha 2013); 5000 m: 12:36.73 NR (Oslo 2024); 10,000 m: 26:48.95 (Hengelo 2019); Half marathon: 57:41 (Valencia 2023)
Medal record
Representing Ethiopia
Olympic Games
Bronze medal – third place	2016 Rio de Janeiro	5000 m
World Championships
Silver medal – second place	2013 Moscow	5000 m
Bronze medal – third place	2015 Beijing	5000 m
World Road Running Championships
Gold medal – first place	2023 Riga	5K
World Indoor Tour
Winner	2018	3000 m
World Cross Country Championships
Gold medal – first place	2013 Bydgoszcz	Junior Race
African Games
Gold medal – first place	2023 Accra	5000 m

Hagos Gebrhiwet Berhe (Tigrinya: ሓጎስ ገብረሂወት, born 11 May 1994) is an Ethiopian long-distance runner. He won the bronze medal in the 5,000 m at the 2016 Summer Olympics. He won the gold medal in the 5 km at the 2023 World Road Running Championships. He has also won silver and bronze medals at the World Athletics Championships.

Hagos is the second-fastest man of all time in the 5,000 metres. A successful junior, he won gold in the junior race at the 2013 World Cross Country Championships.

== Early life ==
Born in Ts'a'ida Imba, Tigray Region, Ethiopia. he took up running seriously in 2010. He came sixth in the 5,000 metres at the 2011 Ethiopian National Championships and was selected to run the 3,000 metres at that year's World Youth Championships, where he finished fifth with a time of 7:45.11 minutes. Hagos noted that his first national selection had helped him develop his running and he went on to win the junior title at the Ethiopian Club's Cross Country, competing for Mesfin Engineering.

== Career ==
=== 2011-2013: Early career and Junior 5 km road record ===
Hagos had his first major win in 2011, when he took the title at the San Silvestre Vallecana 10 km race in Spain. He defeated Spain's top distance runners and also edged Eritrea's Teklemariam Medhin at the line in a personal best time of 27:57 minutes.

Hagos came fourth in the junior section of the 2012 African Cross Country Championships. He made his debut on American soil at the Boston Indoor Games, taking fourth place in a best of 7:44.08 minutes for the 3000 m. Still 17 years old, he was runner-up to World medallist Dejen Gebremeskel at the Carlsbad 5,000 on 1 April 2012. His time of 13:14 minutes was the fastest 5K road time ever for a junior athlete. He entered his first 5,000 m Diamond League event at the Shanghai Golden Grand Prix in May and upset the field by winning in wet conditions, setting a meet record time of 13:11.00 minutes and beating athletes including Kenenisa Bekele and Augustine Choge. He performed well on the major circuit, coming runner-up at the Bislett Games, then setting a 5,000 m world junior record of 12:47.53 minutes as runner-up at the Meeting Areva. This would stand as the world junior record until Selemon Barega broke it in 2018. He was selected for the Ethiopian Olympic team and came eleventh in the 5000 m Olympic final. He ended the year with a win at the Great Ethiopian Run in Addis Ababa.

In February 2013, Hagos set a new junior world record in the 3000 m by winning the New Balance Indoor Grand Prix, beating Dejen Gebremeskel and Galen Rupp with a time of 7:32.87. In March 2013 he won the junior world cross country title in Bydgoszcz, Poland. At the 2013 World Championships in Moscow, Hagos won the silver medal in the 5,000 m. He leaned at the finish line to beat Kenyan Isaiah Koech, and both were timed at 13:27.26. In March 2014, Hagos finished fifth in the 3,000 m at the 2014 IAAF World Indoor Championships in a time of 7:56.34.

=== 2015-2016: World and Olympic bronze medals ===
Hagos opened his 2015 season with a fourth-placed finish at the World Cross Country Championships in Guiyang. On 15 May, Hagos held off Mo Farah to win the 3,000 m at the Doha Diamond League, running a time of 7:38.08. At the World Championships in Beijing, Hagos won bronze over 5,000 m.

At the 2016 Summer Olympics, Hagos won the bronze medal in the 5,000 m.

=== 2017-2019: Ethiopian 10,000 m title ===
In August 2018, Hagos set a new personal best of 12:45.82 over 5,000 m in finishing second behind Selemon Barega at the 2018 Diamond League Final. He followed it up by winning his second Great Ethiopian Run title in November.

Hagos set a new 10,000 m personal best of 26:48.95 at the 2019 Ethiopian 10,000 m Trials in Hengelo. At that year's World Championships in Doha, Hagos finished eighth in the 10,000 m.

=== 2023-present: 5,000 m Ethiopian record, first global senior title and Second Olympics ===
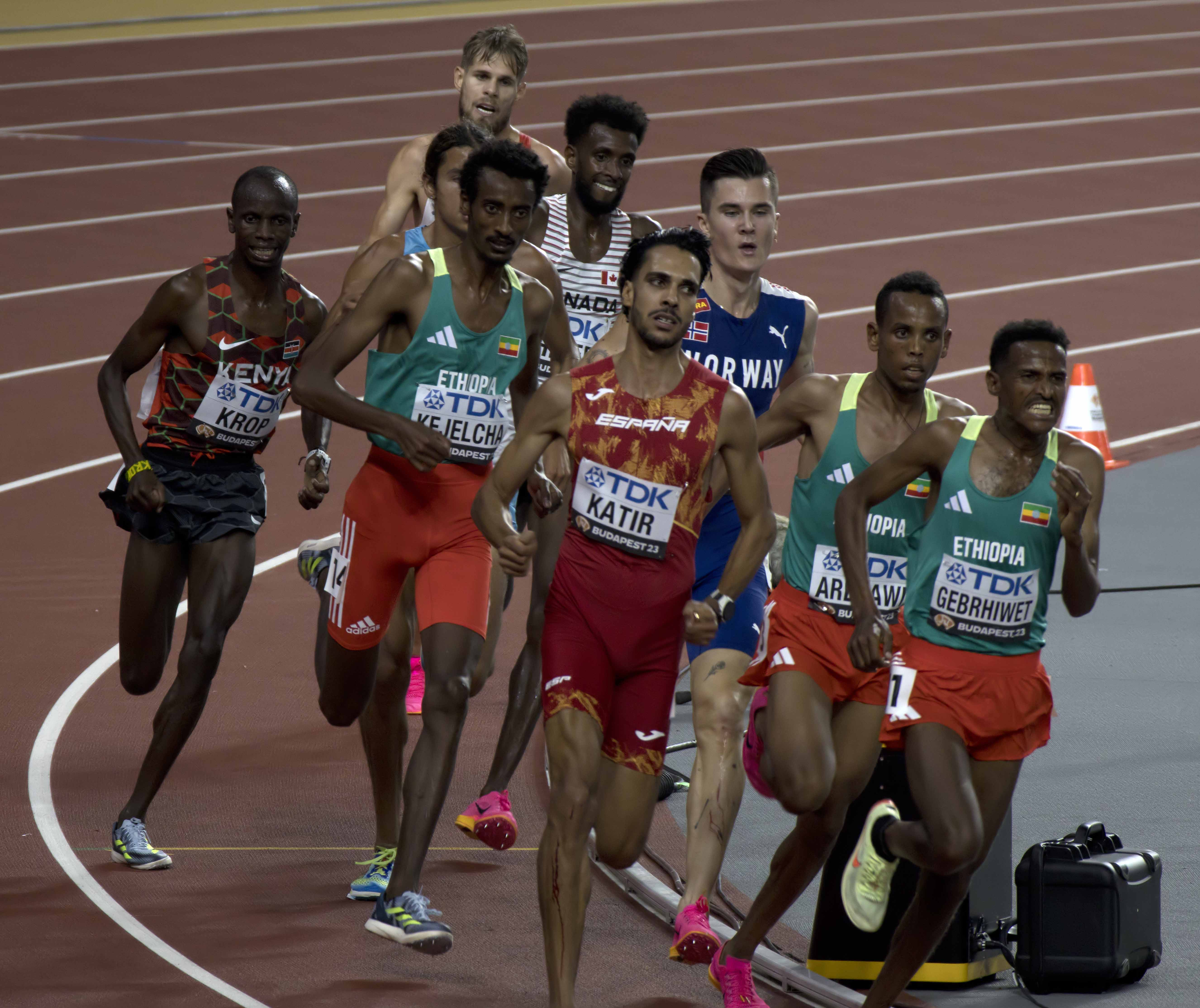
Hagos competing in the 5,000 m at the 2023 World Championships.

On June 30, 2023, Gebrhiwet ran 12:49.80 for third place in the 5000 m at the Lausanne Diamond League. By doing this, he became the first athlete to run sub-12:50 over 10 years apart, as his first time under 12:50 was his former world junior record in 2012. Hagos would later solidify this form at the Monaco Diamond League on July 23, where he ran 12:42.18 for both the victory and a personal best. At the World Championships in Budapest, Hagos finished sixth in the 5,000 m. At the inaugural World Road Running Championships in Riga, Hagos won his first senior global title in the road 5 km.

He improved his personal best at the 2024 Bislett Games with a time of 12:36.73, the second fastest in history over 5000 m and a new Ethiopian national record, breaking Kenenisa Bekele's former record of 12:37.35. At the 2024 Olympics in Paris, Hagos placed fifth in the 5,000 m in a time of 13:15.32. At the Diamond League Final in Brussels, Hagos finished second behind Berihu Aregawi, running a time of 12:44.25.

In December 2024, it was announced that he had signed up for the inaugural season of the Michael Johnson founded Grand Slam Track. At the first slam in Kingston, Hagos finished second overall behind Grant Fisher.

== Statistics ==
=== Circuit performances ===
Grand Slam Track results
Slam	Race group	Event	Pl.	Time	Prize money
2025 Kingston Slam	Long distance	5000 m	4th	14:40.20	US$50,000
2025 Kingston Slam	Long distance	3000 m	1st	7:51.55	US$50,000

=== Major competition record ===
Year	Competition	Venue	Position	Event	Notes
2024	2024 Olympic Games	Paris, France	5th	5000 m	13:15.32
2024	2024 African Games	Accra, Ghana	1st	5000 m	13:38.12
2023	2023 World Athletics Championships	Budapest, Hungary	6th	5000 m	13:12.65
2019	2019 World Athletics Championships	Doha, Qatar	8th	10,000 m	27:11.37
2018	World Indoor Championships	Birmingham, England	4th	3000 m	8:15.76
2016	2016 Olympic Games	Rio de Janeiro, Brazil	3rd	5000 m	13:04.35
2015	2015 World Championships in Athletics	Beijing, China	3rd	5000 m	13:51.86
2015	2015 IAAF Diamond League	Doha, Qatar	1st	3000 m	7:38.08
2014	2014 IAAF World Indoor Championships	Sopot, Poland	5th	3000 m	7:56.34
2013	2013 World Championships in Athletics	Moscow, Russia	2nd	5000 m	13:27.26
2013	2013 IAAF World Cross Country Championships	Bydgoszcz, Poland	1st	8 km	21:04
2012	2012 IAAF Diamond League	Paris, France	2nd	5000 m	12:47.53 WJR
2011	World Youth Championships	Lille, France	5th	3000 m	7:45.11
