= Isiah Koech =

Kenyan long-distance runner (born 1993)

Isiah Kiplangat Koech
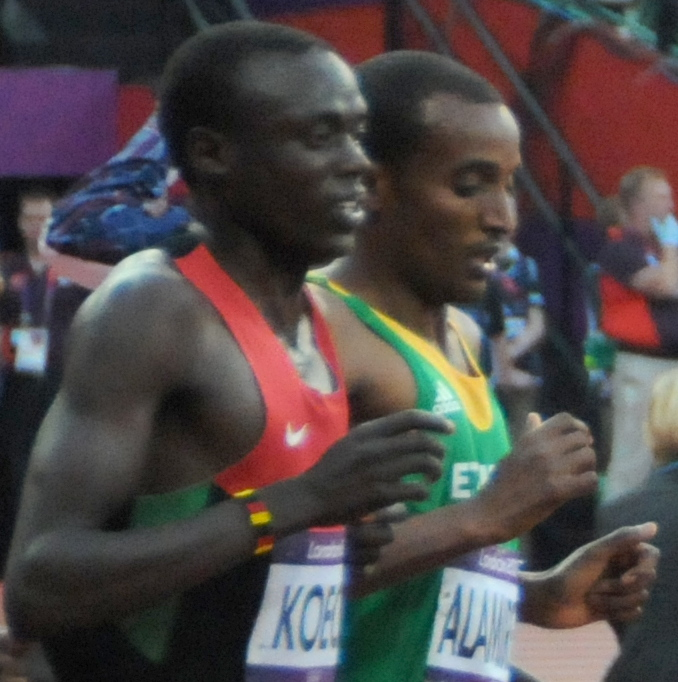
- Koech (left) at the 2012 Summer Olympics

Personal information
- Nationality: Kenyan
- Born: 19 December 1993 (age 32) Kericho, Kenya

Sport
- Sport: Running
- Events: 3000 metres, 5000 metres

Achievements and titles
- Personal bests: 3000 m: 7:32.43 m (Doha 2012) 5000 m: 12:48.64 m (Paris 2012) Indoor 5000 m: 12:53.29 m (Düsseldorf 2011)
Medal record
Men's athletics
Representing Kenya
World Championships
| Bronze medal – third place | 2013 Moscow | 5000 m |
African Championships
| Silver medal – second place | 2014 Marrakesh | 5000 m |
World Youth Championships
| Gold medal – first place | 2009 Brixen | 3000 m |

Isiah Kiplangat Koech (born 19 December 1993) is a Kenyan long-distance runner who specialises in the 5000 metres.

== Career ==
At the 2009 World Youth Championships in Athletics in Brixen, Italy, Koech won a gold medal over 3000 metres, setting a new world youth leading time with 7:51.51.

He also took part in the 2010 IAAF World Cross Country Championships in Bydgoszcz, Poland, finishing fourth in the junior men's race.

On 11 February 2011, Koech became just the fourth man to run the 5000 m indoor under 13 minutes when he clinched victory in 12 min 53.29 sec at the PSD Bank Meeting in Düsseldorf. He then ran a world junior indoor best for the 3000 m at the Indoor Flanders Meeting a few days later, running a time of 7:37.50 minutes Koech controlled the junior race at the Kenyan Cross Country Championships and took first place, earning a spot for the Junior World Cross.

Despite being a provisional favourite for the junior race at the 2011 IAAF World Cross Country Championships, he ended the race in tenth place. However, he did help Kenya to the team title alongside Geoffrey Kipsang and Patrick Mutunga Mwikya. Moving into the senior ranks, he ran over 5000 m at the 2011 World Championships in Athletics and closely finished behind the medallists to place fourth overall. In December, he returned to cross country and won the Lotto Cross Cup Brussels by a margin of over half a minute.

At the 2012 Kenyan Olympic trials he ran the fastest ever 5000 m time in Kenya to win the race and guarantee his first Olympic selection.

== Personal bests ==
| Distance | Time | venue |
|---|---|---|
| 3000 m | 7:32.43 | Doha, Qatar (11 May 2012) |
| 5000 m | 12:48.64 | Paris, France (6 July 2012) 400 m 1:30.20 ( parris) 6 July 2021 |
