= 20K run =

Running competition over 20 kilometres

Athletics 20K run

World records
- Men: Jacob Kiplimo 53:42+ (2025)
- Women: Letesenbet Gidey 59:35 (2021)

The 20K run (20 kilometres, or approximately 12.4 miles) is a long distance foot race. It is a rarely held race that is not recognized as an Olympic event. The event held IAAF world championship status in 2006 only, when the existing IAAF World Half Marathon Championships briefly hosted the shorter distance.

The world best for men is held by Zersenay Tadese of Eritrea who ran a time of 56:01 at the 2006 IAAF World Road Running Championships in Debrecen, Hungary. The women's world best is held by Florence Kiplagat of Kenya who ran a time of 1:01:54 at the 2015 Barcelona Half Marathon in Barcelona, Spain. IAAF records require the 20 km distance to be run on a course without a significant drop in elevation between the start and finish points and where the birds-eye distance between the start of finish points is less than ten kilometres. The Association of Road Racing Statisticians has an additional criteria in that it requires records to be set in competitions of the given distance, thus it does not recognise Kiplagat's run due to it being recorded en route to a longer distance. The ARRS-recognised world record is 1:03:21 by Lornah Kiplagat of the Netherlands, who also recorded her time at the 2006 World Championships.

== Road races ==
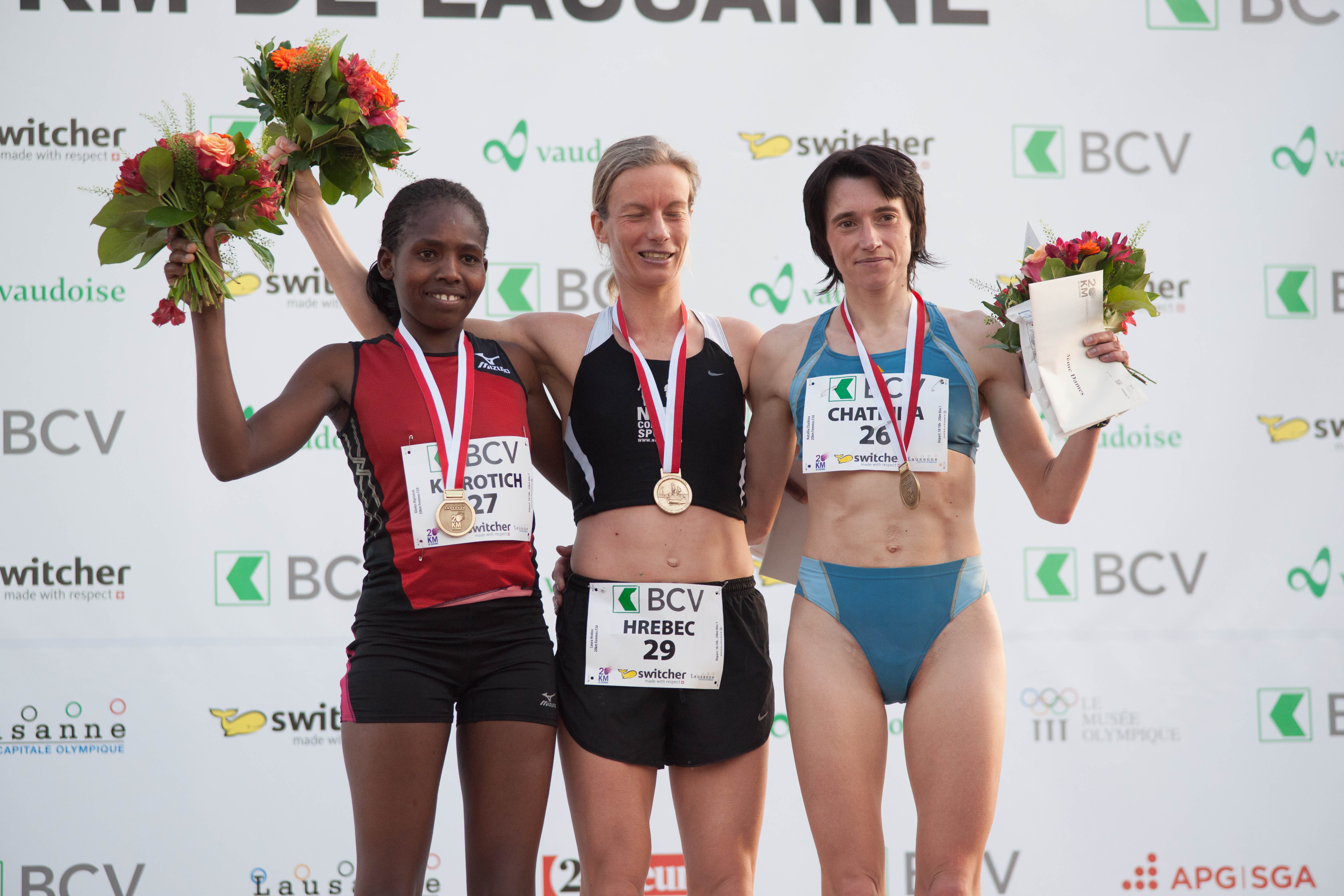
The 2012 women's podium from the 20 km of Lausanne, Switzerland.

There are several annual road running competitions over the 20 km distance, mostly based in Western Europe, the United States, and Japan.

Europe

- 20 van Alphen
- 20 km of Brussels
- 20 Kilomètres de Paris
- 20 km of Tours
- 20 km of Lausanne
- 20 km of Maroilles
- Behobia-San Sebastián
- Friedeslauf 20 km
- Marseille-Cassis Classique Internationale
- Zilveren Molenloop

Japan

- Hakone Ekiden Yosenkai
- Takashimadaira 20 km

United States

- New Haven Road Race
- John F Kennedy Memorial 20 km
- Vestal XX
- Penn Relays 20 km

The Kanaguri Hai Tamana Half Marathon, Dam to Dam Half Marathon and Ogden Newspapers Classic Half Marathon were all previously 20 km races for much of their history.

== All-time top 25 ==
- + = en route to longer performance
- Mx = mixed gender race
- Wo = women only race

=== Men ===
- Correct as of October 2026

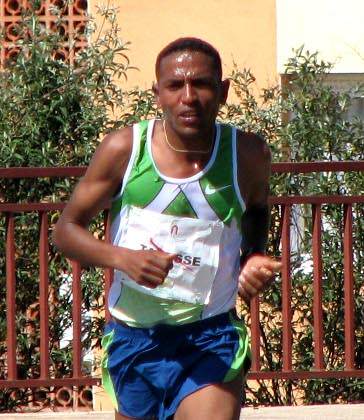
Men's world best holder (without en route performances) Zersenay Tadese

Rank	Time	Athlete	Nation	Date	Race	Location	Ref.
1	53:42+	Jacob Kiplimo	Uganda	16 February 2025	Barcelona Half Marathon	Barcelona	
2	54:02+	Yomif Kejelcha	Ethiopia	23 August 2026	21K Buenos Aires	Buenos Aires	
3	54:36+	Kibiwott Kandie	Kenya	22 October 2023	Valencia Half Marathon	Valencia	
3	54:36+	Hagos Gebrhiwet	Ethiopia	22 October 2023	Valencia Half Marathon	Valencia	
5	54:42+	Selemon Barega	Ethiopia	22 October 2023	Valencia Half Marathon	Valencia	
6	54:50+	Rhonex Kipruto	Kenya	6 December 2020	Valencia Half Marathon	Valencia	
7	54:57+	Alexander Mutiso	Kenya	6 December 2020	Valencia Half Marathon	Valencia	
8	55:00+	Geoffrey Kamworor	Kenya	15 September 2019	Copenhagen Half Marathon	Copenhagen	
9	55:03+	Nicholas Kimeli	Kenya	8 March 2026	Lisbon Half Marathon	Lisbon	
10	55:04+	Abel Kipchumba	Kenya	24 October 2021	Valencia Half Marathon	Valencia	
11	55:07+	Philemon Kiplimo	Kenya	6 December 2020	Valencia Half Marathon	Valencia	
12	55:11+	Daniel Mateiko	Kenya	27 October 2024	Valencia Half Marathon	Valencia	
12	55:11+	Isaia Kipkoech Lasoi	Kenya	27 October 2024	Valencia Half Marathon	Valencia	
14	55:12+	Rodrigue Kwizera	Spain	25 October 2026	Valencia Half Marathon	Valencia	
15	55:13+	Sabastian Sawe	Ethiopia	15 September 2024	Copenhagen Half Marathon	Copenhagen	
16	55:14+	Kennedy Kimutai	Kenya	24 October 2021	Valencia Half Marathon	Valencia	
17	55:18+	Abraham Kiptum	Kenya	28 October 2018	Valencia Half Marathon	Valencia	
18	55:20+	Andreas Almgren	Sweden	20 September 2026	World Road Running Championships	Copenhagen	
18	55:20+	Joshua Cheptegei	Uganda	20 September 2026	World Road Running Championships	Copenhagen	
20	55:21+	Zersenay Tadese	Eritrea	21 March 2010	Lisbon Half Marathon	Lisbon,	
21	55:22+	Birhanu Balew	Bahrain	14 February 2026	Ras Al Khaimah Half Marathon	Ras Al Khaimah	
22	55:24+	Mathew Kimeli	Kenya	24 October 2021	Valencia Half Marathon	Valencia	
23	55:26+	Rodgers Kwemoi	Kenya	19 February 2022	Ras Al Khaimah Half Marathon	Ras al-Khaimah	
23	55:26+	Vincent Langat	Kenya	14 September 2025	Copenhagen Half Marathon	Copenhagen	
25	55:30+	Jemal Yimer Mekonnen	Ethiopia	28 October 2018	Valencia Half Marathon	Valencia	

==== Notes ====
Below is a list of other times equal or superior to 55:30:

- Jacob Kiplimo also ran 54:23+ (2026), 54:29+ (2021), 54:42+ (2020), 54:53+ (2022) and 55:13+ (2024).
- Yomif Kejelcha also ran 54:32+ (2024), 54:38+ (2023).
- Kibiwott Kandie also ran 54:43+ (Note: by official result source, 54:42 by World Athletics source) (2022), 55:08+ (2022).
- Hagos Gebrhiwet also ran 55:02+ (2026).
- Rhonex Kipruto also ran 55:04+ (2021).
- Isaia Kipkoech Lasoi also ran 55:13+ (2024).
- Geoffrey Kamworor also ran 55:13+ (2026).
- Daniel Mateiko also ran 55:17+ (2021).
- Sabastian Sawe also ran 55:17+ (2023).
- Philemon Kiplimo also ran 55:19+ (2021).
- Nicholas Kimeli also ran 55:20+ (2026) and 55:27+ (2025).

=== Women ===
- Updated September 2026

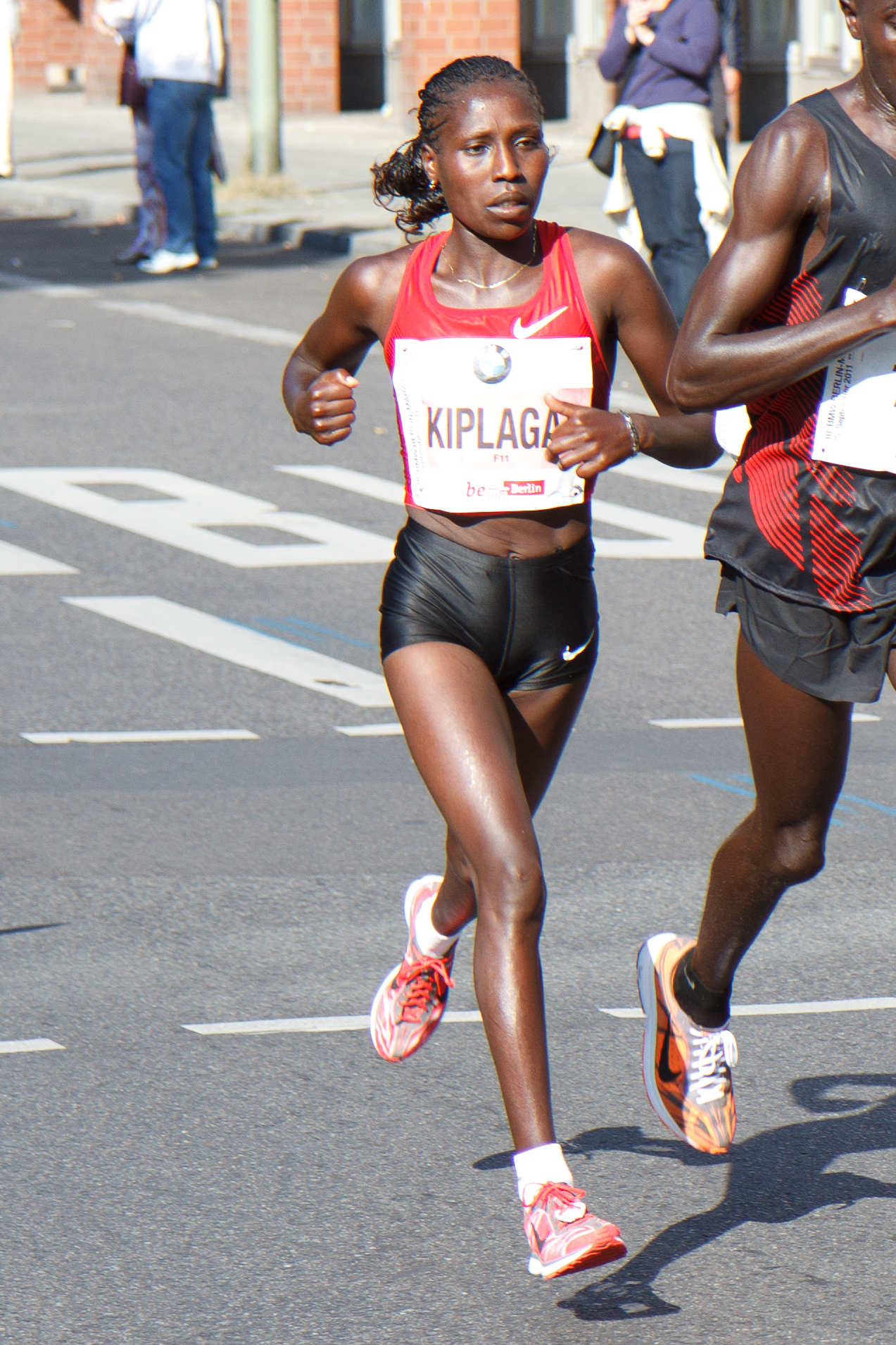
Florence Kiplagat

Rank	Time	Athlete	Nation	Date	Race	Location	Ref.
1	59:35+ Mx	Letesenbet Gidey	Ethiopia	24 October 2021	Valencia Half Marathon	Valencia	
2	59:42 Mx	Agnes Ngetich	Kenya	27 October 2024	Valencia Half Marathon	Valencia	
3	59:56 Mx	Fotyen Tesfay	Ethiopia	27 October 2024	Valencia Half Marathon	Valencia	
4	1:00:09 Mx	Lilian Kasait	Kenya	27 October 2024	Valencia Half Marathon	Valencia	
5	1:00:24+ Mx	Yalemzerf Yehualaw	Ethiopia	24 October 2021	Valencia Half Marathon	Valencia	
6	1:00:41 Mx	Ejgayehu Taye	Ethiopia	27 October 2024	Valencia Half Marathon	Valencia	
7	1:00:42+ Mx	Loice Chemnung	Kenya	15 February 2026	Barcelona Half Marathon	Barcelona	
8	1:00:43+ Mx	Ruth Chepng'etich	Kenya	4 April 2021	Istanbul Half Marathon	Istanbul	
9	1:01:03+ Mx	Joyciline Jepkosgei	Kenya	11 February 2024	Barcelona Half Marathon	Barcelona	
10	1:01:04+ Mx	Girmawit Gebrzihair	Ethiopia	19 February 2022	Ras Al Khaimah Half Marathon	Ras al-Khaimah	
10	1:01:04+ Mx	Hellen Obiri	Kenya	19 February 2022	Ras Al Khaimah Half Marathon	Ras al-Khaimah	
12	1:01:11+ Mx	Ababel Yeshaneh	Ethiopia	21 February 2020	Ras Al Khaimah Half Marathon	Ras Al Khaimah	
13	1:01:16+ Mx	Sheila Chepkirui	Kenya	19 February 2022	Ras Al Khaimah Half Marathon	Ras Al Khaimah	
14	1:01:18+ Mx	Sutume Kebede	Ethiopia	14 January 2024	Houston Half Marathon	Houston	
14	1:01:18+ Mx	Senbere Teferi	Ethiopia	11 February 2024	Barcelona Half Marathon	Barcelona	
16	1:01:19+	Irine Jepchumba Kimais	Kenya	19 February 2023	Barcelona Half Marathon	Barcelona	
17	1:01:20+ a	Brigid Kosgei	Kenya	8 September 2019	Great North Run	Newcastle-South Shields	
18	1:01:21+ Mx	Likina Amebaw	Ethiopia	14 September 2025	Copenhagen Half Marathon	Copenhagen	
19	1:01:23+ Mx	Tsigie Gebreselama	Ethiopia	8 March 2026	Lisbon Half Marathon	Lisbon	
20	1:01:27+ Mx	Margaret Kipkemboi	Kenya	22 October 2023	Valencia Half Marathon	Valencia	
21	1:01:28+ Mx	Irene Chepet Cheptai	Kenya	22 October 2023	Valencia Half Marathon	Valencia	
22	1:01:35+ Mx	Sharon Lokedi	Ethiopia	14 September 2025	Copenhagen Half Marathon	Copenhagen	
23	1:01:41+ Mx	Joan Chelimo	Kenya	4 April 2021	Istanbul Half Marathon	Istanbul	
24	1:01:42+ Mx	Janeth Chepngetich	Kenya	22 October 2023	Valencia Half Marathon	Valencia	
24	1:01:42+ Mx	Nevin Can	Turkey	23 August 2026	21K Buenos Aires	Buenos Aires	

==== Notes ====
Below is a list of other times equal or superior to 1:01:42::

- Fotyen Tesfay also ran 1:00:42+ Mx (2026).
- Yalemzerf Yehualaw also ran 1:01:05+ Mx (2021).
- Hellen Obiri also ran 1:01:18+ Mx (2021).
- Joyciline Jepkosgei also ran 1:01:22+ Mx (2023), 1:01:25+ Mx (2017), 1:01.28+ (2017).
- Sheila Chepkirui also ran 1:01:26+ Mx (2021).
- Brigid Kosgei also ran 1:01:29+ (2020).
- Margaret Kipkemboi also ran 1:01:42+ Mx (2024).
