= Isaia Kipkoech Lasoi =

Kenyan long-distance runner

Personal information
- Born: 12 October 1999 (age 27)

Sport
- Country: Kenya
- Sport: Long-distance running
- Event: Half Marathon

Achievements and titles
- Personal bests: Half Marathon: 58:10 (Copenhagen 2024); Marathon: 2:04:57 (Amsterdam 2026)

Isaia Kipkoech Lasoi (born 12 October 1999) is a Kenyan long-distance runner.

== Career ==
In 2023, Lasoi won the Zwolle Half Marathon and placed second in the Venloop half marathon.

In 2024, Lasoi repeated as champion at the Zwolle Half Marathon as well as claiming bronze at the Ras Al Khaimah Half Marathon, the Berlin Half Marathon, the Copenhagen Half Marathon, and the Valencia Half Marathon.

In 2025, he reclaimed bronze at the Ras Al Khaimah Half Marathon and Copenhagen Half Marathon as well as entering the Prague Half Marathon and Boston Athletic Association Half Marathon for the first time and claiming silver and gold at each respectively.

In 2026, he opened his year placing 2nd in the Guadalajara Half Marathon and followed that up by winning the Antrim Coast Half Marathon. He made his marathon debut at the 2026 Amsterdam Marathon placing 8th and running a time of 2:04:57.
