= Half marathon =

Road running event of 21.0975 kilometres

Athletics Half marathon
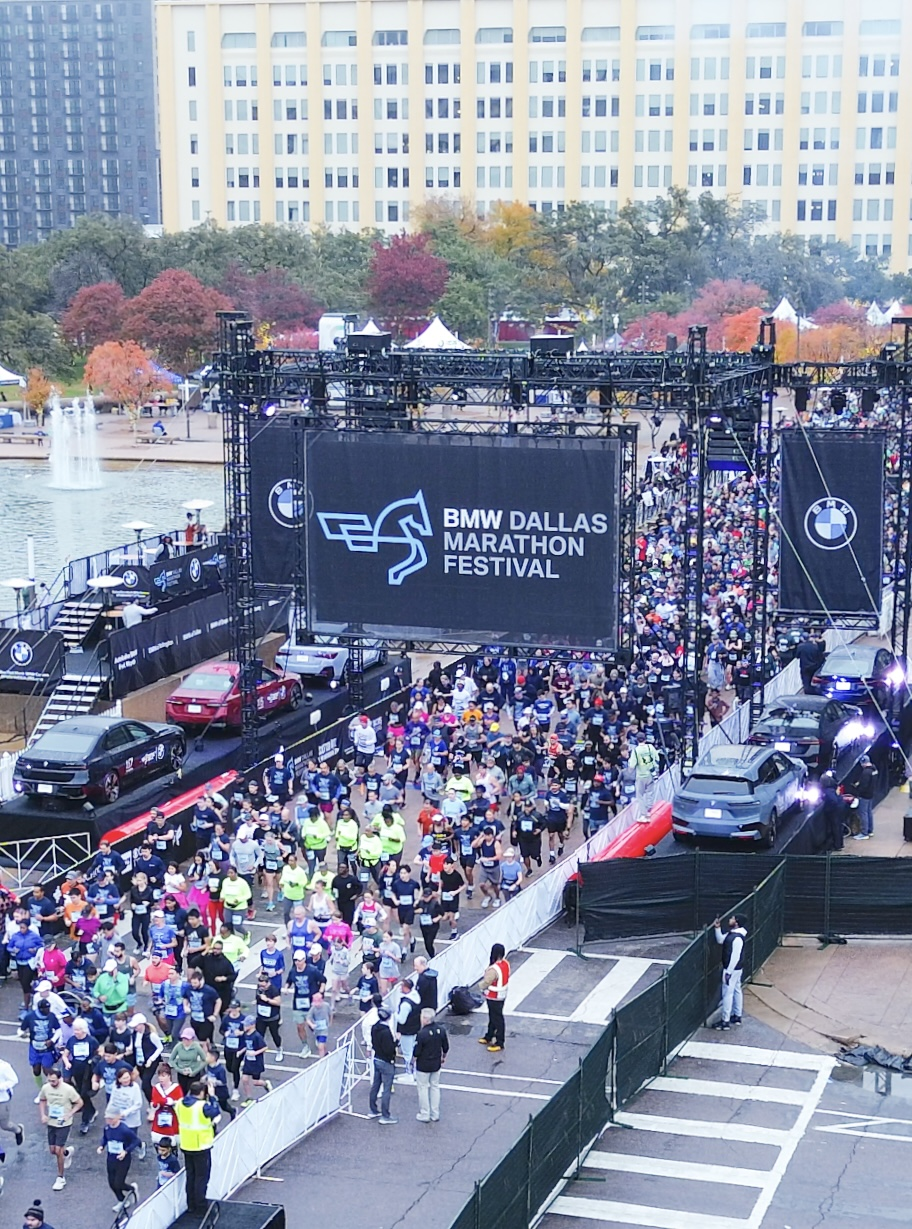
- Half marathon runners in the 2024 Dallas Marathon

World records
- Men: Yomif Kejelcha (ETH) 56:51 (2026)
- Women: Mx: Letesenbet Gidey (ETH) 1:02:52 (2021); Wo: Agnes Jebet Ngetich (KEN) 1:05:15 (2026)

A half marathon is a road running event of 21.0975 kilometres (c. 13 mi 192.5 yd)—half the distance of a marathon. It is common for a half marathon event to be held concurrently with a marathon or a 5K race, using almost the same course with a late start, an early finish, or shortcuts. If finisher medals are awarded, the medal or ribbon may differ from those for the full marathon. The half marathon is also known by its rounded distance: a 21K, a 21.1K, or 13.1 miles.

A half marathon world record is officially recognised by World Athletics. The men's world record time is 56:51, set by Yomif Kejelcha in 2026 in Buenos Aires. Jacob Kiplimo ran 56:42 in Barcelona in 2025, but this mark was not ratified by World Athletics due to his proximity to the lead car. The women's world record, in a mixed-gender race, is 1:02:52, set by Letesenbet Gidey of Ethiopia in October 2021 in Valencia, Spain. The world record for the women's only race is 1:05:15, set by Agnes Jebet Ngetich of Kenya in September 2026.

Participation in half marathons has grown steadily since 2003, partly because it is a challenging distance, but does not require the same level of training that a marathon does. In 2008, Running USA reported that the half marathon was the fastest-growing type of race.

== History ==
Races close to the official half marathon distance of 21.0975 km (13.1094 mi) have taken place throughout the early 20th century, and athletes have also been timed at the midpoint of full marathons. The 1946 Central American and Caribbean Games in Barranquilla, Colombia featured a road race that is listed at exactly the modern half marathon distance, referred to as the "Carrera Centroamericana y del Caribe: (21 kms. 97,5 metros)". The 1952 South American Championships in Athletics in Buenos Aires, Argentina featured a road race that was 21.097km, referred to as "la media maratón" ('the half marathon') by the Chilean newspaper La Nación.

The earliest half marathon recognised by the ARRS is the 1960 Romford Half Marathon in England, though it was short of the full half marathon distance. The earliest half marathon recognised by World Athletics is the 1965 Feckleton Half Marathon in England. The event grew in popularity, leading to the eventual establishment of the World Athletics Road Running Championships in 1992, originally titled the IAAF World Half Marathon Championships.

== Area records ==
- Updated 23 August 2026.

| Area | Men | | | Women | | |
| Area | Time | Season | Athlete | Time | Season | Athlete |
|---|---|---|---|---|---|---|
| World | 56:51 | 2026 | Yomif Kejelcha (ETH) | 1:02:52 Mx | 2021 | Letesenbet Gidey (ETH) |
Area records
| Africa (records) | 56:51 | 2026 | Yomif Kejelcha (ETH) | 1:02:52 Mx | 2021 | Letesenbet Gidey (ETH) |
| Asia (records) | 58:23 | 2026 | Birhanu Balew (BHR) | 1:05:22 Mx | 2017 | Violah Jepchumba (BHR) |
| Europe (records) | 58:06 | 2026 | Andreas Almgren (SWE) | 1:05:15 Mx | 2018 | Sifan Hassan (NED) |
| North, Central America and Caribbean (records) | 59:15 | 2025 | Conner Mantz (USA) | 1:06:04 | 2026 | Weini Kelati (USA) |
| Oceania (records) | 59:47 | 2015 | Zane Robertson (NZL) | 1:07:11 | 2011 | Kimberley Smith (NZL) |
| South America (records) | 59:33 | 2007 | Marílson Gomes dos Santos (BRA) | 1:09:21 | 2025 | Florencia Borelli (ARG) |

== All-time top 25 ==
=== Men ===
- Correct as of October 2026.

| Rank | Time | Athlete | Date | Place | Ref. |
|---|---|---|---|---|---|
| 1 | 56:42 (Note: Not ratified as a world record due to the runner's proximity to the lead pace car) | Jacob Kiplimo (UGA) | 16 February 2025 | Barcelona | |
| 2 | 56:51 | Yomif Kejelcha (ETH) | 23 August 2026 | Buenos Aires | |
| 3 | 57:32 | Kibiwott Kandie (KEN) | 6 December 2020 | Valencia | |
| 4 | 57:41 | Hagos Gebrhiwet (ETH) | 22 October 2023 | Valencia | |
| 5 | 57:50 | Selemon Barega (ETH) | 22 October 2023 | Valencia | |
| 6 | 57:59 | Alexander Mutiso (KEN) | 6 December 2020 | Valencia | |
| 7 | 58:01 | Geoffrey Kamworor (KEN) | 15 September 2019 | Copenhagen | |
| 8 | 58:02 | Sabastian Sawe (KEN) | 6 March 2022 | Rome–Ostia | |
| 9 | 58:03 | Rodrigue Kwizera (BDI) | 25 October 2026 | Valencia | |
| 10 | 58:06 | Andreas Almgren (SWE) | 20 September 2026 | Copenhagen | |
| 11 | 58:07 | Abel Kipchumba (KEN) | 24 October 2021 | Valencia | |
| 12 | 58:08 | Nicholas Kipkorir Kimeli (KEN) | 8 March 2026 | Lisboa | |
| 13 | 58:09 | Thierry Ndikumwenayo (ESP) | 25 October 2026 | Valencia | |
| 14 | 58:10 | Isaia Kipkoech Lasoi (KEN) | 15 September 2024 | Copenhagen | |
| 15 | 58:11 | Philemon Kiplimo (KEN) | 6 December 2020 | Valencia | |
| 16 | 58:12 | Vincent Kipruto (KEN) | 25 October 2026 | Valencia | |
| 17 | 58:17 | Daniel Mateiko (KEN) | 27 October 2024 | Valencia | |
| 18 | 58:23 | Zersenay Tadese (ERI) | 21 March 2010 | Lisbon | |
| 18 | 58:23 | Birhanu Balew (BHR) | 14 February 2026 | Ras Al Khaimah | |
| 20 | 58:24 | Vincent Kibet Langat (KEN) | 14 September 2025 | Copenhagen | |
| 21 | 58:26 | Joshua Cheptegei (UGA) | 20 September 2026 | Copenhagen | |
| 22 | 58:27 | Gilbert Kipkosgei Kiprotich (KEN) | 23 March 2025 | Malaga | |
| 23 | 58:28 | Kennedy Kimutai (KEN) | 24 October 2021 | Valencia | |
| 24 | 58:32 | Tadese Worku (ETH) | 25 October 2026 | Valencia | |
| 25 | 58:33 | Samuel Wanjiru (KEN) | 17 March 2007 | The Hague | |
| 25 | 58:33 | Jemal Yimer (ETH) | 28 October 2018 | Valencia | |

==== Notes ====
Below is a list of other times equal or superior to 58:33:

- Jacob Kiplimo also ran 57:20 (2026), 57:31 (2021), 57:37 (2020), 57:56 (2022) and 58:09 (2024)
- Yomif Kejelcha also ran 57:30 (2024), 57:41 (2023), 58:02 (2025) and 58:32 (2022)
- Kibiwott Kandie also ran 57:40 (2023) and 58:10 (2022)
- Sabastian Sawe also ran 58:05 (2024), 58:24 (2024) and 58:29 (2023)
- Hagos Gebrhiwet also ran 58:05 (2026)
- Geoffrey Kamworor also ran 58:14 (2026)
- Abraham Kiptum ran 58:18, but it was expunged for doping
- Isaia Kipkoech Lasoi also ran 58:21 (2024)
- Nicholas Kipkorir Kimeli also ran 58:23 (2025)
- Daniel Mateiko also ran 58:26 (2021)
- Zersenay Tadese also ran 58:30(2011)

Performance annulled due to doping offences:

| Time | Athlete | Date | Place | Ref. |
|---|---|---|---|---|
| 57:49 | Rhonex Kipruto (KEN) | 6 December 2020 | Valencia | |
| 58:30 | Rodgers Kwemoi (KEN) | 19 February 2022 | Ras al-Khaimah | |

=== Women ===
- Correct as of February 2026.

| Rank | Time | Athlete | Date | Place | Ref. |
|---|---|---|---|---|---|
| 1 | 1:02:52 Mx | Letesenbet Gidey (ETH) | 24 October 2021 | Valencia | |
| 2 | 1:03:04 Mx | Agnes Jebet Ngetich (KEN) | 27 October 2024 | Valencia | |
| 3 | 1:03:21 Mx | Fotyen Tesfay (ETH) | 27 October 2024 | Valencia | |
| 4 | 1:03:32 Mx | Lilian Kasait Rengeruk (KEN) | 27 October 2024 | Valencia | |
| 5 | 1:03:51 Mx | Yalemzerf Yehualaw (ETH) | 24 October 2021 | Valencia | |
| 6 | 1:04:01 Mx | Loice Chemnung (KEN) | 15 February 2026 | Barcelona | |
| 7 | 1:04:02 Mx | Ruth Chepng'etich (KEN) | 4 April 2021 | Istanbul | |
| 8 | 1:04:13 Mx | Joyciline Jepkosgei (KEN) | 16 February 2025 | Barcelona | |
| 9 | 1:04:14 Mx | Girmawit Gebrzihair (ETH) | 19 February 2022 | Ras al-Khaimah | |
| 10 | 1:04:14 Mx | Ejgayehu Taye (ETH) | 27 October 2024 | Valencia | |
| 11 | 1:04:21 | Tsigie Gebreselama (ETH) | 9 March 2025 | Lisboa | |
| 12 | 1:04:22 Mx | Hellen Obiri (KEN) | 19 February 2022 | Ras al-Khaimah | |
| 13 | 1:04:31 Mx | Ababel Yeshaneh (ETH) | 21 February 2020 | Ras al-Khaimah | |
| 14 | 1:04:36 Mx | Sheila Chepkirui (KEN) | 19 February 2022 | Ras al-Khaimah | |
| 15 | 1:04:37 | Irine Kimais (KEN) | 19 February 2023 | Barcelona | |
| 16 | 1:04:37 Mx | Sutume Kebede (ETH) | 14 January 2024 | Houston | |
| 17 | 1:04:40 Mx | Senbere Teferi (ETH) | 11 February 2024 | Barcelona | |
| 18 | 1:04:44 | Likina Amebaw (ETH) | 14 September 2025 | Copenhagen | |
| 19 | 1:04:46 | Margaret Kipkemboi (KEN) | 22 October 2023 | Valencia | |
| 20 | 1:04:49 Mx | Brigid Kosgei (KEN) | 21 February 2020 | Ras al-Khaimah | |
| 20 | 1:04:49 Mx | Fantaye Belayneh (ETH) | 11 January 2026 | Houston | |
| 22 | 1:04:52 | Fancy Chemutai (KEN) | 9 February 2018 | Ras al-Khaimah | |
| 23 | 1:04:53 | Irine Chepet Cheptai (KEN) | 22 October 2023 | Valencia | |
| 24 | 1:04:55 | Mary Keitany (KEN) | 9 February 2018 | Ras al-Khaimah | |
| 25 | 1:05:00 | Sharon Lokedi (KEN) | 14 September 2025 | Copenhagen | |

==== Notes ====
Below is a list of other times equal or superior to 1:05:00:

- Agnes Jebet Ngetich also ran 1:03:08 Mx (2025)
- Fotyen Tesfay also ran 1:03:35 (2025), 1:03:57 Mx (2026) and 1:04:46 (2022)
- Yalemzerf Yehualaw also ran 1:03:44 Mx a (2021, not legal), 1:04:22 Mx (2022), 1:04:40 Mx (2021) and 1:04:46 (2020)
- Ruth Chepng'etich also ran 1:04:16 + Mx (2024)
- Hellen Obiri also ran 1:04:22 Mx (2022), 1:04:48 (2022) and 1:04:51 Mx (2021)
- Joyciline Jepkosgei also ran 1:04:29 Mx (2024), 1:04:46 Mx (2023), 1:04:51 (2017) and 1:04:52 (2017)
- Brigid Kosgei also ran 1:04:50 (2020), 1:04:50 (2020) and 1:04:50 Mx a (2019, not legal)

== World leading times ==
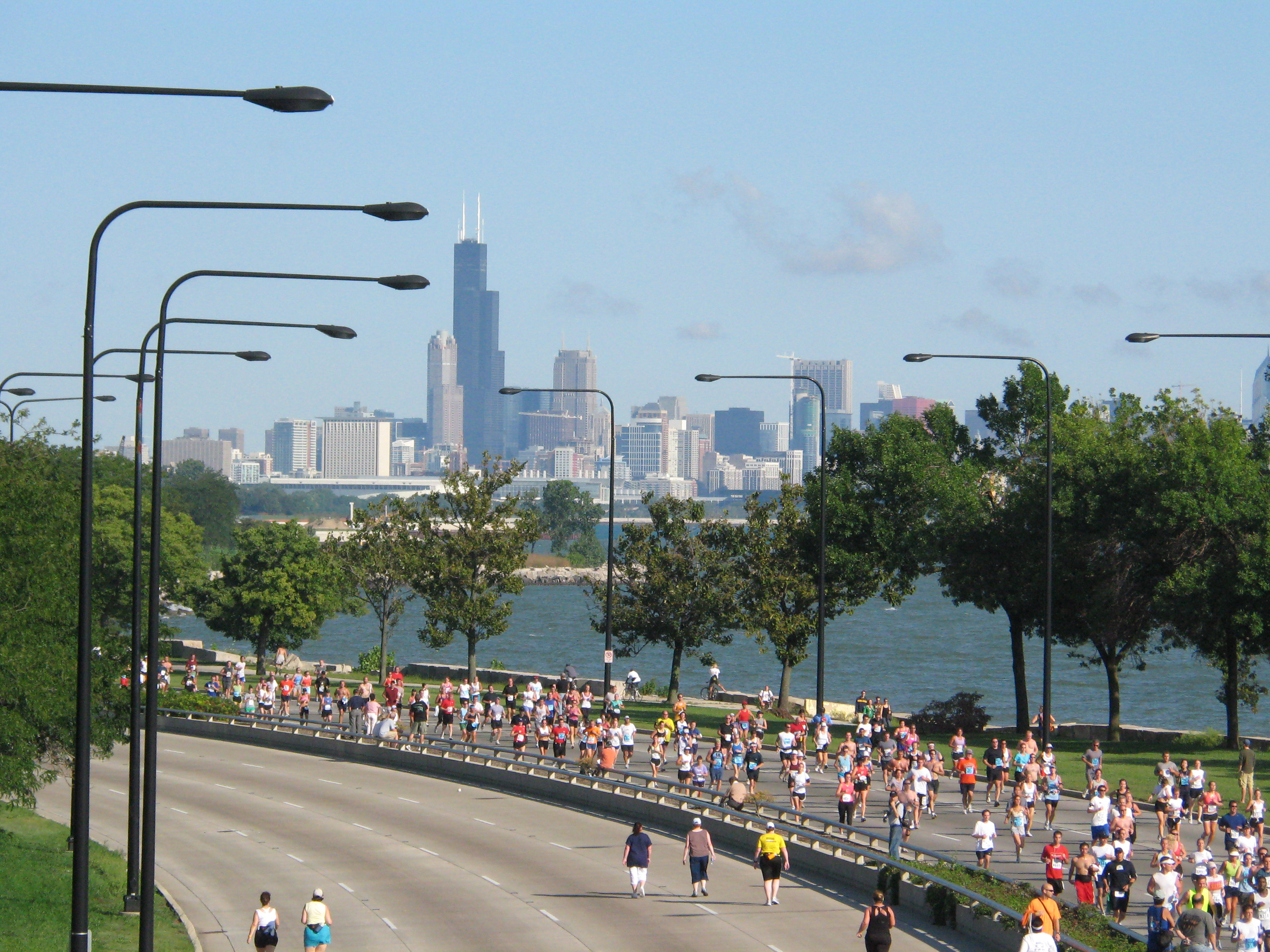
The Chicago Half Marathon is a Chicago Marathon tune-up on Lake Shore Drive in the South Side of Chicago.

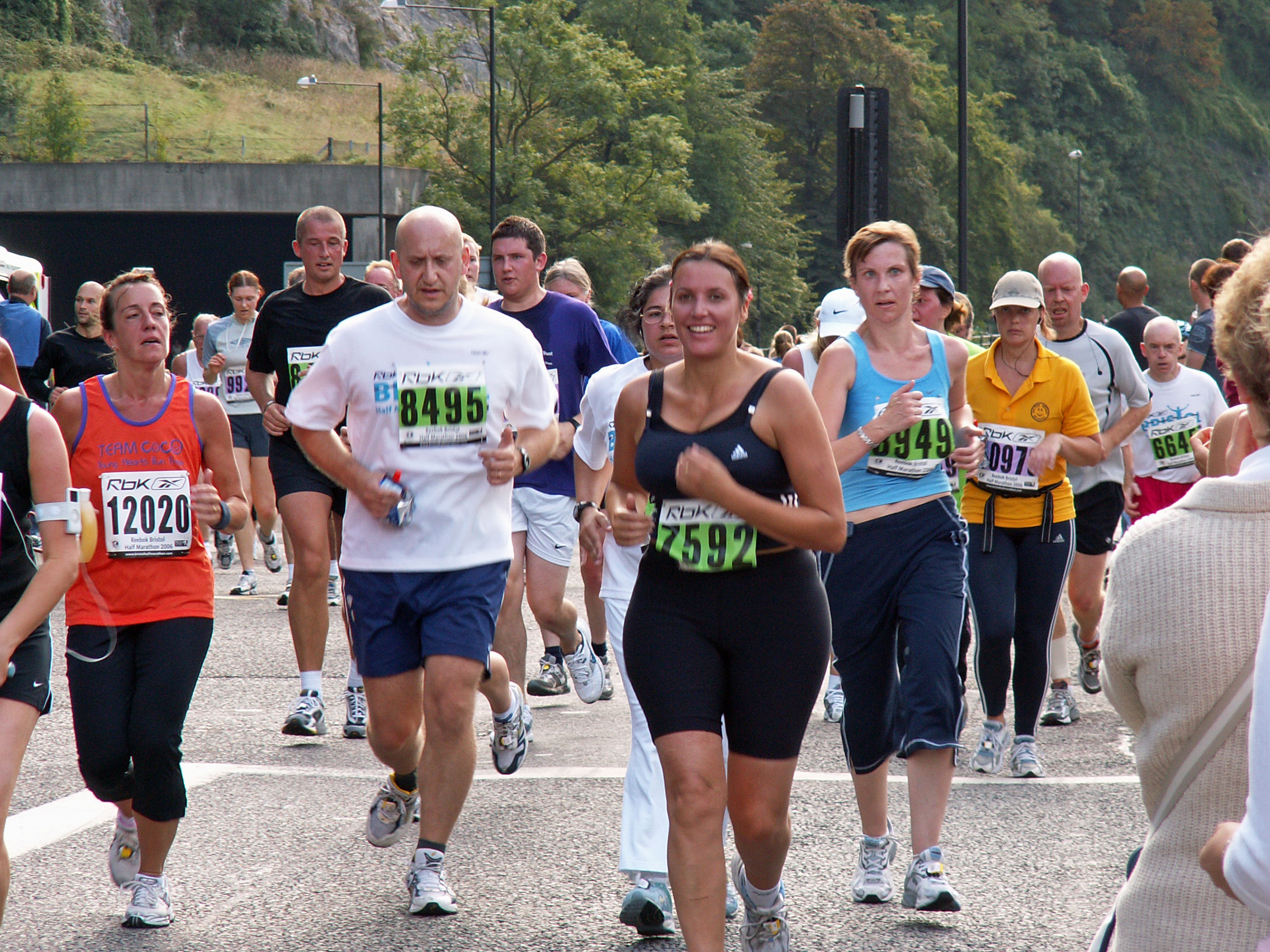
Runners taking part in the Bristol Half Marathon

This table lists the best half marathon performances per year since 1970, as recorded by the ARRS.

| Year | Time | Men | Place | Time | Women | Place |
|---|---|---|---|---|---|---|
| 1970 | 1:03:53 | Derek Graham (GBR) | Belfast | | | |
| 1971 | 1:05:25 | Ron Hill (GBR) | Freckleton | 1:23:56 | Kathy Gibbons (USA) | Phoenix |
| 1972 | 1:04:23 | Víctor Manuel Mora (COL) | Coamo | 1:31:55 | Nadia Garcia (USA) | San Diego |
| 1973 | 1:05:07 | Mario Cuevas (MEX) | Maracaibo | | | |
| 1974 | 1:04:45 | Vladimir Merkushin (URS) | Wieze | 1:23:11 | Chantal Langlacé (FRA) | Ay |
| 1975 | 1:05:08 | Paul Angenvoorth (FRG) | Grevenmacher | | | |
| 1976 | 1:03:46 | Rafael Pérez (CRC) | Coamo | 1:29:43 | Rita Borralho (POR) | Nazaré |
| 1977 | 1:02:37 | Toshihiro Matsumoto (JPN) | Beppu | 1:22:05 | Silvana Cruciata (ITA) | Milan |
| 1978 | 1:02:47 | Tony Simmons (GBR) | Welwyn Garden City | 1:15:04 | Marty Cooksey (USA) | San Diego |
| 1979 | 1:02:32 | Kirk Pfeffer (USA) | Las Vegas | 1:14:03 | Patti Catalano (USA) | Manchester |
| 1980 | 1:02:16 | Stan Mavis (USA) | New Orleans | 1:13:59 | Marja Wokke (NED) | The Hague |
| 1981 | 1:01:47 | Herb Lindsay (USA) | Manchester | 1:11:16 | Joan Samuelson (USA) | San Diego |
| 1982 | 1:01:36 | Michael Musyoki (KEN) | Philadelphia | 1:09:57 | Grete Waitz (NOR) | Gothenburg |
| 1983 | 1:01:32 | Paul Cummings (USA) | Dayton | 1:09:10 | Joan Samuelson (USA) | Philadelphia |
| 1984 | 1:01:52 | Alberto Cova (ITA) | Milan | 1:08:34 | Joan Samuelson (USA) | Philadelphia |
| 1985 | 1:00:55 | Mark Curp (USA) | Philadelphia | 1:09:44 | Joan Samuelson (USA) | Philadelphia |
| 1986 | 1:00:43 | Michael Musyoki (KEN) | South Shields | 1:09:03 | Ingrid Kristiansen (NOR) | Drammen |
| 1987 | 1:01:04 | Carl Thackery (GBR) | Barnsley | 1:06:40 | Ingrid Kristiansen (NOR) | Sandnes |
| 1988 | 1:01:00 | John Treacy (IRL) | South Shields | 1:08:49 | Grete Waitz (NOR) | South Shields |
| 1989 | 1:01:10 | Matthews Temane (RSA) | Durban | 1:08:31 | Ingrid Kristiansen (NOR) | New Bedford |
| 1990 | 1:00:34 | Steve Moneghetti (AUS) | South Shields | 1:09:33 | Rosa Mota (POR) | South Shields |
| 1991 | 1:00:51 | Moses Tanui (KEN) | Milan | 1:07:59 | Elana Meyer (RSA) | East London |
| 1992 | 1:00:24 | Benson Masya (KEN) | South Shields | 1:08:42 | Liz McColgan (GBR) | Dundee |
| 1993 | 59:47 | Moses Tanui (KEN) | Milan (Note: Published in IAAF documents, including IAAF top lists Archived 2009-02-16 at the Wayback Machine. The ARRS has suggested that the Stramilano half marathon course might have been short in 1993 and lists the best time for 1993 as 1:00:15 by Moses Tanui from Kenya.) | 1:09:35 | Valentina Yegorova (RUS) | St Petersburg |
| 1994 | 1:00:02 | Benson Masya (KEN) | South Shields | 1:07:59 | Uta Pippig (GER) | Kyoto |
| 1995 | 1:00:26 | Simon Lopuyet (KEN) | Lisbon | 1:07:59 | Uta Pippig (GER) | Kyoto |
| 1996 | 1:00:31 | Paul Koech (KEN) | Ivry-sur-Seine | 1:09:15 | Nadia Prasad (NCL) | Paris |
| 1997 | 59:56 | Shem Kororia (KEN) | Košice | 1:07:36 | Elana Meyer (RSA) | Kyoto |
| 1998 | 59:17 | Paul Tergat (KEN) | Milan | 1:07:29 | Elana Meyer (RSA) | Kyoto |
| 1999 | 59:22 | Paul Tergat (KEN) | Milan | 1:06:44 | Elana Meyer (RSA) | Tokyo |
| 2000 | 1:00:30 | Kenichi Takahashi (JPN) | Tokyo | 1:07:07 | Paula Radcliffe (GBR) | South Shields |
| 2001 | 59:52 | Fabián Roncero (ESP) | Berlin | 1:06:47 | Paula Radcliffe (GBR) | Bristol |
| 2002 | 59:41 | Haile Gebrselassie (ETH) | Lisbon | 1:07:19 | Sonia O'Sullivan (IRL) | South Shields |
| 2003 | 1:00:01 | Hendrick Ramaala (RSA) | South Shields | 1:05:39 | Paula Radcliffe (GBR) | South Shields |
| 2004 | 59:37 | Dejene Berhanu (ETH) | South Shields | 1:07:55 | Benita Johnson (AUS) | South Shields |
| 2005 | 59:05 | Zersenay Tadese (ERI) | South Shields | 1:07:33 | Derartu Tulu (ETH) | South Shields |
| 2006 | 58:55 | Haile Gebrselassie (ETH) | Tempe | 1:07:16 | Edith Masai (KEN) | Berlin |
| 2007 | 58:33 | Samuel Wanjiru (KEN) | The Hague | 1:06:25 | Lornah Kiplagat (NED) | Udine |
| 2008 | 59:15 | Haile Gebrselassie (ETH); Deriba Merga (ETH) | Lisbon; New Delhi | 1:07:57 | Philes Ongori (KEN) | Marugame |
| 2009 | 58:52 | Patrick Makau (KEN) | Ras al-Khaimah | 1:06:36 | Mary Keitany (KEN) | Birmingham |
| 2010 | 58:23 | Zersenay Tadese (ERI) | Lisbon | 1:07:07 | Elvan Abeylegesse (TUR) | Ras al-Khaimah |
| 2011 | 58:30 | Zersenay Tadese (ERI) | Lisbon | 1:05:50 | Mary Keitany (KEN) | Ras al-Khaimah |
| 2012 | 58:47 | Atsedu Tsegay (ETH) | Prague | 1:06:49 | Mary Keitany (KEN) | Ras al-Khaimah |
| 2013 | 58:54 | Geoffrey Kipsang (KEN) | Ras al-Khaimah | 1:06:09 | Lucy Kabuu (KEN) | Ras al-Khaimah |
| 2014 | 58:48 | Abraham Cheroben (KEN) | Valencia | 1:05:12 | Florence Kiplagat (KEN) | Barcelona |
| 2015 | 59:10 | Abraham Cheroben (KEN) | Valencia | 1:05:09 | Florence Kiplagat (KEN) | Barcelona |
| 2016 | 58:44 | Solomon Yego (KEN) | Ostia | 1:05:51 | Violah Jepchumba (KEN) | Prague |
| 2017 | 58:40 | Abraham Cheroben (BHR) | Copenhagen | 1:04:51 | Joyciline Jepkosgei (KEN) | Valencia |
| 2018 | 58:33 | Jemal Yimer Mekonnen (ETH) | Valencia | 1:04:52 | Fancy Chemutai (KEN) | Ras al-Khaimah |
| 2019 | 58:01 | Geoffrey Kamworor (KEN) | Copenhagen | 1:05:28 | Brigid Kosgei (KEN) | Manama |
| 2020 | 57:32 | Kibiwott Kandie (KEN) | Valencia | 1:04:31 | Ababel Yeshaneh (ETH) | Ras al-Khaimah |
| 2021 | 57:31 | Jacob Kiplimo (UGA) | Lisbon | 1:02:52 | Letesenbet Gidey (ETH) | Valencia |
| 2022 | 57:56 | Jacob Kiplimo (UGA) | Ras al-Khaimah | 1:04:14 | Girmawit Gebrzihair (ETH) | Ras al-Khaimah |
| 2023 | 57:40 | Kibiwott Kandie (KEN) | Valencia | 1:04:37 | Irine Kimais (KEN) | Barcelona |
| 2024 | 57:30 | Yomif Kejelcha (ETH) | Valencia | 1:03:04 | Agnes Ngetich (KEN) | Valencia |
| 2025 | 56:42 | Jacob Kiplimo (UGA) | Barcelona | 1:03:08 | Agnes Ngetich (KEN) | Valencia |
| 2026 | 56:51 | Yomif Kejelcha (ETH) | Buenos Aires | 1:03:51 | Sheila Chepkirui (KEN) | Valencia |

The largest half marathon ever held was Broloppet (the Bridge race) between Copenhagen in Denmark and Malmö in Sweden with 79,719 finishers, held in connection with the Øresund Bridge inauguration in 2000.

== See also ==
- List of half marathon races
- World Athletics Half Marathon Championships
- Mini marathon
- Quarter marathon
- Half marathon world record progression
- One hour run
