= Half marathon world record progression =

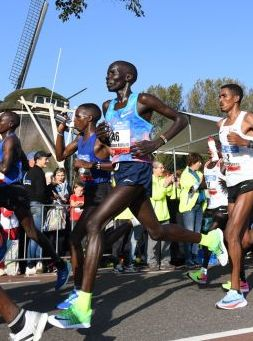
Abraham Kiptum, ran a half marathon in 2018 in a time of 58:18, which would have been a world record (world record 58:23), but in 2019 this world record was nullified because of a doping violation verdict.

The world record in the half marathon has been officially recognized since 1 January 2004 by World Athletics, the international governing body for the sport of athletics. A total of five men's world records and six women's world records have been officially ratified since that date. The IAAF officially recognized the fastest times before that date as a "world best" from 1 January 2003 onwards. Before that date, the IAAF did not recognize any road running world records, though the concept of a world record was recognized by other organizations, such as the Association of Road Racing Statisticians (ARRS).

The men's world record in the half marathon was set at a time of 56:51 by Yomif Kejelcha of Ethiopia on August 23, 2026, at the Buenos Aires Half Marathon. Yomif Kejelcha reclaimed the record from Jacob Kiplimo of Uganda who previously set the record at 57:20 during the March 8, 2026 EDP Lisbon Half Marathon. Yomif Kejelcha's previous 57:30 world record was set at the 27 October 2024 Valencia Half Marathon. A time of 56:42, set by Jacob Kiplimo of Uganda on 16 February 2025 in the Barcelona Half Marathon, was not ratified due to illegal pacing.

The women's record is 1:02:52, set by Letesenbet Gidey on 24 October 2021, at the Valencia Half Marathon. The previous record of 1:04:02 was set by Ruth Chepngetich of Kenya on 4 April 2021, in Istanbul, Turkey. On 8 September 2019, Brigid Kosgei ran a time of 1:04:28 at the 2019 Great North Run in Newcastle, England. This was 23 seconds faster than the previous best, but the Great North Run was not eligible for record purposes. The IAAF has since 2011 also kept records for the fastest time run by women in women-only races (i.e. without male pacemakers). The best time for that category is held by Peres Jepchirchir, who ran 1:05:16 in Gdynia on 17 October 2020. There was some criticism of this change, as the IAAF originally intended to downgrade world records set in mixed-gender races to "world best" status. Still, in response the organization agreed to maintain historic marks as official.

Races close to the official half marathon distance of 21.0975 kilometers (13.1094 mi) had taken place throughout the early 20th century, and athletes had also been timed at the midpoint of full marathons, but the first half marathon races proper emerged in the 1960s. Some of that era, such as the Route du Vin Half Marathon and San Blas Half Marathon (which both took the official distance in 1966) are extant today. The earliest half marathon world record accepted by the Association of Track and Field Statisticians is that of 67:01 minutes run by Englishman Brian Hill-Cottingham in Romford in 1960. For women, the earliest ARRS-recognised time is that of American Kathy Gibbons, who finished the distance in 83:56 on 7 March 1971 in Phoenix, Arizona. The earliest men's and women's marks recognized as world records by the IAAF are 65:44 set by Ron Hill in 1965 and 75:04 set by Marty Cooksey in 1978.

On 30 March 1991, Arturo Barrios ran a world record distance of 21.101 km in one hour, becoming the first man to run the half marathon distance in under one hour. On 3 April 1993, Moses Tanui became the first man to run a half marathon race in under one hour, with a time of 59:47.

== World record progression ==
Key:
Listed by the World Athletics as a world best prior to official acceptance
Ratified by the World Athletics as a world best (since 1 January 2003) or world record (since 1 January 2004)
Pending ratification by World Athletics
Recognized by the Association of Road Racing Statisticians

=== Men ===
Time	Pace (km)	Name	Nationality	Date	Event/Place	Source	Notes
1:07:01	3:10	Brian Hill-Cottingham	United Kingdom	9 April 1960	Romford	ARRS	
1:05:44	3:07	Ron Hill	United Kingdom	19 June 1965	Freckleton	IAAF, ARRS	
1:05:42	3:07	Pete Ravald	United Kingdom	18 June 1966	Freckleton	IAAF, ARRS	
1:04:28	3:03	Abebe Bikila	Ethiopia	21 October 1964	Tokyo	IAAF	(Note: Noted by the IAAF as set on an uncertified or aided course which does not fulfill the criteria specified in IAAF Rule 260.28.b or 260.28.c.) (Note: Noted by the IAAF as set en route to longer distances.)
1:03:22	3:00	Derek Clayton	Australia	3 December 1967	Fukuoka Marathon	IAAF	
1:03:53	3:02	Derek Graham	Ireland	2 May 1970	Belfast	IAAF, ARRS	
1:03:46	3:01	Juan Rafael Angel Perez	Costa Rica	8 February 1976	Coamo	IAAF, ARRS	
1:03:46	3:01	Jose Reveyn	Belgium	27 March 1976	The Hague	IAAF	
1:02:57	2:59	Miruts Yifter	Ethiopia	6 February 1977	Coamo	IAAF	IAAF notes unrounded time as 1:02:56.3
1:02:37	2:58	Toshihiro Matsumoto	Japan	6 February 1977	Beppu, Ōita	ARRS	
1:02:47	2:59	Tony Simmons	United Kingdom	24 June 1978	Welwyn Garden City	IAAF	
1:02:36	2:58	Nick Rose	United Kingdom	14 October 1979	Dayton	IAAF, ARRS	
1:02:32	2:58	Kirk Pfeffer	United States	7 December 1979	Las Vegas	IAAF, ARRS	
1:02:16	2:57	Stan Mavis	United States	27 January 1980	New Orleans	IAAF, ARRS	
1:01:47	2:56	Herb Lindsay	United States	20 September 1981	Manchester, Vermont	IAAF	
1:01:36	2:55	Michael Musyoki	Kenya	19 September 1982	Philadelphia	IAAF, ARRS	
1:01:32	2:55	Paul Cummings	United States	25 September 1983	Dayton	IAAF, ARRS	
1:01:14	2:54	Steve Jones	United Kingdom	11 August 1985	Birmingham	IAAF, ARRS	
1:00:55	2:53	Mark Curp	United States	15 September 1985	Philadelphia	IAAF, ARRS	
1:00:43	2:53	Michael Musyoki	Kenya	8 June 1986	South Shields	IAAF	
1:00:10	2:51	Matthews Temane	South Africa	25 July 1987	East London	IAAF	
1:00:46	2:53	Dionicio Cerón	Mexico	16 September 1990	Philadelphia	ARRS	
1:00:06	2:51	Steve Moneghetti	Australia	24 January 1993	Tokyo	IAAF	
1:00:24	2:52	Benson Masya	Kenya	3 April 1993	The Hague	ARRS	
59:47	2:50	Moses Tanui	Kenya	3 April 1993	Milan	IAAF	
1:00:13	2:51	Paul Tergat	Kenya	15 April 1994	Milan	ARRS	
59:56	2:50	Shem Kororia	Kenya	4 October 1997	Košice	ARRS	
59:43	2:50	António Pinto	Portugal	15 March 1998	Lisbon	IAAF	
59:17	2:49	Paul Tergat	Kenya	4 April 1998	Milan	IAAF, ARRS	
59:06	2:48	Paul Tergat	Kenya	26 March 2000	Lisbon	IAAF	
59:16	2:48	Samuel Wanjiru	Kenya	11 September 2005	Rotterdam	IAAF, ARRS	ARRS notes unrounded time as 59:15.8
59:05	2:48	Zersenay Tadese	Eritrea	18 September 2005	South Shields	IAAF	
58:55	2:47	Haile Gebrselassie	Ethiopia	15 January 2006	Tempe	IAAF	Disputed by ARRS due to advantage of wind-shielding by a vehicle
59:07	2:48	Paul Malakwen Kosgei	Kenya	2 April 2006	Berlin	ARRS	
58:53	2:47	Samuel Wanjiru	Kenya	9 February 2007	Ras al-Khaimah	IAAF, ARRS	
58:33	2:46	Samuel Wanjiru	Kenya	17 March 2007	The Hague	IAAF, ARRS	ARRS notes time as 58:35
58:23	2:46	Zersenay Tadese	Eritrea	21 March 2010	Lisbon	IAAF, ARRS	
58:18	2:46	Abraham Kiptum	Kenya	28 October 2018	Valencia	IAAF	suspended for doping (26 April 2019)
58:01	2:45	Geoffrey Kamworor	Kenya	15 September 2019	Copenhagen	IAAF	
57:32	2:43	Kibiwott Kandie	Kenya	6 December 2020	Valencia	World Athletics	Banned for refusing a doping test in 2025
57:31	2:43	Jacob Kiplimo	Uganda	21 November 2021	Lisbon	World Athletics	
57:30	2:43	Yomif Kejelcha	Ethiopia	27 October 2024	Valencia	World Athletics	
57:20	2:43	Jacob Kiplimo	Uganda	8 March 2026	Lisbon	World Athletics	
56:51	2:42	Yomif Kejelcha	Ethiopia	23 August 2026	Buenos Aires	World Athletics	

=== Women ===
Time	Pace (km)	Name	Nationality	Date	Event/Place	Source	Notes
1:23:56	3:59	Kathy Gibbons	United States	7 March 1971	Phoenix, Arizona	ARRS	
1:23:11	3:57	Chantal Langlacé	France	8 September 1974	Aÿ-Champagne	ARRS	
1:22:05	3:53	Silvana Cruciata	Italy	3 April 1977	Milan	ARRS	
1:19:45	3:47	Marja Wokke	Netherlands	8 January 1978	Egmond aan Zee	ARRS	
1:18:44	3:44	Silvana Cruciata	Italy	16 April 1978	Milan	ARRS	
1:18:30	3:43	Jean Abare	United States	4 July 1978	Coronado, California	ARRS	
1:15:04	3:34	Marty Cooksey	United States	26 August 1978	San Diego	IAAF	
1:17:48	3:41	Daniele Justin	Belgium	12 November 1978	Nazaré, Portugal	ARRS	
1:15:58	3:36	Miki Gorman	United States	19 November 1978	Pasadena	IAAF, ARRS	
1:15:01	3:33	Ellison Goodall	United States	10 March 1979	Winston-Salem	IAAF, ARRS	
1:14:50	3:33	Kathy Mintie	United States	25 August 1979	San Diego	IAAF	
1:14:04	3:31	Patti Catalano	United States	23 September 1979	Manchester, Vermont	IAAF, ARRS	ARRS notes time as 1:14:03
1:13:59	3:30	Marja Wokke	Netherlands	29 March 1980	The Hague	IAAF, ARRS	
1:13:26	3:29	Joan Benoit	United States	18 January 1981	New Orleans	IAAF, ARRS	
1:11:16	3:23	Joan Benoit	United States	7 March 1981	San Diego	IAAF, ARRS	
1:09:57	3:19	Grete Waitz	Norway	15 May 1982	Gothenburg	IAAF, ARRS	
1:09:14	3:17	Joan Benoit	United States	18 September 1983	Philadelphia	IAAF, ARRS	ARRS notes time as 1:09:10
1:08:34	3:15	Joan Benoit	United States	16 September 1984	Philadelphia	IAAF, ARRS	
1:06:40	3:10	Ingrid Kristiansen	Norway	5 April 1987	Sandnes	IAAF, ARRS	
1:08:32	3:15	Ingrid Kristiansen	Norway	19 March 1989	New Bedford	IAAF	
1:07:59	3:13	Elana Meyer	South Africa	18 May 1991	East London	IAAF	
1:07:59	3:13	Uta Pippig	Germany	20 March 1994	Kyoto	IAAF	
1:07:58	3:13	Uta Pippig	Germany	19 March 1995	Kyoto	IAAF	
1:07:36	3:12	Elana Meyer	South Africa	9 March 1997	Kyoto	IAAF	
1:07:29	3:12	Elana Meyer	South Africa	8 March 1998	Kyoto	IAAF	
1:06:44	3:10	Elana Meyer	South Africa	15 January 1999	Tokyo	IAAF	
1:05:44	3:07	Susan Chepkemei	Kenya	1 April 2001	Lisbon	IAAF	
1:05:40	3:07	Paula Radcliffe	United Kingdom	21 September 2003	South Shields	IAAF	IAAF notes unrounded time as 1:05:39.6
1:06:25	3:09	Lornah Kiplagat	Netherlands	14 October 2007	World RR Champs, Udine	IAAF, ARRS	First world record recognized by the International Association of Athletics Federations. Mark also recognized as official world record.
1:05:50	3:07	Mary Keitany	Kenya	18 February 2011	Ras al-Khaimah	IAAF	
1:05:12	3:05	Florence Kiplagat	Kenya	16 February 2014	Barcelona	IAAF	
1:05:09	3:05	Florence Kiplagat	Kenya	15 February 2015	Barcelona	IAAF	
1:05:06	3:05	Peres Jepchirchir	Kenya	10 February 2017	Ras al-Khaimah	IAAF	
1:04:52	3:04	Joyciline Jepkosgei	Kenya	1 April 2017	Prague	IAAF	
1:04:51	3:04	Joyciline Jepkosgei	Kenya	22 October 2017	Valencia	IAAF	
1:06:11	3:08	Netsanet Gudeta	Ethiopia	24 March 2018	World HM Champs, Valencia	IAAF	
1:04:31	3:03	Ababel Yeshaneh	Ethiopia	21 February 2020	Ras al-Khaimah	IAAF	
1:05:34	3:06	Peres Jepchirchir	Kenya	5 September 2020	Prague	World Athletics	
1:05:16	3:06	Peres Jepchirchir	Kenya	17 October 2020	Gdynia	World Athletics	
1:04:02	3:02	Ruth Chepngetich	Kenya	4 April 2021	Istanbul	World Athletics	
1:03:44	3:01	Yalemzerf Yehualaw	Ethiopia	29 August 2021	Larne	World Athletics	
1:02:52	2:59	Letesenbet Gidey	Ethiopia	24 October 2021	Valencia	World Athletics	
