= 20 kilometres =

The term 20 kilometres may refer to two different races in athletics:

- 20 kilometres race walk
- 20 kilometres road running race
