= Fancy Chemutai =

Kenyan long-distance runner

Fancy Chemutai (born 20 March 1995) is a Kenyan long-distance runner who specializes in the half marathon.

She finished third in her debut at the Prague Half Marathon and won the Göteborgsvarvet in Gothenburg in 1:07:58. On 22 October 2017, in Valencia, she finished second behind Joyciline Jepkosgei, another Kenyan long-distance runner.

In 2018, she won the RAK Half Marathon, with the second-fastest ever time of 1:04:52, missing the world record held by Joyciline Jepkosgei by one second. In 2019 at the B.A.A. 10K, presented by Brigham and Women's Hospital, Chemutai set a new women's course record of 30:36.
