= Philemon Kiplimo =

Kenyan long-distance runner

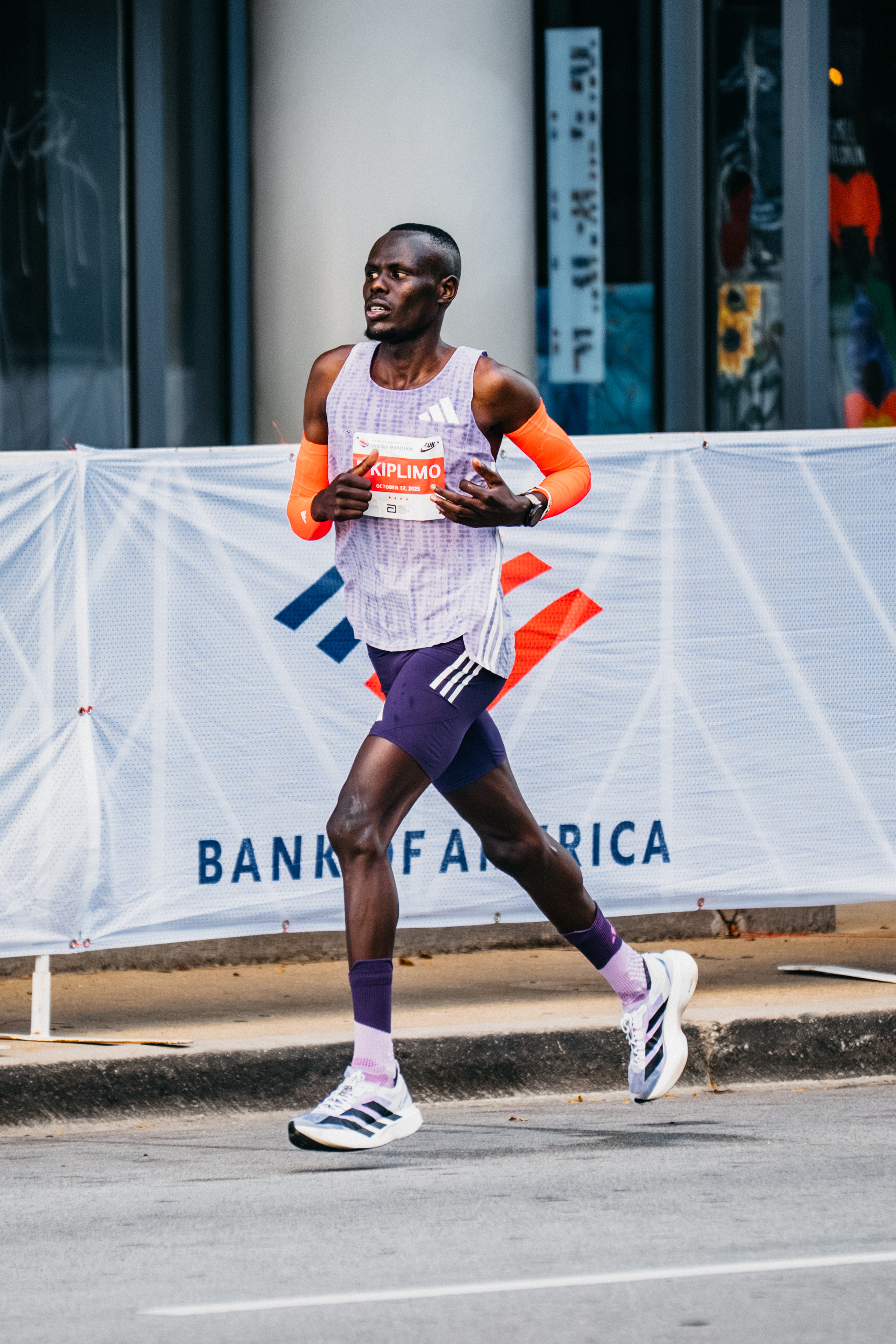
- Kimaiyo at mile 25 of the 2025 Chicago Marathon

Personal information
- Nationality: Kenyan
- Born: Philemon Kiplimo Kimaiyo; October 10, 1998 (age 27) Kenya
- Occupation: Long-distance runner
- Years active: 2019–present

Sport
- Country: Kenya
- Sport: Long-distance running
- Events: Marathon, Half marathon

Achievements and titles
- Personal bests: Marathon: 2:04:01 (Hamburg, 2025); Half Marathon: 58:11 (Valencia, 2020)

Philemon Kiplimo Kimaiyo (born 10 October 1998) is a Kenyan long-distance runner who specializes in road racing. He is one of the world's fastest half marathon runners of all time and has achieved top results in major international marathons.

He is serving a two-year doping ban, until September 2028, for use of the banned diuretic chlortalidone.

== Career ==
In 2019, he won the B.A.A. Half Marathon in Boston. His breakthrough performance came at the 2020 Valencia Half Marathon, where he finished fifth in a historically fast race. His time of 58:11 places him among the top ten fastest performers ever for the distance. He then won the 2021 Bahrain Royal Night Half Marathon.

After several strong half marathon performances, Kiplimo transitioned to the full marathon. In his debut at the 2022 Valencia Marathon, he ran a 2:05:44. He followed this with a top-ten finish at the 2023 Berlin Marathon, finishing eighth with a new personal best of 2:04:56.

In April 2025, Kiplimo finished second in the Hamburg Marathon, improving his personal best by nearly a minute to clock a time of 2:04:01.

Since September 1, 2026, Kiplimo has been serving a two-year doping ban for use of chlortalidone, a banned diuretic or masking agent. His results since July 19, 2026 were disqualified. He admitted to the anti-doping violation, stating he took a medication prescribed to his wife without knowing its contents.

== Personal bests ==
- Marathon: 2:04:01 – Hamburg, Germany, 2025
- Half Marathon: 58:11 – Valencia, Spain, 2020
- 10 km Road: 27:23 – Castellón, Spain, 2022

== Major results ==
Year	Competition	Location	Position	Time
2019	B.A.A. Half Marathon	Boston, USA	1st	1:01:58
2020	Valencia Half Marathon	Valencia, Spain	5th	58:11
2021	Bahrain Royal Night Half Marathon	Manama, Bahrain	1st	1:00:01
2023	Berlin Marathon	Berlin, Germany	8th	2:04:56
2025	Hamburg Marathon	Hamburg, Germany	2nd	2:04:01
2025	Chicago Marathon	Chicago, USA	8th	2:06:14
