= Prague Half Marathon =

Annual half marathon

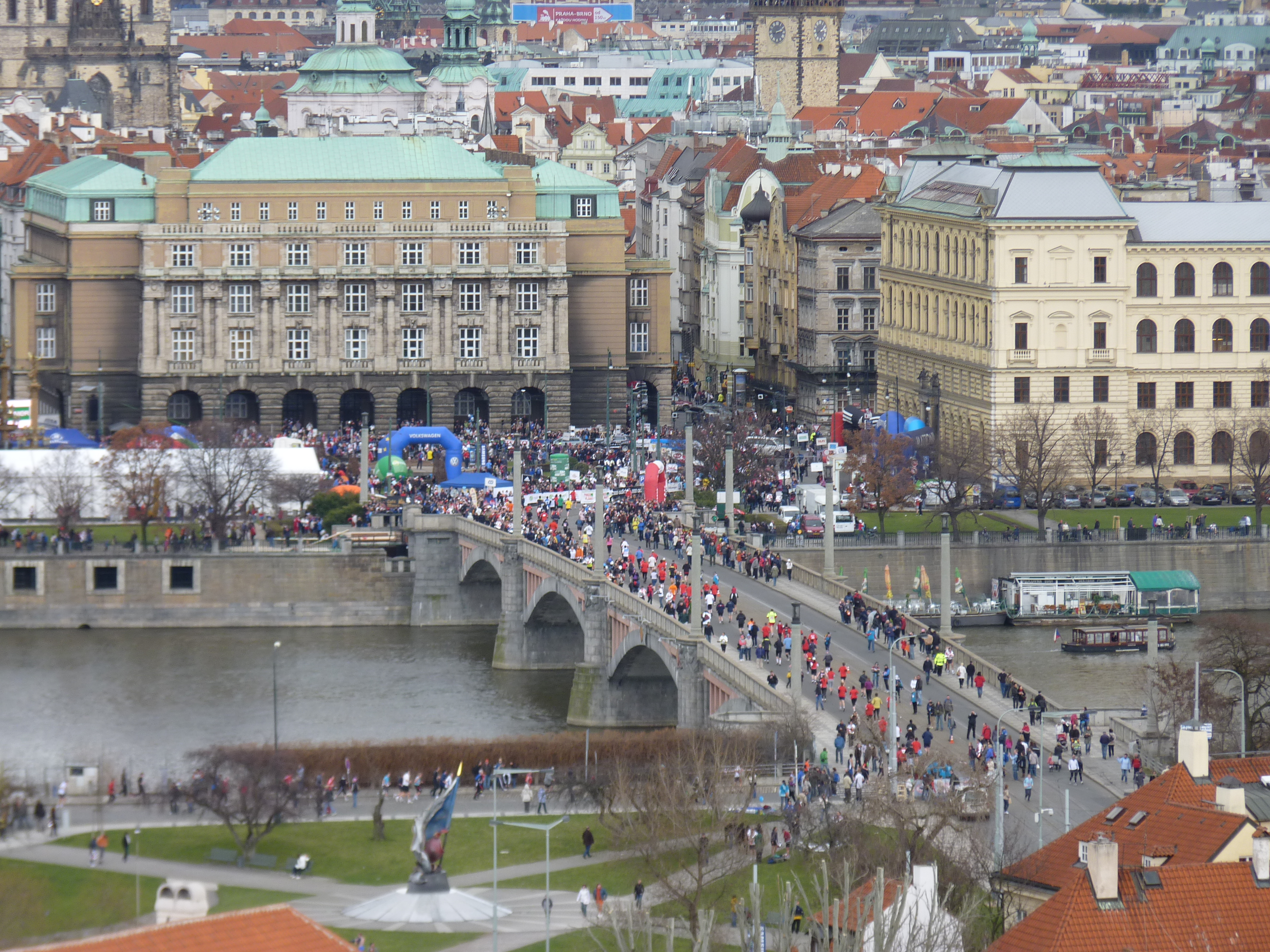
- Crossing the Vltava river via Mánes Bridge, 2010
- Date: Late March/Early April
- Location: Prague, Czech Republic
- Event type: Road
- Distance: Half marathon
- Established: 1999 (27 years ago)
- Course records: Men's: 58:24 (2024) (Kenya) Sabastian Sawe; Women's: 1:04:52 (2017) (Kenya) Joyciline Jepkosgei
- Website: Prague Half Marathon
- Participants: 15,623 finishers (2026)

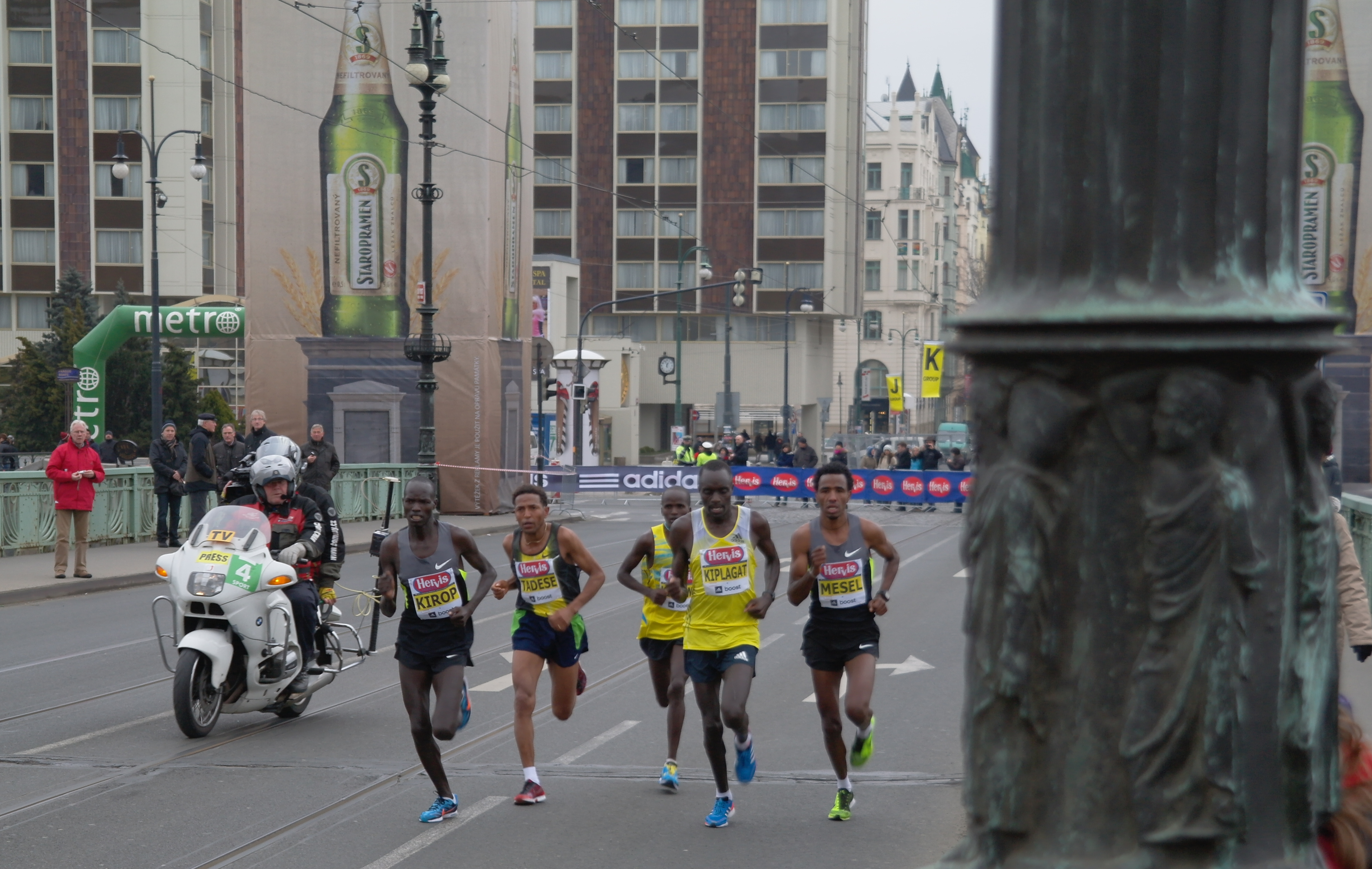
2013 winner Zersenay Tadese crossing the Čech Bridge with four other runners, minutes before the finish

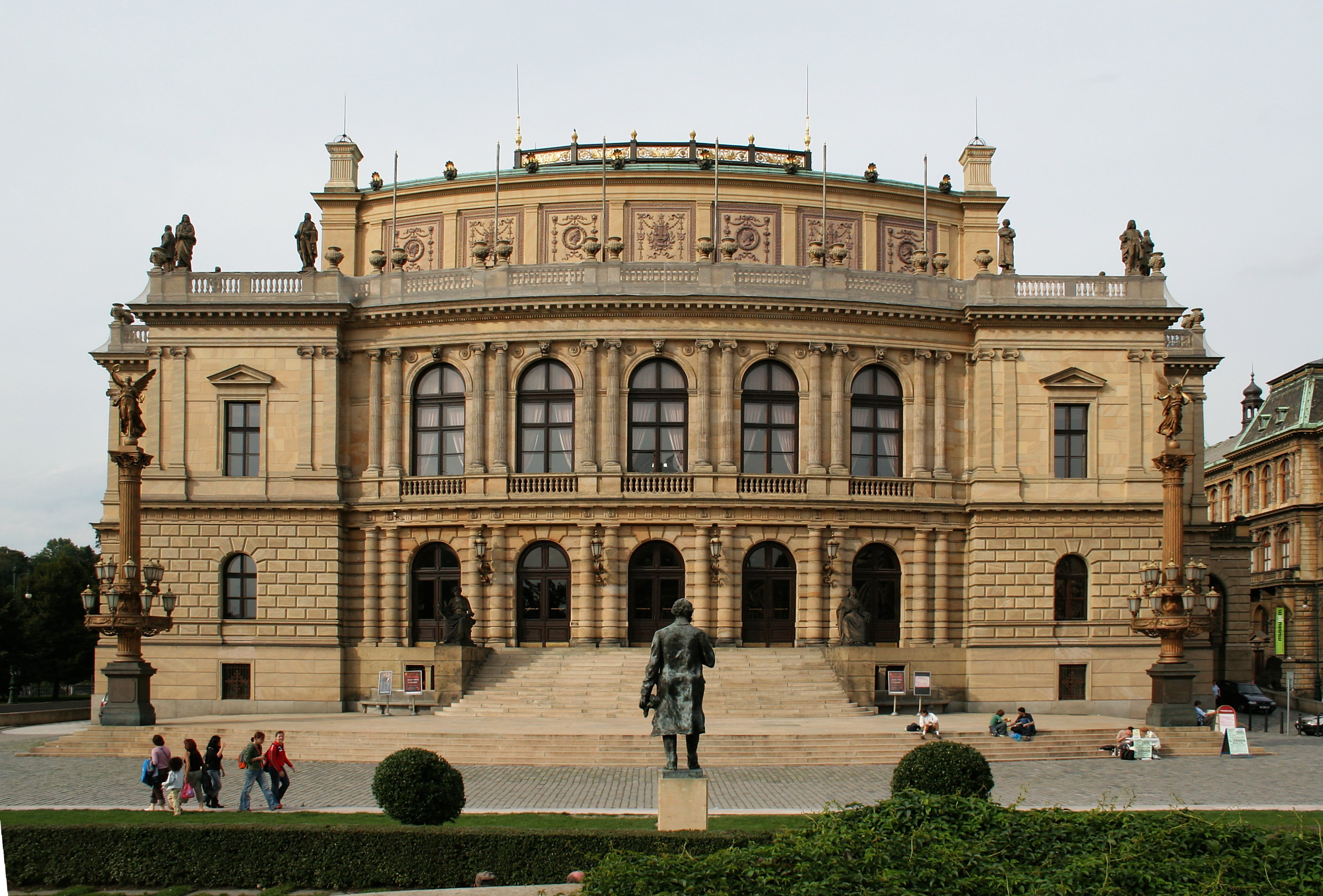
The Rudolfinum auditorium, location of the race start and finish

The Prague Half Marathon is an annual half marathon road running event which takes place in Spring on the city streets of Prague, Czech Republic, first held in 1999. It is managed by the same organisation that holds the Prague Marathon in May. The race has a loop course, starting and ending in Jan Palach Square near the Rudolfinum, and largely follows the Vltava river. The competition has enjoyed an increasing level of participation, with around 6500 participants in 2009 and almost 8500 runners taking part in the 2010 event. In 2020, Prague became one of six half marathons to form the European Superhalf Series

The Prague Half Marathon holds World Athletics Gold Label Road Race status. Joyciline Jepkosgei set the half marathon world record at the time during this race with a time of 1:04:52 in 2017. (Note: Months later, Jepkosgei later broke her own record by one second at the Valencia Half Marathon.)

== History ==
The half marathon was first held in 1999.

In 2006, a corporate team half marathon relay event was added to the day's programme of events – each company being represented by four runners each covering equal legs of 5.27 km. Around 100 teams and 50 business and institutions were present for the first race. In 2020, Prague became one of six half marathons to form the European Superhalf Series, along with Copenhagen, Lisbon, Berlin, Valencia and Cardiff.

Rodrigue Kwizera holds the men's course record of 58:16 minutes (set in 2026), while Joyciline Jepkosgei's mark of 64:52 minutes (set in 2017) is the best achieved by a woman in the Prague race and a world record at the time. Both of these times are the fastest ever run in the Czech Republic for the half marathon.

The 2020 edition of the race was cancelled due to the coronavirus pandemic, with all registrants given the option of transferring their entry to 2021 or 2022. (Note: It had initially been postponed before being cancelled.)

=== Prague 21.1 km ===
After cancelling the 2020 race, organizer RunCzech announced on 1 September 2020 that they were hosting an "invitation-only half marathon featuring 35 [elite] distance runners" in Letná Park on 5 September 2020. Named "Prague 21.1 km", the race would consist of about 16.5 laps of an oval of length 1,280 m (4,200 ft) on flat terrain in the park, with the men and women competing separately.

On the day of the race, Kenyan Peres Jepchirchir broke the women-only half marathon world record with a time of 1:05:34. (Note: The previous record was 1:06:11, set by Netsanet Gudeta at the 2018 IAAF World Half Marathon Championships in Valencia, Spain.) The world record held for only 42 days, as Jepchirchir broke it again herself at the 2020 World Athletics Half Marathon Championships in Gdynia, Poland, with a time of 1:05:16.

== Course ==
External image
- Course map of half marathon in 2019

The Prague Half Marathon has a looped course format which has its race start and end point on Jan Palach Square near the Rudolfinum. The course follows the Vltava river southwards and then makes an east-to-west loop passing Folimanka park. It crosses to the west side of the Vltava, heading over Palacky Bridge, and after heading south along Strakonická road it doubles back to follow the river north, before crossing Legion Bridge to reach the halfway point. The course traces a large loop into the northern part of the city centre before returning to the Rudolfinum for the finish point.

== Winners ==
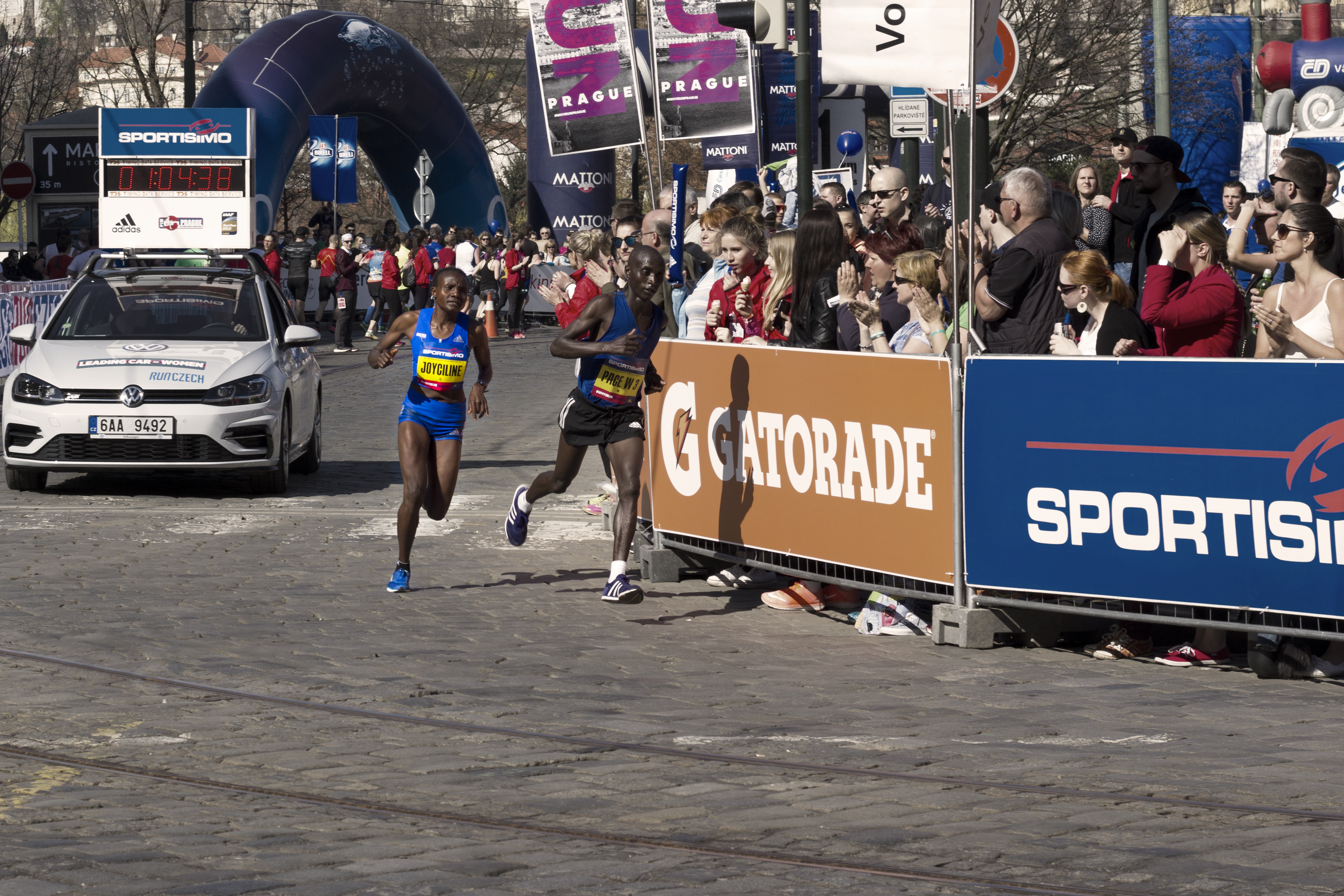
Joyciline Jepkosgei seconds away from breaking the world record in 2017

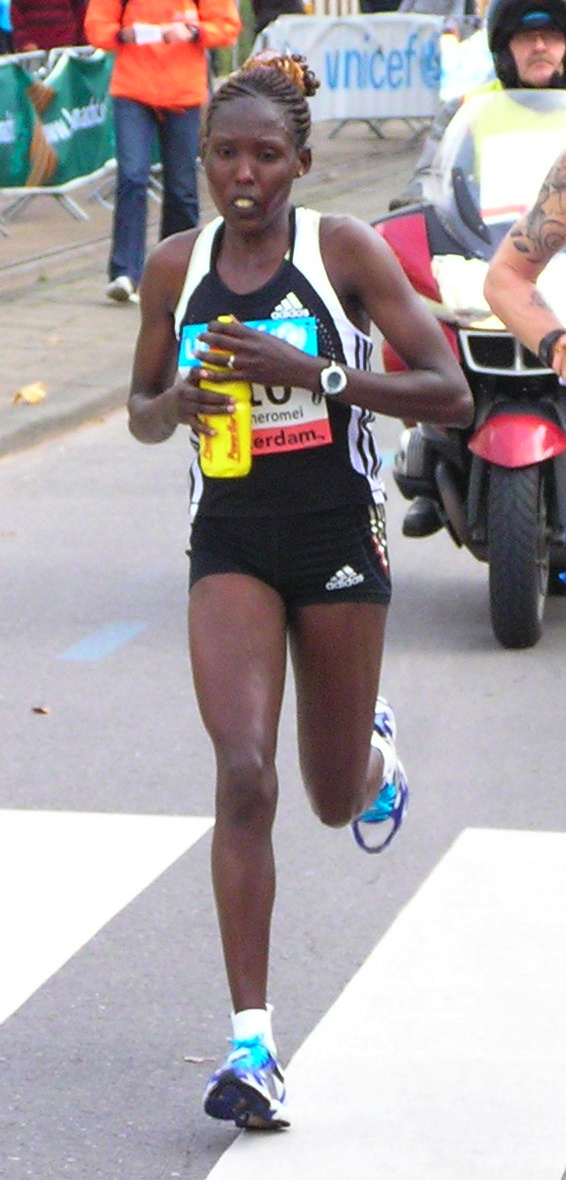
Kenyan Lydia Cheromei (pictured here at the Amsterdam Marathon in 2008) set a course record in 2011

=== Prague Half Marathon ===
Kenyan athletes have been dominant – all but five of the men's winners come from the East African country, which has also provided over half the female race winners. Daniel Wanjiru has topped the men's podium on two occasions, and both Jana Klimešová and Rose Kosgei have taken back-to-back wins in the women's event.

Key: Course record (in bold)

Ed.	Year	Men's winner	Time	Women's winner	Time	Rf.
1	1999	Ali Mabrouk El Zaidi (LBA)	1:04:48	Jana Klimešová (CZE)	1:15:39	
2	2000	Isaac Kiprono (KEN)	1:03:28	Jana Klimešová (CZE)	1:14:17	
3	2001	Anthony Korir (KEN)	1:02:09	Florence Barsosio (KEN)	1:12:51	
4	2002	Willy Kipkirui (KEN)	1:02:15	Gloria Marconi (ITA)	1:12:06	
5	2003	Fred Kiprop (KEN)	1:02:47	Helena Javornik (SLO)	1:11:03	
6	2004	Joseph Kiprotich (KEN)	1:01:46	Catherine Kirui (KEN)	1:10:38	
7	2005	Silas Kirui (KEN)	1:01:07	Susan Kirui (KEN)	1:12:49	
8	2006	Stephen Kibiwott (KEN)	1:01:15	Caroline Kwambai (KEN)	1:10:08	
9	2007	Patrick Ivuti (KEN)	1:01:00	Liliya Shobukhova (RUS)	1:11:14	
10	2008	Elijah Karanja (KEN)	1:02:08	Asha Gigi (ETH)	1:12:00	
11	2009	Nicholas Koech (KEN)	1:00:07	Rose Kosgei (KEN)	1:09:03	
12	2010	Joel Kemboi (KEN)	1:00:09	Rose Kosgei (KEN)	1:09:57	
13	2011	Philemon Limo (KEN)	59:30	Lydia Cheromei (KEN)	1:07:33	
14	2012	Atsedu Tsegay (ETH)	58:47	Joyce Chepkirui (KEN)	1:07:03	
15	2013	Zersenay Tadese (ERI)	1:00:10	Gladys Cherono (KEN)	1:06:48	
16	2014	Peter Kirui (KEN)	59:22	Joyce Chepkirui (KEN)	1:06:18	
17	2015	Daniel Wanjiru (KEN)	59:51	Worknesh Degefa (ETH)	1:07:14	
18	2016	Daniel Wanjiru (KEN)	59:20	Violah Jepchumba (KEN)	1:05:51	
19	2017	Tamirat Tola (ETH)	59:36	Joyciline Jepkosgei (KEN)	**1:04:52**	
20	2018	Benard Kimeli (KEN)	59:47	Joan Chelimo (KEN)	1:05:04	
21	2019	Benard Kimeli (KEN)	59:05	Caroline Kipkirui (KEN)	1:05:41	
	2020	cancelled due to coronavirus pandemic				
	2021	cancelled due to coronavirus pandemic				
22	2022	Kenneth Renju (KEN)	59:28	Nesphine Jepleting (KEN)	1:06:57	
23	2023	Roncer Kipkorir (KEN)	59:43	Irine Kimais (KEN)	1:06:00	
24	2024	Sabastian Sawe (KEN)	58:24	Gete Alemayehu (ETH)	1:08:10	
25	2025	Rodrigue Kwizera (BDI)	58:54	Lilian Kasait Rengeruk (KEN)	1:05:27	
26	2026	Rodrigue Kwizera (BDI)	**58:16**	Caroline Makandi Gitonga (KEN)	1:06:16	

=== Prague 21.1 km ===
Date	Men's winner	Time	Women's winner	Time	Rf.
2020.09.05	Kibiwott Kandie (KEN)	58:38	Peres Jepchirchir (KEN)	1:05:34 Wo	

=== By country ===
Country	Wins
Kenya	35
Ethiopia	4
Czech Republic	2
Eritrea	1
Italy	1
Libya	1
Russia	1
Slovenia	1
