= Kibiwott Kandie =

Kenyan long-distance runner

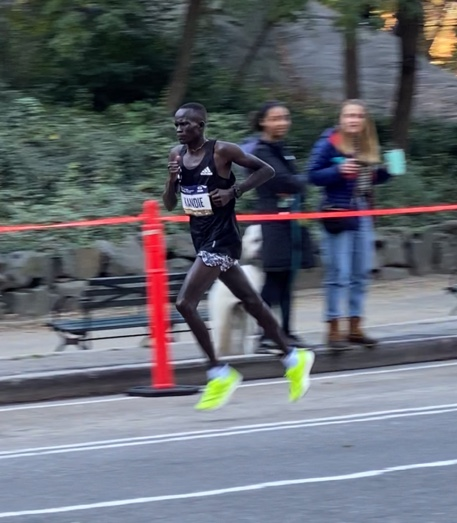
- Kibiwott Kandie at the 2021 New York City Marathon

Personal information
- Nationality: Kenyan
- Born: 20 June 1996 (age 30)

Sport
- Country: Kenya
- Sport: Athletics
- Event: Long-distance running

Achievements and titles
- Personal bests: Half marathon: 57:32 NR (Valencia 2020)
Medal record
Men's athletics
Representing Kenya
World Cross Country Championships
Gold medal – first place	2023 Bathurst	Senior team

Kibiwott Kandie (born 20 June 1996) is a Kenyan long-distance runner who held the world record in the half marathon from December 2020 to November 2021. Kandie won the silver medal in the men's race at the 2020 World Athletics Half Marathon Championships. He was part of the Kenyan team that won the gold medal at the 2023 World Cross Country Championships.

In 2026, Kandie was banned from athletics for seven years, until March 2032, after admitting to refusing to submit to sample collection and tampering with the doping control process.

== Career ==
In 2020, Kibiwott Kandie won the Ras Al Khaimah Half Marathon held in Ras Al Khaimah, United Arab Emirates. He also won the Prague 21.1 km event at the Prague Half Marathon held in Prague, Czech Republic. This was an invitation-only half marathon for elite runners. This event was held after the Prague Half Marathon was cancelled due to the COVID-19 pandemic.

In December 2020, at the Valencia Half Marathon, Kandie set a new half marathon world record with a time of 57:32, breaking the previous record set by Geoffrey Kamworor by almost half a minute.

On 4 April 2021, he set a course record of 59:32 at the Istanbul Half Marathon in Turkey. On 3 October, Kandie raced at The Giants Geneva 10k, where he won the race in 26:51.

In June 2026, Kandie was issued with a seven-year ban backdated to March 2025 by the Athletics Integrity Unit for two anti-doping rule violations. He received a four-year ban for refusing a doping test and another four-year ban for tampering with the doping control process by submitting false documents. He received a one-year reduction for early admission and acceptance of the sanction.

== Achievements ==
=== International competitions ===
Representing Kenya
Year	Competition	Venue	Position	Event	Time
2019	Saint Silvester Road Race	São Paulo, Brazil	1st	15 km	42:59 CR
2020	Ras Al Khaimah Half Marathon	Ras Al Khaimah, United Arab Emirates	1st	Half marathon	58:58
2020	Prague Half Marathon	Prague, Czech Republic	1st	Half marathon	58:38
2020	World Half Marathon Championships	Gdynia, Poland	2nd	Half marathon	58:54
2020	Valencia Half Marathon	Valencia, Spain	1st	Half marathon	57:32 WR
2021	Istanbul Half Marathon	Istanbul, Turkey	1st	Half marathon	59:32 CR
2022	Valencia Half Marathon	Valencia, Spain	1st	Half marathon	58:10
2023	World Cross Country Championships	Bathurst, Australia	5th	Senior race	29:57
2023	World Cross Country Championships	Bathurst, Australia	1st	Senior team	22 pts
2023	Valencia Half Marathon	Valencia, Spain	1st	Half marathon	57:40

=== Personal bests ===
- 10,000 metres – 27:20.34 (Birmingham 2022)
- 20,000 metres – 57:07.41 (Brussels 2022)
- One hour run – 20,940 m (Brussels 2022)

Road

- 10 kilometres – 26:50 (Herzogenaurach 2022)
- Half marathon – 57:32 (Valencia 2020) NR
- Marathon – 2:04:48 (Valencia 2023)

Records
Preceded by (Kenya) Geoffrey Kamworor	Men's half marathon world record holder 6 December 2020 – 21 November 2021	Succeeded by (Uganda) Jacob Kiplimo
