= Abraham Cheroben =

Bahraini long-distance runner

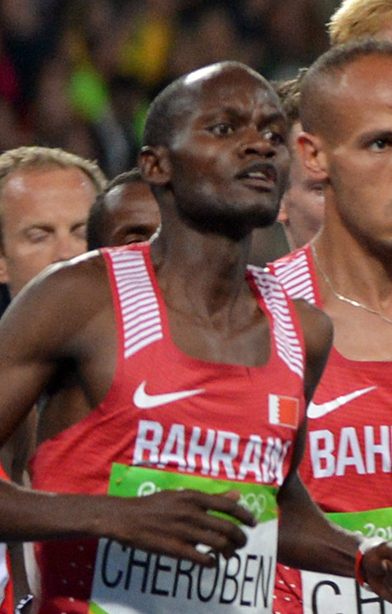
- Cheroben at the 2016 Olympics

Personal information
- Nationality: Bahraini
- Born: 11 October 1992 (age 33)
- Height: 176 cm (5 ft 9 in)
- Weight: 60 kg (132 lb)

Sport
- Sport: Athletics
- Event: 10–25 km

Achievements and titles
- Personal best: 10,000 m – 27:11.08 (2017)
Medal record
Men's athletics
Representing Bahrain
Asian Games
Gold medal – first place	2018 Jakarta	10,000 m
World Championships (HM)
Silver medal – second place	2018 Valencia	Individual
Bronze medal – third place	2018 Valencia	Team

Abraham Naibei Cheroben (born 11 October 1992) is a Kenyan born Bahraini long-distance runner who won the Valencia Half Marathon in 2014 and 2015. He finished tenth in the 10,000 m event at the 2016 Summer Olympics. In 2017 he won the Copenhagen Half in the 4th ever best time for a half marathon: 58.40 min.
