= Abel Kipchumba =

Kenyan long-distance runner

Personal information
- Nationality: Kenyan
- Born: Abel Kipchumba; 3 February 1994 (age 32)
- Occupation: long-distance runner
- Years active: 2017–present

Sport
- Country: Kenya
- Sport: Athletics
- Event(s): Marathon, Half marathon, 15 km

Achievements and titles
- Personal bests: 15 km: 41:55 (Valencia 2019); Half marathon: 58:07 (Valencia 2021); Marathon: 2:06:49 (Berlin 2022)

Abel Kipchumba (born 3 February 1994) is a Kenyan long-distance runner specializing in road racing events. He is known for his performances in the half marathon, where he holds a personal best of 58:07, and has also achieved top results in major marathons.

== Career ==
In 2019, Kipchumba won the Yangzhou Jianzhen International Half Marathon with a time of 59:56. He also ran a personal best of 59:22 at the Copenhagen Half Marathon the same year, and set a 15 km road personal best of 41:55 in Valencia.

On 24 October 2021, Kipchumba won the Valencia Half Marathon with a personal best time of 58:07, which made him one of the fastest half marathon runners in history.

In 2022, he made his marathon debut, finishing 5th at the Berlin Marathon with a time of 2:06:49.

In 2023, Kipchumba won the B.A.A. Half Marathon in Boston with a time of 1:01:32. He also competed in his first Boston Marathon, finishing 6th with a time of 2:09:47.

In 2024, he secured victories at two prominent half marathon events: the New York City Half Marathon with a time of 1:00:25, and the Great North Run in 59:52.

He defended his title at the New York City Half Marathon in March 2025, setting a new event record of 59:09.

== Results ==
Year	Race	Place	Position	Time
2019	Yangzhou Jianzhen International Half Marathon	Yangzhou	1st	59:56
2019	Copenhagen Half Marathon	Copenhagen	1st	59:22
2019	Valencia (15 km split)	Valencia	1st	41:55
2021	Valencia Half Marathon	Valencia	1st	58:07
2022	Berlin Marathon	Berlin	5th	2:06:49
2023	B.A.A. Half Marathon	Boston	1st	1:01:32
2023	Boston Marathon	Boston	6th	2:09:47
2024	New York City Half Marathon	New York	1st	1:00:25
2024	Great North Run	Newcastle	1st	59:52
2025	New York City Half Marathon	New York	1st	59:09
