= Ras Al Khaimah Half Marathon =

Road running event in the UAE

- Date: February 14th 2026
- Location: Ras Al Khaimah, United Arab Emirates
- Event type: Road running
- Distance: Half marathon - 10km - 5km
- Established: 2007
- Course records: Men: 57:56 (Uganda) Jacob Kiplimo (2022); Women: 1:04:14 (Ethiopia) Girmawit Gebrzihair (2022)
- Website: Ras Al Khaimah Half Marathon
- Participants: 10,595 Total participants in 2025 (The largest attendance in the history of the event)

Ras Al Khaimah Half Marathon is an annual half marathon held on Al Marjan Island in Ras Al Khaimah, United Arab Emirates.

== History ==
The first event, in 2007, saw Samuel Wanjiru breaking the world record, but Wanjiru himself set a new world record only a month later in another race. In the 2009 event Patrick Makau won by running what was, at the time, the second fastest half marathon ever.

Further sub-60-minute performances came in the men's race in 2010, but it was women's winner Elvan Abeylegesse who was the most impressive runner at the fourth edition: her time of 1:07:07 was not only the fastest ever for a debut half marathon run, but it also placed her as the sixth fastest ever woman over the distance. The race saw its first women's world record performance in 2011, as Mary Keitany became the first female under the 66-minute mark with her winning time of 1:05:50.

The 2013 saw a race first with three men under 59 minutes, while winner Geoffrey Kipsang was two seconds off the course record. The women's race re-wrote the all-time rankings as Lucy Kabuu ran the second fastest time ever to win in 66:09 minutes and Priscah Jeptoo and Rita Jeptoo (second and third) both entered the top five all-time fastest. Demonstrating significant depth, records for the fastest women's times by finishing position were broken from second place up to eleventh place.

In 2014 a record eight men finished under 60 minutes with Lelisa Desisa winning the race.

The 9th edition of the race in 2015 saw New York Marathon Champion Mary Keitany lead a high quality field, posting a time of 66:02 on the way to her third RAK title.

Birhanu Legese and Cynthia Limo won the 10th anniversary edition of the RAK Half Marathon in 2016. Limo's winning time of 66.04 was a personal best and put her 3rd on the official all time list behind only Florence Kiplagat and Mary Keitany. The first six women all broke 67 minutes with five recording personal bests, underlining RAK's status as the world's fastest half marathon.

The race's reputation as the world's fastest Half Marathon was cemented further in 2017 as the world record for the women’s half marathon was broken at the 11th edition by Peres Jepchirchir of Kenya, the previous year’s IAAF World Champion for the distance, who finished in 65:06, taking 3 seconds off the time of compatriot Florence Kiplagat. Behind her, three-time RAK champion Mary Keitany smashed her own best, and very nearly the old world record, with a 65:13 clocking, while Joyciline Jepkosgei ensured a Kenyan clean sweep, crossing the finish line in 66:08, a personal best by almost three minutes. In the men’s contest, IAAF World Half Marathon Championship silver medallist Bedan Karoki surged to victory over the last three kilometres, in a time of 59:10.

Two course records and a very near miss were the highlights of the 2018 edition of the race: Bedan Karoki won his second title in a time of 58:42, breaking Patrick Makau's course record that stood since 2009. In second place, Ethiopia's Jemal Yimer ran the fastest half marathon debut in history in 59:00. But it was once again the women's race that stole the show as Fancy Chemutai won the race in another course record time of 1:04:52, missing the World Record by one second. Behind her, Mary Keitany once again broke her own personal best in a time of 1:04:55.

The 2020 edition meant another women's world record, this time for Ababel Yeshaneh, who finished the race in 1:04:31, 20 seconds faster than Joyciline Jepkosgei's record from 2017. The men's race was won by Kibiwott Kandie.

== Winners ==
Key: Course record

Year	Men's winner	Time (min:sec)	Women's winner	Time (h:m:s)
2007	Samuel Wanjiru (KEN)	58:53 (WR)	Berhane Adere (ETH)	1:10:58
2008	Patrick Makau (KEN)	59:35	Salina Kosgei (KEN)	1:12:29
2009	Patrick Makau (KEN)	58:52	Dire Tune (ETH)	1:07:18
2010	Geoffrey Mutai (KEN)	59:43	Elvan Abeylegesse (TUR)	1:07:07
2011	Deriba Merga (ETH)	59:25	Mary Keitany (KEN)	1:05:50 (WR)
2012	Dennis Kipruto (KEN)	1:00:40	Mary Keitany (KEN)	1:06:49
2013	Geoffrey Kamworor (KEN)	58:54	Lucy Kabuu (KEN)	1:06:09
2014	Lelisa Desisa (ETH)	59:36	Priscah Jeptoo (KEN)	1:07:02
2015	Mosinet Geremew (ETH)	1:00:05	Mary Keitany (KEN)	1:06:02
2016	Birhanu Legese (ETH)	1:00:40	Cynthia Limo (KEN)	1:06:04
2017	Bedan Karoki (KEN)	59:10	Peres Jepchirchir (KEN)	1:05:06 (WR)
2018	Bedan Karoki (KEN)	58:42	Fancy Chemutai (KEN)	1:04:52
2019	Stephen Kiprop (KEN)	58:42	Senbere Teferi (ETH)	1:05:45
2020	Kibiwott Kandie (KEN)	58:58	Ababel Yeshaneh (ETH)	1:04:31 (WR)
2021	Not Held			
2022	Jacob Kiplimo (UGA)	57:56	Girmawit Gebrzihair (ETH)	1:04:14
2023	Benard Kibet (KEN)	58:45	Hellen Obiri (KEN)	1:05:05
2024	Daniel Mateiko (KEN)	58:45	Tsigie Gebreselama (ETH)	1:05:14
2025	Alex Matata (KEN)	59:20	Ejgayehu Taye (ETH)	1:05:52
