= Abraham Kiptum =

Kenyan long-distance runner

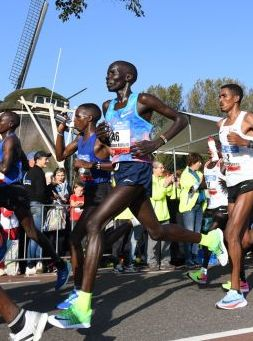
- Abraham Kiptum running the Amsterdam Marathon in 2017

Personal information
- Nationality: Kenyan
- Born: 15 September 1989 (age 36) Nandi County, Kenya

Sport
- Sport: Track
- Event(s): 5000 metres, 10,000 metres, Half Marathon, Marathon
- Coached by: Joshua Kiprugut Kemei

Achievements and titles
- Personal best(s): 10,000 metres: 27:44^{*} 10K run: 29:18; Half marathon: 59:09

Abraham Kiptum (born 5 September 1989) is a Kenyan long-distance runner and former half marathon world record holder. On 28 October 2018 Kiptum ran the Valencia Half Marathon in Valencia, Spain in a time of 58:18, which would have been a world record (world record 58:23), but in 2019 this world record was nullified, because of a doping violation verdict in 2019. The half marathon world record was then improved by Geoffrey Kipsang Kamworor on 15 September 2019, to a time of 58:01.

Kiptum's debut in the marathon was the Rabat Marathon in 2015, where he placed third with a time of 2:11:36. In the inaugural Abu Dhabi Marathon on 7 December 2018, he finished as the runner-up with 2:04:16, 12 seconds behind the winner Marius Kipserem. He improved his PB from the 2017 Amsterdam Marathon by 70 seconds.

On 26 April 2019 The Athletics Integrity Unit confirmed a Provisional Suspension against Kiptum for an Athlete Biological Passport (ABP) violation under the IAAF Anti-Doping Rules. Kiptum was withdrawn from the 2019 London Marathon in consequence of the suspension. On 11 November that year, a four-year suspension, and expunging of results, was confirmed. Kiptum's race times going back to 13 October 2018 were nullified.

== Personal life ==
Abraham Kiptum was born in Chepketei Kosirai Village, Kenya as the third of four children. Kiptum went to Kosirai Primary School and Kipmokoch Secondary School. He is coached by Joshua Kiprugut Kemei.

== Competition record ==
=== Road running ===
Year	Road Race	Distance	Location	Rank	Time
2016	Lagos City Marathon	Marathon	Lagos	1st	2:16:19
2016	Casablanca Half Marathon	Half Marathon	Casablanca	1st	1:01:26
2016	Madrid Half Marathon	Half Marathon	Madrid	1st	1:01:52
2017	Amsterdam Marathon	Marathon	Amsterdam	3rd	2:05:26
2018	Daegu Marathon	Marathon	Daegu	1st	2:06:29
2018	Copenhagen Half Marathon	Half Marathon	Copenhagen	2nd	59:09
2018	Valencia Half Marathon	Half Marathon	Valencia	DQ	~~58:18 WR~~
2018	Abu Dhabi Marathon	Marathon	Abu Dhabi	DQ	~~2:04:16~~
