= Yomif Kejelcha =

Ethiopian long-distance runner (born 1997)

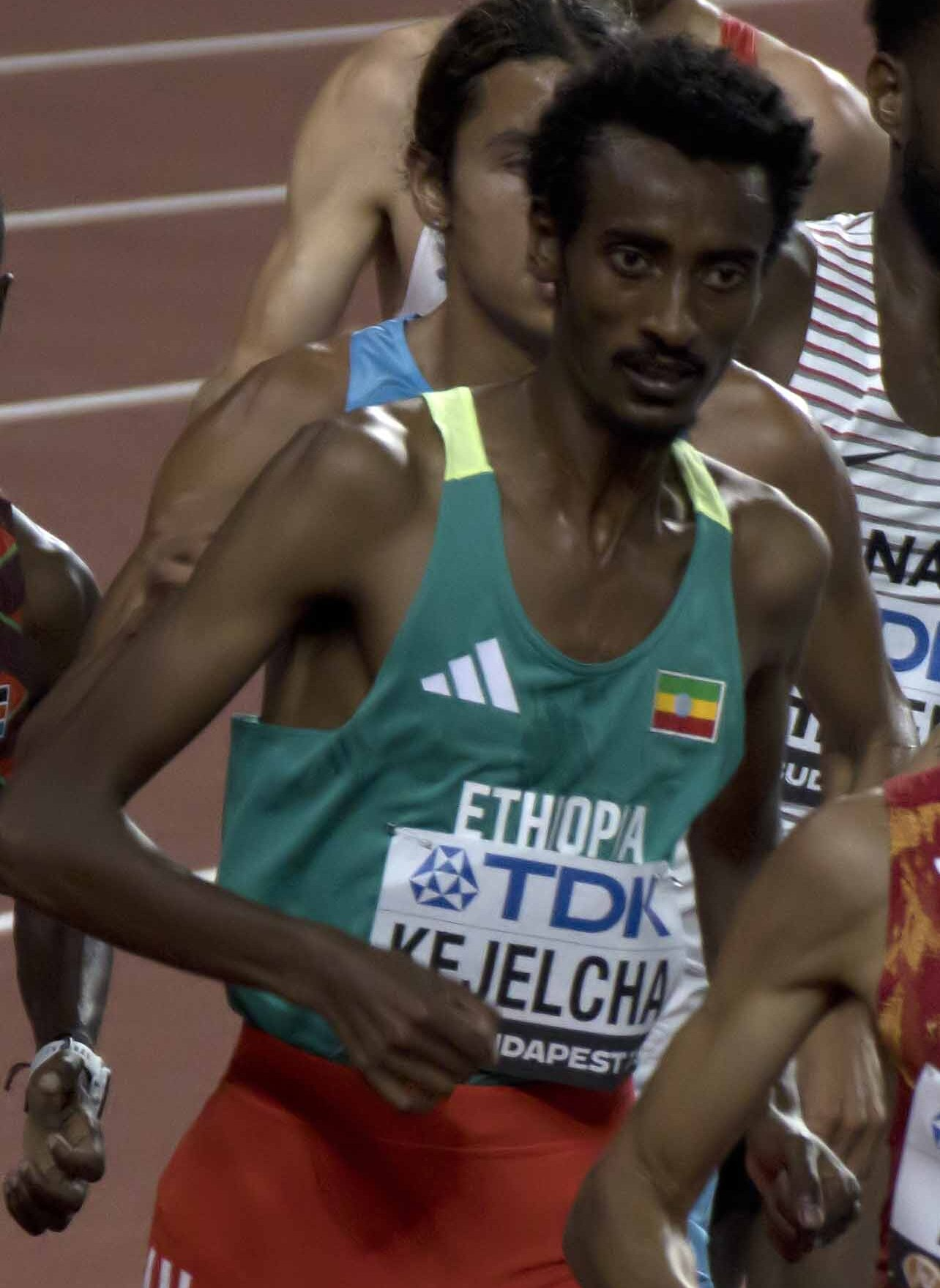
- Yomif in 2023

Personal information
- Native name: ዮሚፍ ቀጄልቻ
- Full name: Yomif Kejelcha Atomsa
- Born: 1 August 1997 (age 29) Showa, Oromia, Ethiopia
- Agent: Mónica Pont
- Height: 1.85 m (6 ft 1 in)
- Weight: 58 kg (128 lb)

Sport
- Country: Ethiopia
- Sport: Athletics
- Event: Long-distance running
- Club: Oromia Construction & Engineering Corporation Athletics Club
- Team: Adidas
- Coached by: Tim Rowberry (Nike Oregon Project); Nigatu Worku; Gemedu Dedefo (present)

Achievements and titles
- Personal bests: Outdoors; 1500 m: 3:32.59 (Zagreb 2018); Mile: 3:58.24 (Stanford 2019); 3000 m: 7:23.64 (Eugene 2023); 5000 m: 12:38.95 (Oslo 2024); 10,000 m: 26:31.01 (Nerja 2024); Indoors; 1000 m: 2:18.34i (Seattle 2019); 1500 m: 3:31.25i+ (Boston 2019); Mile: 3:47.01i (Boston 2019); 2000 m: 4:57.74i WU20B (Metz 2014); 3000 m: 7:38.67i (Karlsruhe 2018); Road; 5 km: 12:50 (Lille 2023); 10 km: 26:31 WR (Castellón 2025); Half Marathon: 56:51 WR (Buenos Aires 2026); Marathon: 1:59:41 NR (London 2026)
Medal record
Men's athletics
Representing Ethiopia
World Championships
| Silver medal – second place | 2019 Doha | 10,000 m |
| Silver medal – second place | 2025 Tokyo | 10,000 m |
World Indoor Championships
| Gold medal – first place | 2016 Portland | 3000 m |
| Gold medal – first place | 2018 Birmingham | 3000 m |
World Road Running Championships
| Silver medal – second place | 2023 Riga | 5K |
Diamond League
| First place | 2015 | 5000 m |
World Marathon Majors
| Silver medal – second place | 2026 London | Marathon |
World Junior Championships
| Gold medal – first place | 2014 Eugene | 5000 m |
African Junior Championships
| Gold medal – first place | 2015 Addis Ababa | 5000 m |
Youth Olympic Games
| Gold medal – first place | 2014 Nanjing | 3000 m |
World Youth Championships
| Gold medal – first place | 2013 Donetsk | 3000 m |
African Youth Games
| Gold medal – first place | 2014 Gaborone | 3000 m |

Yomif Kejelcha Atomsa (Amharic: ዮሚፍ ቀጄልቻ; born 1 August 1997) is an Ethiopian long-distance runner who holds the world records in the half marathon and 10 km road race. He is also a former world record holder in the short track mile run. At the 2026 London Marathon, Kejelcha finished second in 1:59:41 on his marathon debut, becoming the second athlete, after Sabastian Sawe, to break the two-hour barrier in a record-eligible marathon.

On the track, Kejelcha won the silver medal in the 10,000 metres at the 2019 World Athletics Championships and consecutive gold medals in the 3000 metres at the 2016 and 2018 World Indoor Championships. Earlier in his career, he won the 3000 m at the 2013 World Youth Championships in Athletics and the 5000 metres at the 2014 World Junior Championships in Athletics.

== Early life ==
Yomif was born on 1 August 1997 in Showa, Oromia, Ethiopia. His father is Kejelcha Atoma, and his mother is Biritu Negese. He is the fifth of nine children.

Yomif was introduced to athletics by his friend Abebe Dribsa. Against his father's wishes, Yomif dropped out of high school in the ninth grade to pursue running, leading to his expulsion from home. Yomif secured school clearance to apply for the police force, and returned home at the suggestion of his mother. Yomif joined the Burayu Kenema Club, and moved to the outskirts of Addis Ababa to train.

== Running career ==
=== 2013: World Youth 3000m Champion ===
Yomif made his international debut at the 2013 World Youth Championships in Donetsk, winning gold in the boys' 3000 metres with a time of 7:53.56.

=== 2014: World Junior 5000m Champion ===
In June, Yomif placed second over 3000 m in 7:36.28 at the Ostrava Golden Spike elite meeting, losing only to Kenya's Caleb Ndiku; he defeated 2008 Olympic medallist Nick Willis and former world champion Bernard Lagat. Yomif won the 5000 metres at the World Junior Championships held in July in Eugene that year, running 13:25.19. He also won gold in the 3000 m at the Youth Olympic Games in Nanjing later that summer. He finished 2014 as the world youth leader at both the 3000 and 5000 metres, and world junior leader at 3000 metres.

=== 2015: World Championship 5000m 4th place ===
Yomif opened his 2015 season at the African Junior Championships in Addis Ababa, winning the 5000 m in a time of 14:31.03. He made his IAAF Diamond League debut in Doha, placing fifth in the 3000 m. He then won a non-Diamond Race 5000 m event at the Prefontaine Classic in Eugene, improving his personal best to 13:10.54 and outkicking Edwin Soi and Galen Rupp. Yomif scored his first Diamond League victory the following week at the Golden Gala in Rome, winning 5000 m in a world-leading 12:58.39 and breaking 13 minutes for the first time. On 11 September, Yomif competed in the event at the Brussels Diamond League, setting a new personal best and world-leading time of 12:53.98.

=== 2016: World Indoor 3000m Champion ===
He started 2016 by winning the gold in the 3000 metres at the World Indoor Championships in Portland. On 27 August, Yomif won the event at the Diamond League Paris meet in a new world U20 record of 7:28.19.

=== 2018: World Indoor 3000m Champion ===
At the European Athletics Outdoor Classic Permit Meeting in Sweden on 18 August, Yomif won the 3000 m with a time of 7:28.00. On 31 August, he placed third in the 5000 m at the Diamond League Brussels Final. He ran a personal best of 12:46.79, making him the seventh-fastest runner ever in the event.

=== 2019: World Championship 10,000m Silver ===
Yomif came within a hundredth of a second of Hicham El Guerrouj's world indoor mile record on 9 February at the Millrose Games. He ran an Ethiopian national record and a Millrose meet record of 3:48.46, making him second-fastest athlete of all time in the event. On 3 March, Yomif broke this record with a time of 3:47.01, slicing 1.44 seconds off El Guerrouj's mark set in 1997 (this record was later broken by Yared Nuguse of the United States in February 2025, running 3:46.63). He came short of the 1500 metres world indoor record with his 3:31.25 split en route, making him the third-fastest indoor performer in history. He was paced by Erik Sowinski, Christian Harrison, and Harun Abda.

Yomif won the silver medal for the 10,000 metres at the 2019 World Athletics Championships held in Doha, Qatar, finished eighth in the event at the delayed 2020 Tokyo Olympics in 2021, and placed also eighth in the 5000 m at the 2022 World Athletics Championships in Eugene.

Yomif was a member of the Nike Oregon Project from 2018 to 2019, where he trained alongside Galen Rupp and Sifan Hassan.

=== 2020: COVID year ===
In 2020, Kejelcha ran three races: he placed 5th at the Monaco Diamond League 1500m in 3:32.69 and 8th in 3:35.96 at the Golden Spike Ostrava meeting, then won a 5000m race in Hengelo in 13:12.84.

=== 2023: World Championship 5000m 5th ===
On 19 March, he missed Berihu Aregawi's 5 kilometres world record of 12:49 by just one second in Lille, France to move up to second on the world all-time list.

On 2 June, at the Golden Gala meeting in Florence, Yomif narrowly finished second to Mohamed Katir over the 5000 metres, in a time of 12:52.12, losing to Katir by only 0.03 seconds. On June 15, Yomif won the 5000 metres at the Bislett Games in Oslo in a time of 12:41.73, the fifth-fastest time in 5000 metre history. Finishing second to Yomif was Jacob Kiplimo, who lost by 0.003 seconds in one of the smallest margins in distance running history (12:41.725 to 12:41.728, making them the joint fifth fastest 5000 metre runners in history at the time).

At the end of the 2023 outdoor season, on 17 September, Yomif competed in the 3000 metres at the Diamond League Final (Prefontaine Classic) in Eugene. He finished second to Jakob Ingebrigtsen, in a time of 7:23.64, losing by only one hundredth of a second. At the time, this was the fourth fastest men's 3000m performance in history, behind Ingebrigtsen's 7:23.63, Hicham El Guerrouj's 7:23.09, and Daniel Komen's world record of 7:20.67.

=== 2024: Olympic 10,000m 6th, Half Marathon World Record ===
On 30 May, Yomif contested the 5000 metres at the Oslo Diamond League, finishing second to compatriot Hagos Gebrhiwet. Hagos ran 12:36.73 to become the second fastest man in history at the 5000 metre distance, behind Joshua Cheptegei's world record of 12:35.36, while Yomif finished in a time of 12:38.95, becoming the fourth fastest 5000 metre runner in history, behind Kenenisa Bekele (12:37.35), Hagos, and Cheptegei.

After exchanging leads with his teammates for most of the race, Yomif finished sixth in the 2024 Olympic 10,000 m.

On 27 October, in the 2024 Valencia Half Marathon, Yomif set a new half marathon world record of 57:30, breaking Jacob Kiplimo's former half marathon world record of 57:31 by one second. In 2025, Kiplimo broke Yomif's record by 10 seconds, running 57:20.

=== 2025: World Championship 10,000m Silver ===
On 16 February, Kejelcha ran 26:31 at Spain's 10K Facsa Castellón. His time was later ratified as a world record after Rhonex Kipruto was stripped of his previous world record time set at the 2020 Valencia 10k due to doping.

Kejecha ran three Diamond League races, placing 8th in Bislett in 12:49.07 and winning in 12:47.84 in Paris and 12:49.46 in Monaco.

At the 2025 World Athletics Championships, Kejelcha won silver in the 10,000m behind Jimmy Gressier of France.

In October, Kejelcha defended his title at the Valencia Half Marathon, running 58:02.

=== 2026: Sub-2 hour Marathon debut, Half Marathon World Record ===
On 26 April, Yomif ran his first ever marathon in the 2026 London Marathon, setting a debut time of 1:59:41, which now stands as the fastest debut marathon ever run, the second fastest in marathon history and the second-ever marathon under two hours under record-eligible conditions. He finished 2nd behind Sabastian Sawe (1:59:30) and ahead of Jacob Kiplimo (2:00:28). All three men finished under Kelvin Kiptum's previous world record of 2:00:35. He was coached by Ethiopian distance coach Gemedu Dedefo for the race.

On 23 August, Kejelcha set a new half marathon world record at the Buenos Aires Half Marathon, winning in 56:51. His time improved Jacob Kiplimo's previous world record of 57:20 by 29 seconds.

== Personal life ==
Yomif married Yadu Birhanu Biru in 2022. Yomif is an avid fan of the English Premier League football team Chelsea.

Yomif's running hero is compatriot Kenenisa Bekele, a four time Olympic medallist. He trains daily, running between 120 and 140 miles a week. He often trains alongside Telahun Haile Bekele, Hagos Gebrhiwet and Birhanu Balew.

== Achievements ==
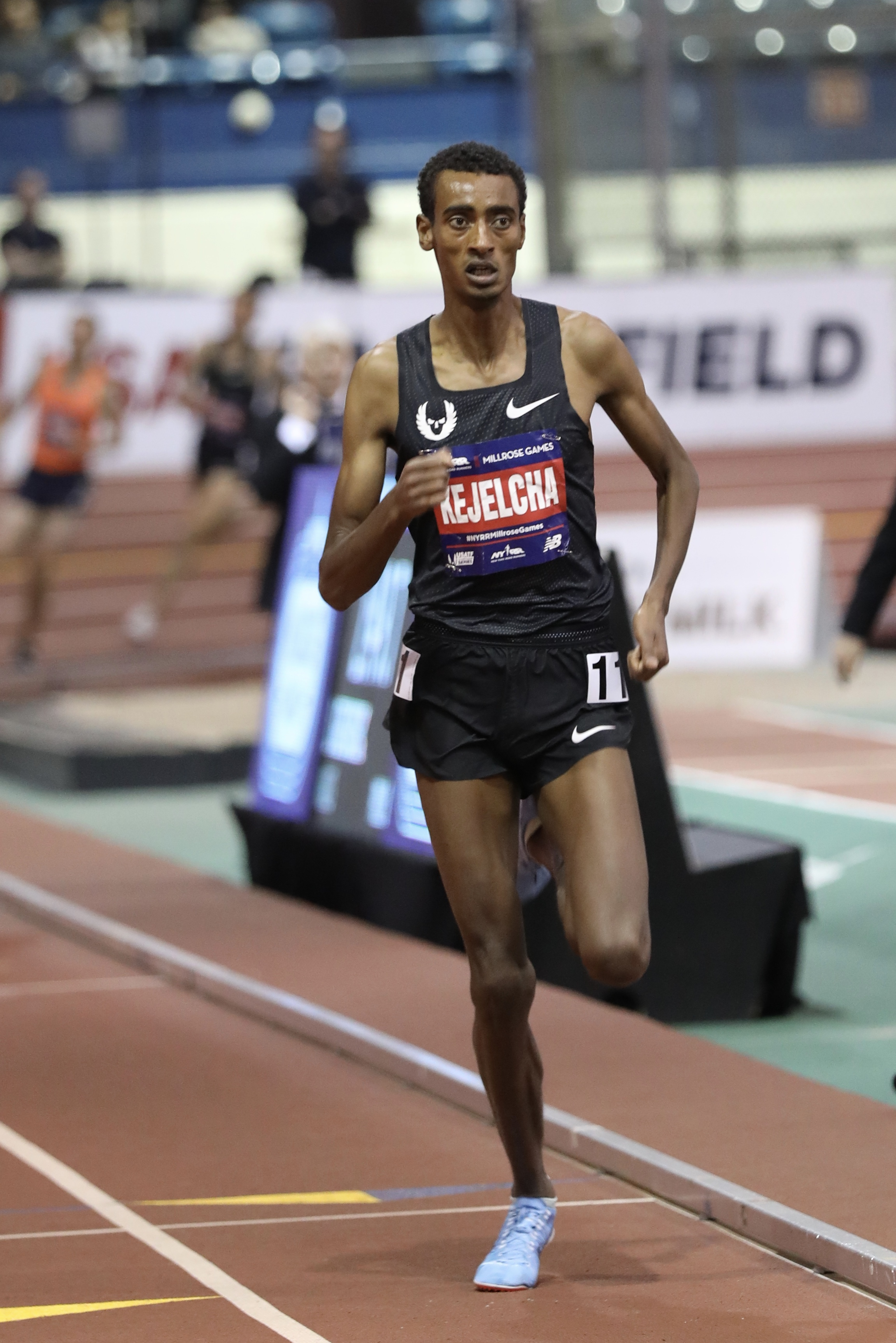
Yomif at the 2019 Millrose Games

All information from World Athletics profile.

=== International competitions ===
Representing Ethiopia
| Year | Competition | Venue | Position | Event | Time |
|---|---|---|---|---|---|
| 2013 | World Youth Championships | Donetsk, Ukraine | 1st | 3000 m | 7:53.56 |
| 2014 | African Youth Games | Gaborone, Botswana | 1st | 3000 m | 7:56.51 |
| 2014 | World Junior Championships | Eugene, United States | 1st | 5000 m | 13:25.19 |
| 2014 | Youth Olympic Games | Nanjing, China | 1st | 3000 m | 7:56.20 |
| 2015 | African Junior Championships | Addis Ababa, Ethiopia | 1st | 5000 m | 14:31.03 |
| 2015 | World Championships | Beijing, China | 4th | 5000 m | 13:52.43 |
| 2016 | World Indoor Championships | Portland, United States | 1st | 3000 m | 7:57.21 |
| 2017 | World Championships | London, United Kingdom | 4th | 5000 m | 13:33.51 |
| 2018 | World Indoor Championships | Birmingham, United Kingdom | 1st | 3000 m | 8:14.41 |
| 2019 | World Championships | Doha, Qatar | 2nd | 10,000 m | 26:49.34 |
| 2021 | Olympic Games | Tokyo, Japan | 8th | 10,000 m | 27:52.03 |
| 2022 | World Championships | Eugene, United States | 8th | 5000 m | 13:12.09 |
| 2023 | World Championships | Budapest, Hungary | 5th | 5000 m | 13:12.51 |
| 2024 | Olympic Games | Paris, France | 5th | 10,000 m | 26:44.02 |
| 2025 | World Championships | Tokyo, Japan | 2nd | 10,000 m | 28:55.83 |

=== Road Races ===
Representing Ethiopia
| Year | Competition | Venue | Position | Event | Time |
|---|---|---|---|---|---|
| 2021 | Diamond League Final | Zurich | 5th | 5km | 13:05 |
| 2022 | adizero: Road to Records | Herzogenaurach | 1st | 5km | 12:53 |
| 2023 | Lille Half Marathon | Lille | 1st | 5km | 12:50 |
| 2023 | adizero: Road to Records | Herzogenaurach | 2nd | 5km | 13:06 |
| 2023 | World Athletics Road Running Championships | Riga | 2nd | 5km | 13:02 |
| 2024 | adizero: Road to Records | Herzogenaurach | 1st | 5km | 13:00 |
| 2025 | adizero: Road to Records | Herzogenaurach | 1st | 5km | 12:54 |

=== Personal bests ===
- All statistics from World Athletics Profile unless otherwise noted with a citation.

| Category | Event | Time | Venue | Date | Notes |
|---|---|---|---|---|---|
| Outdoor Track | 1500 m | 3:32.59 | Zagreb | 4 September 2018 | |
| Outdoor Track | Mile | 3:58.24 | Stanford | 30 June 2019 | |
| Outdoor Track | 3000 m | 7:23.64 | Eugene | 17 September 2023 | 5th all time |
| Outdoor Track | 5000 m | 12:38.95 | Oslo | 30 May 2024 | 4th all time |
| Outdoor Track | 10,000 m | 26:31.01 | Nerja | 14 June 2024 | 7th all time |
| Indoor Track | 1000 m | 2:18.34 | Seattle | 12 January 2019 | |
| Indoor Track | 1500 m | 3:31.25+ | Boston | 3 March 2019 | En route to mile |
| Indoor Track | Mile | 3:47.01 | Boston | 3 March 2019 | 4th all time |
| Indoor Track | 2000 m | 4:57.74 | Metz | 28 February 2014 | WU20B |
| Indoor Track | 3000 m | 7:38.67 | Karlsruhe | 3 February 2018 | |
| Road | 5 km | 12:50 | Lille | 19 March 2023 | 2nd all time |
| Road | 10 km | 26:31 | Castellón de la Plana | 16 February 2025 | WR |
| Road | Half marathon | 56:51 | Buenos Aires | 23 August 2026 | WR (waiting for ratification) |
| Road | Marathon | 1:59:41 | London | 26 April 2026 | 2nd all time and debut record |

=== Circuit wins and titles ===
- Diamond League Overall 5000m Diamond Race Title: 2015
  - 2015 (3) (5000m): Eugene Prefontaine Classic, Rome Golden Gala (WL), Brussels Memorial Van Damme (WL)
  - 2016 (1) (3000m): Paris Meeting (WU20R WL)
  - 2018 (1) (3000m): Rabat Mohammed VI Meeting International (WL MR)
  - 2019 (2) (5000m): Shanghai IAAF Diamond League (WL), Lausanne Athletissima (SB)
  - 2021 (1) (3000m): Oslo Bislett Games (PB WL DLR)
  - 2023 (2) (5000m): Oslo (WL MR PB), Zürich Weltklasse

Records
| Preceded by (Morocco) Hicham El Guerrouj | Men's Mile World Indoor Record Holder; 3 March 2019 – | Succeeded by Incumbent |
