= Irine Jepchumba Kimais =

Kenyan athlete

Personal information
- Nationality: Kenyan
- Born: 10 October 1998 (age 27)

Sport
- Sport: Athletics
- Event(s): 5000m, 10,000m

Achievements and titles
- Personal best(s): 5000m: 15:29.74 (Wuhan, 2019); 10,000m: 30:37.24 (Hengelo, 2021)

Irine Jepchumba Kimais (born 10 October 1998) is a Kenyan long-distance runner.

== Career ==
Running for the Kenyan Defence Force, she ran 32:23.11 to qualify for the 2019 African Games in the 10,000m in Rabat in August 2019. In March 2022, she won the half marathon in Rome, running 1:06:03, the fastest half marathon ever ran on Italian soil by a woman. In August 2022, she won the Buenos Aires half marathon.

In February 2023, she set a new half marathon personal best, running 1:04:37 in Barcelona to set a new course record. She then won the half marathon in Prague in April 2023, running 1:06:00. She also set a new 10 km personal best, when she ran 30:23 in Herzogenaurach, Germany in April 2023.

In June 2023 she won the Kenyan national title over 10,000 metres in Nairobi. She was subsequently selected for the 2023 World Athletics Championships in Budapest.
