= Valencia Half Marathon =

Annual race in Spain held since 1988

- Date: October
- Location: Valencia, Spain
- Event type: Road
- Distance: Half marathon
- Primary sponsor: EDP
- Established: 1988 (38 years ago); 2006 (20 years ago) (as half)
- Course records: Men: 57:30 (2024) (Ethiopia) Yomif Kejelcha; Women: 1:02:52 (2021) (Ethiopia) Letesenbet Gidey
- Website: Valencia Half Marathon
- Participants: 20,000 (2022), 8,842 finishers (2021); 15,356 (2019); 13,799 (2018)

The Valencia Half Marathon (Spanish: Medio Maratón de Valencia) is an annual half marathon road running event held in Valencia, Spain, since 1988. It is categorized as a Gold Label Road Race by World Athletics. The race is organised by the Valencian sports club SD Correcaminos, which also organises the annual Valencia Marathon.

The race attracts top level elite competitors from Kenya, Ethiopia and Morocco, as well as runners from the host country Spain. Since 2022 the Valencia Half Marathon is part of the Superhalfs Series, and therefore attracts ordinary runners from all over the world.

== History ==
The event was initially founded as a race of 20 km (12 mi), called the "20 kilómetros Adidas", with the inaugural race taking place in 1988. From 1993 to 1995, the race was not contested for reasons beyond the organizer's control.

The race was later lengthened to a half marathon, beginning with the 2006 edition of the race. The change coincided with a growth in the number of participants and a higher standard of elite level competition. A record 9328 runners from over 10,300 entrants finished the race in October 2013.

On 30 July 2020, the race organizer announced the cancellation of the 2020 in-person edition of the race due to the coronavirus pandemic, with all registrants given the option of transferring their entry to 2021 or obtaining a full refund. About a month later, on 10 September, the organizer announced that the Valencia Marathon (which it also organized and whose mass race was just cancelled days earlier) would hold an "Elite Edition" of the race on 6 December, and that it would also include a half marathon race that year. On the day of the race, four half marathon runners broke the previous world record of 58:01, with Kenyan Kibiwott Kandie setting a new world record of 57:32.

On 24 October 2021, Letesenbet Gidey ran a time of 1:02:52, breaking Ruth Chepn'getich's previous world record of 1:04:02 by over one minute.

On 27 October 2024, Yomif Kejelcha ran a time of 57:30 to break Jacob Kiplimo's previous world record of 57:31 set in 2021.

== Course ==
External image
- Course map of half marathon in 2019

The half marathon starts and finishes on Carrer d'Antonio Ferrandis about 1 km (0.62 mi) southwest of the City of Arts and Sciences.

The course first crosses the City of Arts and Sciences before making a loop around the Camins al Grau and Algirós districts for the first third of the race. The half marathon then largely follows the roads along the Garden of the Turia as it makes its way northwest to Ciutat Vella and then back to the start.

== Winners ==
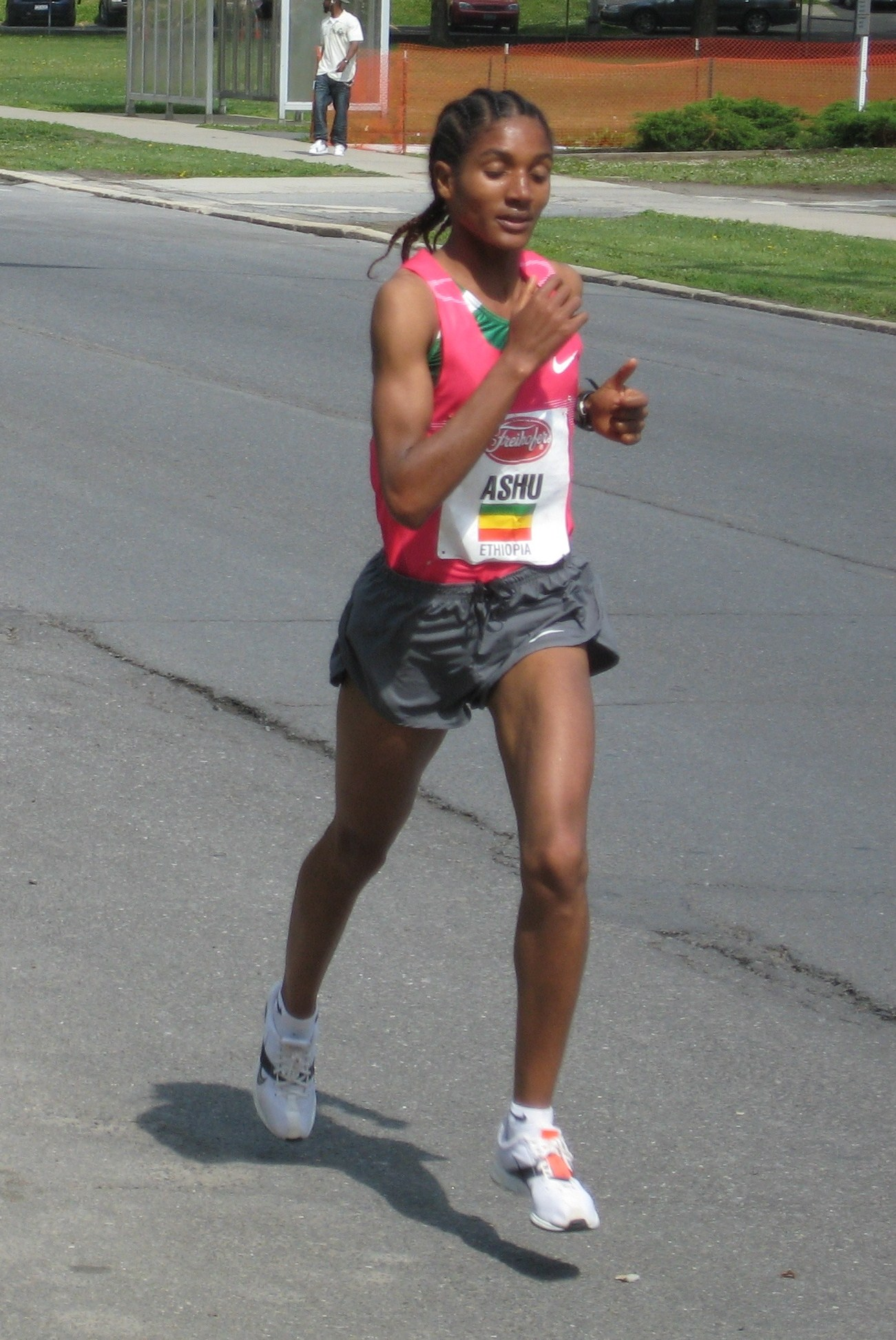
2005 winner Ethiopian Ashu Kasim (pictured here at a 5K in Albany)

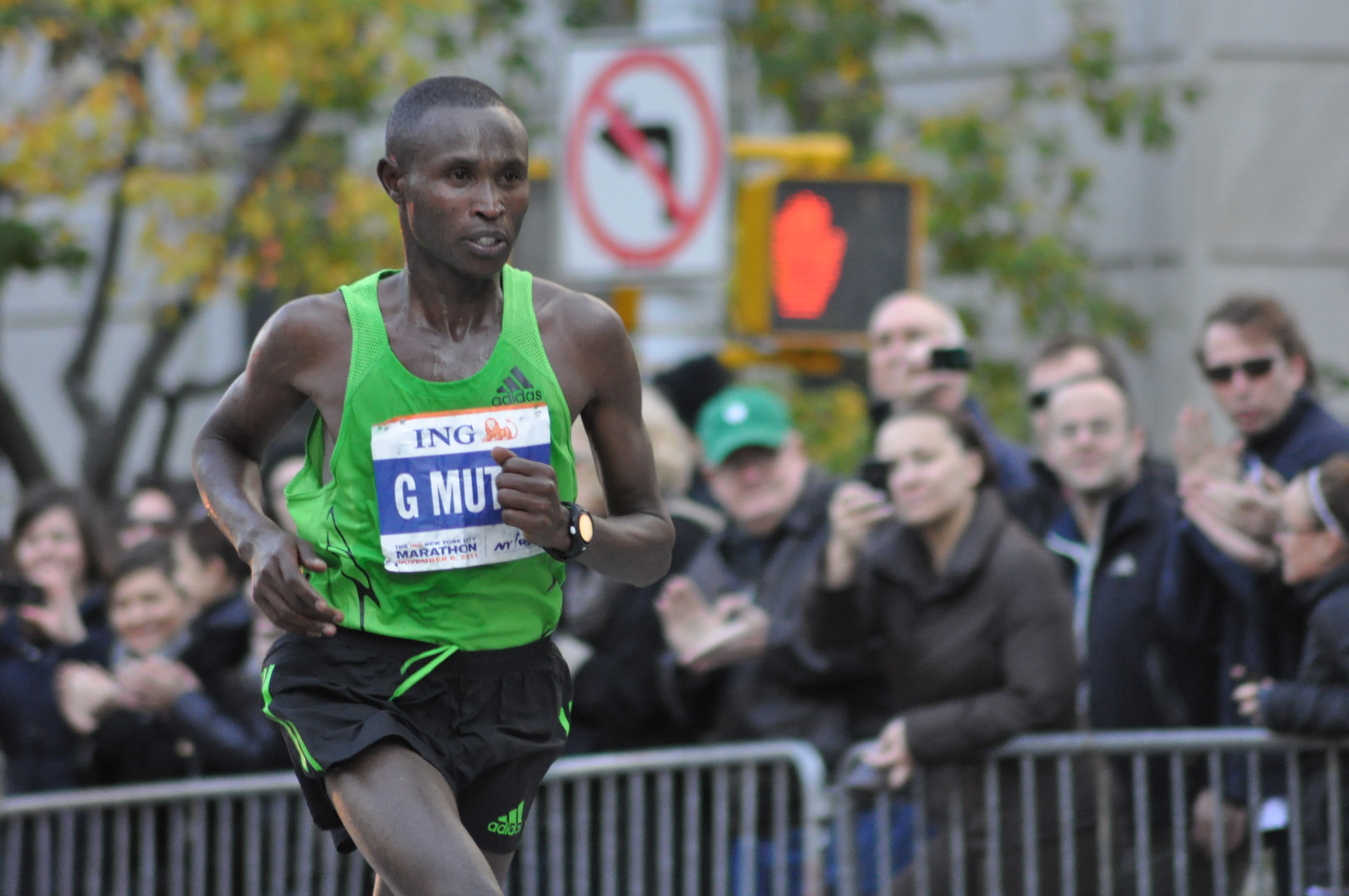
2009 winner Kenyan Geoffrey Mutai (pictured here at the NYC Marathon)

The course records for the half marathon are 57:30 for the men's race (set by Yomif Kejelcha in 2024) and 1:02:52 for the women's race (which is also the current world record, set by Letesenbet Gidey in 2021). The latter time is the women's all-comers record for the event in Spain.

Key: Course record (in bold)

=== 20K ===
| Ed. | Year | Men's winner | Time | Women's winner | Time | Rf. |
|---|---|---|---|---|---|---|
| — | — | not held from 1993 to 1995 | | | | |
| 10 | 2000 | Enock Keter (KEN) | 1:00:44 | Margaret Ngadi (TZA) | 1:13:19 | |
| 11 | 2001 | Julio Rey (ESP) | 1:01:43 | Teresa Gracia (ESP) | 1:25:36 | |
| 12 | 2002 | Julio Rey (ESP) | 59:46 | Margareth Iro (TAN) | 1:11:08 | |
| 13 | 2003 | El Houssine Essemaali (MAR) | 1:02:39 | Sandra Ruales (ECU) | 1:11:09 | |
| 14 | 2004 | Sawel Kalia (KEN) | 1:01:33 | Gladys Cherono (KEN) | 1:10:28 | |
| 15 | 2005 | Abdellatif Meftah (MAR) | 1:00:46 | Ashu Kasim (ETH) | 1:09:30 | |

=== Half marathon ===
| Ed. | Year | Men's winner | Time | Women's winner | Time | Rf. |
|---|---|---|---|---|---|---|
| 16 | 2006 | Edwin Koech (KEN) | 1:02:48 | Joan Aiyabei (KEN) | 1:12:48 | |
| 17 | 2007 | Peter Korir (KEN) | 1:02:24 | Joan Aiyabei (KEN) | 1:11:16 | |
| 18 | 2008 | Jacob Yator (KEN) | 1:01:32 | Sarah Kerubo (KEN) | 1:15:18 | |
| 19 | 2009 | Geoffrey Mutai (KEN) | 59:30 | Beatrice Jepchumba (KEN) | 1:15:31 | |
| 20 | 2010 | John Mwangangi (KEN) | 1:01:10 | Joyce Chepkirui (KEN) | 1:09:25 | |
| 21 | 2011 | John Mwangangi (KEN) | 59:45 | Malika Asahssah (MAR) | 1:10:26 | |
| 22 | 2012 | Joel Kimurer (KEN) | 59:36 | Alice Mogire (KEN) | 1:09:57 | |
| 23 | 2013 | Jacob Kendagor (KEN) | 59:58 | Joyce Chepkirui (KEN) | 1:08:15 | |
| 24 | 2014 | Abraham Cheroben (KEN) | 58:48 | Emily Chebet (KEN) | 1:08:01 | |
| 25 | 2015 | Abraham Cheroben (KEN) | 59:10 | Netsanet Gudeta (ETH) | 1:07:31 | |
| 26 | 2016 | Stephen Kibet (KEN) | 59:27 | Peres Jepchirchir (KEN) | 1:07:09 | |
| 27 | 2017 | Abraham Cheroben (BHR) | 59:11 | Joyciline Jepkosgei (KEN) | 1:04:51 | |
| 28 | 2018 | Jemal Yimer (ETH) (Note: Abraham Kiptum originally won with a world record time of 58:18, but was later disqualified for doping.) | 58:33 | Gelete Burka (ETH) | 1:06:11 | |
| 29 | 2019 | Yomif Kejelcha (ETH) | 59:05 | Senbere Teferi (ETH) | 1:05:32 | |
| 30 | 2020 | Kibiwott Kandie (KEN) | 57:32 | Genzebe Dibaba (ETH) | 1:05:18 | |
| 31 | 2021 | Abel Kipchumba (KEN) | 58:07 | Letesenbet Gidey (ETH) | **1:02:52** **WR** | |
| 32 | 2022 | Kibiwott Kandie (KEN) | 58:11 | Konstanze Klosterhalfen (GER) | 1:05:41 | |
| 33 | 2023 | Kibiwott Kandie (KEN) | 57:40 | Margaret Chelimo Kipkemboi (KEN) | 1:04:46 | |
| 34 | 2024 | Yomif Kejelcha (ETH) | **57:30** | Agnes Ngetich (KEN) | 1:03:04 | |
| 35 | 2025 | Yomif Kejelcha (ETH) | 58:02 | Agnes Ngetich (KEN) | 1:03:08 | |
| 36 | 2026 | Rodrigue Kwizera (ESP) | 58:03 | Sheila Chepkirui (KEN) | 1:03:51 | |
