= Aron Kifle =

Eritrean long-distance runner

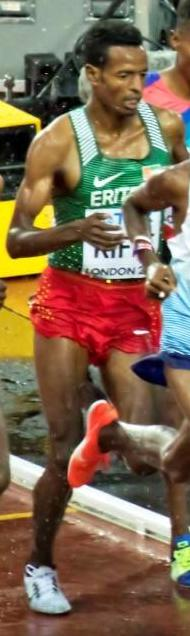
- Aron Kifle in 2017

Personal information
- Born: 20 February 1998 (age 28)

Sport
- Sport: Track and field
- Event: 5000 metres
Medal record
Men's athletics
Representing Eritrea
World Championships (HM)
Bronze medal – third place	2018 Valencia	Individual

Aron Kifle Teklu (born 20 February 1998) is an Eritrean long-distance runner. He is the bronze medallist from the 2018 World Half Marathon Championships in Valencia. Aron is also the silver medallist in the 10000m from both the 2016 World U20 Championships and the 2019 All-African Games.

== Biography ==
=== 2015-2017 ===
Aron (Kifle is his father's name) began competing internationally in 2015. On 28 March, he raced in the U20 race at the 2015 World Cross Country Championships in Guiyang, China, placing 19th. Aron finished 11th in his heat of the 5000m at the 2015 World Championships in Athletics, not qualifying for the final.

In 2016, Aron competed at the World U20 Championships and the 2016 Rio de Janeiro Olympic Games. On 11 July, Aron raced the Leiden Golden Spike 10000m in the Netherlands. He won the race in 27:27.04. On 19 July, Aron placed second in 27:26.20 in the 10000m at the IAAF World U20 Championships in Bydgoszcz, Poland. On 23 July, Aron contested the 5000m at the IAAF World U20 Championships, placing 5th in 13:31.09.

In 2017 Aron placed 5th at the World Cross Country Championships in Kampala, Uganda; the race was won by Kenya's Geoffrey Kamworor. Aron competed in both the 10000m and 5000m at the 2017 London World Championships in Athletics. In the 10000m, Aron placed 11th in 27:09.92. The race was won by Great Britain's Mo Farah, who ran 26:49.51. On 12 August Aron raced the 5000m placing 7th in 13:36.91, Ethiopia's Muktar Edris won the race.

=== 2018-2020 ===
On 10 February 2018, Aron won the Eritrean Half Marathon Championships in Massawa, Eritrea in a time of 1:01:08. Aron represented Eritrea at the IAAF World Half Marathon Championships in Valencia, Spain, placing 3rd in 1:00:31. Kenya's Geoffrey Kamworor won the race in 1:00:02 and Bahrain's Abraham Cheroben placed 2nd in 1:00:22. On 21 October Aron placed 4th at the New Delhi Half Marathon in 59:51.

On 20 March 2019, Aron raced the World Cross Country Championships in Aarhus, Denmark. Aron ran in the lead pack for much of the race finishing behind Joshua Cheptegei, Jacob Kiplimo, and Geoffrey Kamworor, respectively. On 27 August Aron raced at the African Games in Rabat, where he finished 2nd in the 10000m in 27:57.79. The first finisher was Ethiopia's Berehanu Tsegu; however, Berehanu tested positive for EPO and was disqualified. On 6 October Aron raced the 10000m at the 2019 World Championships in Athletics in Doha, Qatar, placing 14th in 28:16.74; the race was won by Uganda's Joshua Cheptegei. Aron then raced the Valencia Half Marathon on 27 October placing 5th in 1:00:25.

On 12 January 2020 Aron raced the 77th Cross Internacional Juan Muguerza in Elgiobar, Spain. Aron finished in 3rd position as the race was won by 17-year-old Ethiopia's Tadese Worku. Aron Kifle was beaten by Kenya's Richard Yator in the final 200 metres to finish 3rd.

=== 2021 ===
On 21 March 2021, Aron won both the 5000m and 10000m at the ENAF Time Trial in Asmara, Eritrea in 14:12.59 and 29:17.14, respectively. On 8 June, Aron raced at the Ethiopian Trials in Hengelo, Netherlands, placing 13th in 28:00.55; the race was won by Ethiopia's Selemon Barega. Aron represented Eritrea at the 2020 Tokyo Olympic Games in the men's 10000m, where he placed 12th in 28:04.06. On 18 September in Asmara, Aron won the 5000m at the Eritrean championships in 14:11.57. On 17 October, Aron raced at the Barcelona Half Marathon, where he placed 4th in 1:00:53. Next, Aron competed in cross country in Spain; on 14 November, Aron won the Cross de Atapuerca. The next weekend on 21 November, Aron placed 4th at the Cross de Italica, while Rodrigue Kwizera who was second at Cross de Atapuerca won.

== International competitions ==
Year	Competition	Venue	Position	Event	Notes
Representing Eritrea
2015	World Championships	Beijing, China	11th (h)	5000 m	13:25.85
2015	African Games	Brazzaville, Republic of the Congo	8th	5000 m	13:26.85
2016	World U20 Championships	Bydgoszcz, Poland	5th	5000 m	13:31.09
2016	World U20 Championships	Bydgoszcz, Poland	2nd	10,000 m	27:26.20
2016	Olympic Games	Rio de Janeiro, Brazil	22nd (h)	5000 m	13:29.45
2017	World Championships	London, United Kingdom	7th	5000 m	13:36.91
2017	World Championships	London, United Kingdom	11th	10,000 m	27:09.92
2018	World Half Marathon Championships	Valencia, Spain	3rd	Half marathon	1:00:31
2019	African Games	Rabat, Morocco	2nd	10,000 m	27:57.79
2019	World Championships	Doha, Qatar	15th	10,000 m	28:16.74
2021	Olympic Games	Tokyo, Japan	12th	10,000 m	28:04.06
2024	Olympic Games	Paris, France	36th (h)	5000 m	14:16.77

== Personal bests ==
Outdoor

- 5000 metres – 13:07.59 (Lausanne 2018)
- 10,000 metres – 27:09.92 (London 2017)
- Half marathon – 59:51 (New Delhi 2018)
