= 2018 IAAF World U20 Championships – Men's 10,000 metres =

Men's 10,000 metres at the 2018 World U20 Championships
- Venue: Ratina Stadium
- Dates: 10 July
- Competitors: 28 from 21 nations
- Winning time: 27:21.08

Medalists
gold medal	Rhonex Kipruto	Kenya
silver medal	Jacob Kiplimo	Uganda
bronze medal	Berihu Aregawi	Ethiopia

The men's 10,000 metres at the 2018 IAAF World U20 Championships was held at Ratina Stadium on 10 July.

== Records ==
Standing records prior to the 2018 IAAF World U20 Championships in Athletics
World Junior Record	Samuel Kamau Wanjiru (KEN)	26:41.75	Paris, France	26 August 2005
Championship Record	Rodgers Chumo Kwemoi (KEN)	27:25.23	Bydgoszcz, Poland	19 July 2016
World Junior Leading	Jacob Kiplimo (UGA)	27:30.25	Gold Coast, Queensland, Australia	13 April 2018

== Results ==
Rank	Name	Nationality	Time	Note
1st place, gold medalist(s)	Rhonex Kipruto	Kenya	27:21.08	CR
2nd place, silver medalist(s)	Jacob Kiplimo	Uganda	27:40.36	
3rd place, bronze medalist(s)	Berihu Aregawi	Ethiopia	27:48.41	PB
4	Solomon Kiplimo Boit	Kenya	27:57.44	PB
5	Olika Adugna	Ethiopia	28:39.67	PB
6	Victor Kiplangat	Uganda	28:42.77	PB
7	Kokob Ghebru	Eritrea	28:59.31	
8	Robel Sibhatu	Eritrea	29:44.59	
9	Takuro Miura	Japan	30:12.25	
10	Saber Abed	Algeria	30:14.82	PB
11	Eshetu Worku	Israel	30:28.25	PB
12	Kartik Kumar	India	30:30.28	
13	István Palkovits	Hungary	30:35.87	PB
14	Walter Martín	Colombia	30:46.37	
15	Eduardo Menacho	Spain	30:52.26	
16	Ali Hissein Mahamat	Chad	30:55.29	
17	Mohamed Kadi Bouchakour	Algeria	30:59.67	
18	Joshua Torley	Australia	31:09.94	SB
19	Marios Anagnostou	Greece	31:15.43	
20	Minho Park	South Korea	31:17.80	
21	Miguel Soria	Peru	31:20.34	
22	Max Turek	Canada	31:30.07	
23	Bruno Rodriquez	Uruguay	31:31.01	
24	Christopher Dryden	New Zealand	31:36.03	
25	Will Merritt	United States	31:58.71	
26	Jungwoo Park	South Korea	32:02.26	
27	Alexandre Figueiredo	Portugal	32:38.02	
28	Matías Rodriguez	Uruguay	33:06.36	
