= Stephen Kissa =

Ugandan long-distance runner

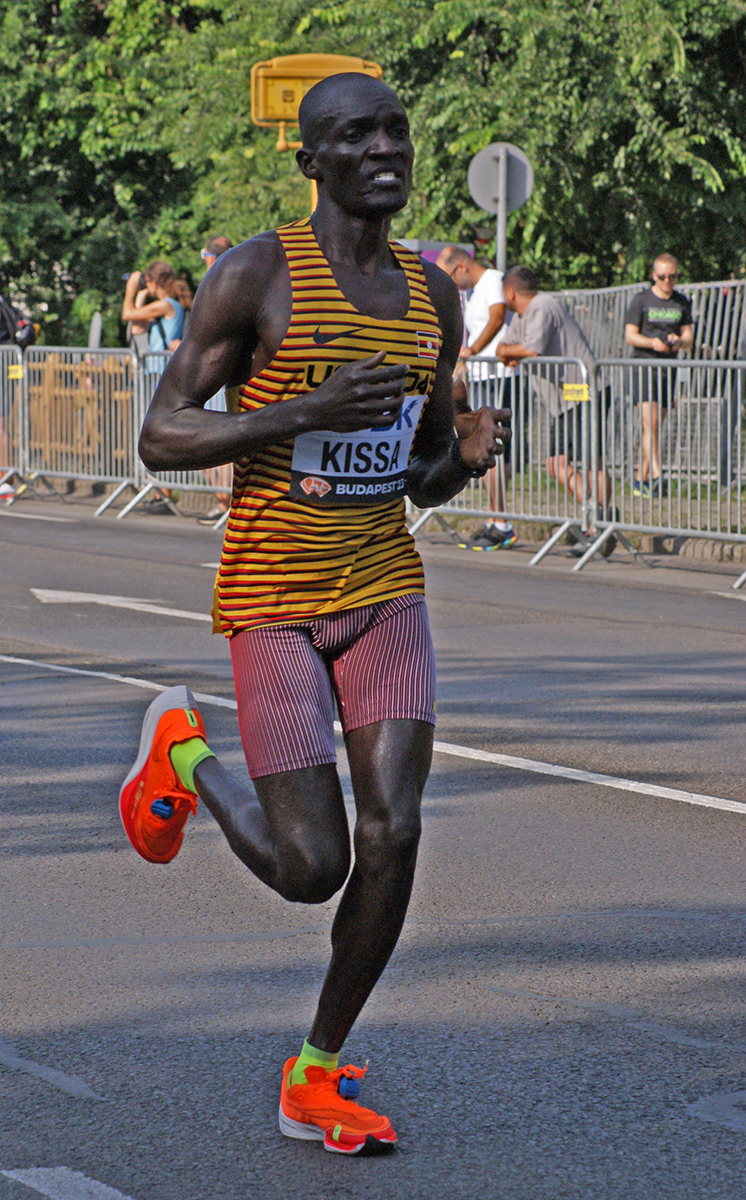
- Kissa at the 2023 World Athletics Championships

Personal information
- Born: 1 December 1995 (age 30)

Sport
- Country: Uganda
- Sport: Long-distance running
- Events: 5000 m, 10,000 m, Half marathon
- Team: NN Running Team

Achievements and titles
- Personal bests: 5000 m: 13:10.93 (Lausanne 2018); 10,000 m: 27:26.46 (Hengelo 2021); Road; 10 km: 27:13 (Laredo 2019); 15 km: 41:49 (Nijmegen 2019); Half marathon: 58:56 (New Delhi 2020); Marathon: 2:04:48 (Hamburg 2022)

Stephen Kissa (born 1 December 1995) is a Ugandan long-distance runner who specializes in the 5000 metres.

He finished 52nd at the 2017 World Cross Country Championships and competed at the 2017 World Championships 5000 metres without reaching the final. The next year he finished 8th in the 5000 metres at the 2018 African Championships.

His personal best time is 13:10.93 minutes, achieved in July 2018 at Athletissima in Lausanne. He has 7:54.32 minutes in the 3000 metres, achieved in July 2018 in Rabat. He won his last race of 2018 at the 15 kilometres road race Montferland Run in the Netherlands.

He competed in the 10,000 metres at the 2020 Summer Olympics. In the race, he created a huge lead ahead of the pack early on and later dropped out with nine laps remaining. Kissa later explained that he was attempting to create a fast-paced race in hopes of helping teammates Joshua Cheptegei and Jacob Kiplimo.
