= 2016 IAAF World U20 Championships – Men's 10,000 metres =

The men's 10,000 metres event at the 2016 IAAF World U20 Championships was held at Zdzisław Krzyszkowiak Stadium on 19 July.

== Medalists ==
Gold	Rodgers Chumo Kwemoi; Kenya
Silver	Aron Kifle; Eritrea
Bronze	Jacob Kiplimo; Uganda

== Records ==
Standing records prior to the 2016 IAAF World U20 Championships in Athletics
World Junior Record	Samuel Kamau Wanjiru (KEN)	26:41.75	Paris, France	26 August 2005
Championship Record	Josphat Bett Kipkoech (KEN)	27:30.85	Bydgoszcz, Poland	9 July 2008
World Junior Leading	Abadi Hadis (ETH)	26:57.88	Hengelo, Netherlands	29 June 2016

== Results ==
Rank	Name	Nationality	Time	Note
1st place, gold medalist(s)	Rodgers Chumo Kwemoi	Kenya	27:25.23	CR
2nd place, silver medalist(s)	Aron Kifle	Eritrea	27:26.20	NU20R
3rd place, bronze medalist(s)	Jacob Kiplimo	Uganda	27:26.68	PB
4	Amedework Walelegn	Ethiopia	28:00.14	PB
5	Gizachew Hailu	Ethiopia	28:09.57	PB
6	Ronald Kiprotich Kirui	Kenya	28:13.43	PB
7	Mogos Shumay	Eritrea	28:23.76	
8	Martin Musau	Uganda	28:34.33	
9	Hayato Seki	Japan	28:57.76	
10	Pietro Riva	Italy	29:25.09	PB
11	Jean-Marie Myasiro	Rwanda	29:26.16	NU20R
12	Kabelo Melamu	South Africa	29:36.29	
13	Shota Onizuka	Japan	29:36.97	
14	Mario Pacay	Guatemala	29:51.66	
15	Abderrazak Charik	France	29:51.75	PB
16	Thomas Pollard	United States	29:53.84	
17	Ehab El-Sandali	Canada	30:15.74	
18	Ali Djoudar	Algeria	30:18.16	
19	Gavit Murli	India	30:20.59	PB
20	Colin Burke	United States	30:20.80	PB
21	Dorin Andrei Rusu	Romania	30:22.17	PB
22	Abhishek Pal	India	30:22.86	PB
23	Sergio Ráez Villanueva	Canada	30:36.00	
24	Yuri Labra	Peru	30:37.63	PB
25	Tawfiq Bouziane	Algeria	30:39.27	
26	Gudadew Belachaw	Israel	30:41.38	PB
27	Sammy Abduljaber	Israel	30:43.01	PB
28	Filipe Fialho	Portugal	30:49.24	PB
29	Ivo Maseda	Spain	30:53.96	PB
30	Ramazan Karagöz	Turkey	31:04.23	
31	Pedro García	Spain	31:18.40	
32	Hugo Catrileo	Chile	31:50.52	
33	Mateusz Kaczor	Poland	32:29.22	
	Joakim Sødal	Norway	DNF	
