= 2016 IAAF World U20 Championships – Men's 5000 metres =

The men's 5000 metres event at the 2016 IAAF World U20 Championships was held at Zdzisław Krzyszkowiak Stadium on 23 July.

== Medalists ==
Gold	Selemon Barega; Ethiopia
Silver	Jamal Abdi Dirieh; Djibouti
Bronze	Wesley Ladema; Kenya

== Records ==
Standing records prior to the 2016 IAAF World U20 Championships in Athletics
World Junior Record	Hagos Gebrhiwet (ETH)	12:47.53	Paris, France	6 July 2012
Championship Record	Abreham Cherkos (ETH)	13:08.57	Bydgoszcz, Poland	13 July 2008
World Junior Leading	Abadi Hadis (ETH)	13:02.49	Shanghai, China	14 May 2016

== Results ==
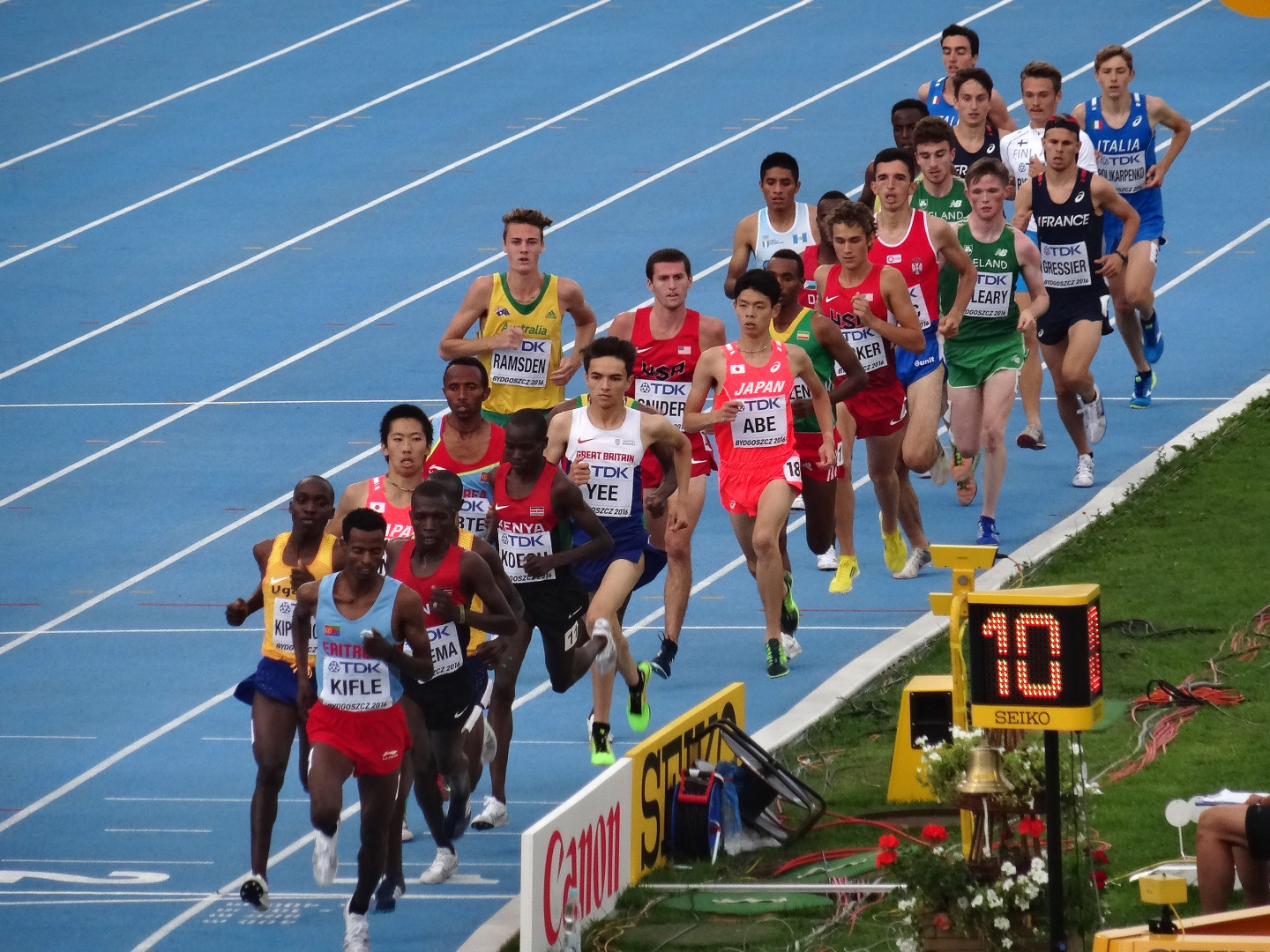
The race underway

Rank	Name	Nationality	Time	Note
1st place, gold medalist(s)	Selemon Barega	Ethiopia	13:21.21	PB
2nd place, silver medalist(s)	Jamal Abdi Dirieh	Djibouti	13:21.50	NU20R
3rd place, bronze medalist(s)	Wesley Ladema	Kenya	13:23.34	PB
4	Yeneblo Biyazen	Ethiopia	13:28.41	PB
5	Aron Kifle	Eritrea	13:31.09	
6	Moses Koech	Kenya	13:35.10	SB
7	Awit Habte	Eritrea	13:50.60	
8	Elzan Bibić	Serbia	13:51.40	NU20R
9	Alexander Yee	Great Britain	13:52.01	PB
10	Jimmy Gressier	France	13:55.07	PB
11	Mario Pacay	Guatemala	13:55.90	NU20R
12	Martin Musau	Uganda	13:58.30	PB
13	Hyuga Endo	Japan	14:08.38	
14	Suldan Hassan	Sweden	14:15.22	
15	Matthew Ramsden	Australia	14:15.35	
16	Zachary Snider	United States	14:15.89	
17	Sergiy Polikarpenko	Italy	14:20.39	PB
18	Victor Kiplangat	Uganda	14:21.22	
19	Olin Hacker	United States	14:23.33	PB
20	Hiroki Abe	Japan	14:27.70	
21	Fabien Palcau	France	14:36.83	
22	Pierre Murchan	Ireland	14:38.67	
23	Robin Ryynänen	Finland	14:46.28	PB
24	Dario De Caro	Italy	14:48.82	
25	Jack O'Leary	Ireland	14:50.67	PB
	Thiery Ndikumwenayo	Burundi	DNS	
