= Athletics at the 2024 Summer Olympics – Men's 10,000 metres =

Men's 10,000 metres at the Games of the XXXIII Olympiad
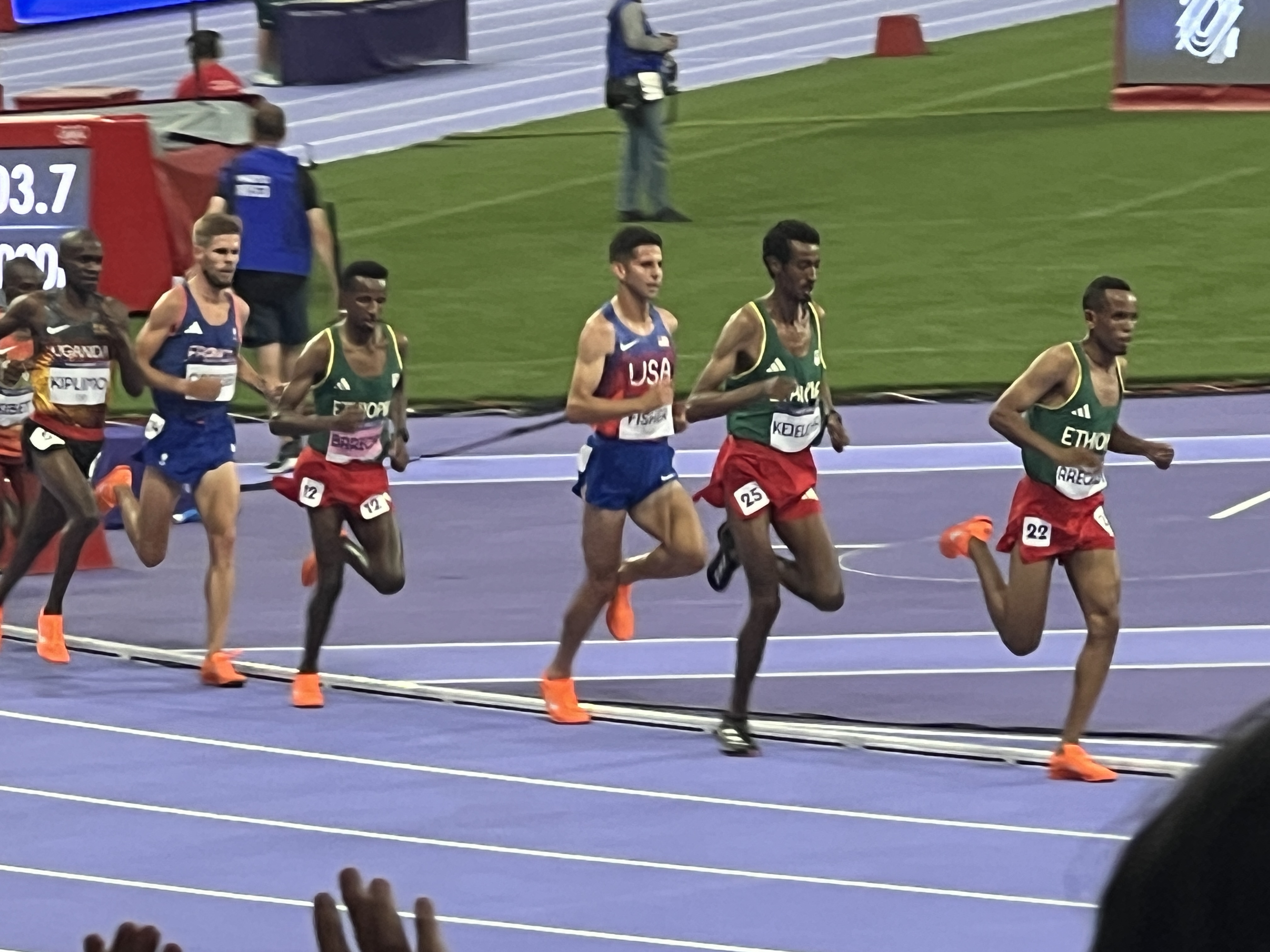
- The final of the men's 10,000 meters at the Paris 2024 Olympics.
- Venue: Stade de France, Paris, France
- Date: 2 August 2024
- Competitors: 27 from 15 nations
- Winning time: 26:43.14 OR

Medalists
1st place, gold medalist(s)		Joshua Cheptegei	Uganda
2nd place, silver medalist(s)		Berihu Aregawi	Ethiopia
3rd place, bronze medalist(s)		Grant Fisher	United States

The men's 10,000 metres at the 2024 Summer Olympics was held at the Stade de France in Paris, France, on 2 August 2024. This was the 26th time in which the men's 10,000 metres has been contested at the Summer Olympics. A total of 27 athletes were able to qualify for the event by entry standard or ranking. Unlike other Olympic events, this event did not have heats or semifinals, with all qualified athletes instead competing in a single final.

== Summary ==
Through the season 20 athletes ran sub 27 minutes, but all of these occurred in just three races, two were used as the Olympic Trials for Ethiopia and Kenya; the third was The TEN, a set up evening race that qualified the eventual American team and individuals from four other countries. World record holder Joshua Cheptegei and several other likely contenders had never attempted the distance during the season. With no qualifying round, they were unknown commodities.

25 athletes started 25 laps around the stadium. After the first few laps all three Ethiopian runners, defending champion Selemon Barega, Yomif Kejelcha and Berihu Aregawi congealed to the front of the large pack. It was clear they intended to control the race from the front, switching position and clearly communicating. Immediately behind them Grant Fisher, Benard Kibet and Mohammed Ahmed positioned themselves to watch the proceedings, but with the games being played at the front of the pack, very few athletes were falling off the back. After 6000 metres, Kejelcha expanded his turn to lead into a 5m gap on his teammates. Seeing the change, Ahmed and Kibet rushed to fill the gap. At that same moment, Fisher caught the heel of a slowing Aregawi, stepping on the curb and nearly falling. With three laps to go, Aregawi and Kejelcha went to the front, looking to set up a wall, but there were 10 athletes bunched up behind. After hovering toward the back of the pack throughout the race, Cheptegei moved up to the front. With 600 to go, Cheptegei ran around the wall, trading elbows with Kejelcha and into the lead. Taking a lesson from Mo Farah, he did not intend to relinquish that lead. The chase was on behind him. Ahmed was the first to get around, followed by Kibet and Fisher. Coming onto the home stretch, Cheptegei had a 3-metre lead on Ahmed. Fisher got around Kibet and everybody sprinted to the finish. Fisher slowly gained and passed Ahmed, clear for silver. But after falling back to 7th place in the re-shuffling, Aregawi sprinted around the outside to roar past everyone but Cheptegei to steal the silver from Fisher by 2 hundredths of a second.

Cheptegei's winning time took 18 seconds off the Olympic record, but the first 13 places all beat the old record because the Ethiopians kept the pace serious from the beginning in far contrast to the usual, slow strategic races in Championship finals. Thierry Ndikumwenayo, Adriaan Wildschutt and Jimmy Gressier set new national records for Spain, South Africa and France respectively.

== Background ==
The men's 10,000 m has been present on the Olympic athletics programme since 1912.

Global records before the 2024 Summer Olympics
Record	Athlete (nation)	Time (s)	Location	Date
World record	Joshua Cheptegei (UGA)	26:11.00	Valencia, Spain	7 October 2020
Olympic record	Kenenisa Bekele (ETH)	27:01.17	Beijing, China	17 August 2008
World leading	Yomif Kejelcha (ETH)	26:31.01	Nerja, Spain	14 June 2024

Area records before the 2024 Summer Olympics
Area record	Athlete (nation)	Time (s)
Africa (records)	Joshua Cheptegei (UGA)	26:11.00 WR
Asia (records)	Ahmad Hassan Abdullah (QAT)	26:38.76
Europe (records)	Mo Farah (GBR)	26:46.57
North, Central America and Caribbean (records)	Grant Fisher (USA)	26:33.84
Oceania (records)	Jack Rayner (AUS)	27:09.57
South America (records)	Marílson dos Santos (BRA)	27:28.12

== Qualification ==
For the men's 10,000 metres event, the qualification period was between 1 July 2023 and 30 June 2024. 27 athletes were able to qualify for the event, with a maximum of three athletes per nation, by running the entry standard of 27:00.00 seconds or faster, or by their World Athletics Ranking for either this event or the Cross Country event.

== Results ==
=== Final ===
The final was held on 2 August, starting at 21:20 (UTC+2) in the evening.

Rank	Athlete	Nation	Result	Notes
1st place, gold medalist(s)	Joshua Cheptegei	Uganda	26:43.14	OR
2nd place, silver medalist(s)	Berihu Aregawi	Ethiopia	26:43.44	
3rd place, bronze medalist(s)	Grant Fisher	United States	26:43.46	SB
4	Mohammed Ahmed	Canada	26:43.79	SB
5	Yomif Kejelcha	Ethiopia	26:44.02	
6	Selemon Barega	Ethiopia	26:44.48	
7	Jacob Kiplimo	Uganda	26:46.39	SB
8	Thierry Ndikumwenayo	Spain	26:49.49	NR
9	Adriaan Wildschutt	South Africa	26:50.64	NR
10	Daniel Mateiko	Kenya	26:50.83	
11	Nico Young	United States	26:58.11	
12	Jimmy Gressier	France	26:58.67	NR
13	Nicholas Kipkorir	Kenya	27:23.97	
14	Merhawi Mebrahtu	Eritrea	27:24.25	
15	William Kincaid	United States	27:29.40	
16	Birhanu Balew	Bahrain	27:30.94	SB
17	Jamal Abdelmaji Eisa Mohammed	Refugee Olympic Team	27:35.92	PB
18	Isaac Kimeli	Belgium	27:51.52	
19	Jun Kasai	Japan	27:53.18	
20	Yves Nimubona	Rwanda	27:54.12	
21	Martin Magengo Kiprotich	Uganda	28:20.72	
22	Abdessamad Oukhelfen	Spain	28:21.90	
23	Tomoki Ota	Japan	29:12.48	
	Yann Schrub	France	DNF	
	Benard Kibet	Kenya	~~26:43.98~~	DSQ
	Rodrigue Kwizera	Burundi	DNS	
	Célestin Ndikumana	Burundi	DNS	
