= 2022 World Athletics Championships – Men's 10,000 metres =

Men's 10,000 metres at the 2022 World Championships
- Venue: Hayward Field
- Dates: 17 July (final)
- Competitors: 27 from 15 nations
- Winning time: 27:27.43

Medalists
gold medal	Joshua Cheptegei	Uganda
silver medal	Stanley Mburu	Kenya
bronze medal	Jacob Kiplimo	Uganda

The men's 10,000 metres at the 2022 World Athletics Championships was held at the Hayward Field in Eugene on 17 July 2022.

== Summary ==
After sorting themselves through the break, Carlos Mayo took over the point, followed by world record holder Joshua Cheptegei and the full American contingent of Grant Fisher, Joe Klecker and Sean McGorty. Near the back of the pack Stanley Mburu fell to the track, getting quickly to his feet and returning to the pack with a noticeable welt developing on his right knee. For the next 8 laps, Mayo led them through a steady diet of 66 second laps. On the third lap, Mburu was tripped again but kept upright. Next to take over leading duties was Cheptegei's Ugandan teammate Stephen Kissa. This move got the attention of Olympic Champion Selemon Barega who moved into the top group. The two Ugandan's shared duties until just before the half way point when Barega moved to the front. This brought the third Ugandan Jacob Kiplimo to take over. Kiplimo opened up a few meters gap with a 64, only covered by Barega, but that was short lived as the next two laps were only 65. The entire field was a single pack until about halfway, now a single file line as a few began to fall off the back, soon including early leader Kissa. With 8 to go, Cheptegei again moved forward, marked by Barega while 15 remained in the pack behind them. At the head of the pack Cheptegei actually slowed the pace to 68 seconds for a couple of laps before dropping it to 65 seconds with 3 to go and 63 seconds with 2 to go. Four athletes lost contact with the pack. On the penultimate lap, Berihu Aregawi ran a 60.3 to move up to the lead before the bell with Mburu splitting Cheptegei and Barega. 8 were still in contention at the bell. Cheptegei took back the lead on the turn, down the backstretch Barega moved up onto his outside shoulder. Cheptegei perceived the threat and opened up a metre gap through the final turn. On the final sprint for home, Cheptegei opened up more space. 40 metres out, Mburu passed Barega. A couple of steps later, Kiplimo went by. And ten meters before the finish, Fisher passed Barega in full sprint, but couldn't catch Kiplimo for bronze.

== Records ==
Before the competition records were as follows:

Record	Athlete & Nat.	Perf.	Location	Date
World record	Joshua Cheptegei (UGA)	26:11.00	Valencia, Spain	7 October 2020
Championship record	Kenenisa Bekele (ETH)	26:46.31	Berlin, Germany	17 August 2009
World Leading	Grant Fisher (USA)	26:33.84	San Juan Capistrano, United States	6 March 2022
African Record	Joshua Cheptegei (UGA)	26:11.00	Valencia, Spain	7 October 2020
Asian Record	Ahmad Hassan Abdullah (QAT)	26:38.76	Brussels, Belgium	5 September 2003
North, Central American and Caribbean record	Grant Fisher (USA)	26:33.84	San Juan Capistrano, United States	6 March 2022
South American Record	Marilson Gomes dos Santos (BRA)	27:28.12	Neerpelt, Belgium	2 June 2007
European Record	Mo Farah (GBR)	26:46.57	Eugene, United States	3 June 2011
Oceanian record	Jack Rayner (AUS)	27:15.35	San Juan Capistrano, United States	6 March 2022

== Qualification standard ==
The standard to qualify automatically for entry was 27:28.00.

== Schedule ==
The event schedule, in local time (UTC−7), was as follows:

Date	Time	Round
17 July	13:00	Final

== Results ==
Rank	Name	Nationality	Time	Notes
1st place, gold medalist(s)	Joshua Cheptegei	Uganda	27:27.43	SB
2nd place, silver medalist(s)	Stanley Mburu	Kenya	27:27.90	SB
3rd place, bronze medalist(s)	Jacob Kiplimo	Uganda	27:27.97	SB
4	Grant Fisher	United States	27:28.14	
5	Selemon Barega	Ethiopia	27:28.39	
6	Mohamed Ahmed	Canada	27:30.27	
7	Berihu Aregawi	Ethiopia	27:31.00	
8	Daniel Mateiko	Kenya	27:33.57	SB
9	Joe Klecker	United States	27:38.73	SB
10	Isaac Kimeli	Belgium	27:43.50	SB
11	Jimmy Gressier	France	27:44.55	
12	Sean McGorty	United States	27:46.30	
13	Carlos Mayo	Spain	27:50.61	
14	Tadese Worku	Ethiopia	27:51.25	
15	Rodgers Kwemoi	Kenya	27:52.26	
16	Rodrigue Kwizera	Burundi	28:01.49	
17	Habtom Samuel	Eritrea	28:01.81	
18	Egide Ntakarutimana	Burundi	28:24.07	
19	Jack Rayner	Australia	28:24.12	
20	Ren Tazawa	Japan	28:24.25	
21	Zouhair Talbi	Morocco	28:28.69	
22	Tatsuhiko Ito	Japan	28:57.85	
23	Patrick Dever	Great Britain & N.I.	29:13.88	
24	Stephen Kissa	Uganda	29:21.10	SB
