= 2023 World Athletics Cross Country Championships – Senior men's race =

Senior men's race at the 2023 World Athletics Cross Country Championships
- Organisers: World Athletics
- Edition: 44th
- Date: February 18, 2023
- Host city: Bathurst, New South Wales, Australia
- Events: 1
- Distances: 10 km – Senior men
- Participation: 122 athletes from 42 nations

The Senior men's race at the 2023 World Athletics Cross Country Championships was held at Bathurst, Australia, on February 18, 2023. Jacob Kiplimo from Uganda won the gold medal by 9 seconds over Ethiopian Berihu Aregawi, while Joshua Cheptegei finished third.

== Race results ==
=== Senior men's race (10 km) ===
==== Individual ====
| Rank | Athlete | Country | Time |
|---|---|---|---|
| 1st place, gold medalist(s) | Jacob Kiplimo | Uganda | 29:17 |
| 2nd place, silver medalist(s) | Berihu Aregawi | Ethiopia | 29:26 |
| 3rd place, bronze medalist(s) | Joshua Cheptegei | Uganda | 29:37 |
| 4 | Geoffrey Kamworor | Kenya | 29:37 |
| 5 | Kibiwott Kandie | Kenya | 29:57 |
| 6 | Daniel Ebanyo | Kenya | 30:01 |
| 7 | Sabastian Sawe | Kenya | 30:04 |
| 8 | Rodrigue Kwizera | Burundi | 30:06 |
| 9 | Hailemariyam Amare | Ethiopia | 30:10 |
| 10 | Mogos Tuemay | Ethiopia | 30:11 |
| 11 | Chimdessa Debele | Ethiopia | 30:13 |
| 12 | Selemon Barega | Ethiopia | 30:16 |
| 13 | Nicholas Kipkorir | Kenya | 30:32 |
| 14 | Getaneh Molla | Ethiopia | 30:39 |
| 15 | Rogers Kibet | Uganda | 30:40 |
| 16 | Precious Lesiba Mashele | South Africa | 30:44 |
| 17 | Habtom Samuel | Eritrea | 30:53 |
| 18 | Martin Magengo Kiprotich | Uganda | 30:56 |
| 19 | Emmanuel Kiprop Kipruto | Kenya | 30:57 |
| 20 | Célestin Ndikumana | Burundi | 30:57 |
| 21 | Samuel Chelanga | United States | 31:04 |
| 22 | Aarón Las Heras | Spain | 31:08 |
| 23 | Ky Robinson | Australia | 31:11 |
| 24 | Isaac Kibet | Uganda | 31:12 |
| 25 | Samsom Amare | Eritrea | 31:12 |
| 26 | Santiago Catrofe | Uruguay | 31:14 |
| 27 | Maxime Chaumeton | South Africa | 31:18 |
| 28 | Josephat Joshua Gisemo | Tanzania | 31:24 |
| 29 | Jack Rayner | Australia | 31:30 |
| 30 | Samuel Kibet | Uganda | 31:34 |
| 31 | Brett Robinson | Australia | 31:36 |
| 32 | Emmanuel Bor | United States | 31:37 |
| 33 | Andrew Buchanan | Australia | 31:38 |
| 34 | Nasim Hassaous | Spain | 31:40 |
| 35 | Avinash Sable | India | 31:43 |
| 36 | Andrew Colley | United States | 31:44 |
| 37 | Mbuleli Mathanga | South Africa | 31:53 |
| 38 | Elroy Gelant | South Africa | 31:54 |
| 39 | Sergio Paniagua | Spain | 31:56 |
| 40 | Rorey Hunter | Australia | 31:57 |
| 41 | William Amponsah | Ghana | 32:00 |
| 42 | Abdessamad Oukhelfen | Spain | 32:05 |
| 43 | Abraham Habte | Eritrea | 32:08 |
| 44 | John Gay | Canada | 32:09 |
| 45 | Anthony Rotich | United States | 32:11 |
| 46 | Inyasi Nicodemus Sulley | Tanzania | 32:15 |
| 47 | Cameron Avery | New Zealand | 32:17 |
| 48 | Matt Baxter | New Zealand | 32:22 |
| 49 | Blessing Waison | Zimbabwe | 32:23 |
| 50 | Collen Mulaudzi | South Africa | 32:26 |
| 51 | Andre Waring | Australia | 32:27 |
| 52 | Fabiano Nelson Sulle | Tanzania | 32:29 |
| 53 | Max Turek | Canada | 32:30 |
| 54 | Marcelo Laguera | Mexico | 32:35 |
| 55 | Andreu Blanes | Spain | 32:38 |
| 56 | Mathayo Sombi Samhenda | Tanzania | 32:41 |
| 57 | Egide Ntakarutimana | Burundi | 32:42 |
| 58 | Mikkel Dahl-Jessen | Denmark | 32:43 |
| 59 | Mathews Leeto | South Africa | 32:44 |
| 60 | Dillon Maggard | United States | 32:46 |
| 61 | Tim Robertson | New Zealand | 32:52 |
| 62 | Philippe Parrot-Migas | Canada | 33:01 |
| 63 | Arturs Niklavs Medveds | Latvia | 33:05 |
| 64 | Julian Oakley | New Zealand | 33:13 |
| 65 | Reid Buchanan | United States | 33:15 |
| 66 | Ma Wenliang | China | 33:16 |
| 67 | Jacob Simonsen Sommer | Denmark | 33:19 |
| 68 | Andrew Davies | Canada | 33:21 |
| 69 | Zong Qinghua | China | 33:24 |
| 70 | Leonid Latsepov | Estonia | 33:36 |
| 71 | He Yingbing | China | 33:45 |
| 72 | Salem Mohamed Attiaallah | Egypt | 33:47 |
| 73 | Abdi Dawidh Rhoble | Somalia | 33:56 |
| 74 | Keita Yoshida | Japan | 33:57 |
| 75 | Roberto Del Valle | Mexico | 34:01 |
| 76 | Zakariya Mahamed | United Kingdom | 34:05 |
| 77 | Franklin Tellez | Colombia | 34:07 |
| 78 | Ren Guangyue | China | 34:10 |
| 79 | Munit Kabbara | Lebanon | 34:10 |
| 80 | Gonzalo Cruz | Mexico | 34:12 |
| 81 | Hazuma Hattori | Japan | 34:26 |
| 82 | Atia Koogo | Ghana | 34:27 |
| 83 | Luis Alberto Orta | Venezuela | 34:28 |
| 84 | Matthew Taylor | New Zealand | 34:49 |
| 85 | Guo Zhongrui | China | 35:15 |
| 86 | Anand Singh | India | 35:20 |
| 87 | Sohail Amir | Pakistan | 35:40 |
| 88 | Nassim Kabbara | Lebanon | 35:51 |
| 89 | Khalid Al Badwawi | United Arab Emirates | 36:01 |
| 90 | Aleksandr Salahudinov | Kyrgyzstan | 36:10 |
| 91 | Tomoya Kitamura | Japan | 36:10 |
| 92 | Suine Kagl | Papua New Guinea | 36:18 |
| 93 | Wong Wan Chun | Hong Kong | 36:36 |
| 94 | Damien Troquenet | French Polynesia | 36:37 |
| 95 | Gaylord Silly | Seychelles | 36:38 |
| 96 | James Kuadua Gundu | Papua New Guinea | 36:44 |
| 97 | Zayd Al Sayd | Lebanon | 36:44 |
| 98 | Fan Zuozheng | China | 36:52 |
| 99 | Shu Hasegawa | Japan | 37:25 |
| 100 | Abel Siune | Papua New Guinea | 37:48 |
| 101 | Aquila Turalom | Papua New Guinea | 38:09 |
| 102 | Jeevaneesh Soundararajah | Singapore | 38:16 |
| 103 | Martin Faeni | Solomon Islands | 38:17 |
| 104 | Ryan Matienzo | Guam | 38:39 |
| 105 | Israel Takap | Papua New Guinea | 38:51 |
| 106 | Wong Yaohan Melvin | Singapore | 39:22 |
| 107 | Evueli Tola | Fiji | 39:44 |
| 108 | Pramesh Prasad | Fiji | 44:26 |
| 109 | Benjamin Ashkettle | Fiji | 44:27 |
| - | Andrew John Logan | Cook Islands | DNF |
| - | Abrar Osman | Eritrea | DNF |
| - | Jeremiah Singh | Fiji | DNF |
| - | Teiote Betero | Kiribati | DNF |
| - | Bildad Bildad | Marshall Islands | DNF |
| - | Sildrey Job Noceja Veloria | Northern Mariana Islands | DNF |
| - | Oliver Chignell | New Zealand | DNF |
| - | Gregory Foasilafu | Solomon Islands | DNF |
| - | Connor Black | Canada | DNS |
| - | Mitchell Ubene | Canada | DNS |
| - | Mogos Shumay | Eritrea | DNS |
| - | Salifu Seidu | Ghana | DNS |

==== Team ====
| Rank | Team | Score |
|---|---|---|
| 1st place, gold medalist(s) | Kenya | 22 |
| 2nd place, silver medalist(s) | Ethiopia | 32 |
| 3rd place, bronze medalist(s) | Uganda | 37 |
| 4 | Australia | 116 |
| 5 | South Africa | 118 |
| 6 | United States | 134 |
| 7 | Spain | 137 |
| 8 | Tanzania | 182 |
| 9 | New Zealand | 220 |
| 10 | Canada | 227 |
| 11 | China | 284 |
| 12 | Japan | 345 |
| 13 | Papua New Guinea | 389 |
