= Weldon Langat =

Kenyan long-distance runner

Personal information
- Full name: Weldon Kipkirui Langat
- Born: 24 February 1998 (age 28)

Sport
- Sport: Athletics
- Events: 5000 m, 10,000 m

Achievements and titles
- Personal bests: 5000 m: 13:33.86 (Nairobi 2021); 10,000 m: 27:24.73 (Nairobi 2021)

Weldon Kipkirui Langat (born 24 February 1998) is a Kenyan long-distance runner. He competed in the 10,000 metres at the 2020 Summer Olympics, finishing 20th with a time of 28:41.42.
