= 2014 World Junior Championships in Athletics – Men's 10,000 metres =

The men's 10000 metres at the 2014 World Junior Championships in Athletics was held at Hayward Field on 22 July.

== Medalists ==
Gold	Joshua Kiprui Cheptegei; Uganda 28:32.86
Silver	Elvis Kipchoge Cheboi; Kenya 28:35.20
Bronze	Nicholas Mboroto Kosimbei; Kenya 28:38.68

== Records ==
Standing records prior to the 2014 World Junior Championships in Athletics
World Junior Record	Samuel Wanjiru (KEN)	26:41.75	Paris, France	6 July 2012
Championship Record	Josephat Bett Kipkoech (KEN)	27:30.85	Bydgoszcz, Poland	9 July 2008
World Junior Leading	Joshua Kiprui Cheptegei (UGA)	27:56.26	Leiden, Netherlands	14 June 2014
Broken records during the 2014 World Junior Championships in Athletics

== Results ==
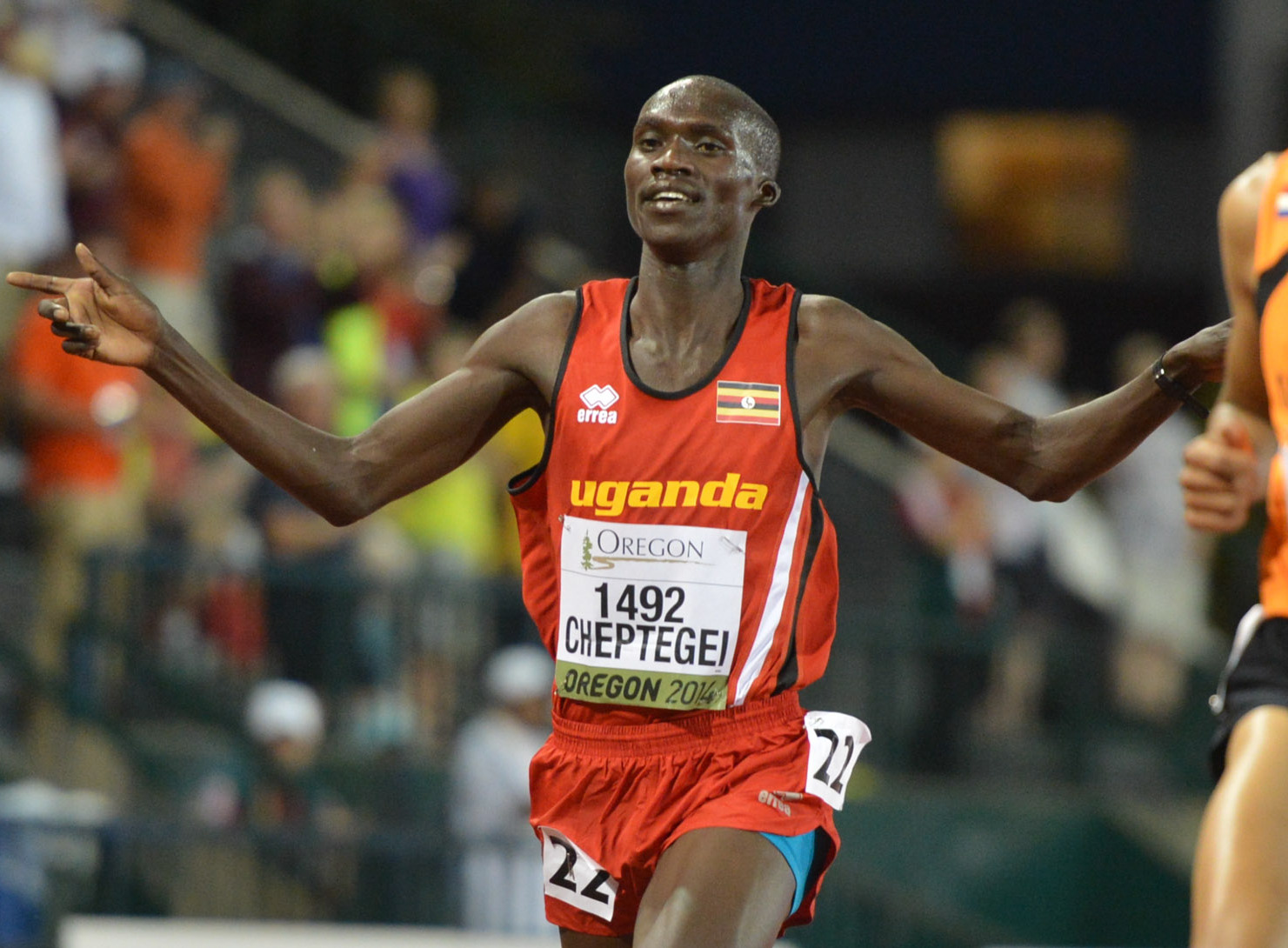
Joshua Cheptegei after winning the competition

Place	Bib #	Athlete	Nationality	Time	Notes
1st place, gold medalist(s)	1492	Joshua Kiprui Cheptegei	Uganda	28:32.86	
2nd place, silver medalist(s)	968	Elvis Kipchoge Cheboi	Kenya	28:35.20	
3rd place, bronze medalist(s)	977	Nicholas Mboroto Kosimbei	Kenya	28:38.68	
4	505	Afewerki Berhane	Eritrea	28:45.83	Pb
5	1494	Abdallah Kibet Mande	Uganda	28:53.77	
6	554	Yihunilign Adane	Ethiopia	28:54.84	
7	937	Keisuke Nakatani	Japan	29:11.40	
8	920	Hazuma Hattori	Japan	29:12.74	
9	478	Robleh Djama Aden	Djibouti	29:43.49	Njr
10	520	Carlos Mayo	Spain	29:52.31	Pb
11	999	Kim Tae-jin	South Korea	29:53.93	Pb
12	1098	Bart van Nunen	Netherlands	29:58.90	
13	783	István Szögi	Hungary	30:15.93	
14	1214	Miguel Marques	Portugal	30:23.50	Pb
15	1558	Brendan Shearn	United States	30:24.30	
16	1390	Andreas Jansson	Sweden	30:38.81	
17	998	Jo Jun-haeng	South Korea	30:43.11	
18	1426	Ho Cheng-hsun	Chinese Taipei	30:48.86	
19	1094	Noah Schutte	Netherlands	31:00.94	
20	522	Santiago Pardo	Spain	31:04.13	
21	850	Giulio Perpetuo	Italy	31:04.48	
22	457	Jakub Zemaník	Czech Republic	31:06.76	
23	757	Márkos Goúrlias	Greece	31:09.95	
24	1536	Jonathan Green	United States	31:15.69	
25	1463	Onur Aras	Turkey	31:25.09	
26	1500	Mykola Nyzhnyk	Ukraine	31:27.03	
27	106	Djamal Mehbali	Algeria	31:29.21	
28	326	Jesse Hooton	Canada	31:38.78	
29	452	Dominik Kubec	Czech Republic	31:47.15	
30	1055	Sandro Enriquez	Mexico	32:08.44	
31	1140	Kristian Tjørnhom	Norway	32:08.79	
32	1163	Jhordan Alonso Ccope	Peru	32:11.42	
33	1162	Daniel Angoma	Peru	32:19.66	
34	842	Omar Guerniche	Italy	32:30.44	
35	1130	Lars Jonassen Føyen	Norway	32:37.73	
	1467	Saffet Elkatmis	Turkey	Dnf	
	108	Ahmed Slimane	Algeria	Dnf	
	300	Abdi Ibrahim Abdo	Brunei	Dnf	
