= Carlos Mayo =

Spanish long-distance runner (born 1995)

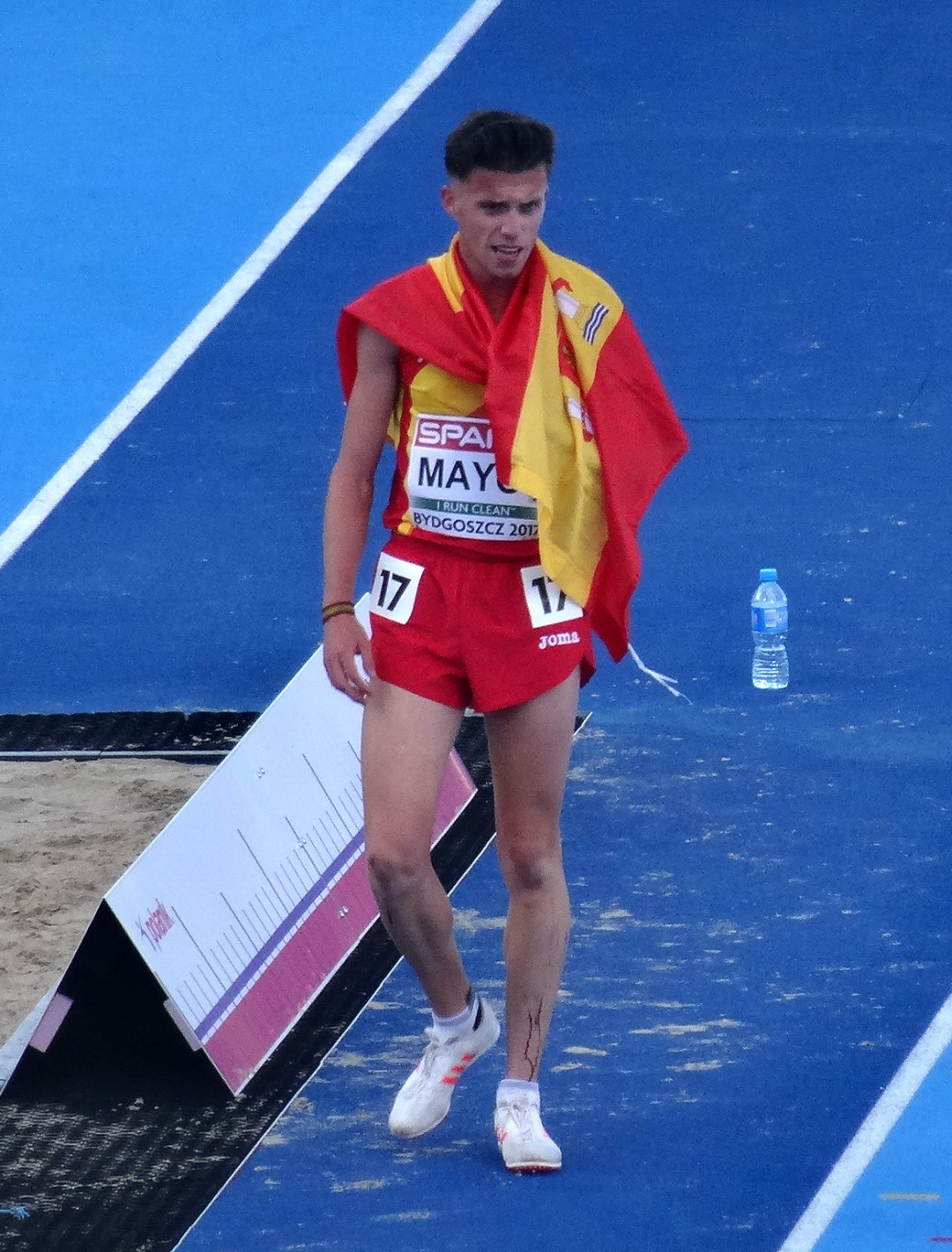
- Mayo in 2017

Personal information
- Full name: Carlos Mayo Nieto
- Born: 18 September 1995 (age 30) Madrid, Spain
- Height: 1.79 m (5 ft 10 in)
- Weight: 65 kg (143 lb)

Sport
- Sport: Athletics
- Events: 5000 m, 10,000 m
- Club: C.A. Adidas
- Coached by: José Luis Mareca

Carlos Mayo Nieto (born 18 September 1995 in Madrid) is a Spanish long-distance runner.

He won three medals in the European Athletics U23 Championships. He won a bronze medal in the 5000 metres at the 2015 European U23 Championships and two years later, a gold medal in the 10000 metres and a bronze medal in the 5000 metres at the 2017 European U23 Championships.

== International competitions ==
Year	Competition	Venue	Position	Event	Notes
Representing Spain
2014	World Junior Championships	Eugene, United States	14th	5000 m	14:19.22
2014	World Junior Championships	Eugene, United States	10th	10000 m	29:52.31
2015	European U23 Championships	Tallinn, Estonia	3rd	5000 m	13:55.19
2016	European Championships	Amsterdam, Netherlands	14th	5000 m	13:58.22
2017	European Indoor Championships	Belgrade, Serbia	8th	3000 m	8:06.15
2017	European 10,000 m Cup	Minsk, Belarus	3rd	10,000 m	28:48.41
2017	European U23 Championships	Bydgoszcz, Poland	3rd	5000 m	14:15.07
2017	European U23 Championships	Bydgoszcz, Poland	1st	10,000 m	29:28.06
2021	Olympic Games	Tokyo, Japan	13th	10,000 m	28:04.71
2022	Ibero-American Championships	La Nucía, Spain	1st	5000 m	13:51.12
2022	World Championships	Eugene, United States	13th	10,000 m	27:50.61
2024	European Championships	Rome, Italy	14th	Half marathon	1:02:12
2025	European Running Championships	Leuven, Belgium	8th	Half marathon	1:02:30
2026	European Championships	Birmingham, United Kingdom	15th	Marathon	2:11:27

== Personal bests ==
Outdoor

- 1500 metres – 3:36.44 (Barcelona 2021)
- 3000 metres – 7:48.29 (Ibiza 2021)
- 5000 metres – 13:18.15 (Chorzow 2021)
- 10000 metres – 27:25.00 (Birmingham 2021)
- Half marathon - 1h00:06 (Valencia 2020)

Indoor

- 1500 metres – 3:49.01 (San Sebastián 2016)
- 3000 metres – 7:45.54 (Barcelona 2021)
