= 2014 World Junior Championships in Athletics – Men's 5000 metres =

Racing Competition That Held In 2014 Us USA

The men's 5000 metres at the 2014 World Junior Championships in Athletics was held at Hayward Field on 25 July.

== Medalists ==
| Gold | Yomif Kejelcha; Ethiopia |
| Silver | Yasin Haji; Ethiopia |
| Bronze | Moses Letoyie; Kenya |

== Records ==
Standing records prior to the 2014 World Junior Championships in Athletics
| World Junior Record | Hagos Gebrhiwet (ETH) | 12:47.53 | Paris, France | 6 July 2012 |
| Championship Record | Abreham Cherkos (ETH) | 13:08.57 | Bydgoszcz, Poland | 13 July 2008 |
| World Junior Leading | Moses Letoyie (KEN) | 13:19.26 | Shanghai, China | 18 May 2014 |
Broken records during the 2014 World Junior Championships in Athletics

== Results ==
=== Final ===
| 1 | Yomif Kejelcha (ETH) | 13:25.19 | PB |
| 2 | Yasin Haji (ETH) | 13:26.21 | PB |
| 3 | Moses Letoyie (KEN) | 13:28.11 | |
| 4 | Joshua Kiprui Cheptegei (UGA) | 13:32.84 | PB |
| 5 | Fredrick Kipkosgei Kiptoo (KEN) | 13:35.39 | |
| 6 | Phillip Kipyeko (UGA) | 13:40.55 | |
| 7 | Tsegay Tuemay (ERI) | 13:50.78 | |
| 8 | Justyn Knight (CAN) | 14:08.93 | PB |
| 9 | Colby Gilbert (USA) | 14:09.98 | |
| 10 | Morgan McDonald (AUS) | 14:10.08 | |
| 11 | Kazuto Kawabata (JPN) | 14:10.14 | |
| 12 | István Szögi (HUN) | 14:11.35 | PB |
| 13 | Brian Barraza (USA) | 14:13.33 | PB |
| 14 | Carlos Mayo (ESP) | 14:19.22 | |
| 15 | Kim Tae-jin (KOR) | 14:33.14 | |
| 16 | Shota Onizuka (JPN) | 14:34.92 | |
| 17 | Mohamed Zarhouni (ESP) | 14:19.22 | |
| 18 | Julien Wanders (SUI) | 14:50.38 | |
| | Yemaneberhan Crippa (ITA) | DNS | |
