= Christophe Tuyishimire =

Rwandan long-distance runner

Personal information
- Born: 14 January 1989 (age 36)

Sport
- Country: Rwanda
- Sport: Long-distance running

Christophe Tuyishimire (born 14 January 1989) is a Rwandan long-distance runner. In 2019, he competed in the senior men's race at the 2019 IAAF World Cross Country Championships held in Aarhus, Denmark. He finished in 84th place.

In 2018, he represented Rwanda at the 2018 Commonwealth Games held in Gold Coast. He competed in the men's 5000 metres event and he finished in 14th place.
