= Mohammed Ahmed (runner) =

Canadian long-distance runner (born 1991)

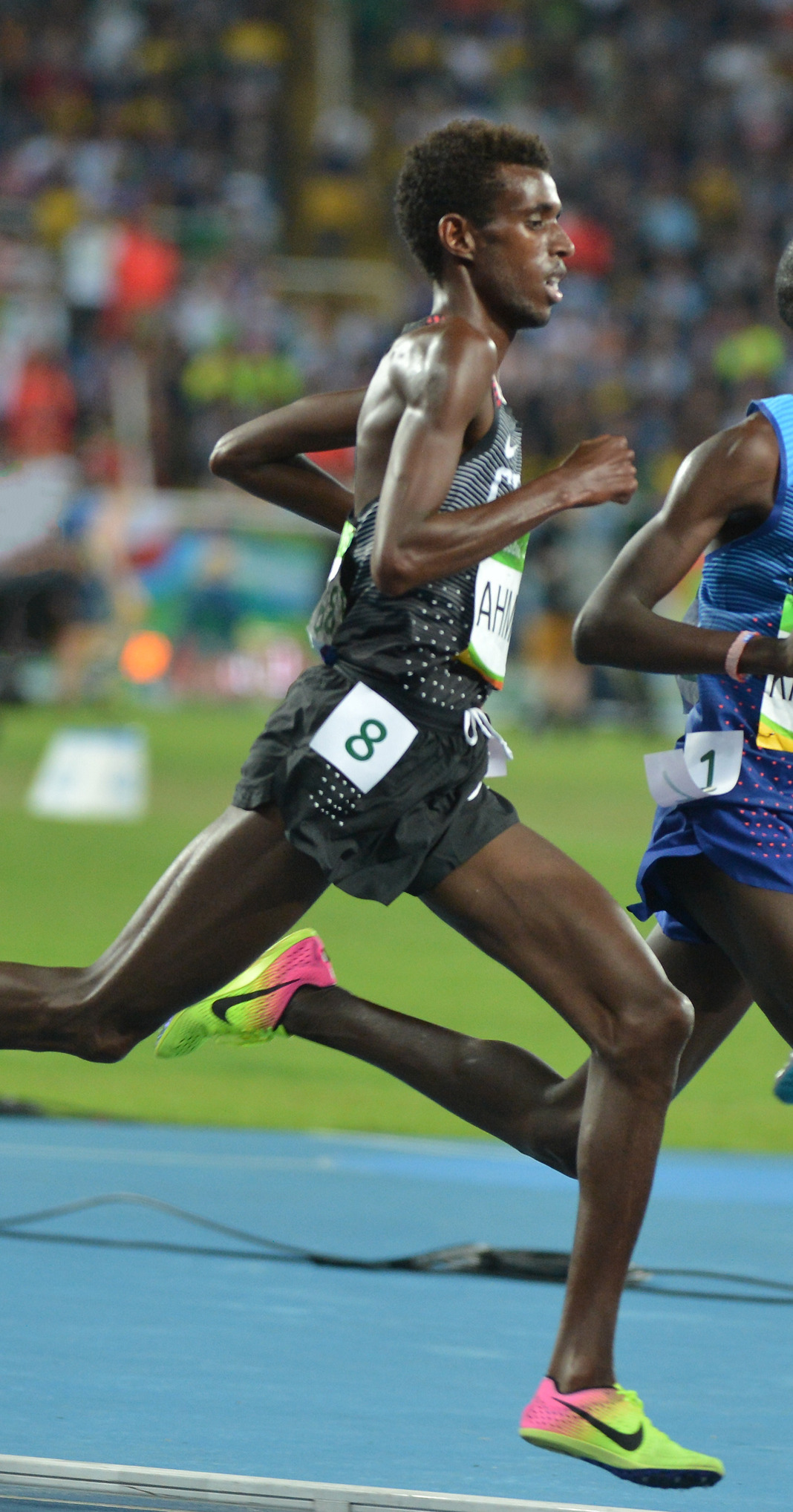
- Ahmed at the 2016 Summer Olympics

Personal information
- Nickname: Mospeed
- Nationality: Canadian
- Born: January 5, 1991 (age 35) Mogadishu, Somalia
- Home town: St. Catharines, Ontario
- Height: 182 cm (6 ft 0 in)
- Weight: 54 kg (119 lb)

Sport
- Country: Canada
- Sport: Track and field
- Event: Long-distance running
- College team: University of Wisconsin–Madison
- Club: Bowerman Track Club
- Coached by: Jerry Schumacher

Achievements and titles
- Personal bests: Outdoor; 1500 m: 3:34.89 (Portland 2020); Mile: 3:53.87 (Eugene 2021); 3000 m: 7:31.96 NR (Chorzów 2024); 2-Mile: 8:15.76 NR (Palo Alto 2019); 5000 m: 12:47.20 AR (Portland 2020); 10,000 m: 26:34.14 NR (San Juan Capistrano 2022); Indoor; 3000 m: 7:40.11 i (New York 2016); 2-Mile: 8:13.16 i NR (New York 2017); 5000 m: 12:56.87 i NR (Boston 2022)
Medal record
Men's athletics
Representing Canada
Olympic Games
Silver medal – second place	2020 Tokyo	5000 m
World Championships
Bronze medal – third place	2019 Doha	5000 m
Commonwealth Games
Silver medal – second place	2018 Gold Coast	5,000 m
Silver medal – second place	2018 Gold Coast	10,000 m
Pan American Games
Gold medal – first place	2015 Toronto	10,000 m
Representing Americas
Continental Cup
	Silver	2018 Ostrava

Mohammed Ahmed (born January 5, 1991) is a Canadian long-distance runner. A four-time Olympian, he is his country's most successful athlete in long-distance racing, being the first to medal in the 5000 metres at both the World Championships (bronze in 2019) and the Olympic Games (silver in 2021).

As well he is a two-time silver medallist at the Commonwealth Games in the 5000m and 10,000m events and was the 2015 Pan American champion in the 10,000 m. He holds the eleventh-fastest 5000m time in history and has set several national and area records.

== Early life ==
Ahmed was born in Mogadishu, Somalia to Said Yusuf and Halimo Farah. Ahmed was raised in the town of El Afweyn in Somaliland, a town mainly inhabited by the Habr Je'lo clan of the Isaaq clan-family. His family moved to Kenya, and Moh spent the first ten years of his life there. His family then moved to St. Catharines, Ontario in Canada when he was 11 years old. He began running track at the age of 13 after watching his brothers run track at school.

== Running career ==
=== Youth ===
Before college, Mohammed Ahmed was the Canadian junior 5000 m champion on four occasions and twice finished in the top ten at World Junior Championships (fourth in 2010, ninth in 2008), to go along with two Canadian senior titles in the event. Ahmed also won a Pan American Junior title.

=== Collegiate ===
Ahmed attended St. Catharines Collegiate before going on to the University of Wisconsin–Madison, from which he graduated in 2014. During his time at college, he amassed eleven NCAA All-American awards in track and cross country and an Olympic berth in the 10,000 m at the 2012 Summer Olympics in London, where he finished in eighteenth place.

At the 2013 World Championships in Moscow, Mohammed clocked the best time over 10,000 m in Canadian history with his ninth-place finish, almost equaling his lifetime best in the process with a 27:35.76 result.

Ahmed was named to Canada's team for the 2014 Commonwealth Games, where he competed in the 5000 and 10,000 m, finishing in fifth and sixth place respectively.

=== Professional ===
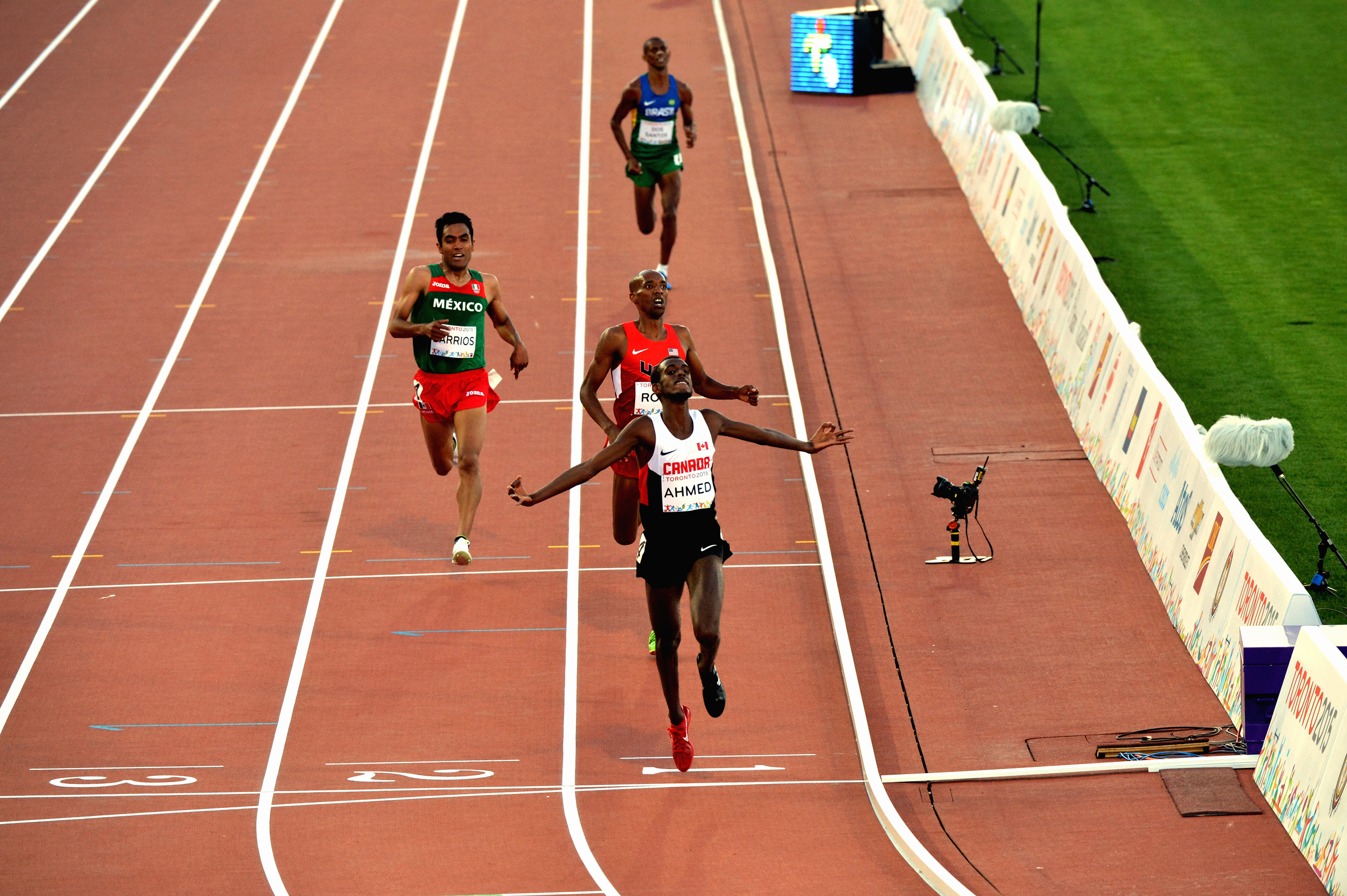
Ahmed winning gold at the 2015 Pan American Games.

Moving to the professional scene after his university career, Ahmed was part of the home team at the 2015 Pan American Games in Toronto. He competed only in the 10,000 m, winning the gold medal. He went on to the 2015 World Championships, competing only in the 5000 m and finishing in twelfth place.

On May 28, 2016, Ahmed set a personal best and Canadian national record in the 5000 m at the Prefontaine Classic, finishing in a time of 13:01.74 Competing as part of his second Canadian Olympic team, Ahmed placed thirty-second in the 10,000 m at the 2016 Summer Olympics in Rio de Janeiro. After this very dispiriting outcome, Ahmed finished in fourth place in the 5000 m with a time of 13:05.94, 1.5 seconds short of the bronze medal. He later said this left him "shedding tears of agony and defeat."

Ahmed ran the eleventh-fastest indoor 5000 m in history in Boston in 2017, setting the Canadian national record in the process. On August 4, 2017, Ahmed set a personal best and Canadian national record in the 10,000 m, placing eighth at the 2017 World Championships in Athletics with a time of 27:02.35 Ahmed was nominated for Sports Person of the Year at the International Somali Awards 2018. He also won two silver medals at the Commonwealth Games that year, in both the 5000 and 10000 m.

Competing at the 2019 World Athletics Championships, Ahmed won the bronze medal in the 5000 m event, the first for a Canadian runner. Ahmed led late in the race, briefly dropping to fifth position in the final stretch before recovering to take third place. He was sixth in the 10,000 m at the same championships.

Despite the COVID-19 pandemic causing the cancellation of much of the 2020 international season and delaying the 2020 Summer Olympics by a year, Ahmed set a personal best and Canadian national record in the men's 5000 m with a time of 12:47.20 while competing at the Portland Intrasquad Meet II in Portland, Oregon on July 10, 2020.

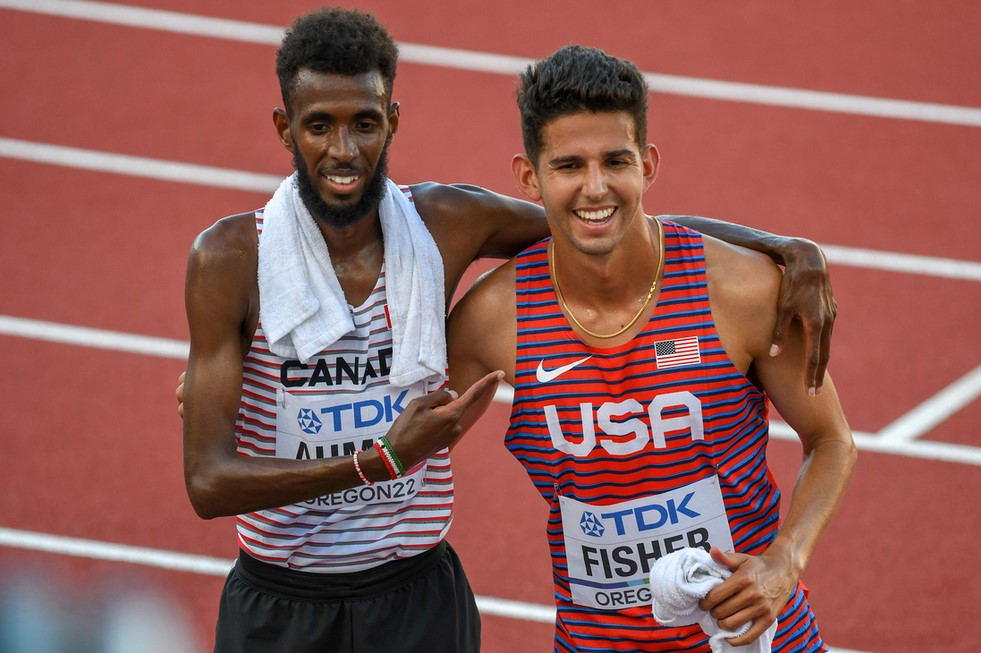
Ahmed (left) at the 2022 World Athletics Championships

Ahmed was named to his third Olympic team in 2021. Competing first off in the 10,000 m event in Tokyo, Ahmed finished sixth after briefly leading late in the race and running a season's best in the process. He next competed in the 5000 m event, where he had finished fourth in Rio five years before. Having already replicated his sixth-place disappointment in the 10,000 m at the prior World Championships, Ahmed had to rally himself mentally for the next race. He entered the final lap in sixth position before surging ahead into second position by the final 100 metres, winning the silver medal. He was the first Canadian to medal at this distance in the Olympics and remarked: "every race that didn’t go to plan has got me here."

Disappointment awaited Ahmed in the 10,000 m at the 2022 World Athletics Championships, where he finished sixth once again. He remarked afterward that "I still haven't figured out the 10K. It's disappointing. I thought I prepared really well." He then finished fifth in the 5000 m, 0.26 seconds behind bronze medalist Oscar Chelimo of Uganda. Ahmed commented on the strength of the field, saying, "only four guys in this field didn't break sub-13. That tells you the depth of this event. I've got to fix some things, but not a bad result; top-five in the world."

At the 2023 World Athletics Championships, Ahmed came sixth in the 10,000 m and then finished seventh in the 5000 m.

After fading over the final meters of the race, Ahmed finished fourth in the 10,000 m at the 2024 Paris Olympics.

== Competition record ==
Representing Canada
Year	Competition	Venue	Position	Event	Notes
2012	Olympic Games	London, United Kingdom	18th	10,000 m	28:13.91
2013	World Championships	Moscow, Russia	9th	10,000 m	27:35.76
2014	Commonwealth Games	Glasgow, United Kingdom	5th	5,000 m	13:18.88
2014	Commonwealth Games	Glasgow, United Kingdom	6th	10,000 m	28:02.96
2015	Pan American Games	Toronto, Canada	1st	10,000 m	28:49.96
2015	World Championships	Beijing, China	12th	5,000 m	14:00.38
2016	Olympic Games	Rio de Janeiro, Brazil	4th	5,000 m	13:05.94
2016	Olympic Games	Rio de Janeiro, Brazil	32nd	10,000 m	29:32.84
2017	World Championships	London, United Kingdom	6th	5,000 m	13:39.15
2017	World Championships	London, United Kingdom	8th	10,000 m	27:02.35
2018	Commonwealth Games	Gold Coast, Australia	2nd	5,000 m	13:52.78
2018	Commonwealth Games	Gold Coast, Australia	2nd	10,000 m	27:20.56
2018	Continental Cup	Ostrava, Czech Republic	2nd	3,000 m	7:57.99
2019	World Championships	Doha, Qatar	3rd	5,000 m	13:01.11
2019	World Championships	Doha, Qatar	6th	10,000 m	26:59.35
2021	Olympic Games	Tokyo, Japan	2nd	5,000 m	12:58.61
2021	Olympic Games	Tokyo, Japan	6th	10,000 m	27:47.76
2022	World Championships	Eugene, United States	5th	5,000 m	13:10.46
2022	World Championships	Eugene, United States	6th	10,000 m	27:30.27
2023	World Championships	Budapest, Hungary	7th	5,000 m	13:12.92
2023	World Championships	Budapest, Hungary	6th	10,000 m	27:56.43
2024	Olympic Games	Paris, France	16th (sf)	5,000 m	14:15.76
2024	Olympic Games	Paris, France	4th	10,000 m	26:44.79
2025	World Championships	Tokyo, Japan	–	10,000 m	DNF
2026	Commonwealth Games	Glasgow, United Kingdom	7th	5000 m	13:26.09
