= Athletics at the 2018 Commonwealth Games – Men's 5000 metres =

Men's 5000 metres at the 2018 Commonwealth Games
- Venue: Carrara Stadium
- Dates: 8 April
- Competitors: 17 from 9 nations
- Winning time: 13:50.83

Medalists
gold medal	Joshua Cheptegei	Uganda
silver medal	Mohammed Ahmed	Canada
bronze medal	Edward Zakayo	Kenya

The men's 5000 metres at the 2018 Commonwealth Games, as part of the athletics programme, took place in the Carrara Stadium on 8 April 2018.

== Records ==
Prior to this competition, the existing world and Games records were as follows:

World record	Kenenisa Bekele (ETH)	12:37.35	Hengelo, Netherlands	31 May 2004
Games record	Augustine Choge (KEN)	12:56.41	Melbourne, Australia	20 March 2006

== Schedule ==
The schedule was as follows:

Date	Time	Round
Sunday 8 April 2018	16:40	Final

All times are Australian Eastern Standard Time (UTC+10)

== Results ==
With seventeen entrants, the event was held as a straight final.

=== Final ===
Rank	Order	Name	Result	Notes
1st place, gold medalist(s)	2	Joshua Cheptegei (UGA)	13:50.83	
2nd place, silver medalist(s)	9	Mohammed Ahmed (CAN)	13:52.78	
3rd place, bronze medalist(s)	11	Edward Zakayo (KEN)	13:54.06	
4	14	Thomas Ayeko (UGA)	13:54.78	
5	3	Stewart McSweyn (AUS)	13:58.96	
6	10	Phillip Kipyeko (UGA)	13:59.59	
7	16	James Sugira (RWA)	14:03.51	
8	7	Morgan McDonald (AUS)	14:11.37	
9	6	Nicholas Kimeli (KEN)	14:13.97	
10	1	Amine Khadiri (CYP)	14:16.53	
11	13	David Kiprotich Bett (KEN)	14:18.80	
12	12	David McNeill (AUS)	14:24.51	
13	4	Grevazio Mpani (MAW)	14:30.66	
14	5	Christophe Tuyishimire (RWA)	14:39.29	
15	17	Chauncy Master (MAW)	14:50.25	
16	8	Patrick Kam (SOL)	16:08.77	
–	15	Toka Badboy (LES)	DQ	R 163.3b
