= Athletics at the 2018 Commonwealth Games – Men's 10,000 metres =

Men's 10,000 metres at the 2018 Commonwealth Games
- Venue: Carrara Stadium
- Dates: 13 April
- Competitors: 15 from 10 nations
- Winning time: 27:19.62 GR

Medalists
gold medal	Joshua Cheptegei	Uganda
silver medal	Mohammed Ahmed	Canada
bronze medal	Jacob Kiplimo	Uganda

The men's 10,000 metres at the 2018 Commonwealth Games, as part of the athletics programme, took place in the Carrara Stadium on 13 April 2018.

== Records ==
Prior to this competition, the existing world and Games records were as follows:

World record	Kenenisa Bekele (ETH)	26:17.53	Brussels, Belgium	26 August 2005
Games record	Wilberforce Talel (KEN)	27:45.39	Manchester, England	26 July 2002

== Schedule ==
The schedule was as follows:

Date	Time	Round
Friday 13 April 2018	21:10	Final

All times are Australian Eastern Standard Time (UTC+10)

== Results ==
With fifteen entrants, the event was held as a straight final.

=== Final ===
Rank	Order	Name	Result	Notes
1st place, gold medalist(s)	8	Joshua Cheptegei (UGA)	27:19.62	GR
2nd place, silver medalist(s)	12	Mohammed Ahmed (CAN)	27:20.56	
4	4	Jacob Kiplimo (UGA)	27:30.25	SB
5	15	Jake Robertson (NZL)	27:30.90	NR
6	9	Stephen Mokoka (RSA)	27:44.58	SB
7	11	Timothy Toroitich (UGA)	27:47.35	
8	2	Jonathan Ndiku (KEN)	27:56.24	
9	13	Andy Vernon (ENG)	28:17.11	
10	10	Josphat Bett Kipkoech (KEN)	28:56.22	
11	5	Stewart McSweyn (AUS)	28:58.22	
12	6	Kefasi Chitsala (MAW)	29:21.68	PB
13	3	Toka Badboy (LES)	31:22.38	
–	14	Rodgers Kwemoi (KEN)	DQ	
–	1	Patrick Tiernan (AUS)	DQ	R 163.3b
–	7	Simon Charley (VAN)	DNS	
