= Athletics at the 2020 Summer Olympics – Men's 10,000 metres =

Men's 10,000 metres at the Games of the XXXII Olympiad
- Olympic Athletics
- Venue: Japan National Stadium
- Date: 30 July 2021 (final)
- Competitors: 25 from 15 nations
- Winning time: 27:43.22

Medalists
1st place, gold medalist(s)		Selemon Barega	Ethiopia
2nd place, silver medalist(s)		Joshua Cheptegei	Uganda
3rd place, bronze medalist(s)		Jacob Kiplimo	Uganda

Official Video Highlights

The men's 10,000 metres event at the 2020 Summer Olympics took place on 30 July 2021 at the Japan National Stadium. 25 athletes competed. None of the 2016 medalists took part in the competition. Selemon Barega from Ethiopia won the event by 0.41 seconds, with Ugandans Joshua Cheptegei, the world record holder, and Jacob Kiplimo coming second and third, respectively. All of them won their first Olympic medal.

The medals for the competition were presented by Paul Tergat, Kenya; IOC Member, and the medalists' bouquets were presented by Lord Sebastian Coe, United Kingdom; World Athletics President.

== Summary ==
25 athletes started and right from the gun, Ugandan Stephen Kissa went for the lead. No other athlete showed interest in the early breakaway, allowing Kissa to open up as much as a 70 metre gap on the field in the first mile. Employing team tactics similar to bicycle racing, the second Ugandan Jacob Kiplimo held the leading position on the pack while world record holder Joshua Cheptegei cruised along near the back of the pack. After 5 laps, Selemon Barega decided to pull in the breakaway, with Rhonex Kipruto tagging along for the chase. It took them three more laps to bridge the gap.

As they reached contact with Kissa, Kissa accelerated again, opening up a smaller gap. With the peloton following the bridging duo, Barega fell back to the pack with Kipruto continuing to try to chase down Kissa. For the next 7 laps, Kipruto, would pull closer only to have Kissa open up another gap. Finally with 9 laps to go, Kipruto was able to get ahead of Kissa and open a gap of his own over the peloton as a whole. Once passed, Kissa fell back through the field and then walked off the track. Kipruto's gap on the field didn't hold more than two laps, but they continued to indulge him the leading position, pacing the field toward the chess match of the final laps. With just over four laps to go, Cheptegei decided it was time to take the lead.

As they reached three laps, Rodgers Kwemoi challenged for the lead, with Mohammed Ahmed tucked behind the leaders, but still the pack had a dozen runners in contention with two laps to go. As a few fell off the back, Ahmed took the lead down the backstretch, but on the home stretch Barega came forward to lead at the bell. Barega opened up a small gap, chased by the more gangly sprinting of his Ethiopian teammate Berihu Aregawi, indoor mile world record holder Yomif Kejelcha, Kiplimo and Cheptegei. Kejelcha couldn't handle the speed, Ahmed fell back, leaving only the two Ugandans to chase the two Ethiopians. Through the final turn, Kiplimo worked his way past Aregawi. Coming off the turn, Cheptegei also got past and the chase was on down the home stretch. Cheptegei passed Kiplimo but Barega's five metre lead was too much to make up. Barega crossed the finish line with arms outstretched taking gold over the world record holder, his final lap 53.94.

== Background ==
This was the 25th time the event is held, having appeared at every Olympics since 1912.

== Qualification ==
A National Olympic Committee (NOC) could enter up to 3 qualified athletes in the men's 10,000 metres event if all athletes meet the entry standard or qualify by ranking during the qualifying period. (The limit of 3 has been in place since the 1930 Olympic Congress.) The qualifying standard is 27:28.00. This standard was "set for the sole purpose of qualifying athletes with exceptional performances unable to qualify through the IAAF World Rankings pathway." The world rankings, based on the average of the best five results for the athlete over the qualifying period and weighted by the importance of the meet, will then be used to qualify athletes until the cap of 27 is reached. Because more than 27 athletes (after applying the 3-per-NOC limit) have met the qualifying standard, the world rankings are not used.

The qualifying period was originally from 1 January 2019 to 29 June 2020. Due to the COVID-19 pandemic, the period was suspended from 6 April 2020 to 30 November 2020, with the end date extended to 29 June 2021. The qualifying time standards could be obtained in various meets during the given period that have the approval of the IAAF. Both indoor and outdoor meets were eligible for qualifying. The most recent Area Championships may be counted in the ranking, even if not during the qualifying period.

NOCs cannot use their universality place in the 10,000 metres.

=== Men's 10,000 m ===
Entry number: initial target of 27. 30 runners qualified by Entry standard. 5 runners withdrew before the race.

Qualification standard	No. of athletes	NOC	Nominated athletes
Entry standard – 27:28.00	3	Ethiopia	Berihu Aregawi; Selemon Barega; Yomif Kejelcha
Entry standard – 27:28.00	3	Kenya	Rhonex Kipruto; Rodgers Kwemoi; Weldon Langat
Entry standard – 27:28.00	3	Uganda	Joshua Cheptegei; Jacob Kiplimo; Stephen Kissa
Entry standard – 27:28.00	3	United States	Grant Fisher; Woody Kincaid; Joe Klecker
Entry standard – 27:28.00	1	Australia	~~Stewart McSweyn~~; Patrick Tiernan
Entry standard – 27:28.00	1	Belgium	~~Bashir Abdi~~; Isaac Kimeli
Entry standard – 27:28.00	2	Great Britain	Sam Atkin; Marc Scott
Entry standard – 27:28.00	2	Japan	Akira Aizawa; Tatsuhiko Ito
Entry standard – 27:28.00	0	Bahrain	~~Birhanu Balew~~
Entry standard – 27:28.00	1	Canada	Mohammed Ahmed
Entry standard – 27:28.00	1	Eritrea	Aron Kifle
Entry standard – 27:28.00	1	France	Morhad Amdouni
Entry standard – 27:28.00	1	Italy	Yemaneberhan Crippa
Entry standard – 27:28.00	0	Morocco	~~Zouhair Talbi~~
Entry standard – 27:28.00	0	Norway	~~Sondre Nordstad Moen~~
Entry standard – 27:28.00	1	Spain	Carlos Mayo
Entry standard – 27:28.00	1	Switzerland	Julien Wanders
Entry standard – 27:28.00	1	Thailand	Kieran Tuntivate
World ranking	0		
Total	25		

== Competition format ==
The event consists of a single race.

== Records ==
Prior to this competition, the existing global and area records were as follows:

World record	Joshua Cheptegei (UGA)	26:11.00	Valencia, Spain	7 October 2020
Olympic record	Kenenisa Bekele (ETH)	27:01.17	Beijing, China	17 August 2008
World Leading	Jacob Kiplimo (UGA)	26:33.93	Ostrava, Czechia	19 May 2021

Area
Area	Time (s)	Athlete	Nation
Africa (records)	26:11.00 WR	Joshua Cheptegei	Uganda
Asia (records)	26:38.76	Abdullah Ahmad Hassan	Qatar
North, Central America and Caribbean (records)	26:44.36	Galen Rupp	United States
Europe (records)	26:46.57	Mo Farah	Great Britain
Oceania (records)	27:22.55	Patrick Tiernan	Australia
South America (records)	27:28.12	Marilson dos Santos	Brazil

== Schedule ==
All times are Japan Standard Time (UTC+9)

The men's 10,000 metres took place on a single day.

Date	Time	Round
Friday, 30 July 2021	19:00	Final

=== Final ===
Rank	Athlete	Nation	Time	Notes
1st place, gold medalist(s)	Selemon Barega	Ethiopia	27:43.22	
2nd place, silver medalist(s)	Joshua Cheptegei	Uganda	27:43.63	SB
3rd place, bronze medalist(s)	Jacob Kiplimo	Uganda	27:43.88	
4	Berihu Aregawi	Ethiopia	27:46.16	
5	Grant Fisher	United States	27:46.39	
6	Mohammed Ahmed	Canada	27:47.76	SB
7	Yomif Kejelcha	Ethiopia	27:52.03	
8	Rhonex Kipruto	Kenya	27:52.78	
9	Morhad Amdouni	France	27:53.58	
10	Yemaneberhan Crippa	Italy	27:54.05	SB
11	Aron Kifle	Eritrea	28:04.06	
12	Carlos Mayo	Spain	28:04.71	
13	Marc Scott	Great Britain	28:09.23	
14	Woody Kincaid	United States	28:11.01	
15	Joe Klecker	United States	28:14.18	
16	Akira Aizawa	Japan	28:18.37	SB
17	Isaac Kimeli	Belgium	28:31.91	
18	Patrick Tiernan	Australia	28:35.06	SB
19	Weldon Langat	Kenya	28:41.42	
20	Julien Wanders	Switzerland	28:55.29	SB
21	Tatsuhiko Ito	Japan	29:01.31	
22	Kieran Tuntivate	Thailand	29:01.92	
—	Sam Atkin	Great Britain	DNF	
—	Stephen Kissa	Uganda	DNF	
—	Rodgers Kwemoi	Kenya	DQ	
