= Mogos Shumay =

Eritrean long-distance runner

Mogos Shumay (born 1997) is an Eritrean long-distance runner.

In age-specific competitions, he finished seventh in the 10,000 metres at the 2016 World U20 Championships and finished fourteenth (and won a team bronze medal) in the junior race at the 2015 World Cross Country Championships. As a senior he finished 28th, and 4th team-wise, at the 2017 World Cross Country Championships.

His personal best times are 27:56.98 minutes in the 10,000 metres, achieved in May 2016 in Palo Alto; 1:01:09 hours in the half marathon, achieved in September 2015 in Copenhagen; and 2:16:25 hours in the marathon, achieved at the 2016 Sydney Marathon.
