= Jacob Kiplimo =

Ugandan long-distance runner (born 2000)

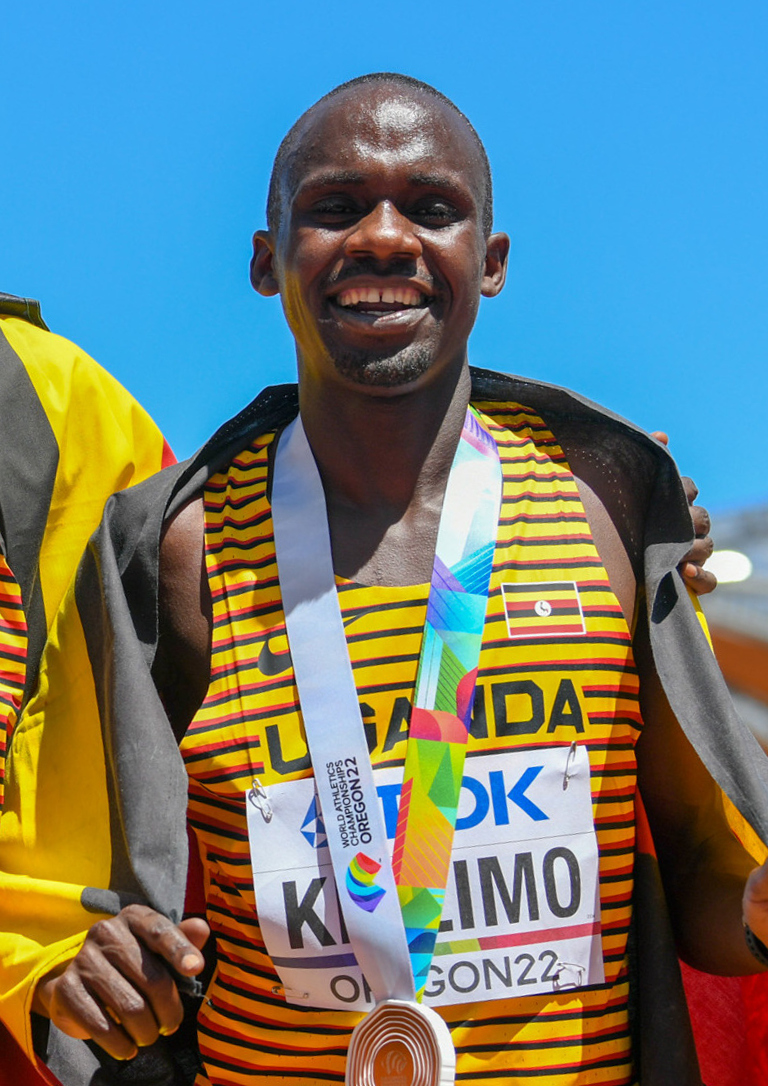
- Kiplimo at the 2022 World Athletics Championships in Eugene

Personal information
- Born: 14 November 2000 (age 25)
- Height: 1.78 m (5 ft 10 in)
- Weight: 56 kg (123 lb)

Sport
- Country: Uganda
- Sport: Athletics
- Event: Long-distance running
- Team: Nike
- Coached by: Iacopo Brasi

Achievements and titles
- Personal bests: 1500 m: 3:50.24 (Arezzo 2016); 3000 m: 7:26.64 NR (Rome 2020); 5000 m: 12:40.96 (Oslo 2024); 10,000 m: 26:33.93 (Ostrava 2021); Road; 10 km: 26:48 (Valencia 2024); 15 km: 40:07+ WB (Barcelona 2025); Half marathon: 56:42 (Barcelona 2025); Marathon: 2:00:28 NR (London 2026)
Medal record
Men's athletics
Representing Uganda
Olympic Games
Bronze medal – third place	2020 Tokyo	10,000 m
World Championships
Bronze medal – third place	2022 Eugene	10,000 m
Commonwealth Games
Gold medal – first place	2022 Birmingham	5000 m
Gold medal – first place	2022 Birmingham	10,000 m
World Cross Country Championships
Gold medal – first place	2017 Kampala	Junior race
Gold medal – first place	2019 Aarhus	Senior team
Gold medal – first place	2023 Bathurst	Senior race
Gold medal – first place	2024 Belgrade	Senior race
Gold medal – first place	2026 Tallahassee	Senior race
Silver medal – second place	2019 Aarhus	Senior race
Silver medal – second place	2024 Belgrade	Senior team
Bronze medal – third place	2023 Bathurst	Senior team
Bronze medal – third place	2026 Tallahassee	Senior team
World Half Marathon Championships
Gold medal – first place	2020 Gdynia	Individual
Bronze medal – third place	2020 Gdynia	Team
World Junior Championships
Silver medal – second place	2018 Tampere	10,000 m
Bronze medal – third place	2016 Bydgoszcz	10,000 m
World Marathon Majors
Gold medal – first place	2025 Chicago	Marathon
Silver medal – second place	2025 London	Marathon
Bronze medal – third place	2026 London	Marathon

Jacob Kiplimo (born 14 November 2000) is a Ugandan long-distance runner and former world record holder in the half marathon. A four-time individual World Cross Country champion, he won the junior title in 2017 and senior titles in 2023, 2024 and 2026. He also won 10,000m bronze medals at the 2020 Tokyo Olympics and the 2022 World Athletics Championships.

Kiplimo ran 56:42 at the 2025 Barcelona Half Marathon, but World Athletics did not ratify the performance because of assistance from a lead pace car. He subsequently set a ratified half-marathon world record of 57:20 at the 2026 Lisbon Half Marathon. His time of 2:00:28 at the 2026 London Marathon makes him the third-fastest marathoner of all time.

== Early life ==
Kiplimo was born on 14 November 2000. A member of the Sebei ethnic group, he grew up in Kween on Mount Elgon, living at a high altitude. His family grew maize. As a young child, Kiplimo would watch his older brothers train for athletic events. He would also travel to school by running a distance of 5 km. Kiplimo won a selection trial for the World Mountain Running Championships in 2015 but was not allowed to compete due to his age. Kiplimo then moved to Italy and began competing in events. After winning a 2017 cross country event in Uganda, he moved back.

At the age of fifteen, Kiplimo won the 10,000 metres bronze medal at the 2016 IAAF World U20 Championships behind fellow East Africans Rodgers Kwemoi and Aron Kifle. He ran 5000 metres in Rome that May at 13:24:40 minutes, which was a qualifying time for the Olympics. Kiplimo was then selected for 2016 Summer Olympics. Before the 2016 Rio Olympics, he improved his 5000 m best to 13:19.54 minutes. As the youngest entrant to the competition, he ran in the Olympic heats only, recording a time of 13:30.40 minutes for 11th in his race. He was the youngest ever competitor for Uganda at the Olympic Games.

At 16, Kiplimo won gold in the men's U20 race at the 2017 World Cross Country Championships in Kampala, the country's first-ever gold medal at a World Cross, covering a 8 km course in 22:40 minutes. He won the San Silvestre Vallecana 10 km road race in Madrid in a time of 26:41 on 31 December 2018. The course had an elevation drop, making it ineligible for world record status.

== Career ==
=== 2019 ===
At the Ugandan Cross Country Championships on 16 February in Tororo, Kiplimo defeated Joshua Cheptegei by placing first and second, respectively. In the men's senior race over 10 km, Kiplimo won by an 11-second lead over the 10,000 m world championship runner-up.

At the World Cross Country Championships in Aarhus, Denmark, Kiplimo finished second in the senior men's race four seconds after Joshua Cheptegei's winning time of 31:40. He won the gold medal in the teams ranking with Cheptegei from Uganda.

Kiplimo did not run in the 10,000 metres at the World Athletics Championships in Doha because of an injury.

On 31 December, Kiplimo ran the Saint Silvester Road Race (15 km) in São Paulo and was beaten by Kibiwott Kandie at the finish line. Kandie won in 42:59, a new course record, with Kiplimo finishing in 43:00.

=== 2020 ===
On 8 September, Kiplimo won the 5000 m run in Ostrava, Czech Republic in a time of 12:48.63 and improved his personal best of 13:13.64 set as a 16-year-old at the 2017 Prefontaine Classic. Selemon Barega was the runner up with a time 12:49.08, while his personal best of 12:43.02 was the fifth-fastest ever at the time. On 17 September, Kiplimo won a Diamond League 3000 m run in Rome with a time of 7:26.64. Kiplimo won the Half Marathon World Championship in a time of 58:49 on 17 October in Gdynia, Poland. His time was a Ugandan record and championship record.

On 6 December, he competed in the Valencia Half Marathon against Kibiwott Kandie, Rhonex Kipruto, and Alexander Mutiso. They all broke the previous world record of 58:01, set by Geoffrey Kamworor in 2019. Kandie set the new world record time at 57:32. Kiplimo placed second in the race with a time of 57:37.

=== 2021 ===
On 21 March 2021, Kiplimo competed at the Campaccio cross country race in San Giorgio su Legnano, Italy. Despite falling during the ninth kilometer of the race, he won a 10 km in 29:07. Ethiopia's Nibret Melak finished second, and Kiplimo's younger brother Oscar Chelimo finished third. On 19 May, Kiplimo returned to the track racing 10,000 m at the 60th Ostrava Golden Spike. He pulled away from Bahrain's Birhanu Balew to win the race. Kiplimo finished in a personal best time of 26:33.93, which made him the seventh-fastest 10,000 m performer of all time and the second-fastest Ugandan in history over the distance behind world record holder Joshua Cheptegei's 26:11.00.

On 21 November 2021, Kiplimo set a half marathon world record at 57:31 in Lisbon. His record was broken by Yomif Kejelcha, who ran a time of 57:30 at the 2024 Valencia Half Marathon.

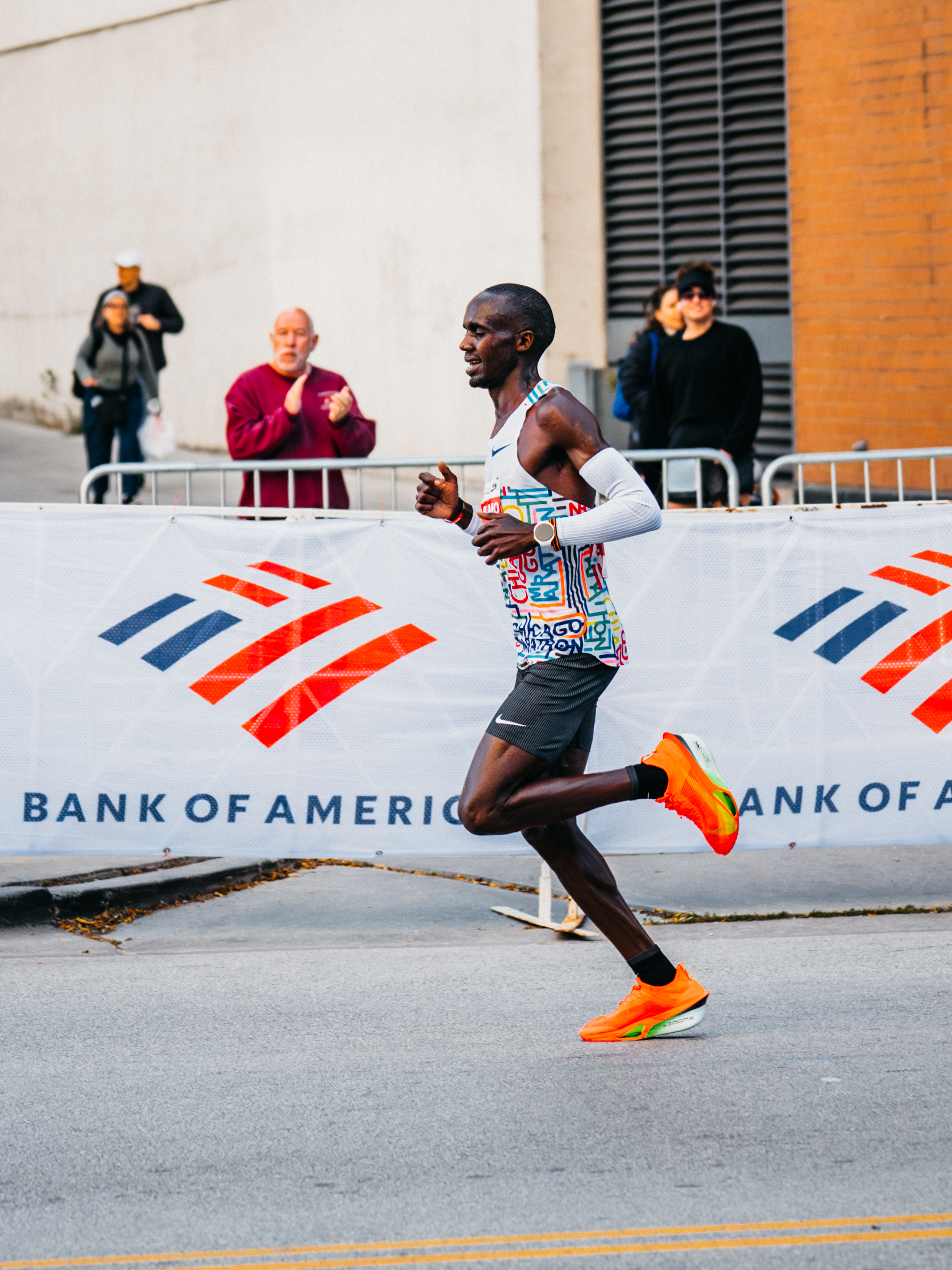
Jacob Kiplimo one mile before winning the 2025 Chicago Marathon.

=== 2023 ===
On 18 February, Kiplimo won the gold medal in the 10-kilometer race at the World Cross Country Championships held in Bathurst, Australia with a time of 29:17. Ethiopian Berihu Aregawi finished second in 29:26 followed by Joshua Cheptegei (29:37), world record holder for the 5000 m and 10,000 m, who had been defending his title from Aarhus 2019.

=== 2025 ===
On 16 February, Kiplimo regained the world record in the half marathon, finishing the Barcelona Half Marathon in 56 minutes and 42 seconds. On 5 February 2026, that record was stripped by World Athletics because it is suspected that the lead car of the race offered Kiplimo a "pacing advantage". Barcelona Half Marathon race direction later stated that they will appeal this decision.

On 27 April, Kiplimo made his marathon debut at the 2025 London Marathon, finishing in second behind Sabastian Sawe with a time of 2:03:37, a Ugandan national record.

On 12 October, Kiplimo won the 2025 Chicago Marathon, finishing in 2:02:23 and marking his first marathon win.

=== 2026 ===
On 8 March, Kiplimo returned to the EDP Lisbon Half Marathon and retook the half marathon world record at 57:20.

On 26 April, Kiplimo ran the third-fastest marathon in history at the 2026 London Marathon, finishing in 2:00:28. The race also saw Sabastian Sawe and Yomif Kejelcha finish in 1:59:30 and 1:59:41, respectively, all three surpassing the previous world record of 2:00:35 set by Kelvin Kiptum.

== Achievements ==
All information from World Athletics profile.

=== Personal bests ===
- 1500 metres – 3:50.24 (Arezzo 2016)
- 3000 metres – 7:26.64 (Rome 2020) NR
- 5000 metres – 12:41.73 (Oslo 2023)
- 10,000 metres – 26:33.93 (Ostrava 2021)
- 10,000 meters – 29:17 (Sydney 2023)

Road

- 10 kilometres – 27:31 (Manchester 2019)
- 15 kilometers – 40:07+ (Barcelona 2025) – World Best
- Half marathon – 56:42 (Barcelona 2025) – (not ratified as a World Record due to "assistance from a lead pace car")
- Marathon – 2:00:28 (London 2026)

=== International competitions ===
Representing Uganda
Year	Competition	Venue	Position	Event	Result
2016	World U20 Championships	Bydgoszcz, Poland	3rd	10,000 m	27:26.68 PB
2016	Olympic Games	Rio de Janeiro, Brazil	26th (h)	5000 m	13:30.40
2017	World Cross Country Championships	Kampala, Uganda	1st	Junior race	22:40
2017	World Cross Country Championships	Kampala, Uganda	4th	Junior team	59 pts
2017	World Championships	London, United Kingdom	22nd (h)	5000 m	13:30.92
2018	Commonwealth Games	Gold Coast, Australia	4th	10,000 m	27:30.25
2018	World U20 Championships	Tampere, Finland	6th	5,000 m	13:23.35
2018	World U20 Championships	Tampere, Finland	2nd	10,000 m	27:40.36
2019	World Cross Country Championships	Aarhus, Denmark	2nd	Senior race	31:44
2019	World Cross Country Championships	Aarhus, Denmark	1st	Team	20 pts
2020	World Half Marathon Championships	Gdynia, Poland	1st	Half marathon	58:49 CR
2021	Olympic Games	Tokyo, Japan	5th	5,000 m	13:02.40
2021	Olympic Games	Tokyo, Japan	3rd	10,000 m	27:43.88
2022	World Championships	Eugene, United States	3rd	10,000 m	27:27.97
2022	Commonwealth Games	Birmingham, United Kingdom	1st	5000 m	13:08.08 SB
2022	Commonwealth Games	Birmingham, United Kingdom	1st	10,000 m	27:09.19 SB GR
2023	World Cross Country Championships	Bathurst, Australia	1st	Senior race	29:17
2023	World Cross Country Championships	Bathurst, Australia	3rd	Team	37 pts
2024	Olympic Games	Paris, France	8th	10,000 m	26:46.39
Road races
2015	We Run Rome	Rome, Italy	3rd	10 km	28:49
2016	Cuneo ASICS Run	Cuneo, Italy	1st	10 km	28:26
2018	Giro al Sas	Trento, Italy	1st	10 km	28:17
2018	San Silvestre Vallecana	Madrid, Spain	1st	10 km	26:41
2019	Great Manchester Run	Manchester, United Kingdom	1st	10 km	27:31
2019	MTN Kampala Half Marathon	Kampala, Uganda	1st	Half marathon	1:01:53
2019	Saint Silvester Road Race	São Paulo, Brazil	2nd	15 km	43:00
2020	Valencia Half Marathon	Valencia, Spain	2nd	Half marathon	57:37
2021	Lisbon Half Marathon	Lisbon, Portugal	1st	Half marathon	57:31
2022	Ras Al Khaimah Half Marathon	Ras Al Khaimah, United Arab Emirates	1st	Half marathon	57:56
2022	Great North Run	Newcastle, United Kingdom	1st	Half marathon	59:33
2023	New York City Half Marathon	New York, United States	1st	Half marathon	1:01:31
2025	Barcelona Half Marathon	Barcelona, Spain	1st	Half marathon	56:42
2025	London Marathon	London, England	2nd	Marathon	2:03:37
2025	21K Buenos Aires	Buenos Aires, Argentina	1st	Half marathon	58:29
2025	Chicago Marathon	Chicago, United States	1st	Marathon	2:02:23
2026	Lisbon Half Marathon	Lisbon, Portugal	1st	Half marathon	57:20
2026	London Marathon	London, England	3rd	Marathon	2:00:28

=== Circuit wins ===
- Diamond League
  - 2020: Rome Golden Gala (3000m)

Records
Preceded by (Kenya) Kibiwott Kandie	Men's half marathon world record holder 21 November 2021 – present	Succeeded by Incumbent
