= Selemon Barega =

Ethiopian long-distance runner (born 2000)

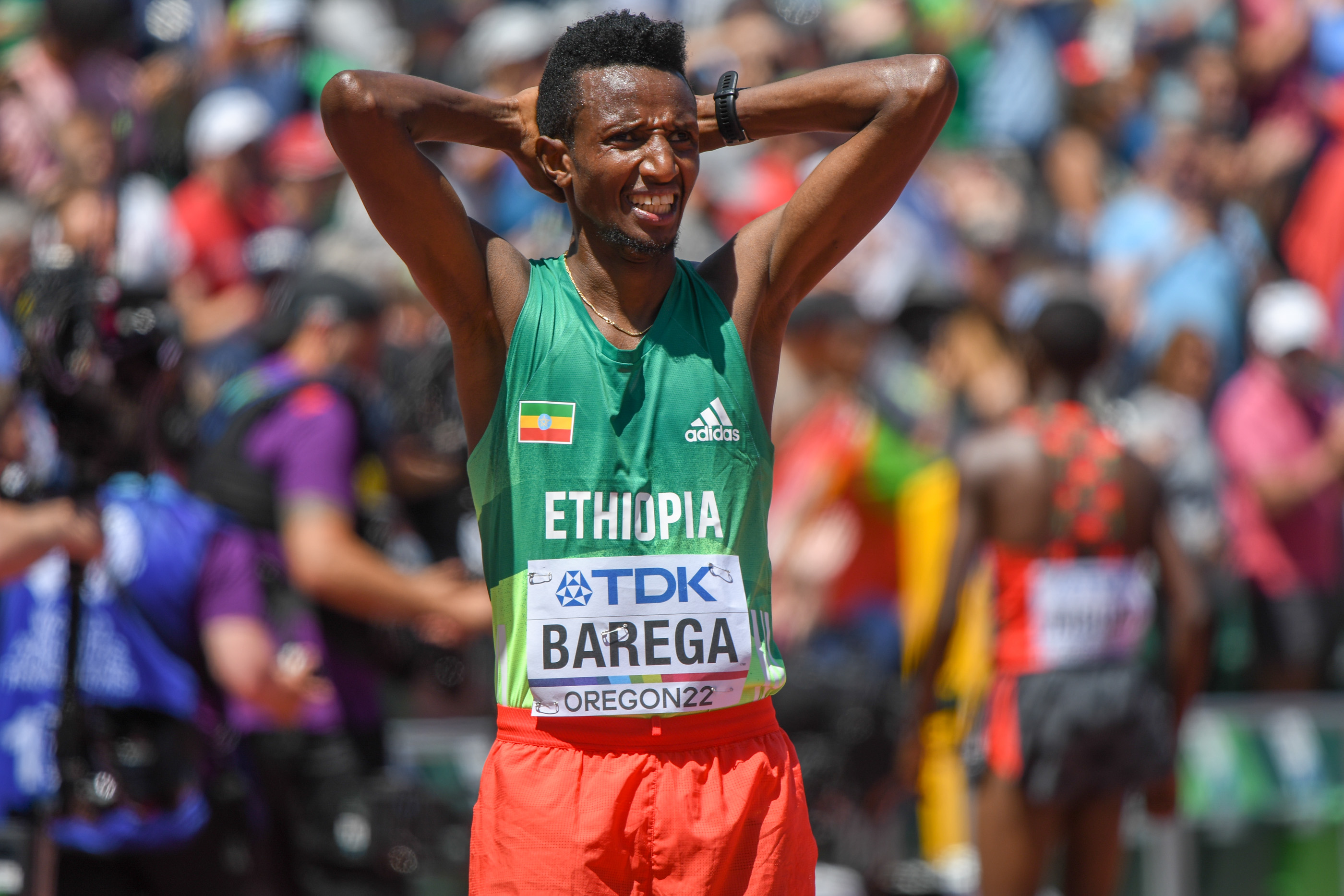
- Selemon at the 2022 World Athletics Championships in Eugene

Personal information
- Born: 20 January 2000 (age 26) Bitana village, Gurage zone, Ethiopia
- Height: 1.70 m (5 ft 7 in)
- Weight: 53 kg (117 lb)

Sport
- Country: Ethiopia
- Sport: Athletics
- Event: Long-distance running

Achievements and titles
- Personal bests: 3000 m: 7:26.10 (Eugene 2023); Two miles: 8:08.69 WJB (Stanford 2019); 5000 m: 12:43.02 WJR (Brussels 2018); 10,000 m: 26:44.48 (Paris 2024); Marathon: 2:04:58 (Berlin 2026)
Medal record
Men's athletics
Representing Ethiopia
Olympic Games
Gold medal – first place	2020 Tokyo	10,000 m
World Championships
Silver medal – second place	2019 Doha	5000 m
Bronze medal – third place	2023 Budapest	10,000 m
World Indoor Championships
Gold medal – first place	2022 Belgrade	3000 m
Silver medal – second place	2018 Birmingham	3000 m
Bronze medal – third place	2024 Glasgow	3000 m
Diamond League
First place	2018	5000 m
World Junior Championships
Gold medal – first place	2016 Bydgoszcz	5000 m
African Junior Championships
Gold medal – first place	2017 Tlemcen	5000 m
World Youth Championships
Gold medal – first place	2017 Nairobi	3000 m
World Cross Country Championships
Silver medal – second place	2023 Bathurst	Senior team

Selemon Barega Shirtaga (born 20 January 2000) is an Ethiopian long-distance runner. He won the gold medal in the 10,000 metres at the 2020 Tokyo Olympics, silver for the 5,000 metres at the 2019 World Championships in Doha and bronze in the 10,000 metres at the 2023 World Championships in Budapest. Selemon is a two-time 3,000 metres World Indoor Championship medallist, taking silver in 2018, and gold in 2022.

He won gold medals at the 2016 World Under-20 Championships (5,000m), and 2017 World U18 Championships (3,000m). Selemon represented Ethiopia in the 5,000m at the 2017 World Championships in London, finishing fifth in the final.

== Career ==
Selemon was born in the Gurage area of Ethiopia.

He began competing internationally in 2016. On 23 July, he won the 5,000 metres at the World U20 Championships in Bydgoszcz, Poland with a time of 13:21.21.

=== 2017–18 ===
In 2017, Selemon competed in the junior race of the World Cross Country Championships, finishing fifth. He won the African U20 Championships in Tlemcen, Algeria over 5,000 m clocking 13:51.43 on 2 July.

On 6 July, Selemon clocked his first sub-13 minute 5,000 m at the Lausanne Diamond League meeting, placing second in 12:55.58. On 16 July, he won the 3,000 m at the Nairobi World U18 Championships, clocking 7:47.16. At the 2017 World Championships in Athletics in London, he placed fifth in the men's 5000 m final in a time of 13:35.34; the race was won by his compatriot Muktar Edris.

In 2018, Selemon placed second over the 3,000 m at the World Indoor Championships in Birmingham, United Kingdom, clocking a time of 8:15.59 on 4 March. On 25 May, he won the two mile race at the Prefontaine Classic in Eugene, Oregon. His next major championship was on 14 July at the World U20 Championships in Tampere, Finland, where he placed fourth in 13:21.16. On 31 August, Selemon set a world U20 record in the 5000 m at the Brussels Diamond League clocking a time of 12:43.02. This performance ranked him as the fifth fastest 5,000 m performer of all time, behind Joshua Cheptegei, Kenenisa Bekele, Haile Gebrselassie, and Daniel Komen.

=== 2019–20 ===
Selemon competed in the senior men's race of the World Cross Country Championships in Aarhus, Denmark. He placed fourth and was the first Ethiopian to finish in a race won by Uganda's Joshua Cheptegei. He placed second at the Shanghai Diamond League on 18 May and the Rome Diamond League on 6 June. On 13 June, Selemon won the 3,000 m at the Bislett Games in Oslo, Norway, clocking 7:32.17. On 30 June, he placed third over two miles at the Prefontaine Classic in Eugene, Oregon with a time of 8:08.69. On 5 July, he was second at the Lausanne Diamond League, clocking 13:01.99 in the 5,000 m. On 17 July, Selemon was second at the Ethiopian Trials in Hengelo, Netherlands in a personal best time of 26:49.46, finishing behind Hagos Gebrhiwet. On 29 August, he was fifth over the 5,000 m at the Zürich Diamond League. On 27 September, he won his heat of the men's 5,000 m at the 2019 World Championships in Athletics in Doha, Qatar. On 30 September, he finished second in the final in 12:59.70, outsprinted by compatriot Muktar Edris.

In February 2020, Selemon competed at several indoor track races in Europe. His next race was on 8 September at the Golden Spike Ostrava, where he contested the 5,000 m, placing second with a time of 12:49.08. Despite attempting to sprint past Jacob Kiplimo in the final 100 m, the Ugandan held on to win in a time of 12:48.63. Selemon next raced the 1,500 m at the Galà dei Castelli in Switzerland, placing third at 3:36.07 on 15 September. At the Doha Diamond League on 25 September, he raced 1,500 m in 3:32.97, placing second. He headed back to Ethiopia, where on 26 December, he ran 1,500 m at the Ethiopian Clubs Competition in Addis Ababa, winning in 3:38.1.

=== 2021–present ===
In 2021, Selemon won the Olympic candidate trial competition in Addis Ababa, recording a time of 27:58.5. He competed at several indoor track races in January and February, including a 7:26.10 3000 m, clocking him second place behind compatriot Getnet Wale. He became the third fastest performer in history over the indoor 3000 m with his performance, behind Kenya's Daniel Komen, who clocked 7:24.90 on 6 February 1998, and Wale, who won the race in 7:24.98. Selemon next raced two indoor 1500 m races on the World Athletics Indoor Tour winning both, first at the Copernicus Cup in Toruń, Poland he clocked a 3:32.97 on 17 February, and then on 24 February, a 3:35.42 performance in Madrid, Spain. His performance in Toruń made him the eighth fastest performer of all time in the indoor 3000 m. Selemon's first outdoor track 5000 m race of the year came in Bergamo, Italy on 12 May, where he clocked 13:02.47, beaten by Kenya's Mark Owon Lomuket. Selemon next raced at the Ethiopian Trials in Hengelo, where he won the 10,000 m in a time of 26:49.51 holding off Yomif Kejelcha who was second, Berihu Aregawi placed third. The race was tactical, with Selemon putting in surges and then slowing down before it came down to a last lap sprint finish.

On 30 July 2021, at the age of 21, Selemon won the 10,000 m at the 2020 Tokyo Olympics, outsprinting world record holder Joshua Cheptegei and World Half Marathon champion Jacob Kiplimo of Uganda to win in 27:43.22. Brutal humidity meant that the winning time of 27:43.22 was the slowest in an Olympic final since 1992, but Selemon's close was sublime as he ripped the last kilometer in 2:24.9 and last lap in 53.94. This win made him the fourth Ethiopian to win the 10,000 m title at the Olympics, the other three being Kenenisa Bekele (2004, 2008), Haile Gebrselassie (1996, 2000), and Miruts Yifter (1980).

== Achievements ==
=== International competitions ===
Representing Ethiopia
Year	Competition	Venue	Position	Event	Result
2016	World U20 Championships	Bydgoszcz, Poland	1st	5000 m	13:21.21
2017	African U20 Championships	Tlemcen, Algeria	1st	5000 m	13:51.43
2017	World U18 Championships	Nairobi, Kenya	1st	3000 m	7:47.16
2017	World Championships	London, United Kingdom	5th	5000 m	13:35.34
2018	World Indoor Championships	Birmingham, United Kingdom	2nd	3000 m i	8:15.59
2018	African Championships	Asaba, Nigeria	4th	5000 m	13:52.27
2019	World Championships	Doha, Qatar	2nd	5000 m	12:59.70
2021	Olympic Games	Tokyo, Japan	1st	10,000 m	27:43:22
2022	World Indoor Championships	Belgrade, Serbia	1st	3000 m i	7:41.38
2022	World Championships	Eugene, United States	12th	5000 m	13:19.62
2022	World Championships	Eugene, United States	5th	10,000 m	27:28.39
2023	World Cross Country Championships	Bathurst, Australia	12th	Senior race	30:16
2023	World Cross Country Championships	Bathurst, Australia	2nd	Team	32 pts
2023	World Championships	Budapest, Hungary	3rd	10,000 m	27:52.72
2024	World Indoor Championships	Glasgow, United Kingdom	3rd	3000 m i	7:43.64
2024	Olympic Games	Paris, France	7th	10,000 m	26:44.48
2025	World Championships	Tokyo, Japan	6th	10,000 m	28:57.21

=== Personal bests ===
- 1500 metres – 3:32.97 (Doha 2020)
  - 1500 metres indoor – 3:32.97 (Toruń 2021)
- 3000 metres – 7:26.28 (Eugene 2023)
  - 3000 metres indoor – 7:25.82 (Toruń 2024)
- Two miles – 8:08.69 (Stanford 2019) World under-20 best
- 5000 metres – 12:43.02 (Brussels 2018) World under-20 record
- 10,000 metres - 26:44.73 (Hengelo 2022)
- Half Marathon - 57:50 (Valencia 2023)
- Marathon - 2:05:15 (Seville 2025)

=== Circuit wins and titles, National titles ===
- Diamond League 5000 metres champion: 2018
  - 2018 – Eugene Prefontaine Classic (two miles), Stockholm Bauhaus-Galan (5000m), Brussels Memorial Van Damme (5000m)
  - 2019 – Oslo Bislett Games (3000m)
  - 2022 – Paris Meeting (5000m)
- Ethiopian Athletics Championships
  - 10,000 metres: 2019
