= Martin Musau =

Ugandan long-distance runner

Personal information
- Nationality: Ugandan
- Born: October 5, 1998 (age 27)

Sport
- Sport: Athletics
- Event: Long-distance running

Martin Musau (born 5 October 1998) is a Ugandan long-distance runner who specializes in road running events, particularly the marathon. He won the 2021 Hamburg Marathon on his debut over the distance and has since improved his personal best to 2:08:42.

== Early career ==
Musau began his career competing in track events. In 2017, he placed second in the 10,000 metres at the Uganda National Championships, setting a personal best of 29:05.00. He also competed in the 5000 metres that year, achieving a personal best of 14:02.0h. In 2018, he placed 10th in the U20 race at the Africa Cross Country Championships. The following year, he won the 10,000 metres at the Uganda National Championships and set a 10 km road personal best of 29:33.

== Senior career ==
=== 2021: Marathon debut ===
Prior to his marathon debut, Musau won the MTN Kampala Half Marathon, setting a personal best of 1:04:16. He then made a successful marathon debut at the 2021 Hamburg Marathon, winning the race in 2:10:14.

=== 2023–2025: Continued progression ===
In 2023, Musau significantly improved his personal best at the Hamburg Marathon, finishing seventh in a competitive field with a time of 2:08:45.

A year later, on 28 April 2024, at the Enschede Marathon, he secured a podium finish by placing third with a new personal best of 2:08:42. This strong showing positioned him as a contender for major marathon events, including the 2024 Haspa Marathon Hamburg.

He finished fifth at the Copenhagen Marathon in May 2025 with a time of 2:12:46.

== Personal bests ==
Musau's personal bests are:

- 5000 metres – 14:02.0h (Kampala, 2017)
- 10,000 metres – 29:05.00 (Kampala, 2017)
- 10 kilometres – 29:33 (Kabale, 2019)
- Half marathon – 1:04:16 (Kampala, 2021)
- Marathon – 2:08:42 (Enschede, 2024)
