= Joshua Cheptegei =

Ugandan long-distance runner (born 1996)

Joshua Cheptegei OLY
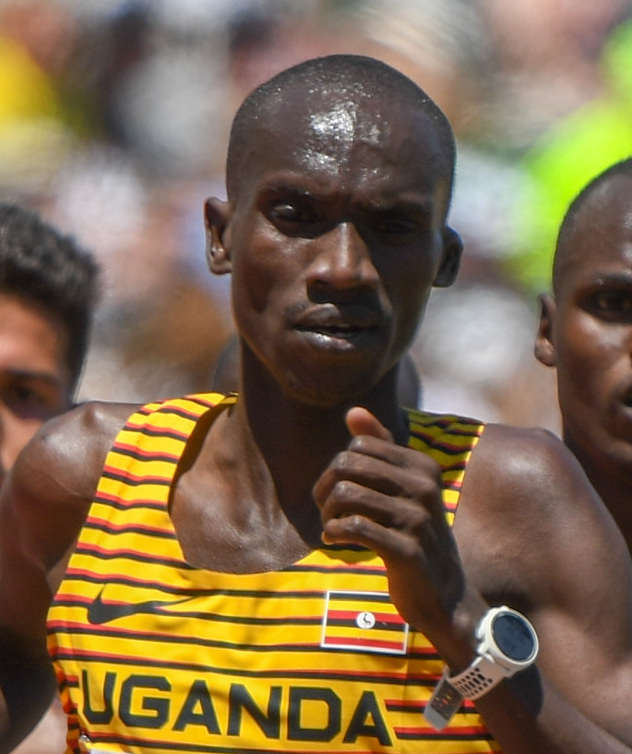
- Cheptegei at the 2022 World Athletics Championships in Eugene

Personal information
- Full name: Joshua Kiprui Cheptegei
- Born: 12 September 1996 (age 30) Kapsewui, Kapchorwa District, Uganda
- Height: 1.83 m (6 ft 0 in)
- Weight: 61 kg (134 lb)

Sport
- Country: Uganda
- Sport: Athletics
- Event: Long-distance running
- Team: NN Running Team
- Coached by: Addy Ruiter

Achievements and titles
- Olympic finals: 2016 Rio de Janeiro; 10,000 m, 6th; 5000 m, 8th; 2020 Tokyo; 10,000 m, Silver; 5000 m, Gold; 2024 Paris; 10,000 m, Gold
- World finals: 2015 Beijing; 10,000 m, 9th; 2017 London; 10,000 m, Silver; 2019 Doha; 10,000 m, Gold; 2022 Eugene; 10,000 m, Gold; 5000 m, 9th; 2023 Budapest; 10,000 m, Gold
- Highest world ranking: 1st (10,000 m, 2023)
- Personal bests: 1500 m: 3:37.36 (Kampala 2021); 3000 m: 7:33.24 (Ostrava 2021); 2 miles: 8:07.54 NB (Stanford 2019); 5000 m: 12:35.36 WR (Monaco 2020); 10,000 m: 26:11.00 WR (Valencia 2020); Road; 5 km: 12:51 NR (Monaco 2020); 10 km: 26:38 NR (Valencia 2019); 15 km: 41:05 (Nijmegen 2018); Half Marathon: 58:26 (Copenhagen 2026); Marathon: 2:04:52 (Amsterdam 2025)
Medal record
Men's athletics
Representing Uganda
Olympic Games
Gold medal – first place	2020 Tokyo	5000 m
Gold medal – first place	2024 Paris	10,000 m
Silver medal – second place	2020 Tokyo	10,000 m
World Championships
Gold medal – first place	2019 Doha	10,000 m
Gold medal – first place	2022 Eugene	10,000 m
Gold medal – first place	2023 Budapest	10,000 m
Silver medal – second place	2017 London	10,000 m
Diamond League
First place	2019	5000 m
Commonwealth Games
Gold medal – first place	2018 Gold Coast	5000 m
Gold medal – first place	2018 Gold Coast	10,000 m
World Junior Championships
Gold medal – first place	2014 Eugene	10,000 m
World Cross Country Championships
Gold medal – first place	2019 Aarhus	Senior race
Gold medal – first place	2019 Aarhus	Senior team
Bronze medal – third place	2017 Kampala	Senior team
Bronze medal – third place	2023 Bathurst	Senior race
Bronze medal – third place	2023 Bathurst	Senior team
World Road Running Championships
Bronze medal – third place	2026 Copenhagen	Half marathon

Joshua Kiprui Cheptegei (born 12 September 1996) is a Ugandan long-distance runner. He is the current world record holder for the 5000 metres and the 10,000 metres, and once held the world-best time over the 15 kilometres distance.

Cheptegei is the reigning Olympic champion in the 10000 m and three-time World champion in the 10,000 m. Cheptegei also won a gold medal in the 5000 m and 10,000 m at the 2018 Commonwealth Games and at the 2019 IAAF World Cross Country Championships. At the 2024 Olympic Games, Cheptegei won gold in the 10,000 metres, becoming the Olympic champion and setting a new Olympic record in the process.

Cheptegei is the tenth man in history to hold the 5000 m and 10,000 m world records concurrently, both set in 2020.

== Early life ==
Cheptegei was born on 12 September 1996 in Kapsewui, Kapchorwa District, Uganda. In primary school, he first played football and tried out long jump and triple jump, but he switched to running when he discovered his talent in distance running.

Cheptegei studied procurement and logistics management in Uganda and is employed by the Uganda National Police. His coach is Addy Ruiter. In the timeframe from March to May 2020, he reduced his weekly training sessions from 12 to 8.

== Career ==
=== 2015–2019: Career beginnings ===
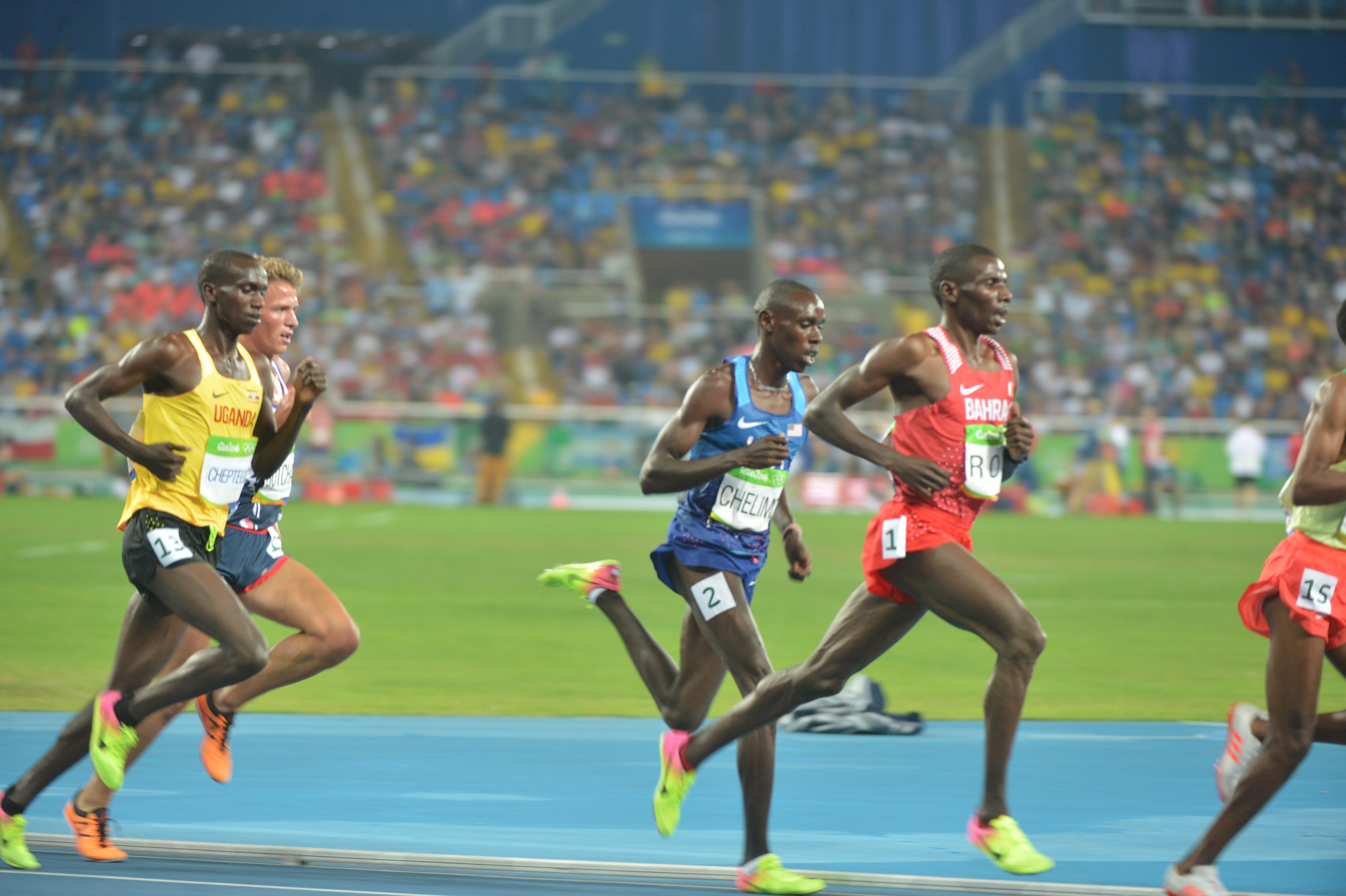
Cheptegei (L in yellow) races the 5000 m at the 2016 Rio Olympics, where he finished eighth.

Cheptegei competed in the 10,000 metres at the 2015 World Championships in Beijing, finishing ninth. He ran at the 2016 Summer Olympics in the 5000 metres and 10,000 metres, finishing eighth and sixth. respectively. He is a silver medallist in the 10,000 metres at the 2017 World Championships in London. Cheptegei was the 5000 metres and 10,000 metres champion at the 2018 Commonwealth Games.

Cheptegei is a four-time winner of the Zevenheuvelenloop 15 km road race in Nijmegen, Netherlands. In 2018, he set the world record for a 15 km road race. Abrar Osman finished second with 42:34 and the 2017 5000 m world champion Muktar Edris placed third with 42:56. On 19 February 2022, the record was broken by Cheptegei's compatriot Jacob Kiplimo, who ran a 15 km split of 40:43 min at the Ras Al Khaimah Half Marathon.

Cheptegei was the winner of the senior men's race at the 2019 IAAF World Cross Country Championships in Aarhus, Denmark. He won in 31:40 on the 10.24 km course. Ugandan teammate Jacob Kiplimo finished second in 31:44, while Thomas Ayeko placed seventh and Joseph Ayeko tenth; Uganda won the team first-place title.

=== 2019–2020: World records ===
On 1 December 2019, Cheptegei set a new 10 km road race record in Valencia, Spain. His time of 26:38 improved on the previous world record, set by Leonard Komon in 2010, by 6 seconds. This mark has since been lowered to 26:24, the world record being held, as of October 2020, by Rhonex Kipruto of Kenya, who also incidentally set it in Valencia just six weeks later, on 12 January 2020.

On 16 February 2020, he set a new 5 km road race world record in Monaco with a time of 12:51. The previous ratified record was 13:22, set by Robert Keter on 9 November 2019 in Lille, France, and the previous fastest time ever recorded over the distance was 13:00 set by Sammy Kipketer on 26 March 2000 in Carlsbad, USA. This record stood for nearly two years until broken by Berihu Aregawi, who ran 12:49 at the Cursa dels Nassos meet in Barcelona on 31 December 2021.

On 13 August 2020, a day before the Herculis meet of the Diamond League in Monaco, Cheptegei announced that he aimed to return to the track and run his first official race in the season with a world record time in the 5000 metres, which would be more than 20 seconds faster than his personal best on a track. At the meet on the next day, with the help of expert pace-making from Roy Hoornweg, Stephen Kissa, and Matthew Ramsden, he set a new world record in the 5000 metres with a time of 12:35.36, which broke Kenenisa Bekele's 16-year-old record—the longest duration in the history of the event—by almost 2 seconds. His splits were 2:31.87; 5:03.77; 7:35.14 and 10:05.46. Kenenisa congratulated Cheptegei from Addis Ababa.

On 7 October 2020, in Valencia, he set a world-record time of 26:11.00 in the 10,000 metres, which improved on Kenenisa Bekele's 15-year-old record by more than 6 seconds.

=== 2021–present: Olympic medals ===
Cheptegei won gold in the 5000 metres and silver in the 10,000 metres at the 2020 Summer Olympics.

At the 2022 World Athletics Championships, Cheptegei won the 10,000 metres and placed ninth in the 5000 metres.

At the 2023 World Athletics Cross Country Championships, Cheptegei placed third to his countryman Jacob Kiplimo and Ethiopian Berihu Aregawi. Cheptegei successfully defended his 10,000 metres title at the 2023 World Athletics Championships. Later that year, he made his marathon debut at the Valencia Marathon, running 2:08:59 to place 37th.

At the 2024 Olympic Games in Paris, Cheptegei won gold in the 10,000 metres final, in a new Olympic record of 26:43.14. The former Olympic record was Kenenisa Bekele's 27:01.17 set at the 2008 Games in Beijing. Shortly after winning gold in the 10000 meter event, Cheptegei announced on Instagram that he would not be defending his 5000-metre gold medal from Tokyo, citing failure to recover from the race. Cheptegei also hinted that he will not pursue another Olympic Games on the track, and instead focus more on road racing in the future. In September 2026, Cheptegei placed third in the half marathon at the 2026 World Athletics Road Running Championships in Copenhagen, Demark, in a new personal best time of 58:26.

== Achievements ==
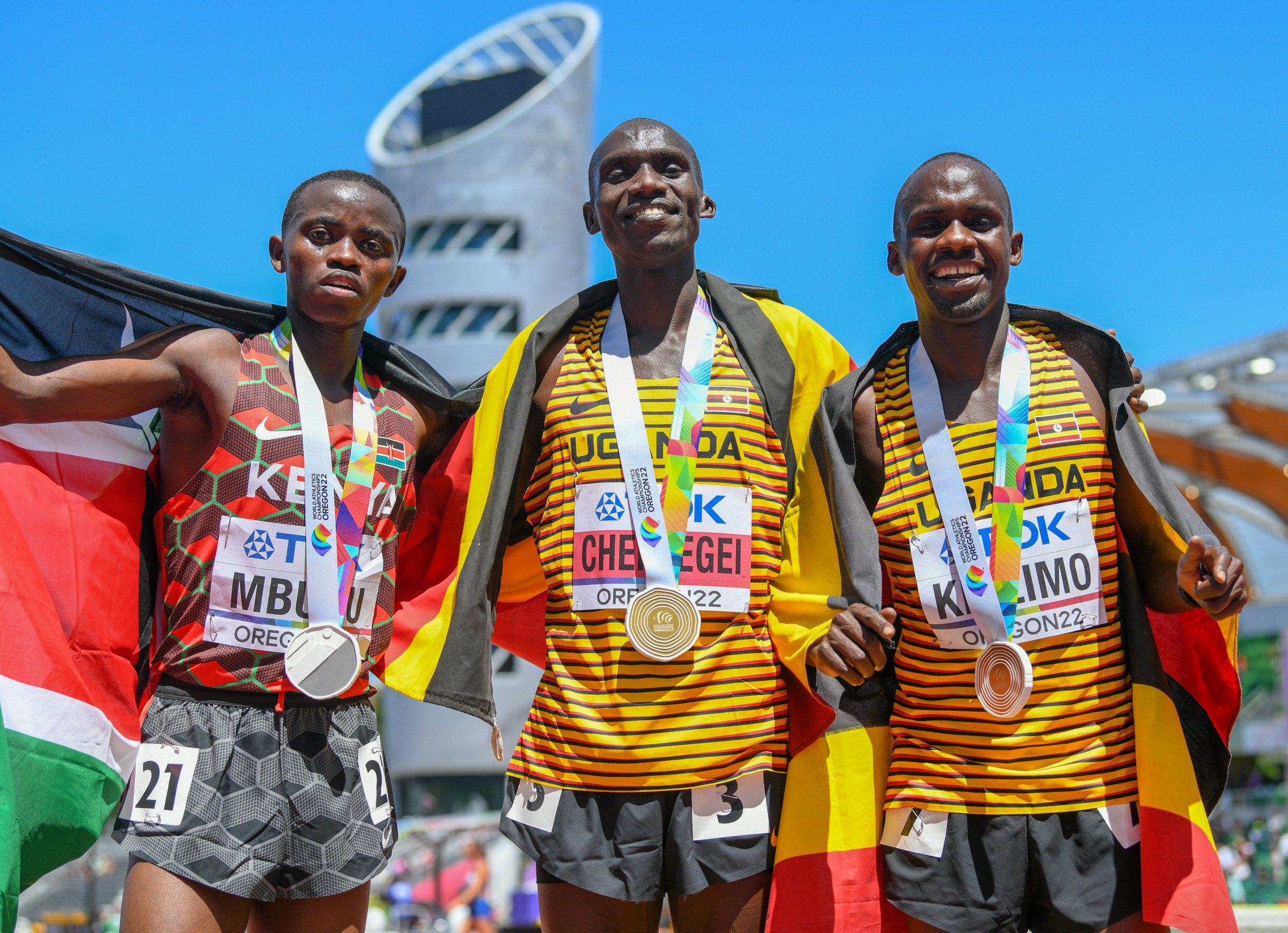
Cheptegei (C) with his gold for the 10,000 m at the 2022 World Athletics Championships in Eugene.

=== International competitions ===
Representing Uganda
Year	Competition	Venue	Position	Event	Time
2014	World Junior Championships	Eugene, United States	4th	5000 m	13:32.84
2014	World Junior Championships	Eugene, United States	1st	10,000 m	28:32.86
2014	African Championships	Marrakesh, Morocco	–	10,000 m	DNF
2015	African Junior Championships	Addis Ababa, Ethiopia	1st	10,000 m	29:58.70
2015	World Championships	Beijing, China	9th	10,000 m	27:48.89
2016	Olympic Games	Rio de Janeiro, Brazil	8th	5000 m	13:09.17
2016	Olympic Games	Rio de Janeiro, Brazil	6th	10,000 m	27:10.06 SB
2017	World Cross Country Championships	Kampala, Uganda	30th	Senior race	30:08
2017	World Cross Country Championships	Kampala, Uganda	3rd	Senior team	72 pts
2017	World Championships	London, United Kingdom	2nd	10,000 m	26:49.94 SB
2018	Commonwealth Games	Gold Coast, Australia	1st	5000 m	13:50.83 SB
2018	Commonwealth Games	Gold Coast, Australia	1st	10,000 m	27:19.62 GR
2019	World Cross Country Championships	Aarhus, Denmark	1st	Senior race	31:40
2019	World Cross Country Championships	Aarhus, Denmark	1st	Senior team	20 pts
2019	World Championships	Doha, Qatar	1st	10,000 m	26:48.36 WL
2021	Olympic Games	Tokyo, Japan	1st	5000 m	12:58.15
2021	Olympic Games	Tokyo, Japan	2nd	10,000 m	27:43.63
2022	World Championships	Eugene, United States	9th	5000 m	13:13.12
2022	World Championships	Eugene, United States	1st	10,000 m	27:27.43
2023	World Cross Country Championships	Bathurst, Australia	3rd	Senior race	29:37
2023	World Cross Country Championships	Bathurst, Australia	3rd	Team	37 pts
2023	World Championships	Budapest, Hungary	1st	10,000 m	27:51.42
2024	Olympic Games	Paris, France	1st	10,000 m	26:43.14 OR
2026	World Road Running Championships	Copenhagen, Denmark	3rd	Half marathon	58:26

=== Circuit wins and titles ===
- Diamond League 5000 metres champion: 2019
  - 2019: Eugene Prefontaine Classic in Stanford (Two miles, WL PB), Zürich Weltklasse (5000 m, PB)
  - 2020: Monaco Herculis (5000 m, WR)
  - 2021: Eugene (Two miles)
  - 2022: Eugene (5000 m)

== Community activism ==
Joshua Cheptegei collaborated with the UNDP to participate in the Elgon half marathon together with other community activists, some of which included Lanie Banks with the aims of protecting the environment, keeping girls in school and ending Gender-based Violence. He urged fellow athletes to help the needy.

== See also ==
- Stephen Kiprotich
- Moses Ndiema Kipsiro
- Lanie Banks
- Kapchora District
- Jacob Kiplimo
- Selemon Barega
- Athletics at the 2020 Summer Olympics – Men's 10,000 metres

Records
Preceded by (Ethiopia) Kenenisa Bekele	Men's 5000 m World Record Holder; 14 August 2020 –	Succeeded by Incumbent
Preceded by (Ethiopia) Kenenisa Bekele	Men's 10,000 m World Record Holder; 7 October 2020 –	Succeeded by Incumbent
