= Rodgers Kwemoi =

Kenyan long-distance runner

Personal information
- Full name: Rodgers Kwemoi Chumo
- Born: 3 March 1997 (age 29) Mount Elgon District, Kenya
- Height: 1.62 m (5 ft 4 in)
- Weight: 49 kg (108 lb)

Sport
- Country: Kenya
- Sport: Athletics
- Event: Long-distance running

Achievements and titles
- Personal bests: 5000 m: 13:18.98 (2016); 10,000 m: 27:43.85 (2016)

Rodgers Kwemoi Chumo (born 3 March 1997) is a Kenyan long-distance runner specialising in the 5000 metres and 10,000 metres.

Kwemoi is currently serving a six-year competition ban resulting from breaches of anti-doping rules with an end date of 7 August 2029.

== Career before 17 July 2016 ==
Born in Kenya's Mount Elgon District, he made his international debut in the junior race at the 2015 IAAF World Cross Country Championships, where his tenth-place finish helped the Kenyan men to the team title. As a result of this, he was signed up by the Asian Kogyo corporate team in Japan.

== Career between 18 July 2016 to 8 August 2023 ==
During the period 2016 to 2023, Kwemoi participated in numerous competitions and at the time was recorded in various positions including medal places. However a doping ban issued on 24 April 2024 determined that all of Kwemoi's results from 18 July 2016 to 8 August 2023 "shall be disqualified with all resulting Consequences, including the forfeiture of any medals, titles, ranking points, prizes, and prize and appearance money."

Significant results from the disqualified period include the 10,000 m gold medal at the 2016 IAAF World U20 Championships in championship record time, a 10,000 m bronze medal at the 2018 Commonwealth Games event in Gold Coast, Queensland, fourth place at the 10,000m final at the World Championships in Doha and seventh place at the 2020 Tokyo Olympics. 10,000 m.

== Doping ban ==
In August 2023, Kwemoi was provisionally suspended by the Athletics Integrity Unit for a "Prohibited Substance/Method" violation. Subsequently, the AIU banned him for 6 years and he was stripped of 7 years worth of results, citing 18 instances of suspected blood doping.

== International competitions ==
Year	Competition	Venue	Position	Event	Notes
Representing Kenya
2015	World Cross Country Championships	Guiyang, China	10th	Junior race	24:11
2015	World Cross Country Championships	Guiyang, China	1st	Team	19 pts
2016	World U20 Championships	Bydgoszcz, Poland	DQ	10,000 m	~~27:25.23~~
2018	Commonwealth Games	Gold Coast, Australia	DQ	10,000 m	~~27:28.66~~
2019	World Championships	Doha, Qatar	DQ	10,000 m	~~26:55.36~~
2021	Olympic Games	Tokyo, Japan	DQ	10,000 m	~~27:50.06~~
2022	World Championships	Eugene, United States	DQ	10,000 m	~~27:52.26~~
Marathons representing Kenya
2022	Istanbul Half Marathon	Istanbul, Turkey	DQ	Half marathon	~~59:15 CR~~

== Personal bests ==
Outdoor

Event	Time	Date	Place
5000 m	13:18.98	2 April 2016	Kumamoto
10000 m	27:43.85	24 April 2016	Kobe
