= Australia at the 2019 World Athletics Championships =

Australia at the 2019 World Championships in Athletics
- WA code: AUS

in Doha, Qatar 27 September 2019 – 6 October 2019
- Competitors: 59 (25 men and 34 women) in 31 events
- Medals Ranked 17th: Gold 1 Silver 0 Bronze 0 Total 1

World Championships in Athletics appearances (overview)
- 1976; 1980; 1983; 1987; 1991; 1993; 1995; 1997; 1999; 2001; 2003; 2005; 2007; 2009; 2011; 2013; 2015; 2017; 2019; 2022; 2023; 2025

Australia competed at the 2019 World Championships in Athletics in Doha, Qatar, from 27 September to 6 October 2019. Australia was represented by 59 athletes.

== Medalists ==
Medal	Athlete	Event	Date
Gold	Kelsey-Lee Barber	Women's javelin throw	1 October

== Results ==
=== Men ===
Track and road events

Athlete	Event	Preliminary		Heat		Semifinal		Final	
Athlete	Event	Result	Rank	Result	Rank	Result	Rank	Result	Rank
Rohan Browning	100 metres	N/A		10.40	40	did not advance			
Steven Solomon	400 metres	—N/a		45.82	22 q	45.54 SB	20	did not advance	
Peter Bol	800 metres	—N/a		1:46.92	31	did not advance			
Luke Mathews	800 metres	—N/a		1:50.16	39	did not advance			
Ryan Gregson	1500 metres	—N/a		3:38.69	29	did not advance			
Stewart McSweyn	1500 metres	—N/a		3:36.88	10 q	3:37.95	21	did not advance	
Matthew Ramsden	1500 metres	—N/a		3:47.59	41 qR	3:37.16 PB	15	did not advance	
Morgan McDonald	5000 metres	—N/a		13:26.80	17	—N/a		did not advance	
Stewart McSweyn	5000 metres	—N/a		13:20.58	4 Q	—N/a		13:30.41	12
Patrick Tiernan	5000 metres	—N/a		13:28.42	20	—N/a		did not advance	
Julian Spence	Marathon	—N/a						2:19:40	39
Nicholas Hough	110 metres hurdles	—N/a		13.60	21 q	13.61	21	did not advance	
Ben Buckingham	3000 metres steeplechase	—N/a		8:42.86	42	—N/a		did not advance	
Alex Beck; Murray Goodwin; Ian Halpin; Steven Solomon	4 × 400 metres relay	—N/a		3:05.49	14	—N/a		did not advance	
Dane Bird-Smith	20 kilometres walk	—N/a						1:32:11	14
Rhydian Cowley	20 kilometres walk	—N/a						DNF	

Field events

Athlete	Event	Qualification		Final	
Athlete	Event	Result	Rank	Result	Rank
Joel Baden	High jump	2.17	25	did not advance	
Brandon Starc	High jump	2.29	4 q	2.30 SB	6
Henry Frayne	Long jump	7.86	13	did not advance	
Darcy Roper	Long jump	7.82	15	did not advance	
Henry Smith	Long jump	7.50	24	did not advance	
Matthew Denny	Discus throw	65.08	3 q	65.43 PB	6

Combined events – Decathlon

Athlete	Event	100 m	LJ	SP	HJ	400 m	110H	DT	PV	JT	1500 m	Final	Rank
Cedric Dubler	Result	10.75	7.25	12.43	2.02	48.41	14.13	44.30 PB	4.70	59.04 PB	4:34.75	8101	11
Cedric Dubler	Points	917	874	633	822	889	958	752	819	723	714	8101	11

=== Women ===
Track and road events

Athlete	Event	Heat		Semifinal		Final	
Athlete	Event	Result	Rank	Result	Rank	Result	Rank
Bendere Oboya	400 metres	51.21 PB	7 Q	51.58	13	did not advance	
Gabriella O'Grady	400 metres	54.99	44	did not advance			
Catriona Bisset	800 metres	2:05.33	39	did not advance			
Morgan Mitchell	800 metres	2:02.13	12 Q	2:04.76	22	did not advance	
Carley Thomas	800 metres	2:04.65	37	did not advance			
Georgia Griffith	1500 metres	4:07.78	14 q	4:17.15	22	did not advance	
Linden Hall	1500 metres	4:08.12	17 q	4:06.39	10	did not advance	
Jessica Hull	1500 metres	4:08.71	24 Q	4:01.80 PB	8	did not advance	
Melissa Duncan	5000 metres	15:37.37	20	—N/a		did not advance	
Sinead Diver	10,000 metres	—N/a				31:25.49 PB WMR	14
Ellie Pashley	10,000 metres	—N/a				31:18.89 PB	13
Rochelle Rodgers	Marathon	—N/a				3:05:12	35
Brianna Beahan	100 metres hurdles	13.11	23 Q	13.38	23	did not advance	
Michelle Jenneke	100 metres hurdles	12.98 SB	20 q	13.09	19	did not advance	
Celeste Mucci	100 metres hurdles	13.14	25	did not advance			
Lauren Boden	400 metres hurdles	56.00	22 q	55.94	21	did not advance	
Sarah Carli	400 metres hurdles	56.37	25 Q	55.43 PB	16	did not advance	
Sara Klein	400 metres hurdles	56.97	29	did not advance			
Paige Campbell	3000 metres steeplechase	9:44.80 PB	27	—N/a		did not advance	
Genevieve Gregson	3000 metres steeplechase	9:27.74 SB	9 q	—N/a		9:23.84 SB	10
Georgia Winkcup	3000 metres steeplechase	9:50.21	36	—N/a		did not advance	
Melissa Breen; Maddie Coates; Kristie Edwards; Celeste Mucci; Nana Owusu-Afriyie	4 × 100 metres relay	DNF		—N/a		did not advance	
Ellie Beer; Rebecca Bennett; Lauren Boden; Bendere Oboya; Gabriella O'Grady; Caitlin Sargent-Jones	4 × 400 metres relay	3:28.64 SB	10	—N/a		did not advance	
Katie Hayward	20 kilometres walk	—N/a				DQ	
Jemima Montag	20 kilometres walk	—N/a				1:36:54	10

Field events

Athlete	Event	Qualification		Final	
Athlete	Event	Result	Rank	Result	Rank
Nicola McDermott	High jump	1.90	15	did not advance	
Liz Parnov	Pole vault	4.35	28	did not advance	
Brooke Stratton	Long jump	6.58	9 q	6.46	10
Kelsey-Lee Barber	Javelin throw	61.08	10 q	66.56	Gold
