= 2019 World Athletics Championships – Men's 1500 metres =

Men's 1500 metres at the 2019 World Championships
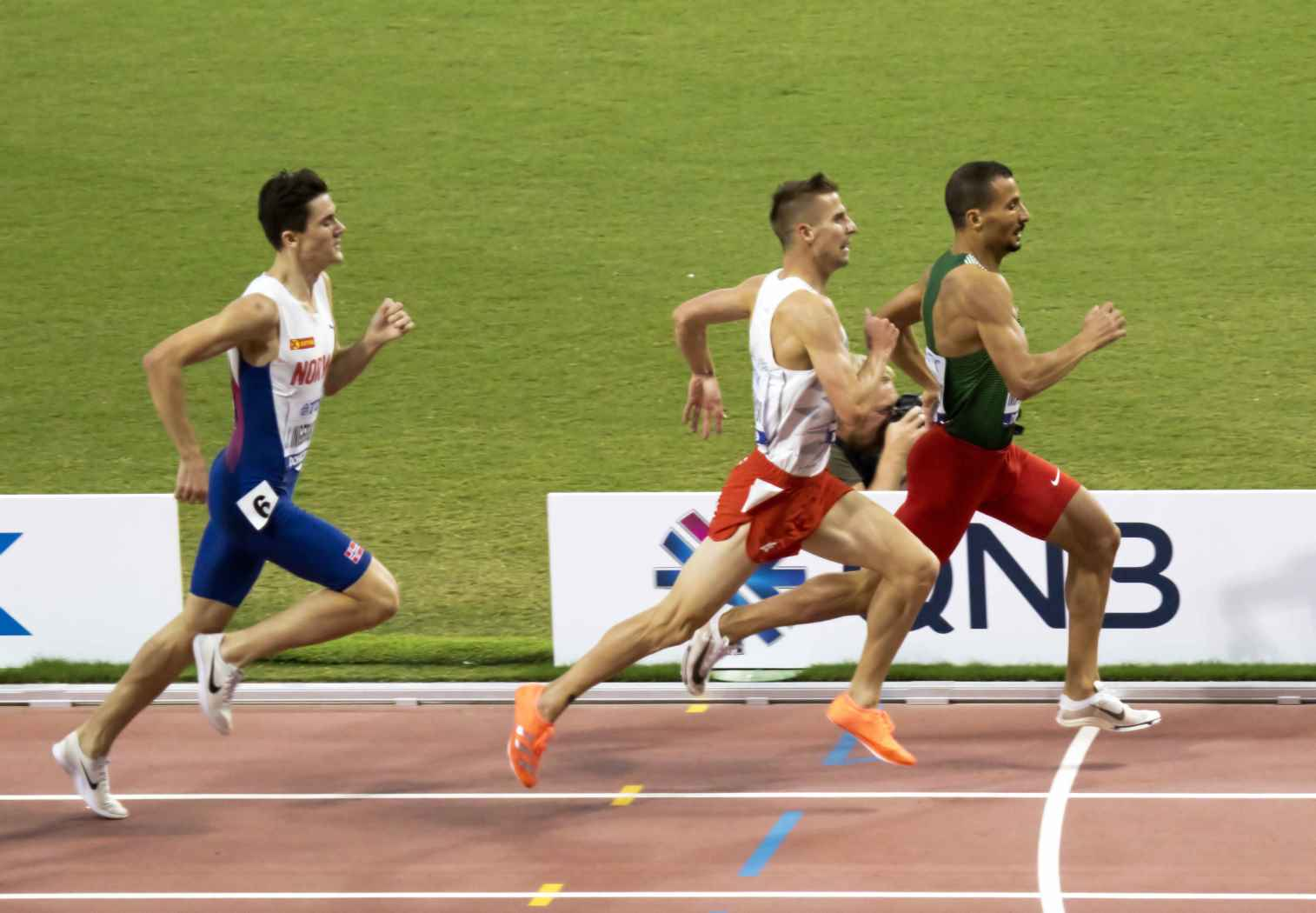
- 1500m men's final finish
- Venue: Khalifa International Stadium
- Dates: 3 October (heats); 4 October (semi-finals); 6 October (final)
- Competitors: 43 from 24 nations
- Winning time: 3:29.26

Medalists
gold medal	Timothy Cheruiyot	Kenya
silver medal	Taoufik Makhloufi	Algeria
bronze medal	Marcin Lewandowski	Poland

Video on YouTube Official Video

The men's 1500 metres at the 2019 World Athletics Championships was held at the Khalifa International Stadium in Doha from 3 to 6 October 2019. The winning margin was 2.12 seconds which as of 2024 remains the only time the men's 1,500 metres has been won by more than two seconds at these championships (the 1991 final was won by exactly two seconds).

== Summary ==
In modern history, championship races are slow strategic affairs where fast athletes are unwilling to sacrifice their medals by running a fast pace. Fast races happen in more controlled environments with planned pace setters at major European meets.

Timothy Cheruiyot didn't get the memo. From the gun, Cheruiyot and his Kenyan teammate Ronald Kwemoi went out hard, breaking away by 2 metres in the first 200. The guys who usually drop to the back realized this was serious and started scrambling to the front. Olympic gold medalist Matthew Centrowitz Jr. and silver medalist Taoufik Makhloufi formed a chase group 5 metres back, Jakob Ingebrigtsen leading the peloton another 5 metres back. Over the next lap, the chasers fell back to the peloton, the breakaway now 10 metres. Cheruiyot kept up the pressure, over the next half lap, Kwemoi fell off his back. By the bell, Kwemoi was back to the peloton, again led by Makhloufi. The next on the front were Ingebrigtsen and Josh Kerr. It appeared a more mature 23 year old Cheruiyot had learned from his fast early pace at the 2015 World Relays where he fell apart on the last lap. Here, there was no sign of letting up. Down the backstretch, coming from 9th place, Marcin Lewandowski ran around the outside of the pack, hitting Makhloufi's shoulder by the beginning of the final turn. The other competitors were already fully extended and couldn't make any dramatic moves. Cheruiyot crossed the finish line 17 metres ahead of Makhloufi. Lewandowski was able to stay a metre behind Makhloufi, trying to nudge ahead in vain at the finish line. The others fell off the back with only Ingebrigtsen remaining two metres behind Lewandowski and Jake Wightman yet another metre back.

While 3:29.26 was "only" the 57th best performance ever, it was the third fastest Olympic or World Championship performance, only bettered by the 1999 championships when the number 2 miler ever, Noah Ngeny chased world record holder Hicham El Guerrouj to the championship record, and unlike that race, this was done off the front, solo.

== Records ==
Before the competition records were as follows:

World record	Hicham El Guerrouj (MAR)	3:26.00	Rome, Italy	14 July 1998
Championship record	Hicham El Guerrouj (MAR)	3:27.65	Sevilla, Spain	24 August 1999
World Leading	Timothy Cheruiyot (KEN)	3:28.77	Lausanne, Switzerland	5 July 2019
African Record	Hicham El Guerrouj (MAR)	3:26.00	Rome, Italy	14 July 1998
Asian Record	Rashid Ramzi (BHR)	3:29.14	Rome, Italy	14 July 2006
North, Central American and Caribbean record	Bernard Lagat (USA)	3:29.30	Rieti, Italy	28 August 2005
South American Record	Hudson Santos de Souza (BRA)	3:33.25	Rieti, Italy	28 August 2005
European Record	Mo Farah (GBR)	3:28.81	Monaco	19 July 2013
Oceanian record	Nick Willis (NZL)	3:29.66	Monaco	17 July 2015

The following records were set at the competition:

Record	Perf.	Athlete	Nat.	Date
Polish	3:31.46	Marcin Lewandowski	POL	6 Oct 2019
Swedish	3:33.70	Kalle Berglund	SWE	6 Oct 2019

== Qualification standard ==
The standard to qualify automatically for entry was 3:36.00 or 3:53.10 for the mile.

== Schedule ==
The event schedule, in local time (UTC+3), was as follows:

Date	Time	Round
3 October	22:00	Heats
4 October	20:10	Semi-finals
6 October	19:40	Final

== Results ==
=== Heats ===
The first six in each heat (Q) and the next six fastest (q) qualified for the semi-finals.

Rank	Heat	Name	Nationality	Time	Notes
1	3	Ayanleh Souleiman	Djibouti	3:36.16	Q
2	3	Taoufik Makhloufi	Algeria	3:36.18	Q
3	3	Kalle Berglund	Sweden	3:36.19	Q
4	3	Neil Gourley	Great Britain & N.I.	3:36.31	Q
5	3	Craig Engels	United States	3:36.35	Q
6	3	Ronald Musagala	Uganda	3:36.54	Q
7	3	Ronald Kwemoi	Kenya	3:36.66	q
8	3	Jesús Gómez	Spain	3:36.72	q
9	2	Timothy Cheruiyot	Kenya	3:36.82	Q
10	3	Stewart McSweyn	Australia	3:36.88	q
11	2	Josh Kerr	Great Britain & N.I.	3:36.99	Q
12	2	Ben Blankenship	United States	3:37.13	Q
13	2	Filip Ingebrigtsen	Norway	3:37.26	Q
14	2	Abdelaati Iguider	Morocco	3:37.44	Q
15	2	Kevin López	Spain	3:37.62	Q
16	1	Jakob Ingebrigtsen	Norway	3:37.67	Q
17	1	Alexis Miellet	France	3:37.69	Q
18	1	Matthew Centrowitz Jr.	United States	3:37.69	Q
19	1	Jake Wightman	Great Britain & N.I.	3:37.72	Q
20	1	Marcin Lewandowski	Poland	3:37.75	Q
21	1	Amos Bartelsmeyer	Germany	3:37.80	Q
22	1	Samuel Tefera	Ethiopia	3:37.82	q
23	2	Isaac Kimeli	Belgium	3:37.87	q
24	2	Youssouf Hich Bachir	Djibouti	3:37.93	q
25	1	Adel Mechaal	Spain	3:37.95	
26	2	Kumari Taki	Kenya	3:37.98	
27	1	Filip Sasínek	Czech Republic	3:38.17	
28	1	George Manangoi	Kenya	3:38.39	
29	1	Ryan Gregson	Australia	3:38.69	
30	1	Abdi Waiss Mouhyadin	Djibouti	3:38.79	
31	3	Ismael Debjani	Belgium	3:39.11	
32	3	Jakub Holuša	Czech Republic	3:39.79	
33	1	Hicham Ouladha	Morocco	3:39.86	
34	2	Jinson Johnson	India	3:39.86	
35	3	Abdullahi Jama Mohamed	Somalia	3:40.84	
36	2	Teddese Lemi	Ethiopia	3:41.32	qR
37	3	Abdirahman Saeed Hassan	Qatar	3:42.24	
38	2	Musulman Dzholomanov	Kyrgyzstan	3:45.07	
39	1	Abraham Kipchirchir Rotich	Kenya	3:45.19	
40	3	Yach Majok Koon Wol	South Sudan	3:46.24	
41	2	Matthew Ramsden	Australia	3:47.59	qR
42	2	Paulo Amotun Lokoro	Athlete Refugee Team	3:48.98	
43	1	Lucirio Antonio Garrido	Venezuela	3:52.93	
	3	Brahim Kaazouzi	Morocco	DNS	
	2	Rabil Doukkana	France	DNS	

=== Semi-finals ===
The first five in each heat (Q) and the next two fastest (q) qualified for the final.

Rank	Heat	Name	Nationality	Time	Notes
1	2	Marcin Lewandowski	Poland	3:36.50	Q
2	1	Timothy Cheruiyot	Kenya	3:36.53	Q
3	2	Ronald Kwemoi	Kenya	3:36.53	Q
4	2	Jakob Ingebrigtsen	Norway	3:36.58	Q
5	2	Josh Kerr	Great Britain & N.I.	3:36.58	Q
6	1	Taoufik Makhloufi	Algeria	3:36.69	Q
7	1	Neil Gourley	Great Britain & N.I.	3:36.69	Q
8	1	Craig Engels	United States	3:36.69	Q
9	1	Kalle Berglund	Sweden	3:36.72	Q
10	2	Youssouf Hich Bachir	Djibouti	3:36.72	Q, SB
11	2	Matthew Centrowitz Jr.	United States	3:36.77	q, SB
12	2	Jake Wightman	Great Britain & N.I.	3:36.85	q
13	1	Ben Blankenship	United States	3:36.98	
14	1	Filip Ingebrigtsen	Norway	3:37.00	
15	2	Matthew Ramsden	Australia	3:37.16	PB
16	2	Ronald Musagala	Uganda	3:37.19	
17	1	Alexis Miellet	France	3:37.39	
18	1	Isaac Kimeli	Belgium	3:37.50	
19	2	Kevin López	Spain	3:37.56	
20	2	Amos Bartelsmeyer	Germany	3:37.74	
21	1	Stewart McSweyn	Australia	3:37.95	
22	1	Ayanleh Souleiman	Djibouti	3:38.35	
23	1	Teddese Lemi	Ethiopia	3:38.79	PB
24	1	Jesús Gómez	Spain	3:40.29	
25	2	Abdelaati Iguider	Morocco	3:42.23	
	2	Samuel Tefera	Ethiopia	DNF	

=== Final ===
The final was started on 6 October at 19:40.

Rank	Name	Nationality	Time	Notes
1st place, gold medalist(s)	Timothy Cheruiyot	Kenya	3:29.26	
2nd place, silver medalist(s)	Taoufik Makhloufi	Algeria	3:31.38	SB
3rd place, bronze medalist(s)	Marcin Lewandowski	Poland	3:31.46	NR
4	Jakob Ingebrigtsen	Norway	3:31.70	
5	Jake Wightman	Great Britain & N.I.	3:31.87	PB
6	Josh Kerr	Great Britain & N.I.	3:32.52	PB
7	Ronald Kwemoi	Kenya	3:32.72	SB
8	Matthew Centrowitz Jr.	United States	3:32.81	SB
9	Kalle Berglund	Sweden	3:33.70	NR
10	Craig Engels	United States	3:34.24	
11	Neil Gourley	Great Britain & N.I.	3:37.30	
12	Youssouf Hich Bachir	Djibouti	3:37.96	
