= Germany at the 2019 World Athletics Championships =

- Flag of Germany
- WA code: GER
- National federation: German Athletics Association
- Website: leichtathletik.de (in German)

in Doha, Qatar 27 September – 6 October 2019
- Competitors: 65 (35 men and 30 women) in 32 events
- Medals Ranked 7th: Gold 2 Silver 0 Bronze 4 Total 6

World Athletics Championships appearances (overview)
- 1991; 1993; 1995; 1997; 1999; 2001; 2003; 2005; 2007; 2009; 2011; 2013; 2015; 2017; 2019; 2022; 2023; 2025

Germany competed at the 2019 World Athletics Championships in Doha, Qatar, from 27 September to 6 October 2019.

== Medalists ==
| Medal | Athlete | Event | Date |
|---|---|---|---|
| Gold | Niklas Kaul | Decathlon | 3 October |
| Gold | Malaika Mihambo | Long jump | 6 October |
| Bronze | Gesa Felicitas Krause | 3000 metres steeplechase | 30 September |
| Bronze | Christina Schwanitz | Shot put | 3 October |
| Bronze | Konstanze Klosterhalfen | 5000 metres | 5 October |
| Bronze | Johannes Vetter | Javelin throw | 6 October |

== Entrants ==
- including alternates

=== Men ===
Track and road events

| Athlete | Event | Heat | | Semifinal | | Final | |
| Athlete | Event | Result | Rank | Result | Rank | Result | Rank |
|---|---|---|---|---|---|---|---|
| Steven Müller | 200 metres | 20.69 | 33 | Did not advance | | | |
| Marc Reuther | 800 metres | 1:47.31 | 33 | Did not advance | | | |
| Amos Bartelsmeyer | 1500 metres | 3:37.80 | 21 Q | 3:37.74 | 20 | Did not advance | |
| Sam Parsons | 5000 metres | 13:38.53 | 23 | —N/a | | Did not advance | |
| Richard Ringer | 5000 metres | 13:49.20 | 29 | —N/a | | Did not advance | |
| Luke Campbell | 400 metres hurdles | 50.20 | 23 Q | 50.00 | 21 | Did not advance | |
| Constantin Preis | 400 metres hurdles | 50.93 | 31 | Did not advance | | | |
| Karl Bebendorf | 3000 metres steeplechase | 8:32.58 | 31 | —N/a | | Did not advance | |
| Martin Grau | 3000 metres steeplechase | 8:26.79 SB | 24 | —N/a | | Did not advance | |
| Julian Reus; Joshua Hartmann; Roy Schmidt; Marvin Schulte | 4 × 100 metres relay | 38.24 SB | 12 | —N/a | | Did not advance | |
| Nils Brembach | 20 kilometres walk | —N/a | | | | DNF | – |
| Christopher Linke | 20 kilometres walk | —N/a | | | | 1:27:19 | 4 |
| Hagen Pohle | 20 kilometres walk | —N/a | | | | 1:32:20 | 17 |
| Carl Dohmann | 50 kilometres walk | —N/a | | | | 4:10:22 | 7 |
| Jonathan Hilbert | 50 kilometres walk | —N/a | | | | 4:30:43 | 23 |
| Nathaniel Seiler | 50 kilometres walk | —N/a | | | | DNF | – |

Field events

| Athlete | Event | Qualification | | Final | |
| Athlete | Event | Distance | Position | Distance | Position |
|---|---|---|---|---|---|
| Mateusz Przybylko | High jump | 2.17 | 30 | Did not advance | |
| Torben Blech | Pole vault | 5.45 | 23 | Did not advance | |
| Raphael Holzdeppe | Pole vault | 5.75 | 8 Q | 5.70 | 6 |
| Bo Kanda Lita Baehre | Pole vault | 5.70 | 11 q | 5.70 | 4 |
| Christoph Harting | Discus throw | 63.08 | 14 | Did not advance | |
| Martin Wierig | Discus throw | 63.65 | 11 q | 64.98 | 8 |
| David Wrobel | Discus throw | 62.34 | 16 | Did not advance | |
| Andreas Hofmann | Javelin throw | 80.06 | 20 | Did not advance | |
| Thomas Röhler | Javelin throw | 79.23 | 23 | Did not advance | |
| Johannes Vetter | Javelin throw | 89.35 | 1 Q | 85.37 | 3rd place, bronze medalist(s) |
| Julian Weber | Javelin throw | 84.29 | 7 Q | 81.26 | 6 |

Combined events – Decathlon

| Athlete | Event | 100 m | LJ | SP | HJ | 400 m | 110H | DT | PV | JT | 1500 m | Final | Rank |
|---|---|---|---|---|---|---|---|---|---|---|---|---|---|
| Niklas Kaul | Result | 11.27 | 7.19 | 15.10 | 2.02 | 48.48 SB | 14.64 | 49.20 PB | 5.00 PB | 79.05 CDB | 4:15.70 SB | 8691 PB | 1st place, gold medalist(s) |
| Niklas Kaul | Points | 801 | 859 | 796 | 822 | 886 | 894 | 854 | 910 | 1028 | 841 | 8691 PB | 1st place, gold medalist(s) |
| Kai Kazmirek | Result | 10.82 SB | 7.26 | 14.30 | 2.05 SB | 47.35 | DNF | 44.85 SB | 5.20 PB | 60.08 SB | 4:49.16 | 7414 | 17 |
| Kai Kazmirek | Points | 901 | 876 | 747 | 850 | 941 | 0 | 764 | 972 | 739 | 624 | 7414 | 17 |
| Tim Nowak | Result | 11.12 SB | 7.07 | 14.69 | 2.02 SB | 49.60 SB | 14.60 SB | 45.02 | 4.90 | 56.76 | 4:22.18 | 8122 | 10 |
| Tim Nowak | Points | 834 | 830 | 771 | 822 | 833 | 899 | 767 | 880 | 689 | 797 | 8122 | 10 |

=== Women ===
Track and road events

| Athlete | Event | Heat | | Semifinal | | Final | |
| Athlete | Event | Result | Rank | Result | Rank | Result | Rank |
|---|---|---|---|---|---|---|---|
| Gina Lückenkemper | 100 metres | 11.29 | 20 Q | 11.30 | 20 | Did not advance | |
| Tatjana Pinto | 100 metres | 11.19 | 10 Q | 11.29 | 18 | Did not advance | |
| Tatjana Pinto | 200 metres | 22.63 PB | 8 Q | 23.11 | 18 | Did not advance | |
| Lisa-Marie Kwayie | 200 metres | 22.77 PB | 10 Q | 22.83 | 13 | Did not advance | |
| Jessica-Bianca Wessolly | 200 metres | 23.10 | 22 q | 23.37 | 21 | Did not advance | |
| Christina Hering | 800 metres | 2:03.15 | 19 | Did not advance | | | |
| Katharina Trost | 800 metres | 2:01.45 | 5 Q | 2:01.77 | 17 | Did not advance | |
| Caterina Granz | 1500 metres | 4:12.36 | 31 | Did not advance | | | |
| Hanna Klein | 5000 metres | 15:28.65 | 18 | —N/a | | Did not advance | |
| Konstanze Klosterhalfen | 5000 metres | 15:01.57 | 6 Q | —N/a | | 14:28.43 | 3rd place, bronze medalist(s) |
| Alina Reh | 10,000 metres | —N/a | | | | DNF | – |
| Cindy Roleder | 100 metres hurdles | 12.76 SB | 8 Q | 12.86 | 11 | Did not advance | |
| Carolina Krafzik | 400 metres hurdles | 55.93 | 19 q | 56.41 | 23 | Did not advance | |
| Gesa Felicitas Krause | 3000 metres steeplechase | 9:18.82 | 3 Q | —N/a | | 9:03.30 NR | 3rd place, bronze medalist(s) |
| Lisa-Marie Kwayie; Yasmin Kwadwo; Jessica-Bianca Wessolly; Gina Lückenkemper | 4 × 100 metres relay | 42.82 | 7 q | —N/a | | 42.48 | 5 |
| Saskia Feige | 20 kilometres walk | —N/a | | | | 1:37:14 | 11 |

Field events

| Athlete | Event | Qualification | | Final | |
| Athlete | Event | Distance | Position | Distance | Position |
|---|---|---|---|---|---|
| Christina Honsel | High jump | 1.80 | 27 | Did not advance | |
| Imke Onnen | High jump | 1.94 | 4 Q | 1.89 | 9 |
| Katharina Bauer | Pole vault | NH | – | Did not advance | |
| Lisa Ryzih | Pole vault | 4.60 | 14 Q | 4.50 | 17 |
| Malaika Mihambo | Long jump | 6.98 | 1 Q | 7.30 WL | 1st place, gold medalist(s) |
| Sara Gambetta | Shot put | 18.01 | 13 | Did not advance | |
| Alina Kenzel | Shot put | 17.46 | 20 | Did not advance | |
| Christina Schwanitz | Shot put | 18.52 | 7 Q | 19.17 | 3rd place, bronze medalist(s) |
| Nadine Müller | Discus throw | 62.93 | 8 q | 61.55 | 8 |
| Kristin Pudenz | Discus throw | 63.35 | 6 Q | 57.69 | 11 |
| Claudine Vita | Discus throw | 62.31 | 11 q | 60.77 | 9 |
| Annika-Marie Fuchs | Javelin throw | 58.16 | 21 | Did not advance | |
| Christin Hussong | Javelin throw | 65.29 | 2 Q | 65.21 | 4 |

=== Mixed ===
Track and road events

| Athlete | Event | Heat | | Semifinal | | Final | |
| Athlete | Event | Result | Rank | Result | Rank | Result | Rank |
|---|---|---|---|---|---|---|---|
| Marvin Schlegel; Luna Bulmahn; Karolina Pahlitzsch; Manuel Sanders | 4 × 400 metres relay | 3:17.85 | 14 | —N/a | | Did not advance | |
