= Canada at the 2019 World Athletics Championships =

- WA code: CAN
- National federation: Athletics Canada
- Website: www.athletics.ca

in Doha
- Competitors: 52
- Medals Ranked 23rd: Gold 0 Silver 1 Bronze 4 Total 5

World Athletics Championships appearances (overview)
- 1976; 1980; 1983; 1987; 1991; 1993; 1995; 1997; 1999; 2001; 2003; 2005; 2007; 2009; 2011; 2013; 2015; 2017; 2019; 2022; 2023; 2025

Canada competed at the 2019 World Championships in Athletics in Doha, Qatar, from 27 September–6 October 2019.

== Medallists ==
The following competitors from Canada won medals at the Championships

| Medal | Athlete | Event | Date |
|---|---|---|---|
| Silver | Andre De Grasse | 200 metres | 1 October |
| Bronze | Andre De Grasse | 100 metres | 28 September |
| Bronze | Evan Dunfee | 50 kilometres walk | 28–29 September |
| Bronze | Mohammed Ahmed | 5000 metres | 27–30 September |
| Bronze | Damian Warner | decathlon | 2–4 October |

== Results ==
Key

- Note–Ranks given for track events are within the athlete's heat only
- Q = Qualified for the next round
- q = Qualified for the next round as a fastest loser or, in field events, by position without achieving the qualifying target
- NR = National record
- PB = Personal best
- N/A = Round not applicable for the event
- Bye = Athlete not required to compete in round

=== Men ===
Track and road events

| Athlete | Event | Heat | | Semifinal | | Final | |
| Athlete | Event | Result | Rank | Result | Rank | Result | Rank |
|---|---|---|---|---|---|---|---|
| Aaron Brown | 100 metres | 10.16 | 2 Q | 10.12 | 2 Q | 10.08 | 8 |
| Andre De Grasse | 100 metres | 10.13 | 2 Q | 10.07 | 1 Q | 9.90 PB | 3rd place, bronze medalist(s) |
| Aaron Brown | 200 metres | 20.10 | Q | 20.20 | q | 20.10 | 6 |
| Andre De Grasse | 200 metres | 20.20 | Q | 20.08 | Q | 19.95 | 2nd place, silver medalist(s) |
| Brendon Rodney | 200 metres | 20.38 | Q | 20.34 | 5 | Did not advance | |
| Philip Osei | 400 metres | 45.87 | 24 Q | 45.44 | 19 | Did not advance | |
| Marco Arop | 800 metres | 1:46.12 | 2 Q | 1:45.07 | 2 Q | 1:45.78 | 7 |
| Brandon McBride | 800 metres | 1:45.96 | 1 Q | 1:46.21 | 4 | Did not advance | |
| Mohammed Ahmed | 5000 metres | 13:25.35 | 5 Q | —N/a | | 13:01.11 | 3rd place, bronze medalist(s) |
| Justyn Knight | 5000 metres | 13:25.95 | 9 q | —N/a | | 13:26.63 | 10 |
| Mohammed Ahmed | 10,000 metres | —N/a | | | | 26:59.35 NR | 6 |
| Berhanu Girma | Marathon | —N/a | | | | 2:22:28 | 45 |
| John Mason | Marathon | —N/a | | | | 2:19:21 | 36 |
| Matthew Hughes | 3000 metres steeplechase | 8:13.12 | 4 q | —N/a | | 8:24.78 | 14 |
| Ryan Smeeton | 3000 metres steeplechase | 8:32.53 | 9 | —N/a | | Did not advance | |
| John Gay | 3000 metres steeplechase | 8:33.74 | 11 | —N/a | | Did not advance | |
| Aaron Brown; Andre De Grasse; Brendon Rodney; Gavin Smellie | 4 × 100 m relay | 37.91 | 6 | —N/a | | Did not advance | |
| Austin Cole; Philip Osei; Madeline Price; Aiyanna Stiverne | 4 × 400 m mixed relay | 3:16.76 NR | 5 | —N/a | | Did not advance | |
| Evan Dunfee | 20 kilometres walk | —N/a | | | | Did not start | |
| Evan Dunfee | 50 kilometres walk | —N/a | | | | 4:05:02 | 3rd place, bronze medalist(s) |
| Mathieu Bilodeau | 50 kilometres walk | —N/a | | | | 4:21:13 | 14 |

Field events

| Athlete | Event | Qualification | | Final | |
| Athlete | Event | Distance | Position | Distance | Position |
|---|---|---|---|---|---|
| Michael Mason | High jump | 2.29 | =6 q | 2.30 | 7 |
| Django Lovett | High jump | 2.22 | =22 | Did not advance | |
| Tim Nedow | Shot put | 20.94 | 10 Q | 20.85 | 9 |

Combined events – Decathlon

| Athlete | Event | 100 m | LJ | SP | HJ | 400 m | 110H | DT | PV | JT | 1500 m | Final | Rank |
|---|---|---|---|---|---|---|---|---|---|---|---|---|---|
| Damian Warner | Result | 10.35 | 7.67 | 14.17 | 2.02 | 48.12 | 13.56 | 42.19 | 4.70 | 62.87 | 4:40.77 | 8529 | 3rd place, bronze medalist(s) |
| Damian Warner | Points | 1011 | 977 | 800 | 822 | 903 | 1032 | 709 | 819 | 781 | 675 | 8529 | 3rd place, bronze medalist(s) |
| Pierce Lepage | Result | 10.36 | 7.79 | 13.21 | 2.05 | 47.35 | 14.19 | 41.19 | 5.20 | 57.42 | 4:45.09 | 8445 | 5 |
| Pierce Lepage | Points | 1008 | 1007 | 680 | 850 | 941 | 950 | 689 | 972 | 699 | 649 | 8445 | 5 |

=== Women ===
Track and road events

| Athlete | Event | Heat | | Semifinal | | Final | |
| Athlete | Event | Result | Rank | Result | Rank | Result | Rank |
|---|---|---|---|---|---|---|---|
| Crystal Emmanuel | 100 metres | 11.30 | 5 q | 11.29 | 7 | Did not advance | |
| Crystal Emmanuel | 200 metres | 23.00 | 5 q | 22.65 SB | 3 | Did not advance | |
| Kyra Constantine | 400 metres | DNS | DNS | Did not advance | | | |
| Madeline Price | 400 metres | 52.24 | 5 | Did not advance | | | |
| Aiyanna Stiverne | 400 metres | 52.03 | 5 | Did not advance | | | |
| Lindsey Butterworth | 800 metres | 2:01.64 | 4 q | 2:00.74 | 4 | Did not advance | |
| Gabriela DeBues-Stafford | 1500 metres | 4.07.28 | 2 Q | 4.01.04 | 2 Q | 3.56.12 NR | 6 |
| Rachel Cliff | 5000 metres | 15.41.27 | 10 | —N/a | | Did not advance | |
| Jessica O'Connell | 5000 metres | DNS | DNS | —N/a | | Did not advance | |
| Andrea Seccafien | 5000 metres | 15.04.67 PB | 7 q | —N/a | | 14.59.95 PB | 13 |
| Natasha Wodak | 10,000 metres | —N/a | | | | 32:31.19 | 17 |
| Sasha Gollish | Marathon | —N/a | | | | DNF | DNF |
| Lyndsay Tessier | Marathon | —N/a | | | | 2.42.03 SB | 9 |
| Melanie Myrand | Marathon | —N/a | | | | 2.57.40 | 27 |
| Phylicia George | 100 metres hurdles | 13.49 | 7 | Did not advance | | | |
| Sage Watson | 400 metres hurdles | 55.57 | 2 Q | 54.32 NR | 2 Q | 54.82 | 8 |
| Maria Bernard | 3000 metres steeplechase | 9:57.03 | 14 | —N/a | | Did not advance | |
| Geneviève Lalonde | 3000 metres steeplechase | 9:30.01 | 7 q | —N/a | | 9.32.92 | 14 |
| Regan Yee | 3000 metres steeplechase | 9:48.56 | 11 | —N/a | | Did not advance | |
| | 4 × 100 metres relay | DNS | DNS | —N/a | | Did not advance | |
| Sage Watson; Alicia Brown; Madeline Price; Carline Muir; Maya Stephens; Aiyanna Stiverne; Katherine-Jessica Surin | 4 × 400 metres relay | 3.25.86 SB | 3 Q | —N/a | | DSQ | 163.3 (a) |
| Rachel Seaman | 20 kilometres walk | —N/a | | | | 1.45.40 | 34 |

Field events

| Athlete | Event | Qualification | | Final | |
| Athlete | Event | Distance | Position | Distance | Position |
|---|---|---|---|---|---|
| Kelsie Ahbe | Pole vault | 4.35 | =22 | Did not advance | |
| Alysha Newman | Pole vault | 4.60 | =1 Q | 4.80 | 5 |
| Brittany Crew | Shot put | 18.30 | 11 q | 18.55 | 8 |
| Sarah Mitton | Shot put | 17.24 | 24 | Did not advance | |
| Elizabeth Gleadle | Javelin throw | 60.17 | 16 | Did not advance | |

=== Mixed ===
Track and road events

| Athlete | Event | Heat | | Semifinal | | Final | |
| Athlete | Event | Result | Rank | Result | Rank | Result | Rank |
|---|---|---|---|---|---|---|---|
| Austin Cole; Aiyanna Stiverne; Madeline Price; Philip Osei | 4 × 400 metres relay | 3:16.76 NR | 10 | —N/a | | Did not advance | |

== Sources ==
- Provisional Canadian team named August 20
- Athletics Canada official roster for the games.
