= Kenya at the 2019 World Athletics Championships =

- WA code: KEN
- Website: www.athleticskenya.or.ke

in Doha
- Competitors: 45 in 20 events
- Medals Ranked 2nd: Gold 5 Silver 2 Bronze 4 Total 11

World Athletics Championships appearances (overview)
- 1983; 1987; 1991; 1993; 1995; 1997; 1999; 2001; 2003; 2005; 2007; 2009; 2011; 2013; 2015; 2017; 2019; 2022; 2023; 2025

Kenya competed at the 2019 World Championships in Athletics in Doha, Qatar, from 27 September to 6 October 2019. The country finished in 2nd place in the medal table.

== Medalists ==
Medal	Athlete	Event	Date
Gold	Ruth Chepngetich	Women's marathon	September 27
Gold	Beatrice Chepkoech	Women's Steeplechase	September 30
Gold	Conseslus Kipruto	Men's steeplechase	October 4
Gold	Hellen Obiri	Women's 5000 metres	October 5
Gold	Timothy Cheruiyot	Men's 1500 metres	October 6
Silver	Margaret Chelimo Kipkemboi	Women's 5000 metres	October 5
Silver	Faith Kipyegon	Women's 1500 metres	October 5
Bronze	Agnes Tirop	Women's 10,000 metres	September 28
Bronze	Ferguson Cheruiyot Rotich	Men's 800 metres	October 1
Bronze	Amos Kipruto	Men's marathon	October 5
Bronze	Rhonex Kipruto	Men's 10,000 metres	October 6

== Results ==
(q – qualified, NM – no mark, SB – season best)

=== Men ===
Track and road events

Athlete	Event	Preliminaries		Heat		Semifinal		Final	
Athlete	Event	Result	Rank	Result	Rank	Result	Rank	Result	Rank
Emmanuel Korir	400 metres	—		45.08	4 Q	44.37	4 Q	44.94	6
Alphas Kishoyian	400 metres	—		45.65	17 q	45.55	21	Did not advance	
Emmanuel Korir	800 metres	—		1:45.16	1 Q	1:45.19	8	Did not advance	
Ferguson Cheruiyot Rotich	800 metres	—		1:45.98	10 Q	1:44.20	2 Q	1:43.82	3rd place, bronze medalist(s)
Ngeno Kipngetich	800 metres	—		1:46.07	13 Q	1:43.82	20	Did not advance	
Timothy Cheruiyot	1500 metres	—		3:36.82	9 Q	3:36.53	2 Q	3:29.26	1st place, gold medalist(s)
Kumari Taki	1500 metres	—		3:37.98	26	Did not advance			
Ronald Kwemoi	1500 metres	—		3:36.66	7 q	3:36.53	3 Q	3:32.72	7 SB
George Manangoi	1500 metres	—		3:38.39	28	Did not advance			
Abraham Kipchirchir Rotich	1500 metres	—		3:45.19	39	Did not advance			
Nicholas Kimeli	5000 metres	—		13:20.82 Q	5	—		13:05.27	8
Jacob Krop	5000 metres	—		13:24.94 Q	10	—		13:03.08	6 PB
Rodgers Kwemoi	10,000 metres	—						26:55.36 PB	4
Rhonex Kipruto	10,000 metres	—						26:50.32	3rd place, bronze medalist(s)
Alex Korio	10,000 metres	—						27:28.74 PB	11
Amos Kipruto	Marathon	—						2:10:51	3rd place, bronze medalist(s)
Geoffrey Kirui	Marathon	—						2:13:54 SB	14
Laban Korir	Marathon	—						2:12:38	11
Leonard Kipkemoi Bett	3000 metres steeplechase	—		8:13.07	3 Q	—		8:10.64	9
Abraham Kibiwott	3000 metres steeplechase	—		8:18.46	8 Q	—		8:08.52	7
Benjamin Kigen	3000 metres steeplechase	—		8:19.44	12 Q	—		8:06.95	6
Conseslus Kipruto	3000 metres steeplechase	—		8:19.20	11 Q	—		8:01.35 WL	1st place, gold medalist(s)
Samuel Gathimba	20 kilometres walk	—						1:40:45	33

Field events

Athlete	Event	Qualification		Final	
Athlete	Event	Distance	Position	Distance	Position
Julius Yego	Javelin throw	83.86	8 q	NM	—

=== Women ===
Track and road events

Athlete	Event	Heat		Semifinal		Final	
Athlete	Event	Result	Rank	Result	Rank	Result	Rank
Mary Moraa	400 metres	51.85	22 Q	52.11	18	Did not advance	
Hellen Syombua	400 metres	57.07	45	Did not advance			
Eunice Jepkoech Sum	800 metres	2:02.17	13 q	2:00.10	4 Q	1:59:71	5
Winny Chebet	1500 metres	4:08.36	20 Q	4:01.14	5 Q	3:58.20 PB	7
Faith Chepngetich Kipyegon	1500 metres	4:03.93	2 Q	4:14.98	15 Q	3:54.22 NR	2nd place, silver medalist(s)
Hellen Obiri	5000 metres	14:52.13	1 Q	—		14:26.72 CR	1st place, gold medalist(s)
Margaret Chelimo Kipkemboi	5000 metres	15:01.58	7 Q	—		14:27.49 PB	2nd place, silver medalist(s)
Lilian Kasait Rengeruk	5000 metres	15:02.03	8 Q	—		14:36.05 PB	5
Rosemary Wanjiru	10,000 metres	—				30:35.75 PB	4
Hellen Obiri	10,000 metres	—				30:35.82 PB	5
Agnes Jebet Tirop	10,000 metres	—				30:25.20 PB	3rd place, bronze medalist(s)
Ruth Chepngetich	Marathon	—				2:32:43	1st place, gold medalist(s)
Edna Ngeringwony Kiplagat	Marathon	—				2:35:36 SB	4
Visiline Jepkesho	Marathon	—				2:46:38	15
Beatrice Chepkoech	3000 metres steeplechase	9:18.01	1 Q	—		8:57.84 CR	1st place, gold medalist(s)
Celliphine Chepteek Chespol	3000 metres steeplechase	9:24.22	7 Q	—		DNF	—
Hyvin Jepkemoi	3000 metres steeplechase	9:29.15	12 Q	—		9:13.53	8
Fancy Cherono	3000 metres steeplechase	9:32.34	18	—		Did not advance	

=== Mixed ===
Track and road events

Athlete	Event	Heat		Semifinal		Final	
Athlete	Event	Result	Rank	Result	Rank	Result	Rank
Alphas Kishoyian; Gladys Musyoki; Mary Moraa; Alex Sampao	4 × 400 metres relay	3:17.09	11	—		Did not advance	
