= 2019 World Athletics Championships – Women's 3000 metres steeplechase =

Women's 3000 metres steeplechase at the 2019 World Championships
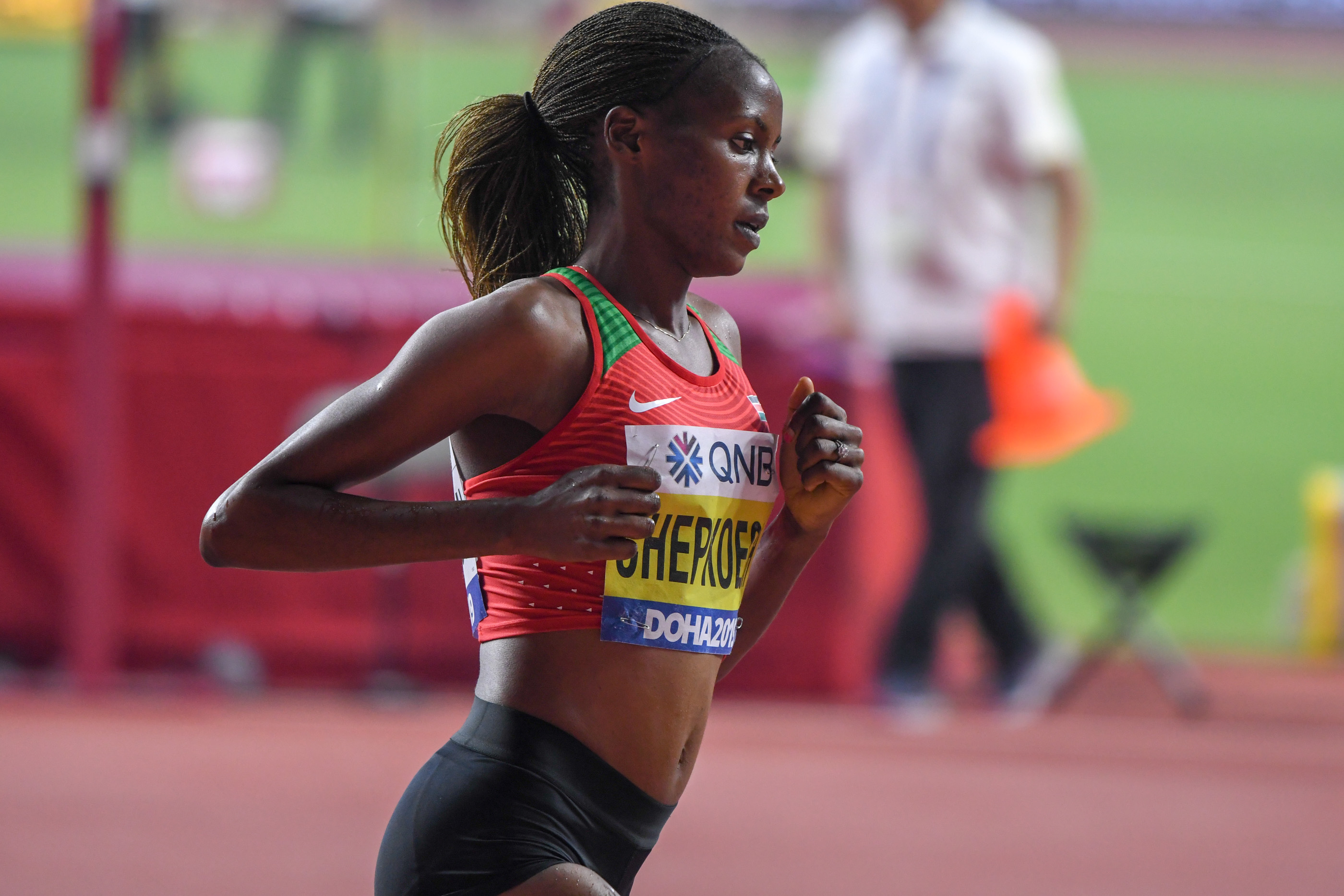
- Beatrice Chepkoech competing in the final.
- Venue: Khalifa International Stadium
- Dates: 27 September (heats); 30 September (final)
- Competitors: 42 from 26 nations
- Winning time: 8:57.84

Medalists
gold medal	Beatrice Chepkoech	Kenya
silver medal	Emma Coburn	United States
bronze medal	Gesa Felicitas Krause	Germany

Video on YouTube Official Video

The women's 3000 metres steeplechase at the 2019 World Athletics Championships was held at the Khalifa International Stadium in Doha, Qatar, from 27 to 30 September 2019.

== Summary ==
World record holder Beatrice Chepkoech captured her first world title with a dominant performance in the women's 3000 metres steeplechase at the World Championships in Doha. The 28-year-old Kenyan led the race from start to finish crossing the line in 8 minutes 57.84 seconds setting a championship record. At one point she led the field by 60 metres before defending champion Emma Coburn attempted to reign her in. The American, Coburn, captured the silver medal running a personal best of 9:03.35 finishing four and one-half seconds behind Chepkoech. Germany's Gesa Felicitas Krause ran 9:03.30 to take the bronze medal for the second time at a world championship event and also set a new national record. Bahrain's Winifred Yavi just missed the medal podium running a personal best of 9:05.68 to finish fourth.

Two other national records were established during the race; Denmark's Anna Emilie Møller finished seventh with a time of 9:13.46 and Albania's Luiza Gega ran 9:19.93 to finished ninth.

== Race Details ==
When the gun sounded to start the final, Kenya's Beatrice Chepkoech wasted no time stepping off to the lead and quickly establishing an expanding gap between herself and the field; 15 metres by the first barrier, 20 metres in the first lap. This caused a seven-woman pack to form led by Bahrain's Winfred Yavi with top challengers Hyvin Kiyeng, defending champion Emma Coburn, and Peruth Chemutai tucked in behind Yavi. The pack was running at a brisk pace, too, but after one kilometre found themselves seven seconds behind Chepkoech.

Chepkoech covered the first kilometre in 2:52.95. She ran her second kilometre in 3:02.34 for a 2,000 metres time of 5:55.28.

At the 6:34 mark Chepkoech opened up a 60-metre lead over the field. Thirty seconds later, at the 7:04 mark, the American Coburn would make a bold move to separate herself from the pack and chase down the leader. The defending champion ran her final kilometre in 2:57 cutting Chepkoech lead by one-half, but it was too great a distance to overcome finishing four and one-half seconds behind the leader.

Chepkoech ran the final kilometer in 3:02.56 to finish at 8:57.84, capturing gold and establishing a championship record.

Fresh off her 2000 metres steeplechase world record a month earlier, Gesa Felicitas Krause ran a spectacular final lap passing two runners, Kiyeng and Yavi, to pick up the bronze medal.

Coburn improved her standing to #8 of all time fastest women's steeplechase list. Krause set her German national record and moved to #9 on the list; Yavi moved up to #11. Anna Emilie Møller set a Danish national record in her preliminary heat and then improved upon it in the final. Finally, Luiza Gega set an Albanian national record.

Of note, at the 6:26 mark and then in fifth place, Kenya's Celliphine Chespol withdrew from the race; she crossed over a water jump and appeared to have injured herself.

== Records ==
Before the competition records were as follows:

Record	Perf.	Athlete	Nat.	Date	Location
World record	8:44.32	Beatrice Chepkoech	KEN	20 Jul 2018	Monaco
Championship	9:02.58	Emma Coburn	USA	11 Aug 2017	London, Great Britain
World leading	8:55.58	Beatrice Chepkoech	KEN	30 Jun 2019	Palo Alto, California, US
African	8:44.32	Beatrice Chepkoech	KEN	20 Jul 2018	Monaco
Asian	8:52.78	Ruth Jebet	BHR	27 Aug 2016	Saint-Denis, France
NACAC	9:00.85	Courtney Frerichs	USA	20 Jul 2018	Monaco
South American	9:25.99	Belén Casetta	ARG	11 Aug 2017	London, Great Britain
European	8:58.81	Gulnara Samitova-Galkina	RUS	17 Aug 2008	Beijing, China
Oceanian	9:14.28	Genevieve Lacaze	AUS	27 Aug 2016	Saint-Denis, France

== Schedule ==
The event schedule, in local time (UTC+3), was as follows:

Date	Time	Round
27 September	18:55	Heats
30 September	21:50	Final

== Results ==
=== Heats ===
Qualification: First 3 in each heat (Q) and the next 6 fastest (q) advanced to the final.

Rank	Heat	Name	Nationality	Time	Notes
1	2	Beatrice Chepkoech	Kenya	9:18.01	Q
2	2	Courtney Frerichs	United States	9:18.42	Q
3	2	Gesa Felicitas Krause	Germany	9:18.82	Q
4	2	Anna Emilie Møller	Denmark	9:18.92	q, NR
5	1	Peruth Chemutai	Uganda	9:21.98	Q
6	1	Emma Coburn	United States	9:23.40	Q
7	1	Celliphine Chepteek Chespol	Kenya	9:24.22	Q
8	1	Mekides Abebe	Ethiopia	9:27.61	q, PB
9	1	Genevieve Gregson	Australia	9:27.74	q, SB
10	2	Luiza Gega	Albania	9:28.32	q
11	1	Karoline Bjerkeli Grøvdal	Norway	9:28.84	q
12	3	Hyvin Kiyeng	Kenya	9:29.15	Q
13	3	Winfred Mutile Yavi	Bahrain	9:29.40	Q
14	3	Maruša Mišmaš	Slovenia	9:29.68	Q
15	1	Geneviève Lalonde	Canada	9:30.01	q
16	2	Elizabeth Bird	Great Britain & N.I.	9:30.13	PB
17	2	Allie Ostrander	United States	9:30.85	PB
18	3	Fancy Cherono	Kenya	9:32.34	
19	3	Yekaterina Ivonina	Authorised Neutral Athletes	9:35.59	SB
20	3	Irene Sánchez-Escribano	Spain	9:37.34	
21	1	Aimee Pratt	Great Britain & N.I.	9:38.91	PB
22	3	Zerfe Wondemagegn	Ethiopia	9:40.92	
23	1	Xu Shuangshuang	China	9:42.23	
24	1	Adva Cohen	Israel	9:42.92	
25	3	Zhang Xinyan	China	9:43.75	
26	1	Anna Tropina	Authorised Neutral Athletes	9:44.06	
27	2	Paige Campbell	Australia	9:44.80	PB
28	1	Alicja Konieczek	Poland	9:44.96	
29	3	Belén Casetta	Argentina	9:45.07	
30	2	Michelle Finn	Ireland	9:47.44	
31	3	Marwa Bouzayani	Tunisia	9:47.78	
32	1	Özlem Kaya	Turkey	9:48.08	
33	3	Regan Yee	Canada	9:48.56	
34	3	Rosie Clarke	Great Britain & N.I.	9:49.18	
35	2	Lomi Muleta	Ethiopia	9:49.28	
36	3	Georgia Winkcup	Australia	9:50.21	
37	2	Viktória Wagner-Gyürkés	Hungary	9:52.11	
38	2	Camilla Richardsson	Finland	9:53.06	
39	2	Reimi Yoshimura	Japan	9:55.72	
40	2	Maria Bernard-Galea	Canada	9:57.03	
41	1	Ophélie Claude-Boxberger	France	10:05.10	
42	2	Tuğba Güvenç	Turkey	10:13.79	
	3	Colleen Quigley	United States	DNS	

=== Final ===
The final was started on 30 September at 21:50.

Rank	Name	Nationality	Time	Notes
1st place, gold medalist(s)	Beatrice Chepkoech	Kenya	8:57.84	CR
2nd place, silver medalist(s)	Emma Coburn	United States	9:02.35	PB
3rd place, bronze medalist(s)	Gesa Felicitas Krause	Germany	9:03.30	NR
4	Winfred Mutile Yavi	Bahrain	9:05.68	PB
5	Peruth Chemutai	Uganda	9:11.08	SB
6	Courtney Frerichs	United States	9:11.27	
7	Anna Emilie Møller	Denmark	9:13.46	NR
8	Hyvin Kiyeng	Kenya	9:13.53	
9	Luiza Gega	Albania	9:19.93	NR
10	Genevieve Gregson	Australia	9:23.84	SB
11	Mekides Abebe	Ethiopia	9:25.66	SB
12	Maruša Mišmaš	Slovenia	9:25.80	
13	Karoline Bjerkeli Grøvdal	Norway	9:29.41	
14	Geneviève Lalonde	Canada	9:32.92	
	Celliphine Chepteek Chespol	Kenya	DNF	
