= Ethiopia at the 2019 World Athletics Championships =

Ethiopia at the 2019 World Championships in Athletics
- WA code: ETH

in Doha, Qatar
- Medals Ranked 5th: Gold 2 Silver 5 Bronze 1 Total 8

World Championships in Athletics appearances
- 1983; 1987; 1991; 1993; 1995; 1997; 1999; 2001; 2003; 2005; 2007; 2009; 2011; 2013; 2015; 2017; 2019; 2022; 2023

Ethiopia competed at the 2019 World Championships in Athletics in Doha, Qatar from 27 September to 6 October 2019. The country finished in 5th place in the medal table.

== Medalists ==
Medal	Athlete	Event	Date
Gold	Muktar Edris	Men's 5000 metres	September 30
Gold	Lelisa Desisa	Men's marathon	October 5
Silver	Selemon Barega	Men's 5000 metres	September 30
Silver	Yomif Kejelcha	Men's 10,000 metres	October 6
Silver	Mosinet Geremew	Men's marathon	October 5
Silver	Lamecha Girma	Men's 3000 metres steeplechase	October 4
Silver	Letesenbet Gidey	Women's 10,000 metres	September 28
Bronze	Gudaf Tsegay	Women's 1500 metres	October 5

== Results ==
(q – qualified, NM – no mark, SB – season best)

=== Men ===
Track and road events

Athlete	Event	Heat		Semi-final		Final	
Athlete	Event	Result	Rank	Result	Rank	Result	Rank
Teddese Lemi	1500 metres	3:41.32	36 q	3:38.79 PB	23	Did not advance	
Samuel Tefera	1500 metres	3:37.82	22 q	Did not finish		Did not advance	
Selemon Barega	5000 metres	13:24.69	9 Q	—		12:59.70	2nd place, silver medalist(s)
Telahun Haile Bekele	5000 metres	13:20.45	2 Q	—		13:02.29	4
Muktar Edris	5000 metres	13:25.00 SB	11 Q	—		12:58.85 SB	1st place, gold medalist(s)
Abadi Hadis	5000 metres	13:42.89	27	—		Did not advance	
Andamlak Belihu	10,000 metres	—				26:56.71	5
Hagos Gebrhiwet	10,000 metres	—				27:11.37	9
Yomif Kejelcha	10,000 metres	—				26:49.34 PB	2nd place, silver medalist(s)
Lelisa Desisa	Marathon	—				2:10:40 SB	1st place, gold medalist(s)
Mosinet Geremew	Marathon	—				2:10:44	2nd place, silver medalist(s)
Mule Wasihun	Marathon	—				Did not finish	
Chala Beyo	3000 metres steeplechase	8:21.09	14 q	—		Did not finish	
Lamecha Girma	3000 metres steeplechase	8:16.64	6 Q	—		8:01.36 NR	2nd place, silver medalist(s)
Takele Nigate	3000 metres steeplechase	8:38.34	38	—		Did not advance	
Getnet Wale	3000 metres steeplechase	8:12.96	1 Q	—		8:05.21 PB	4

=== Women ===
Track and road events

Athlete	Event	Heat		Semi-final		Final	
Athlete	Event	Result	Rank	Result	Rank	Result	Rank
Diribe Welteji	800 metres	2:02.71	17 q	2:02.69	18	Did not advance	
Axumawit Embaye	1500 metres	4:08.56	23	Did not advance			
Lemlem Hailu	1500 metres	4:05.61	7 q	4:16.56	18	Did not advance	
Gudaf Tsegay	1500 metres	4:08.39	21 Q	4:01.12	4 Q	3:54.38 PB	3rd place, bronze medalist(s)
Hawi Feysa	5000 metres	14:53.85	3 Q	—		14:44.92	8
Tsehay Gemechu	5000 metres	15:01.57	5 Q	—		14:29.60 PB	4
Fantu Worku	5000 metres	15:02.74	11 q	—		14:40.47 PB	6
Letesenbet Gidey	10,000 metres	—				30:21.23 PB	2nd place, silver medalist(s)
Netsanet Gudeta	10,000 metres	—				Did not finish	
Senbere Teferi	10,000 metres	—				30:44.23 SB	6
Ruti Aga	Marathon	—				Did not finish	
Shure Demise	Marathon	—				Did not finish	
Roza Dereje	Marathon	—				Did not finish	
Mekides Abebe	3000 metres steeplechase	9:27.61 PB	8 q	—		9:25.66 PB	11
Lomi Muleta	3000 metres steeplechase	9:49.28	35	—		Did not advance	
Zerfe Wondemagegn	3000 metres steeplechase	9:40.92	22	—		Did not advance	
Yehualeye Beletew	20 km walk	—				1:38:11	16
