= 2019 World Athletics Championships – Men's 10,000 metres =

Men's 10,000 metres at the 2019 World Championships
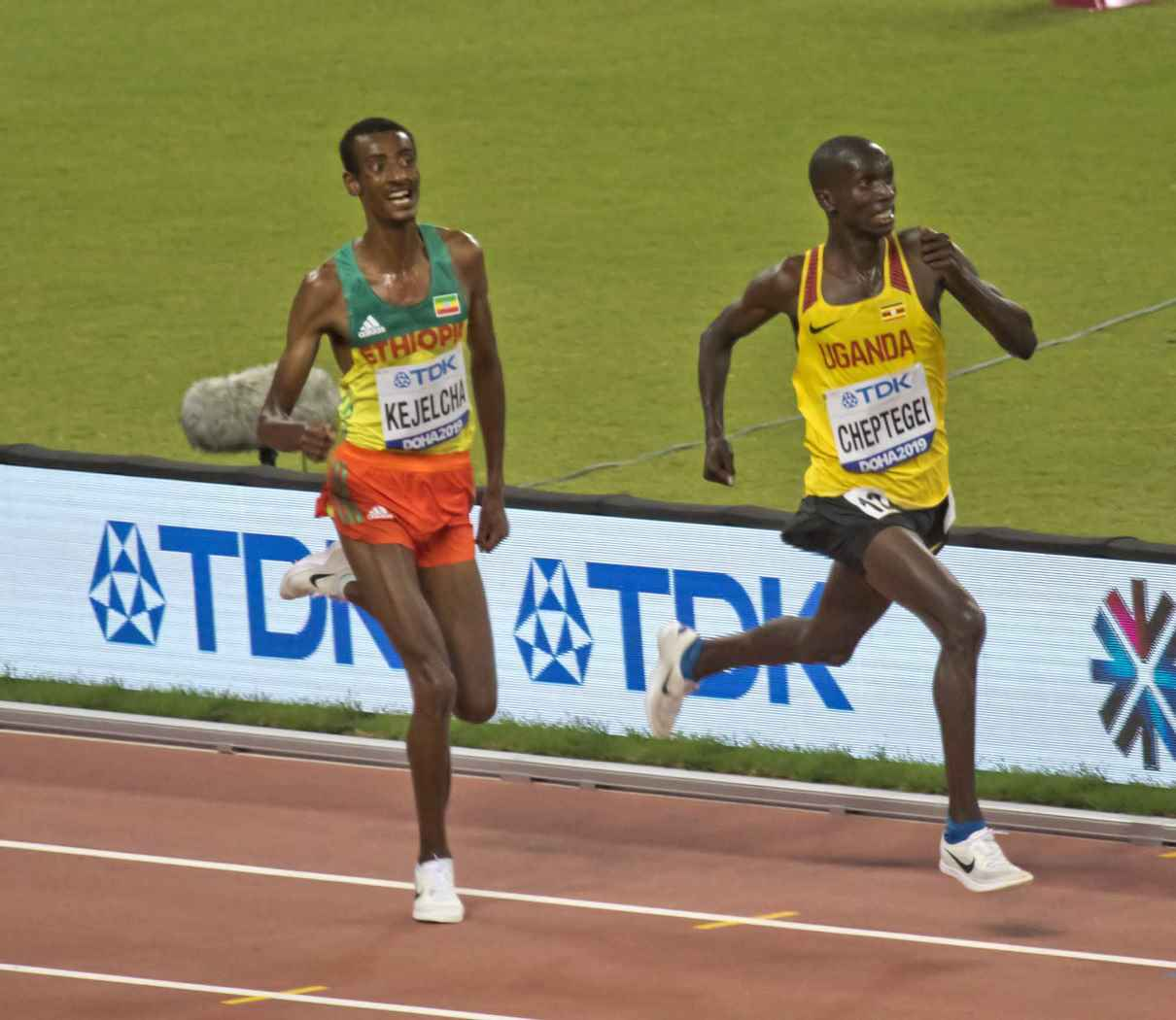
- Joshua Cheptegei and Yomif Kejelcha at the end of the race
- Venue: Khalifa International Stadium
- Dates: 6 October
- Competitors: 21 from 12 nations
- Winning time: 26:48.36

Medalists
gold medal	Joshua Cheptegei	Uganda
silver medal	Yomif Kejelcha	Ethiopia
bronze medal	Andamlak Belihu	Ethiopia

Video on YouTube Official Video

The men's 10,000 metres at the 2019 World Athletics Championships was held at the Khalifa International Stadium in Doha on 6 October 2019.

== Summary ==
Seventeen of the twenty-one starters were born in Eastern Africa, a familiar situation for long distance events. Here the Kenyan team of Rhonex Kipruto and Rodgers Kwemoi took to the front to keep the pace fast and returning silver medalist Joshua Cheptegei, who was a favorite after the track retirement of Mo Farah, was also near the front. By the 5,000 metre mark at 13:33.20 (27:07 pace), only 10 had fallen off the back. Nine laps later, Cheptegei took over the front and two more fell off the back, though Hagos Gebrhiwet, Yemaneberhan Crippa and Lopez Lomong were barely hanging on to the fast-pace. Behind Cheptegei, the 19 year old Kipruto and the tall figure of the new indoor mile record holder Yomif Kejelcha looking like he was waiting to unleash that shorter distance speed. After Mohammed Ahmed fell off the back with 500 meters to go, the group was still five, single file, with Cheptegei still leading the race. Running through traffic at the bell, Kwemoi and Andamlak Belihu couldn't keep up and it looked like the medalsts were decided. Down the final backstretch, Kejelcha moved right onto Cheptegei's shoulder then into a slight lead. The gap left Kipruto running for bronze. As they entered the final turn Cheptegei kept Kejelcha on his outside, while he ran the shorter distance along the inside. Coming off the turn, Cheptegei had the speed, separating slightly from Kejelcha, growing to a 5 metre lead by the finish and claiming gold.

In 2024, both Kipruto and Kwemoi's results regarding the 2019 World Athletics Championships were disqualified, resulting in Andamlak Belihu receiving the bronze medal.

== Records ==
Before the competition records were as follows:

World record	Kenenisa Bekele (ETH)	26:17.53	Brussels, Belgium	26 August 2005
Championship record	Kenenisa Bekele (ETH)	26:46.31	Berlin, Germany	17 August 2009
World Leading	Hagos Gebrhiwet (ETH)	26:48.95	Hengelo, Netherlands	17 July 2019
African Record	Kenenisa Bekele (ETH)	26:17.53	Brussels, Belgium	26 August 2005
Asian Record	Ahmad Hassan Abdullah (QAT)	26:38.76	Brussels, Belgium	5 September 2003
North, Central American and Caribbean record	Galen Rupp (USA)	26:44.36	Eugene, United States	30 May 2014
South American Record	Marilson Gomes dos Santos (BRA)	27:28.12	Neerpelt, Belgium	2 June 2007
European Record	Mo Farah (GBR)	26:46.57	Eugene, United States	3 June 2011
Oceanian record	Ben St. Lawrence (AUS)	27:24.95	Palo Alto, United States	1 May 2011

The following records were set at the competition:

Record	Perf.	Athlete	Nat.	Date
World leading	26:48.36	Joshua Cheptegei	UGA	6 Oct 2019
Canadian	26:59.35	Mohammed Ahmed	CAN	6 Oct 2019
Italian	27:10.76	Yemaneberhan Crippa	ITA	6 Oct 2019

== Qualification standard ==
The standard to qualify automatically for entry was 27:40.00.

Only 18 qualifiers did it in the period: Onesphore Nzikwinkunda (BDI) 28:11.90, Rodrigue Kwizéra (BDI), and Thierry Ndikumwenayo (BDI), were qualified during Cross Country Championships (top finishing position at designated competitions – automatically qualifies, irrespective of whether his performance has reached the Entry Standard). Soufiane Bouchikhi and Yeman Crippa were invited to complete the event for Ranking.

== Schedule ==
The event schedule, in local time (UTC+3), was as follows:

Date	Time	Round
6 October	20:00	Final

== Results ==
The race started on 6 October at 20:04.

Rank	Name	Nationality	Time	Notes
1st place, gold medalist(s)	Joshua Cheptegei	Uganda	26:48.36	WL
2nd place, silver medalist(s)	Yomif Kejelcha	Ethiopia	26:49.34	PB
3rd place, bronze medalist(s)	Andamlak Belihu	Ethiopia	26:56.71	
4	Mohammed Ahmed	Canada	26:59.35	NR
5	Lopez Lomong	United States	27:04.72	PB
6	Yemaneberhan Crippa	Italy	27:10.76	NR
7	Hagos Gebrhiwet	Ethiopia	27:11.37	
8	Shadrack Kipchirchir	United States	27:24.74	SB
9	Sondre Nordstad Moen	Norway	28:02.18	
10	Leonard Korir	United States	28:05.73	
11	Soufiane Bouchikhi	Belgium	28:15.43	
12	Aron Kifle	Eritrea	28:16.74	
13	Rodrigue Kwizera	Burundi	28:21.92	PB
14	Abdallah Kibet Mande	Uganda	28:31.49	
15	Onesphore Nzikwinkunda	Burundi	29:11.50	
	Hassan Chani	Bahrain	DNF	
	Thierry Ndikumwenayo	Burundi	DNF	
	Julien Wanders	Switzerland	DNF	
	Rodgers Kwemoi	Kenya	DSQ	
	Rhonex Kipruto	Kenya	DSQ	
	Alex Korio	Kenya	DSQ	
