= 2019 World Athletics Championships – Men's 5000 metres =

Men's 5000 metres at the 2019 World Championships
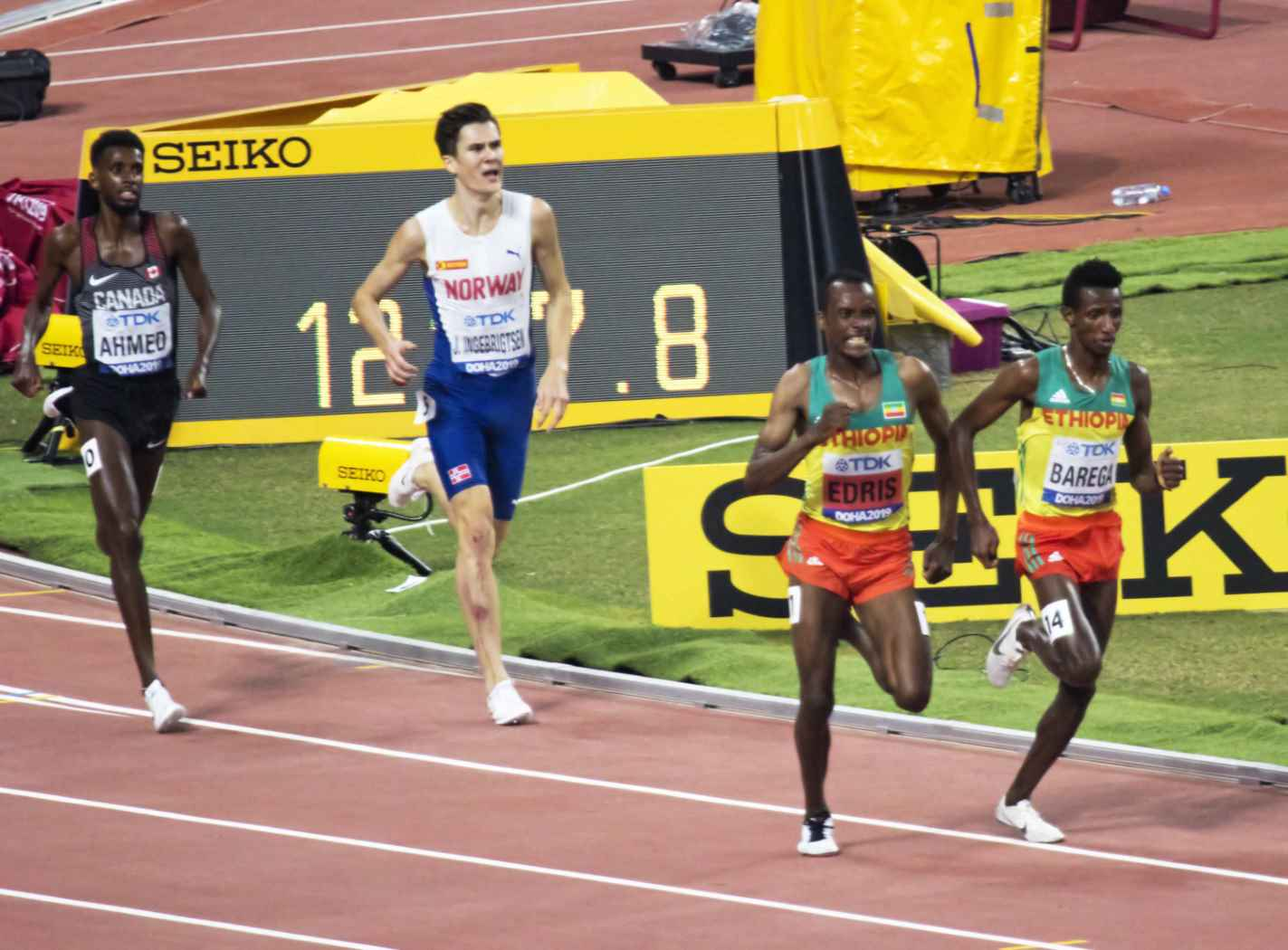
- 5000m men final
- Venue: Khalifa International Stadium
- Dates: 27 September (heats); 30 September (final)
- Competitors: 39 from 21 nations
- Winning time: 12:58.85

Medalists
gold medal	Muktar Edris	Ethiopia
silver medal	Selemon Barega	Ethiopia
bronze medal	Mohammed Ahmed	Canada

Video on YouTube Official Video

The men's 5000 metres at the 2019 World Athletics Championships was held at the Khalifa International Stadium in Doha from 27 to 30 September 2019.

== Summary ==
The semi-final heats were held on Friday, in which all three Ethiopian athletes qualified for the final. All three Norwegian athletes also qualified, after European Champion Jakob Ingebrigtsen successfully appealed a disqualification for stepping past the curb of the track during his heat. In the first heat, Aruba's Jonathan Busby was struggling to finish the distance. Braima Suncar Dabó of Guinea-Bissau, who had already finished the race, returned to help his fellow competitor over the finish line, winning applause from the crowd and a nomination for the International Fair Play Award.

During the final, the Ethiopians employed effective team tactics by taking early control of the race, setting a strong pace, and switching leaders once every two laps. Defending Champion Muktar Edris darted out to the front, with his teammates Selemon Barega and Telahun Haile Bekele following closely. Olympic silver medalist Paul Chelimo and his teammate Hassan Mead of the U.S. stayed close as well, along with Canadian-record holder Mohammed Ahmed, Kenyans Jacob Krop and Nicholas Kimeli, and Bahraini athlete Birhanu Balew. Initially, the Ingebrigtsen brothers stayed towards the rear of the leading group, and even briefly lost contact with the front - presumably to conserve energy until the swift early pace had settled down.

The Ethiopian team aggressively defended their lead throughout the first 4000m of the race and switched leaders once every 800 meters like clockwork. Edris took the lead for the first two laps, running the first lap in a quick 61.5 seconds, and a slower second lap of 65.9 seconds. At 800 meters, his teammate Bekele took over the lead and increased the pace. At 1600m, Barega went to the front and continued pushing the fast pace that his teammates had set. After 2400m, Bekele took the lead again. The pace began to decrease slightly, despite that it was still quick enough for Bekele to bring the pack through 3 kilometers in 7:53.0. This allowed the Ingebrigtsen brothers to catch up to the leading group and start moving up through the pack. Chelimo (and briefly, Filip Ingebrigtsen) led for less than one lap, before Barega recaptured the lead around 3400m. The fast pace was continuing to slightly decrease as Barega led the pack for one more lap. With three laps to go, and as the pace slowed, Ahmed moved to the front and tried make a long run for the finish line.

The final kilometer of the race was extremely hectic. The athletes were positioned far too close to each other, considering how quickly and aggressively they were running. For the next two laps, the athletes consistently bumped into one another, clipped each other's heels, and lost their balance - with some competitors pushing and almost falling over each other. Between 1000 and 600 meters remaining, Ahmed attempted to escape the chaos by injecting a brutal 59.9 second lap. The other athletes, however, were unrelenting and stuck to Ahmed like glue. Ahmed visibly threw his arms up in frustration after the other athletes continued to clip his heels and prevent him from running the inside line despite his vicious sub-60 lap. Heavily affected by the fast pace and physical contact with other athletes, Filip Ingebrigtsen dropped out with 550m remaining, which left Jakob Ingebrigtsenas the remaining Ingebrigtsen sibling in contention for a medal. As he chased Ahmed on the penultimate straightaway, he clipped Ahmed's heels once more, causing him to almost trip and fall.

On the final lap, Jakob Ingebrigtsen made an early, aggressive move to the front. Chelimo attempted to stay with him. Ahmed, Barega, and Edris were all wise to this error, and did not challenge Ingebrigtsen as aggressively as Chelimo did. Barega and Edris passed Ahmed as they began winding up their pace in preparation for their final attack. As Ingebrigtsen and Chelimo began running out of steam off of the final bend, Barega passed them first, with Edris coming wide on the outside. Edris sprinted past Barega to defend his title, with a final lap of 55 seconds. Ahmed and Bekele passed Ingebrigtsen and Chelimo for the third and fourth place, respectively. Evidently suffering from his early move, Jakob Ingebrigtsen was slowing rapidly, and dove at the finish line for a very close fifth place. He then laid on the track, visibly exhausted.

== Records ==
Before the competition records were as follows:

World record	Kenenisa Bekele (ETH)	12:37.35	Hengelo, Netherlands	31 May 2004
Championship record	Eliud Kipchoge (KEN)	12:52.79	Saint-Denis, France	31 August 2003
World Leading	Telahun Bekele (ETH)	12:52.98	Rome, Italy	6 June 2019
African Record	Kenenisa Bekele (ETH)	12:37.35	Hengelo, Netherlands	31 May 2004
Asian Record	Albert Rop (BHR)	12:51.96	Monaco	19 July 2013
North, Central American and Caribbean record	Bernard Lagat (USA)	12:53.60	Monaco	22 July 2011
South American Record	Marilson Gomes dos Santos (BRA)	13:19.43	Kassel, Germany	8 June 2006
European Record	Mohammed Mourhit (BEL)	12:49.71	Brussels, Belgium	25 August 2000
Oceanian record	Craig Mottram (AUS)	12:55.76	London, Great Britain	30 July 2004

== Qualification standard ==
The standard to qualify automatically for entry was 13:22.50.

== Schedule ==
The event schedule, in local time (UTC+3), was as follows:

Date	Time	Round
27 September	19:45	Heats
30 September	21:20	Final

== Results ==
=== Heats ===
Qualification: First 5 in each heat (Q) and the next 5 fastest (q) advanced to the final.

Rank	Heat	Name	Nationality	Time	Notes
1	2	Paul Chelimo	United States	13:20.18	Q
2	2	Telahun Haile Bekele	Ethiopia	13:20.45	Q
3	2	Filip Ingebrigtsen	Norway	13:20.52	Q
4	2	Stewart McSweyn	Australia	13:20.58	Q
5	2	Nicholas Kimeli	Kenya	13:20.82	Q
6	2	Isaac Kimeli	Belgium	13:20.99	q
7	2	Henrik Ingebrigtsen	Norway	13:21.22	q
8	2	Hassan Mead	United States	13:22.11	q, SB
9	1	Selemon Barega	Ethiopia	13:24.69	Q
10	1	Jacob Krop	Kenya	13:24.94	Q
11	1	Muktar Edris	Ethiopia	13:25.00	Q, SB
12	1	Jakob Ingebrigtsen	Norway	13:25.20	Q
13	1	Mohammed Ahmed	Canada	13:25.35	Q
14	1	Birhanu Balew	Bahrain	13:25.70	q
15	2	Justyn Knight	Canada	13:25.95	q
16	1	Andrew Butchart	Great Britain & N.I.	13:26.46	
17	1	Morgan McDonald	Australia	13:26.80	
18	2	Stephen Kissa	Uganda	13:27.36	
19	1	Ben True	United States	13:27.39	
20	1	Patrick Tiernan	Australia	13:28.42	
21	1	Yemaneberhan Crippa	Italy	13:29.08	
22	2	Bouh Ibrahim	Djibouti	13:36.39	
23	2	Ben Connor	Great Britain & N.I.	13:36.92	
24	2	Sam Parsons	Germany	13:38.53	
25	1	Julien Wanders	Switzerland	13:38.95	
26	1	Robin Hendrix	Belgium	13:39.69	
27	2	Abadi Hadis	Ethiopia	13:42.89	
28	1	Oscar Chelimo	Uganda	13:42.94	
29	1	Marc Scott	Great Britain & N.I.	13:47.12	
30	1	Richard Ringer	Germany	13:49.20	
31	2	Soufiyan Bouqantar	Morocco	14:03.16	
32	1	Jamal Abdelmaji Eisa Mohammed	Athlete Refugee Team	14:15.32	
33	1	Tariq Ahmed Al-Amri	Saudi Arabia	14:21.19	
34	2	Tachlowini Gabriyesos	Athlete Refugee Team	14:28.11	
35	1	Braima Suncar Dabó	Guinea-Bissau	18:10.87	
	2	Gerard Giraldo	Colombia	DNF	
	2	Said El Otmani	Italy	DNF	
	2	Viro Ma	Cambodia	DNF	
	1	Jonathan Busby	Aruba	DSQ	144.3(f)

=== Final ===
The final was started on 30 September at 21:20.

Rank	Name	Nationality	Time	Notes
1st place, gold medalist(s)	Muktar Edris	Ethiopia	12:58.85	SB
2nd place, silver medalist(s)	Selemon Barega	Ethiopia	12:59.70	
3rd place, bronze medalist(s)	Mohammed Ahmed	Canada	13:01.11	
4	Telahun Haile Bekele	Ethiopia	13:02.29	
5	Jakob Ingebrigtsen	Norway	13:02.93	
6	Jacob Krop	Kenya	13:03.08	PB
7	Paul Chelimo	United States	13:04.60	SB
8	Nicholas Kimeli	Kenya	13:05.27	
9	Birhanu Balew	Bahrain	13:14.66	
10	Justyn Knight	Canada	13:26.63	
11	Hassan Mead	United States	13:27.05	
12	Stewart McSweyn	Australia	13:30.41	
13	Henrik Ingebrigtsen	Norway	13:36.25	
14	Isaac Kimeli	Belgium	13:44.29	
	Filip Ingebrigtsen	Norway	DNF	
