= 2019 World Athletics Championships – Women's 10,000 metres =

Women's 10,000 metres at the 2019 World Championships
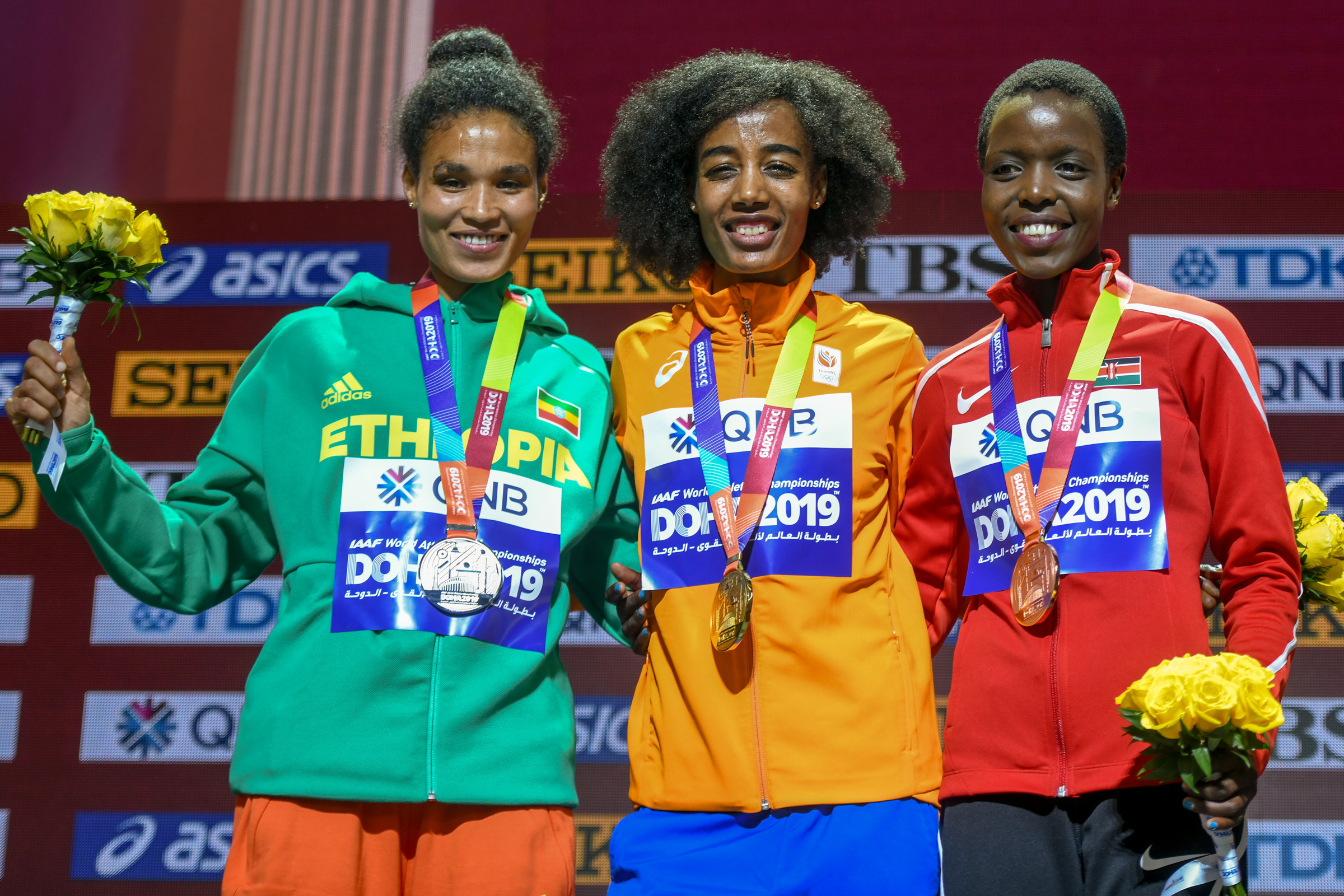
- The medal ceremony of the event.
- Venue: Khalifa International Stadium
- Dates: 28 September 2019
- Competitors: 22 from 11 nations
- Winning time: 30:17.62

Medalists
gold medal	Sifan Hassan	Netherlands
silver medal	Letesenbet Gidey	Ethiopia
bronze medal	Agnes Jebet Tirop	Kenya

Video on YouTube Official Video

The women's 10,000 metres at the World Athletics Championships was held at the Khalifa International Stadium in Doha, Qatar, on 28 September 2019.

== Summary ==
At the beginning, none of the favorites wanted to lead the race, so leading duties fell on Alina Reh to keep the pace honest, 9:29.69 for the 3000 metres. A lap later, #3 Kenyan Rosemary Wanjiru accelerated. The field strung out. Her teammates Hellen Obiri and Agnes Tirop followed. If it was a sacrificial tactic, the Ethiopian team took the bait. Letesenbet Gidey, Netsanet Gudeta and Senbere Teferi came forward in chase of the breakaway. The only other athlete to join the lead group was Sifan Hassan, who took a little more than a lap to bridge the gap from the back of the pack. The Kenyan team shared the leading duties, pushing the pace down to 15:32:70. Gudeta couldn't keep up with the fast pace, eventually dropping out. The Kenyan efforts kept driving the train until 4 laps to go when World leader Gidey quickly accelerated to the lead. The Kenyans struggled to keep up, again late to bridge the gap, Hassan went around the Kenyan team to catch Gidey just before the bell. Running around lapped runners, Hassan extended the gap to win by 3.5 seconds in 30:17.62. Tirop held on for bronze.

Hassan was running only her second 10,000 ever; her first being her qualifying run at Stanford. Her only other experience at the distance was a 34:28 road 10K from 2012. The first 5 were the fastest 5 times of the season. Excepting Teferi, it was personal bests for the first 8 and 11 total in the race. 42 year old Sinead Diver's personal best turned out to be the W40 Masters World Record.

After setting the world record in the Mile, the 1500 was the primary target for Hassan. A week later, she completed the double a week later. Hassan had previously attempted doubles at the Olympics and previous two World Championships, even picking up a bronze medal in the 5000 in 2017. With a lack of success at 800 metres and the 5000 scheduled on same nights as the 1500, the odd 10,000/1500 double has never previously been accomplished at this level. Only Paavo Nurmi has gold medals in both events and his were in different Olympiads.

== Records ==
Before the competition, the records were as follows:

Record	Perf.	Athlete	Nat.	Date	Location
World	29:17.45	Almaz Ayana	ETH	12 Aug 2016	Rio de Janeiro, Brazil
World Championships	30:04.18	Berhane Adere	ETH	23 Aug 2003	Paris, France
World leading	30:37.89	Letesenbet Gidey	ETH	17 Jul 2019	Hengelo, Netherlands
African	29:17.45	Almaz Ayana	ETH	12 Aug 2016	Rio de Janeiro, Brazil
Asian	29:31.78	Junxia Wang	CHN	8 Sep 1993	Beijing, China
North, Central American and Caribbean	30:13.17	Molly Huddle	USA	12 Aug 2016	Rio de Janeiro, Brazil
South American	31:47.76	Carmem de Oliveira	BRA	21 Aug 1993	Stuttgart, Germany
European	30:01.09	Paula Radcliffe	GBR	6 Aug 2002	Munich, Germany
Oceanian	30:35.54	Kim Smith	NZL	4 May 2008	Palo Alto, United States

== Schedule ==
The event schedule, in local time (UTC+3), was as follows:

Date	Time	Round
28 September	21:10	Final

== Results ==
=== Final ===
The final was started at 21:10.

Rank	Name	Nationality	Time	Notes
1st place, gold medalist(s)	Sifan Hassan	Netherlands	30:17.62	WL PB
2nd place, silver medalist(s)	Letesenbet Gidey	Ethiopia	30:21.23	PB
3rd place, bronze medalist(s)	Agnes Jebet Tirop	Kenya	30:25.20	PB
4	Rosemary Wanjiru	Kenya	30:35.75	PB
5	Hellen Obiri	Kenya	30:35.82	PB
6	Senbere Teferi	Ethiopia	30:44.23	SB
7	Susan Krumins	Netherlands	31:05.40	PB
8	Marielle Hall	United States	31:05.71	PB
9	Molly Huddle	United States	31:07.24	
10	Emily Sisson	United States	31:12.56	
11	Hitomi Niiya	Japan	31:12.99	SB
12	Camille Buscomb	New Zealand	31:13.21	PB
13	Ellie Pashley	Australia	31:18.89	PB
14	Sinead Diver	Australia	31:25.49	MWR PB
15	Stephanie Twell	Great Britain & N.I.	31:44.79	
16	Stella Chesang	Uganda	32:15.20	
17	Natasha Wodak	Canada	32:31.19	
18	Rachael Zena Chebet	Uganda	32:41.93	PB
19	Minami Yamanouchi	Japan	32:53.46	
20	Juliet Chekwel	Uganda	33:28.18	
	Netsanet Gudeta	Ethiopia	DNF	
	Alina Reh	Germany	DNF	
