= 2019 World Athletics Championships – Men's 3000 metres steeplechase =

Men's 3000 metres steeplechase at the 2019 World Championships
- Venue: Khalifa International Stadium
- Dates: 1 October 2019 (heats); 4 October 2019 (final)
- Competitors: 46 from 26 nations
- Winning time: 8:01.35

Medalists
gold medal	Conseslus Kipruto	Kenya
silver medal	Lamecha Girma	Ethiopia
bronze medal	Soufiane El Bakkali	Morocco

Video on YouTube Official Video

The men's 3000 metres steeplechase at the 2019 World Athletics Championships was held at the Khalifa International Stadium in Doha from 1 to 4 October 2019.

The winning margin was 0.01 seconds which as of 2024 is the only time the men's 3,000 metres steeplechase has been won by less than 0.2 seconds at these championships.

== Summary ==
Kenya considers the steeplechase to be their national sport. With defending champion Conseslus Kipruto, they qualified four to the final. the USA, with two Kenyan ex-pats and Ethiopia, also qualified all three of their entrants. This was only the second major championship since 2007 without perennial medalist Mahiedine Mekhissi-Benabbad. Kipruto almost didn't make it. A stress fracture in April would sideline him for months, but he builds a primitive swimming pool at his home in Mosoriot Kenya to do aqua training until he could run again.

While they are a neighboring long-distance running rival, Ethiopia does not have the same successful track record in the steeplechase, but was encouraged by Getnet Wale winning the 2019 IAAF Diamond League. Here the Ethiopians took to the lead. Chala Beyo took the point first with Wale, and Kipruto pushing the pace out front. After two laps, Wale took over. Beyo would not finish. Starting slower, Lamecha Girma ran in the middle of the pack for a while before moving forward to take over leading duties for the team. The fast pace dropped off many of the runners, the lead pack dwindling to the entire Kenyan team, Hillary Bor, Djilali Bedrani, returning silver medalist Soufiane El Bakkali, Wale and Girma. With two laps to go, Kipruto moved out to the lead and looked around for his teammates to join him, but help did not come forward. Instead, Wale moved ahead again and El Bakkali planted himself on Kipruto's shoulder. As the pace increased, the other three Kenyan's fell off the back of the pack. Bedrani and Bor were the next to go. It was a four-man group at the bell with Girma on the tail end. Through the penultimate turn, El Bakkali took the lead. For most of the last decade, the steeplechase was decided by a devastating move off the first barrier on the backstretch, usually by Ezekiel Kemboi. It is where Kipruto won the race in 2017 and the Olympics in 2016. Here, coming off the barrier, Kipruto gained a couple of feet on Wale but El Bakkali remained in command. Instead, Girma ran around the group and into the lead. Kipruto tried to react, passing El Bakkali over the water jump. Wale had no answer for the speed and the medalists were decided. Going into the final barrier, Girma opened up two metres on Kipruto. Coming off the barrier, Kipruto launched into a sprint gaining slightly on Girma. Desperately looking for the finish Girma dipped a little early, Kipruto dipped like a seasoned professional hurdler. In the photo finish, Kipruto took the gold by .01. 18-year-old Girma got the consolation prize of the Ethiopian national record that 19-year-old Wale had improved twice already in 2019.

== Records ==
Before the competition records were as follows:

World record	Saif Saaeed Shaheen (QAT)	7:53.63	Brussels, Belgium	3 September 2004
Championship record	Ezekiel Kemboi (KEN)	8:00.43	Berlin, Germany	18 August 2009
World Leading	Soufiane El Bakkali (MAR)	8:04.82	Monaco	12 July 2019
African Record	Brimin Kiprop Kipruto (KEN)	7:53.64	Monaco	22 July 2011
Asian Record	Saif Saaeed Shaheen (QAT)	7:53.63	Brussels, Belgium	3 September 2004
North, Central American and Caribbean record	Evan Jager (USA)	8:00.45	Paris, France	4 July 2015
South American Record	Wander do Prado Moura (BRA)	8:14.41	Mar del Plata, Argentina	22 March 1995
European Record	Mahiedine Mekhissi (FRA)	8:00.09	Paris, France	6 July 2013
Oceanian record	Peter Renner (NZL)	8:14.05	Koblenz, West Germany	29 August 1984

== Qualification standard ==
The standard to qualify automatically for entry was 8:29.00.

== Schedule ==
The event schedule, in local time (UTC+3), was as follows:

Date	Time	Round
1 October	18:15	Heats
4 October	21:45	Final

== Results ==
=== Heats ===
The first three in each heat (Q) and the next six fastest (q) qualified for the final.

Rank	Heat	Name	Nationality	Time	Notes
1	1	Getnet Wale	Ethiopia	8:12.96	Q
2	1	Djilali Bedrani	France	8:13.02	Q
3	1	Leonard Kipkemoi Bett	Kenya	8:13.07	Q
4	1	Matthew Hughes	Canada	8:13.12	q, SB
5	1	Fernando Carro	Spain	8:13.56	q
6	2	Lamecha Girma	Ethiopia	8:16.64	Q
7	2	Soufiane El Bakkali	Morocco	8:17.96	Q
8	2	Abraham Kibiwott	Kenya	8:18.46	Q
9	2	Andrew Bayer	United States	8:18.66	q
10	1	Stanley Kebenei	United States	8:19.02	q
11	3	Conseslus Kipruto	Kenya	8:19.20	Q
12	3	Benjamin Kigen	Kenya	8:19.44	Q
13	3	Hillary Bor	United States	8:20.67	Q
14	3	Chala Beyo	Ethiopia	8:21.09	q
15	1	Zak Seddon	Great Britain & N.I.	8:22.51	q
16	2	Albert Chemutai	Uganda	8:23.08	
17	3	Ibrahim Ezzaydouni	Spain	8:23.99	
18	3	Benjamin Kiplagat	Uganda	8:24.44	SB
19	1	Yohanes Chiappinelli	Italy	8:24.73	
20	3	Avinash Sable	India	8:25.23	qR, NR
21	2	Altobeli da Silva	Brazil	8:25.34	SB
22	1	Amor Ben Yahia	Tunisia	8:26.12	SB
23	2	Yemane Haileselassie	Eritrea	8:26.58	
24	1	Martin Grau	Germany	8:26.79	SB
25	1	Tom Erling Kårbø	Norway	8:27.01	PB
26	1	Boniface Abel Sikowo	Uganda	8:27.96	
27	2	Osama Zoghlami	Italy	8:28.57	
28	2	Daniel Arce	Spain	8:31.69	
29	3	Topi Raitanen	Finland	8:32.44	
30	3	Ryan Smeeton	Canada	8:32.53	
31	2	Karl Bebendorf	Germany	8:32.58	
32	2	John Gay	Canada	8:33.74	
33	3	Carlos San Martín	Colombia	8:35.10	
34	2	Bilal Tabti	Algeria	8:35.15	
35	3	Salem Mohamed Attiaallah	Egypt	8:35.18	
36	1	Abdelkarim Ben Zahra	Morocco	8:36.67	
37	3	Yoann Kowal	France	8:37.90	
38	3	Takele Nigate	Ethiopia	8:38.34	
39	1	Kaur Kivistik	Estonia	8:39.26	
40	3	Yaser Bagharab	Qatar	8:39.65	
41	2	Rantso Mokopane	South Africa	8:42.22	
42	2	Ben Buckingham	Australia	8:42.86	
43	2	Krystian Zalewski	Poland	8:51.79	
44	3	Otmane Nait-Hammou	Athlete Refugee Team	9:30.17	
	1	Fouad Idbafdil	Athlete Refugee Team	DNF	
	3	Mohamed Tindouft	Morocco	DNF	

=== Final ===
The final was started on 4 October at 21:45.

Rank	Name	Nationality	Time	Notes
1st place, gold medalist(s)	Conseslus Kipruto	Kenya	8:01.35	WL
2nd place, silver medalist(s)	Lamecha Girma	Ethiopia	8:01.36	NR
3rd place, bronze medalist(s)	Soufiane El Bakkali	Morocco	8:03.76	SB
4	Getnet Wale	Ethiopia	8:05.21	PB
5	Djilali Bedrani	France	8:05.23	PB
6	Benjamin Kigen	Kenya	8:06.95	
7	Abraham Kibiwott	Kenya	8:08.52	
8	Hillary Bor	United States	8:09.33	
9	Leonard Kipkemoi Bett	Kenya	8:10.64	
10	Stanley Kebenei	United States	8:11.15	SB
11	Fernando Carro	Spain	8:12.31	
12	Andrew Bayer	United States	8:12.47	PB
13	Avinash Sable	India	8:21.37	NR
14	Matthew Hughes	Canada	8:24.78	
15	Zak Seddon	Great Britain & N.I.	8:40.23	
	Chala Beyo	Ethiopia	DNF	
