= Minami Yamanouchi =

Japanese long-distance runner

Personal information
- Nationality: Japanese
- Born: 21 December 1992 (age 32)

Sport
- Sport: Athletics
- Event: Long-distance running

Minami Yamanouchi (山ノ内 みなみ, Yamanouchi Minami; born 21 December 1992) is a Japanese athlete. She competed in the women's 10,000 metres event at the 2019 World Athletics Championships.
