= 2019 World Athletics Championships – Women's 1500 metres =

Women's 1500 metres at the 2019 World Championships
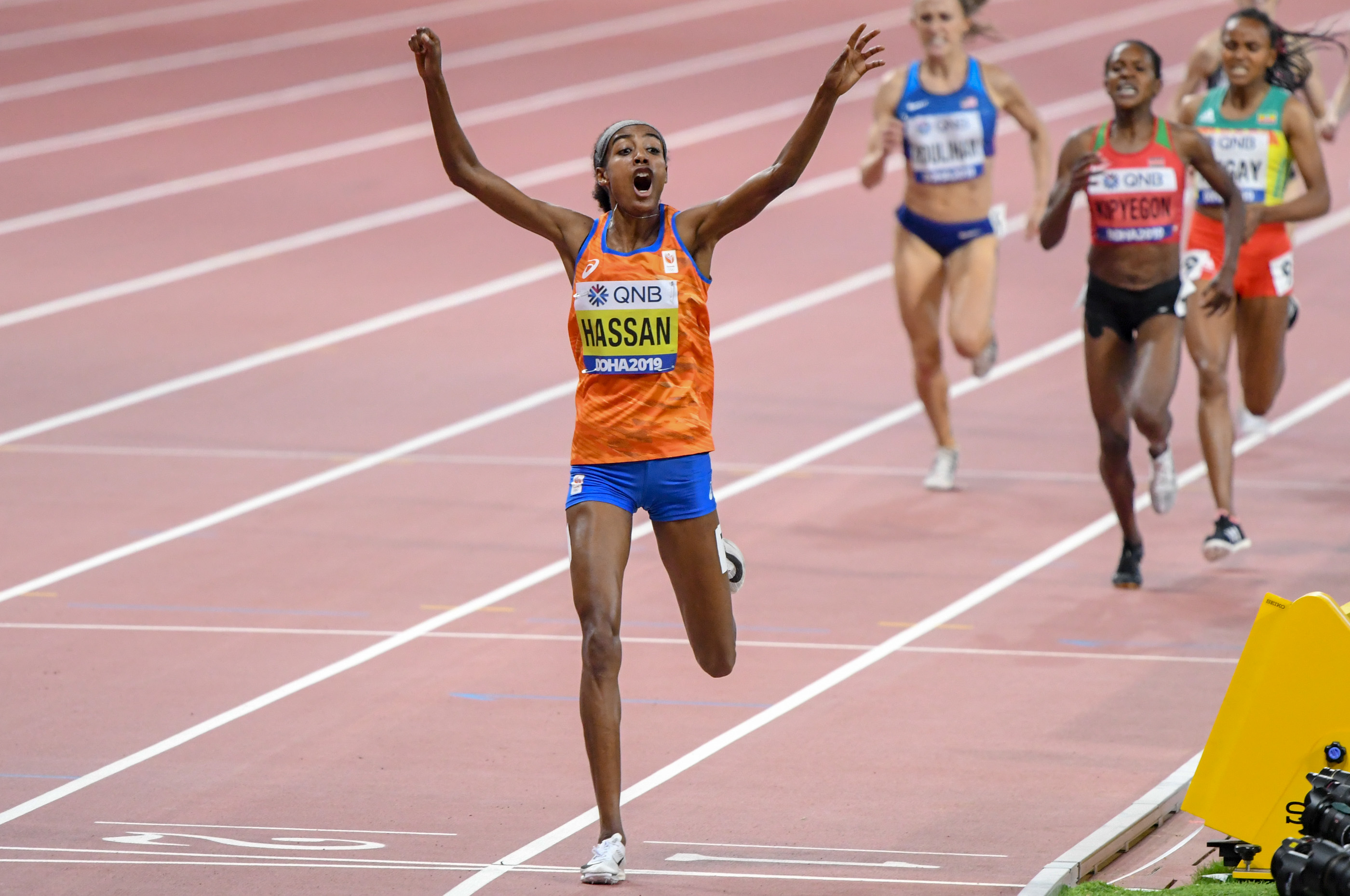
- Sifan Hassan at the finish line in the final
- Venue: Khalifa International Stadium
- Dates: 2 October (heats); 3 October (semi-final); 5 October (final)
- Competitors: 35 from 23 nations
- Winning time: 3:51.95

Medalists
gold medal	Sifan Hassan	Netherlands
silver medal	Faith Kipyegon	Kenya
bronze medal	Gudaf Tsegay	Ethiopia

Video on YouTube Official Video

The women's 1500 metres at the 2019 World Athletics Championships was held at the Khalifa International Stadium in Doha, Qatar, from 2 to 5 October 2019.

== Summary ==
Like the men, championship level women's 1500s also typically turn into strategic, sit and kick affairs. In 2017, strategic worked for Faith Kipyegon to leave the world record holder Genzebe Dibaba behind. Sifan Hassan was also left behind by that tactic. In 2019, she set the world record in the mile and had already won the 10,000 metres at these championships.

The final started inauspiciously enough, Gabriela DeBues-Stafford eventually found herself in the lead, Hassan dropped to the back of the pack. After 200 metres, Hassan moved out to lane 2 and moved forward around everyone into the lead. Kipyegon and Gudaf Tsegay moved in behind her to watch. Even with the slow start the first lap was 1:03.51. None of the chasing runners looked relaxed, most were working hard to stay up. Laura Muir and Jenny Simpson moved up toward the front. The second lap was 1:02.44. During the third lap, Muir positioned herself for the final lap, getting onto Kipyegon's shoulder coming onto the home stretch, then up to Hassan's just before the bell at 2:52.59. Muir stayed in position through the turn, Kipyegon and Tsegay behind her a gap forming behind. Hassan ran the third lap in 1:01.46, then looked back at Muir and took off sprinting. A big gap formed quickly, Kipyegon going around Muir in chase. Hassan kept looking back like a hunted animal being chased, but the gap continued to grow as did Kipyegon's separation from the next group of four; Muir, Tsegay, Shelby Houlihan with DeBues-Stafford trying to hold on. As Kipyegon saw hope was lost, she began to slow back toward the chasers. Houlihan moved to lane 2 to try to sprint past Tsegay, instead Tsegay pulled away gaining on Kipyegon. Hassan won by close to 15 metres. Kipyegon glided across the line for silver barely ahead of a rapidly closing Tsegay.

Hassan's time of 3:51.95, places her as the #6 runner in history behind Dibaba and two infamous races in China in the 1990s. Well beaten, Kipyegon, Tsegay and Houlihan moved to #11, #13 and #15 on that list respectively. Even sixth place DeBues-Stafford ranks as #21. Hassan set the European record that had been held by Soviet Tatyana Kazankina for 39 years, Houlihan the North American record, Kipyegon the Kenyan record and DeBues-Stafford the Canadian record.

== Records ==
Before the competition records were as follows:

Record	Perf.	Athlete	Nat.	Date	Location
World	3:50.07	Genzebe Dibaba	ETH	17 Jul 2015	Monaco
Championship	3:58.52	Tatyana Tomashova	RUS	31 Aug 2003	Paris, France
World leading	3:55.30	Sifan Hassan	NED	12 Jul 2019	Monaco
African	3:50.07	Genzebe Dibaba	ETH	17 Jul 2015	Monaco
Asian	3:50.46	Qu Yunxia	CHN	11 Sep 1993	Beijing, China
NACAC	3:56.29	Shannon Rowbury	USA	17 July 2015	Monaco
South American	4:05.67	Letitia Vriesde	SUR	31 Aug 1991	Tokyo, Japan
European	3:52.47	Tatyana Kazankina	RUS	31 Aug 1980	Zürich, Switzerland
Oceanian	4:00.86	Linden Hall	AUS	26 May 2018	Eugene, United States

The following records were established during the competition:

Date	Event	Name	Nationality	Time	Record
5 October	Final	Sifan Hassan	NED	3:51.95	CR, AR

== Schedule ==
The event schedule, in local time (UTC+3), is as follows:

Date	Time	Round
2 October	17:35	Heats
3 October	23:00	Semi-finals
5 October	20:55	Final

== Results ==
=== Heats ===
The first six in each heat (Q) and the next six fastest (q) qualified for the semi-finals.

Rank	Heat	Name	Nationality	Time	Notes
1	1	Sifan Hassan	Netherlands	4:03.88	Q
2	1	Faith Kipyegon	Kenya	4:03.93	Q
3	1	Nikki Hiltz	United States	4:04.00	Q
4	1	Winnie Nanyondo	Uganda	4:04.04	Q
5	1	Ciara Mageean	Ireland	4:04.18	Q
6	1	Sarah McDonald	Great Britain & N.I.	4:04.42	Q
7	1	Lemlem Hailu	Ethiopia	4:05.61	q
8	1	Kristiina Mäki	Czech Republic	4:06.61	q, PB
9	1	Esther Guerrero	Spain	4:06.99	q
10	3	Jenny Simpson	United States	4:07.27	Q
11	3	Gabriela DeBues-Stafford	Canada	4:07.28	Q
12	3	Laura Muir	Great Britain & N.I.	4:07.37	Q
13	3	Marta Pérez	Spain	4:07.48	Q
14	1	Georgia Griffith	Australia	4:07.73	q
15	3	Claudia Bobocea	Romania	4:07.76	Q
16	3	Malika Akkaoui	Morocco	4:08.05	Q
17	3	Linden Hall	Australia	4:08.12	q
18	3	Daryia Barysevich	Belarus	4:08.19	q
19	2	Rababe Arafi	Morocco	4:08.32	Q
20	2	Winny Chebet	Kenya	4:08.36	Q
21	2	Gudaf Tsegay	Ethiopia	4:08.39	Q
22	2	Shelby Houlihan	United States	4:08.51	Q
23	3	Axumawit Embaye	Ethiopia	4:08.56	
24	2	Jessica Hull	Australia	4:08.71	Q
25	1	Sara Kuivisto	Finland	4:08.85	PB
26	3	Esther Chebet	Uganda	4:08.89	
27	2	Yolanda Ngarambe	Sweden	4:09.22	Q
28	3	María Pía Fernández	Uruguay	4:09.45	NR
29	2	Aisha Praught-Leer	Jamaica	4:09.81	
30	2	P. U. Chitra	India	4:11.10	PB
31	2	Caterina Granz	Germany	4:12.36	
32	2	Jemma Reekie	Great Britain & N.I.	4:12.51	
33	2	Maruša Mišmaš	Slovenia	4:14.94	
34	2	Carla Mendes	Cape Verde	4:23.56	
35	3	Neide Dias	Angola	4:28.27	

=== Semi-finals ===
The first 5 in each heat (Q) and the next two fastest (q) qualified for the final.

Rank	Heat	Name	Nationality	Time	Notes
1	2	Jenny Simpson	United States	4:00.99	Q
2	2	Gabriela DeBues-Stafford	Canada	4:01.04	Q
3	2	Laura Muir	Great Britain & N.I.	4:01.05	Q
4	2	Gudaf Tsegay	Ethiopia	4:01.12	Q
5	2	Winny Chebet	Kenya	4:01.14	Q
6	2	Winnie Nanyondo	Uganda	4:01.30	q
7	2	Nikki Hiltz	United States	4:01.52	q, PB
8	2	Jessica Hull	Australia	4:01.80	PB
9	2	Yolanda Ngarambe	Sweden	4:03.43	PB
10	2	Linden Hall	Australia	4:06.39	
11	2	Marta Pérez	Spain	4:10.45	
12	1	Sifan Hassan	Netherlands	4:14.69	Q
13	1	Shelby Houlihan	United States	4:14.91	Q
14	1	Rababe Arafi	Morocco	4:14.94	Q
15	1	Faith Kipyegon	Kenya	4:14.98	Q
16	1	Ciara Mageean	Ireland	4:15.49	Q
17	1	Sarah McDonald	Great Britain & N.I.	4:15.73	
18	1	Lemlem Hailu	Ethiopia	4:16.56	
19	1	Esther Guerrero	Spain	4:16.66	
20	2	Malika Akkaoui	Morocco	4:16.83	
21	1	Daryia Barysevich	Belarus	4:17.04	
22	1	Georgia Griffith	Australia	4:17.15	
23	1	Kristiina Mäki	Czech Republic	4:17.65	
24	1	Claudia Bobocea	Romania	4:18.25	

=== Final ===
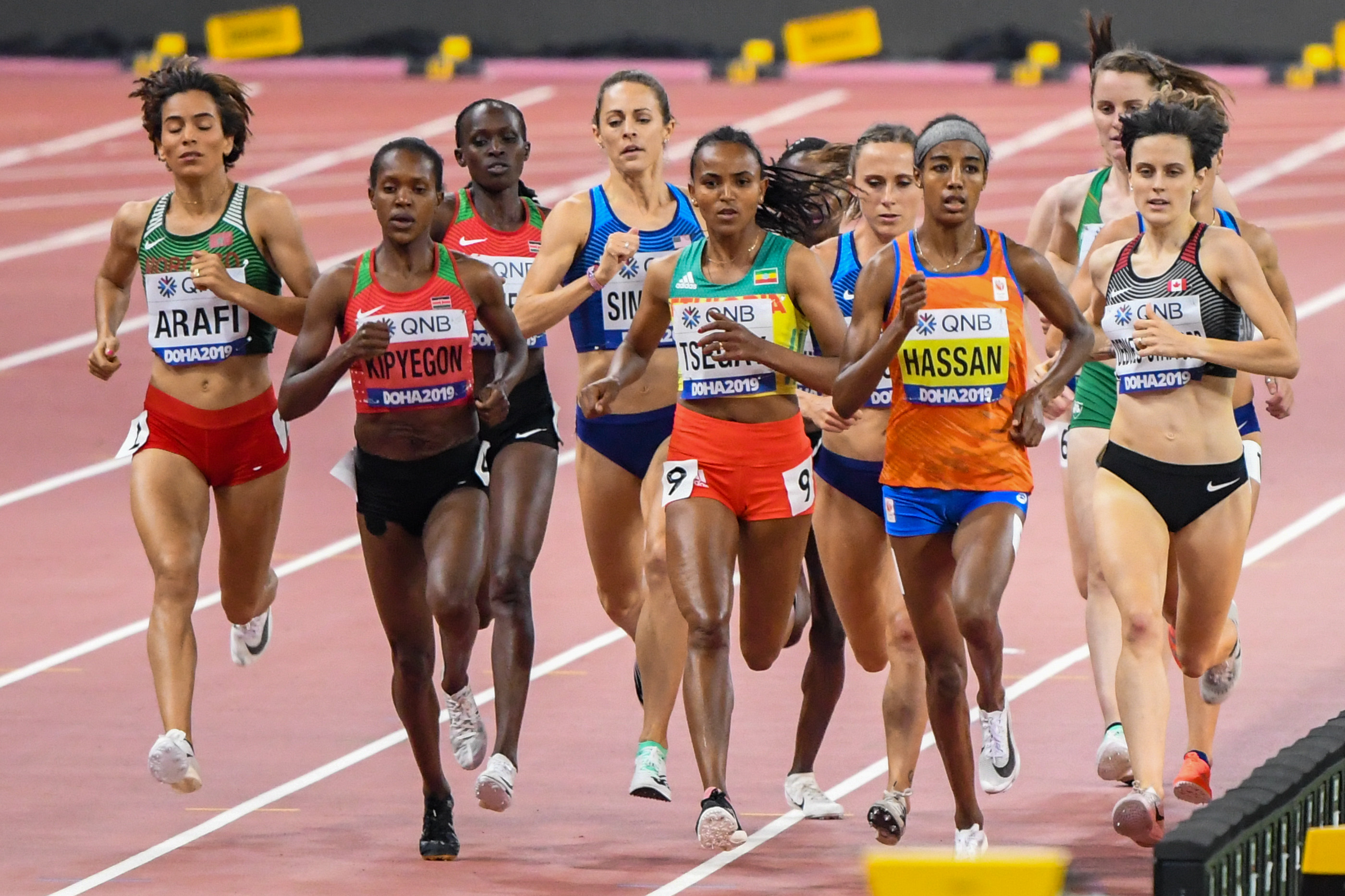
Runners during the final

The final was started on 5 October at 20:55.

Rank	Name	Nationality	Time	Notes
1st place, gold medalist(s)	Sifan Hassan	Netherlands	3:51.95	CR, AR
2nd place, silver medalist(s)	Faith Kipyegon	Kenya	3:54.22	NR
3rd place, bronze medalist(s)	Gudaf Tsegay	Ethiopia	3:54.38	PB
4	Shelby Houlihan	United States	3:54.99	AR
5	Laura Muir	Great Britain & N.I.	3:55.76	SB
6	Gabriela DeBues-Stafford	Canada	3:56.12	NR
7	Winny Chebet	Kenya	3:58.20	PB
8	Jenny Simpson	United States	3:58.42	SB
9	Rababe Arafi	Morocco	3:59.93	
10	Ciara Mageean	Ireland	4:00.15	PB
11	Winnie Nanyondo	Uganda	4:00.63	
12	Nikki Hiltz	United States	4:06.68	
