= Great Britain and Northern Ireland at the 2019 World Athletics Championships =

- WA code: GBR
- Website: www.britishathletics.org.uk

in Doha
- Competitors: 77
- Medals Ranked 6th: Gold 2 Silver 3 Bronze 0 Total 5

World Athletics Championships appearances (overview)
- 1976; 1980; 1983; 1987; 1991; 1993; 1995; 1997; 1999; 2001; 2003; 2005; 2007; 2009; 2011; 2013; 2015; 2017; 2019; 2022; 2023; 2025

Great Britain and Northern Ireland competed at the 2019 IAAF World Championships in Doha, from 27 September–6 October 2019. The nation won five medals at the championships – two gold medals, and three silvers. Dina Asher-Smith became the first British person to win three medals at a single championships, winning the women's 200 metres, taking silver in the Women's 100 metres, then getting another silver in the women's 4 × 100 metres relay. Asher-Smith broke the British records in both the 100 m and 200 m. She was Britain's first female sprint champion. Katarina Johnson-Thompson was the only other Briton to win an individual medal, taking the heptathlon gold medal with a British record score. The British men's 4 × 100 metres relay quarter (Adam Gemili, Zharnel Hughes, Richard Kilty, Nethaneel Mitchell-Blake) ran a European record of 37.36 seconds to take a silver medal. The women's 4 × 400 metres relay team was briefly upgraded to the bronze medal, but the original medallists Jamaica were reinstated on appeal. Great Britain won the lowest number of medals since its performance at the 2005 World Championships in Athletics.

Domestic television coverage was broadcast by the BBC, with Gabby Logan and Jeanette Kwakye presenting, former Olympic champions Michael Johnson, Denise Lewis, Jessica Ennis-Hill and Daley Thompson providing analysis, Radzi Chinyanganya and triple jumper Naomi Ogbeta on reportage, and commentary being given by Steve Cram, Andrew Cotter, Paula Radcliffe, Steve Backley, Colin Jackson and Toni Minichiello, and Mark Butler returning as statistician.

== Medallists ==
Medal	Name	Event	Date
Gold	Dina Asher-Smith	Women's 200 metres	2 October
Gold	Katarina Johnson-Thompson	Women's Heptathlon	3 October
Silver	Dina Asher-Smith	Women's 100 metres	29 September
Silver	Asha Philip; Dina Asher-Smith; Ashleigh Nelson; Daryll Neita; Imani-Lara Lansiquot^{†}	Women's 4 × 100 metres relay	5 October
Silver	Adam Gemili; Zharnel Hughes; Richard Kilty; Nethaneel Mitchell-Blake	Men's 4 × 100 metres relay	5 October

- ^{†} Ran in heats only

== Results ==
Key

- Q = Qualified for the next round
- q = Qualified for the next round as a fastest loser or, in field events, by position without achieving the qualifying target
- NR = National record
- AR = Area/Continental record
- PB = Personal best
- SB = Season's best
- N/A = Round not applicable for the event

=== Men ===
Track and road events

Athlete	Event	Heat		Semifinal		Final	
Athlete	Event	Result	Rank	Result	Rank	Result	Rank
Ojie Edoburun	100 metres	10.23	24 q	10.22	20	Did not advance	
Adam Gemili	100 metres	10.19	18 Q	10.13	11	Did not advance	
Zharnel Hughes	100 metres	10.08	7 Q	10.05	3 Q	10.03	6
Miguel Francis	200 metres	20.11	4 Q	DNS	–	Did not advance	
Adam Gemili	200 metres	20.06 SB	1 Q	20.03 SB	4 Q	20.03 SB	4
Zharnel Hughes	200 metres	20.24 SB	10 Q	20.30	11	Did not advance	
Matthew Hudson-Smith	400 metres	DNF	–	Did not advance			
Rabah Yousif	400 metres	45.40	12 Q	45.15 SB	4	Did not advance	
Elliot Giles	800 metres	1:45.53 Q	4	1:45.15	7	Did not advance	
Kyle Langford	800 metres	1:46.14 q	18	1:46.41	19	Did not advance	
Jamie Webb	800 metres	1:46.23 Q	22	1:48.44	23	Did not advance	
Neil Gourley	1500 metres	3:36.31	4 Q	3:36.69	5 Q	3:37.30	11
Josh Kerr	1500 metres	3:36.99	11 Q	3:36.58	7 Q	3:32.52 PB	6
Jake Wightman	1500 metres	3:37.72	19 Q	3:36.85	12 q	3:31.87 PB	5
Andrew Butchart	5000 metres	13:26.46	16	—N/a		Did not advance	
Ben Connor	5000 metres	13:36.92	23	—N/a		Did not advance	
Marc Scott	5000 metres	13:47.12	29	—N/a		Did not advance	
Callum Hawkins	Marathon	—N/a				2:10.57	4
Zak Seddon	3000 metres steeplechase	8:22.51	15 q	—N/a		8:40.23	15
Andrew Pozzi	110 metres hurdles	13.53	18 Q	13.60	18	Did not advance	
Chris McAlister	400 metres hurdles	49.73	15 Q	49.18 PB	14	Did not advance	
Adam Gemili; Zharnel Hughes; Richard Kilty; Nethaneel Mitchell-Blake	4 × 100 metres relay	37.56 WL	1 Q	—N/a		37.36 AR	2nd place, silver medalist(s)
Cameron Chalmers; Toby Harries; Rabah Yousif; Lee Thompson; Martyn Rooney*	4 × 400 metres relay	3:01.96 SB	8 q	—N/a		DNF	–
Tom Bosworth	20km walk	—N/a				1:29.34	7
Callum Wilkinson	20km walk	—N/a				DSQ	–
Cameron Corbishley	50km walk	—N/a				DSQ	–
Dominic King	50km walk	—N/a				DSQ	–

* – Indicates the athlete competed in preliminaries but not the final

Field events

Athlete	Event	Qualification		Final	
Athlete	Event	Distance	Position	Distance	Position
Harry Coppell	Pole vault	DNS	–	Did not advance	
Ben Williams	Triple jump	16.77	17	Did not advance	
Nick Miller	Hammer throw	76.36	10 q	75.31	10

Combined events – Decathlon

Athlete	Event	100 m	LJ	SP	HJ	400 m	110H	DT	PV	JT	1500 m	Final	Rank
Tim Duckworth	Result	—N/a										DNS	–
Tim Duckworth	Points	—N/a										DNS	–

=== Women ===
Track and road events

Athlete	Event	Heat		Semifinal		Final	
Athlete	Event	Result	Rank	Result	Rank	Result	Rank
Dina Asher-Smith	100 metres	10.96	3 Q	10.87 SB	2 Q	10.83 NR	2nd place, silver medalist(s)
Imani-Lara Lansiquot	100 metres	11.31	24 q	11.35	22	Did not advance	
Daryll Neita	100 metres	11.12 PB	5 Q	11.18	11	Did not advance	
Asha Philip	100 metres	11.35	28	Did not advance			
Dina Asher-Smith	200 metres	22.32	1 Q	22.16	1 Q	21.88 NR	1st place, gold medalist(s)
Beth Dobbin	200 metres	23.14	23 Q	23.11	19	Did not advance	
Jodie Williams	200 metres	22.80	13 Q	22.78	11	Did not advance	
Emily Diamond	400 metres	51.66 SB	16 q	51.62 SB	15	Did not advance	
Laviai Nielsen	400 metres	51.52	14 Q	52.94	22	Did not advance	
Alexandra Bell	800 metres	2:03.34	23 Q	2:01.23	14	Did not advance	
Shelayna Oskan-Clarke	800 metres	2:02.09	10 Q	2:10.89	24	Did not advance	
Lynsey Sharp	800 metres	2:03.57	31	Did not advance			
Sarah McDonald	1500 metres	4:04.42	6 Q	4:15.73	17	Did not advance	
Laura Muir	1500 metres	4:07.37	12 Q	4:01.05	3 Q	3:55.76 SB	5
Jemma Reekie	1500 metres	4:12.51	32	Did not advance			
Jessica Judd	5000 metres	15:51.48	22	—N/a		Did not advance	
Eilish McColgan	5000 metres	14:55.79	4 Q	—N/a		14:46.17 PB	10
Laura Weightman	5000 metres	15:02.24	10 Q	—N/a		14:44.57 PB	7
Stephanie Twell	10,000 metres	—N/a				31:44.79	15
Tish Jones	Marathon	—N/a				DNS	–
Charlotte Purdue	Marathon	—N/a				DNF	–
Elizabeth Bird	3000 metres steeplechase	9:30.13 PB	16	—N/a		Did not advance	
Rosie Clarke	3000 metres steeplechase	9:49.18	34	—N/a		Did not advance	
Aimee Pratt	3000 metres steeplechase	9:38.91 PB	21	—N/a		Did not advance	
Cindy Ofili	100 metres hurdles	12.97	19 Q	12.95	15	Did not advance	
Meghan Beesley	400 metres hurdles	55.97	21 Q	56.89	24	Did not advance	
Jessica Turner	400 metres hurdles	55.72 PB	17 Q	55.87	20	Did not advance	
Asha Philip; Ashleigh Nelson; Dina Asher-Smith; Daryll Neita; Imani-Lara Lansiquot*	4 × 100 metres relay	42.25 SB	2 Q	—N/a		41.85 SB	2nd place, silver medalist(s)
Zoey Clark; Emily Diamond; Jodie Williams; Laviai Nielsen; Jessica Turner*	4 × 400 metres relay	3:24.99 SB	3 Q	—N/a		3:23.02 SB	4

* – Indicates the athlete competed in preliminaries but not the final

Field events

Athlete	Event	Qualification		Final	
Athlete	Event	Distance	Position	Distance	Position
Morgan Lake	High jump	1.85	18	Did not advance	
Holly Bradshaw	Pole vault	4.60	=1 Q	4.80	4
Abigail Irozuru	Long jump	6.70	6 q	6.64	7
Shara Proctor	Long jump	6.63	8 q	6.43	11
Jazmin Sawyers	Long jump	6.46	19	Did not advance	
Sophie McKinna	Shot put	18.61 PB	6 Q	17.99	11

Combined events – Heptathlon

Athlete	Event	100H	HJ	SP	200 m	LJ	JT	800 m	Final	Rank
Katarina Johnson-Thompson	Result	13.09 PB	1.95	13.86 PB	23.08 SB	6.77	43.93 PB	2:07.26 PB	6981 WL NR	1st place, gold medalist(s)
Katarina Johnson-Thompson	Points	1111	1171	785	1071	1095	743	1005	6981 WL NR	1st place, gold medalist(s)

=== Mixed ===
Athlete	Event	Heat		Final	
Athlete	Event	Result	Rank	Result	Rank
Rabah Yousif; Zoey Clark; Emily Diamond; Martyn Rooney	4 × 400 m relay	3:12.80 AR	4	3:12.27 AR	4
