= John Gay (runner) =

Canadian track and field athlete

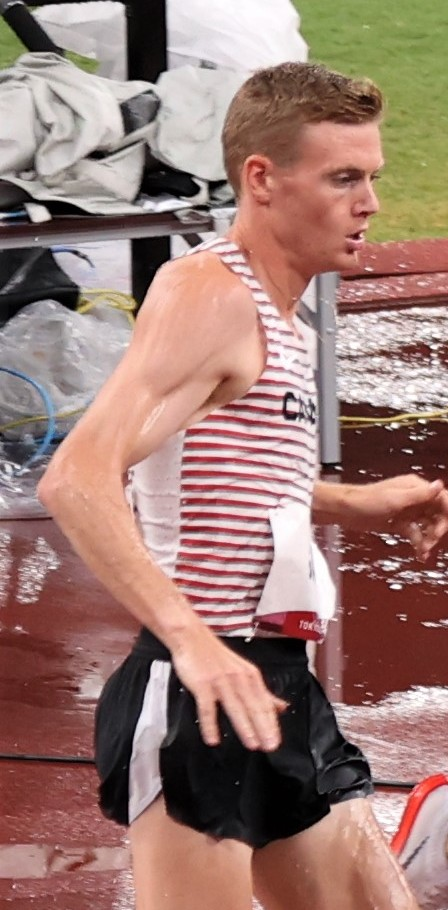
- John Gay at the 2020 Olympics

Personal information
- Full name: John Eamon Gay
- Born: 7 November 1996 (age 29) Kelowna, British Columbia, Canada

Sport
- Country: Canada
- Sport: Long-distance running

John Eamon Gay (born 7 November 1996) is a Canadian track and field Olympic Finalist who specializes in the 3000 metres steeplechase.

In June 2021, at the 2021 Canadian Olympic Trials, he established his then personal best at the 3,000 m steeple with 8:20.68 at Complexe Sportif Claude-Robillard, Montréal. This mark qualified him for the 2020 Tokyo Olympics (held in 2021 due to the COVID19 virus).

He competed in the men's 3000 metres steeplechase event at the 2020 Summer Olympics held in Tokyo, Japan. In the preliminary heats, he bettered his personal best to 8:16.99, qualifying for his first world final where he would finish 15th.

Previously, he competed in the men's 3000 metres steeplechase at the 2019 World Athletics Championships held in Doha, Qatar. He did not qualify to compete in the final.

In 2017, he competed in the men's 3000 metres steeplechase at the Summer Universiade held in Taipei, Taiwan. He finished in 11th place.

In 2019, he competed in the senior men's race at the IAAF World Cross Country Championships held in Aarhus, Denmark. He finished in 29th place.

Competing in the 2023 World Athletics Cross Country Championships, Gay placed 44th, the fastest among the Canadian team.

== Personal bests ==
Outdoor

- 1500 metres – 3:41.13 (Portland 2022)
- Mile – 3:58.14 (Burnaby 2021)
- 3000 metres – 8:03.91 (Melbourne 2023)
- 2000 metres steeplechase – 5:34.29 (Victoria 2021)
- 3000 metres steeplechase – 8:16.99 (Tokyo 2021)
- 5000 metres – 13:29.82 (Birmingham 2022)
- 10,000 metres – 28:18.10 (Burnaby 2020)

Road

- 5K – 13:58 (Moncton 2022)

Indoor

- 3000 metres – 7:45.34 (New York 2022)
- 5000 metres – 13:46.45 (Boston 2022)
