= Ellie Pashley =

Australian long-distance runner

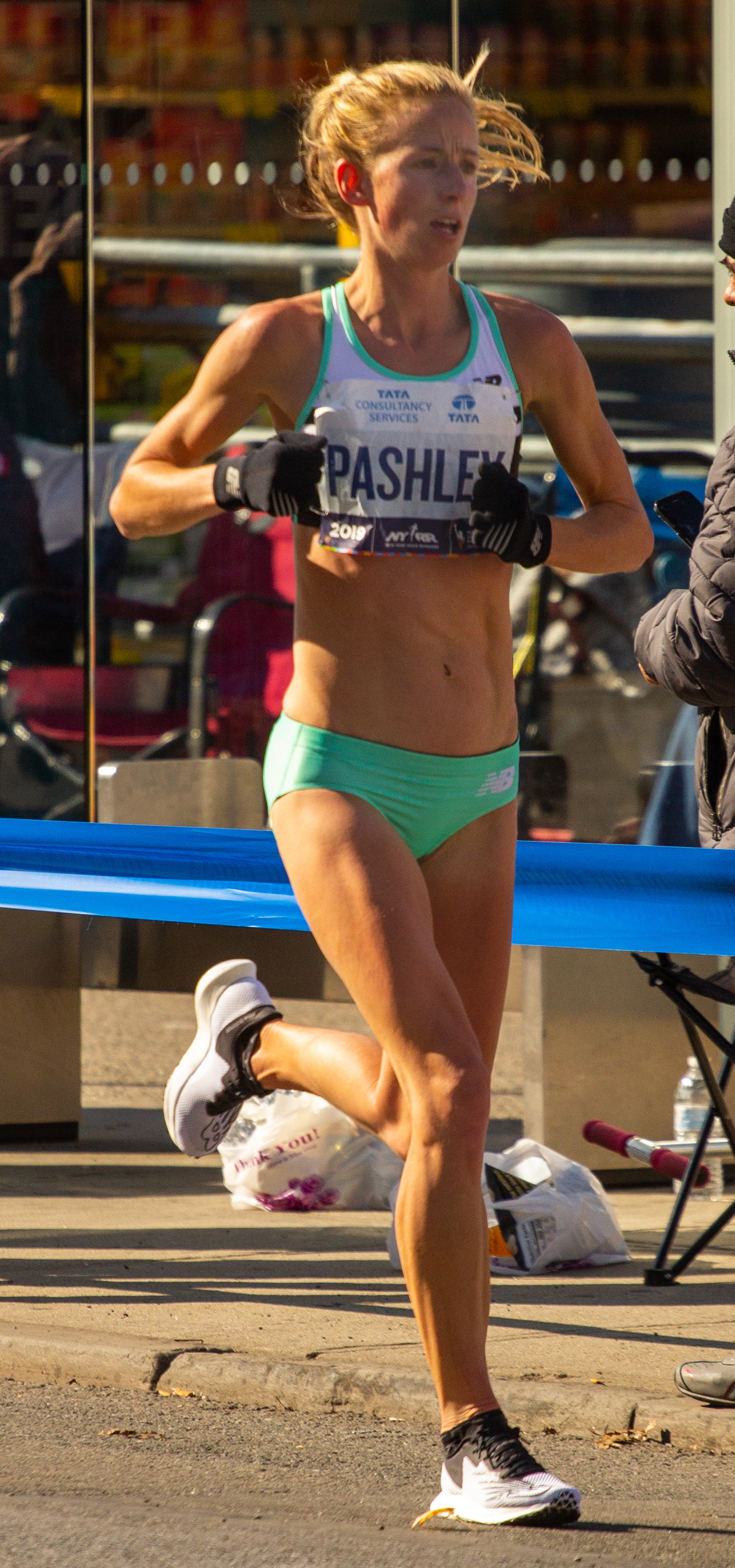
- Ellie Pashley at the 2019 New York City Marathon

Personal information
- Nationality: Australian
- Born: 10 December 1988 (age 36)

Sport
- Sport: Athletics
- Event: Long-distance running

Ellie Pashley (born 10 December 1988) is an Australian athlete. She competed in the women's 10,000 metres event at the 2019 World Athletics Championships.

In June 2021, Pashley was selected as part of the Australian marathon team for the Tokyo Olympics. She came twenty-third in the event. Her time of 2:33.39 was just over 6 minutes more than the eventual winner, Peres Jepchirchir, of Kenya.

== Early years ==
Even when very young, Pashley knew she would be an athlete. For her first 15 years, she was quite casual about it, but when she got into her twenties she took up athletics more seriously. Pashley rose into the Australian top-8 all-time in the 10,000 m, half marathon, and marathon events. In primary school, as the races got longer, Pashley performed better, but it wasn't until high school that she did more with cross country and Little Athletics.

== Achievements ==
In 2015 Pashley prepared for a marathon under the coaching of Julian Spence. She was running 100 kilometres (62 mi) per week. In 2016, at the age of 27, she ran 2:46 in her first marathon in Melbourne. A year later Pashley ran the Berlin Marathon clocking 2:35.55.

In March 2018, she represented Australia at the World Half Marathon Championships and was placed 24th with a personal best of 71:43. In September of the same year, she ran a marathon at 2:31.52. Pashley then came third at Zatopek with a personal best of 32:17.81. (Zatopek is named after the Czech distance running great Emil Zatopek and was first held in 1961. It is one of the most prestigious track races on Australian soil).

In 2019, she ran a 2:26.21 marathon in Nagoya, making her eighth Australia all-time and therefore qualifying for the Olympics. In May 2019 she ran 31:43.51 for the 10000 m securing a 2019 World Championships qualifier. At the world championships in Doha in October, she was placed 13th – the second-highest ever by an Australian. Her time of 31:18.89 moved her to number four in Australian history.
