= Alex Korio =

Kenyan long-distance runner

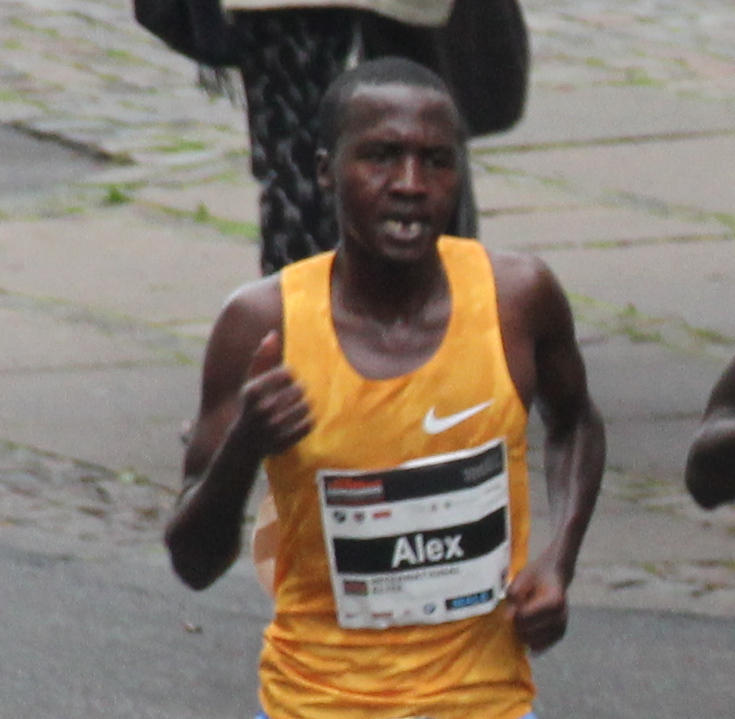

Personal information
- Born: 20 December 1990 (age 35)

Sport
- Country: Kenya
- Sport: Long-distance running

Alex Korio (born 20 December 1990) is a Kenyan long-distance runner. In 2019, he competed in the men's 10,000 metres at the 2019 World Athletics Championships held in Doha, Qatar. He finished in 11th place.

In 2016, he won the men's race at the Granollers Half Marathon held in Granollers, Catalonia, Spain.

In 2019, he won the men's race at the Beach to Beacon 10K held in Cape Elizabeth, Maine, United States. In the same year, he was also one of the pacemakers in the Ineos 1:59 Challenge, a successful attempt by Kenyan athlete Eliud Kipchoge to break the two-hour mark for running the marathon distance.

On 10 July 2020 the Athletics Integrity Unit announce Korio would be banned for competition for two years from 19 July 2019 until 18 July 2021 due to whereabouts failures.
