= Stewart McSweyn =

Australian long-distance runner (born 1995)

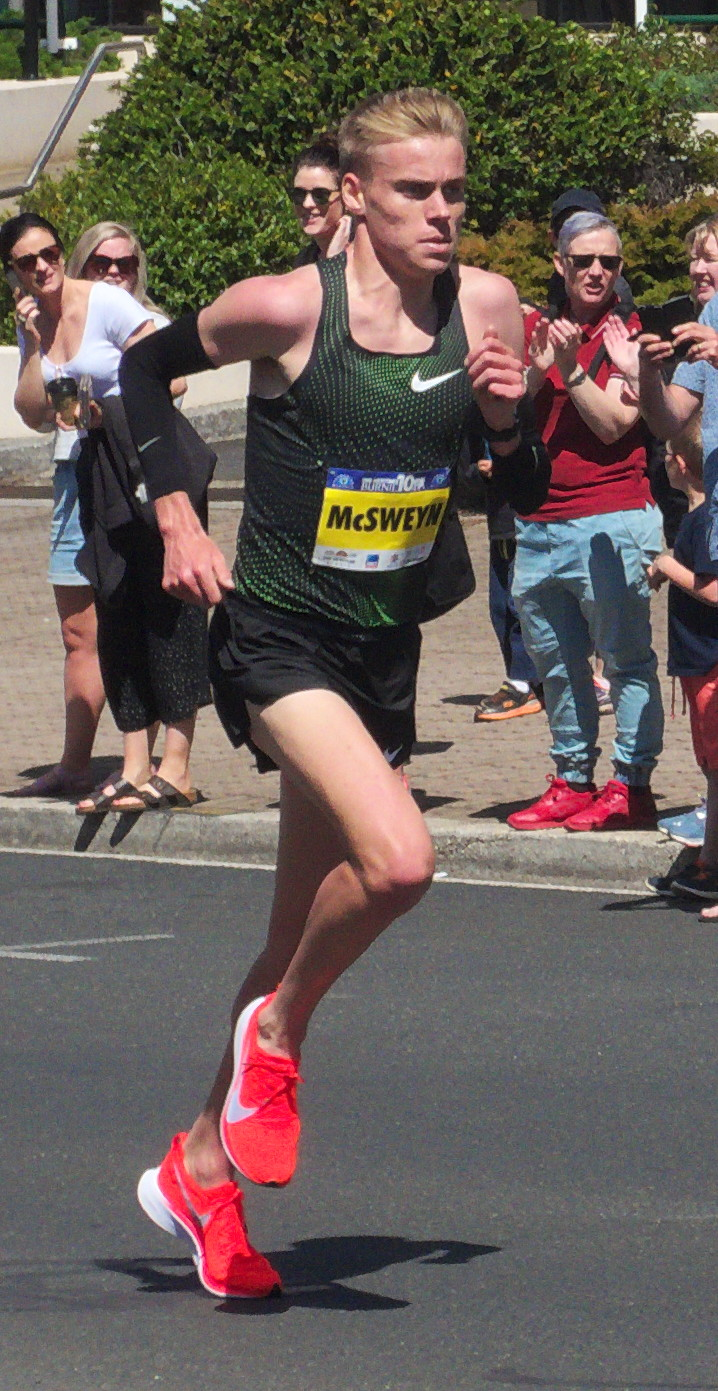
- McSweyn winning the 2018 Burnie Ten

Personal information
- Born: 1 June 1995 (age 31) Launceston, Tasmania
- Education: La Trobe University, University of Southern Queensland
- Height: 188 cm (6 ft 2 in)

Sport
- Sport: Athletics
- Events: 1500 m, 3000 m, 5000 m, 10,000 m
- Club: Ferret Track Club
- Coached by: Nic Bideau (Coach of Ferret Track Club)

Achievements and titles
- World finals: 2017; 3000 m steeple, 40th (h); 2019; 5000 m, 12th 1500 m, 21st (sf)
- Personal bests: 1500 m: 3:29.51 AR (Monaco 2021); Mile: 3:48.37 (Oslo 2021); 3000 m: 7:28.02 AR (Rome 2020); 2-mile: 8:16.28 (Palo Alto 2019); 5000 m: 12:56.07 (Los Angeles 2024); 10,000 m: 27:23.80 (Melbourne 2019); 3000 m steeple: 8:34.25 (Gothenburg 2017)
Medal record
Men's athletics
Representing Australia
World Cross Country Championships
Bronze medal – third place	2023 Bathurst	Mixed relay

Stewart "Stewie" McSweyn (born 1 June 1995) is an Australian long-distance runner. He was a finalist in the men's 1500 metres in the Tokyo Olympics, and has also been a World Championships and Commonwealth Games finalist in the 3000 metres steeplechase, 5000 metres and 10,000 metres.

== Career ==
=== Early years ===
McSweyn grew up on a beef and sheep farm on King Island (population ~1,600) in the middle of Bass Strait, south of Melbourne, Victoria.

There was no high school on the island, so he boarded at Ballarat in Victoria. Being away from home at a young age, he built resilience which helps him cope with being overseas for lengthy periods of time. Up until he was 14 years old, he played cricket, tennis and Australian rules football, but he then decided to concentrate on athletics. At Ballarat, he was coached by Rod Griffin, middle- and long-distance runner Collis Birmingham, and his now training partner Brett Robinson.

McSweyn represented Australia at the 2013 World Cross Country Championships in the junior race, and in 2015 he ran the 5000m at the World University Games.

=== International competition ===
Beginning in 2016, McSweyn started regularly competing on the international circuit.

He represented Australia in the 3000 metres steeplechase at the 2017 World Championships.

In 2018, McSweyn placed third in both the 5000m and 3000m steeplechase races at the Gold Coast Australian Championships in February. In April at the Commonwealth Games, McSweyn placed 5th in the 5000m final in 13:58.96 and 11th in the 10,000m final in 28:58.22, respectively. At the Shanghai Diamond League meet, McSweyn placed 11th in the 5000m. He raced the 10,000m race at the Oslo Bislett Games in June and the 1500m in Germany, followed by Rabat Diamond League, where he placed third in a competitive 3000m field in 7:34.79. The time put him within two and a half seconds of Craig Mottram's Australian record in the event. He then raced in the London Müller Anniversary Games 5000m, finishing 12th. In August, McSweyn raced a mile at the Birmingham Müller Grand Prix, winning in 3:54.60. He then competed in the Rovereto Palio Città della Quercia in Italy, clocking 13:31.03 for 5000m. Notably, at the Bruxelles Memorial van Damme Diamond League Final, McSweyn achieved a 13:05.23 personal best over 5000m, finishing 12th in the race. Back on home soil in 2018, McSweyn rounded out his 2018 season by winning his second straight Melbourne Zatopek:10. His 27:50.89 brought him his second straight Australian 10,000m title.

In December 2019, McSweyn broke the Australian record for 10,000m, running 27:23.80 at the Zatopek:10, his third successive national championship at the distance.

In July 2021, McSweyn broke the Australian record for the mile, running 3:48.37, beating the record set by Craig Mottram in 2005 by 0.61 seconds.

In August 2021, at the Tokyo Olympics, his time of 3:31.91 in the 1500 metres earned him seventh place.

In February 2023 at the World Athletics Cross Country Championships, held in Australia, McSweyn achieved a bronze medal in the mixed relay, alongside Oliver Hoare, Jessica Hull and Abbey Caldwell.

== International competitions ==
Year	Competition	Venue	Position	Event	Notes
Representing Australia
2015	Universiade	Gwangju, South Korea	14th	5000 m	14:37.96
2017	World Championships	London, United Kingdom	40th (h)	3000 m s'chase	8:47.53
2018	Commonwealth Games	Gold Coast, Australia	5th	5000 m	13:58.96
2018	Commonwealth Games	Gold Coast, Australia	11th	10,000 m	28:58.22
2019	World Championships	Doha, Qatar	21st (sf)	1500 m	3:37.95
2019	World Championships	Doha, Qatar	12th	5000 m	13:30.41
2021	Olympic Games	Tokyo, Japan	7th	1500 m	3:31.91
2022	World Championships	Eugene, United States	9th	1500 m	3:33.24
2023	World Championships	Budapest, Hungary	24th (h)	1500 m	3:36.01
2023	World Championships	Budapest, Hungary	13th	5000 m	13:26.58
2024	Olympic Games	Paris, France	12th (repechage)	1500 m	3:37.49
2024	Olympic Games	Paris, France	18th	5000 m	13:31.38

== Personal bests ==
Track

- 1500 metres – 3:29.51 (Monaco Diamond League, 2021)
- One mile – 3:48.37 (Oslo Diamond League, 2021)
- 3000 metres – 7:28.02 (Golden Gala, Rome 2020)
- 5000 metres – 12:56.07 (Los Angeles 2024)
- 10,000 metres – 27:23.38 (Zatopek 2019)
- 3000 metres steeplechase – 8:34.25 (Gothenburg 2017)

Road

- 5K run – 13:39 (RIga 2023)
- 10K run – 27:58 (Launceston 2025)
