= Amos Bartelsmeyer =

German middle-distance runner

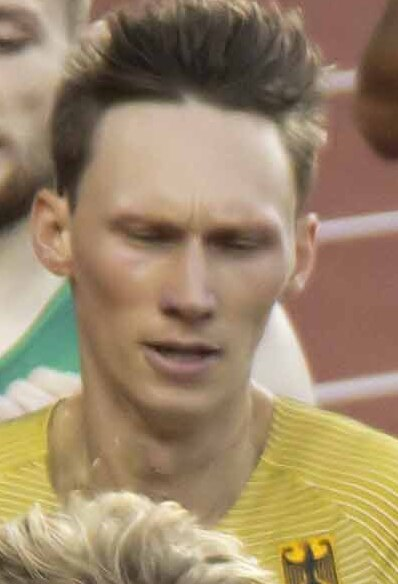
- Amos Bartelsmeyer in 2023

Personal information
- Nationality: German
- Born: 25 July 1994 (age 31) Aschaffenburg, Germany

Sport
- Sport: Athletics
- Events: 800 metres; 1500 metres; 3000 metres
- College team: Georgetown Hoyas
- Club: Union Athletic Club

Amos Bartelsmeyer (born 25 July 1994) is a German middle and long-distance runner. He represented Germany at the 2019 World Athletics Championships and 2020 Summer Olympics competing in the men's 1500 metres.

He competed collegiately for the Georgetown Hoyas, where he was a seven-time All-American and won six Big East Conference titles. He now works as a volunteer assistant coach for the Washington Huskies, where he also trains full time.

== Personal bests ==
Outdoor

- 800 metres – 1:46.71 (Sacramento 2021)
- 1500 metres – 3:34.39 (Gresham 2023)
- Mile – 3:53.33 (London 2019)
- 5000 metres – 13:16.66 (Walnut 2023)

Indoor

- 600 metres – 1:20.99 (University Park 2018)
- 800 metres – 1:49.63 (New York 2015)
- 1000 metres – 2:22.75 (State College 2014)
- 1500 metres – 3:34.72 (Boston 2023)
- Mile – 3:50.45 (Boston 2023) NBP
- 3000 metres – 7:48.87 (Boston 2022)
- 5000 metres – 13:17.71 (Boston 2022)
