= 15K run =

Long-distance running competition

Athletics 15K run

World records
- Men: Jacob Kiplimo 40:07+ (2025)
- Women: Agnes Jebet Ngetich 44:15 (2024)

The 15K run, meaning 15 kilometres (9.3 mi), is a long-distance foot race. It is a rarely held race that is not recognized as an Olympic event. The overall world best time for men was 40:07, set by Jacob Kiplimo in 2025, en route to his world record of 56:42 in the Barcelona Half Marathon. Excluding en route times both the world best for men and women were set at the Zevenheuvelenloop in Nijmegen, Netherlands. The world best for men is held by Joshua Cheptegei of Uganda who ran a time of 41:05. The women's world best is held by Agnes Jebet Ngetich of Kenya who ran a time of 44:15.

Between 1985 and 1991, the IAAF World Women's Road Race Championships was contested over the 15 km distance.

== All-time top 25 ==
- + = en route to longer performance
- Mx = mixed gender race
- Wo = women only race

=== Men ===
- Correct as of September 2026.

Men's all-time top 25 of the 15K run
Rank	Time	Athlete	Nation	Date	Race	Place	Ref.
1	40:07+	Jacob Kiplimo	Uganda	16 February 2025	Barcelona Half Marathon	Barcelona	
2	40:39+	Yomif Kejelcha	Ethiopia	23 August 2026	21K Buenos Aires	Buenos Aires	
3	40:52+	Nicholas Kimeli	Kenya	8 March 2026	Lisbon Half Marathon	Lisbon	
4	40:56+	Daniel Mateiko	Kenya	27 October 2024	Valencia Half Marathon	Valencia	
5	40:57+	Isaia Kipkoech Lasoi	Kenya	27 October 2024	Valencia Half Marathon	Valencia	
6	40:59+	Kibiwott Kandie	Kenya	22 October 2023	Valencia Half Marathon	Valencia	
6	40:59+	Hagos Gebrhiwet	Ethiopia	22 October 2023	Valencia Half Marathon	Valencia	
6	40:59+	Selemon Barega	Ethiopia	22 October 2023	Valencia Half Marathon	Valencia	
9	41:05	Joshua Cheptegei	Uganda	18 November 2018	Zevenheuvelenloop	Nijmegen	
9	41:05+	Geoffrey Kamworor	Kenya	15 September 2019	Copenhagen Half Marathon	Copenhagen	
11	41:09+	Rodgers Kwemoi	Kenya	19 February 2022	Ras Al Khaimah Half Marathon	Ras Al Khaimah	
12	41:10+	Rhonex Kipruto	Kenya	6 December 2020	Valencia Half Marathon	Valencia	
13	41:11+	Alexander Mutiso	Kenya	6 December 2020	Valencia Half Marathon	Valencia	
13	41:11+	Philemon Kiplimo	Kenya	6 December 2020	Valencia Half Marathon	Valencia	
15	41:13	Leonard Komon	Kenya	21 November 2010	Zevenheuvelenloop	Nijmegen	
15	41:13+	Sabastian Sawe	Kenya	22 October 2023	Valencia Half Marathon	Valencia	
17	41:16+	Abel Kipchumba	Kenya	24 October 2021	Valencia Half Marathon	Valencia	
17	41:16+	Kennedy Kimutai	Kenya	24 October 2021	Valencia Half Marathon	Valencia	
19	41:17+	Mathew Kimeli	Kenya	24 October 2021	Valencia Half Marathon	Valencia	
20	41:18+	Muktar Edris	Ethiopia	24 October 2021	Valencia Half Marathon	Valencia	
20	41:18+	Amos Kurgat	Kenya	15 September 2024	Copenhagen Half Marathon	Copenhagen	
20	41:18+	Gilbert Kipkosgei Kiprotich	Kenya	8 March 2026	Lisbon Half Marathon	Lisbon	
23	41:20+	Gemechu Dida	Ethiopia	27 October 2024	Valencia Half Marathon	Valencia	
23	41:20+	Vincent Kibet Langat	Kenya	27 October 2024	Valencia Half Marathon	Valencia	
25	41:22+	Haile Gebrselassie	Ethiopia	4 September 2005		Tilburg	
25	41:22+	Kelvin Kiptum	Kenya	24 October 2021	Valencia Half Marathon	Valencia	

==== Notes ====
Below is a list of other times equal or superior to 41:22:

- Jacob Kiplimo also ran 40:27+ (2021), 40:42 (2024), 40:43+ (2022), 40:52+ (2026), 41:05 (2023), 41:11+ (2020) and 41:17+ (2024).
- Yomif Kejelcha also ran 40:57+ (2024), 41:01+ (2023).
- Hagos Gebrhiwet also ran 41:08+ (2026).
- Kibiwott Kandie also ran 41:10+ (2020), 41:16+ (2022).
- Rhonex Kipruto also ran 41:16+ (2021).
- Daniel Mateiko also ran 41:16+ (2021).
- Philemon Kiplimo also ran 41:16+ (2021).
- Joshua Cheptegei also ran 41:17 (2017). (Note: 41:16 by other sources)
- Sabastian Sawe also ran 41:17+ (2024).
- Isaia Kipkoech Lasoi also ran 41:17+ (2024).
- Selemon Barega also ran 41:20+ (2024).

=== Women ===
- Correct as of February 2026.

Women's all-time top 25 of the 15K run
Rank	Time	Athlete	Nation	Date	Race	Place	Ref.
1	44:15+ Mx	Agnes Jebet Ngetich	Kenya	27 October 2024	Valencia Half Marathon	Valencia	
2	44:20 Mx	Letesenbet Gidey	Ethiopia	17 November 2019	Zevenheuvelenloop	Nijmegen	
3	44:40+ Mx	Ejgayehu Taye	Ethiopia	27 October 2024	Valencia Half Marathon	Valencia	
4	44:45+ Mx	Fotyen Tesfay	Ethiopia	27 October 2024	Valencia Half Marathon	Valencia	
4	44:45+ Mx	Lilian Kasait	Kenya	27 October 2024	Valencia Half Marathon	Valencia	
6	44:52+ Mx	Yalemzerf Yehualaw	Ethiopia	24 October 2021	Valencia Half Marathon	Valencia	
6	44:52+ Mx	Sheila Chepkirui	Kenya	24 October 2021	Valencia Half Marathon	Valencia	
8	45:18+ Mx	Loice Chemnung	Kenya	15 February 2026	Barcelona Half Marathon	Barcelona	
9	45:27+ Mx	Joyciline Jepkosgei	Kenya	16 February 2025	Barcelona Half Marathon	Barcelona	
10	45:30+ Mx	Ruth Chepng'etich	Kenya	4 April 2021	Istanbul Half Marathon	Istanbul	
10	45:30+ Mx	Tsigie Gebreselama	Ethiopia	27 October 2024	Valencia Half Marathon	Valencia	
12	45:31+ Mx	Hellen Obiri	Kenya	4 April 2021	Istanbul Half Marathon	Istanbul	
13	45:36+ Mx	Senbere Teferi	Ethiopia	11 February 2024	Barcelona Half Marathon	Barcelona	
14	45:40+ Mx	Violah Jepchumba	Kenya	1 April 2017	Prague Half Marathon	Prague	
15	45:40+ Mx	Brigid Kosgei	Kenya	21 February 2020	Ras Al Khaimah Half Marathon	Emirate of Ras Al Khaimah	
16	45:41+ Mx	Ababel Yeshaneh	Ethiopia	21 February 2020	Ras Al Khaimah Half Marathon	Emirate of Ras Al Khaimah	
17	45:42+ Mx	Sutume Kebede	Ethiopia	14 January 2024	Houston Half Marathon	Houston	
18	45:45+ Mx	Joan Chelimo	Kenya	4 April 2021	Istanbul Half Marathon	Istanbul	
19	45:51+ Mx	Girmawit Gebrzihair	Ethiopia	19 February 2022	Ras Al Khaimah Half Marathon	Ras al-Khaimah	
20	45:56+ Mx	Likina Amebaw	Ethiopia	14 September 2025	Copenhagen Half Marathon	Copenhagen	
20	45:56+ Mx	Sharon Lokedi	Ethiopia	14 September 2025	Copenhagen Half Marathon	Copenhagen	
20	45:56+ Mx	Wede Kefale	Ethiopia	14 September 2025	Copenhagen Half Marathon	Copenhagen	
23	45:57+ Mx	Fancy Chemutai	Kenya	22 October 2017		Valencia	
24	46:00+	Catherine Reline Amanang'Ole	Kenya	19 February 2023	Barcelona Half Marathon	Barcelona	
25	46:01+	Irine Jepchumba Kimais	Kenya	19 February 2023	Barcelona Half Marathon	Barcelona	

==== Notes ====
Below is a list of other times equal or superior to 46:01:

- Letesenbet Gidey also ran 44:29+ (2021).
- Yalemzerf Yehualaw also ran 45:24+ Mx (2021), 45:27+ Mx (2022), 45:29+ Mx (2021).
- Fotyen Tesfay also ran 45:25+ Mx (2026).
- Joyciline Jepkosgei also ran 45:35+ Mx (2024), 45:37+ Mx (2017), 45:57+ (2017), 46:00+ (2023).
- Hellen Obiri also ran 45:39+ (2023), 45:47+ Mx (2024), 45:50+ Mx.
- Tsigie Gebreselama also ran 45:46+ Mx (2026).
- Sheila Chepkirui also ran 45:51+ Mx.
- Joan Chelimo also ran 45:54+ (2018).
- Brigid Kosgei also ran 45:59+ a (2019).
