= Laban Korir =

Kenyan long-distance runner

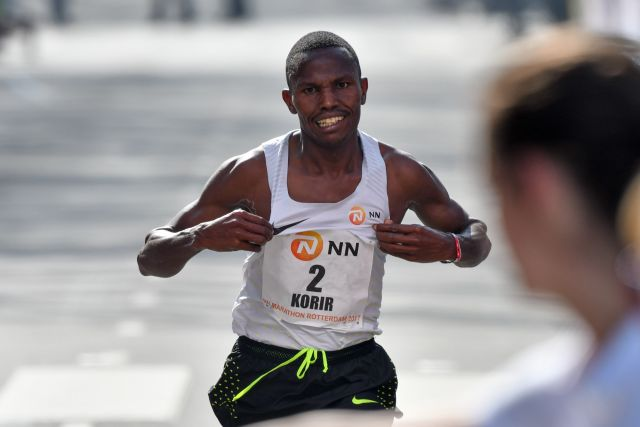
- Korir running at the 2017 Rotterdam Marathon

Personal information
- Full name: Laban Kipngetich Korir
- Nationality: Kenyan
- Born: 30 June 1985 (age 40)

Sport
- Country: Kenya
- Sport: Athletics
- Event: Long-distance running
- Team: NN Running Team

Laban Kipngetich Korir (born 30 June 1985 in Uasin Gishu District) is a Kenyan long-distance runner who competes in road running competitions. He is currently part of the NN Running Team, an international team of elite long-distance runners managed by Global Sports Communication in Nijmegen, Netherlands.

== Career ==
Laban Korir began competing abroad for the first time in 2008 in his early twenties. His first win came at the Setúbal Half Marathon in Portugal, and another followed at the 2009 Pombal Meia Maratona. Working with athletics manager Jos Hermens, he gained a place at the 2011 Amsterdam Marathon and made the third-fastest marathon debut in history with his run of 2:06:05 hours, which was enough for second place behind Wilson Chebet.

In his first race of 2012 he came fifth at the Roma-Ostia Half Marathon, but improved his best over the distance to a time of 1:00:38 hours. He was invited to the 2012 Boston Marathon and managed sixth place, although difficult running conditions left him with a slower time of 2:15:29 hours. A run at the 2012 Chicago Marathon saw him in contention up to the halfway point, but he faded into eleventh place by the finish.

Korir then won the 2014 Toronto Waterfront Marathon with a time of 2:08:15.

On 12 April 2015, he placed sixth at the Paris Marathon in 2:07:54. On 23 August, Korir won the Klagenfurt Half Marathon in Austria in a time of 1:01:52. On 18 October, he attempted to retain his title at the Toronto Waterfront Marathon, but finished third in 2:09:20.

On 3 April 2016, Korir headed back to Paris to compete in the Paris Marathon. He finished second in a time of 2:07:29 behind race winner, fellow Kenyan Cybrian Kotut who clocked 2:07:11. Laban's next marathon was on 16 October where he placed 4th in a new personal best time of 2:05:54 at the Amsterdam Marathon.

In 2017, he placed eighth at the Granollers Half Marathon in 1:03:54 on 5 February. On 9 April, Korir secured a podium finish at the Rotterdam Marathon placing third in a time of 2:06:24. His next race was on 20 August, at the Klagenfurt Half Marathon, where he placed third in 1:01:45. He returned to the Netherlands to compete at the Amsterdam Marathon on 15 October where he finished sixth in 2:07:01.

In 2018, Korir placed fourth at the Rotterdam Marathon in 2:05:58 on 8 April. He competed at the Klagenfurt Marathon on 26 August and finished third clocking 1:02:21. Korir returned to the Amsterdam Marathon, where on 21 October he placed sixth in 2:06:33.

In 2019, he competed at the Barcelona Marathon on 10 March, placing ninth in 2:09:36. The next month, Korir competed at the Hamburg Marathon placing 12th in 2:11:26 on 28 April. He represented Kenya in the men's marathon at the 2019 World Championships in Athletics alongside Kenyan teammates Geoffrey Kirui, Paul Lonyangata and Amos Kipruto. He competed in the men's marathon at the 2019 World Athletics Championships held in Doha, Qatar. He finished in 11th place. Laban recorded a time of 2:12:38.

Korir did not race in 2020.

In 2021, he lined up at the NN Mission Marathon in Enschede, Netherlands on 18 April. Despite starting with the lead pack, Korir dropped off the pace and eventually dropped out of the race. Fellow NN Running Team member Kenya's Eliud Kipchoge won the marathon.

Laban Korir is serving as president of the NN Running Team training camp in Kaptagat, Kenya. He works welcoming new athletes and important visitors. He says, "To be a president in the camp is sometimes very difficult, but above all you need to be honest, and show good self-discipline to the other athletes so that they can follow. You need to be a good example to others."

Some of Korir's training partners include Eliud Kipchoge, Philemon Rono and Geoffrey Kamworor.
