= DSM-Firmenich Running Team =

Dutch athletics team

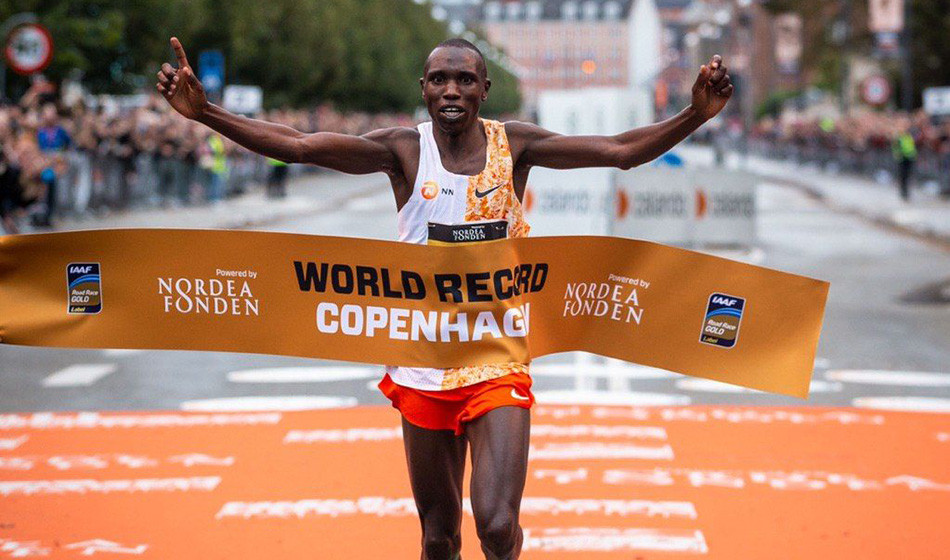
Geoffrey Kamworor of dsm-firmenich Running Team in 2019. Since its inception, members of the team set 16 world records and won 203 races including 13 World Marathon Majors (March 2022).

The DSM-Firmenich Running Team is a professional running team based in the Netherlands. It was founded in 2017 by Jos Hermens, the director of Global Sports Communication. Since 2026, the team's title sponsor is the Dutch/Swiss biotech and chemical company DSM-Firmenich. The previous title sponsor was the Dutch insurance company NN Group and was called "NN Running Team" at its inception. The running team includes some of the most accomplished distance runners in the world, including many Olympians. One of dsm-firmenich Running Team's training camps is located in Kaptagat, Kenya.

As of January 2023, the team consisted of over 70 athletes from eight countries, including 50 men and 20 women. Some of its most notable members are former marathon world record holder Eliud Kipchoge, Geoffrey Kamworor, Kenenisa Bekele, 5000m and 10000m world record holder Joshua Cheptegei, and half marathon world record holder Letesenbet Gidey. Since its inception, members of the team achieved (as of March 2022):

- 203 road race wins,
- 16 world records,
- 4 European records,
- 29 national records,
- 10 World Cup and Olympic Games medals,
- 13 World Marathon Majors victories,
- 14 silver/bronze medals in World Marathon Majors,
- 32 podium finishes in major (but not World Major) city marathons (Amsterdam, Valencia, Rotterdam, Paris, Hamburg).

== Members ==
As of 2025, NN Running Team members included:

Men

- Eliud Kipchoge (KEN)
- Joshua Cheptegei (UGA)
- Geoffrey Kamworor (KEN)
- Abdi Nageeye (NLD)
- Birhanu Legese (ETH)
- Marc Scott (GBR)
- Victor Kiplangat (UGA)
- Mohamed Esa (ETH)
- Daniel Mateiko (KEN)
- Maru Teferi (ISR)

Women

- Almaz Ayana (ETH)
- Degitu Azimeraw (ETH)
- Genzebe Dibaba (ETH)
- Letesenbet Gidey (ETH)
- Lonah Salpeter (ISR)
- Nienke Brinkman (NED)
- Yalemzerf Yehualaw (ETH)
- Sally Chepyego (KEN)

== Training camps ==
NN Running operates training camps in the following locations.

- Kaptagat, Kenya
- Iten, Kenya
- Kapkitony, Kenya
- Keringet, Kenya
- Kapchorwa, Uganda
- Addis Ababa, Ethiopia
- Sendafa, Ethiopia
- Asmara, Eritrea
- Johannesburg, South Africa

== Sponsorship ==
The running team's title sponsor is DSM-Firmenich. The title sponsorship was transferred from NN Group in January 2026, who remain a sponsor of the team. Other corporate sponsors include Nike, Huawei, and Abbott Laboratories.
