= Chepkorio =

- Location within Kenya
- Coordinates: 0.38°N 35.53°E
- Country: Kenya
- County: Elgeyo-Marakwet

Population
  - Total: 3,206
  - Density: 191/km^{2} (490/sq mi)
- Time zone: UTC+3 (EAT)

Chepkorio is a village in Kenya. It is located in Keiyo South Constituency, Elgeyo-Marakwet County. It lies on the B54 highway, to the northwest of Kaptagat. As of 2019, it was home to 3,206 residents.

It is the home village of professional long-distance runners Geoffrey Kamworor, and was the home of former men's marathon world record holder Kelvin Kiptum until his death.
