= Lily Partridge =

British long-distance runner

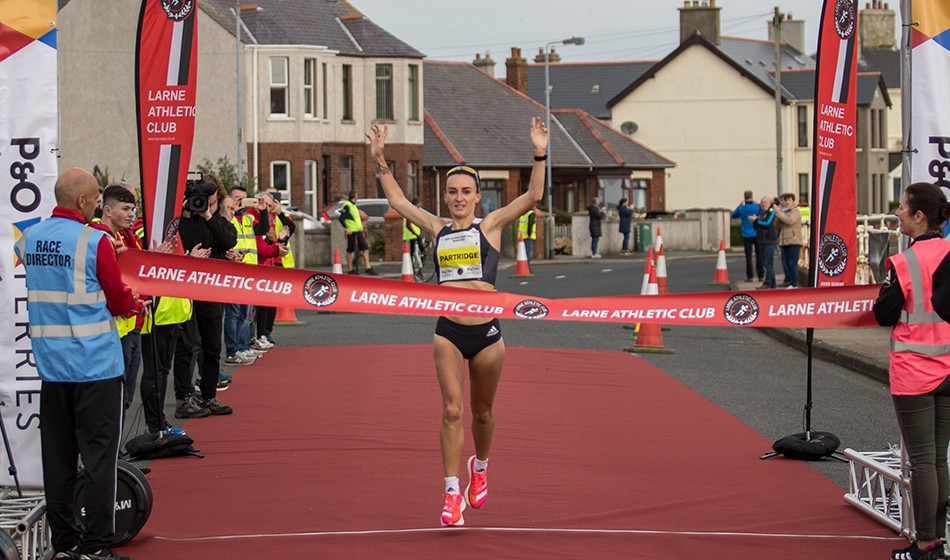
- Lily Partridge winning Antrim HM

Personal information
- Nationality: British
- Born: 9 March 1991 (age 35)
- Education: Weydon School; St Mary's University, Twickenham
- Spouse: Ben Connor

Sport
- Country: Great Britain
- Sport: Athletics/Running
- Turned pro: 2015
- Coached by: Alan Storey

Lily Partridge (born 9 March 1991) is a British long-distance runner.

== Major competition record ==
Year	Competition	Venue	Position	Event	Time	Source
2023	Copenhagen Half Marathon	Copenhagen, Denmark	10th	Half marathon	01:10:34	
2023	Valencia Marathon	Valencia, Spain	21st	Marathon	02:25:09	
2024	Trafford 10km	Trafford, Manchester, United Kingdom	2nd	10 km	00:31:29	
2017	Great North Run	Newcastle upon Tyne, United Kingdom	7th	Half marathon	01:12:10	
2018	London Marathon	London, United Kingdom	8th 1st Brit	Marathon	02:29:24	
2020	Antrim Coast Half Marathon	Larne, United Kingdom	1st	Half marathon	1:11:36	
2020	The Big Half	London, United Kingdom	1st	Half marathon	1:10:50	
