= Global Sports Communication =

Sports management company

- Company type: Private
- Industry: Sports management
- Founded: 1985 by Jos Hermens
- Headquarters: Nijmegen, Netherlands
- Key people: Jos Hermens (CEO)
- Website: Global Sports Communication

Global Sports Communication (GSC) is a sports management company based in Nijmegen, Netherlands. It primarily manages elite track-and-field athletes and distance runners, specializing in sprint events, middle-distance events, field events, and road races including the marathon. The company is currently managed by former Dutch Olympian Jos Hermens. Some of the most notable athletes that GSC manages include Faith Kipyegon, Sifan Hassan, Eliud Kipchoge, and Geoffrey Kamworor.

== History ==
Global Sports Communication was founded by sports manager and Dutch Olympian Jos Hermens in 1985. Hermens set two world records in the 1970s, and was a member of the 1972 and 1976 Dutch Olympic teams.

Hermens founded the company from his small apartment in the Netherlands after learning about sports management from working at Nike in the 1980s. Afterwards, it has grown to represent many of the world's best and most famous runners, including many Olympians. Global Sports Communication reports that its athletes have won 42 Olympic gold medals and set 92 world records. The company lists partners as NN Group, Nike, Ineos, Adidas, Maurten, Abbott, Coros, Shokz, Capital Sports, and Virtuoos.

== Athletes ==
Prominent track-and-field athletes, including many Olympians, who are currently being managed by Global Sports Communication include:

- Haile Gebrselassie (ETH) (long distance)
- Eliud Kipchoge (KEN) (long distance)
- Faith Kipyegon (KEN) (long distance)
- Sifan Hassan (NLD) (long distance)
- Joshua Cheptegei (UGA) (long distance)
- Beatrice Chepkoech (KEN) (steeplechase)
- Letesenbet Gidey (ETH) (long distance)
- Caterine Ibargüen (COL) (jumps)
- Geoffrey Kamworor (KEN) (long distance)
- Laura Weightman (UK) (long distance)
- Lieke Klaver (NED) (sprints)
- Birhanu Legese (ETH) (long distance)
- Halimah Nakaayi (UGA) (middle distance)
- Lijiao Gong (CHN) (throws)
- Abdi Nageeye (NED) (long distance)
- N'ketia Seedo (NED) (sprints)
- Nienke Brinkman (NED) (long distance)
- Harrie Lavreysen (NED) (track cycling)
- Peruth Chemutai (UGA) (steeplechase)
- Yalemzerf Yehualaw (ETH) (long distance)
- Jessica Schilder (NED) (throws)
- Degitu Azimeraw (ETH) (long distance)
- Faith Cherotich (KEN) (steeplechase)

Other current or former athletes include: Almaz Ayana, Zheng Wang, Liu Hong, Hyvin Kiyeng, Wenxiu Zhang, Sunette Viljoen, Luvo Manyonga, Orlando Ortega, Zelin Cai, Dong Bin, Lu Xiuzhi, Kenenisa Bekele, Gabriela Szabo, Paul Chelimo, Liu Shiying, Terrence Agard, Bin Feng, Ronald Kwemoi, Djamel Sedjati, Jiayuan Song, Jie Zhao, Morgan Pearson, and Isaac Makwala.

== NN Running Team ==
Global Sports Communication currently manages NN Running Team, an elite running team that includes some of the world's most famous runners. The team has a high-altitude training camp in Kaptagat, Kenya.
