= Antrim Coast Half Marathon =

Annual running race in Northern Ireland

- Date: last weekend of August (Bank Holiday Weekend)
- Location: Larne, County Antrim, Northern Ireland
- Event type: Road
- Distance: Half marathon
- Primary sponsor: Condor Executive
- Established: 2020
- Course records: Men's: 58:36 (2023) (Kenya) Daniel Mateiko; Women's: 1:03:44 (2021) (Ethiopia) Yalemzerf Yehualaw
- Website: Official website

Antrim Coast Half Marathon is an annual international half marathon competition which is contested every August in Larne, Northern Ireland. It is one of two half marathons within UK & Ireland which carries World Athletics 'Elite' Label Road Race status.

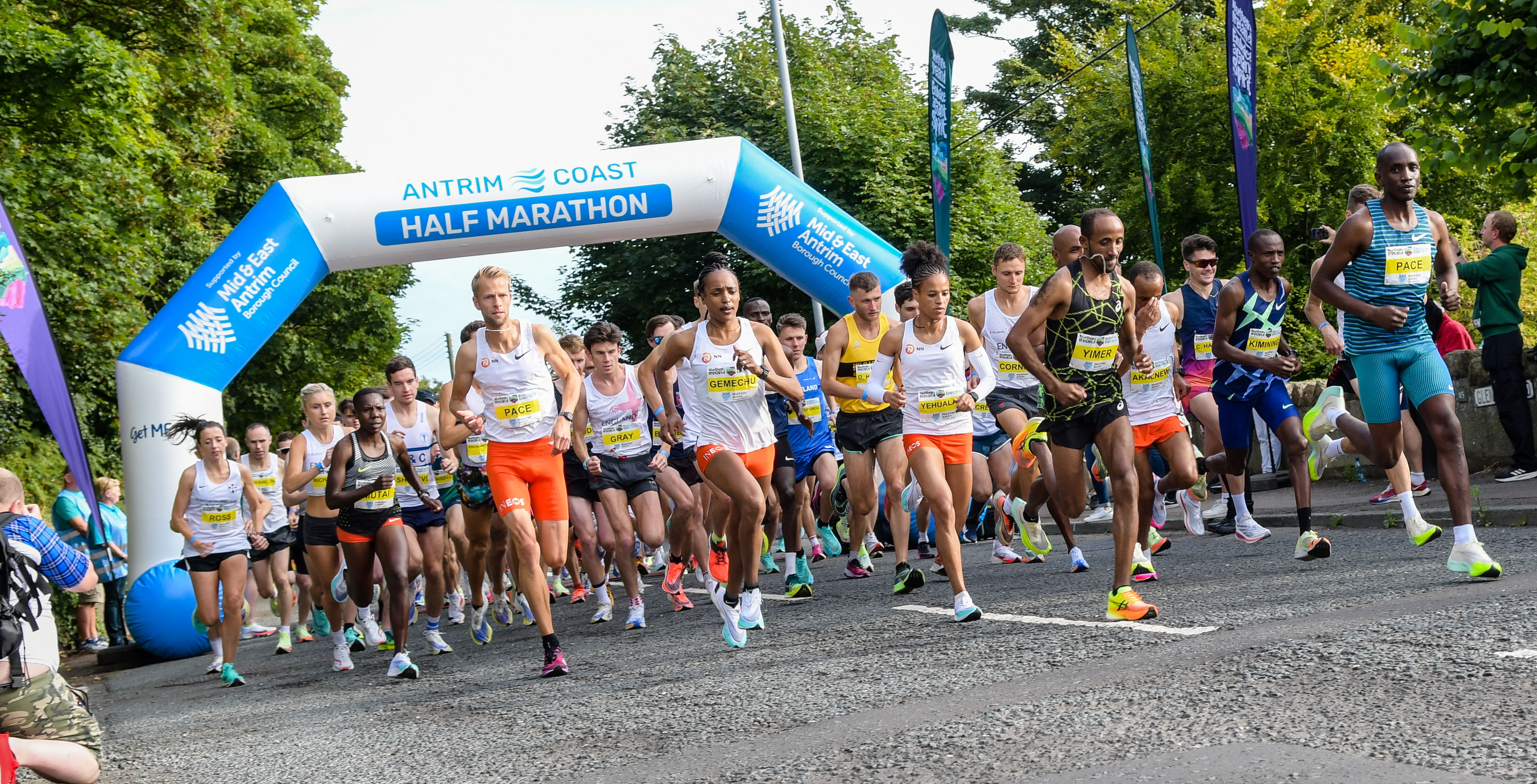
Antrim Coast Half Marathon (Elite Start)

Ethiopian runners have been successful in the competition, accounting for winning both the 2021 and 2022 men's and women's editions. The women's course record of 1 hr 04 min 22 sec was set by Yalemzerf Yehualaw in 2022, which is the current UK & Ireland All comers record for the half marathon distance. Yehualaw broke the world record in 2021 in a time of 1 hr 03 min 44 sec becoming the first women in history to break the 1 hr 04-minute barrier, only for the time to be unratified due to the course measurement being 54 metres short.

The men’s course record of 58 min 36 sec was set by Daniel Mateiko of Kenya in 2023, which is the current UK & Ireland All comers record for the half marathon distance.

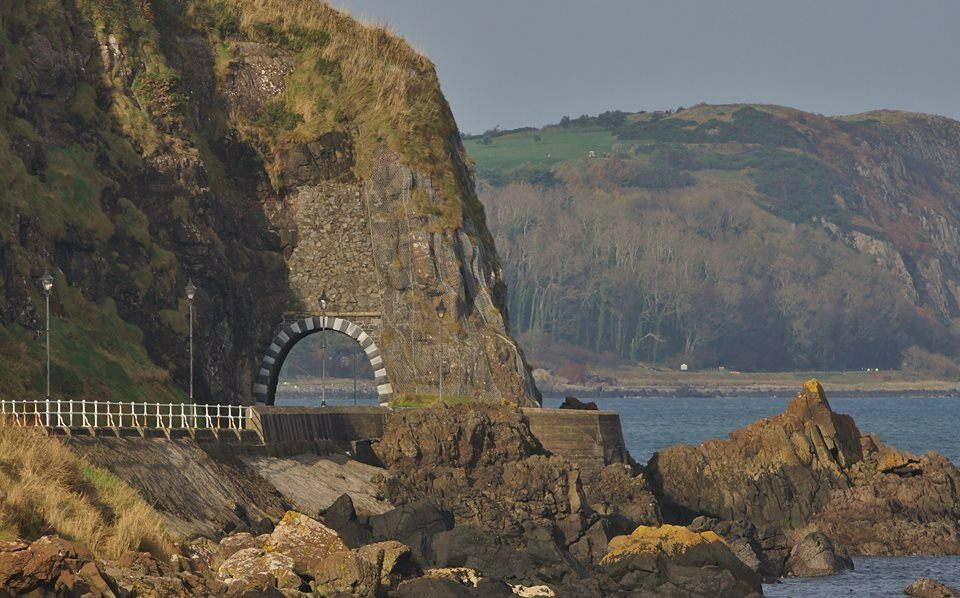
Black Arch

The Elite and Mass race start on the Antrim Coast Road, which was designed and built by designer William Bald completed in 1842.

== History ==
First held in 2020, the inaugural event was a UK & Ireland domestic only race due to travel restrictions during the Covid pandemic. The Men's 2020 event was won by Sir Mo Farah in a time of 1 hr 00 min 27 sec, with 3 UK men running under 1 hr 01 minutes for the first time ever, making it the fastest domestic half marathon in the UK.

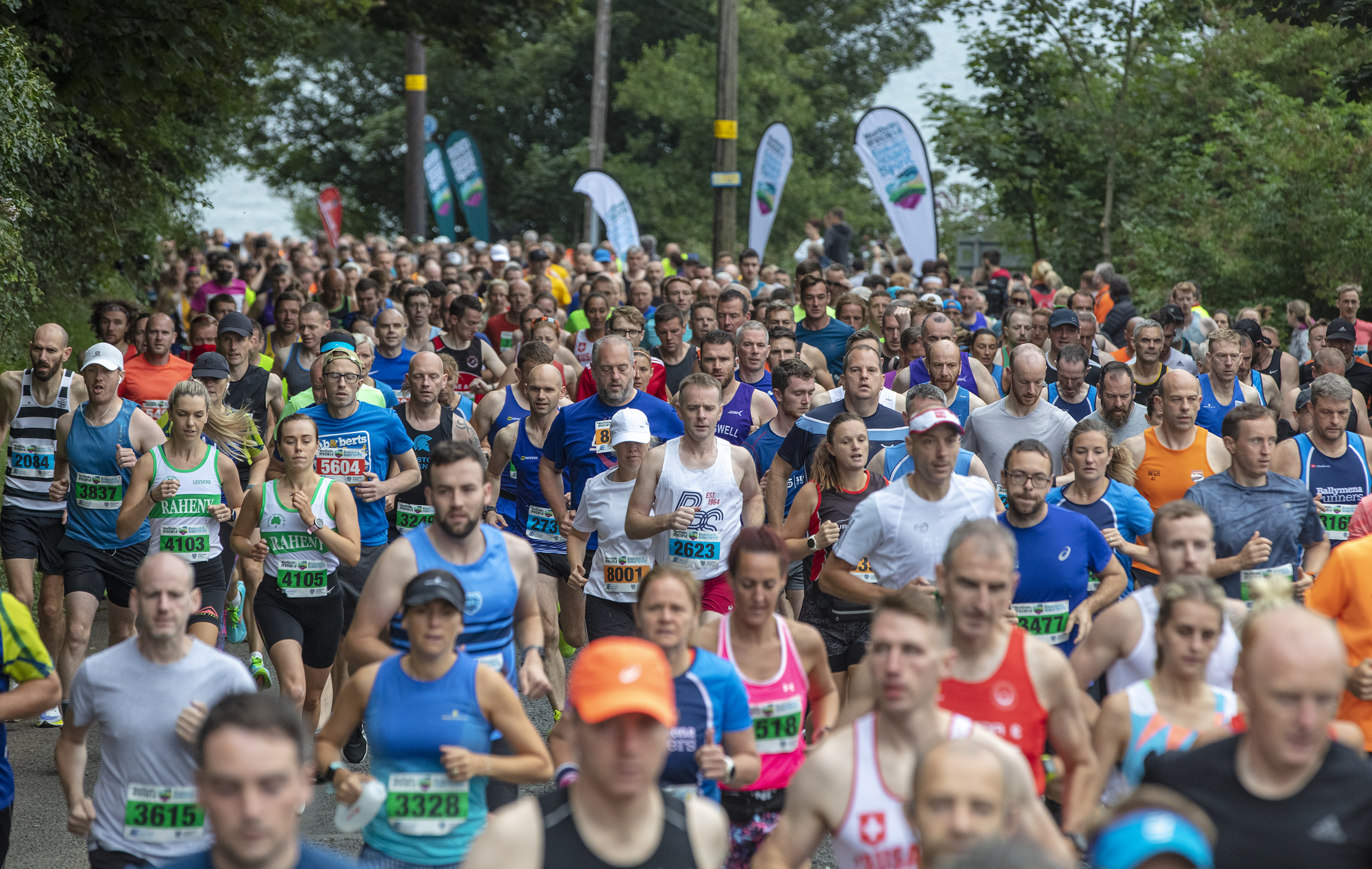
Mass Race Start

The 2020 Women’s event was won by Lily Partridge in a time of time of 1 hr 11 min 36 sec, with 4 women running under 1 hr 13 minutes. The event has delivered fast times mainly due to the course elevation being just inside the legal tolerance with a decrease of – 19 metres over the course distance of 13.1 miles.

The race begins on the Antrim Coast road, running into Larne harbour and town before moving back onto the Antrim Coast road, running out to the turning point at Ballygally village before returning on the Coast road and finishing at the Chaime Memorial Tower.

The event also hosts a children's race named Condor Executive Kid's mile and Condor Executive Street Mile for adults. The five times Olympian and former European Champion Jo Pavey and six-time World Cross Country Silver medallist and European Champion Catherina McKiernan have acted as ambassadors for the children's race.

== Past Winners ==
Year	Men	Time	Women	Time
2020	Mo Farah (GBR)	1:00:27	Lily Partridge (GBR)	1:11:36
2021	Jemal Yimer (ETH)	1:00:30	Yalemzerf Yehualaw (ETH)	1:03:44
2022	Jemal Yimer (ETH)	59:04	Yalemzerf Yehualaw (ETH)	1:04:22
2023	Daniel Mateiko (KEN)	58:36	Mestawut Fikir (ETH)	1:06:44
2024	Alex Matata (KEN)	59:46	Yalemzerf Yehualaw (ETH)	1:05:31
2025	Geoffrey Kamworor (KEN)	59:51	Mizan Alem (ETH)	1:05:38
2026	Isaia Kipkoech Lasoi (KEN)	58:26	Girmawit Gebrzihair (ETH)	1:06:12

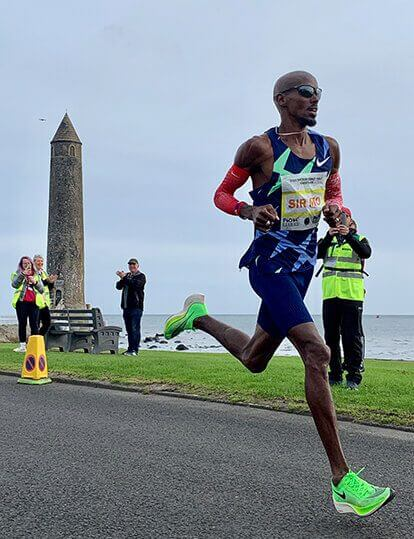
Sir Mo Farah (2020)

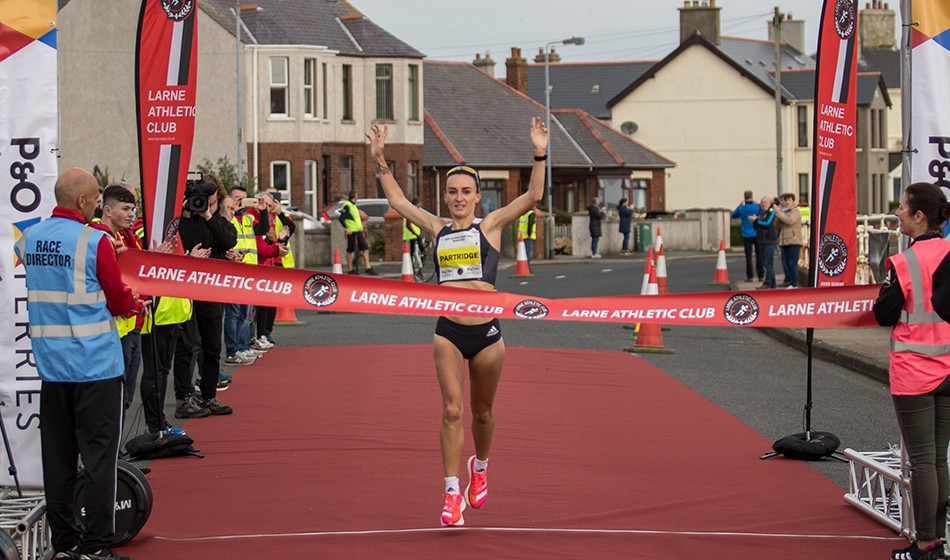
Lily Partridge (2020)

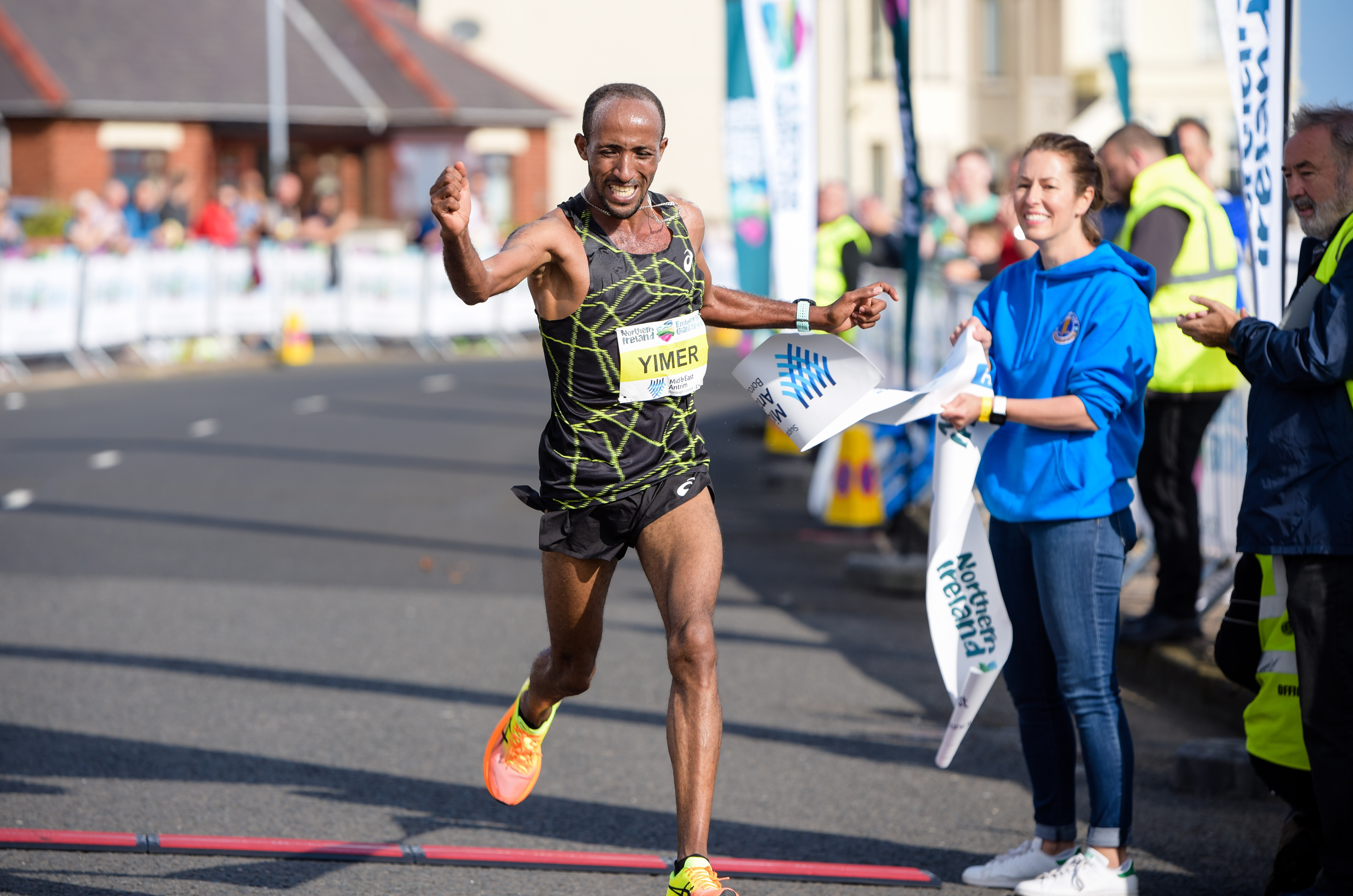
Jemal Yimer (2021, 2022)

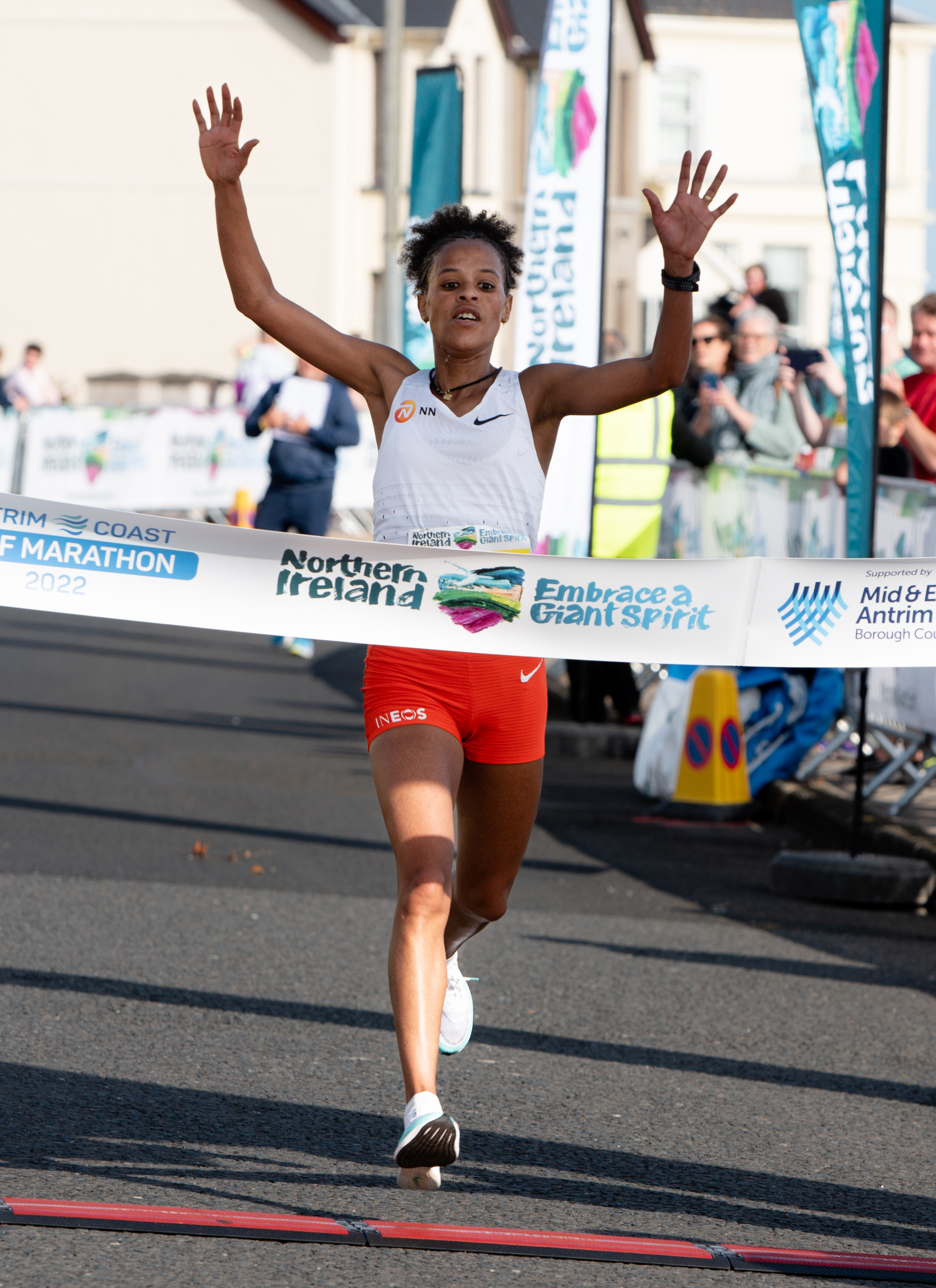
Yalemzerf Yehualaw (2021, 2022)
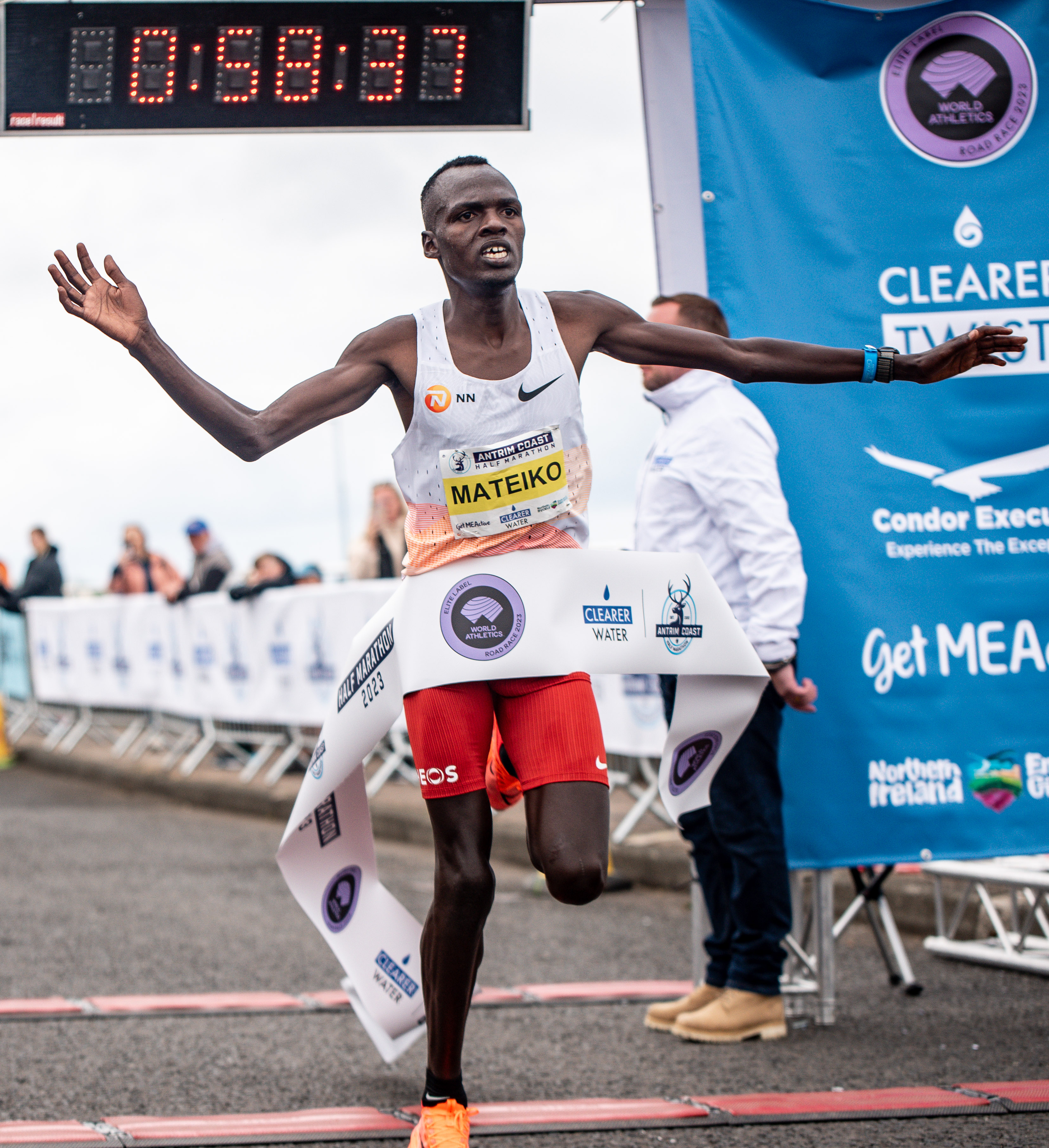
Daniel Mateiko (2023)

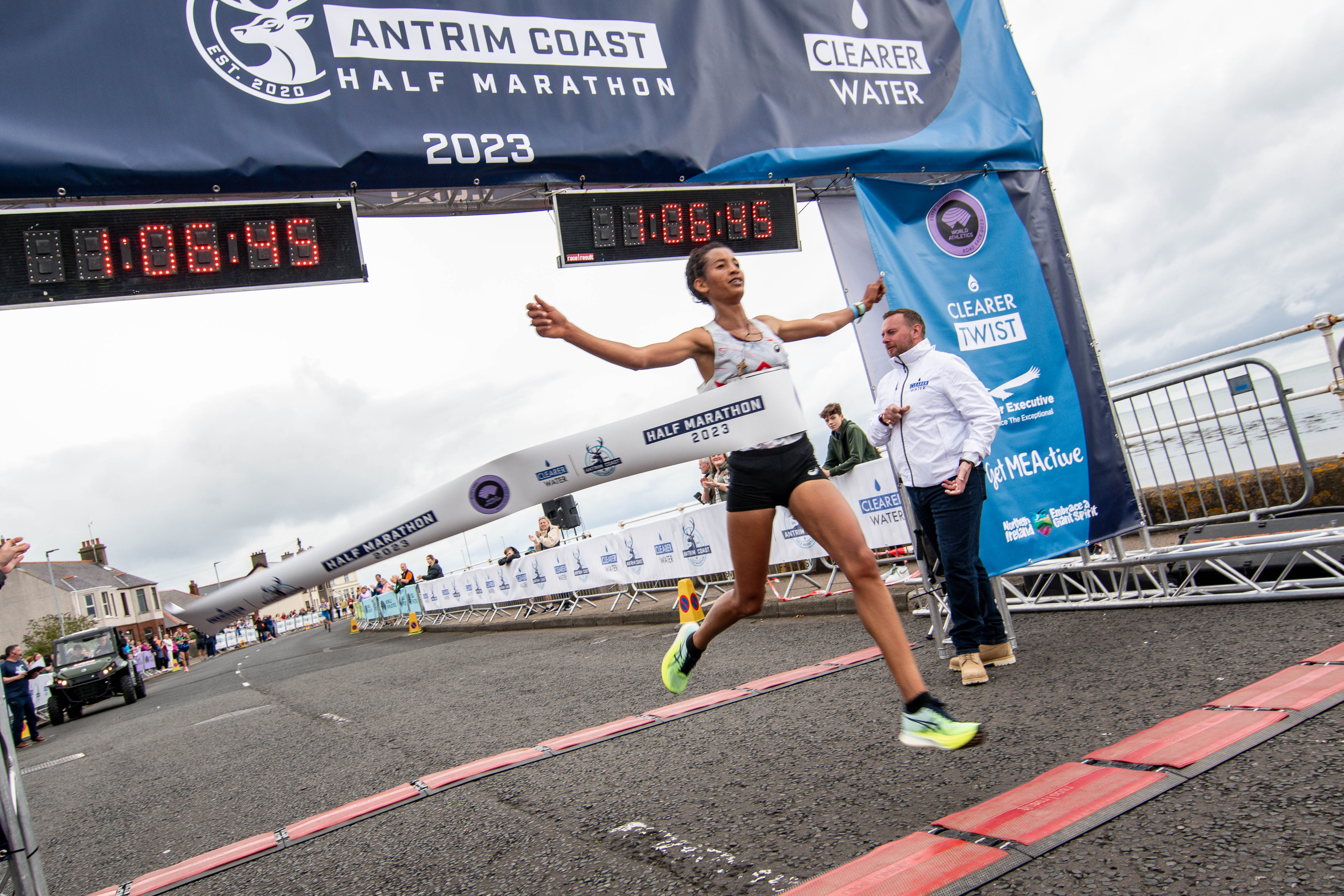
Mestawut Fikir (2023)

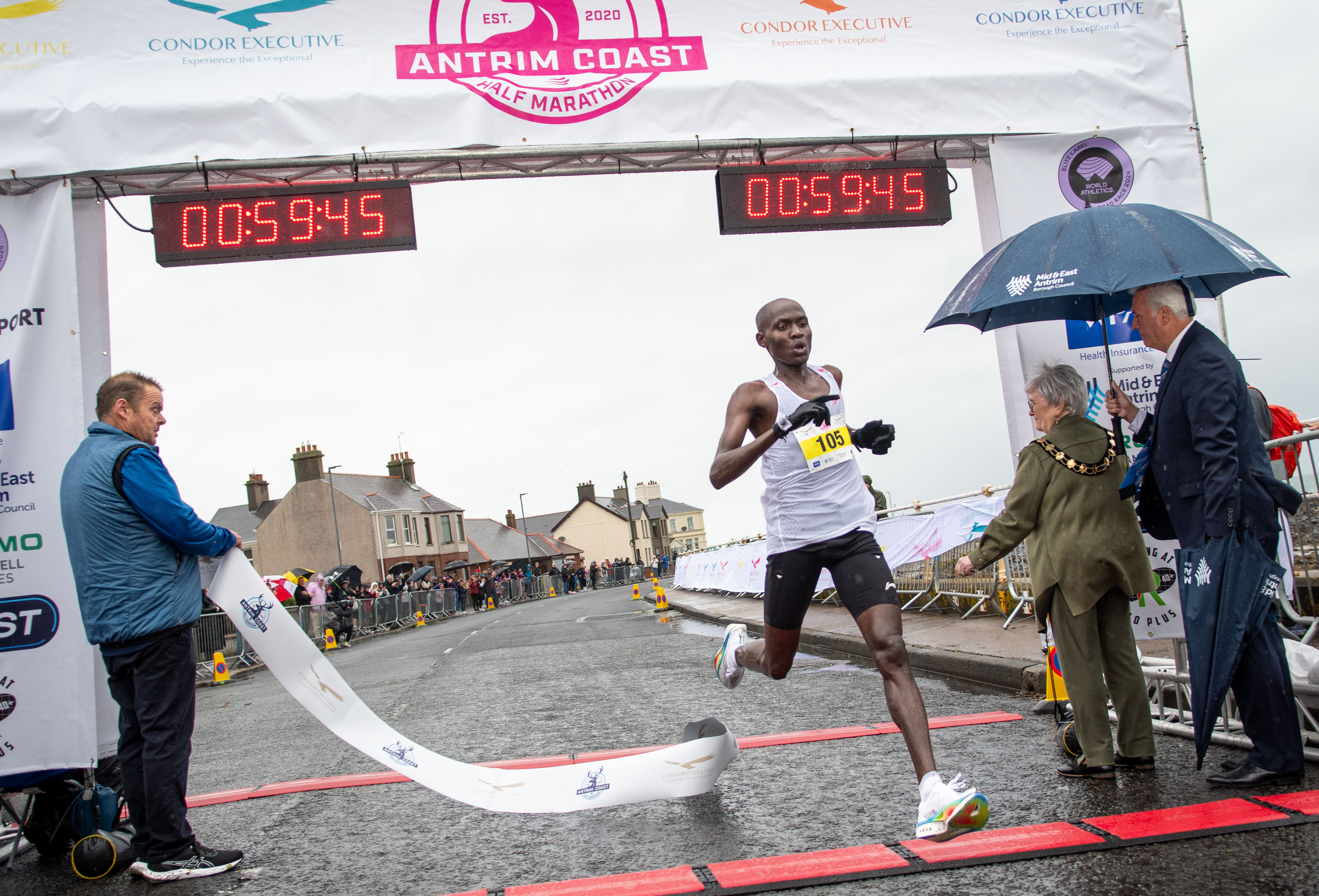
Alex Nzioka Matata (2024)

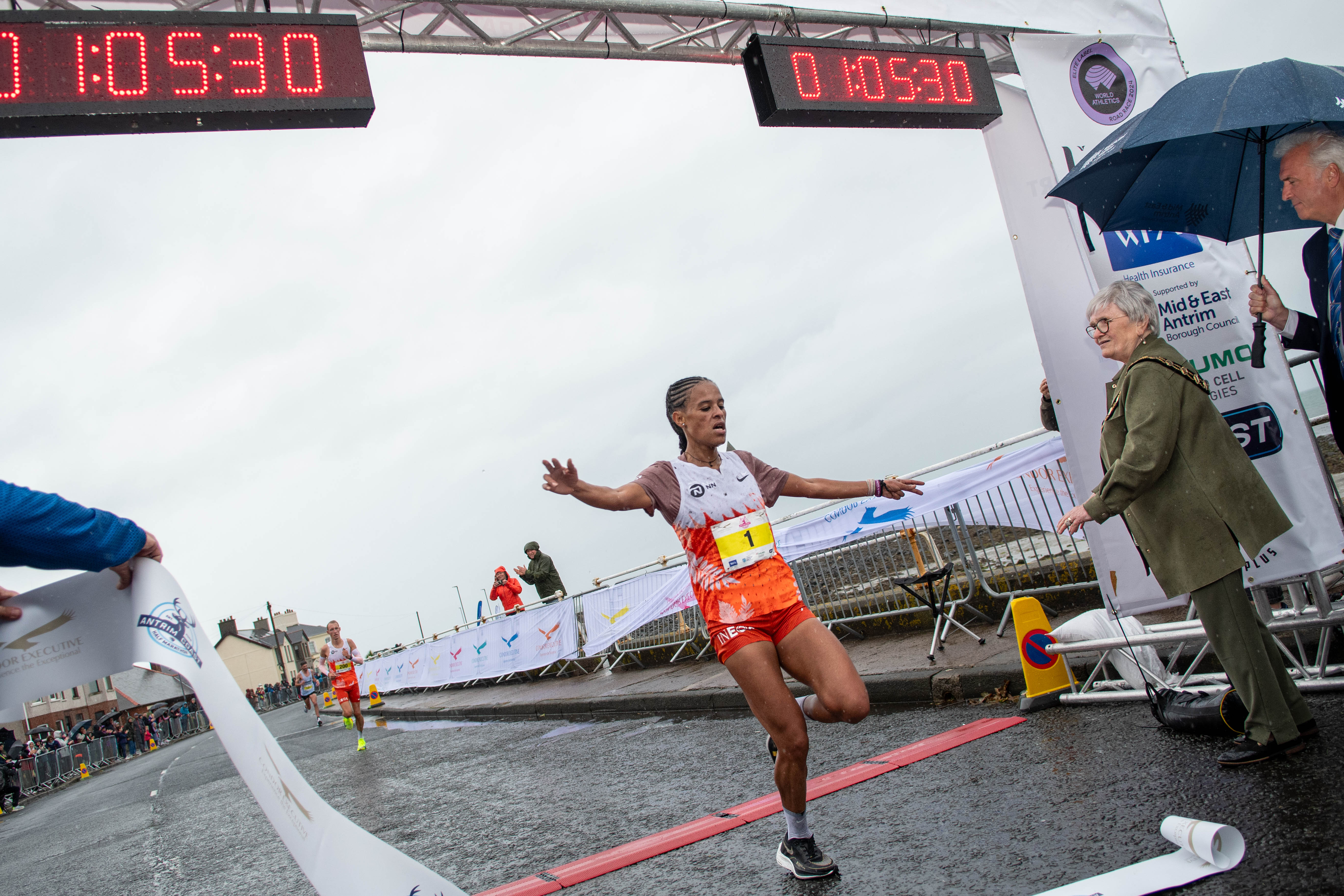
Yalemzerf Yehualaw (2024)

== Iconic Landmarks ==
- Halloran’s Castle (Ballygally)- 12th Century castle

- Ballygally Castle – Built by James Shaw in 1625, now part of the Hastings Hotel Group

- Battle of Larne Lough – location of last Viking Battle in Ireland (Conor of Ireland drove out Jarl Einar Wry – Mouth Orkney Vikings 1018

- Olderfleet Castle – Edward Bruce landing May 1315

- Black Arch – Built by William Bald 1842

- Chaine Memorial Tower – James Chaine MP

- Ballygally backdrop – Game of thrones location sites
