= Daniel Mateiko =

Kenyan long-distance runner (born 1998)

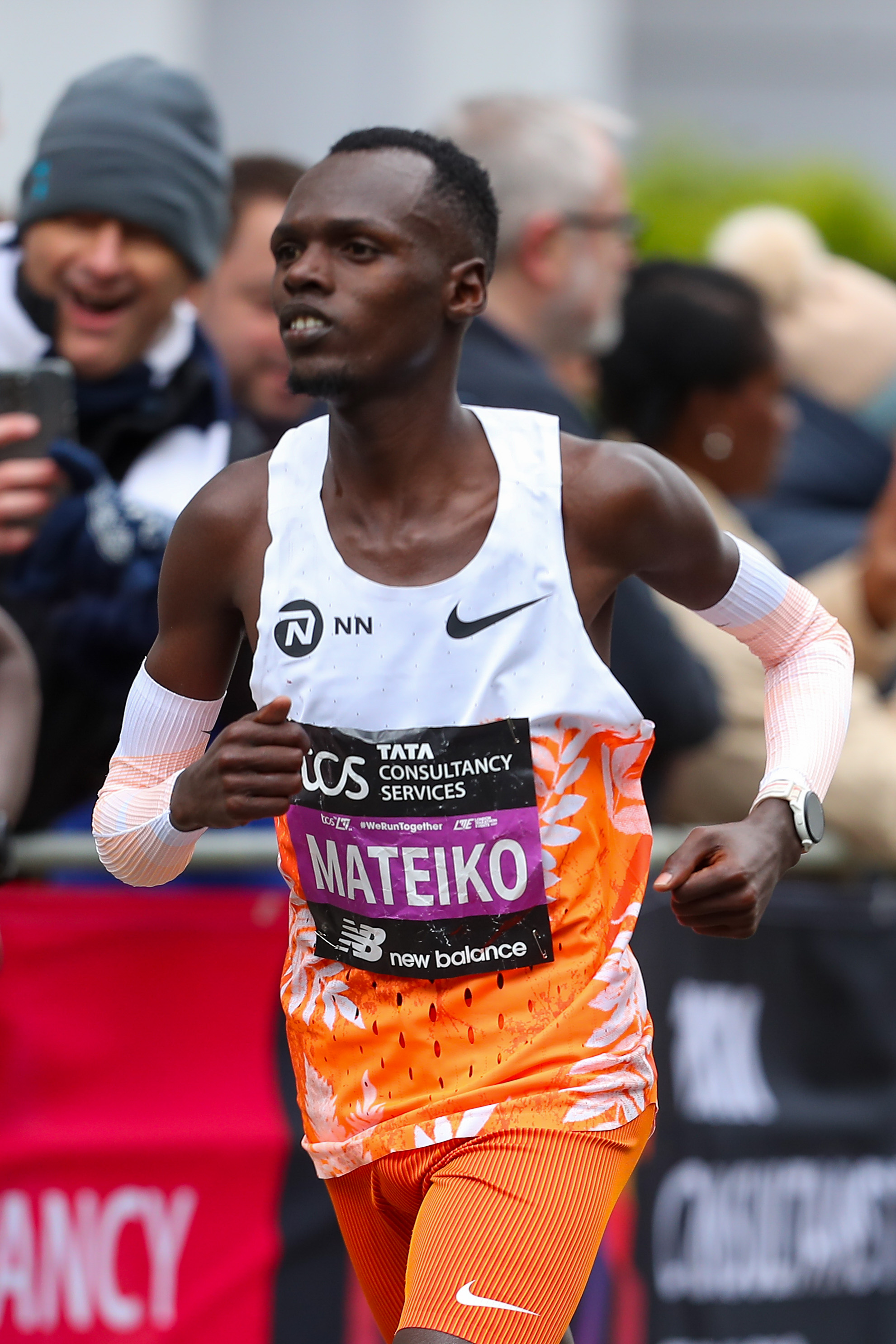

Personal information
- Born: 4 August 1998 (age 27) Mount Elgon District, Bungoma County, Kenya

Sport
- Country: Kenya
- Sport: Athletics
- Event: Long-distance running

Daniel Mateiko (born 4 August 1998) is a Kenyan long-distance runner and member of the DSM-Firmenich Running Team. He has raced mainly between 5000m and half marathon and holds a 58:26 half marathon personal best which makes him the 9th fastest of all time over that distance.

== Career ==
=== 2019-2020 ===
Daniel Mateiko began competing on the track primarily at 5000m. On 21 August 2019 he finished 5th at the Kenyan Championships in Nairobi. 2020 saw Mateiko win the Eldama Ravine Half Marathon in Eldama Ravine, Kenya.

=== 2021 ===
Daniel Mateiko began 2021 competing on the track in 10000m. On 8 June as an invited athlete at the Ethiopian Trials in Hengelo, he raced internationally for the first time, and placed 6th in a personal best of 27:03:94. Mateiko then went to the Kenyan Olympic Trials, and placed 5th in a race won by his NN Running Team training partner Geoffrey Kamworor. Mateiko then moved to the roads and contested two half marathons. First, he placed 3rd at the Copenhagen Half Marathon in 59:25. Then over a month later on 24 October, Mateiko placed 3rd at the Valencia Half Marathon in a personal best and top-10 all-time performer time of 58:26.

=== 2022 ===
Daniel Mateiko started his 2022 racing campaign on the roads and at the Ras al Khaimah Half Marathon on 19 February he placed 6th in 58:45. Mateiko then raced at the Istanbul Half Marathon on 27 March where he finished 2nd in 1:00:05. His compatriot Rodgers Kwemoi won the race. Mateiko then competed on the track and in his season opener at 5000m at the Kip Keino Classic in Nairobi he again was runner-up clocking a new PB of 13:13.45 behind race winner Jacob Krop.

=== 2023 ===
In August 2023 Mateiko won the 2023 edition of the Antrim Coast Half Marathon, with a world leading time of 58:36, breaking the UK and Irish all-comers' record.

=== 2025 ===
In April 2025, Mateiko participated in the 2025 Boston Marathon where he finished in the 9th position in a time of 2:07:52

== Personal bests ==
Outdoor

Event	Time	Date	Place
5000 m	13:13.45	7 May 2022	Nairobi
10000 m	26:50.81	25 May 2024	Eugene
10k	29:03	24 November 2019	Eldoret
Half Marathon	58:17	27 October 2024	Valencia
Marathon	2:03:44	1 March 2026	Tokyo
