= Gilbert Kipkosgei Kiprotich =

Kenyan long-distance runner

Personal information
- Born: 12 May 2000 (age 26)

Sport
- Country: Kenya
- Sport: Long-distance running
- Event: Half Marathon

Achievements and titles
- Personal best: Half Marathon: 58:27 (Málaga 2025)

Gilbert Kipkosgei Kiprotich (born 12 May 2000) is a Kenyan long-distance runner.

Kipkosgei Kiprotich in the 2025 Málaga Half Marathon champion, the Accra 2025 KGL Millennium Marathon champion in the 21K, and the 2025 Kenyan Athletics Championships champion at the 5000 metres.
