= Kelvin Kiptum =

Kenyan long-distance runner (1999–2024)

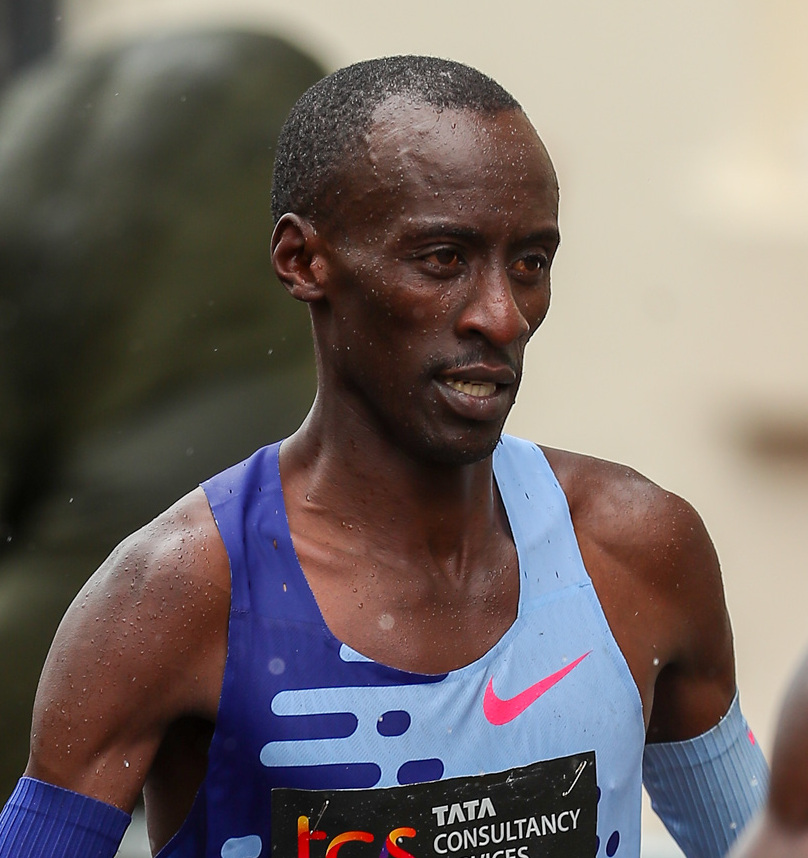
- Kiptum at the 2023 London Marathon

Personal information
- Full name: Kelvin Kiptum Cheruiyot
- Born: 2 December 1999 Chepsamo, Chepkorio, Kenya
- Died: 11 February 2024 (aged 24) Kaptagat, Kenya
- Height: 1.80 m (5 ft 11 in)
- Weight: 65 kg (143 lb)
- Spouse: Asenath Cheruto Rotich
- Children: 2

Sport
- Country: Kenya
- Sport: Athletics
- Event: Long-distance running
- Coached by: Gervais Hakizimana (2023–2024)

Achievements and titles
- Highest world ranking: 1st (Marathon, 2023)
- Personal best: Marathon: 2:00:35 (Chicago 2023)
Medal record
Men's athletics
Representing Kenya
World Marathon Majors
| Gold medal – first place | 2023 London | Marathon |
| Gold medal – first place | 2023 Chicago | Marathon |

Kelvin Kiptum Cheruiyot (2 December 1999 – 11 February 2024) was a Kenyan long-distance runner who held the marathon world record between 2023 and 2026. As of 2026, he still held two of the six fastest times running marathons in history, and was ranked first among the world's men's marathon runners at the time of his death.

Kiptum won all three marathons he ran including two top-tier World Marathon Majors (WMM) between December 2022 and October 2023. His times were three of the seven fastest marathon times, setting a course record of less than 2 hours 2 minutes in each race.

Kiptum ran the fastest-ever marathon debut at the 2022 Valencia Marathon, becoming only the third man in history to break two hours and two minutes and at the time set the fourth quickest time ever. In April 2023 he ran the second-fastest marathon in history at 2:01:25, 16 seconds outside the world record, at the 2023 London Marathon (WMM). At the 2023 Chicago Marathon, he broke the world record by 34 seconds with a time of 2:00:35, a mark ratified on 6 February 2024—five days before his death—by the international track federation World Athletics.

Kiptum and his coach died in a car crash on 11 February 2024 in Kaptagat, a settlement in rural Kenya used as a training place for long-distance runners. Local police said that Kiptum lost control of his vehicle and veered off the road, hitting a tree.

== Early life ==
Kelvin Kiptum was born on 2 December 1999. (Note: In 2024, LetsRun.com reported that Kiptum once said he was actually born in 1996, noting that he had a 7-year-old son at the time of his death.) He grew up in Chepsamo village in Marakwet District, Chepkorio, a high-altitude (~2,600 m) area in Elgeyo-Marakwet County of Kenya's Rift Valley.

He was the only child of Samson Cheruiyot and Mary Kangongo. As a young boy, he herded his family's cattle and began following other barefoot runners along the forest trails. Kiptum started training around 2013, when he was 13 years old.

== Career ==
In 2013, at the age of 13, Kiptum finished 10th in his first half marathon, the Family Bank Eldoret Half Marathon in Kenya. In 2014, he finished 12th; in 2018, he finished first, self-coached at the time. In March 2019, Kiptum participated in his first international race, the Lisbon Half Marathon, finishing fifth with a new personal record (59:54). He participated in six other races that year, touring north and west Europe, and won the Kass Half Marathon in Kenya in November. In 2020, Kiptum started working with Rwandan 3000 metres steeplechase record holder Gervais Hakizimana as a coach, although Kiptum supposedly had periodically trained alongside other youths with him since 2013. Since about 2020, he was already preparing for the marathon. In December of that year, the then-21-year-old set a significant personal best in the Spanish Valencia Half Marathon at 58:42, placing sixth. In 2021, he ran 59:35 and 59:02 half marathons in Lens, Pas-de-Calais (placing first) and Valencia again (placing eighth), respectively.

In December, 23-year-old Kiptum pulled off an upset when debuting in the classic 42.195 km distance at the Valencia Marathon. Running with a negative split, he took the victory with the fourth-fastest time ever of 2:01:53, becoming the third man in history to break two hours and two minutes. Only his compatriot and then-world record holder Eliud Kipchoge and Ethiopia's Kenenisa Bekele had run faster up to that point. Kiptum set the quickest second half in marathon history with a time of 60:15 (including 14:00 from 30–35k and 28:05 between 30–40k). His winning time was by far the fastest marathon debut in history, smashing the course record by over a minute. He also beat the runner-up by more than a minute and the 2022 world marathon champion Tamirat Tola, the pre-race favourite, among others.

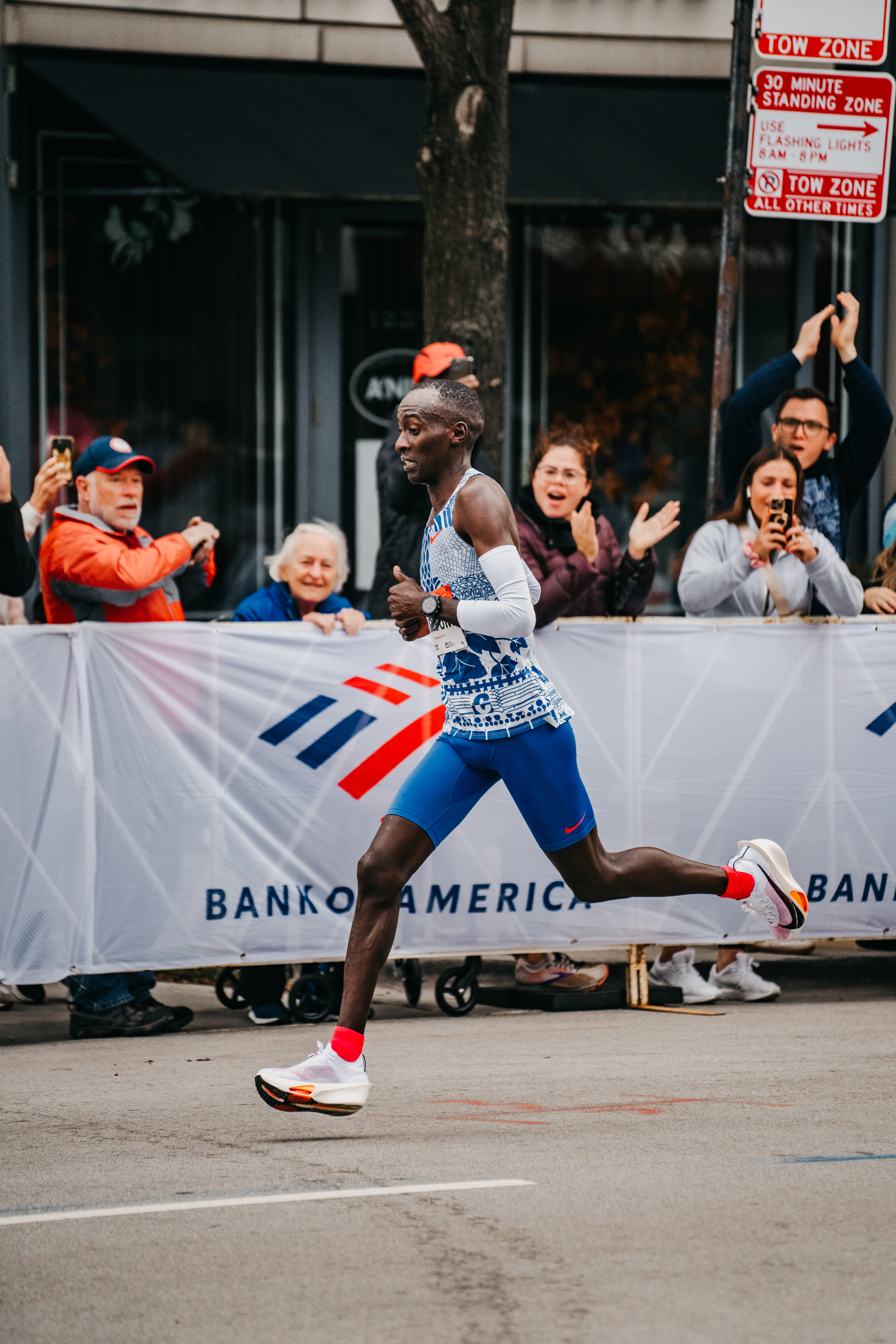
Setting the world record at the Chicago Marathon in 2023

In April 2023, Kiptum set the course record at the London Marathon (2:01:25), only 16 seconds slower than the world record at the time and 72 seconds faster than Kipchoge's course record (2:02:37).

His following race, which was his third marathon and second World Marathon Major, was the Chicago Marathon on 8 October 2023, when he was still aged 23. Kiptum set a new world record with a time of two hours and 35 seconds, slicing 34 seconds off Kipchoge's standard set at the 2022 Berlin Marathon, and surpassing the course record by more than three minutes. Kiptum negative split again, but this time the first half was covered in 60:48, almost a minute faster than his performance in London (though still 14 seconds behind the world record pace), and he had the stamina to run his second half at 59:47—only two seconds slower than in London, where he set the quickest half in a marathon. As in Valencia and London, the Kenyan made his trademark move roughly near the 30K checkpoint. After the 29th kilometre in a fast 2:35, he clocked a record 13:35 from 32–37k at a swift 2:43 min/km pace (22.09 km/h). Thus, Kiptum averaged 2:51 min/km pace for the entire distance (20.995 km/h). He ran at the front after the 15K checkpoint, without a pacemaker after halfway, and alone from 30th kilometre onward, beating the runner-up—his compatriot Benson Kipruto—by almost three and a half minutes. (Note: As of October 2023, there were two faster marathon marks in history, albeit both achieved in overassisted closed time trials and not in an open competition, thus ineligible to be ratified as a world record. Kiptum's compatriot Eliud Kipchoge ran 2:00:25 at the Breaking2 trial in 2017 and 1:59:40.2 at the Ineos 1:59 Challenge in 2019. Both events were not conducted under the rules of the IAAF, a governing body for the sport of athletics, due to the lack of open competition, the presence of interchangeable pacemakers and delivery of hydration on a bicycle, among others. Both races made use of a large number of rotating pacemakers, 30 in the first and 35 in the second attempt, who in smaller groups (6-pacer triangle formation and 7-pacer inverse-V formation, respectively) took turns fresh-footed during each race.)

Split times Kiptum VS Kipchoge's WR times
| | Kiptum's World Record Chicago, 8 October 2023 | | Kipchoge's Former World Record Berlin, 25 September 2022 | |
| Distance | Split | Time | Split | Time |
|---|---|---|---|---|
| 5 km | 14:26 | 14:26 | 14:14 | 14:14 |
| 10 km | 14:16 | 28:42 | 14:09 | 28:23 |
| 15 km | 14:27 | 43:09 | 14:10 | 42:33 |
| 20 km | 14:30 | 57:39 | 14:12 | 56:45 |
| Half | (3:09) | 1:00:48 | (3:06) | 59:51 |
| 25 km | 14:25 | 1:12:04 | 14:23 | 1:11:08 |
| 30 km | 14:27 | 1:26:31 | 14:32 | 1:25:40 |
| 35 km | 13:51 | 1:40:22 | 14:30 | 1:40:10 |
| 40 km | 14:01 | 1:54:23 | 14:43 | 1:54:53 |
| Marathon | (6:12) | 2:00:35 | (6:16) | 2:01:09 |

== Training regimen ==
Following Kiptum's record-breaking performance in October 2023, his coach provided insight on the athlete's training regimen. Gervais Hakizimana stated that Kiptum logged 250 to 280 km (160 to 170 mi) per week in the lead-up to that year's London Marathon in April. His routine regularly featured daily morning runs spanning 25–28 km, track or fartlek workouts on Tuesdays and Saturdays, and intense long runs of 30–40 km at close to marathon pace on Thursdays and Sundays. He trained alternately in the high-altitude areas of Chepkorio and the nearby Kerio Valley (800–1,200 m) before the Chicago Marathon.

== Personal life ==
Kiptum was married to Asenath Cheruto Rotich, with whom he had two children.

== Death ==
On 11 February 2024, Kiptum and his coach Gervais Hakizimana died at 11:00 p.m. (23:00) in a car crash near Kaptagat. Local police stated that Kiptum lost control of his car and veered off the road, before entering a ditch and colliding with a tree. Four men who had visited him that day about a contract for running shoes were subsequently detained for questioning concerning Kiptum's death.

World Athletics president Sebastian Coe remarked: "On behalf of all World Athletics, we send our deepest condolences to their families, friends, teammates and the Kenyan nation. It was only earlier this week in Chicago, the place where Kelvin set his extraordinary marathon world record, that I was able to officially ratify his historic time. An incredible athlete leaving an incredible legacy, we will miss him dearly."

Former marathon world record holder Eliud Kipchoge said: "I am deeply saddened by the tragic passing of the Marathon World record holder and rising star Kelvin Kiptum. An athlete who had a whole life ahead of him to achieve incredible greatness. I offer my deepest condolences to his young family. May God comfort you during this trying time."

Kenyan president William Ruto stated: "Kelvin Kiptum was a star. Arguably one of the world's finest sportsmen who broke barriers to secure a marathon record." He later ordered a house to be built for Kiptum's family, to be completed within a 40-day mourning period.

On 23 February 2024, Kiptum was buried at his farm in Naiberi, following a funeral ceremony in Chepkorio that was attended by Sebastian Coe and President Ruto. At the 2024 Chicago Marathon, Ruth Chepng'etich dedicated her world record run to Kiptum.

== Achievements ==
=== Personal bests ===
| Surface | Event | Time | Place | Date | Notes |
|---|---|---|---|---|---|
| Track | 10,000 metres | 28:27.87 | Stockholm, Sweden | 4 May 2021 | |
| Road | 10 km | 28:17 | Utrecht, Netherlands | 6 October 2019 | |
| Road | Half marathon | 58:42 | Valencia, Spain | 6 December 2020 | |
| Road | Marathon | 2:00:35 | Chicago, United States | 8 October 2023 | 4th all time |

=== Marathons ===
| Year | Competition | Venue | Position | Event | Time | Notes |
|---|---|---|---|---|---|---|
| 2022 | Valencia Marathon | Valencia, Spain | 1st | Elite Platinum marathon | 2:01:53 | PB CR, 4th performance all time (WR 44 s+) |
| 2023 | London Marathon | London, United Kingdom | 1st | World Marathon Majors | 2:01:25 | PB CR, 2nd performance all time (WR 16 s+) |
| 2023 | Chicago Marathon | Chicago, United States | 1st | World Marathon Majors | 2:00:35 | PB CR WR (previous WR 34 s-) |

=== World Marathon Majors Series timeline ===
| World Marathon Majors | 2023 (Series XV) |
|---|---|
| Tokyo Marathon | – |
| Boston Marathon | – |
| London Marathon | 1st 2:01:25 |
| Berlin Marathon | – |
| Chicago Marathon | 1st 2:00:35 |
| New York City Marathon | – |
| Series standing | Winner; 50 pts |

== See also ==
- Athletics competitors who died during their careers

== Notes ==
Records
| Preceded by (Kenya) Eliud Kipchoge | Men's marathon world record holder 8 October 2023 – present | Succeeded by Incumbent |
