= Jos Hermens =

Dutch long-distance runner

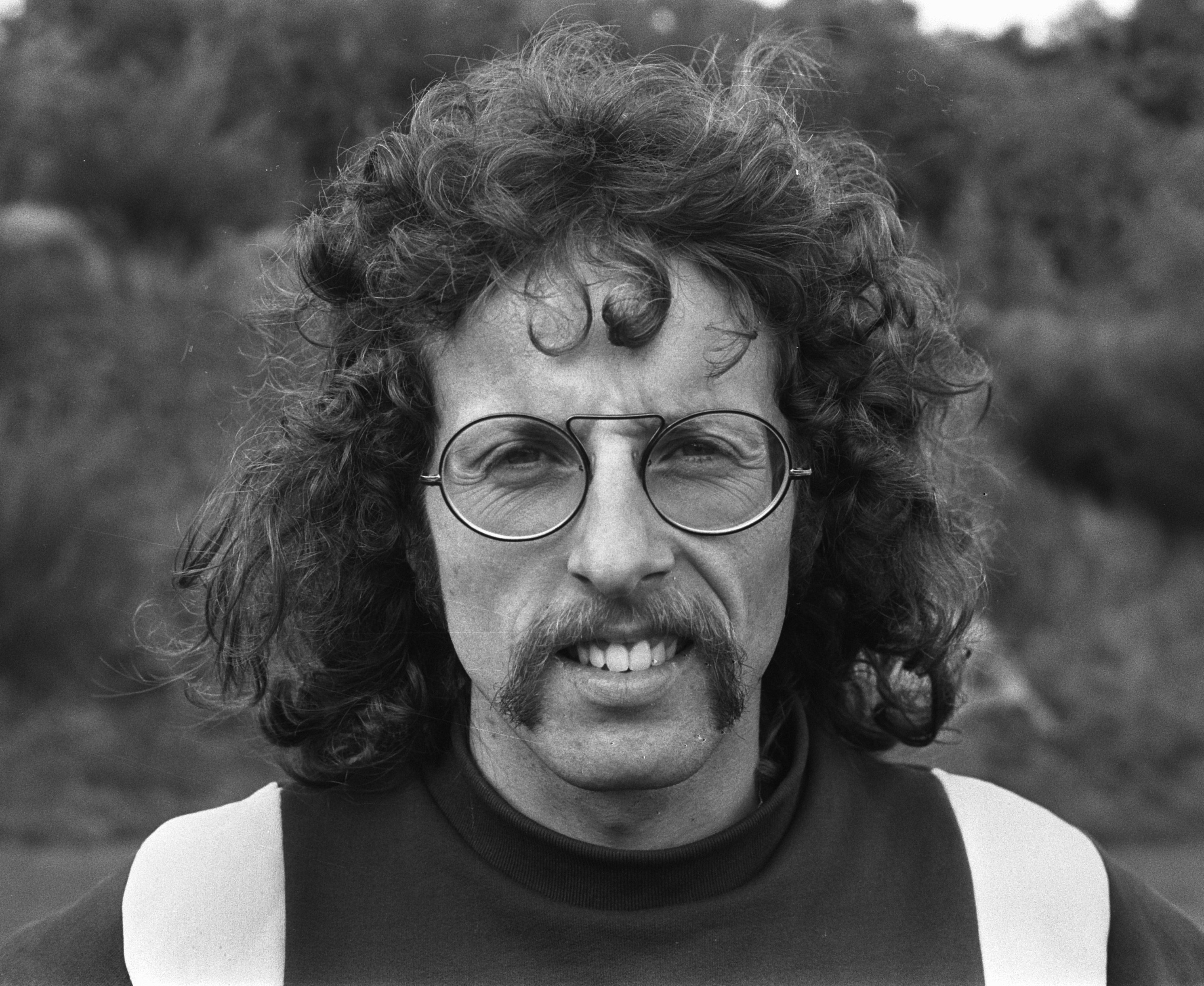
- Hermens in 1975

Personal information
- Nationality: Dutch
- Born: 8 January 1950 (age 76) Nijmegen, Netherlands
- Height: 179 cm (5 ft 10 in)
- Weight: 67 kg (148 lb)

Sport
- Sport: Athletics
- Event: long distance
- Club: KNAU
Medal record
Men's athletics
Representing Europe
IAAF World Cup
Bronze medal – third place	1977 Düsseldorf	10,000 metres

Josephus Maria Melchior Hermens (born 8 January 1950) is a former Dutch long-distance runner. Subsequently, he also became well known for his later career as a sports manager as the founder and CEO of Global Sports Communication, which manages many Olympian athletes.

== Running career ==
Hermens is a three-time national champion in the men's 5,000 metres, and collected his first title on 14 July 1973 in The Hague. He was named Dutch Sportsman of the Year in 1975. He was a 10,000 metres finalist at the 1976 Summer Olympics and set the world record for the hour run the same year.

Hermens twice improved the world hour record, on the Papendal track. In September 1975, with Gerard Tebroke as a pacemaker, he ran 20,907 meters. In May 1976, without a pacemaker, he ran an additional 37 meters. This record held until 1991.

Hermens had withdrawn from the 1972 Olympic Games following the Munich massacre. "It's quite simple," he said. "We were invited to a party, and if someone comes to the party and shoots people, how can you stay?"

Hermens finished third behind Dave Bedford in the 10,000 metres event at the 1972 AAA Championships and second behind Brendan Foster in the 5,000 metres at the 1974 AAA Championships.

== Sports management career ==
After his athletic career was cut short by injuries, Hermens worked for Nike, leaving it in 1985 to start his management company, Global Sports Communications. Hermens' company manages in excess of 100 athletes; his current and former clients include Haile Gebrselassie, Eliud Kipchoge, Kenenisa Bekele, Gabriela Szabo, Nils Schumann, and Hezekiél Sepeng.

Awards
Preceded by Egbert Nijstad	Herman van Leeuwen Cup; 1972; 1974, 1975	Succeeded by Haico Scharn
Preceded by Haico Scharn	Herman van Leeuwen Cup; 1972; 1974, 1975	Succeeded by Ruud Wielart
Preceded by Johan Cruijff	Dutch Sportsman of the Year; 1975	Succeeded by Piet Kleine
