= Yalemzerf Yehualaw =

Ethiopian long-distance runner (born 1999)

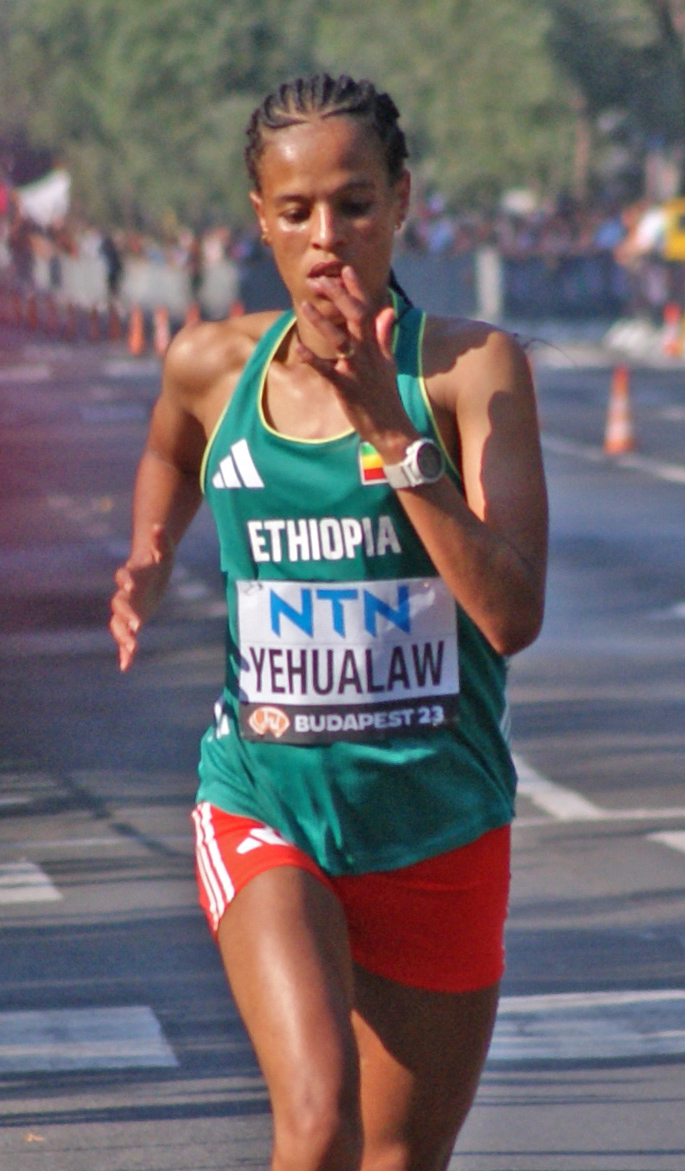
- Yehualaw at the 2023 World Athletics Championships

Personal information
- Full name: Yalemzerf Yehualaw Densa
- Born: 3 August 1999 (age 26) Finote Selam, Mirab Gojjam Zone, Ethiopia
- Spouse: Genetu Molalign

Sport
- Country: Ethiopia
- Sport: Athletics
- Event: Long-distance running
- Team: NN Running Team
- Coached by: Tessema Abshero

Achievements and titles
- Personal bests: 5000 m: 14:53.77 (2021); 10,000 m: 30:20.77 (2021); Road; 5 km: 15:27 (2020); 10 km: 29:14 WR (2022); Half marathon: 1:03:51 (2021); Marathon: 2:16:52 (2024)
Medal record
Women's athletics
Representing Ethiopia
World Half Marathon Championships
Gold medal – first place	2020 Gdynia	Team race
Bronze medal – third place	2020 Gdynia	Half marathon
African Games
Gold medal – first place	2019 Rabat	Half marathon
World Marathon Majors
Gold medal – first place	2022 London	Marathon
Bronze medal – third place	2025 Boston	Marathon

Yalemzerf Yehualaw Densa (born 3 August 1999) is an Ethiopian long-distance runner. She won the 2022 London Marathon. Yehualaw is the current world record holder in the 10 kilometres road race, sits second on the world all-time list at the half marathon and tenth on the respective world all-time list for the marathon.

Yehualaw recorded the then-fastest ever women's marathon debut at the time at the 2022 Hamburg Marathon.

== Early life and background ==
Yalemzerf Yehualaw was born the eldest of six siblings in Finote Selam in the West Gojjam area of the Amhara Region. Her name means in Amharic 'edge of the world'.

She was winning track races at school from the age of 12 and later also youth track titles in her highly-competitive region. With wins on the track, road and cross country, she was invited to join the Ethiopian Youth Sport Academy in Addis Ababa where she currently lives, and then, after four years in 2017, to join the NN Running Team coached by Tessema Abshero.

== Career ==
=== 2019–2021 ===
A 19-year-old Yehualaw made her international debut in April 2019 at the Rabat Half Marathon in Morocco, where she took victory. The same year, she represented Ethiopia at the African Games held also in Rabat and won the women's half marathon event, breaking Games record in a time of 1:10:26. She also won the Great Ethiopian Run, a 10 kilometres road race in Addis Ababa, setting a new course record of 31:55.

She earned the bronze medal in the women's half marathon at the postponed 2020 World Half Marathon Championships held in Gdynia, Poland, just three seconds behind gold medallist Peres Jepchirchir. A month later in November, Yehualaw competed at the Delhi Half Marathon in India where she faced a world-class field. In most impressive performance of her career up to that point, she won the race in a time of 1:04:46, the second-fastest women's time ever recorded for the distance, beating world record-holder Ababel Yeshaneh and 2019 World marathon champion Ruth Chepng'etich.

In August 2021, Yehualaw competed in the Antrim Coast Half Marathon in Northern Ireland setting a new world record time of 63m 44s, the first women's mark under 64 minutes not ratified because the course was 54 metres short. She ran legal 63m 51s in October at the Valencia Half Marathon thus securing second mark on the world all-time list behind team-mate Letesenbet Gidey, who set a world record in this race.

=== 2022: World 10 km record and London Marathon win ===
In January, after having to withdraw from the Valencia 10 km two weeks earlier, Yehualaw bettered her own course record at the Great Ethiopian Run with a time of 31:17, the fastest 10 km ever recorded at altitude.

On 27 February, she ran again 10 kilometres and set a new world record in the women's event in Castellón, Spain, slicing 24 seconds off the still-unratified mark held by Bahrain's Kalkidan Gezahegne since 2021, with a clocking of 29 minutes 14 seconds. At the time Kenya's Joyciline Jepkosgei held the ratified record of 29:43, set in 2017. Only two women ever had run faster over the distance on the track. She covered the first 5 km in 14:28 – just nine seconds slower than the world record for this distance.

In April, in her anticipated first marathon, Yehualaw achieved the fastest ever women's marathon debut of 2:17:23 at the Hamburg Marathon, breaking the Ethiopian record, German all-comers' record, and putting her sixth on the world all-time list. She won by almost nine minutes (around three kilometres) in windy conditions.

The 23-year-old successfully defended her Antrim Coast Half Marathon title in August, setting the UK all-comers' record with her joint fifth-fastest ever time of 64m 22s.

On 2 October, Yehualaw took her first victory at a World Marathon Major at the London Marathon, becoming the youngest ever female winner of the London event. She clocked 2:17:26, only three seconds outside her personal best, after she fell over with about 10 km to go. She then soon broke clear of Joyciline Jepkosgei in second, with 24th mile in a quick 4:43 according to initial reports (Note: Official data and initial reports pointed out to a very fast 4:43 24th mile split. However, after further evaluation it was determined that the 24th-mile marker was situated at the wrong spot.) — the fastest split in women's marathon history. Her finishing time was the third-fastest women's mark in the London event history, behind only the world records set by Paula Radcliffe (2:15:25) and Mary Keitany (2:17:01, women-only).

=== 2023–present ===
Chasing her own world 10 km record in windy conditions at the 10K Valencia Ibercaja in January, Yehualaw missed it by 5 seconds to set a course record of 29:19, the second-fastest ever female performance in the event. She finished fifth in her second appearance at the London Marathon in April in 2:18:53.

Yehualaw finished third in the 2025 Boston Marathon, in a time of 2:18:06.

== Personal bests ==
Type	Event	Time	Place	Date	Notes
Track	5000 metres	14:53.77	Nice, France	12 June 2021	
Track	10,000 metres	30:20.77	Hengelo, Netherlands	8 June 2021	
Road	5 km	15:27	Addis Ababa, Ethiopia	15 March 2020	
Road	10 km	29:14	Castellón, Spain	27 February 2022	Mx, World record until 14 January 2024
Road	Half marathon	63:51	Valencia, Spain	24 October 2021	Mx, 2nd of all time
Road	Marathon	2:16:52	Amsterdam, Netherlands	20 October 2024	Mx

== Achievements ==
Year	Competition	Venue	Position	Event	Time	Notes
Representing Ethiopia
2019	African Games	Rabat, Morocco	1st	Half marathon	1:10:26	GR
2020	World Half Marathon Championships	Gdynia, Poland	3rd	Half marathon	1:05:19	PB
2020	World Half Marathon Championships	Gdynia, Poland	1st	Team race	3:16:39	
2023	World Championships	Budapest, Hungary	5th	Marathon	2:26:13	
World Marathon Majors
2022	London Marathon	London, United Kingdom	1st	Marathon	2:17:26	
2023	London Marathon	London, United Kingdom	5th	Marathon	2:18:53	
Road races
2019	Rabat Marathon	Rabat, Morocco	1st	Half marathon	1:09:13	
2019	Delhi Half Marathon	New Delhi, India	2nd	Half marathon	1:06:01	
2019	Great Ethiopian Run	Addis Ababa, Ethiopia	1st	10 km	31:55	CR
2019	Xiamen International Marathon	Xiamen, China	1st	Half marathon	1:07:34	
2020	Ras Al Khaimah Half Marathon	Ras Al Khaimah, UAE	6th	Half marathon	1:06:35	
2020	Women's First 5 km	Addis Ababa, Ethiopia	2nd	5 km	15:27	
2020	Delhi Half Marathon	New Delhi, India	1st	Half marathon	1:04:46	CR
2020	San Silvestre Vallecana	Madrid, Spain	1st	10 km	31:17	
2021	Istanbul Half Marathon	Istanbul, Turkey	2nd	Half marathon	1:04:40	
2021	Antrim Coast Half Marathon	Larne, Northern Ireland	1st	Half marathon	~~1:03:44~~	
2021	Valencia Half Marathon	Valencia, Spain	2nd	Half marathon	1:03:51	
2022	Great Ethiopian Run	Addis Ababa, Ethiopia	1st	10 km	31:17	CR
2022	10K Castelló	Castellón, Spain	1st	10 km	29:14	WR
2022	Hamburg Marathon	Hamburg, Germany	1st	Marathon	2:17:23	CR NR
2022	Antrim Coast Half Marathon	Larne, Northern Ireland	1st	Half marathon	1:04:22	CR
2023	10K Valencia	Valencia, Spain	1st	10 km	29:19	CR
2024	Amsterdam Marathon	Amsterdam, Netherlands	1st	Marathon	2:16:52	CR PB
