= Kaptagat =

Human settlement in Uasin Gishu County, Kenya

- Location in Kenya
- Coordinates: 0°26′13″N 35°27′21″E
- Country: Kenya
- County: Uasin Gishu County
- Elevation: 8,200 ft (2,500 m)
- Time zone: UTC+3 (EAT)
  - Summer (DST): None

Kaptagat is a settlement in Uasin Gishu County, in the southwestern part of Kenya. This part of the country, where the two counties of Uasin Gishu and Elgeyo-Marakwet share a border, is used by the majority of Kenyan professional long-distance runners to train for professional competition. Eliud Kipchoge, the former marathon world record holder, and the Tokyo Olympics and Rio Olympics marathon gold medalist, maintains a training camp in Kaptagat.

== Location ==
Kaptagat is located in Kaptagat Ward, Ainabkoi sub-county, at the eastern edge of Uasin Gishu County, approximately 24 kilometres (15 mi) by road, east of the city of Eldoret, along the B54 Road, and approximately 14 kilometres (9 mi) by road, northwest of the small town of Chepkorio, in neighboring Elgeyo Marakwet County, along the same B54 Road.

== Athletics ==
Kaptagat is home to the Great Rift Valley Sports Camp, a training camp for many Kenyan runners including Elijah Lagat, Eliud Kipchoge, Moses Tanui and Brimin Kipruto. Kaptagat is also home to Chepkorio Athletics Club, a club that caters for student athletes. Global Sports Communication's athletics training camp is also located in Kaptagat.

Geoffrey Kipsang Kamworor, a Kenyan professional long-distance runner who competes in cross country, marathon, and half marathon competitions, was born in 1992, in Chepkorio Village, not far from Kaptagat. He undergoes some of his training at Chepkoilel Grounds in Eldoret.

Marathon world record holder Kelvin Kiptum was killed in a car crash near Kaptagat on 11 February 2024.
